= Adriana Calderón =

Mexican climate activist

Adriana Calderón Hernández
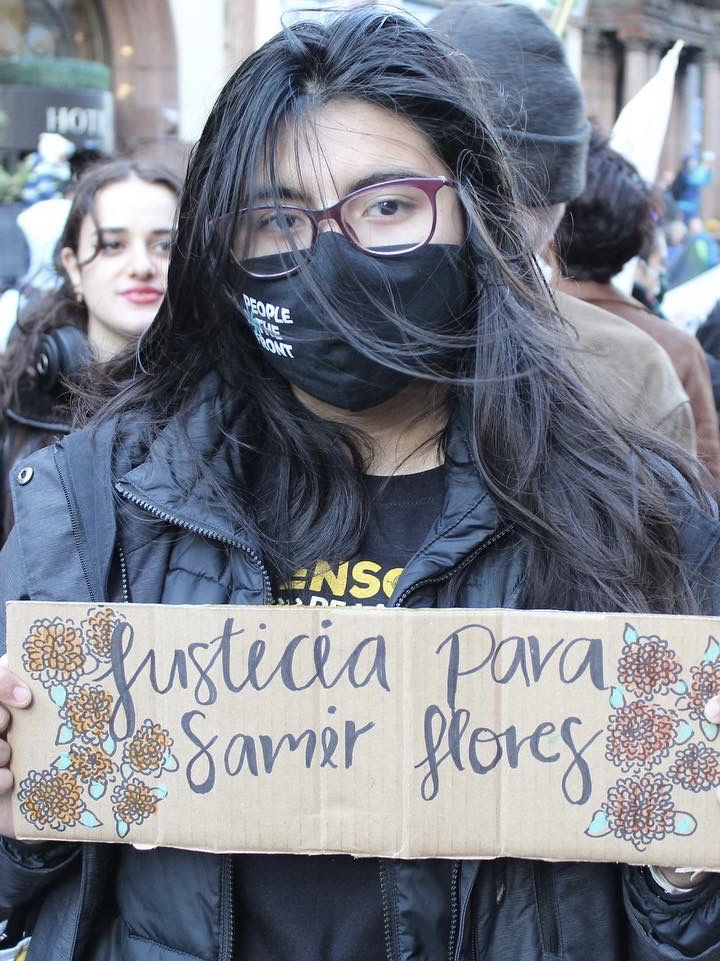
- Calderón striking at COP26.
- Born: 2003 (age 22–23); Morelos, Mexico
- Education: University of Ottawa
- Occupation: Activist
- Known for: Fridays For Future

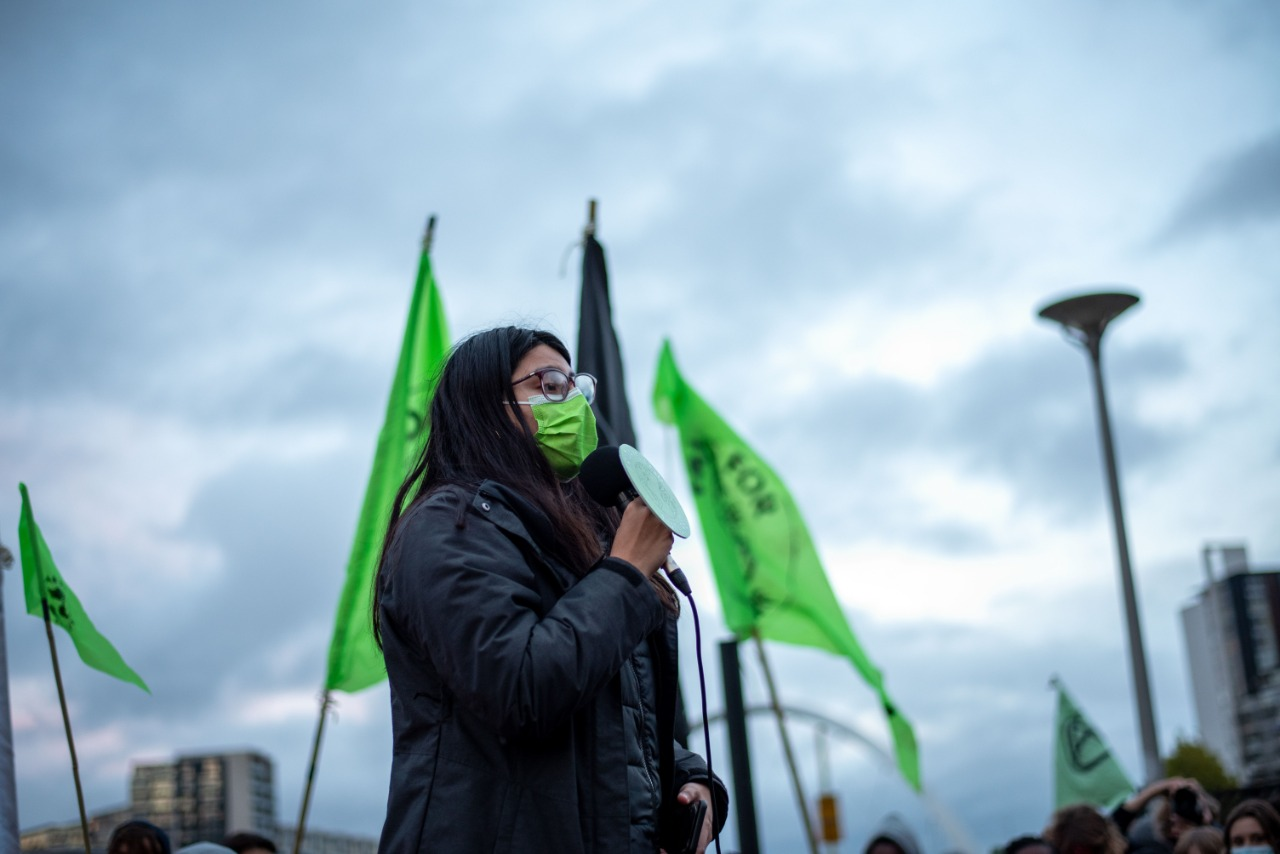
Adriana Calderón participating in a Fridays for Future press conference at COP26

Adriana Calderón Hernandéz (born 2003) is a youth climate activist and organizer from Mexico. She currently advocates for climate justice with Fridays For Future, Fridays For Future MAPA (Most Affected People and Areas) and Fridays For Future in Mexico (Viernes Por El Futuro Mexico). She is one of the co-signers of UNICEF's Children's climate risk index report, part of the delegation of Fridays For Future MAPA that attended COP26, and one of the activists targeting the British multinational bank Standard Chartered and the Mexican state-owned petroleum company Petróleos Mexicanos (PEMEX).

== Biography ==
Calderón was born in 2003 in Morelos, Mexico. She remembers her house flooding when she was a child, and as a teenager, she noticed the floods becoming more frequent. She first got involved in the climate movement when she heard about the death of Samir Flores, a prominent indigenous land rights activist and journalist who was shot in his home. After this, she became involved with the campaign for the Escazú Agreement and started connecting with climate activists around the world.

She has worked with Fridays For Future to organize mobilizations, such as for Earth Day and the campaign "PEMEX does not love you", which aimed to stop government subsidization of the petroleum company PEMEX. The COVID-19 pandemic allowed her to connect better within Fridays For Future. She participated in the creation of MAPA, creating a network of young people from Bangladesh, Thailand and the Philippines, who all ended up fighting for the same cause. She was also involved in the digital strike and march against Standard Chartered Bank, which served to strengthen social media with more content through hashtags such as #UprootTheSystem. Calderón has used the spaces of Fridays For Future to denounce that the climate crisis is a consequence of the colonial patterns that oppress people from the global South, especially from Mexico:

Colonialist extractivism affects Mexico a lot, with Coca-Cola and Bonafont using up the water and Canadian mining companies stealing land from communities ... the fight we are waging at the COP is not going to be for our future, but for the people who today are suffering the consequences of these socio-environmental injustices.

On August 19, 2021, she published an article in The New York Times titled This Is the World Being Left to Us by Adults alongside Greta Thunberg from Sweden, Farzana Faruk Jhumu from Bangladesh, and Eric Njuguna from Kenya.

The world's climate scientists have made it clear that the time is now — we must act urgently to avoid the worst possible consequences. The world's young people stand with the scientists and will continue to sound the alarm. We are in a crisis of crises. A pollution crisis. A climate crisis. A children's rights crisis. We will not allow the world to look away.

Calderón is studying international studies and modern languages at the University of Ottawa.

== Published works ==
- Thunberg, Greta; Calderón, Adriana; Faruk, Farzana; Njuguna, Eric (2021). "Opinion | This Is the World Being Left to Us by Adults". The New York Times. ISSN 0362-4331.
- Thunberg, Greta; Calderón, Adriana; Faruk, Farzana; Njuguna, Eric (2021). Foreword of "The Climate Crisis Is a Child Rights Crisis: Introducing the Children's Climate Risk Index." UNICEF. ISBN 978-92-806-5276-5.

== See also ==
- Fridays For Future
- MAPA
