= Patience Nabukalu =

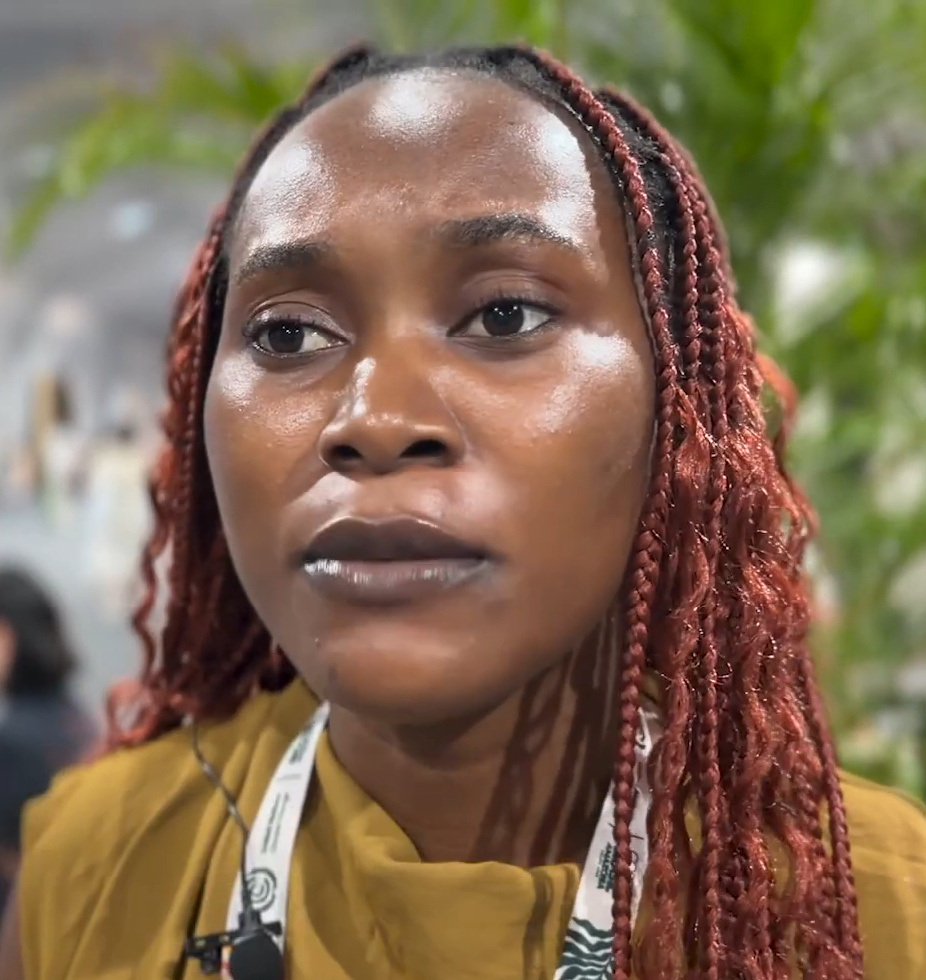
- Nabukalu in 2026
- Born: June 15, 1997 (age 29); Kampala, Uganda
- Citizenship: Ugandan
- Occupation: Climate activist
- Organizations: Fridays for Future Uganda; Stop Wetland Degradation; Youth Empowerment Initiative Uganda
- Known for: Co-founding Fridays for Future Uganda; Campaigning against the East African Crude Oil Pipeline; MAPA Uganda representative at COP26 and COP27

Patience Nabukalu is a Ugandan climate activist.

== Biography ==
Nabukalu was born 15 June 1997 and raised in Naneete, a suburb of Kampala, Uganda. When she was 9, her childhood friend was killed by severe flooding. She studied geography at A-level but was unable to afford university.

In 2019, she helped create the Ugandan chapter of the youth-led climate action group Fridays for Future, where she is currently a coordinator. Starting in 2020, she led a campaign against the East African Crude Oil Pipeline, which included interrupting the annual general meeting of HSBC to criticize their funding of fossil fuel projects.

She started activism on social media in 2020. Nabukalu is also the founder of Stop Wetland Degradation and the Youth Empowerment Initiative Uganda, and was a Most Affected People and Areas Uganda representative at COP 26 and 27.
