= Farzana Faruk =

Bangladeshi Climate Activist

Farzana Faruk Jhumu
- Born: 1998 (age 27–28); Bangladesh
- Citizenship: Bangladesh
- Occupation: Climate Advocate
- Movement: Fridays for Future

Farzana Faruk Jhumu (born 1998) is a climate justice activist from Fridays for Future, Bangladesh. She is currently living in Dhaka, Bangladesh.

== Early life and education ==
Farzana lived her early years in the Lakshmipur District. She is a Computer science and engineering graduate. Her thesis project on her undergraduate degree was about a mental health issue, suicidal ideation detection.

She is a co-founder of KaathPencil, an organization for teaching the unprivileged children of her area. The organization currently work on Climate justice, Children's rights, and Women's empowerment. Poribesher Proti Projonmo (Generation for Environment) is one of their ongoing campaign with several organizations to educate children and young people about climate change and how to fight them.

== Works ==
Farzana's journey against the climate crisis started in 2017 with cleaning plastic from the neighbourhood. She joined Fridays for Future, Bangladesh, in 2019. As Bangladesh is a severely affected country and Dhaka is one of the densely polluted cities, she started to engage with climate activism. Since early 2020, she has been organizing, handling social media, and communicating for Fridays for Future Bangladesh. In 2021 she was also being in part of Fridays for Future MAPA.

She joined COP26 as an observer on the sailing ship of Greenpeace called Rainbow Warrior with other activists from MAPA. She is also a champion for the Fossil Fuel Non-Proliferation Treaty Initiative to advocate the just transition from fossil fuel. She is working on the demand for reparation. She joined COP27,COP28, COP29 and COP30 with the demand an equitable fossil fuel phase-out. She was in the Party delegation in the COP30

Farzana worked with 350.org to promote Green New Deal in Bangladesh. She served as the youth advocate for UNICEF Bangladesh from 2022-2024. In 2025, she joined to the United Nations Secretary-General’s Youth Advisory Group as the first Bangladeshi youth to serve as a youth advisor to UN Secretary General, pushing for a Just transition and a global fossil fuel phase-out. She is also a regional facilitator of Youth Climate Justice Fund.

- Thunberg, Greta; Calderón, Adriana; Jhumu, Farzana Faruk; Njuguna, Eric (2021-08-19). "Opinion | This Is the World Being Left to Us by Adults". The New York Times. ISSN 0362-4331. Retrieved 2022-05-16.
