= Eric Njuguna =

Kenyan youth climate activist

Eric Damien Njūgūna
- Born: 2002 (age 23–24); Kenya
- Other name: Erica
- Occupation: Climate Justice Activist
- Known for: school strike for climate

Eric Damien Njūgūna (born circa 2002) is a climate activist from Kenya. Njūgūna started their climate activism in 2017 after severe droughts in Nairobi impacted their school's water supply. by organizing with the group Zero Hour and then Fridays for Future Kenya.

In August 2021, Njūgūna co-authored an essay with Greta Thunberg, Adriana Calderón, and Farzana Faruk Jhumu that was published in The New York Times. Their co-authored essay highlighted a 2021 UNICEF report that stated 2.2 billion children are at "extremely high-risk" of experiencing the consequences of climate change. Later in 2021, Njūgūna attended the 2021 United Nations Climate Change Conference (COP26) and represented Fridays for Future Kenya. At COP26, Njūgūna, alongside Vanessa Nakate and Elizabeth Wathuti, met with United Nations Secretary-General Antonio Guterres to discuss climate change.

At the 2022 United Nations Climate change conference, Njuguna called for climate finance to address drought in Kenya and for financing to increase coverage of early warning systems in Africa

As the 2023 Bonn climate conference came to an end, Njuguna joined global climate justice movements to call for a global mobilization to fight fossil fuels in September 2023 saying '' Witnessing the detrimental consequences of our addiction to fossil fuels, we are rising from classrooms to the streets, with an unwavering determination to fight for change.'' Njuguna joined Greta Thunberg at a press conference hosted by E3G and 350.org on the urgency of putting fossil fuel phaseout on the agenda at the COP28 summit later that year in Dubai. Later in September, Njuguna told Reuters that they are taking to the streets to demand that African leaders phaseout fossil fuels and instead focus on investing in community led renewable energy to meet the energy demand of the 600 million Africans without access to electricity.

Later that year, as Action Aid international launched the Fund our Future Campaign at the African people's Climate Assembly, Njuguna urged an end to bank financing of fossil fuels and industrial agriculture.

At the 2023 United Nations Climate change conference in Dubai, Njuguna called out the influence of the fossil fuel industry at the talks and called for a Conflict of interest policy. Njuguna revealed that the fossil fuel industry is aware that their time to operate freely without accountability highly depends on the discussions at the CoP28 and that is why they have sent a high number of delegates to attempt and renegotiate on their terms of existence. Earlier, Njuguna had denounced the choice of an oil giant CEO to preside over the talks calling it a “a stab in the back for poor countries to have a fossil fuel CEO on top of efforts to constrain the climate crisis'' At COP28, Njuguna, together with climate activist Mitzi jonelle tan and English singer Ellie Goulding, were some of the activists convened on the International Federation of Red Cross and Red Crescent Societies' ''Reclaimed table'', a table made out of debris from climate disasters, that won the 2024 PR week's global event activation award

At the 2024 United Nations Climate Change Conference, Njuguna yet again called out the presence of the fossil fuel industry at the talks saying '' We cannot have the same industry that we are trying to kill in the negotiations'' At a protest urging global north countries to pay what they owe to global south countries, Njuguna said the issue is not a lack of finance but misplaced priorities pointing to how much money from global north countries flows to the fossil fuel industry as subsidies and for wars. In a separate protest Njuguna had urged Global north governments to pay up in the scale of trillions not billions as global south countries need this finance for Climate change adaptation and Mitigation

They are on the steering committee of the Fossil Fuel Non-Proliferation Treaty Initiative and is a founding member of the African climate reparations collective

Njuguna is a youth champion of the solar geoengineering non use agreement and together with activist Disha Ravi called for a full ban on solar geoengineering on an article for Project Syndicate

== See also ==
A day in the life at COP for youth activist Erica Njuguna | BBC What's new / Actu Jeunes
