= Greta Thunberg =

Swedish activist (born 2003)

- Thunberg in 2026
- Born: Greta Tintin Eleonora Ernman Thunberg; 3 January 2003 (age 23); Stockholm, Uppland, Sweden
- Years active: 2018–present
- Known for: Climate and pro-Palestinian activism
- Movement: Climate movement; Fridays for Future; Protests against the Russo-Ukrainian war (2022–present); 2024–2026 Georgian protests; Gaza war protests; June 2025 Gaza Freedom Flotilla; Global Sumud Flotilla; 2026 Cuban crisis; Nuestra América Convoy
- Parents: Svante Thunberg (father); Malena Ernman (mother)
- Relatives: Beata MonaLisa (sister); Olof Thunberg (grandfather)

Greta Tintin Eleonora Ernman Thunberg (Note: Swedish: [ˈɡrêːta ˈtʉ̂ːnbærj]) (born 3 January 2003) is a Swedish activist known for pressuring governments to address climate change and social issues. She gained global attention in 2018, at age 15, after starting a solo school strike outside the Swedish parliament, which inspired the worldwide Fridays for Future movement.

Following the growth of the school strike movement, Thunberg became an internationally known figure through speeches, protests, and participation in climate demonstrations in Europe and elsewhere. She has addressed political leaders and taken part in major climate-related events, and her activism has been widely covered by international media, drawing both support and criticism. She has also broadened her focus to include human rights and global justice, voicing support for Ukraine, Palestine, Armenia, Cuba and Western Sahara. In 2025, Thunberg twice joined a humanitarian flotilla bound for the Gaza Strip, which drew international attention and political controversy.

Thunberg has been credited with sparking the "Greta effect", influencing environmental awareness and youth engagement worldwide. Supporters credit her with increasing public attention to climate issues and youth activism, while critics have questioned her rhetoric, methods, and role in political debate. Thunberg has consistently stated that her actions are guided by published climate research and policy targets. She has received numerous honours, including inclusion in Time's 100 Most Influential People and being named Person of the Year in 2019.

== Early life ==
Greta Tintin Eleonora Ernman Thunberg was born on 3 January 2003, in Stockholm, Uppland, Sweden, to opera singer Malena Ernman and actor Svante Thunberg. Her paternal grandfather was actor and director Olof Thunberg. As explained by The Week, "with a thespian father" and singer mother, "it is perhaps unsurprising that [Thunberg] has a slightly unusual name.... Thunberg shares her second name with the adventuring creation of Belgian cartoonist Georges Remi, better known as Hergé." She has a younger sister, Beata.

Thunberg says she first heard about climate change in 2011, when she was eight years old, and could not understand why so little was being done about it. The situation depressed her, and as a result, at the age of 11, she largely stopped talking, severely restricted her eating, and lost ten kilograms (22 lb) in two months. Eventually, she was diagnosed with Asperger syndrome, obsessive–compulsive disorder (OCD), and selective mutism. In one of her first speeches demanding climate action, Thunberg described her selective mutism as meaning she "only speaks when necessary". She struggled with depression for almost four years before she began her school strike campaign and mentions being bipolar in her Instagram bio. When she started protesting, her parents did not support her activism. Her father said he did not like her missing school but added: "[We] respect that she wants to make a stand. She can either sit at home and be really unhappy, or protest and be happy."

From her TEDx Talk

I was diagnosed with Asperger's syndrome, OCD and selective mutism. That basically means I only speak when I think it's necessary. Now is one of those moments.

— Greta Thunberg, Stockholm
November 2018

Thunberg's diagnosis of Asperger's syndrome was made public nationwide in Sweden by her mother in May 2015, to help families in similar situations. While acknowledging that Asperger's "has limited [her] before", Thunberg views her diagnosis positively and has described it as a "superpower". She was later described as not only the best-known climate change activist, but also the best-known autism rights activist. In 2021, Thunberg said that many people in the Fridays for Future movement are autistic, and very inclusive and welcoming. She thinks that the reason so many autistic people become climate activists is that they cannot look away, and have to tell the truth as they see it: "I know lots of people who have been depressed, and then they have joined the climate movement or Fridays for Future and have found a purpose in life and found friendship and a community that they are welcome in." She considers the best things that have resulted from her activism to be friendships and happiness.

For about two years, Thunberg challenged her parents to lower the family's carbon footprint and overall impact on the environment by becoming vegan, upcycling, and giving up flying. She has said she showed them graphs and data, but when that did not work, she warned her family that they were stealing her future. Giving up flying in part meant her mother had to abandon international ventures in her opera career. Interviewed in December 2019 by the BBC, her father said: "To be honest, [her mother] didn't do it to save the climate. She did it to save her child, because she saw how much it meant to her, and then, when she did that, she saw how much [Greta] grew from that, how much energy she got from it." Thunberg credits her parents' eventual response and lifestyle changes with giving her hope and belief that she could make a difference. Asked in September 2021 whether she felt guilty about ending her mother's international career, she was surprised by the question: "It was her choice. I didn't make her do anything. I just provided her with the information to base her decision on." The family's story is recounted in the 2018 book Scenes from the Heart, updated in 2020 as Our House Is on Fire: Scenes of a Family and a Planet in Crisis, with contributions from the girls, and the whole family credited as authors.

== Activism ==
Thunberg began her climate and environmental activism in 2018, as a 15 year old teenager. In 2023, following the October 7 attacks, she began to get involved with pro-Palestinian activism. In 2024 she began activism into other social justice areas.

=== Climate change and environmental activism ===
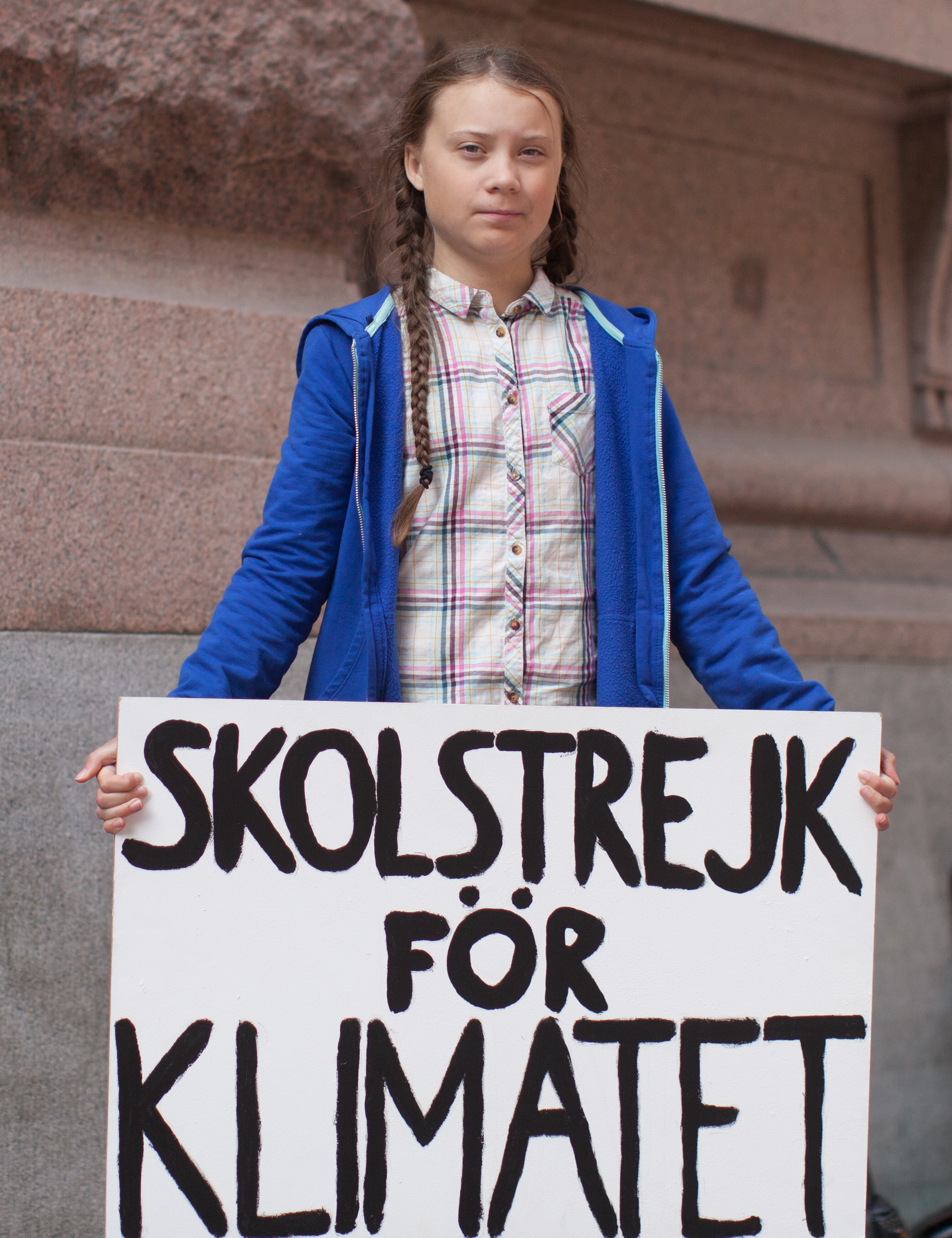
Thunberg in front of the Swedish parliament, holding a "Skolstrejk för klimatet" (School Strike for the Climate) sign, Stockholm, August 2018

==== Strike at the Riksdag ====
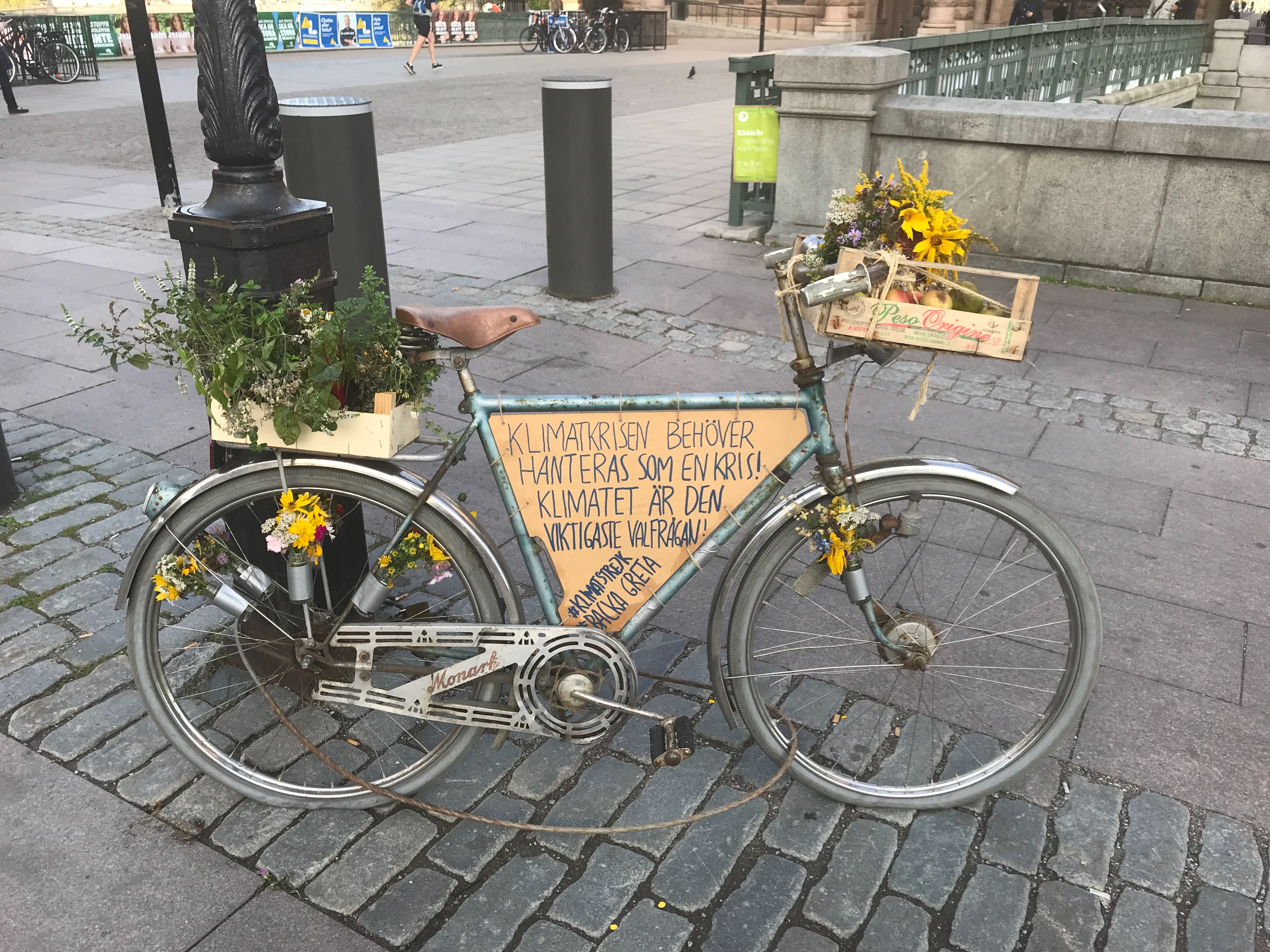
Bicycle in Stockholm with a reference to Thunberg: "The climate crisis must be treated as a crisis! The climate is the most important election issue!" (11 September 2018)

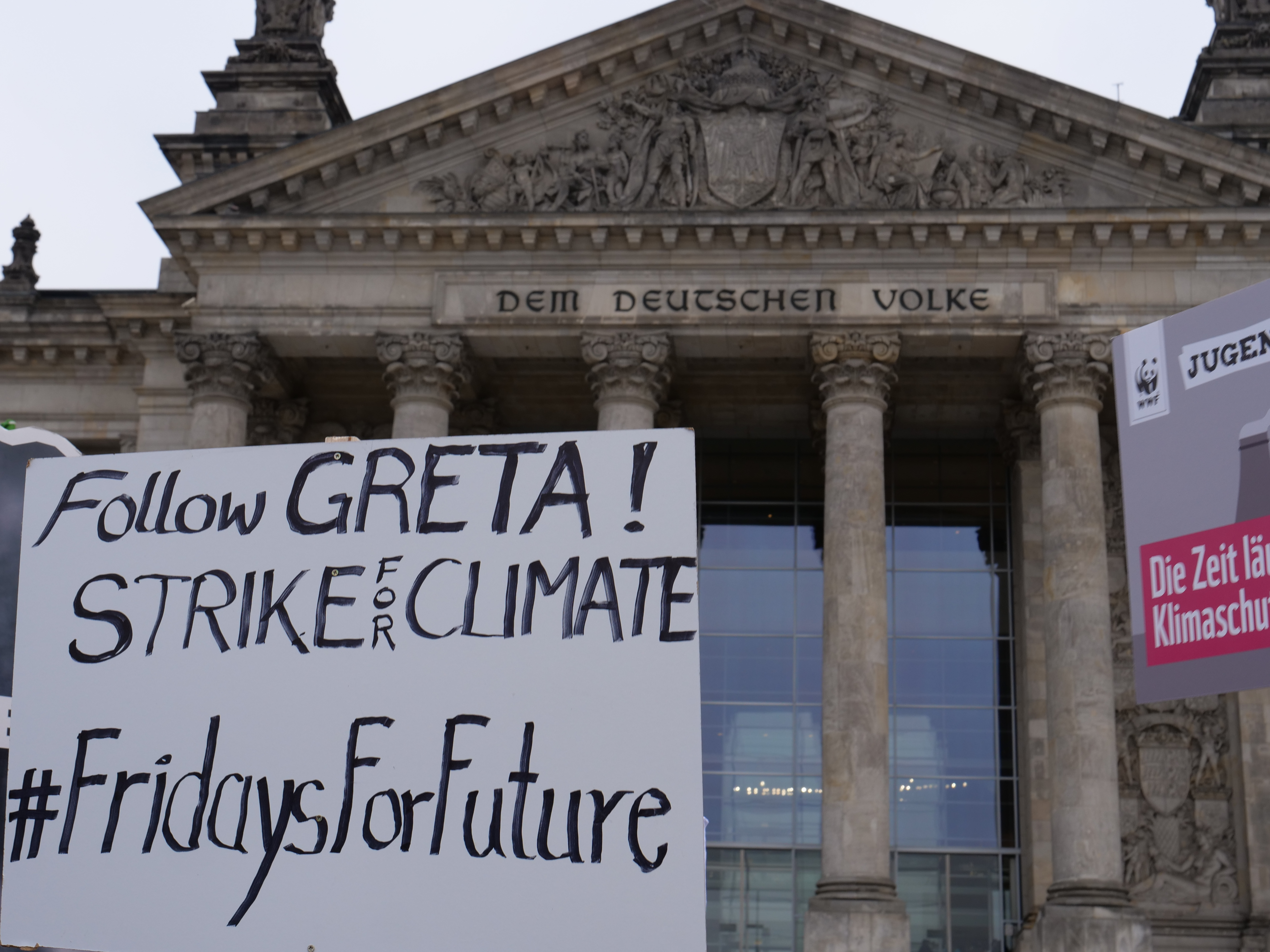
Sign in Berlin, 14 December 2018

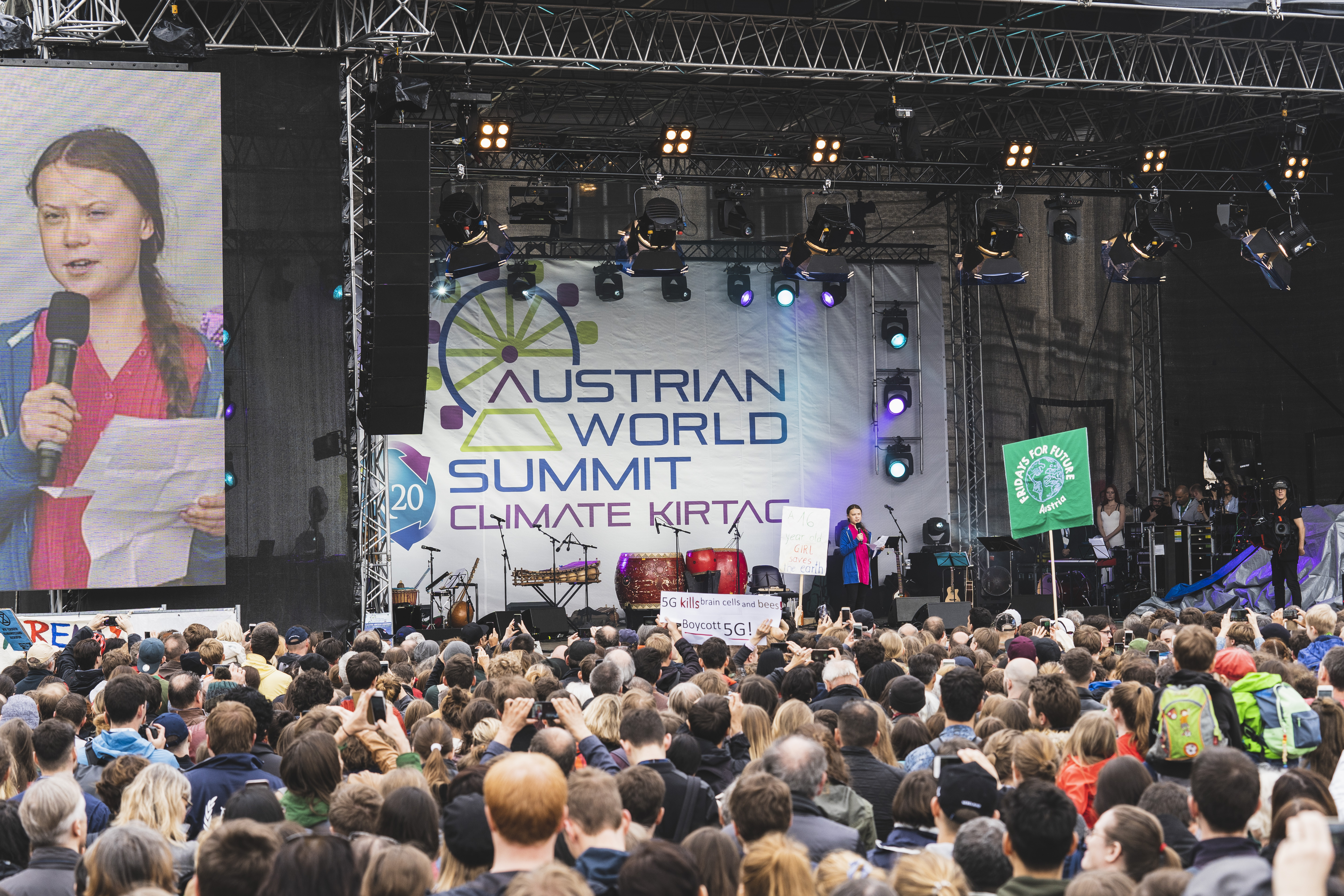
Thunberg speaking at the annual climate conference, Austrian World Summit, 2019

In August 2018, Thunberg began the school climate strikes and public speeches for which she has become an internationally recognized climate activist. In an interview with Amy Goodman of Democracy Now!, she said she got the idea of a climate strike after school shootings in the United States in February 2018 led several youths to refuse to return to school. These teen activists at Marjory Stoneman Douglas High School in Parkland, Florida, went on to organize the March for Our Lives in support of greater gun control. In May 2018, Thunberg won a climate change essay competition held by Swedish newspaper Svenska Dagbladet. In part, she wrote: "I want to feel safe. How can I feel safe when I know we are in the greatest crisis in human history?"

After the paper published her article, Thunberg was contacted by Bo Thorén from Fossil Free Dalsland, a group interested in doing something about climate change. Thunberg attended a few of their meetings. At one of them, Thorén suggested that school children could strike for climate change. Thunberg tried to persuade other young people to get involved but "no one was really interested", so eventually she decided to go ahead with the strike by herself.

On 20 August 2018, Thunberg, who had just started ninth grade, decided not to attend school until the 2018 Swedish general election on 9 September; her protest began after the heat waves and wildfires during Sweden's hottest summer in at least 262 years. Her demands were that the Swedish government reduce carbon emissions in accordance with the Paris Agreement, and she protested by sitting outside the Riksdag every day for three weeks during school hours with the sign reading Skolstrejk för klimatet ("School strike for climate").

Thunberg said her teachers were divided about her missing class to make her point. She says: "As people, they think what I am doing is good, but as teachers, they say I should stop."

==== Social media activism ====
After Thunberg posted a photo of her first strike day on Instagram and Twitter, other social media accounts quickly took up her cause. High-profile youth activists amplified her Instagram post, and on the second day, other activists joined her. A representative of the Finnish bank Nordea quoted one of Thunberg's tweets to more than 200,000 followers. Thunberg's social media profile attracted local reporters, whose stories earned international coverage in little more than a week.

One Swedish climate-focused social media company was We Don't Have Time (WDHT), founded by Ingmar Rentzhog. He said her strike began attracting public attention only after he turned up with a freelance photographer and posted Thunberg's photograph on his Facebook page and Instagram account, and a video in English that he posted on the company's YouTube channel. Rentzhog subsequently asked Thunberg to become an unpaid youth advisor to WDHT. He then used her name and image without her knowledge or permission to raise millions for a WDHT for-profit subsidiary, We Don't Have Time AB, of which he is the chief executive officer. Thunberg stated that she received no money from the company and terminated her volunteer advisor role with WDHT once she realized they were making money from her name.

Throughout 2018, Thunberg's activism evolved from a solitary protest to taking part in demonstrations throughout Europe, making several high-profile public speeches, and mobilizing her followers on social media platforms. In December, after Sweden's 2018 general election, Thunberg continued to school strike – but only on Fridays. She inspired school students across the globe to take part in her Friday school strikes. In December alone, more than 20,000 students held strikes in at least 270 cities.

Thunberg has expressed support for the 2019 Hong Kong protests, calling for the release of 12 Hong Kong activists who were arrested in 2020 while trying to flee Hong Kong by boat, and sending a letter in 2021 about detained Joshua Wong.

Thunberg spoke out against the National Eligibility cum Entrance Test (Undergraduate) 2020 and Joint Entrance Examination 2020 entrance exams, which were conducted in India in September. She said it was unfair for students to have to appear for exams during a global pandemic. She also said that India's students had been deeply impacted by the floods that hit states such as Bihar and Assam, which caused mass destruction.

On 3 February 2021, Thunberg tweeted her support of the ongoing 2020–2021 Indian farmers' protest. Effigies of Thunberg were burned in Delhi by Hindutva nationalists who opposed the farmers' protests. Thunberg's tweet was criticized by the Bharatiya Janata Party–led Indian government, which said that it was an internal matter. In her initial tweet, Thunberg linked to a document that provided a campaigning toolkit for those who wanted to support the farmers' protest. It contained advice on hashtags and how to sign petitions, and it also included suggested actions beyond those directly linked to the farmers' protest. She soon deleted the tweet, saying the document was "outdated", and linked to a different one "to enable anyone unfamiliar with the ongoing farmers protests in India to better understand the situation and make decisions on how to support the farmers based on their own analysis". The Indian climate activist who edited the toolkit, Disha Ravi, was arrested under the charges of sedition and criminal conspiracy on 16 February 2021.

==== Protests and speeches in Europe ====
Thunberg's speech during the plenary session of the 2018 United Nations Climate Change Conference (COP24) went viral. She said that the world leaders present were "not mature enough to tell it like it is". In the first half of 2019, she joined various student protests around Europe, and was invited to speak at various forums and parliaments. At the January 2019 World Economic Forum, Thunberg gave a speech in which she declared: "Our house is on fire." She addressed the British, European and French parliaments; in the latter case several right-wing politicians boycotted her. In a short meeting with Thunberg, Pope Francis thanked her and encouraged her to continue her activism.

By March 2019, Thunberg was still staging her regular protests outside the Swedish parliament every Friday, where other students occasionally joined her. According to her father, her activism did not interfere with her schoolwork, but she had less spare time. She finished lower secondary school with excellent grades: 14 As and three Bs. In July 2019, Time magazine reported Thunberg was taking a "sabbatical year" from school, intending to travel in the Americas while meeting people from the climate movement on her way to attend and address 2019 United Nations Climate Change Conference (COP25).

On 13 July 2026, Greta Thunberg participated in a protest outside the Berlin office of Rheinmetall, a German arms manufacturer, near the Brandenburg Gate. The demonstration, organized as a blockade, was directed against the company's weapons production, which protesters associated with military operations in Palestine and Lebanon. During the gathering, Thunberg stated: "We are doing this because it is our duty to protest against injustice and to stand up against genocide." She further called for the cessation of a new Rheinmetall factory and an end to weapons shipments to Israel, reiterating the phrase "Stop the genocide." Berlin police intervened in the course of the protest and took Thunberg into custody.

==== Transatlantic voyage ====
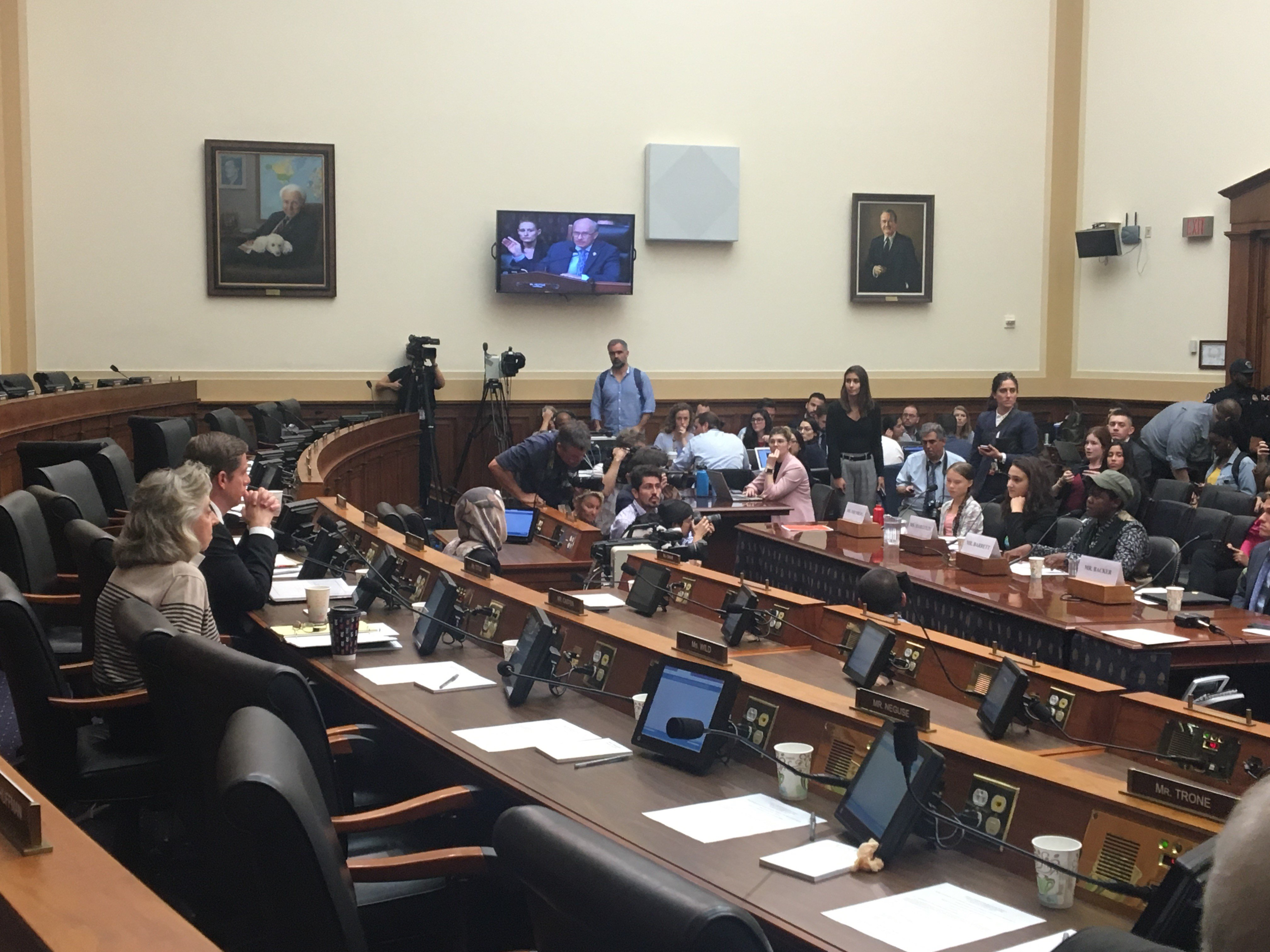
United States Congresswoman Dina Titus listening to Thunberg and her fellow activists discussing the urgent need to address climate change, 2019

In August 2019, Thunberg sailed across the Atlantic Ocean from Plymouth, England, to New York City, in the 60-foot (18 m) racing yacht Malizia II, equipped with solar panels and underwater turbines. The trip was announced as a carbon-neutral transatlantic crossing serving as a demonstration of Thunberg's declared beliefs of the importance of reducing emissions. The voyage took 15 days, from 14 to 28 August 2019. France 24 reported that several crew members would fly to New York to sail the Malizia II yacht back to Europe. On Thunberg's return voyage aboard the La Vagabonde catamaran, she was quoted that she chose sailing as a way to send a message to the world that there is no real sustainable option to travel across the oceans. While in the United States, Thunberg was invited to give testimony in the US House Select Committee on the Climate Crisis on 18 September. Instead of testifying, she gave an eight-sentence statement and submitted the IPCC Special Report on Global Warming of 1.5 °C as evidence.

==== UN Climate Action Summit ====
At the UN Climate Action Summit

This is all wrong. I shouldn't be up here. I should be back in school on the other side of the ocean. Yet you all come to us young people for hope. How dare you! You have stolen my dreams and my childhood with your empty words. And yet I'm one of the lucky ones. People are suffering. People are dying. Entire ecosystems are collapsing. We are in the beginning of a mass extinction, and all you can talk about is money and fairy tales of eternal economic growth. How dare you!

— Greta Thunberg, New York
23 September 2019

On 23 September 2019, Thunberg attended the UN Climate Action Summit in New York City. On the same day, the United Nations Children's Fund (UNICEF) hosted a press conference where Thunberg joined 15 other children, including Ayakha Melithafa, Alexandria Villaseñor, Catarina Lorenzo, Ridhima Pandey and Carl Smith.

Together, the group announced they had made an official complaint against five nations that were not on track to meet the emission reduction targets they committed to in their Paris Agreement pledges: Argentina, Brazil, France, Germany, and Turkey. The complaint challenged these countries under the Third Optional Protocol to the Convention on the Rights of the Child. The Protocol is a quasi-judicial mechanism that allows children or their representatives, who believe their rights have been violated, to bring a complaint before the relevant "treaty body", the Committee on the Rights of the Child. If the complaint succeeds, the countries will be asked to respond, but any suggestions are not legally binding.

==== Autumn global climate strikes ====
In late September 2019, Thunberg entered Canada where she participated in climate protests in Montreal, Edmonton and Vancouver, including leading a climate rally as part of the 27 September 2019 Global Climate Strike in Montreal. The school strikes for climate on 20 and 27 September 2019 were attended by over four million people, according to one of the co-organisers. Hundreds of thousands took part in the protest, described as the largest in the city's history. The mayor of Montreal gave her the Freedom of the City award. Prime Minister Justin Trudeau was in attendance, and Thunberg spoke briefly with him.

While in the United States, Thunberg participated in climate protests in New York City with Alexandria Villaseñor and Xiye Bastida; in Washington, D.C., with Jerome Foster II; Iowa City; Los Angeles; Charlotte; Denver with Haven Coleman; and the Standing Rock Indian Reservation with Tokata Iron Eyes. In various cities, Thunberg's keynote speech began by acknowledging that she was standing on land that originally belonged to Indigenous peoples, saying: "In acknowledging the enormous injustices inflicted upon these people, we must also mention the many enslaved and indentured servants whose labour the world still profits from today."

==== Participation at COP25 ====
Thunberg had intended to remain in the Americas to travel overland to attend the 2019 United Nations Climate Change Conference (COP25) originally planned in Santiago, Chile, in December. However, it was announced on short notice that COP25 was to be moved to Madrid, Spain, because of serious public unrest in Chile. Thunberg has refused to fly because of the carbon emissions from air travel, so she posted on social media that she needed a ride across the Atlantic Ocean. Riley Whitelum and his wife, Elayna Carausu, two Australians who had been sailing around the world aboard their 48-foot (15 m) catamaran La Vagabonde, offered to take her. On 13 November 2019, Thunberg set sail from Hampton, Virginia, for Lisbon, Portugal. Her departing message was the same as it has been since she began her activism: "My message to the Americans is the same as to everyone – that is to unite behind the science and to act on the science."

Thunberg arrived in the Port of Lisbon on 3 December 2019, then travelled on to Madrid to speak at COP25 and to participate with the local Fridays for Future climate strikers. During a press conference before the march, she called for more "concrete action", arguing that the global wave of school strikes over the previous year had "achieved nothing" because greenhouse gas emissions were still rising – by 4% since 2015.

==== Further activism in Europe and end of sabbatical year ====
Thunberg addressing the European Parliament's Environment Committee about the European Climate Law, 4 March 2020

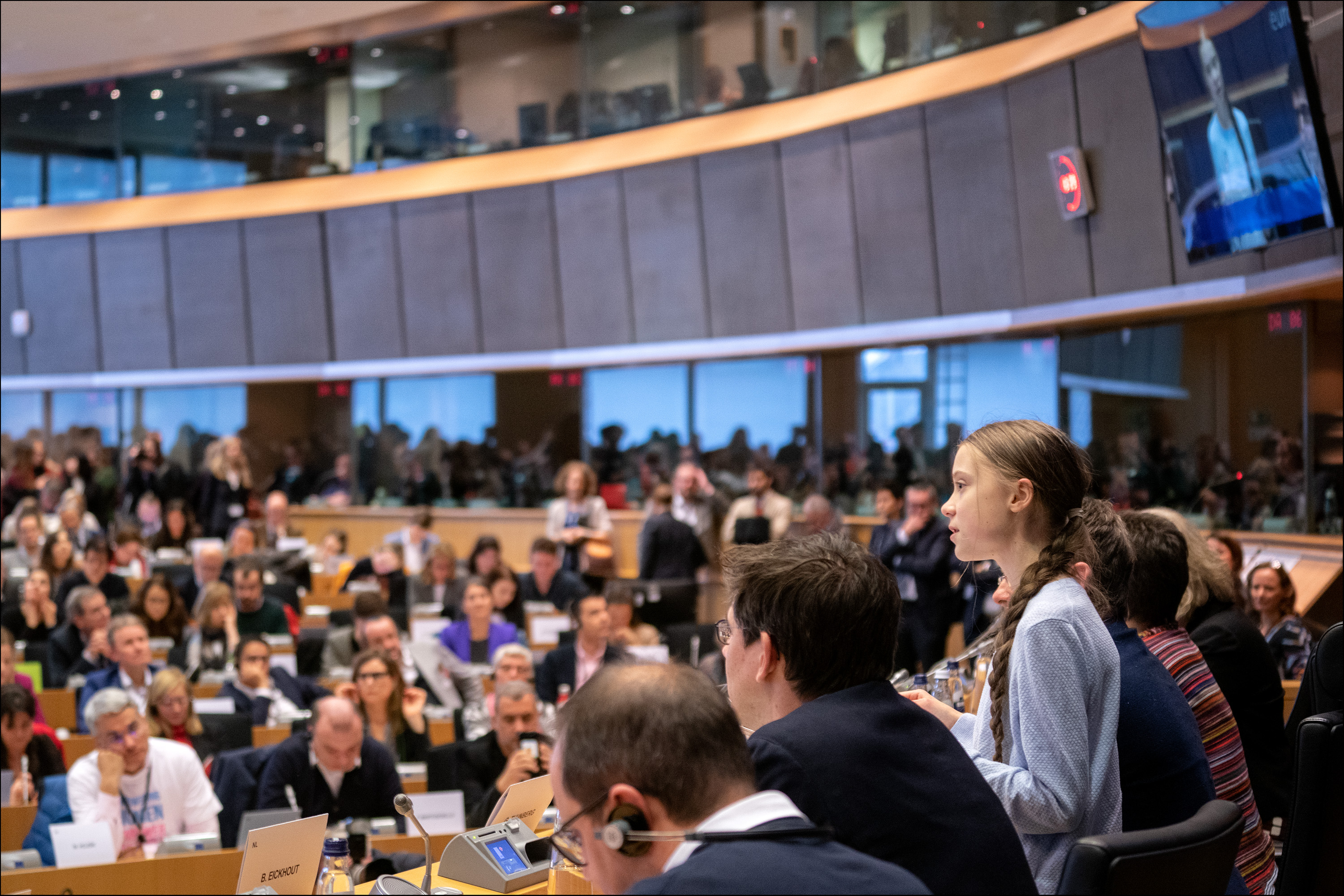
Thunberg is at the far right of the picture.

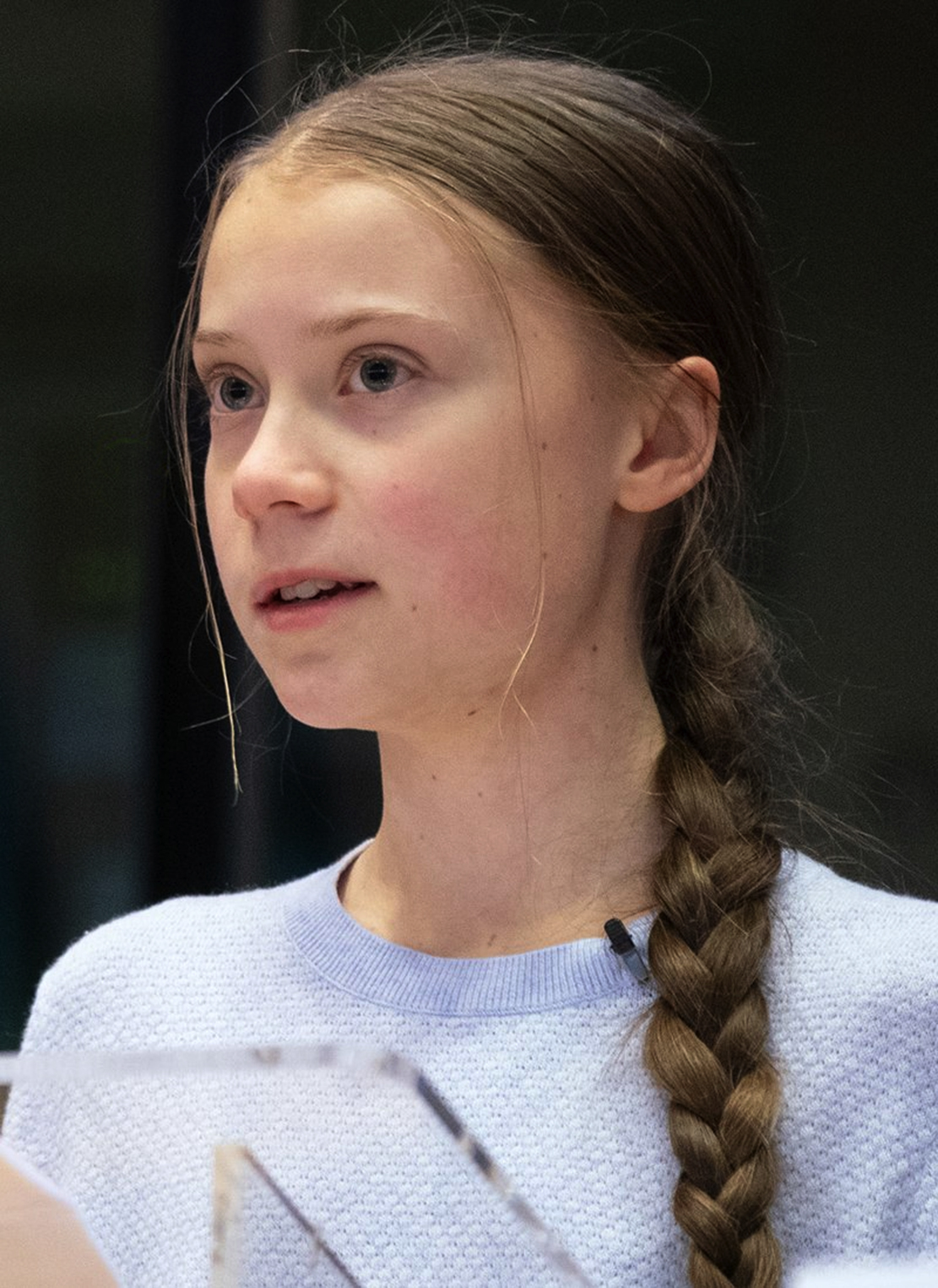

Thunberg was guest editor of the BBC Radio's flagship current affairs programme, the Today Programme in late 2019. It featured interviews on climate change with Sir David Attenborough, Bank of England chief Mark Carney, Massive Attack's Robert Del Naja, and Shell Oil executive Maarten Wetselaar, and was released as a podcast containing these interviews and other highlights. A month later, she called on German company Siemens to stop the delivery of railway equipment to the controversial Carmichael coal mine, operated by a subsidiary of Indian company Adani Group in Australia, but on 13 January, Siemens said that it would continue to honour its contract with Adani.

Thunberg returned to the World Economic Forum held in Davos, Switzerland, on 21 January 2020. She delivered two speeches, and participated in panel discussions hosted by The New York Times and the World Economic Forum. Thunberg used many of the themes contained in her previous speeches, but focused on one in particular: "Our house is still on fire." Thunberg joked that she cannot complain about not being heard, saying: "I am being heard all the time." The next month, she travelled to Oxford University to meet Malala Yousafzai, a Nobel Peace Prize-winning Pakistani activist for female education who had been shot in the head by the Taliban as a schoolgirl. Thunberg was later to join a school strike in Bristol. She also attended an extraordinary meeting of the European Parliament's Environment Committee to talk about the European Climate Law. There she declared that she considered the new proposal for a climate law published by the European Commission to be a surrender.

Thunberg ended her gap year in August 2020. Travel over the next year was restricted because of the COVID-19 pandemic.

==== Activism from 2020 to 2021 ====
In early 2020, the outbreak of the COVID-19 pandemic caused worldwide implementation of mitigation measures, including social distancing, quarantine, and face coverings. On 13 March 2020, Thunberg stated that "In a crisis we change our behavior and adapt to the new circumstances for the greater good of society." Thunberg and School Strike for Climate subsequently moved their activities online. On 20 August 2020, the second anniversary of Thunberg's first strike, Thunberg and fellow climate activists Luisa Neubauer, Anuna de Wever van der Heyden and Adélaïde Charlier met with German Chancellor Angela Merkel in Berlin. They subsequently announced plans for another global climate strike on 25 September 2020. Neubauer said that whether the strike in September is virtual in nature or in the streets would be determined by the pandemic situation. At a joint press conference with fellow activists echoing her sentiment, Neubauer said: "The climate crisis doesn't pause."

On 14 December 2020, Thunberg used Twitter to criticize the New Zealand Labour Government's recent climate change emergency declaration as "virtue signalling", tweeting that New Zealand's Labour Government had only committed to reducing less than one per cent of New Zealand's carbon emissions by 2025. In response, New Zealand Prime Minister Jacinda Ardern and climate change Minister James Shaw defended New Zealand's climate change declaration as only the start of the country's climate change mitigation goals. On 29 December 2020, during a BBC interview, Thunberg said that climate experts are not being listened to despite the COVID-19 pandemic highlighting the importance of using science to address such issues. She added that the COVID-19 crisis had "shone a light" on how "we cannot make it without science".

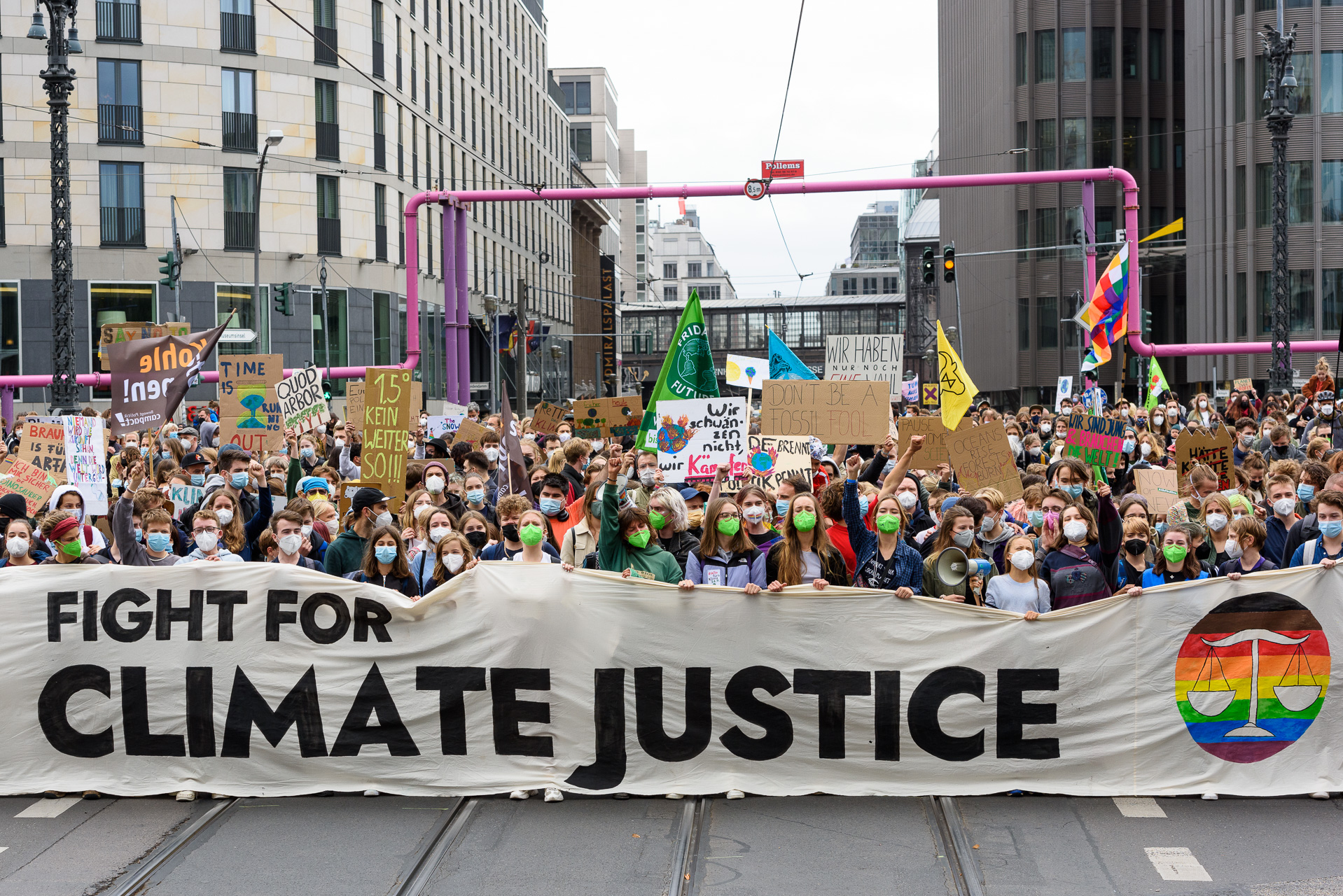
Thunberg with a megaphone leading an event in Berlin, 2021

Thunberg and other climate activists launched the annual Climate Live concert to highlight climate change. Their first concert was held in April 2021. In May 2021, she addressed the COVID-19 crisis again, when she urged a change in the food production system and the protection of animals and their habitats. Thunberg's comments, which came amidst calls for meat-free alternatives, also addressed health concerns regarding animal welfare and the environment. Thunberg said that the way humans are destroying habitats are the perfect conditions for the spread of diseases and noted zoonotic illnesses such as COVID-19, Zika, Ebola, West Nile fever, SARS, MERS, among others. In July 2021, Thunberg received her COVID vaccine, saying: "I am extremely grateful and privileged to be able to live in a part of the world where I can already get vaccinated. The vaccine distribution around the world is extremely unequal. No one is safe until everyone is safe. But when you get offered a vaccine, don't hesitate. It saves lives."

The inaugural edition of Vogue Scandinavia (August–September 2021) had a cover photograph of Thunberg shot by Swedish photography and conservationist duo Iris and Mattias Alexandrov Klum and an interview with her. The cover shows Thunberg wearing a trench coat while sitting with an Icelandic horse in a woodland outside Stockholm. In the interview, Thunberg criticized the promotional campaigns the fashion industry uses to appear sustainable without "actually doing anything to protect the environment" and called the campaigns "greenwashing". On the same day, she used Twitter to criticize the fashion industry as "a huge contributor" to the climate and ecological "emergency" and "not to mention its impact on the countless workers and communities who are being exploited around the world in order for some to enjoy fast fashion that many treat as disposables". Thunberg's wearing of wool during the photoshoot garnered criticism from other vegans, who said it promoted animal cruelty. According to People for the Ethical Treatment of Animals (PETA), she was unaware that the clothing was made of real animal-derived wool.

On 28 September 2021, Thunberg criticized US president Joe Biden, British prime minister Boris Johnson, Indian prime minister Narendra Modi and other world leaders over their promises to address the climate crisis in a speech at the Youth4Climate Summit in Milan. Thunberg also criticized and doubted organizers of climate conferences, saying, "They invite cherry-picked young people to meetings like this to pretend they are listening to us. But they are not." A month later, Thunberg took part in a protest in London, demanding that the financial system stop funding companies and projects that use fossil fuels, such as coal, oil and natural gas. The protest in London is part of a series taking place at the financial centres around the world, including New York City, San Francisco and Nairobi, Kenya. She told the BBC journalist Andrew Marr that banks should "stop funding our destruction", ahead of the coming climate summit. At the 2021 United Nations Climate Change Conference (COP26) in Glasgow, Thunberg attended a panel on climate change hosted by British actress Emma Watson.

In November 2021, Thunberg, along with other climate activists, filed a petition to the United Nations, calling it to declare a level 3 global climate emergency, with the aim of creating a special team that will coordinate the response to the climate crisis at an international level. In December 2021, Thunberg reiterated her criticism of US president Joe Biden, saying, "If you call him a leader – I mean, it's strange that people think of Joe Biden as a leader for the climate when you see what his administration is doing", alluding to the United States expansions on use of fossil fuels during the Biden administration. Thunberg further lamented that activists and teenagers are needed to bring awareness about climate change.

==== Activism from 2022 to early 2023 ====
In early 2022, Thunberg condemned the British firm Beowulf and its mining of iron on Sámi land. She said, "We believe that the climate, the environment, clean air, water, reindeer herding, indigenous rights and the future of humanity should be prioritized above the short-term profit of a company. The Swedish government needs to stop the colonization of Sapmi." Following the invasion of Ukraine by Russian military forces, she combined her usual Friday climate protests to include opposing the invasion. She stood outside the Russian embassy in Stockholm holding a sign that read "Stand With Ukraine". On 29 June 2023, Thunberg met with Ukrainian President Volodymyr Zelenskyy and other prominent European figures to form a working group to address ecological damage from the 16-month-old Russian invasion.

Thunberg criticized the European Parliament in 2022 for voting to label fossil gas and nuclear energy as "green" energy. She called that decision "hypocrisy", and stated that "This will delay a desperately needed real sustainable transition and deepen our dependency on Russian fuels. The hypocrisy is striking, but unfortunately not surprising." In November , Thunberg, along with over 600 young people from a youth-led Swedish activist group Auroramålet, filed a lawsuit in a Stockholm district court against the Swedish government for climate inaction within Sweden. The Nacka District Court subsequently allowed the class action lawsuit that posits Sweden has an "insufficient climate policy" to proceed.

In late 2022, The Climate Book was released. The book, written by Thunberg, is a compilation in which she brought together over one hundred experts – geophysicists, oceanographers and meteorologists; engineers, economists and mathematicians; historians, philosophers and indigenous leaders – who wrote essays focusing on changes to the Earth's climate. Thunberg also contributed writings to the book and is credited as its author. She donated her copyright and all royalties generated by the book to her foundation and will not personally profit from sales or other commercial uses. While on her 2022 midterm break from school, Thunberg embarked on a publicity campaign for the book's initial release; it is published under Penguin's Allen Lane Imprint books. An extract from The Climate Book and reviews are available.

In January 2023, Thunberg spoke during a protest in Lützerath, calling on the German authorities to stop the expansion of a nearby coal mine. She was detained along with other activists by German police while demonstrating at the opencast coal mine of Garzweiler 2, around 9 kilometres (5.6 mi) from the village on 17 January, after police warned the group that they would be detained unless they moved away from the edge of the mine. The mine's owner RWE had earlier agreed with the government on demolishing Lützerath in exchange for a faster exit from coal and the saving of five villages originally slated for destruction. She was released the same day after an identity check.

==== Post-high school graduation ====
Thunberg graduated from high school in June 2023 and marked the day by attending what would be her last school strike for climate protest before receiving her diploma. She wore the Swedish traditional graduation white dress and white studentmössa (cap) to the protest, and vowed to continue, saying that her "fight has only just begun". In Thunberg's subsequent protest pictures on social media, some of the group photos have featured "School Strike for Climate" signage. Later in the year, she began a bachelor's program at Stockholm University.

In June 2023, Thunberg took part in a Reclaim the Future protest in Malmö, Sweden, and was charged with disobeying a police order. A trial was held at Malmö District Court where the prosecution presented its case against Thunberg for disobedience to authority after having disrupted traffic and refusing to follow police orders. While she acknowledged that the facts of the case against her were accurate, Thunberg said that due to the existential and global threat to the climate caused by the fossil fuel industry, her protest was a form of self-defence. She was sentenced by the court to pay fines totalling SEK 2,500 (equivalent to US$240). Within hours after the court convicted her, Thunberg attended a similar protest where Reclaim the Future again blocked oil tankers on a road in Malmö. She was again forcibly removed by police and later criminally charged. A second Swedish trial for disobedience (disobeying a police order to disperse) took place in October. She was found guilty for the earlier incident and ordered to pay fines totalling SEK 4,500 (equivalent to $414).

Thunberg cancelled an appearance at the Edinburgh International Book Festival in August to promote her book: The Climate Book. She said that as a climate activist she could not attend an event sponsored by Baillie Gifford – an investment management firm – due to its connections with the fossil fuel industry. In making the announcement, the festival's Nick Barley said that he was disappointed but respected Thunberg's decision. "I share Greta's view that in all areas of society the rate of progress is not enough." He went on to say: "The book festival exists to give a platform for debate and discussion around key issues affecting humanity today – including the climate emergency ... We strongly believe that Baillie Gifford are part of the solution to the climate emergency." In its response, Baillie Gifford said that it was not a significant fossil fuel investor, with 2% of its clients' money being invested in companies with some business related to fossil fuels while the market average was 11%.

Thunberg was arrested in London that October for protesting against the Energy Intelligence Forum, described as the "Oscars of oil" as part of demonstrations organized by campaigning group Fossil Fuel London. She was charged with failure to comply with a lawful order to disperse, a "condition imposed under Section 14 of the Public Order Act". She appeared at Westminster Magistrates' Court and entered a plea of "not guilty". Early the following year, the case was dismissed by the presiding judge after the prosecution rested. The judge agreed with the defence that "the crown had failed to present enough evidence to prove their case".

In April 2024, Thunberg participated in an Extinction Rebellion–led protest in The Hague where law enforcement forcibly removed her from blocking a road. She then joined another group of Extinction Rebellion protesters who were blocking a different road and was again removed. The BBC and some other media outlets reported that Thunberg was arrested while some media outlets only mention that she was detained. It is unclear whether criminal charges were – or will be – filed. Shortly afterwards, she was charged with civil disobedience for allegedly ignoring police orders to leave two climate demonstrations which law enforcement claim were blocking Sweden's parliament building in March. Her refusal to comply with police orders caused her to be forcibly removed. Thunberg entered a plea of not guilty. A Swedish court convicted her and she was fined kr 6,000 (equivalent to US$550). Thunberg was also ordered to pay an additional kr 1,000 (equivalent to US$92) in damages.

In June 2025, Thunberg participated in the Budapest Pride to protest its ban by the Hungarian parliament. On 26 July 2025, Thunberg joined the protests in North Macedonia against the construction of a hydroelectric power plant on the Došnica River on the Kožuf Mountain. On 31 July 2025, Thunberg joined the Serbian anti-corruption protests in Belgrade against Aleksandar Vučić's regime.

==== Anti-logging activism ====
In October 2025, she joined the protests against SCA, a Swedish logging company, in northern Sweden. The protest was organized by the environmental activist group Skogsupproret. The objective of the protest was to pressure SCA to cease its logging of old forests in and around Sámi lands. In a video interview with public broadcaster SVT, she said, "In an escalating climate and biodiversity crisis, we should prioritize better and the Sámi village has said a clear no." SCA started logging in the area a week prior to the protests.

==== COP30 protest ====
On 24 November 2025, Thunberg and 35 other activists of the Extinction Rebellion group dyed Venice's Grand Canal bright green as part of a climate protest. She was banned from the city for 48 hours and fined €150 (about $172). Luca Zaia, President of Veneto, accused Thunberg and the other activists of "risk[ing] ... consequences for the environment." The activists said that the dye they used was environmentally harmless. The protest was timed to coincide with the conclusion of the COP30 climate conference in Brazil.

==== COP31 ====
In November 2026, Thunberg participated in the COP31 in Antalya, Turkey, for the first time in five years. She accused host countries of using the annual climate conferences to improve their public image and criticised the influence of lobbyists representing environmentally harmful industries. She also condemned governments for their inadequate response to climate change, connected global warming with armed conflicts and called for the defence of human rights.

=== Pro-Palestinian activism ===
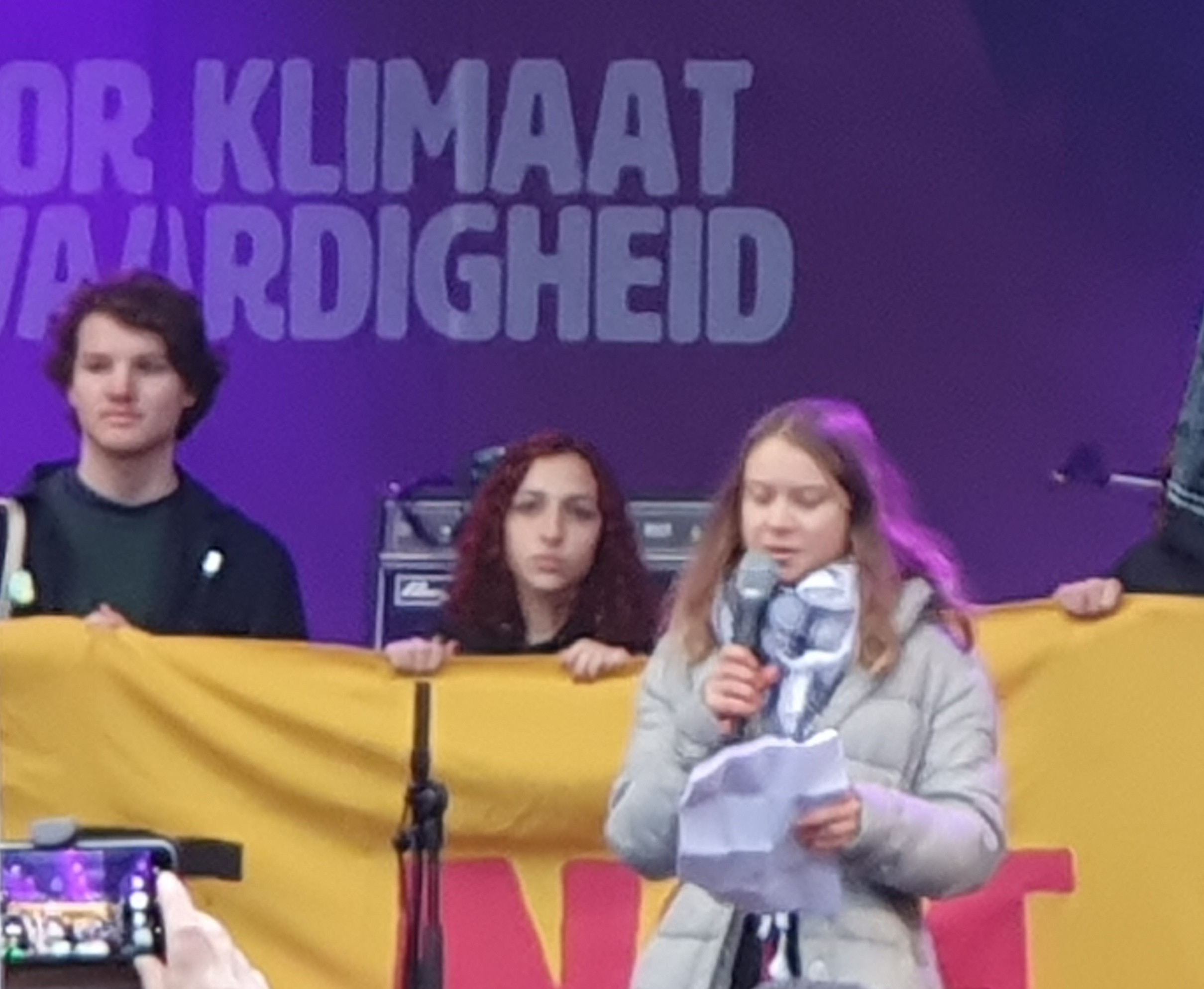
Thunberg wearing a keffiyeh in solidarity with Palestine at an event in Amsterdam in 2023

On 20 October 2023, Thunberg posted a photo during her usual Friday climate protests, showing her and three other protesters holding signs. One sign read "climate justice now" and the other three displayed support for Palestinians in the Gaza Strip amidst the Gaza war. Her posts on X (formerly Twitter) and Instagram also included fourteen links to "Palestine solidarity" social media accounts where, she said, "you can find information on how you can help." Thunberg was immediately criticized for not condemning the October 7 attacks. The following day Thunberg posted "It goes without saying – or so I thought – that I'm against the horrific attacks by Hamas. As I said, 'the world needs to speak up and call for an immediate ceasefire, justice and freedom for Palestinians and all civilians affected.'" The Israeli Ministry of Education responded to Thunberg's initial "statements in support of Gaza without condemning Hamas" by removing "various references in the educational curriculum that present Thunberg as a role model and a source of inspiration for youth".

In December 2023, Thunberg, along with three researchers and activists affiliated with Fridays for Future Sweden, published an opinion piece in The Guardian titled "We won't stop speaking out about Gaza's suffering – there is no climate justice without human rights." The piece set out her and FFF Sweden's support for Palestinian civilians in the Gaza Strip amidst the Gaza war. The article stated that "All Fridays for Future groups are autonomous, and this article represents the views of nobody but FFF Sweden." They also addressed the criticism that Fridays for Future has been radicalized and is engaging in politics by stating that the organization has always been political because it is a movement for justice. FFF Sweden believes that "means speaking up when people suffer, are forced to flee their homes or are killed – regardless of the cause". Fridays for Future International, while not taking a side in conflicts, does take an anti-war stance – it issued an appeal stating that stopping the ecological crisis requires peace and disarmament as it requires stopping overconsumption and GDP directly feeds military potential. 24 organizations including Scientist Rebellion as well as 61 scientists including Michael Meeropol and Don Trent Jacobs endorsed the appeal.

Thunberg was detained by Swedish police for taking part in a pro-Palestinian protest outside Malmö Arena in May, which was hosting the Eurovision Song Contest 2024, and subsequently released a statement opposing Israel's participation in the contest. In September, Danish police apprehended Thunberg during a pro-Palestinian protest in Copenhagen against the Gaza war. Thunberg, along with five others, was detained after blocking the entrance to a building at the University of Copenhagen. Less than a week later, she was "carried out" from the library of Stockholm University by Stockholm police after she participated in an encampment inside the library. She characterized the police response as a "repression". Following those incidents, she was labelled "antisemite of the week" by StopAntisemitism. While speaking at a pro-Palestine rally in the German city of Mannheim in December, Thunberg said "Fuck Germany and fuck Israel." In response, local CDU politician Manuel Hagel accused Thunberg of "moving very consciously in close proximity to anti-Semitism". Reflecting on her pro-Palestine activism, Thunberg stated:

For me, it hasn't been solely about the climate at all. The media often wants to simplify things, like 'she's the one who works on climate.' They want to put a face to the issue. I mean, we're talking about climate justice. All forms of justice are included within climate justice. In the last year, when I started getting involved in Palestinian activism, that view has shifted.

In November 2025, she participated in numerous events and protests during the events of the 2025 Italian general strikes and protests for Gaza.

On 23 December 2025, Thunberg was arrested by City of London Police for holding a placard, during a demonstration in support of pro-Palestinian activists, who were undertaking a hunger strike while they were remanded in custody in the United Kingdom prison system. The protest group l, Prisoners for Palestine released footage showing Thunberg holding a placard reading, "I support Palestine Action prisoners. I oppose genocide," referencing the ongoing Gaza genocide. She was later released on bail while the police investigate offences contrary to Section 13 of the Terrorism Act 2000.

==== Gaza humanitarian aid flotillas ====
In October 2023, Israel intensified its ongoing blockade of the Gaza Strip after the 7 October attacks, by announcing a "total blockade" of imports including food, water, medicine, fuel and electricity, which Amnesty International and Thunburg have described as systematic starvation and genocide, and resulted in increased global scrutiny and criticism of Israel's actions. Various international efforts to break the blockade have been made by flotillas of small private vessels with the goal to deliver humanitarian aid. Flotilla organizers have argued that Israel's intentions are a violation of the Geneva Conventions against intentionally starving civilians, while Israel has argued that its blockades had been declared legal by a United Nations panel of inquiry in 2011 because their intent was to prevent Hamas from smuggling weapons into Gaza.

In May 2025, Thunberg planned to join a Gaza Freedom Flotilla at a Maltese port. The plans were cancelled when one of the vessels, the Conscience, was attacked by drones in international waters off the coast of Malta before it could dock, setting it on fire and breaching its hull.

A month later, she joined the June 2025 Gaza Freedom Flotilla aboard the UK-flagged vessel Madleen. It was organized by the Freedom Flotilla Coalition which had a 15-year history of similar attempts, many of which were blocked by Israeli forces. Also aboard were high-profile figures including activist Thiago Ávila and MEP Rima Hassan, the latter previously barred from Israel for her pro-Palestinian stance; initially, actor Liam Cunningham was also meant to embark. In the early morning on 9 June, Madleen was boarded by the Israel Defense Forces in international waters, under the orders of Israel Defense Minister Israel Katz. This came after accusations from the crew on the board of harassment from Israeli ships and drones. At 3:34 am (GMT+3), a video from Thunberg was posted to the Freedom Flotilla Coalition X (Twitter) account, recorded in advance in the case that the ship was seized before reaching Gaza. Shortly after, Israel's Ministry of Foreign Affairs stated that the boat had been seized and was being taken to the Ashdod port. She was deported from Israel the day after. In an interview, Thunberg said it was "a bit unclear" why she was released while others remained detained, and that they had not entered the country illegally. Remarking on Thunberg's aid effort, Trump described her as "strange" and "angry". Upon arriving in Paris following her deportation from Israel, Thunberg responded, "I think the world needs a lot more young angry women, to be honest. Especially with everything going on right now."

Following the Israeli capture of the Gaza Freedom Flotilla in July 2025, Thunberg joined the Global Sumud Flotilla. She said that she and some others had signed a document stating they wished to leave Israel as soon as possible to take part in the Sumud Flotilla, which set sail from Barcelona on 31 August to begin its journey to Gaza. According to its crew, the Madleen was carrying a "symbolic amount of aid", and was intercepted by Israeli special forces on 1 October 2025 in international waters, approximately 70 nautical miles (≈115 km) off the Gaza coast. A total of 45 vessels were seized and 462 activists were detained between 1–3 October 2025, bringing an end to what is considered the largest civilian effort to break the siege of Gaza. According to The Times, detainees from the flotilla are believed to be held at the notorious Ktzi'ot Prison while awaiting deportation. Several released activists and organizations have said that Thunberg was mistreated while detained, including that she was beaten, paraded while draped in an Israeli flag and held in bedbug-infested conditions with insufficient food and water. Israeli authorities denied the allegations. On 6 October 2025, Thunberg was deported together with other activists, arriving in Sweden the next day. She stated that she and other participants in the Gaza flotilla were tortured while held in an Israeli prison, though she noted that their mistreatment was minor compared with what civilians in Gaza endure on a daily basis. Israel's foreign ministry has repeatedly rejected allegations of mistreatment. According to Israeli detention court records, Thunberg did not report any personal mistreatment during her detention.

The day after her deportation, Thunberg posted to Instagram about the mistreatment of Palestinian inmates in Israeli prisons. One of the photos used in the post was of an emaciated Evyatar David, an Israeli hostage held by Hamas, suggesting he is a Palestinian prisoner suffering in an Israeli prison. David's family and others condemned Thunberg for the misleading use of the photo and called on her to take it down.

=== Activism in other social justice areas ===
==== Boycott of COP29 ====
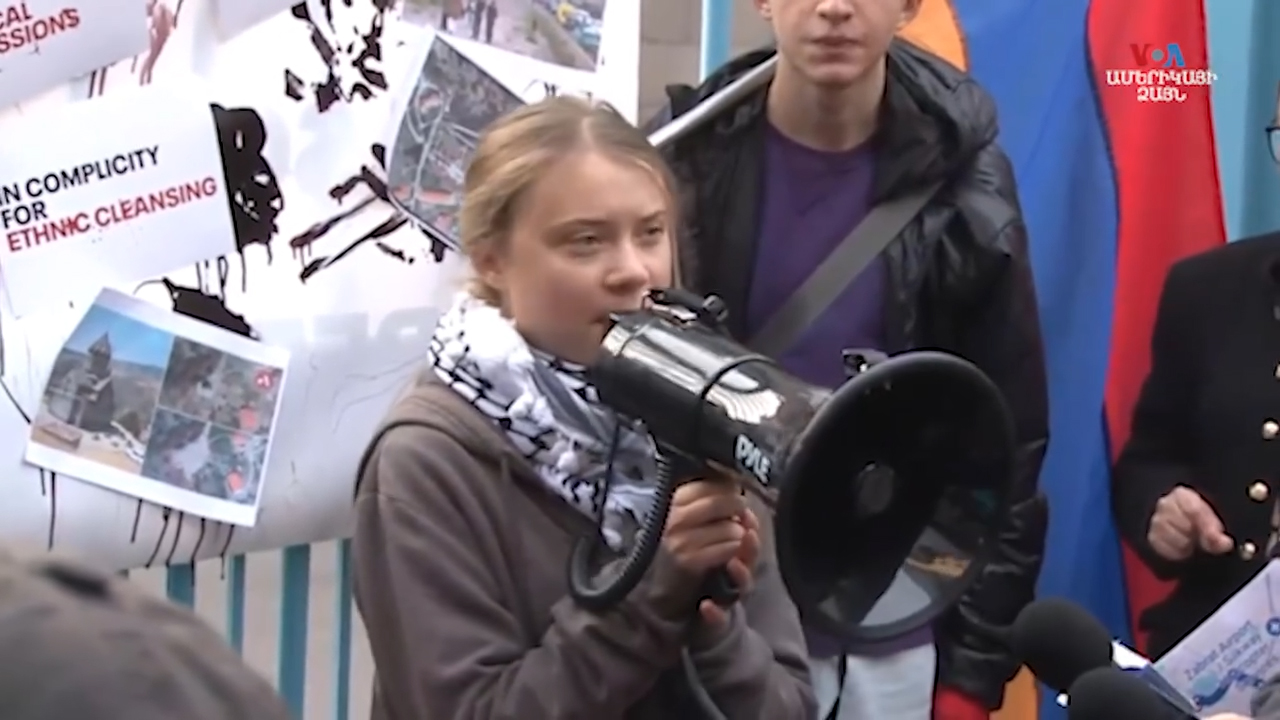
Thunberg's protest in front of the UN office in Yerevan, Armenia, 16 November 2024

Thunberg boycotted COP29, hosted in 2024 in Azerbaijan by the regime of autocratic leader Ilham Aliyev, due to human rights violations and ethnic cleansing of Armenians in the disputed Nagorno-Karabakh, and instead visited neighbouring Georgia and Armenia. While in Georgia, she joined a political demonstration against Georgia's government in Tbilisi, stating: "I am here to express my support and solidarity to all activists and citizens who are coming forward to defend their fundamental rights such as freedom, justice and democracy." In an interview, she said that "The only thing that will come out of [COP29] is loopholes, more negotiations, and symbolic decisions that look good on paper but are really just greenwashing."

She then visited Armenia, where she argued that "We need to stop hosting climate conferences in places like Azerbaijan, a country that is repressing its own population to an extreme degree." At a demonstration in front of the United Nations delegation headquarters in Yerevan, she stated "We urge international media and those in power who are in Baku to go and visit Armenian hostages and demand an immediate release to all political prisoners, prisoners of war and hostages." While in Armenia, she also visited Pink Armenia, which stated "We extend our gratitude to Greta Thunberg for raising Armenia's critical issues on international platforms and for showing her solidarity with the LGBT+ movement". She also visited the Armenian genocide memorial in Yerevan, stating, "Now it's up to each and everyone of us to continue spread awareness and demand justice. Never again for anyone."

==== Western Sahara ====
In January 2025, Thunberg visited Sahrawi refugee camps near Tindouf, Algeria, and participated in the International Solidarity Conference with the Sahrawi People. During the visit, she expressed support for Sahrawi self-determination and criticized the international community's response to the Western Sahara conflict. She subsequently used her social-media platform to call for greater awareness of the Sahrawi cause, linking the issue to climate justice, human rights and decolonization.

==== 2026 Cockroach protests ====
On 26 July 2026, Thunberg joined a rally at London's Trafalgar Square in support of India's 'cockroach' protest. At the rally, she said, "The Indian student protest has made us all proud!" and "we all have to come together now and rise up in solidarity with India."

==== 2026 French school protests ====
On 13 October 2026, Thunberg joined demonstrators on the streets of the Paris suburb Saint-Denis, and spoke in support of demands for future public investment in education. The number of people backing the largely peaceful protests across the country were estimated by the Interior Ministry at 161,000.

== Position on climate change ==
A video of Thunberg speaking at the 2019 World Economic Forum in Davos

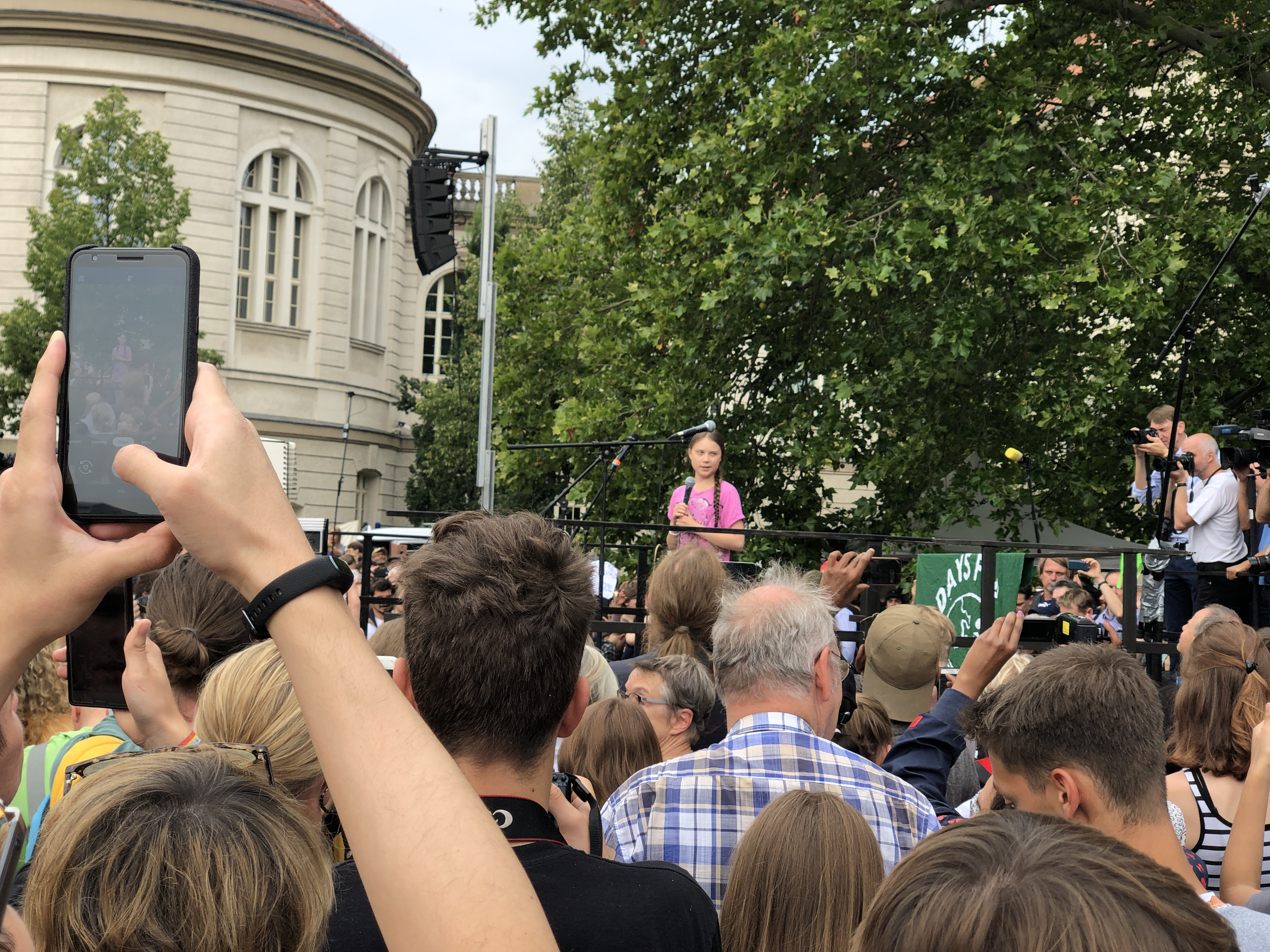
Thunberg delivering a speech at a July 2019 school strike for climate change in Berlin

Thunberg states that humanity is facing a crisis that could threaten its very existence because of global warming and holds the baby boomers, and each subsequent generation, responsible for creating and perpetuating detrimental changes to the Earth's climate. She uses graphic analogies (such as "our house is on fire") to highlight her concerns and often speaks bluntly to business and political leaders about their failure to take concerted action.

Thunberg has said that climate change will have a disproportionate effect on young people, whose futures will be profoundly affected. She argues that her generation may not have a future any more because "that future was sold so that a small number of people could make unimaginable amounts of money." She also has said that people in the Global South will suffer most from climate change, even though they have contributed least in terms of carbon dioxide emissions. Thunberg has voiced support for other young activists from developing countries who are already facing the damaging effects of climate change. Speaking in Madrid in December 2019, she said: "We talk about our future, they talk about their present."

Speaking at international forums, she berates world leaders because she believes that too little action is being taken to reduce global emissions. She says that lowering emissions is not enough, that emissions need to be reduced to zero if the world is to keep global warming to less than 1.5 °C. Speaking to the British Parliament in April 2019, she said: "The fact that we are speaking of 'lowering' instead of 'stopping' emissions is perhaps the greatest force behind the continuing business as usual." To take the necessary action, she added that politicians should not listen to her, they should listen to what the scientists are saying about how to address the crisis. According to political scientists Mattia Zulianello and Diego Ceccobelli, Thunberg's ideas can be defined as technocratic ecocentrism, which is grounded on "the exaltation of the vox scientifica".

More specifically, Thunberg has argued that commitments made at the Paris Agreement are insufficient to limit global warming to 1.5 °C, and that the greenhouse gas emissions curve needs to start declining steeply no later than 2020 – as detailed in the IPCC's Special Report on Global Warming of 1.5 °C published in 2018. In February 2019, at a conference of the European Economic and Social Committee, she said that the EU's current intention to cut emissions by 40% by 2030 is "not sufficient to protect the future for children growing up today" and that the EU must reduce their CO_{2} emissions by 80%, double the 40% goal.

Thunberg reiterated her views on political inaction in a November 2020 interview where she stated that "leaders are happy to set targets for decades ahead, but flinch when immediate action is needed." She criticized the European Green Deal, which aims to make the European Union carbon neutral by 2050, saying that it "sends a strong signal that real and sufficient action is being taken when in fact it's not. Nature doesn't bargain, and you cannot make deals with physics."

In July 2020, Thunberg, Luisa Neubauer, Anuna De Wever and Adélaïde Charlier wrote an open letter to all EU leaders and heads of state stating they must "advocate to make ecocide an international crime at the International Criminal Court." In June 2023, Thunberg called the destruction of the Kakhovka dam in Ukraine by Russia an ecocide and called for prosecution, stating "Russia needs to be held accountable for their action and for their crimes. The eyes of the world are on them now".

In an interview shortly before the 2021 United Nations Climate Change Conference (COP26) in Glasgow, Thunberg, asked how optimistic she was that the conference could achieve anything, responded, "Nothing has changed from previous years, really. The leaders will say, 'we'll do this and we'll do this, and we will put our forces together and achieve this', and then they will do nothing. Maybe some symbolic things and creative accounting and things that don't really have a big impact. We can have as many COPs as we want, but nothing real will come out of it." She called Chinese president Xi Jinping "a leader of a dictatorship" and said that "democracy is the only solution to the climate crisis, since the only thing that could get us out of this situation is ... massive public pressure."

On 30 October 2021, she arrived at Glasgow Central station for the COP26. She spoke at some protests during the COP and marched in a Fridays for Future Scotland climate strike on Friday 5 November; she said in an earlier interview that the public needed to "uproot the system". She delivered a speech to protesters in which she described COP26 as a failure, speaking of "blah blah blah" and greenwashing.

== Public response and impact ==
=== Academics ===
In February 2019, 224 academics signed an open letter of support, stating that they were inspired by Thunberg's actions and by the schoolchildren who went on strike to make their voices heard.

=== Politicians ===
Thunberg has met with many politicians and world leaders but said she could not think of a single politician who has impressed her. Asked about New Zealand Prime Minister Jacinda Ardern, who described the climate crisis as a matter of life or death, Thunberg commented, "It's funny that people believe Jacinda Ardern and people like that are climate leaders. That just tells you how little people know about the climate crisis." Thunberg says that she ignores words and sentiments: "Obviously the emissions haven't fallen. It goes without saying that these people are not doing anything." In fact, New Zealand's greenhouse-gas emissions had increased by 2% in 2019.

United Nations Secretary-General António Guterres endorsed the school strikes initiated by Thunberg, admitting: "My generation has failed to respond properly to the dramatic challenge of climate change. This is deeply felt by young people. No wonder they are angry." Speaking at an event in New Zealand in May 2019, Guterres said his generation was "not winning the battle against climate change" and that it was up to the youth to "rescue the planet".

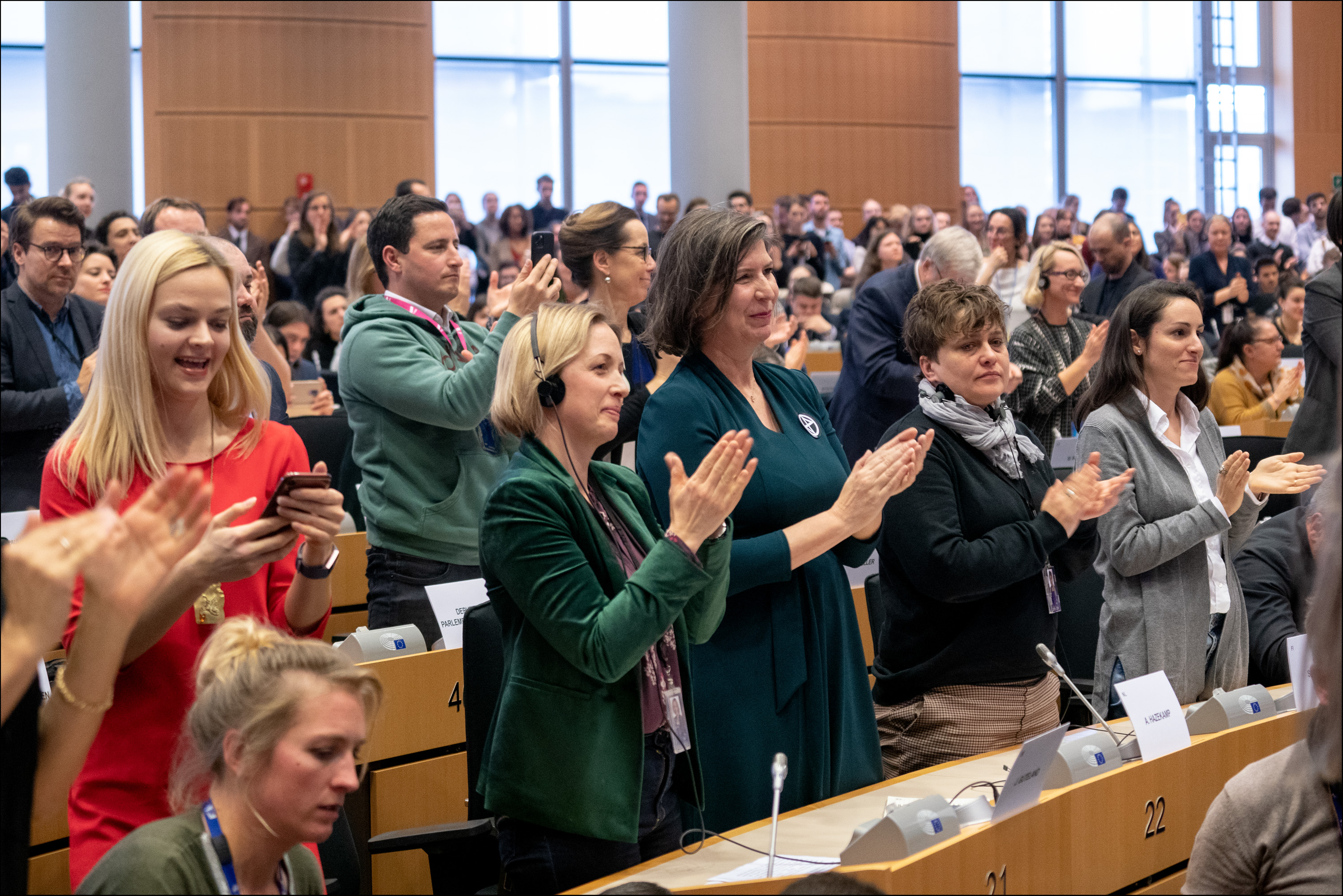
Thunberg urges MEPs to show climate leadership, receives standing ovation, 2020.

Democratic candidates for the 2020 United States presidential election, including Kamala Harris, Beto O'Rourke, and Bernie Sanders, expressed support after her speech at the September 2019 action summit in New York. German Chancellor Angela Merkel indicated that young activists such as Thunberg had driven her government to act faster on climate change.

Thunberg and her campaign have been criticized by politicians as well, ranging from personal attacks to statements that she oversimplifies the complex issues involved. Among them are the Australian prime minister Scott Morrison, German chancellor Angela Merkel, French president Emmanuel Macron, Russian president Vladimir Putin, OPEC (Organization of the Petroleum Exporting Countries) and, repeatedly, US president Donald Trump.

In September 2019, Trump shared a video of Thunberg angrily addressing world leaders, along with her quote that "people are dying, entire ecosystems are collapsing. We are in the beginning of a mass extinction." Trump wrote about Thunberg, tweeting: "She seems like a very happy young girl looking forward to a bright and wonderful future. So nice to see!" Thunberg reacted by changing her Twitter bio to match his description, and stating that she could not "understand why grown-ups would choose to mock children and teenagers for just communicating and acting on the science when they could do something good instead." In December 2019, Trump again mocked Thunberg after she was named Person of the Year for 2019 by Time, tweeting: "So ridiculous. Greta must work on her Anger Management problem, then go to a good old fashioned movie with a friend! Chill Greta, Chill!" Thunberg responded by changing her Twitter biography to: "A teenager working on her anger management problem. Currently chilling and watching a good old fashioned movie with a friend." During the 2020 United States presidential election, Thunberg commented on Trump tweeting "Stop the count!" with the text: "So ridiculous. Donald must work on his Anger Management problem, then go to a good old fashioned movie with a friend! Chill Donald, Chill!"

In October 2019, Putin described Thunberg as a "kind girl and very sincere", while suggesting she was being manipulated to serve others' interests. Putin criticized her as "poorly informed", adding, "No one has explained to Greta that the modern world is complex and different and people in Africa or in many Asian countries want to live at the same wealth level as in Sweden." Similar to her reaction to Trump, Thunberg updated her Twitter bio to reflect Putin's description of her. In December 2019, Thunberg tweeted: "Indigenous people are literally being murdered for trying to protect the forest from illegal deforestation. Over and over again. It is shameful that the world remains silent about this." When asked about this subject two days later, then Brazilian president Jair Bolsonaro responded, "Greta said that the Indians were dying because they were trying to protect the Amazon. It is impressive how the press gives voice to such a brat." On the same day, Thunberg changed her Twitter description to pirralha, the Portuguese word for 'brat' used by Bolsonaro.

In a Time story published in May 2019, Thunberg addressed the criticism she has received online, saying, "It's quite hilarious when the only thing people can do is mock you, or talk about your appearance or personality, as it means they have no argument or nothing else to say." Former US vice-president and Trump's eventual successor Joe Biden responded to Trump's mockery of Thunberg after she was named the Time's Person of the Year 2019 by tweeting at Trump: "What kind of president bullies a teenager? @realDonaldTrump, you could learn a few things from Greta on what it means to be a leader."

On 30 March 2021, European Commissioner for Climate Action Frans Timmermans said in a tweet after talking to Thunberg that "The Commission remains committed" to making the Common Agricultural Policy "fulfill the objectives" of the European Green Deal.

=== Press ===
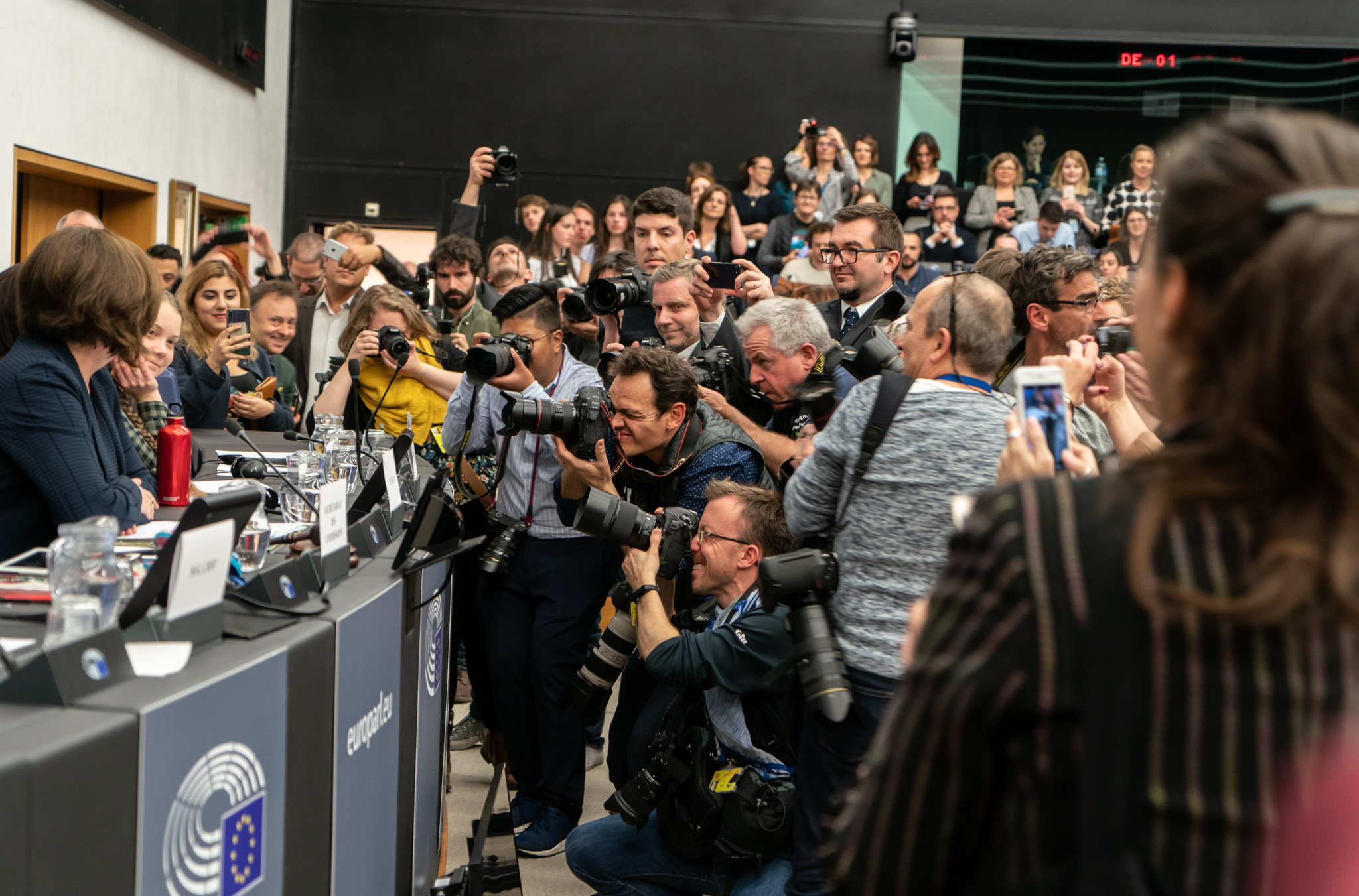
Thunberg swarmed by the press at the European Parliament, 2019

In August 2019, Scott Walsman wrote in Scientific American that Thunberg's detractors have "launched personal attacks", "bash [her] autism", and "increasingly rely on ad hominem attacks to blunt her influence". Writing in The Guardian, Aditya Chakrabortty said that columnists including Brendan O'Neill, Toby Young, the blog Guido Fawkes, as well as Helen Dale and Rod Liddle at The Spectator and The Sunday Times, had been making "ugly personal attacks" on Thunberg. British TV presenter Piers Morgan also mocked Thunberg. As part of its climate change denial, Germany's right-wing populist party Alternative for Germany (AfD) has attacked Thunberg "in fairly vicious ways", according to Jakob Guhl, a researcher for the Institute for Strategic Dialogue.

Arron Banks's Twitter post saying that "freak yachting accidents do happen in August" in reference to Thunberg, outraged a number of British MPs (Members of Parliament), celebrities, and academics. Tanja Bueltmann, founder of EU Citizens' Champion, said Banks had "invoked the drowning of a child" for his own amusement and said that most of those attacking Thunberg "are white middle-aged men from the right of the political spectrum". Writing in The Guardian, Gaby Hinsliff said Thunberg has become "the new front in the Brexit culture war", arguing that the outrage generated by personal attacks on Thunberg by Brexiteers "gives them the welcome oxygen of publicity".

In September 2019, Nick Gillespie wrote in Reason that "Greta Thunberg's histrionics are likely heartfelt but neither they nor the deplorable responses they conjure are a guide forward to good environmental policy in a world that is getting richer every day." In August 2021, Yasmeen Serhan wrote in The Atlantic that Thunberg had become "the target of a barrage of disinformation and conspiracies" from the far-right and populist right, "including depictions of her as a spoiled child, a leftist pawn, and even a Nazi".

=== "The Greta effect" ===
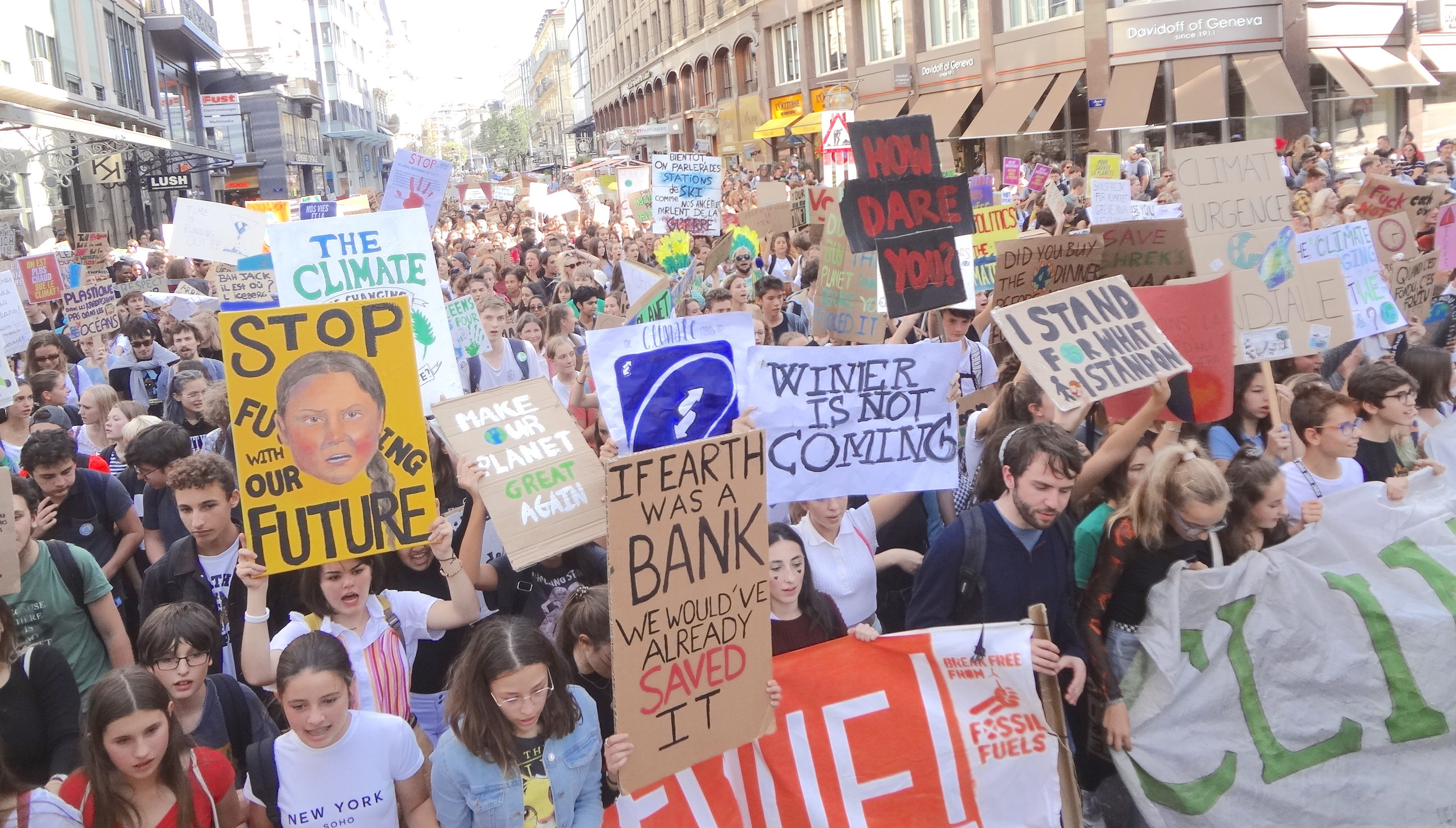
September 2019 climate strike in Geneva

In summarizing Thunberg's global impact on the climate debate, the BBC encapsulated her influence: "she is credited with raising public awareness of climate change across the world, especially amongst young people. Many commentators call this 'the Greta effect'".

In response to her outspoken stance, various politicians have also acknowledged the need to focus on climate change. Britain's secretary for the environment, Michael Gove, said, "When I listened to you, I felt great admiration, but also responsibility and guilt. I am of your parents' generation, and I recognise that we haven't done nearly enough to address climate change and the broader environmental crisis that we helped to create." Labour politician Ed Miliband, who was responsible for introducing the Climate Change Act 2008, said, "You have woken us up. Thank you. All the young people who have gone on strike have held up a mirror to our society ... you have taught us all a really important lesson. You have stood out from the crowd."

In February 2019, Thunberg shared a stage with the president of the European Commission Jean-Claude Juncker where he outlined: "In the next financial period from 2021 to 2027, every fourth euro spent within the EU budget will go towards action to mitigate climate change." Climate issues also played a significant role in European Parliament election in May 2019, as Green parties recorded their best ever results, boosting their MEP seat numbers from 52 to 72. Many of the gains came from northern European countries where young people have taken to the streets inspired by Thunberg.

In June 2019, a YouGov poll in Britain found that public concern about the environment had soared to record levels in the UK since Thunberg and Extinction Rebellion had "pierced the bubble of denial". In August 2019, publication and sales of children's books about the climate crisis reportedly doubled compared to the previous year. Publishers attribute this to the "Greta effect". An increase in searching for 'Climate Crisis' and similar climate related terms on Google has been linked to the Greta effect.

In November 2019, Margaret Atwood called Thunberg "the Joan of Arc of the environment".

Inspired by Thunberg, wealthy philanthropists and investors from the United States have donated about US$600,000 to support Extinction Rebellion and school strike groups to establish the Climate Emergency Fund. Trevor Neilson, one of the philanthropists, said the three founders would be contacting friends among the global mega-rich to donate "a hundred times" more in the weeks and months ahead. In December 2019, the New Scientist described the impact made by Thunberg and Extinction Rebellion with the headline: "The year the world woke up to climate change."

According to a 2021 study, "those who are more familiar with Greta Thunberg have higher intentions of taking collective actions to reduce global warming and that stronger collective efficacy beliefs mediate this relationship. This association between familiarity with Greta Thunberg, collective efficacy beliefs, and collective action intentions is present even after accounting for respondents' overall support for climate activism."

=== Flight shame ===
Thunberg has spearheaded the anti-flying movement, promoting rail travel over flying on environmental grounds. The buzzword associated with this movement is flight shame. It is a phenomenon in which people feel social pressure not to fly because of the rising greenhouse gas emissions of the airline industry. It was originally championed by Swedish Olympic athlete Björn Ferry, but has gained significant momentum after Thunberg's refusal to fly on environmental grounds. Thunberg backed the campaign to fly less and made it part of her 2019 "awareness tour" in Europe.

Sweden reported a 4% drop in domestic air travel for 2019 and an increase in rail use. The BBC says that the movement could halve the growth of global air travel, but Airbus and Boeing say that they still expect to grow at around 4% until 2035. In June 2019, Swedish Railways (SJ) reported that the number of Swedes taking the train for domestic journeys had risen by 8% from the previous year, reflecting growing public concern about the impact of flying on CO_{2} emissions.

=== X-Site sticker ===
In February 2020, X-Site Energy Services of Alberta, Canada, distributed a sticker with the company's name and an image of a man grabbing the braids of a girl to rape her from behind. The girl in the image was labelled "Greta". Then 17-year-old Thunberg posted about it on Twitter: "They are starting to get more and more desperate. This shows that we're winning." Although the general manager of X-Site initially said that neither X-Site nor any X-Site employee was involved in making the sticker, X-Site Energy later apologized, admitting that they had distributed it and assumed full responsibility. The letter said that they were destroying known extant copies and making organizational changes to prevent future incidents.

== In popular culture and art ==
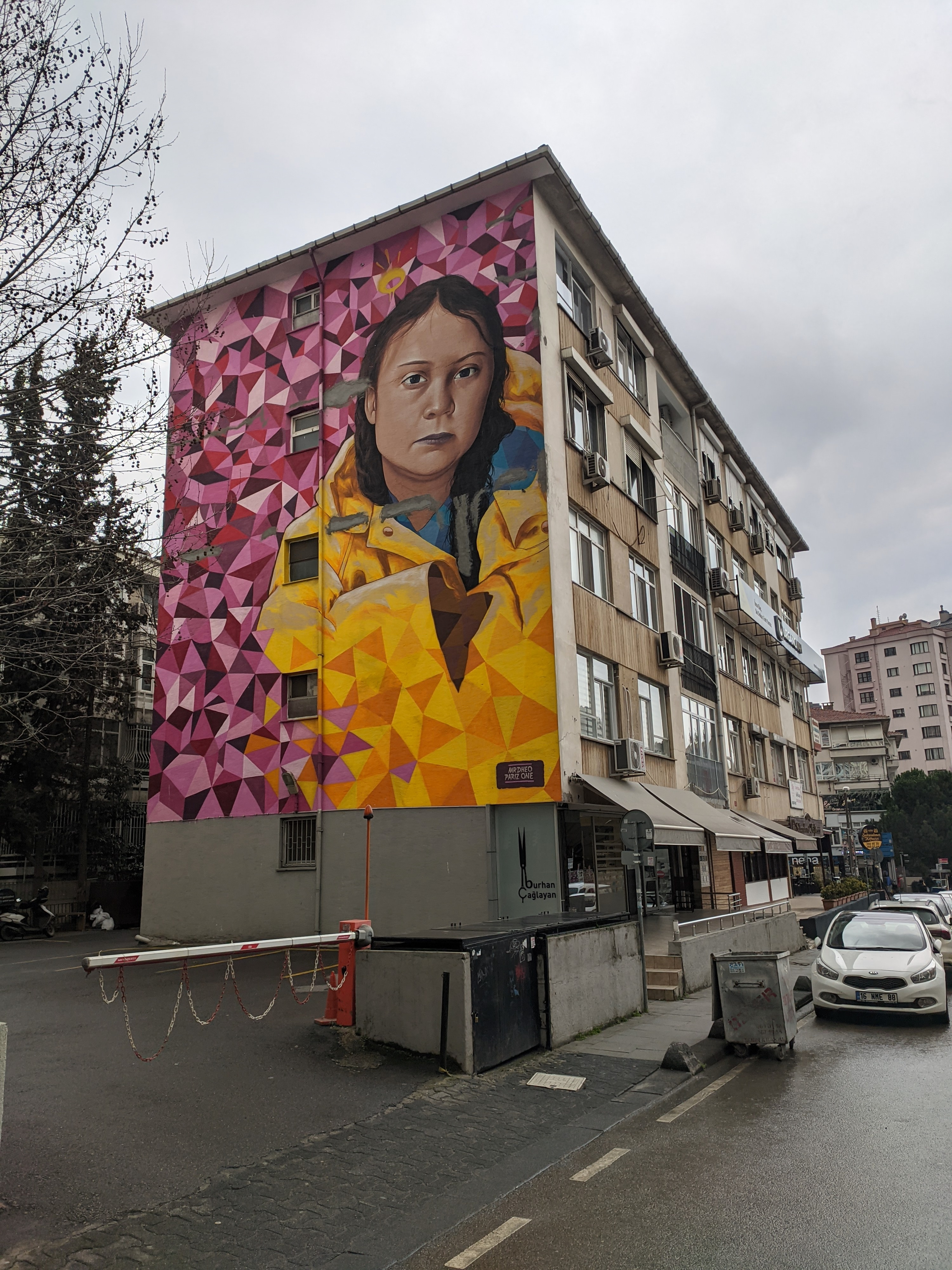
A multi-storey mural of Thunberg in Istanbul, Turkey

Thunberg has been depicted in popular culture and art. Greta and the Giants, a book by Zoë Tucker and Zoe Persico, published by Frances Lincoln Children's Books, was inspired by the life of Thunberg. Argentinian artist Andrés Iglesias unveiled an 18-meter mural of Thunberg above Mason street, near Union Square in San Francisco. American painter Elizabeth Peyton chose her 2019 portrait Greta Thunberg as the leading image of one of her shows. She has been depicted in multiple murals. In Bristol, a 15-metre-high (49 ft) mural of Thunberg by artist Jody Thomas, portrays the bottom half of her face as if under rising sea water since May 2019. Thunberg was featured on the Time magazine cover in May 2019 issue, where she was described as a role model and one of the "Next Generation Leaders". She and fifteen others were featured on the cover of the fashion magazine British Vogue created by guest editor Meghan, Duchess of Sussex, in September 2019.

Some of Thunberg's speeches have been incorporated into music. In 2019, Thunberg contributed a voiceover for a release of "The 1975", a song by the English band by the same name. Thunberg finishes the song by urging: "So, everyone out there, it is now time for civil disobedience. It is time to rebel." Proceeds will go to Extinction Rebellion at Thunberg's request. In September 2019, John Meredith set her UN Action Summit speech to death metal. The Australian musician Megan Washington and composer Robert Davidson used the same 'how dare you' speech, for a performance at an event exploring the future of music. DJ Fatboy Slim created a mashup of this speech with his dance hit "Right Here, Right Now".

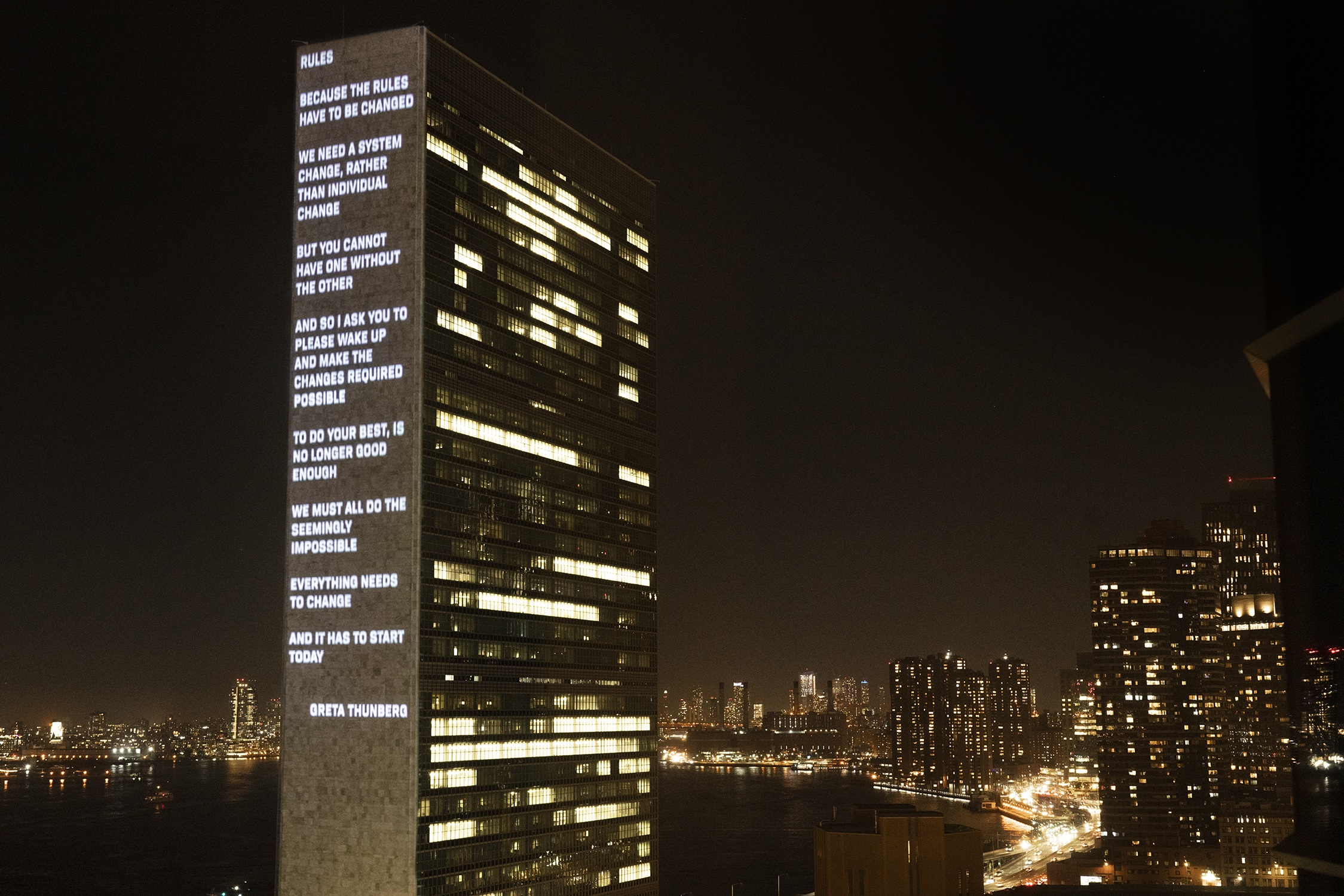
Project Pressure, Voices for the Future, projected a quote by Thunberg onto the United Nations building in New York in the lead up to the UN Climate Action Summit, 2019.

In 2019, Thunberg collaborated with the climate charity Project Pressure on an art piece projected onto the United Nations Secretariat Building in New York in the lead up to that year's UN Climate Action Summit featuring the voices of six young activists, including Thunberg herself. Visualized by Joseph Michael, authored by Klaus Thymann and music by Brian Eno, their commentary was on the climate crisis and the urgent actions that need to be taken to minimize its consequences.

In May 2020, Thunberg was featured in Pearl Jam's music video "Retrograde". She appears as a fortune teller, with images in her crystal ball depicting startling effects of climate change in numerous countries.

On 3 September 2020, the Hulu cinéma vérité-esque documentary I Am Greta had its world premiere at the Venice Film Festival. The film was directed by Nathan Grossman, who single-handedly operated the camera and sound equipment while memorializing Thunberg's climate activism "from the first solitary days of her school strike in August 2018, all the way through to her two-week sea voyage across the Atlantic Ocean from Europe to New York City to attend the United Nations Climate Summit in September 2019." Following its Venice premiere, the film had its North American premiere at the Toronto International Film Festival on 11 September 2020, and opened in cinemas across Europe, North America and Australia in October.

In March 2021, the University of Winchester installed a life-sized sculpture of Thunberg on its campus. BBC Studios made a three-part series Greta Thunberg: A Year to Change the World, with planned visits to various countries omitted due to the COVID-19 pandemic.

== Honours and awards ==
Thunberg has received honours and awards over the course of her activism. In May 2018, before the start of her school strike, she was one of the winners of a climate change essay competition by Svenska Dagbladet (The Swedish Daily News) for young people. Thunberg has refused to attend ceremonies or accept prizes if it requires her to fly, such as for the International Children's Peace Prize. She has received prizes from various non-governmental organizations but also from scientific institutions that lauded her success in raising awareness.

- Time's 25 most influential teens of 2018, December 2018, an annual list compiled by Time magazine of the most influential teenagers in the world that year.
- Fryshuset scholarship, 2018, for Young Role Model of the Year.
- Nobel Peace Prize nomination, 2019, by three deputies of the Norwegian parliament. Again in 2020 by two Swedish lawmakers. Nominated in 2021, 2022 and 2023.
- Swedish Woman of the Year (Årets Svenska Kvinna), March 2019, awarded by the Swedish Women's Educational Association to "a Swedish woman who, through her accomplishments, has represented and brought attention to the Sweden of today in the greater world."
- Rachel Carson Prize, March 2019, awarded to a woman who has distinguished herself in outstanding work for the environment in Norway or internationally.
- Goldene Kamera film and television awards, March 2019, special Climate Action Award. Thunberg dedicated the prize to the activists protesting against the destruction of the Hambach Forest, which is threatened by lignite mining.
- Fritt Ord Award, April 2019, shared with Natur og Ungdom, which "celebrates freedom of speech". Thunberg donated her share of the prize money to a lawsuit seeking to halt Norwegian oil exploration in the Arctic.
- Time 100, April 2019, by Time magazine, an annual list of the 100 most influential people in the world for that year.
- Laudato si' Prize, April 2019, awarded by the Milarepa Foundation of Chile and selected by the International Laudato Si' Group members under the second encyclical of Pope Francis, "on care for our common home".
- Honorary degree of Doctor honoris causa (dr.h.c.), May 2019, conferred by the Belgian University of Mons (Mons, Belgium) for "contribution ... to raising awareness on sustainable development".
- Ambassador of Conscience Award, June 2019, Amnesty International's most prestigious award, for her leadership in the climate movement, shared with Fridays for Future.
- The Freedom Prize, July 2019, a prize from Normandy. She donated the prize money (25,000 euros) to four groups working for climate justice.
- The Geddes Environment Medal, July 2019, by the Royal Scottish Geographical Society, for "an outstanding practical, research or communications contribution to conservation and protection of the natural environment and the development of sustainability."
  - Honorary Fellowship of the Royal Scottish Geographical Society (FRSGS), July 2019, automatically conferred with the Geddes award.
- Right Livelihood Award, September 2019, from the Right Livelihood Foundation and known as Sweden's alternative Nobel Prize, one of four 2019 winners, "for inspiring and amplifying political demands for urgent climate action reflecting scientific facts."
- Keys to the City of Montreal, September 2019, by Mayor Valérie Plante.
- International Children's Peace Prize, October 2019, shared with 14-year-old Divina Maloum from Cameroon, awarded by the KidsRights Foundation.
- Maphiyata echiyatan hin win (lit. 'Woman Who Came from the Heavens'), Lakota tribal name conferred, October 2019, at Standing Rock Indian Reservation, following support for the Dakota Access pipeline opposition, after being invited by Tokata Iron Eyes, a 16-year-old Lakota climate activist.
- Nordic Council Environment Prize, October 2019. Thunberg declined to accept the award or the prize money of DKK 350,000 (equivalent to €47,000 as of October 2019) stating that Nordic countries were not doing enough to cut emissions.
- Time Person of the Year, December 2019, by Time magazine, the first recipient born in the 21st century and the youngest ever. For succeeding in "creating a global attitudinal shift, transforming millions of vague, middle-of-the-night anxieties into a worldwide movement calling for urgent change." And: "For sounding the alarm about humanity's predatory relationship with the only home we have, for bringing to a fragmented world a voice that transcends backgrounds and borders, for showing us all what it might look like when a new generation leads."
- Glamour Woman of the Year Award 2019, 12 November 2019, by Glamour magazine. Accepted by Jane Fonda, quoting Thunberg as saying "If a Swedish, teenage, science nerd who has shopstop, (Note: Shopstop: Curtailment of shopping activity; shopping only when necessary.) refuses to fly and has never worn makeup or been to a hairdresser can be chosen a Woman of the Year by one of the biggest fashion magazines in the world then I think almost nothing is impossible."
- She was recognized as one of the BBC's 100 women of 2019.
- Nature's 10, December 2019, an annual list of ten "people who mattered" in science, produced by the scientific journal Nature, specifically, for being a "climate catalyst: A Swedish teenager [who] brought climate science to the fore as she channeled her generation's rage."
- Forbes list of The World's 100 Most Powerful Women, 2019
- Forbes 30 under 30 Europe 2020 – Social Entrepreneurs
- Human Act Award, on Earth Day, 22 April 2020, by the Human Act Foundation, for "her fearless and determined efforts to mobilize millions of people around the world to fight climate change." The USD100,000 prize money was donated to UNICEF and doubled by the Foundation.
- Best in Activism (from Tech & Innovation category) at the 12th Shorty Awards, on 3 May 2020.
- Gulbenkian Prize for Humanity, in July 2020, the first recipient of this prize. Through her foundation, Thunberg donated the €1,000,000 prize money "to charitable projects combatting the climate and ecological crisis and to support people facing the worst impacts, particularly in the Global South."
- Women in Youth Activism Award at the 2021 Women of Europe Awards on 2 December 2021, for "courageous leadership in support for climate justice, social change and youth community organising".
- Honorary Doctor of Laws (LLD), 31 May 2021, conferred by the University of British Columbia, Okanagan Campus, for "her international recognitions for challenging world leaders to take immediate action against climate change."
- Honorary Doctor of Theology conferred by Helsinki University. The doctorate was scheduled to be granted in June 2023.

=== Species named in Thunberg's honour ===
The following species have been described and named after Thunberg:

- Nelloptodes gretae, by Michael Darby, Natural History Museum, UK, December 2019, a new species of beetle from Kenya in the family Ptiliidae. Its long antennae bear a passing resemblance to her braided pigtails.
- Craspedotropis gretathunbergae, by Schilthuizen et al., 2020, a new species of land snail from Borneo in the family Cyclophoridae.
- Thunberga greta, in a new genus Thunberga gen nov, both by Peter Jäger, June 2020, a new species of east African huntsman spider in the family Sparassidae. As of April 2022 the new Thunberga genus contained twenty-nine newly described spiders, all from Madagascar and Mayotte, many in honour of other inspirational young people.
- Opacuincola gretathunbergae, by Verhaege & Haase, 2021, a new freshwater snail from New Zealand in the family Tateidae.
- Pristimantis gretathunbergae, by Mebert et al., 2022, a species of frog native to Panama.

== Works ==
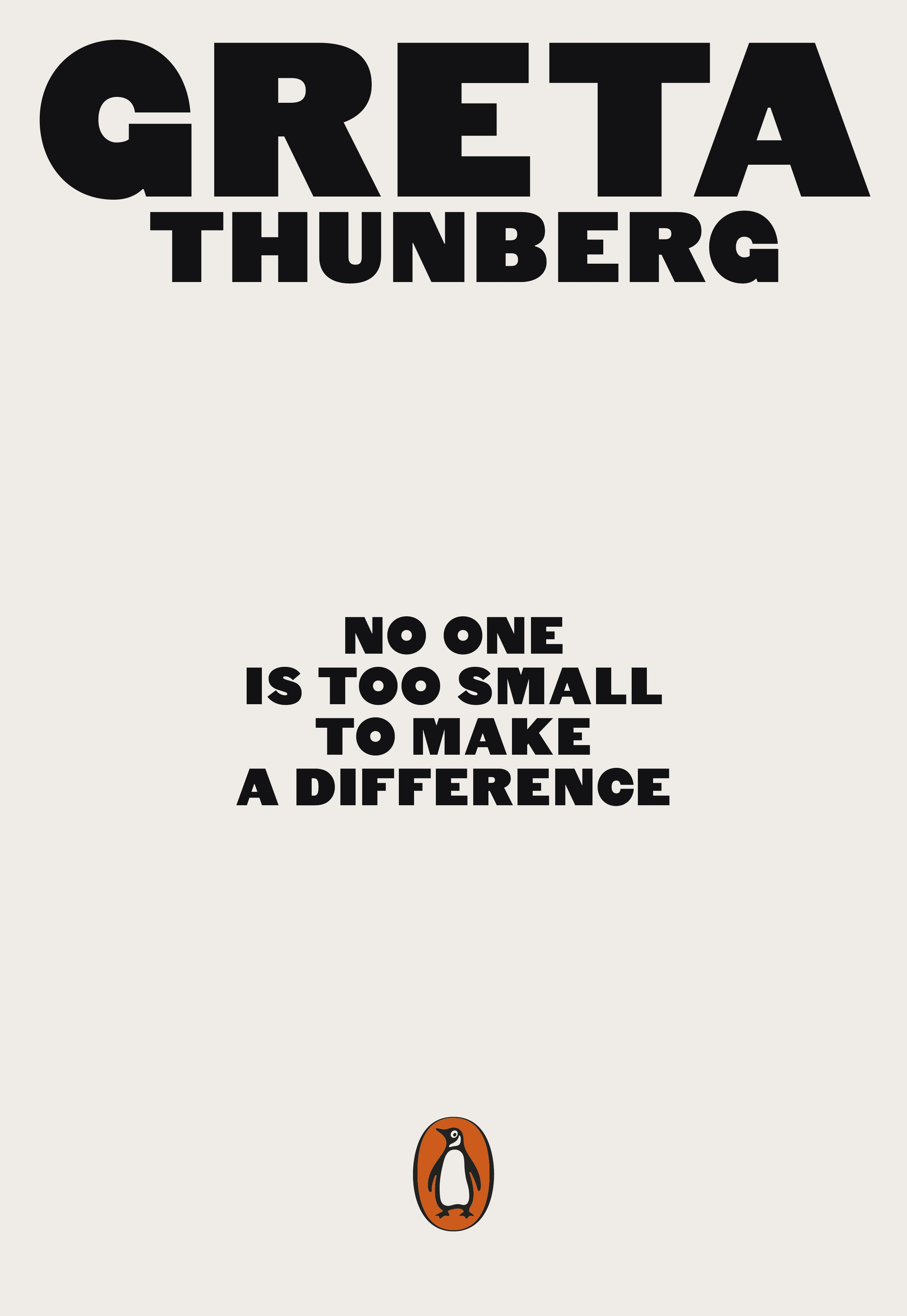
For No One Is Too Small to Make a Difference, Thunberg was named author of the year by Waterstones.

- Scenes from the Heart (2018), with her sister, father and mother.
- Thunberg, Greta (2019). No One Is Too Small to Make a Difference. Penguin Books. ISBN 978-0-241-51457-3. OCLC 1196840691. 96 pages. A collection of Thunberg's climate action speeches, with the earnings being donated to charity.
- "Greta Thunberg Speeches and Interviews". What Would Greta Do?. Archived from the original on 6 April 2020. An archived compilation of Thunberg's speeches and interviews, and IPCC Reports, up to March 2020
- Thunberg, Greta (November 2019). "The Disarming Case to Act Right Now on Climate Change". Stockholm: TED (conference).
- Ernman, Malena; Thunberg, Greta; Ernman, Beata; Thunberg, Svante (2021). Our House Is on Fire: Scenes of a Family and a Planet in Crisis. Penguin Books. ISBN 978-0-14-199288-4. OCLC 1179047026. 288 pages
- Thunberg, Greta; Calderón, Adriana; Jhumu, Farzana Faruk; Njuguna, Eric (2021-08-19). "Opinion | This Is the World Being Left to Us by Adults". The New York Times. ISSN 0362–4331. Retrieved 2022-05-16.
- Thunberg, Greta (October 2022). The Climate Book. London, United Kingdom: Allen Lane (Penguin Books). ISBN 978-0-241-54747-2. Hardback.

== See also ==
- Juliana v. United States – A lawsuit by 21 youths against the United States for significantly harming their right to life and liberty. It sought to force the government to adopt methods for reducing greenhouse gas emissions.
- List of most-liked tweets – Which lists two tweets by Thunberg
- Svante Arrhenius – Climate scientist and distant relative of Greta
