= Most Affected People and Areas =

Slang term for groups and territories strongly affected by climate change

Most Affected People and Areas, also known by its acronym MAPA, is a term that represents groups and territories disproportionately affected by climate change, such as women, indigenous communities, racial minorities, LGBTQIA+ people, young, older and poorer people and the Global South. The term and concept is interconnected with intersectionality. Countries in Africa and Asia, including India, Sub-Saharan Africa, and coastal communities of Asia, identify as MAPA territories, in part due to the lasting impacts of colonialism. In particular, with the rise of grassroots movements that had the goal of climate justice - such as Fridays for Future, Ende Gelände or Extinction Rebellion - the connection of these groups in the context of climate justice became more important. The acronym MAPA is preferred by climate activists compared to terms like the Global South, as it better acknowledges the issue of climate justice.

== Communities that Makeup MAPA ==
MAPA consists not only of states, but individual communities as well. Countries that are most affected by climate change include South Africa, Indonesia, India, Nigeria, Malaysia, Myanmar, Vietnam, and Thailand. As climate change evolves, so does the number of communities that make up MAPA. The countries listed are not a defined total. Communities that are most affected by climate change include Native Americans, ethnic groups within Africa, and the LGBTQIA+. These communities are often viewed as expendable by their nation's governments and, therefore, are exploited by their governments. These communities often live in areas that contain environmental harms, including air pollution, water pollution, and limited farmland for food supply. These communities often cannot relocate to safer land due to issues such as socio-economic and laws formed by the government.

To view a visual map of MAPA communities click this link. Countries with lighter colors rank lower on the Environmental Performance Index (EPI), which equates to a lower potential for climate resiliency compared to countries with darker colors. These countries are considered MAPA.

== Colonialism's Effects on the Most Affected People and Areas ==
In 2022, the Intergovernmental Panel on Climate Change (IPCC) mentioned colonialism for the first time in its Climate Change report. Leading IPCC climate scientists acknowledged that colonialism is both a historic and ongoing driver of the climate crisis. Colonialism is the act of conquering a foreign state and maintaining control through the exploitation of the nation's citizens and resources. Colonialism is often referred to in a historical context; however, colonialism of communities today is still ongoing.

According to Climate Justice Activists from Friday for Future, who are widely regarded as the group who popularized MAPA, “The countries that benefit the most from industrialization are also the ones that initiated and fueled the climate crisis.” The most successful countries today, including nations in North America and West Europe, are often also those that participated in colonialism and continue to do so today. Since the 18th century, the United States has colonized Native American land, exploiting both Indigenous individuals and their resources. Due to this exploitation, indigenous communities have become a part of MAPA.

The current habitation of MAPA communities can be attributed to colonialism. With control over the people, colonists often pushed European cultures onto the locals, forcing them to either adapt or remove them from their land. In the 19th century, Indigenous communities in the United States were continually pushed westward to the Mid-West, as the land they owned contained valuable natural resources. For example, Citizen Potawatomi philosopher Kyle Powys Whyte has shown that in the United States, colonialism is still ongoing, with the limited Indigenous land being targeted for oil pipelines and uranium mining.

== Organizations That Recognize MAPA ==
MAPA is recognized by organizations such as Fridays for Future, the United Nations Environmental Programme, the World Economic Forum, the IPCC, and several grassroots organizations. Acknowledging MAPA communities is a primary step that organizations can take to address environmental injustices. A key component of MAPA is intersectionality, which describes the ways that identities based on race, gender, class, etc. intersect with one another. Intersectionality needs to be brought to the forefront of climate action to aid MAPA communities.

Fridays for Future is accredited for popularizing the term MAPA. Fridays for Future is a youth-led movement that began in 2018 by several young climate activists, including Greta Thunberg. With over 14 million members, the organization's goal is to overcome the climate crisis and create a society that lives in harmony with its fellow beings.

Several Fridays for Future activists have begun to advocate for MAPA communities at several climate conferences, including Climate Week in New York City. MAPA activist Mitzi Jonelle Tan stresses that MAPA voices are unheard, not voiceless. Fridays for Future amplifies the voices of MAPA communities from across the globe to organizations that can aid in climate remediation.

MAPA communities have begun to be heard at climate conferences across the globe. The Conference of Parties (COP) is an international climate meeting held each year by the United Nations. At each meeting, government representatives report on progress, make agreements on intermediate goals, and negotiate policy. The most recent COP, COP28, was held in Expo City, Dubai. Nigeria, a MAPA country, tied with China in fourth place for the largest number of registered delegates representing its country for COP28. At the summit, Nigeria and Germany signed a performance agreement to improve Nigeria's electricity supply. The annual COP meetings have provided a stage for those who identify as MAPA to be given a voice that will be listened to.

== Example: Myanmar ==
Myanmar, a country in Southeast Asia, is considered a MAPA country. It has a population of 54 million and is composed of over 100 ethnic groups. The country gained independence in January 1948 after over a hundred years of British colonial rule. The effects of British colonialism have left Myanmar unsettled, causing economic struggles that are aided by international sanctions by countries such as the United States. Due to economic instability rooted in colonialism, Myanmar has struggled to develop a reliable economy of its own, creating difficulties for fighting climate change.

Myanmar has a tropical climate with long coastlines. Cyclones frequently occur in areas with dense populations in Yangon. The central area of Myanmar is threatened by flooding and droughts, depending on the season. It is considered to be one of the most vulnerable countries in the world to climate change's impacts. In 2021, the United Nations Myanmar Information Management Unit estimated that 21 million people in Myanmar were vulnerable to climate change.

The government of Myanmar has taken incentives against climate change. The Myanmar Climate Change Alliance (2013–2019) was a project funded by the European Union designed to raise awareness about climate change impacts and address them through proper government legislation. The United Nations-Habitat and United Nations Environmental Programme were additional organizations that aided in implementing the policy. Achievements of the project included:

- Establishment of an institutional structure focused on coordinating climate action on a national level
- Development of a climate change strategy and policy framework
- Improving local citizen action on climate change resilience
- Applying gender considerations in terms of climate change action

In 2019, Myanmar published the National Climate Change Strategy, the first government publication dedicated to climate resilience. The strategy created an outline for the country's transition to a climate-resilient, low-carbon society focused on preserving its resources for future generations.

Prior to the start of the 2021 Myanmar Civil War, the Myanmar government was fully dedicated to climate remediation for its country. The Myanmar civil war, also called the Burmese Spring Revolution, is an ongoing civil war following insurgencies within the country. Many environmental activists within the country have fled, gone into hiding, or been jailed by the government. Extensive internal displacement of Myanmar citizens has occurred, further forcing citizens to relocate. The extraction of the country's natural resources has rapidly accelerated since the start of the civil war to finance the military. The ongoing conflict and crisis in Myanmar has further threatened the country's susceptibility to climate change.

== MAPA and Resilience ==
Over the past decade, states and communities affected by climate change have demonstrated resilience. MAPA communities have been participating in efforts to attend international conferences, join IGOs, sign climate treaties, and create emissions reduction goals. Activists from climate advocacy organizations, including Fridays for Future, have taken the stage across the globe to advocate for climate justice. With international organizations, including the United Nations and World Economic Forum, acknowledging MAPA communities, the voices of MAPA continue to grow stronger. MAPA communities are combatting climate change by:

- India: With more than 80% of its population living in areas threatened by climate change, India has taken several measures to ensure a sustainable future. With the World Bank's support, India is developing the world's largest dam rehabilitation program to control flooding and provide drinking water for its citizens.
- Standing Rock Sioux Tribe: The Standing Rock Sioux Tribe generated international attention when the U.S. Army Corps of Engineers accepted plans to place an oil pipeline through their land. Both Native Nations and non-Native allies, including politicians, supported the movement and traveled to the proposed pipeline site to protest. While the Dakota Access Pipeline was installed in 2017, the resilience of the Standing Rock Sioux Tribe empowered Natives across the United States to use their voice.
- Thailand: The primary sources of drinking water for Thai citizens come from surface and groundwater sources that have become contaminated by pollutants from human activity. To combat the water crisis within the country, Thailand has implemented a project funded by the Green Climate Fund to improve water and agriculture management. The project places an emphasis on informed planning of water management in relation to climate risks.
