= List of climate activists =

List of activists of have campaigned for climate change awareness

List of activists who have campaigned for greater awareness of climate change issues

== A ==
- Lucía Abello
- John Abraham
- Nerilie Abram
- Xiomara Acevedo
- Evelyn Acham
- Matilde Alvim
- Steven Amstrup
- Zanagee Artis
- Isabelle Axelsson
- Aliza Ayaz

== B ==
- Billy Barr
- Xiye Bastida
- Tzeporah Berman
- Jakob Blasel
- Kauthar Bouchallikht
- Gail Bradbrook
- Laurens Jan Brinkhorst
- Sian Brooke
- Nina Py Brozovich
- Angela Busheska

== C ==
- Chikondi Chabvuta
- William L. Chameides
- Adélaïde Charlier
- Quannah Chasinghorse
- Steven Chu
- Violet Coco
- Haven Coleman
- Raphaël Coleman
- Colette Pichon Battle
- Amariyanna Copeny
- Greg Craven
- Irena Creed
- Severn Cullis-Suzuki

== D ==
- Eriel Deranger
- Anuna De Wever
- Mark Diesendorf
- Michelle Dilhara
- Tom Dinwoodie
- Flossie Donnelly
- Steven Donziger
- Iris Duquesne

== E ==
- Katie Eder
- Ilyess El Kortbi
- Nisreen Elsaim

== F ==
- Christopher Field
- Christiana Figueres
- Tim Flannery
- Christopher Flavin
- Billy Fleming
- Luuk Folkerts
- Jerome Foster II

== G ==
- Rodne Galicha
- Eric Garcetti
- David Gardiner
- Amitav Ghosh
- John Gibbons
- Paul Gilding
- Holly Gillibrand
- Fina Girard
- Sherri W. Goodman
- Eban Goodstein
- Al Gore
- Lucy Gray
- Pete Gray
- Robin Grove-White
- Helena Gualinga
- Rhiana Gunn-Wright

== H ==
- Roger Hallam
- Denis Hayes
- Shaun Hendy
- Jamie Henn
- Isra Hirsi
- Paul Hudson
- Anna Hughes

== I ==
- Risto Isomäki

== J ==
- Fatou Jeng
- Kathy Jetn̄il-Kijiner

== K ==
- Licypriya Kangujam
- Salsabila Khairunnisa
- KP Khanal
- Sophia Kianni
- Phil Kingston
- Jesse Klaver
- Naomi Klein
- Vikram Kolmannskog
- Marie Christina Kolo
- Patricia Kombo

== L ==
- Melina Laboucan-Massimo
- Ollie Langridge
- Dominika Lasota
- Sharon Lavigne
- Alex Lawther
- Penelope Lea
- Zion Lights
- Mikaela Loach
- India Logan-Riley
- Catarina Lorenzo
- Dave Lowe
- Ian Lowe

== M ==
- Mary Mackey
- Arshak Makichyan
- Mazzella Maniwavie
- Michael E. Mann
- Jamie Margolin
- Arkady Martine
- Xiuhtezcatl Martinez
- Chuck McDermott
- Lynn McDonald
- Amanda McKenzie
- Bill McKibben
- Róisín McLaren
- Ayakha Melithafa
- Nathan Méténier
- Yola Mgogwana
- George Monbiot
- Nyombi Morris
- Sergio Rossetti Morosini
- Kevin Mtai
- Marianna Muntianu
- Mithika Mwenda

== N ==
- Kamrun Nahar
- Vanessa Nakate
- Leah Namugerwa
- Luisa Neubauer
- Martin Newell
- Christine Nieves
- Ed Nijpels
- Wanjuhi Njoroge
- Eric Njuguna
- Otsile Nkadimeng
- Carlos Nobre
- Nkosilathi Nyathi

== O ==
- Peggy Oki
- Adenike Oladosu
- Tamsin Omond
- Howey Ou

== P ==
- Dominique Palmer
- Ridhima Pandey
- Deborah Parker
- Rahmina Paullete
- Jadav Payeng
- Autumn Peltier
- Sofie Petersen
- Simon Pirani
- Lilly Platt
- Rafe Pomerance
- Riz Possnett
- Varshini Prakash
- Heydon Prowse

== Q ==
- Rod Quantock
- Tahir Qureshi

== R ==
- Phil Radford
- Stefan Rahmstorf
- Disha Ravi
- Patrick Reinsborough
- Bruno Rodriguez
- Pablo Solón Romero
- Joe Romm
- Aliénor Rougeot
- Ronen Rubinstein

== S ==
- Chiara Sacchi
- Hossein Sadri
- Sofía Hernández Salazar
- Leila Salazar-Lopez
- Jim Salinger
- Marshall L. Saunders
- Stanley P. Saunders
- Allan Savory
- Jigar Shah
- Peggy Shepard
- Oscar Soria
- Daniel Spencer
- Tina Stege
- Mary Ellis Stevens
- Tristram Stuart
- Swami Sundaranand
- David Suzuki
- Shajaan Muaz Shaheem

== T ==
- Mitzi Jonelle Tan
- Aigagalefili Fepulea'i Tapua'i
- Jerry Taylor
- Morten Thorsby
- Greta Thunberg
- Mónica Feria Tinta
- Tori Tsui
- Bert Tucker

== U ==
- Marinel Sumook Ubaldo

== V ==
- Diwigdi Valiente
- Alexandria Villaseñor

== W ==
- Christopher O. Ward
- Elizabeth Wathuti
- Cédric Wermuth
- Jalonne White-Newsome
- Luke Wijohn
- Melati and Isabel Wijsen
- Katharine Wilkinson
- Pieter Winsemius

== Y ==
- Farhana Yamin
- Paul Yeboah
- Ruth Yeoh
- Allan Yeomans
