= Sofía Hernández Salazar =

Costa Rica human rights and environmental activist

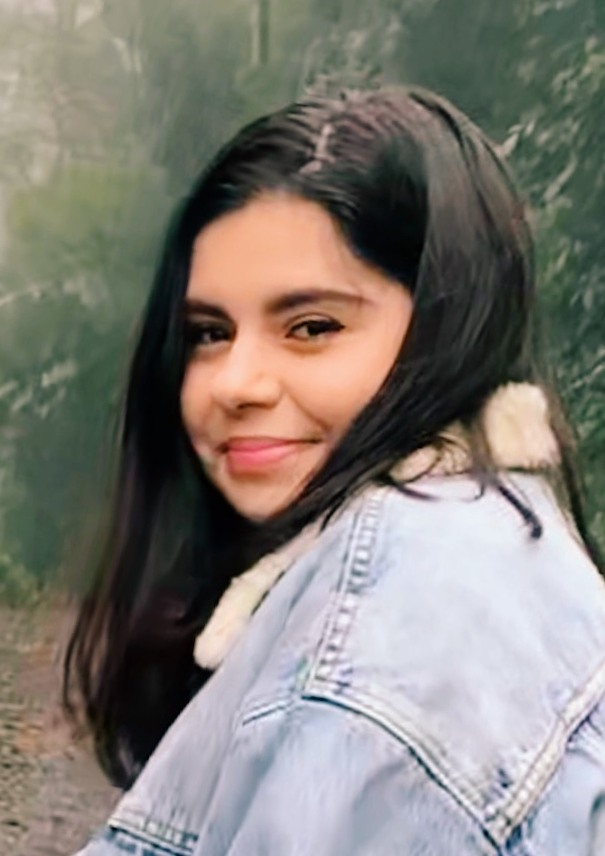
- Born: August 26, 1998 (age 27); San José, Costa Rica
- Known for: Political Science Student; Human Rights and Climate Activist

Sofia Hernandez Salazar (born August 26, 1998) is a Costa Rican human rights, and environmental activist.

== Life ==
Sofía is a political science student at the University of Costa Rica. She is an organizer for Fridays For Future Costa Rica, coordinator of Escazú Ahora Costa Rica and Young Leaders Costa Rica and co-founded Latinas For Climate. She attended the 2019 United Nations Climate Change Conference as part of the Costa Rican delegation.

She joined Fridays For Future Costa Rica in mid-2019. In one of her first strikes in front of the Presidential House she was part of a conversation with the President of the Republic, Carlos Alvarado, and other activists about the importance of declaring a climate emergency and of giving real protagonism to youth in climate and environmental decision-making spaces. Subsequently, Sofia has again engaged in talks with the Costa Rican Presidency, specifically with the Vice President, Epsy Campbell, where she urged on the importance of ratifying the Escazú Agreement and with the Vice Minister of Political Affairs and Citizen Dialogue on the importance of withdrawing the trawling law.

Since September 2020 she is one of the coordinators of Escazú Now, an initiative conformed by Fridays For Future Costa Rica, Greenwolf Costa Rica and the Youth and Climate Change Network that aims to promote the ratification and proper implementation of the Escazú Agreement in the country.

In December 2020, Hernández was part of a global group of 9 women and non-binary activists that published a letter to global leaders on Thomson Reuters Foundation News, entitled "As the Paris Agreement on Climate Change marks five years, urgent action on climate threats is needed now". The international group included Mitzi Jonelle Tan, Belyndar Rikimani, Leonie Bremer, Laura Muñoz, Fatou Jeng, Disha Ravi, Hilda Flavia Nakabuye and Saoi O'Connor. She helped organize the Mock COP26 and was a Costa Rican delegate.
