= Saoi O'Connor =

Irish climate activist

- Born: Skibbereen, County Cork, Ireland
- Occupations: Climate activist, writer
- Years active: 2019-present
- Organization: Fridays for Future
- Known for: Climate activism, climate justice

Saoi O'Connor is an Irish youth climate activist who began the Fridays for Future strike in Cork, Ireland in January 2019.

== Personal life ==
O'Connor was born in Skibbereen, County Cork, but currently resides in Glasgow where they are studying History and Politics at the University of Glasgow. They are autistic, transgender and non-binary, and use gender neutral they/them pronouns. They have an orange cat named Pumpkin.

== Climate justice activism ==
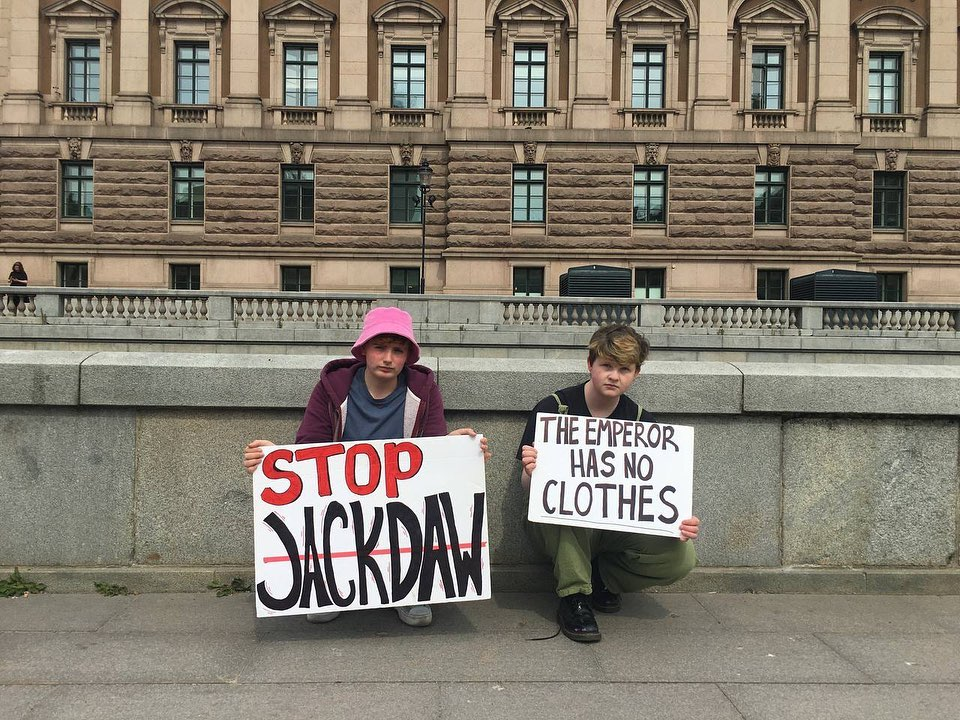
O'Connor (right) attending a weekly climate strike in Stockholm, June 2022, with fellow Scotland-based activist Dylan Hamilton.

Saoi O'Connor began the Fridays For Future strike in Cork City on 11 January 2019 outside Cork City Hall holding a poster which says "The Emperor Has No Clothes". O'Connor started their activism at aged three as part of a fair trade campaign during St Patrick's Day.

In order to work on climate justice activism full-time, O'Connor moved away from mainstream education at Skibbereen Community School to continue their studies home-schooling. In September 2021 they left formal second-level education, and never sat their Leaving Certificate, though they later progressed to Third Level Education at the University of Glasgow.

In February 2019, O'Connor travelled to the European Parliament in Strasbourg to join fellow activists for the climate debates. Between 2019 and 2020 O'Connor was followed by a documentary crew, as one of three subjects of the documentary "Growing Up At The End of The World" which aired on RTÉ in November 2021.

O'Connor was one of the 157 delegates to the 2019 RTÉ Youth Assembly on Climate, and one of two Irish delegates to the 2021 pre-COP youth conference in Milan, organised by the Italian Government, where they and others publicly criticised the event for "youthwashing", staging a protest inside the conference for which they were detained by Italian police and had their passports taken.

Due to the COVID-19 pandemic, the in-person school strikes were suspended in early 2020, but O'Connor recommenced them in July 2020.

In December 2020 O'Connor was part of a global group of 9 women and non-binary activists that published a letter to global leaders on Thomson Reuters Foundation News, entitled "As the Paris Agreement on Climate Change marks five years, urgent action on climate threats is needed now". The international group included Mitzi Jonelle Tan, Belyndar Rikimani, Leonie Bremer, Laura Muñoz, Fatou Jeng, Disha Ravi, Hilda Flavia Nakabuye and Sofía Hernández Salazar.

For Earth Day 2021, O'Connor was one of the organisers for Fridays For Future Ireland's virtual event, which called on the Minister for Climate Action Eamon Ryan to take more and immediate action on climate change.

O'Connor attended their first UN conference, COP25, at 17, and was engaged in grassroots activism during COP26 in Glasgow in 2021. They stated that "None of these conferences can give us what we’re fighting for, only the people can do that.". For Earth Day 2021, O'Connor was one of the organisers for Fridays For Future Ireland's virtual event, which called on the Minister for Climate Action Eamon Ryan to take more and immediate action on climate change.

O'Connor attended COP27 in Sharm El Sheikh, Egypt, as well as SB58 in Bonn, Germany and COP28 in Dubai, United Arab Emirates where they addressed the Plenary on behalf of the Youth Constituency. They are the current Global North Coordinator for the Alliance of Non-Governmental Radical Youth as well as being one of two Youth Coordinators for the Fossil Fuel Non-Proliferation Treaty.

=== Writing ===
O'Connor wrote an article for The Irish Times in January 2021 reflecting on the difficulties of preparing for the Leaving Certificate examinations during the pandemic.

O'Connor was one of the contributors to an anthology, Empty House (2021), co-edited by Alice Kinsella and Nessa O'Mahony and included contributions from Rick O'Shea and Paula Meehan.

== Awards and recognitions ==
In December 2019, O'Connor was awarded the Outstanding Individual at the Cork Environmental Forum's Awards ceremony. During the ceremony, they remarked on how little had changed regarding climate change policy since they began their climate strike. The Fridays For Future Cork group, of which O'Connor was a member, also received a commendation from the Forum.

In November 2021 O'Connor received the Young Humanitarian of the Year award from the Irish Red Cross.

O'Connor has been featured in several children's books including Be Inspired! Irish Young People Changing the World (2022) and Girl Warriors: How 25 Young Activists Are Saving the Earth (2021) although O'Connor does not identify as a girl.
