= Fatou Jeng =

Gambian climate activist

- Born: Banjul, The Gambia
- Education: University of the Gambia; University of Sussex
- Occupation: Activist
- Known for: Climate activism, women's rights activism
- Awards: Forbes 30 under 30 Africa

Fatou Jeng is a Gambian youth climate activist. She was named among the 30 most influential young Gambians of 2019, and in 2025 featured on the list of Forbes Africa 30 Under 30 as a young leader shaping Africa's future.

== Early life and education life ==
Fatou Jeng was born in Banjul in The Gambia.

She studied at the University of the Gambia, and was the first female president of the university's student union. Jeng also graduated from the University of Sussex, where she obtained a master's degree in environment, development, and policy, and was a recipient of the Chevening scholarship.

== Activism ==
Jeng has been advocating for action on climate change from a young age.

She founded the youth lead and non-profit organization Clean Earth Gambia. The goal of the organization is to create awareness about issues concerning the environment, most importantly climate change. Her organization in partnership with UNICEF Gambia and the Government of the Gambia organized the first national children and youth conference on climate change producing a national climate engagement strategy. They work to teach and train more than 500 school children about climate change, plant over 30,000 trees, as well as address other environmental issues to local communities.

In 2019, Jeng was one of thirty people selected for the first ever UNFCC YOUNGO, the youth delegation to the Climate Negotiations. At the United Nations convention she was a driving force for policy submission on gender and climate change as well as the policy operation lead for Women and Gender. Also in 2019, she helped facilitate youth engagement during Africa Climate week.

She was the QTV Youth Dialogue Gambian Youth of the Month in June 2019 for her climate change advocacy, and described by Whatson Gambia as one of the 30 most influential young Gambians. The UN Country Office in her home country, the Gambia described her as a "trailblazing youth climate activist and a driving force for policy submissions on gender and climate change"

"Women play fundamental roles in local food systems and are carers and activists, which make them uniquely placed to drive longer term climate resilience." Fatou's advocacy for gender inclusion in climate action was pivotal to UK £165 million funding to advance gender equality in climate action, which COP27's President Alok Sharma announced in November 2021.

In December 2020, Jeng was part of a global group of nine women and non-binary activists who published a letter to world leaders on Thomson Reuters Foundation News, entitled "As the Paris Agreement on Climate Change marks five years, urgent action on climate threats is needed now". The international group also included Mitzi Jonelle Tan (Philippines), Belyndar Rikimani (Solomon Islands), Leonie Bremer (Germany), Laura Veronica Muñoz (Colombia), Saoi O'Connor (Ireland), Disha Ravi (India), Hilda Flavia Nakabuye (Uganda) and Sofía Hernández Salazar (Costa Rica).

In 2021, She was recognized as one of the "Top 100 Young African Conservation Leaders" by the African Alliance of YMCAs, the African Wildlife Fund, and a collection of other international non-profit organizations. She was also appointed a member of the Soft Power Bowl Club founded by former Deputy Prime Minister of Italy and has been featured in interviews by the UNFCCC, BBC, and DW.

In March 2023, the United Nations' Secretary-General appointed as one of the seven members of the second cohort of the Youth Advisory Group on Climate Change, a body established to provide youth perspectives and recommendations on the implementation of the Secretary-General's climate agenda. She also served as the youth representative on the advisory panel of the United Nations' Early Warnings for All initiative.

In 2023, Jeng participated as a panelist at the Athens Democracy Forum in Athens, Greece.

In 2025, Forbes named Fatou as one of 8 African Environmentalists to watch in 2026, while applauding her contributions to climate negotiations and policy discussions at the United Nations. Similarly, the World Economic Forum paid tribute to her achievements. It noted, "She is internationally recognized as an organizer of youth climate action in the country, including hosting the first National Children and Youth Conference on Climate Change. Her organization has planted over 35,000 trees across The Gambia including planting over 14,000 coconut trees across Banjul beach with Future Proof under Banjul City Council to curb rising sea-level in Banjul."

Fatou has been recognised for her advocacy on climate justice from an African perspective and has spoken at international conferences and events on the subject. She serves as chairperson of the advisory board of the Africa Youth Climate Fund, an initiative focused on improving young Africans' access to climate finance. She has also written or contributed opinion pieces published by Time, Bond , Independent, among others.

== Recognition and awards ==
- 2019: QTV Gambian Youth Dialogue Award
- 2023: Women Championing Environmental Rights Award
- 2024: Youngster Award by the Greentech Festival
- 2025: Forbes 30 under 30 Africa
- 2025: New Africa Magazine's 100 Most Influential Africans 2025 and 100 young and exceptional Africans.

== See also ==
- Climate change in the Gambia
