= Ridhima Pandey =

Indian climate activist (born 2007)

- रिधिमा पाण्डे
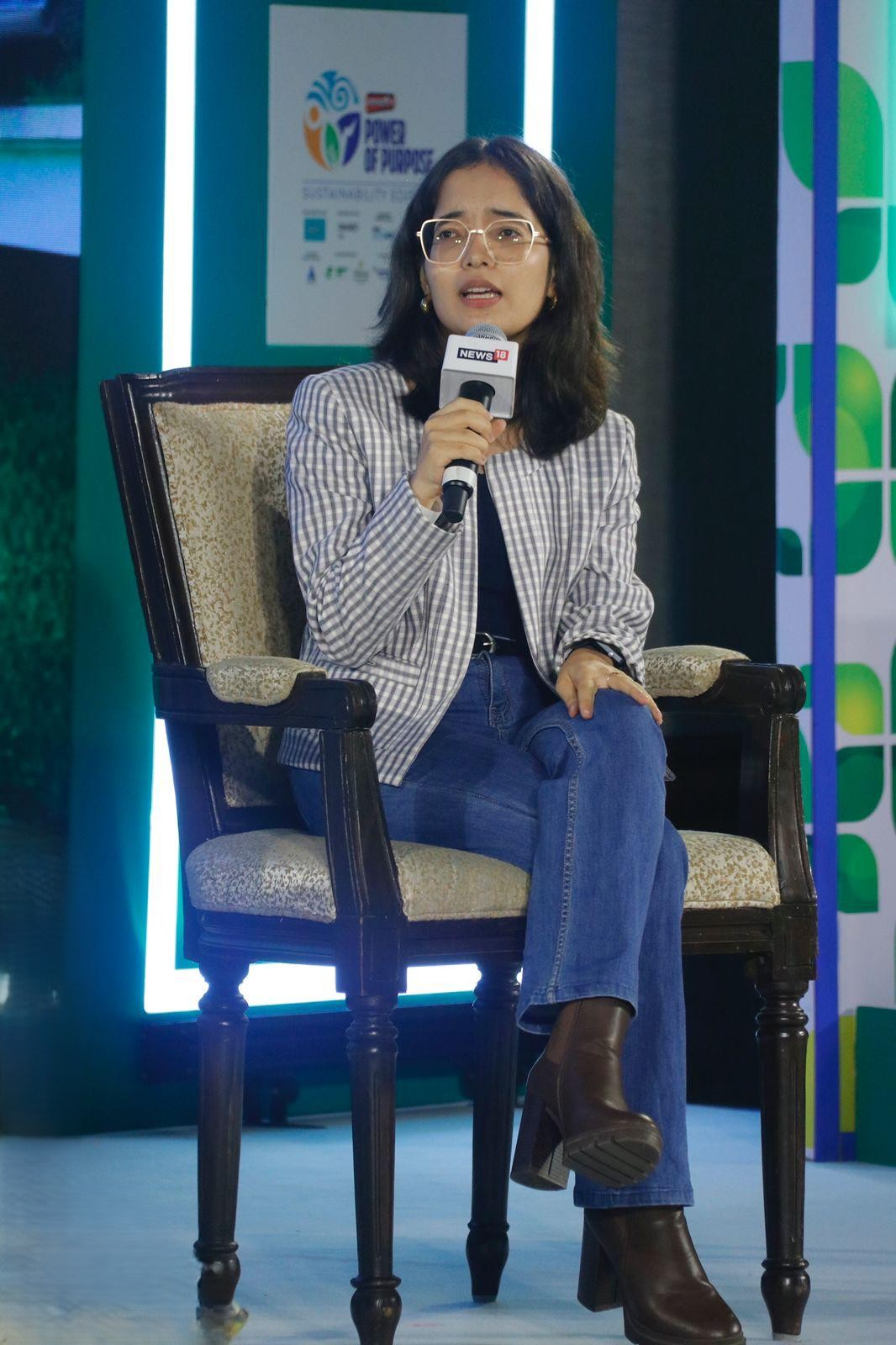
- Born: 2007 (age 18–19); Haripur Bachi Village, Uttarakhand, India
- Occupation: Environmental activist
- Years active: 2017–present
- Awards: Mother Teresa Memorial Award for Social Justice; BBC 100 Women of 2020; Nickelodeon Kids Choice Award
- Website: https://ridhimapandey.in/

Signature
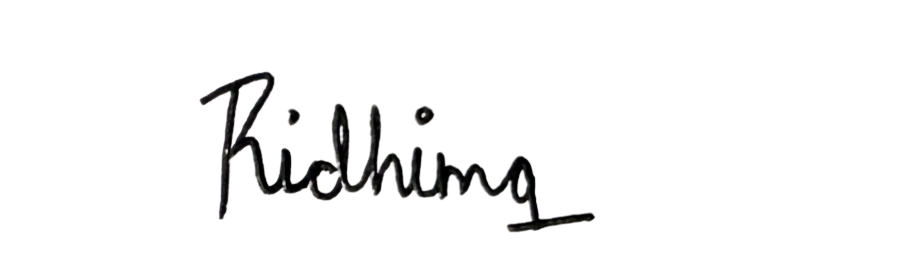

Ridhima Pandey (born in October 2007) is an Indian environmental activist who advocates for action against climate change. She has been likened to Greta Thunberg. When she was nine years old, she filed a suit against the Indian government for not taking enough steps to combat climate change. She also was one of the complainants to the United Nations, along with several other young climate activists, against several nations' failure to take action against the climate crisis.

== Background ==
Pandey lives in Haridwar, Uttarakhand, a state in the North of India. She is daughter of Dinesh Chandra Pandey who works in Wildlife Trust India who is an environmentalist and has worked in Uttarakhand in this capacity for 16 years and her mother is Vinita Pandey who works for Forest Department for Uttarakhand.

Her interest in climate change started when Pandey's home of Uttarakhand had been affected by severe weather over the past three years and in 2013, over 1000 people died in cause of floods and landslides. Almost 100,000 people had to be evacuated from the region. According to World Bank, climate change is likely to increase pressure on the water supply in India.

She has stated that her activism was motivated by seeing the impact of the 2013 Uttarakhand floods.

== Activism ==
=== Legal action against the Indian government ===
At age nine, Pandey filed a lawsuit against the Indian Government on the basis that they had not taken the significant steps against climate change that they had agreed to in the Paris Agreement. This court case was presented in the National Green Tribunal (NGT), a court which was established in 2010 that deals solely with environmental cases. The petition argued that the Public Trust Doctrine, India's commitments under the Paris Agreement, and existing Environmental laws obligated stronger measures to mitigate climate change. Although the petition was ultimately dismissed, it brought significant attention to the climate crisis in India.

Pandey also asked the Government to prepare a plan to reduce carbon emissions and a nationwide plan to curb the impact of climate change, including reducing India's use of fossil fuels. In an interview with The Independent. Pandey states:

My Government has failed to take steps to regulate and reduce greenhouse gas emissions, which are causing extreme climate conditions. This will impact both me and future generations. My country has huge potential to reduce the use of fossil fuels, and because of the Government's inaction I approached the National Green Tribunal.

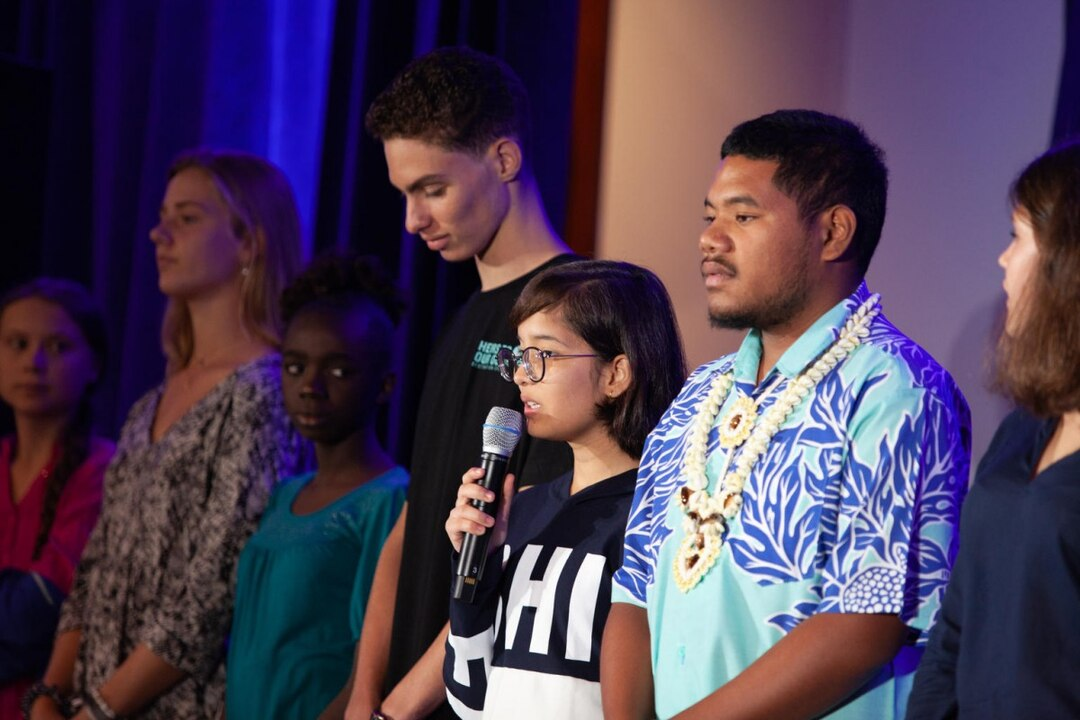
Ridhima Pandey, 11, from Haridwar, India, speaks at a press conference at the UN Climate Action Summit among 16 youngsters who field an official complaint against their governments for inaction against climate change.

=== Complaint to the United Nations ===
Ridhima Pandey was selected to go to New York for the 2019 United Nations Climate Action summit. On September 23, 2019, she was one of 16 child activists, including Greta Thunberg, Catarina Lorenzo, Chiara Sacchi and Iris Duquesne, who filed a complaint with the United Nations Committee on the Rights of the Child against Argentina, Brazil, France, Germany, and Turkey. The complaint alleged these countries violated child rights by failing to address the climate crisis adequately, under the Third Optional Protocol to the Convention on the Rights of the Child, a voluntary mechanism allowing children to appeal for rights violations. The group argued that these nations' inadequate climate policies infringed on their rights to life, health, and culture by exacerbating global warming.

The legal action was supported by the law firm Hausfeld and Earthjustice. The committee acknowledged the complaint in October 2021, but ruled it inadmissible due to jurisdictional limits.

=== Dehradun climate strike ===
In September 2019, Pandey led a climate strike in Dehradun, Uttarakhand, as part of the global Fridays for Future. The strike took place on September 20, aligning with the Global Week for Future, a series of protests from September 20–27 that preceded the UN Climate Action Summit on September 23 in New York. Pandey led hundreds of youth to protest and demand urgent climate action from the Indian government, focusing on issues like rising temperatures, deforestation, and extreme weather events. The event saw participants marching through the city, holding placards with messages like "There is no Planet B" and "Act Now," echoing the global call for systemic change. Reports indicate that nearly 27 cities across India participated in the strikes that week.

=== Xyenteo Exchange Norway ===
In September 2019, Ridhima Pandey, then 11 years old, spoke at the Xynteo Exchange in Oslo, Norway, alongside Norwegian Sámi artist and climate activist Ella Marie Hætta Isaksen and former Norwegian Minister of Petroleum and Energy Thorhild Widvey. The event, held on October 9–10 at Skur 13, an old warehouse on Oslo's docks, convened over 500 mission-driven leaders from business, academia, arts, and activism to rethink growth models amid climate and social challenges, as part of Xynteo's platform launched in 2017 to foster collaborative solutions. Pandey's session, part of the "Square" forum—a central stage for challenging beliefs and inspiring action—focused on activism in the social media age and generational divides, with her urging older generations to act decisively rather than leave youth to bear the burden and passionately declaring:

People know what the issue is: climate change. And it's being ignored. Why do kids have to suffer for others' ignorance? This makes me very angry.

She shared her experiences from Uttarakhand, highlighting floods and forest fires as evidence of climate urgency, while Isaksen addressed indigenous perspectives and Widvey offered policy insights, creating a dynamic intergenerational dialogue. The Xynteo Exchange 2019, themed around accelerating action on people and planet challenges, featured additional speakers like futurist Monica Bielskyte and former Norwegian PM Erna Solberg, and included "Studios" for co-creating solutions and a "Marketplace" showcasing 50 entrepreneurial projects, such as waste management innovations. Pandey's participation—her first major international speaking engagement—elevated her global profile, with media noting her alongside Thunberg as a youth voice pushing for accountability.

=== Appeal to save Aarey Forest ===
In 2019, Ridhima Pandey, then 11, issued a public appeal to Prime Minister Narendra Modi to halt the felling of over 2,600 trees in Mumbai's Aarey Forest, a vital green lung spanning 1,287 hectares adjacent to Sanjay Gandhi National Park, for a metro car shed project under Mumbai Metro Rail Corporation Limited (MMRCL) for Metro Line 3. Her appeal, delivered via a widely circulated video statement on September 3, 2019, urged Modi to "stop the cutting of Aarey forests and release those protesting," aligning with a broader citizens' movement that included environmentalists, students, and local Adivasi communities who depend on the forest for their livelihood. Pandey's action came amid escalating protests following the Bombay High Court's October 4 dismissal of petitions to declare Aarey a forest or stop the tree-cutting, prompting MMRCL to begin felling trees that night, with over 2,141 cut by October 5, 2019, before the Supreme Court intervened on October 7, ordering a status quo after a law student's letter-turned-PIL, halting further cuts and releasing 29 detained activists. Her appeal gained traction as part of the #SaveAareyForest campaign, which saw support from figures like Aaditya Thackeray and international attention via social media, highlighting urban deforestation tensions. Though the metro project proceeded, with compensatory afforestation of 20,000 trees already planted and 13,000 more planned by 2023.

=== Letter to Prime Minister Modi on air pollution ===
On September 7, 2020, the first International Day of Clean Air for Blue Skies, Ridhima Pandey wrote an open letter to Prime Minister Narendra Modi, calling for urgent action against air pollution in cities like Delhi, Mumbai, and Chennai, where air quality often reaches hazardous levels. She highlighted the health risks to children and the elderly, stating in the letter:

I worry if a 12-year-old like me finds it hard to breathe, what it must be like for babies.

The letter was part of her broader advocacy for environmental health, she urged the government to enforce stricter air quality standards and shift to renewable energy sources to combat the crisis. Pandey's appeal coincided with growing public concern over Delhi's toxic air, which the Lancet Planetary Health reported in 2020 caused 1.67 million deaths annually in India due to PM2.5 exposure, a statistic she referenced to underscore the urgency. In a January 2025 interview, she reflected on this effort, saying, "I wrote to the PM because clean air isn't just a wish—it's a right we're losing every day," emphasizing her ongoing commitment.

=== Further activism ===
In September 2019, Pandey led a climate strike under the FridaysForFuture in Dehradun and also became a speaker for Xynteo Exchange at the same month in Norway with Ella Marie Hætta Isaksen. Pandey came back dealing with Indian government when she make an appeal to Narendra Modi to stop a plan to chop Aarey forest to build a metro car shed project

Pandey has called for a complete ban on plastic, arguing that its continued production is the result of consumer demand. She has also called for the Indian government and local authorities to do more to clean the Ganga River. She said that while the government claims that it is cleaning the river, there hasn't been much change in the condition of the river.

Pandey is quoted on her biography on Children vs Climate Change as stating her aim:

I want to save our future. I want to save the future of all the children and all people of future generations.

=== SaalBhar60 campaign launch ===
On World Environment Day, June 5, 2020, Ridhima Pandey, then 12 years old, launched the SaalBhar60 campaign, a pan-India digital initiative demanding clean air with PM 2.5 levels at 60 micrograms per cubic meter, the maximum safe limit set by India's Central Pollution Control Board (CPCB), amid improved air quality during the COVID-19 lockdown. Inspired by Delhi's severe air pollution—where the Air Quality Index (AQI) often exceeded 300, classified as "hazardous" and the lockdown's temporary relief, with AQI dropping to 150 in some areas, Pandey aimed to ensure sustained clean air post-lockdown, rallying support with the slogan "Clean air is our right!" The campaign, launched virtually due to pandemic restrictions, involved over 50 celebrities, activists, and citizens, including actor Dia Mirza and singer Shaan, who held placards reading "SaalBhar60" and shared photos on social media, tagging government agencies like the Ministry of Environment, Forest and Climate Change to pressure for policy action. Pandey's initiative gained traction online, with #SaalBhar60 trending briefly on Twitter, amplifying calls for stricter emission controls and renewable energy adoption.

=== UN Secretary-General petition ===
In 2021, Ridhima Pandey joined 13 other young climate activists from around the world including Greta Thunberg, in submitting a petition to United Nations Secretary-General António Guterres, urging him to declare the climate crisis a global level 3 emergency—the highest classification under the UN's emergency response framework. This petition, presented during a period of heightened global attention on climate change ahead of COP26 in Glasgow, emphasized the urgent need for systemic, coordinated international action to address escalating climate impacts, particularly on vulnerable populations such as children in developing nations like India.

Pandey, then 13, highlighted the disproportionate burden faced by youth, stating in an interview:

We are the ones who will inherit this planet, yet we have no say in how it's being destroyed. It's unfair that our future is slipping away because of decisions made by those who won't live to see the consequences, and we're left fighting for a world that should already be ours to protect.

The petition called for immediate resource mobilization, enhanced climate finance for adaptation, and recognition of the crisis as a threat to human rights, drawing on the UN's own frameworks like the Sustainable Development Goals (SDGs). While the UN did not formally adopt the level 3 designation, the action garnered significant media coverage and reinforced Pandey's role as a leading voice in global youth advocacy. The effort built on her prior international engagements, such as the 2019 UN complaint, and underscored her commitment to pushing world leaders beyond symbolic gestures toward tangible policy shifts.

=== Federation of Asian Bishops' Conference ===
In October 2022, Ridhima Pandey, then 15 years old, delivered a speech at the 50th General Conference of the Federation of Asian Bishops' Conferences (FABC), held from October 12–30 at the Baan Phu Waan Pastoral Centre in Bangkok, Thailand, marking the FABC's golden jubilee since its founding in 1970. Pandey, invited as a youth climate advocate, addressed the assembly on October 18 during a session focused on ecological justice, sharing her experiences of climate-induced disasters in Uttarakhand, such as the 2013 floods and recurring forest fires, and criticizing older generations for inaction, stating:

I do not want my generation to suffer because adults failed to act when they had the chance.

=== Cartoon Network's Redraw Your World ===
In 2022, Ridhima Pandey participated in "Cartoon Network's Redraw Your World," an environmental awareness campaign launched by Cartoon Network India in April 2022 to inspire children to address climate issues through art and storytelling. As a featured advocate, she narrated her climate journey in a short segment, encouraging young viewers to take action, aligning with the campaign’s “Redrawing India” initiative.

== Media appearances ==
=== Generation Greta (2020) ===
Ridhima Pandey was featured in Generation Greta, a 2020 documentary directed by Johan Boulanger, released on March 8, 2020, by Java Films, exploring the lives of nine young female climate activists.

=== The Letter: A Message for Our Earth (2022) ===
In 2022, Ridhima Pandey, then 15, was featured in The Letter: A Message for Our Earth, a documentary produced by Oscar-winning Off the Fence Productions, directed by Nicolas Brown, and co-produced with the Laudato Si' Movement and the Vatican, released as a YouTube Original on October 4, 2022. The film, inspired by Pope Francis's 2015 encyclical Laudato Si', follows Pandey and four other environmental leaders—representing youth, the poor, Indigenous peoples, and wildlife—from India, Senegal, Brazil, and Hawaii, as they travel to Rome for a dialogue with Pope Francis about the climate crisis. Pandey, representing the voice of youth, shared her experiences of climate impacts in Uttarakhand, including floods and forest fires, emphasizing the urgency of intergenerational action in a meeting filmed at the Vatican. Premiering in Vatican City’s Synod Hall, it won the Golden Dolphin Award for Environment, Ecology & Sustainability at the 2023 Cannes Corporate Media & TV Awards and garnered over 7 million views in its first two weeks, boosted by endorsements from Leonardo DiCaprio and Arnold Schwarzenegger. Screened at World Youth Day 2023 in Lisbon to an estimated 1.5 million attendees.

=== One for Change season 3 (2023) ===
In 2023, Ridhima Pandey was featured in One for Change season 3, a short-film series by National Geographic India and Disney Star, as part of an Earth Day initiative highlighting young environmental changemakers. The series, which aired across National Geographic and Disney Star entertainment channels, showcased Pandey's advocacy for climate justice, including her 2017 lawsuit against the Indian government and her role in global youth-led climate movements such as the 2019 UN complaint against nations failing to address the climate crisis. The campaign aimed to inspire viewers to adopt sustainable practices, with Pandey emphasizing the urgency of holding leaders accountable:

These decisions involve my future, so I must have a say.

== Recognition ==
Pandey was on the list of the BBC's 100 Women announced on 23 November 2020. She also received a Mother Teresa Memorial Award for Social Justice on 16 December 2021 in New Delhi.

== See also ==
- Environmental movement
- Greta Thunberg
