= Lucía Abello =

Chilean librarian and naturalist

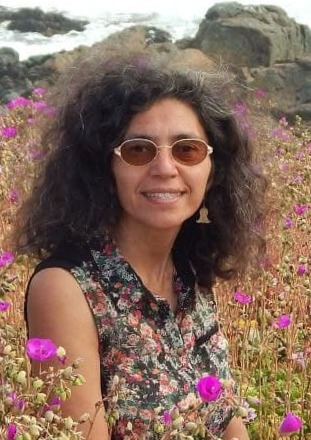
- Lucía Abello, in 2021
- Born: Chile
- Occupation(s): Librarian. Regional Coordination of Public Libraries of Los Ríos, dependent on the National Service of Cultural Heritage
- Awards: College of Librarians of Chile (2012)

Lucía Abello is a Chilean librarian, naturalist and botanist. She has been in charge of exploring, researching, documenting and disseminating the native flora in her region and in her country, as well as its traditional uses through photography and bibliographic publications. She has also been in charge of promoting reading from the public library with a respect for the environment approach.

== Libraries and environment ==
Lucía Abello is the Coordinator of the Los Rios Regional Public Library system. Before this position she was the Director of the Doñihue Municipal Public Library and the San Vicente Agricultural School Library.

Abello has pioneered a unique role within libraries that combines environmental conservation and information science. This is of particular importance in Chile and other parts of Latin America where education about biodiversity and the climate is transferred to learners through the act of reading. As library director at the Municipal Public Library in Doñihue, she created partnerships and educational programs between the library and Parque Safari. She has given several interviews and her work has been recognized by UNESCO's Regional Center for the promotion of books in Latin America and the Caribbean. In 2012 she was chosen as the Outstanding Librarian of the Year, the highest honor bestowed by the Chilean National Library Association (Colegio de Bibliotecarios de Chile).

== Awards and distinctions ==
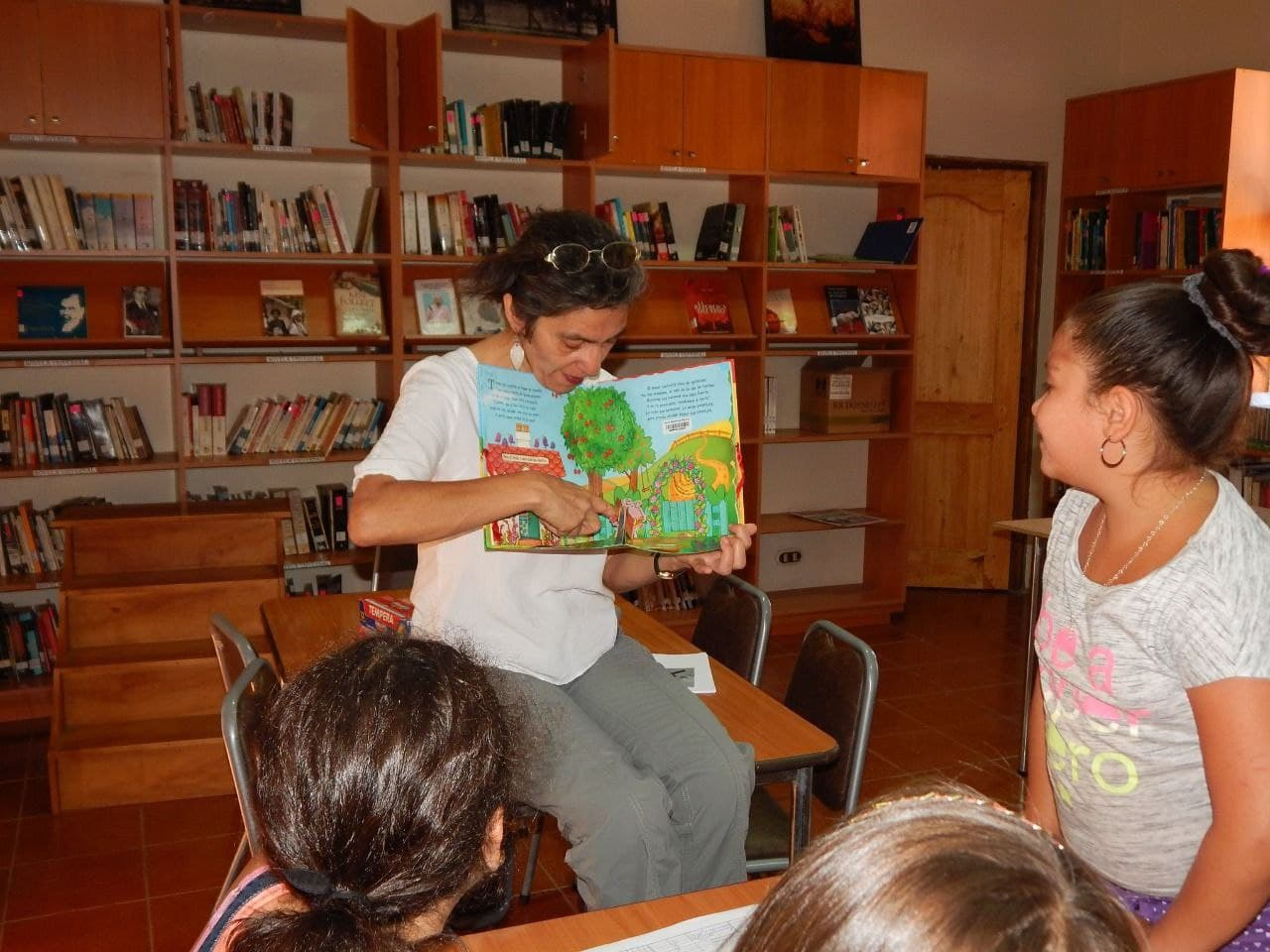
Lucía Abello conducting reading workshops at the public library

- Merit Award. Illustrious Municipality of Doñihue for her outstanding professional work (1995).
- Learning Resource Center of the Claudio Arrau León de Doñihue High School: For her constant support to the students in their work as a librarian (2003).
- Scholarship for an internship at the Germán Sánchez Ruipérez Foundation, Salamanca, Spain granted by the Book Fund of the National Council of Culture and the Arts (2004).
- The Regional Council for Culture and the Arts pays tribute to the members of the Regional Directory, fundamental pillars of the new cultural institutionality (2007).
- Outstanding Librarian Award by the College of Librarians of Chile, 2012
- San Vicente de Paul Agricultural School, Quimávida, Coltauco: For her valuable contribution to the education of our students (2013).
- Illustrious Municipality of Doñihue in Appreciation for her 20 years of work in the education of the commune (2014).
- College of Librarians of Peru. Incorporation as an Honorary Member (2014).
- Selected to integrate the International Training Program Network of Emerging Library Innovators (INELI- Iberoamérica), which was implemented in 10 Latin American countries by CERLALC, in association with the Germán Sánchez Ruipérez Foundation and the Bill and Melinda Gates Foundation.
- Selected by the College of Librarians of Chile to be a trainer for the International Advocacy Program (IAP - IFLA LAC - ODS and Agenda 2030 (2016).
- FILSA Award 2022 for promoting the readership

== Publications ==
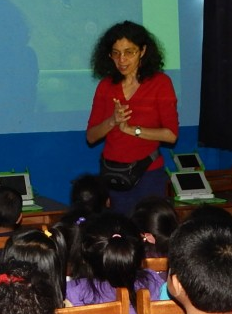
Lucía in a workshop in Lima (Peru)

- Cordero, Sebastián, Gálvez, Francisca; Abello, Lucía. (2021). Traditional uses of Chilean flora Volume I: Natives. Valparaíso: Planeta de Papel.
- Abello, Lucía. La biblioteca y su relación con el conocimiento. Panel. VII Congreso Nacional de Bibliotecas Públicas. Biblioteca Nacional de Colombia, 30 de noviembre al 7 de diciembre de 2020.
- Abello, Lucía; Reyes, Josefina; Cuevas, Claudia; Fuentes, María Angélica. Libraries, Sustainable Development Goals (SDG) and UN 2030 Agenda: Brief Selection of Good Library Practices in Chile (2019) / IFLA Commission College of Librarians of Chile.
- Abello, Lucía; Paz Juárez, Victor Hugo; Ruiz Pérez, Rafael; Veiga Vila, Isabel Inés (2018). "Espacios para la creación. Modelos para generar espacios de creación en tu biblioteca" (PDF). CERLALC. Centro Regional para el Fomento del Libro en América Latina y el Caribe.
- Abello, Lucía (2017). Ecoguides training course in the commune of Doñihue: Exploring other forms of readings that contribute to the SDGs of Agenda 2030, from the Municipal Public Library of Doñihue, Chile. Paper presented at: IFLA WLIC 2017 – Wrocław, Poland – Libraries. Solidarity. Society. in Session 139 - Division V - Regions.
- Abello, Lucía and Reyes Muñoz, Josefina (2017) Map of the partial situation of libraries in Chile and how they contribute to the 2030 agenda through Good Library Practices (BPB). Paper presented at: IFLA WLIC 2017 – Wrocław, Poland – Libraries. Solidarity. Society. in Session 161 - Latin America and the Caribbean.
- Cordero, Sebastián; Abello, Lucía; Gálvez, Francisca. Edible and medicinal wild plants of Chile and other parts of the world (2017).
- Abello, Lucía; Macaya, Jorge. 2013. Hallazgo de Adesmia pirionii I.M. Johnst. (Fabaceae) en Alhué, cajón del Pichi, cordillera de la Costa, Alhué, Región Metropolitana, Chile. Chloris Chilensis Año 16 N°1.
- Abello, Lucía (2011) Environmental Education from the Public Library: an imperative need. 109 — Sustainable innovation and green information for all — Environmental Sustainability and Libraries Special Interest Group. Paper presented at: IFLA WLIC 2011
- Abello, Lucía and Ricci, Marcia Joyas de Doñihue and the Roblería del Cobre de Loncha National Reserve.
- Marticorena, Alicia; Alarcón, Diego; Abello, Abello; Atala, Cristian . Plantas Trepadoras, Epífitas y Parásitas Nativas de Chile. Guía de campo. (2010). Concepción, Corma.
- Abello, Lucía. The Public Library: between reading promotion and Digital Literacy. Experiences of the Municipal Public Library of Doñihue. 2nd. Iberoamerican Congress of Librarianship: "Libraries and new readings in the digital space". Buenos Aires, April 14–17, 2007.
- Abello, Lucía. The role of libraries and information professionals in relation to cultural consumption: A brief reflection. Biblios, 2006, n. 24
- Abello, Lucía. The public library: an agent of socio-cultural inclusion. The experience of the Municipal Public Library of Doñihue., 2006 . In 1er Congreso Nacional de Bibliotecas Públicas, Santiago (Chile), 8-10 Nov 2006.
