= Mihir Sharma =

Indian economist

Mihir Swarup Sharma is an Indian economist who is senior fellow at the Observer Research Foundation and an opinion columnist for Bloomberg News. Before that he was the opinion editor for Business Standard and a columnist for the Indian Express.

In 2015, Sharma wrote a book called Restart: The Last Chance for the Indian Economy.

== Bibliography ==
- Sharma, Mihir (2015). Restart:The last chance for the Indian Economy. Random House.
