= Aliénor Rougeot =

Canadian climate change activist

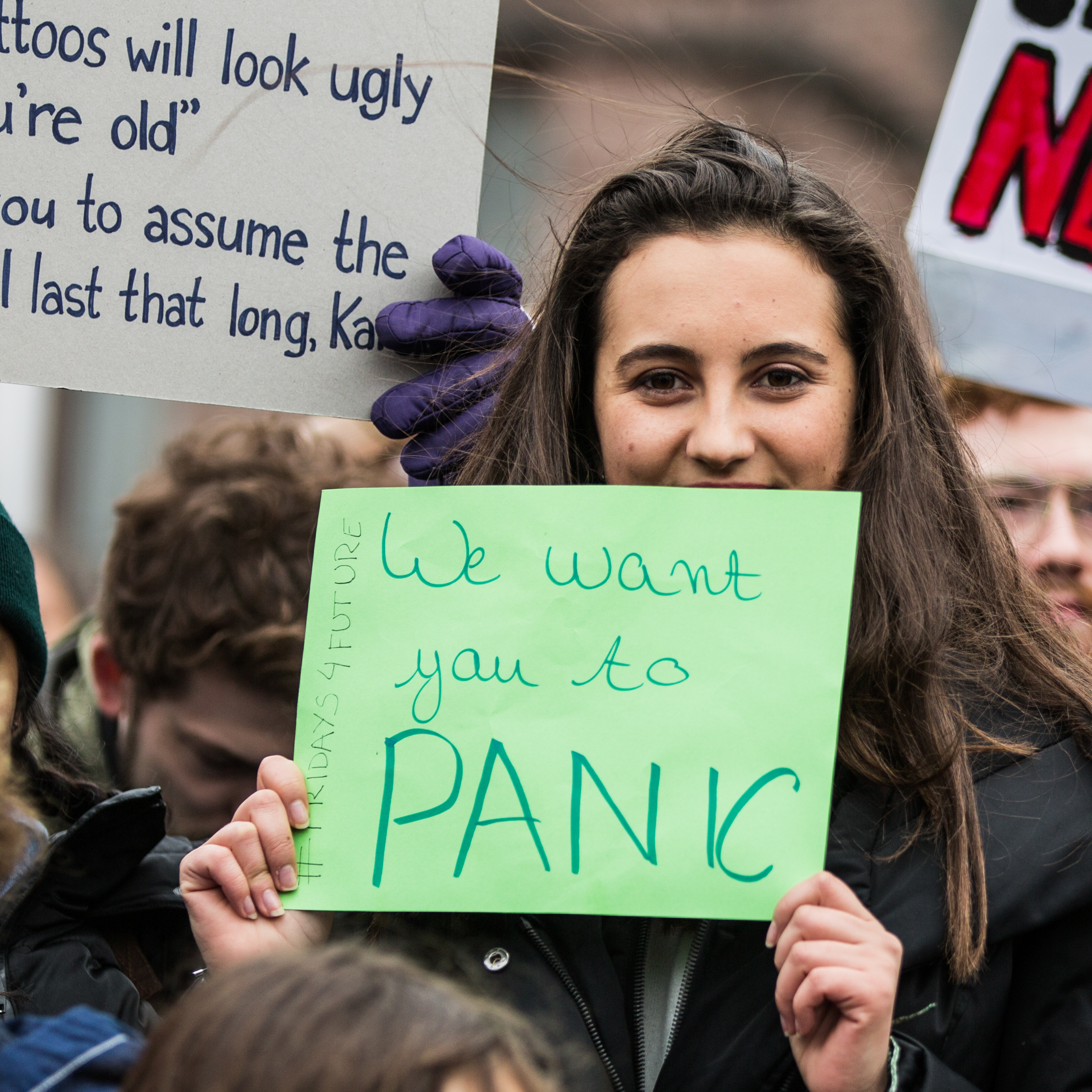
Rougeot protesting at "Fridays for future" 15 March 2019

Aliénor Rougeot (born in 1999) is a Canadian-French climate justice activist.

Rougeot came to national prominence in Canada as a Climate Strike organizer. She was a leader for Toronto's Fridays for Future Strikes, a movement calling on students to miss school on Fridays to raise awareness for climate change. In 2019 she led the Fridays for Future school strike for climate in Toronto which brought out over 50 000 people.

She is now at Environmental Defence Canada, leading initiatives to accelerate the energy transition and address environmental injustices.

== Activism ==
Rougeot started as a local activist at a very young age, raising awareness of biodiversity loss within her community. She was also involved with her local Amnesty International chapter where she led campaigns to raise awareness for the refugee crisis and demand justice for migrants and refugees in Europe.

=== Climate justice ===
Aliénor Rougeot co-organized the youth climate strike and led Canada's mass “teach-in” at Toronto's mass climate strike as part of the Global Week for Future in September 2019, an event that drew thousands of people to the grounds of Queen's Park.

=== Energy Transition ===
Rougeot writes about addressing the health impacts of the oil industry, about the need for just transition plans for workers impacted by the energy transition, and about the importance of investing in renewable energy.

== Education ==
Alienor graduated with an Honours BA from Victoria College at the University of Toronto, in Canada, where she studied Economics and Public Policy. She was recognized as a UTAA Scholar for her academic excellence and community involvement.

== Awards and recognition ==
For her climate justice advocacy, Rougeot has been recognized as one of the:

- 30 Under 30 Sustainability Leaders in 2019 by Corporate Knights
- Top 25 Under 25 Environmentalists in 2020 by The Starfish
- 50 most influential Torontonians by Toronto Life magazine in 2019
- Emerging Leaders, Clean 50 by Clean 50
