= Flossie Donnelly =

Irish environmentalist (born 2007)

Flossie Donnelly (born 2007) is an Irish marine environmentalist. A secondary school student, Donnelly was the first to bring seabins to Ireland, securing funds for two of the devices which remove plastic trash from bodies of water. Recently she appeared on RTE News to promote her work.

== Life ==
Donnelly grew up in Sandycove, Co Dublin. Her activism first began on a family trip to Thailand when she was eight years old. Whilst on holiday, she was taken aback by the amount of plastic pollution she observed on the beaches she visited. She spent a considerable amount of time on that trip collecting rubbish from the sea and bringing it back to the hotel her family were staying at. On her return to Ireland, she noticed more and more rubbish being washed up on local beaches and felt an urge to share her passion around protecting marine life and to educate others about plastic pollution. She has had several press mentions for her environmental conservation work since then and has been dubbed Ireland's Greta Thunberg.

=== Education ===
Donnelly is a secondary school student in Booterstown, Co Dublin. She has previously studied in two primary schools one in Brussels and a French school in Dublin.

Donnelly is dyslexic.

=== Activism ===
Donnelly regularly engages in climate strikes either outside her school or the Dáil and organizes beach cleanups in Dún Laoghaire and Sandycove, along her local South Dublin coastline. She started an environmental charity and action group called Flossie & the Beach Cleaners when she was eleven to raise awareness about plastic pollution and its consequences for oceans and marine life. She raised €4,000 for two seabins into Ireland. The devices can remove up to 83,000 plastic bags or 20,000 plastic bottles from the sea in a year. On World Oceans Day in June 2018, she led Ireland's only March for the Ocean event in Dún Laoghaire. She spoke at a TEDx Dún Laoghaire event in October 2018. In October 2019, RTÉjr announced that they would follow Donnelly's journey to the Citarum River in Indonesia, one of the world's dirtiest 'plastic' rivers, in a two-part documentary series titled My Story: The Beach Cleaner. This was one of her many public engagements with schools and the youth in Ireland on the solutions to plastic pollution.

=== Awards ===
Donnelly was named the Lions Clubs Ireland Young Ambassador for 2023 and The Lions Club European Young Ambassador November 2023
