= Nkosilathi Nyathi =

UNICEF Zimbabwe Climate Advocate

- Born: 2003 (age 22–23); Victoria Falls, Zimbabwe
- Years active: 2014–present
- Known for: Climate advocacy
- Awards: UNICEF Youth Climate Ambassador for Zimbabwe in 2015; Officially appointed UNICEF Youth Climate Ambassador for Zimbabwe for 2020 & Beyond

Nkosilathi Nyathi (born 2003) is a Zimbabwean UNICEF Climate Advocate. He started campaigning at the age of 10 and advocates for youth inclusion in decision making roles. He is of the opinion youths’ efforts towards climate justice can not materialize if they can’t make calls at decision making platforms. Nkosilathi was at 2019 United Nations Climate Change Conference COP25 in Madrid campaigning for more climate actions and youth inclusion from world leaders.

== Environmental Activism ==
Nkosilathi Nyathi was raised in Victoria Falls. He traced back his environmental activism journey to the day he stood up with consciousness at a garbage dumping site at Victoria Falls and becoming more aware of the environment issues in his immediate community. He started noticing the effects of climate change in his environment at the age of 11 in Grade 5 at Chamabondo Primary School in Zimbabwe. Victoria Fall witnessed the worst drought in a century in 2019. 7.7 million Zimbabwean people are food insecure and 45 million people of southern Africans at risk of hunger. There is also an unprecedented acute malnutrition rates of over five per cent in eight of the Zimbabwean’s districts. All these issues manifesting in his community triggered him to start teaching his community about climate change and to continuously call for reduction the global emissions and he has pledge ever to relent until decision makers start taking considerable climate actions.

He was a leader in his primary school climate club, Ozone Defenders Club. He led the creation of the first bio gas plant in the city of Victoria Falls to transform growing waste to produce sustainable energy in 2016. The biogas station is now used for preparation of student’s food. Nkosinathi is not good in sports but he has good oratory skills. His continuous usage of his oratory skill to call on the government to address environmental issues and pay more attention to climate change earns him recognition by UNICEF to attend the 2019 edition of United Nations Framework Convention on Climate Change 25th Conference of the Parties (COP25) that took place in Madrid, where he shared a panel with some of the world's influential leaders like John Kerry the first United States special presidential envoy for climate. He also delivered a speech at the Group of Friends of Children and the Sustainable Development Goals (SDGs) meetings at the 2020 Africa Regional Forum on Sustainable Development which was held at Victoria Falls. At the meeting, he advocated for youth inclusion from world leaders, he also participated in Youth For Climate Driving Ambition Event in Milan Italy and had the pleasure of being at the Dubai Expo 2020. He has also featured on Ted Talk. His awareness continues to grow and has led to him sharing big stages with some members of the SADC community including the World Children's Day 2021 with Zimbabwean President Emerson Mnangagwa, President of Botswana Mokgweetsi Eric Keabetswe Masisi, President of Namibia Hage Gottfried Geingob, and the President of Zambia Hakainde Hichilema. He has also met with the former President of Colombia Juan Manuel Santos and the former Minister of International Development in Norway Dag Inge Ulstein amongst some of these influential people he has also met the former President of Ireland Mary Therese Winifred Robinson. As a member of press club in his school, he writes educational articles about the environment and climate.

== Awards and Recognition ==
- UNICEF Youth Climate Ambassador for Zimbabwe in 2015.
- Youth Ambassador for Greenline Africa since 2014.
