= Diwigdi Valiente =

Panamanian climate activist

- Citizenship: Panama
- Occupation: Climate activist
- Organization: Burwigan

Diwigdi ("Diwi") Valiente is an indigenous climate activist from the Guna people in Panama. He communicates with international audiences about the effects of climate change and sea level rise on his community, who mostly live on coastal islands in Guna Yala. He founded the organization "Burwigan" which means "children" in Guna, to advocate for the community and bring attention to the issue of climate change by inviting artists to document the effects on the community. He is also an advocate for sustainable tourism, and opened a hostel in 2018 with his business partner, Allen Lim.

He was profiled by the Spanish newspaper El País in 2019 and in 2020, La Prensa named him one of the top 10 future leaders of Panama.

== Personal life ==
He is the son of Aresio Valiente López, an environmental lawyer. He was raised mostly in Panama City.

== See also ==
- Guna people
- Climate change and Indigenous peoples
