= Matilde Alvim =

Portuguese climate change activist

- Born: Quinta do Anjo, Palmela, Setúbal District, Portugal
- Known for: One of the organizers of student climate strikes in Portugal in 2019

Matilde Alvim is a Portuguese environmental activist, one of those responsible for organizing the student climate strikes (Fridays for Future) in Portugal that were inspired by the activities of the Swedish activist Greta Thunberg.

== Biography ==
Alvim comes from the parish of Quinta do Anjo, which is part of Palmela, in the Setúbal District of Portugal, south of the capital of Lisbon and close to the Arrábida Natural Park. A student at the Palmela Secondary School when the student protests began, she is now an anthropology student in the Faculty of Social and Human Sciences of the NOVA University Lisbon.

== Activism ==
She was inspired by environmental issues from a young age, remembering being strongly affected by a newspaper article about the Great Pacific Garbage Patch. This made her realise that environmental problems, especially the climate crisis, cannot be solved by individual action alone and that there is a need to go to the source of the problem. In particular, she has blamed the fossil-fuel industry, which, she has argued, has invested in disinformation and lobbying campaigns to influence governments not to adhere to international emissions-reduction commitments. She argues that the world has to reach carbon neutrality by 2030, rather than 2050, the date proposed by the Portuguese government.

Alvim became involved in climate activism in 2019, together with a friend, Beatriz Barroso. They were initially prepared to demonstrate on their own, as had Greta Thunberg, but the support for "Fridays for Future" school strikes spread rapidly, with an initial demonstration in Lisbon followed by Friday strikes throughout the country. Over 30 student groups became involved, with particular support in Porto and Coimbra. On 15 March 2019, 20,000 students gathered in Lisbon.

== Open Letter to the Minister of the Environment ==
On 3 December 2019, Alvim wrote an open letter to the Minister of the Environment, criticizing the government's approach to the climate emergency. Among other things, she objected to plans for a new Lisbon Airport and for the dredging of the Sado River. Among other demands by the protestors was the need to ban the exploitation of natural gas in Portugal and cancel a plan for a gas pipeline.

== Greta Thunberg's reception in Lisbon ==
On the same day as the publication of her open letter, Alvim was part of a reception committee that received Greta Thunberg in Lisbon, on her return to Europe from New York, en route to the United Nations (UN) climate summit, called COP25, which was taking place in Madrid. Thunberg, who refuses to fly because of the impact flying has on the environment, arrived by yacht. Alvim made a speech re-iterating some of the points made in her letter to the minister.

== COVID-19 Impact ==
During the COVID pandemic, when demonstrations were not possible, Alvim continued to keep the issue of climate change at the forefront of people's minds, writing articles for newspapers and being interviewed.
