= Germán Sánchez Ruipérez Foundation =

Spanish non-profit

The Germán Sánchez Ruipérez Foundation is a non-profit Spanish institution, constituted in October 1981 and recognized by the Ministry of Culture of Spain.

Its general mission is the creation, promotion and development of all types of cultural activities, especially books and reading. The Foundation conducts its programs at three centres, located in Madrid, Salamanca and Peñaranda de Bracamonte. In the words of president Germán Sánchez Ruipérez: "Our Foundation is charged with an ambitious cultural and educative project in a democratic society. To stimulate the varied forms of cultural creation, to contribute to the promotion of reading, enhancing education, innovation, and the development of university studies, these are objectives that orient our actions."

== Branches ==
=== Research and Debate Center ===
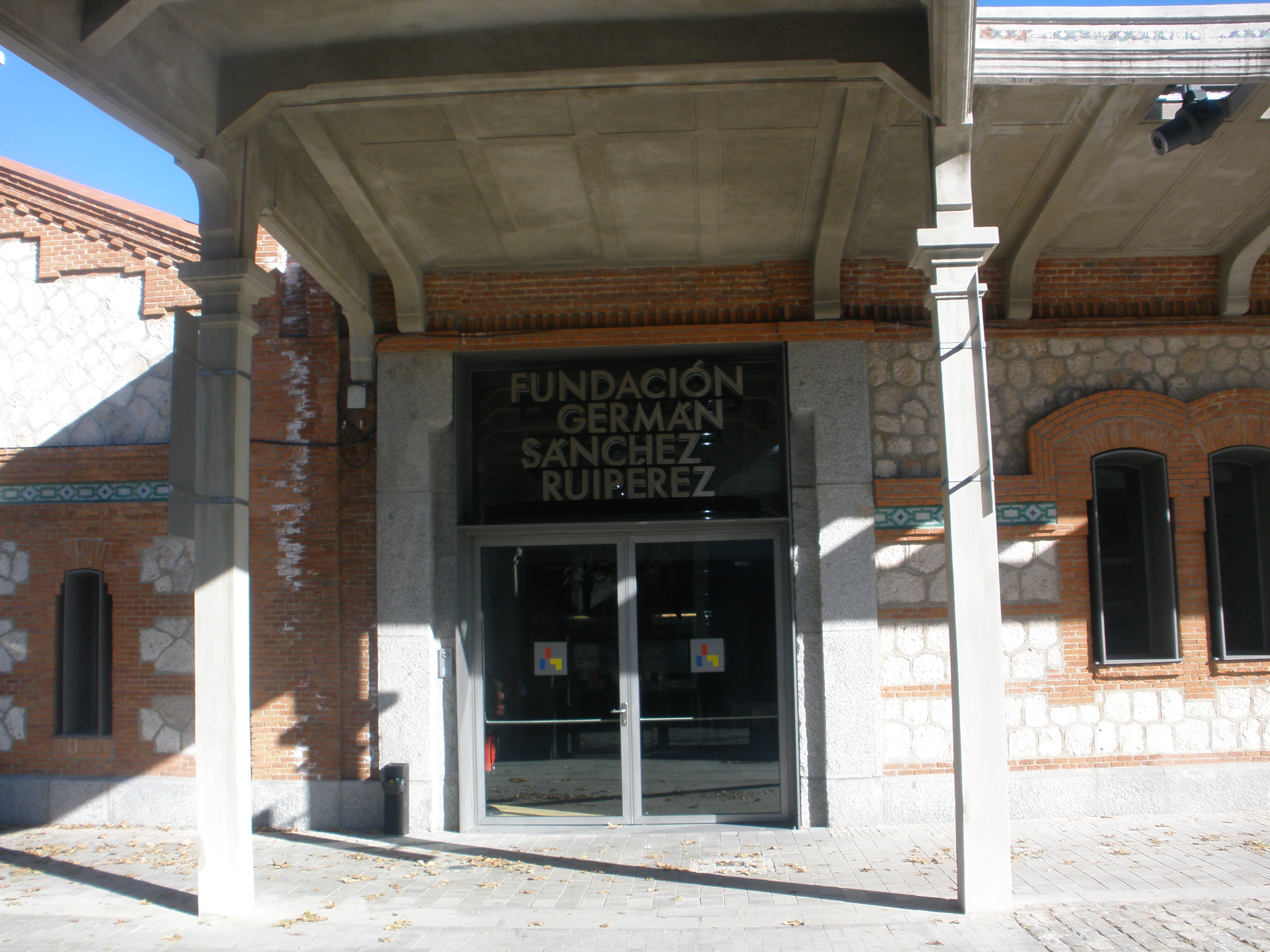
Germán Sánchez Ruipérez Foundation premises in Matadero Madrid.

Located in Madrid, the Research and Debate Center concerns itself with libraries and reading, as well as other cultural activities. It has a publishing department that publishes books related to the wellbeing and spread of written culture.

=== International Center for Baby and Children's Books ===
Located in Salamanca, the International Center for Baby and Children's Books, specializes in promoting reading and baby and children's literature. It features a complex library open to the public and a documentation center. It also investigates cultural and educational activities.

=== International Center for Technological Advancement ===
Located in Peñaranda de Bracamonte, in the province of Salamanca, the International Center for Technological Advancement works on developing technologies for society.

=== Center for Sociocultural Development ===
Also in Peñaranda de Bracamonte, the Center for Sociocultural Development manages library services and public culture. It also conducts studies in public reading, through its Department of Analysis and Studies.
