= Xiomara Acevedo =

Colombian climate activist; founder and CEO of Barranquilla +20

- Occupation: Climate change activist
- Employer: Barranquilla +20

Xiomara Acevedo is a Colombian climate change activist. As founder and CEO of the NGO Barranquilla +20, she has argued for the inclusion of women and young people's voices in climate justice.

== Career ==
Acevedo founded Barranquilla +20 in 2012, and as of 2022, is the CEO. Barranquilla +20 is a youth-led non-governmental organization focused on climate activism and environmentalism in Barranquilla and throughout Latin America.

Acevedo co-founded the network "El Orinoco se adapta" (Orinoco adapts), which uses a gender-based approach toward addressing and adapting to climate change in the Orinoquía natural region, around 2014.

In 2015, Acevedo worked for the World Wide Fund for Nature in Paraguay.

From 2016 to 2019, Acevedo worked as a climate change expert for the government of Nariño, Colombia, coordinating climate change policy.

In 2021, Acevedo attended the 2021 United Nations Climate Change Conference (COP26), as part of the Women and Gender Constituency. She advocated for the importance of women's rights in achieving climate justice.

Acevedo directs the Women for Climate Justice project (a project of Barranquilla +20), a 2021 initiative that emphasizes the climate leadership of young women from across Colombia. Barranquilla +20 was awarded $50,000 for the project by the Bill & Melinda Gates Foundation in 2021.

Acevedo is on the steering committee of the Global Youth Biodiversity Network and the Youth Fund Committee of the Global Youth Climate Action Fund.

== Personal life ==
Acevedo is from Barranquilla, Colombia.

Acevedo is a graduate of Universidad del Norte, Colombia, from which she took a degree in international relations, with a focus on international law. Acevedo attended the Frankfurt School of Finance & Management, where she studied climate finance.
