= Rahmina Paullete =

Kenyan activist and environmentalist

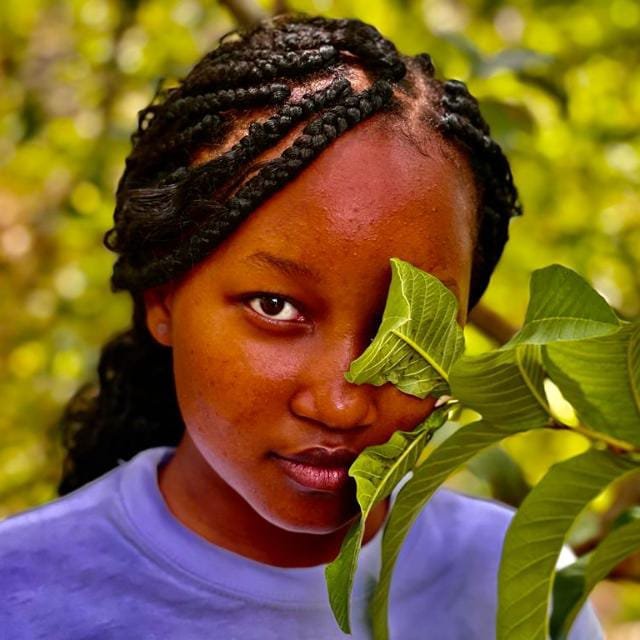
- Born: 19 November 2005 (age 20); Kisumu, Kenya
- Education: Kisumu Senior School
- Occupation: Activist
- Organization: Kisumu Environmental Champs
- Known for: Environmental activist
- Notable work: Climate activist
- Website: https://rahminapaullete.com/

Rahmina Paullete, commonly known as Rahmina, is a Kenyan climate activist. She is the head campaigner for #LetLakeVictoriaBreatheAgain that advocates for the restoration of Lake Victoria. She is also the founder of Kisumu Environmental Champions, an organization that does environmental wildlife conservation and climate change advocacy.

== Education ==
Rahimna sat for her Kenya Certificate of Primary Education (KCPE) at the M.A Junior Academy in 2019. She studied at Kisumu Senior Academy where she completed her IGCSE. She is currently an International Relations student at Daystar University.

== Career ==
Paullete is the head campaigner for #LetLakeVictoriaBreatheAgain that advocates for the restoration of Lake Victoria. She is the founder of Kisumu Environmental Champions, an organization that does environmental wildlife conservation and climate change advocacy. She is a member of the Wangari Maathai Foundation and is a part of Fridays For Future. In 2021, she was among the delegates who represented Kenya in the COP26 summit which happened in Glasgow, Scotland.

== Awards ==
- 2016 Green Kids Award
- 2018 Environmental Ambassador Kisumu County
