= Bert Tucker =

Belizean diplomat & politician (1944–2014)

- Born: 1944; Belize City, Belize
- Died: 2014 (aged 69–70)
- Occupations: Environmentalist, Community Sustainable Development Coordinator

Adalbert Alexander Tucker (1944–2014) was a Belizean diplomat and politician. He was the Ambassador for Foreign Trade in the Ministry of Foreign Affairs and Trade in 2008. He is best known for his community ecological activism for the Belize River Valley Development Program (BELRIV).

BELRIV is a community-based cultural and ecology project to promote sustainable development. He pioneered and developed the BELRIV 'OASIS' project. He graduated from the University of the West Indies, and Harvard. Tucker was an excellent community organizer, international consultant, community environmental project coordinator, activist, humanist, Pan Africanist (Pan-Africanism), Internationalist, Renaissance man, scholar, technocrat, writer, and poet.

"A very passionate nationalist; very powerful sense of humor; a tremendous memory and just a very kind individual. He really was into education. He saw education as being vital for us".

== Early life ==
Bert Tucker was privately schooled with Ms. Annette Maheia. He then went on to Belize Technical College, University of the West Indies, and Harvard University.

He has well documented his experiences as a student at University of the West Indies in the 60s and 70s in the article Jamaican Vibrations - Rocking Steady to Reggae. This article articulates the early days of Reggae, University of West Indies student movement, the rise of Michael Manley, a peoples' mass movement, Abeng Movement, and the People's National Party. As Jamaica confronted injustices and poverty. The article is a poetic expression of Jamaican history during the 1960s, and Tucker's experience. He documents what was called the 'Rodney Riots', when Walter Rodney a professor of African history and a Black Power Movement advocate was banned from returning to his position as professor at the University of the West Indies (Mona campus).

== Career ==
Bert Tucker received a master's degree in Economics from the University of the West Indies. He did post-graduate work in law and international relations at Harvard University.

Tucker's lifelong work was for the advancement and development of the human race. He worked in many troubled spots across the world, especially in Africa and in the Caribbean. For three decades he worked for over fourteen countries. He acted as a consultant for Liberia, Namibia, Grenada, and Zimbabwe. He worked in Jamaica during the Michael Manley years. He worked for the United Nations in the 80s in sustainable development. He worked with Ghanaian President, Jerry Rawlings in the 1970s and 1980s.

For many years Bert Tucker was a United Nations Advisor to several countries in the Caribbean and Africa. He graduated from the University of the West Indies, and Harvard. His lifelong work was for the advancement and development of the human race. He worked in many troubled spots across the world, especially in Africa and in the Caribbean. He was involved in the rebuilding of Jamaica during the Michael Manley era. The rebuilding of Grenada during the Maurice Bishop era New Jewel Movement, and the rebuilding of Namibia during the era of (the Southwest Africa People's Organization), SWAPO. When Tucker worked with Grenada, Namibia and Jamaica these countries were in turmoil.

He was an adviser and consultant for the Mandela Center in Belize. He was a visiting lecturer for universities in many countries in particular – in the United States of America, Africa and Latin America.

Tucker was one of Belize's leading advocate and support for the work of Henry C. Fairweather. Mr. Fairweather was known as the "Mahogany Man". Mr. Fairweather's mission was to replant mahogany trees in Belize. Bert Tucker took on this cause and became known as "Mahogany Man', too. Mr. Fairweather was still planting mahogany trees into his 90s. He used his own money, and land to create a legacy; and to build a future for future generations. "Children and Trees Growing Together, A Future for Both', was the theme of the project between BELRIV and the mahogany plantation.

Well we thought that it was fitting to bring in the notion that children and trees can grow together into prosperity, that they need each other, can live together, that they are dependent on each other.

— Bert Tucker

Bert Tucker was the founder of the Isaiah Emmanuel Morter organization to honor the work and legacy of Isaiah Morter; a self-made man. Morter is reported as being Belize's first colored millionaire. Morter built his fortune on growing bananas and coconuts. He was a strong supporter of Marcus Garvey 's Universal Negro Improvement Association and African Communities League. He once owned Cave Chapel.

On May 18, 2014 at the Venezuela Embassy in Belmopan a tribute to honor the work and character of Bert Tucker was held. It was given by Yoel Pérez Marcano, Ambassador of the Bolivarian Republic of Venezuela to Belize. The Ambassador from Venezuela described Bert Tucker as "a visionary, revolutionist, and a man who dedicated his life to fight against colonialism". A hall in the Venezuela Embassy in Belmopan was dedicated to honor Bert Tucker. Mr. Vernon Cord, a lifelong friend of Bert Tucker spoke at the tribute off his character as "passion for change, progressive thinking and empowerment of the less fortunate".

There has also been a street in Belmopan to honor Bert Tucker.

The Commission for Reparation in Belize was started in 2013. It was initiated by Bert Tucker.

== Quotes ==
It is in the confluence of our minds where all rivers meet, you'll find me there at the Zambezi

— Bert Tucker

Bert would say,

"We must fight the right fight"
The things that challenge us
Is only pretend
For once a people become mobilized
In righteousness there is no
Force that can stop them

....Do the research; we need to get the facts
And then do the interpretation
Together as a people unified
Engaged in prosperity. Let's get growing!!!
Sovereignty...Humanity...Livelihood...Patrimony
Belize Common ground to Sanctuary Approach.
