= Ilyess El Kortbi =

Ukrainian climate activist

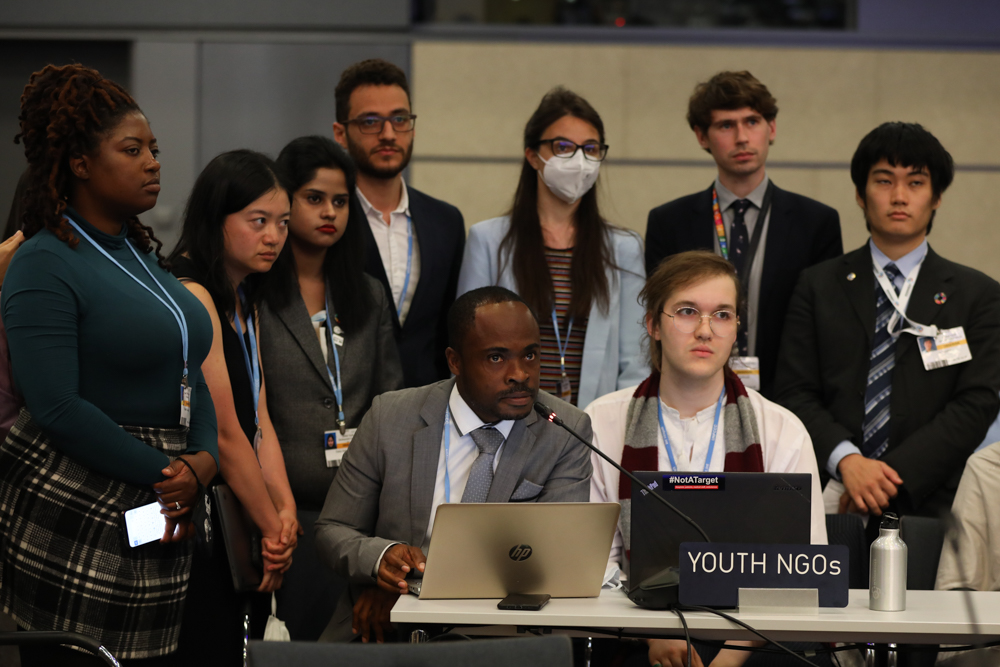
Iyless El Kortbi (sitting on the right) at the United Nations Climate Change Conference in Bonn, Germany

Ilyess El Kortbi is a Ukrainian climate activist. He has protested the climate crisis and the Russo-Ukrainian War.

His climate work focuses on organizing youth, building climate‑focused civil society in Ukraine, and ensuring Ukrainian voices are present in global climate discussions. He said the war disrupts the country's ability to address climate change. Ukraine's leaders may be present at global climate conferences but they are primarily focused on meeting winter heating needs and ensuring it has enough natural gas supplies during war.

== Early life and career ==
El Kortbi grew up in Ukraine and Morocco. He is a founding member of the Fridays for Future chapter in Kharkiv, Ukraine. El Kortbi helped found and is the board secretary for Fridays for Future Ukraine.

He was a coordinator of the Ukrainian delegation to the 16th United Nations Climate Change Conference of Youth.

He protested at the 2022 United Nations Climate Change Conference.
