= Kevin Mtai =

Climate activist

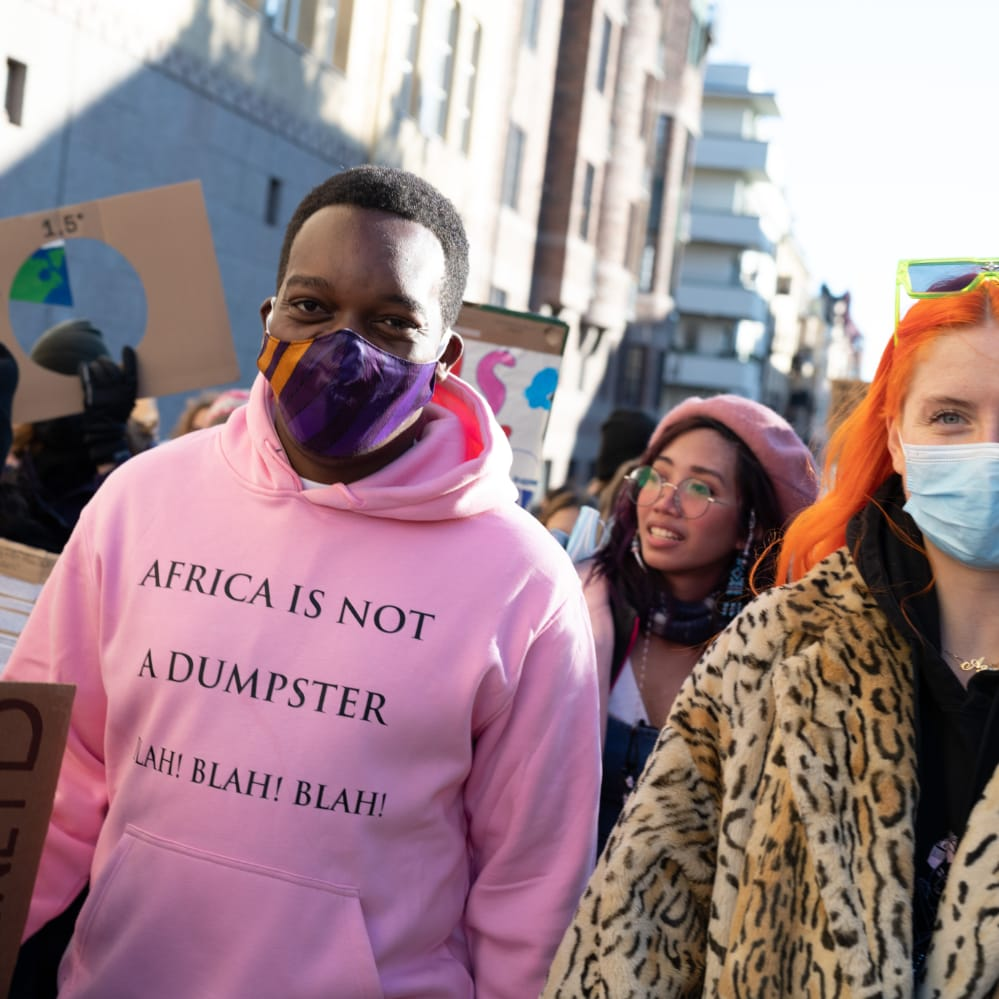
Kevin at a climate strike in Sweden

Kevin Mtai (from Soy, Kenya) is a Kenya climate justice activist and environmentalist. A Former event coordinator at MockCop26. He is a Co-Founder and Director of Global Development for Earth Uprising International Earth Uprising where he has been advocating for climate education in Kenya and Africa. He is a member of Loss and Damage Youth Coalition and he has advocated for the conservation of Nairobi National Park. Mtai is an organiser at Climate Live which uses music concerts to raise awareness and educate people about climate change. Mtai has also been a campaigner for Food@COP.

Additionally, he is the co-founder of Kenya Environmental Action Network (KEAN) where he has been supporting upcoming activists and environmental sustainability leaders by creating a space for meaningful engagement and supporting implementation of local action to address the climate and biodiversity crises in Kenya. He plays an active role in Fridays for Future International, and works to make sure that the stories of the Most Affected Peoples and Areas (Friday for Future MAPA) are centred on the global fight for climate justice.

In 2020, he coordinated the campaign Africa is not Dumpster where he fought against the export of plastic into Kenya by the American Chemistry Council. In July 2021, Mtai was part of a campaign to stop a hotel being built in Nairobi's National Park that activists said would endanger local wildlife.

Mtai was listed as one of the top 100 influential people in Kenya in 2021 on Kenyans.co.ke.

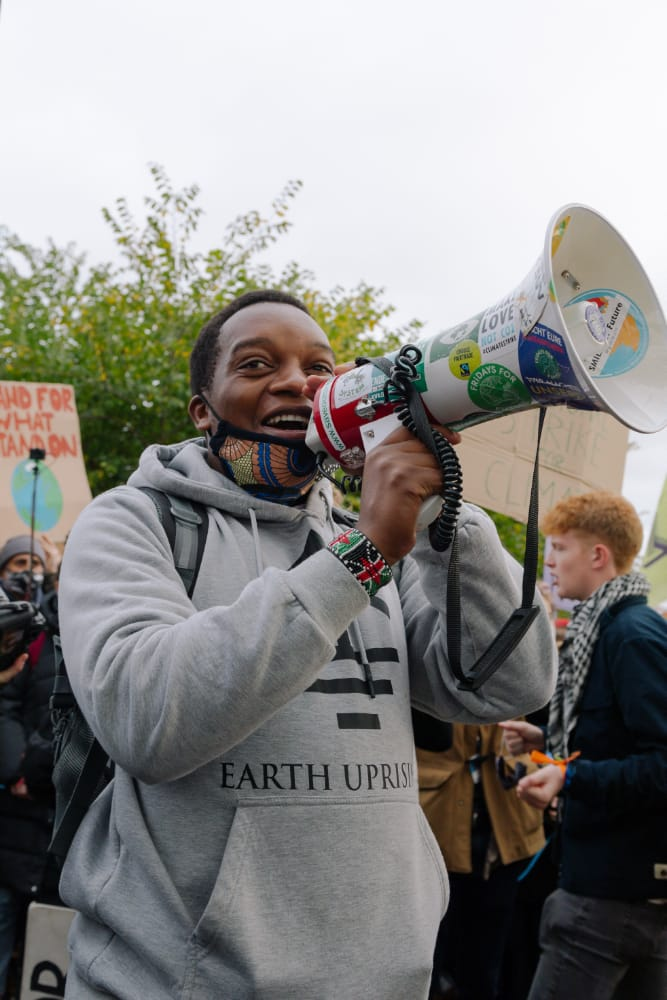
Kevin Mtai at a COP26 protest in Glasgow
