= Hossein Sadri =

Iranian Azerbaijani scholar and activist

Personal details
- Born: 9 October 1979 (age 47) Tabriz, Imperial State of Iran
- Education: Islamic Azad University of Tabriz (M.Sc. in Architecture); University of Tabriz (Islamic Philosophy ); Hacettepe University (Human Rights Philosophy); Yildiz Technical University (History of Architecture); Central European University (Sustainable Human Development and Urban Transition); Gazi University (Ph.D. in Architecture)
- Website: https://pureportal.coventry.ac.uk/en/persons/hossein-sadri

Hossein Sadri is a British scholar and activist of Iranian Azerbaijani descent. He is currently working as the director of MArch at Coventry University.

== Career ==
Between 2010 and 2021, Sadri worked as a professor of architecture and urban design at Girne American University where he held the position of the dean of the faculty of architecture, design & fine arts between 2012–2016. He held also academic teaching and research positions at Islamic Azad University of Tabriz in IRAN (2003–2005), Azerbaijan National Academy of Sciences(2006), American University in Canterbury – UK (2011), and City University of New York in the USA (2018). He studied undergraduate and graduate courses in the departments of Architecture, Philosophy, and Environmental Sciences and Policy at Islamic Azad University of Tabriz in IRAN (1997–2005), Gazi University (2006–2010), Hacettepe University (2007), and Yildiz Technical University (2007) in TURKEY, and Central European University in HUNGARY (2007 & 2008).

His research won several awards including Royal Institute of British Architects Research Fund in 2025. He also won the Iranian National Prize for Study and Research for three consecutive years and PhD Research Fellow from Scientific and Technological Research Council of Türkiye. He co-edited Cities without Capitalism, foreword by Peter Marcuse and published by Routledge in 2022. His Ph.D. dissertation entitled Architecture and Human Rights was an interdisciplinary studies on the spatiality of human rights.

As a human rights activist, he is a member of Amnesty International and since 2006 he worked respectively as Ankara Coordinator, National Coordinator of Urgent Action in Turkey, National Coordinator of Counter Terror with Justice Campaign, Coordinator of Istanbul, EU Contact Person of Amnesty International Turkey, Member of International Relations Group and National Coordinator of Human Rights Education in Turkey.

He is an endurance runner and runs marathons to fundraise for human rights causes.

== Books ==
- Cities without Capitalism, Collaboratively with Senem Zeybekoğlu, Routledge, 2021
- Neo-Liberalism and the Architecture of the Post Professional Era, Springer, 2018, ISBN 978-3-319-76266-1

== Selected publications ==
- Urbanization as Taxidermy: 'Man'hattanization of Mannahatta
- Miniature as a way of representation in design studio: a case study,
- De-Urbanization and the Right to the De-Urbanized City,
- Urbanization: Planting Forests in Pots
- Urban Cages and Domesticated Humans
- Profession vs Ethics
- "Özgürleştirici Mimarlık Eğitimi" (Liberating Architectural Education), Journal of Critical Pedagogy, 2013
- "Etik Bir Sorun Olarak Mimarlar İş-Galindeki Mimarlik" (Architecture Under the Occupation of Architects as an Ethical Problem), Serbest Mimar Journal, 2013
- "Professional Ethics in Architecture and Responsibilities of Architects towards Humanity", Turkish Journal of Business Ethics, 2012
- "Mimarlık ve İnsan Hakları" (Architecture and Human Rights), Mimarlik Journal of Architecture, 2012
- "Şark Şehrinin Uyanışı: Nakş-I Cihan Meydanının İnşası ve Şehircilikte İfahan Okulu" (Revival of an Eastern City: Construction of Naqsh-e Jahan Square and Isfahan School of Urbanism), Mimarlik Journal of Architecture, 2011
- "Mekan ve İnsan Hakları" (Space and Human Rights) 2011
- "Kadınların Kent Hakkı" (Women's Right to the City), 2011
