= Wanjuhi Njoroge =

Kenyan entrepreneur and activist

- Born: 1989 (age 36–37); Kabaru, Nyeri County, Kenya
- Education: B.A. Sociology and Communication, University of Nairobi 2011-2013, Diploma in Business Information Technology, Strathmore University 2008-2009

Wanjuhi Njoroge (born 1989) is a Kenyan entrepreneur and activist, who campaigns against climate change. She calls for improvements to digital access and gender rights. She is a member of the African Women Leader's Network (AWLN).

== Biography ==
Njoroge was born in 1989 and grew up in Kabaru, a village in Nyeri County, Kenya. She studied Sociology and Communication at the University of Nairobi, and was awarded a Diploma in Business Information Technology from Strathmore University. She is founder and president of the communications company Nelig Group, as well as the non-profit RootEd Africa, which works with schools and local communities to teach coding and innovation. RootEd aims to create employment through online jobs, reduce the rate of school dropout, especially amongst adolescent women, and to bring economic activity to villages through digital markets. In 2017 RootEd partnered with Safaricom to establish a modern library in Kabaru. Through her work she has also supported local farmers to move to more sustainable farming practices.

In 2018 she was awarded a Young Leaders Project (YELP) Fellowship by the LéO Africa Institute. In 2019 Njoroge joined the Kenyan national chapter of the African Women Leader's Network (AWLN), which was launched at the UN Headquarters in New York in June 2017, under the auspices of the African Union Commission (AUC) and the United Nations (UN). On 28 January 2021, Wanjuhi took part in a panel event of international experts called Climate Change: Why should we care?, organised by the Science Museum Group.

Njoroge has held a number of positions where she has worked to reduce inequality, including her role as a Vital Voices Fellow; She is affiliated with the World Economic Forum, both as a member of its Global Shaper community and as the leader of the Nairobi group. She is also part of the team implementing the Internet for All Project within the World Economic Forum.

== Awards ==
- Top 40 Under 40 (2016) - for her work in improving education, and increasing school admission & retention rates in rural Africa.
