= Penelope Lea =

Norwegian climate activist

- Born: Kjelsås, Oslo, Norway
- Known for: Environmentalism, climate change mitigation

Penelope Lea is a Norwegian climate activist who became the second-youngest ambassador for UNICEF at the age of 15.

== Activism ==
Lea is from Kjelsås, Oslo. Her mother is a children's book writer. When she was eight, Lea joined the Eco-Agents, a youth climate group. She gave her first speech aged nine at a Nature and Youth national camp. She was elected as a board member of the Eco-Agents when she was 11. At twelve, Lea was one of seven people to join the Children's Climate Panel, founded by the Eco-Agents.

In 2018, Lea became the youngest nominee for the Frivillighetsprisen (Volunteer Award), at the age of fourteen. She won the award and donated the kr 50,000 (US$6,000 in 2019) prize to a lawsuit filed jointly by Greenpeace and Nature and Youth against the Norwegian government for its oil contracts.

In 2019, Lea became a climate advisor to Knut Storberget and was a youth ambassador for Norway at the UNICEF summit for World Children's Day. In October 2019, Lea became the first climate ambassador for UNICEF; her age of 15 made her the second-youngest UNICEF ambassador in history. She was the fifth Norwegian ambassador and the first to be appointed since 2007. At the 2019 United Nations Climate Change Conference (COP25), Lea was one of five child activists to speak at an event organized by UNICEF and the OHCHR.

== Books ==
- Lea, Penelope (2021). I hverandres verden. 11 samtaler om klima, natur, aktivisme, politikk og menneskerettigheter [In Each Other's World. 11 talks on climate, nature, activism, politics and human rights].
