= Mitzi Jonelle Tan =

Filipino climate activist (born 1997)

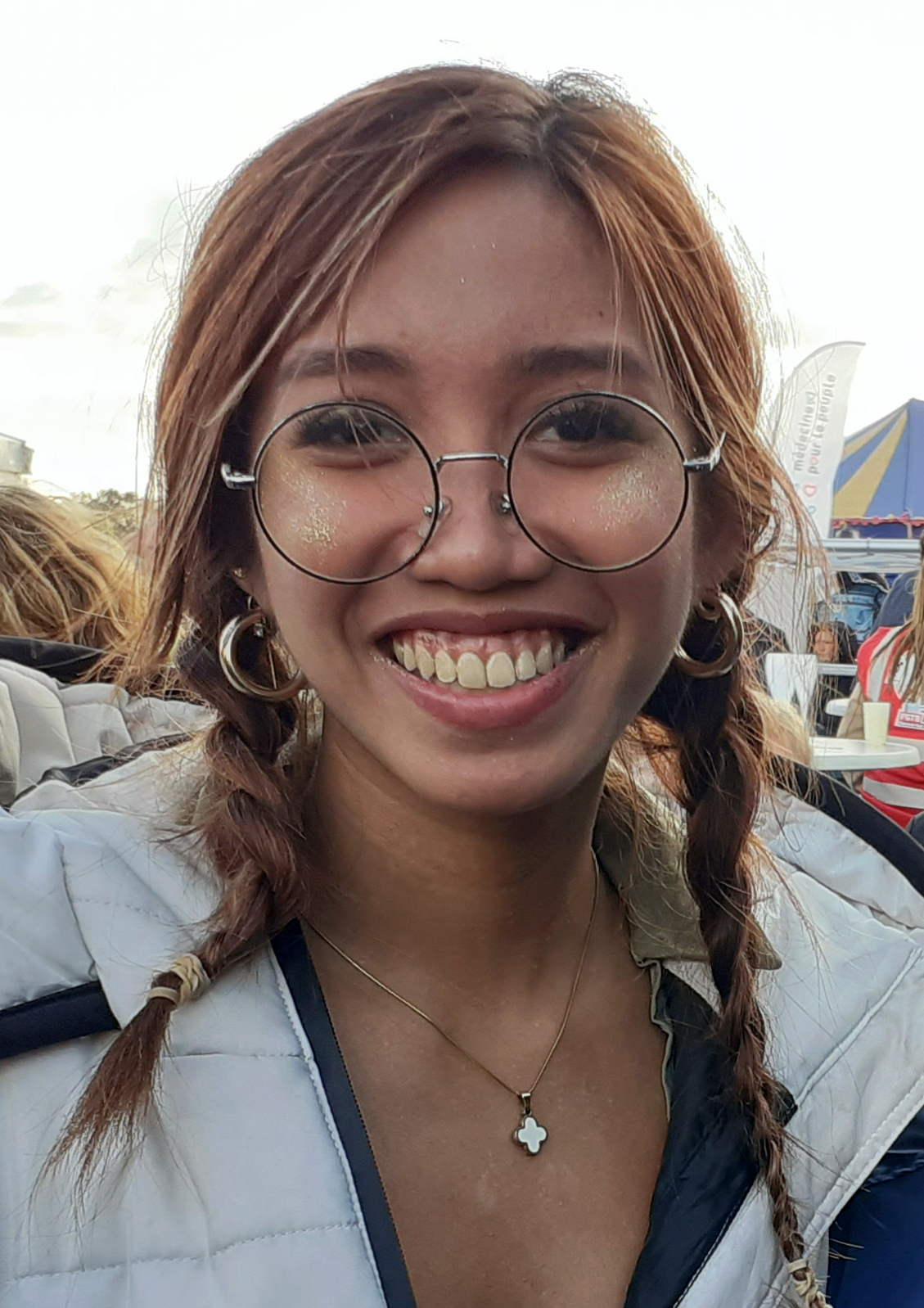
- Mitzi Jonelle Tan, ManiFiesta 2022
- Born: October 27, 1997 (age 28); Philippines
- Occupation: Climate Justice Activist
- Years active: 2017-present
- Organization: YACAP
- Known for: Environmentalism
- Political party: Bayan Muna

Mitzi Jonelle Tan (born October 27, 1997) is a Filipino climate justice activist. She lives in Metro Manila, Philippines.

== Biography ==
=== 2017 ===
Tan's activism started in 2017 after meeting with indigenous leaders in her country. This made her realize that collective action and systemic change are necessary to create a more just and green society.

=== 2019 ===
In 2019, Tan co-founded Youth Advocates for Climate Action Philippines (YACAP), the Fridays For Future (FFF) organization of the Philippines, following climate demonstrations around the world. Tan is the lead convener and international spokesperson of YACAP. Tan is also a Fridays for Future activist in the Philippines, and spokesperson.

Tan was part of the move to take school strikes for climate online at the start of the Covid-19 pandemic.

=== 2020 ===
In September 2020, Tan was part of a move to return to 'safe' climate protests. In late 2020, Tan was one of the volunteers who organised Mock COP26, an online youth-led climate conference with delegates from 140 countries and which was inspired by COP26. She also gave a talk at Mock COP26 on being an activist living where activism is equated with terrorism. Commenting on Mock COP26 Tan told The Guardian "They're making sure that the voices of the most affected areas are amplified, and making sure that we have a space and we're not just tokenised." She was one of the activists to take part in the Fridays For Future 'Pass the Mic' campaign, also in late 2020, to request that David Attenborough pass on his Instagram account to youth advocates, particularly from the Global South, in order to make effective use of his platform for climate activism.

In November 2020 Tan backed the Climate Live series of international concerts to be held in 2021.

Tan's organisation went into action following the 2020 back-to-back hurricanes in the Philippines to help the most impacted communities, including by feeding the hungry and talking to them about the problems they faced.

=== 2021 ===
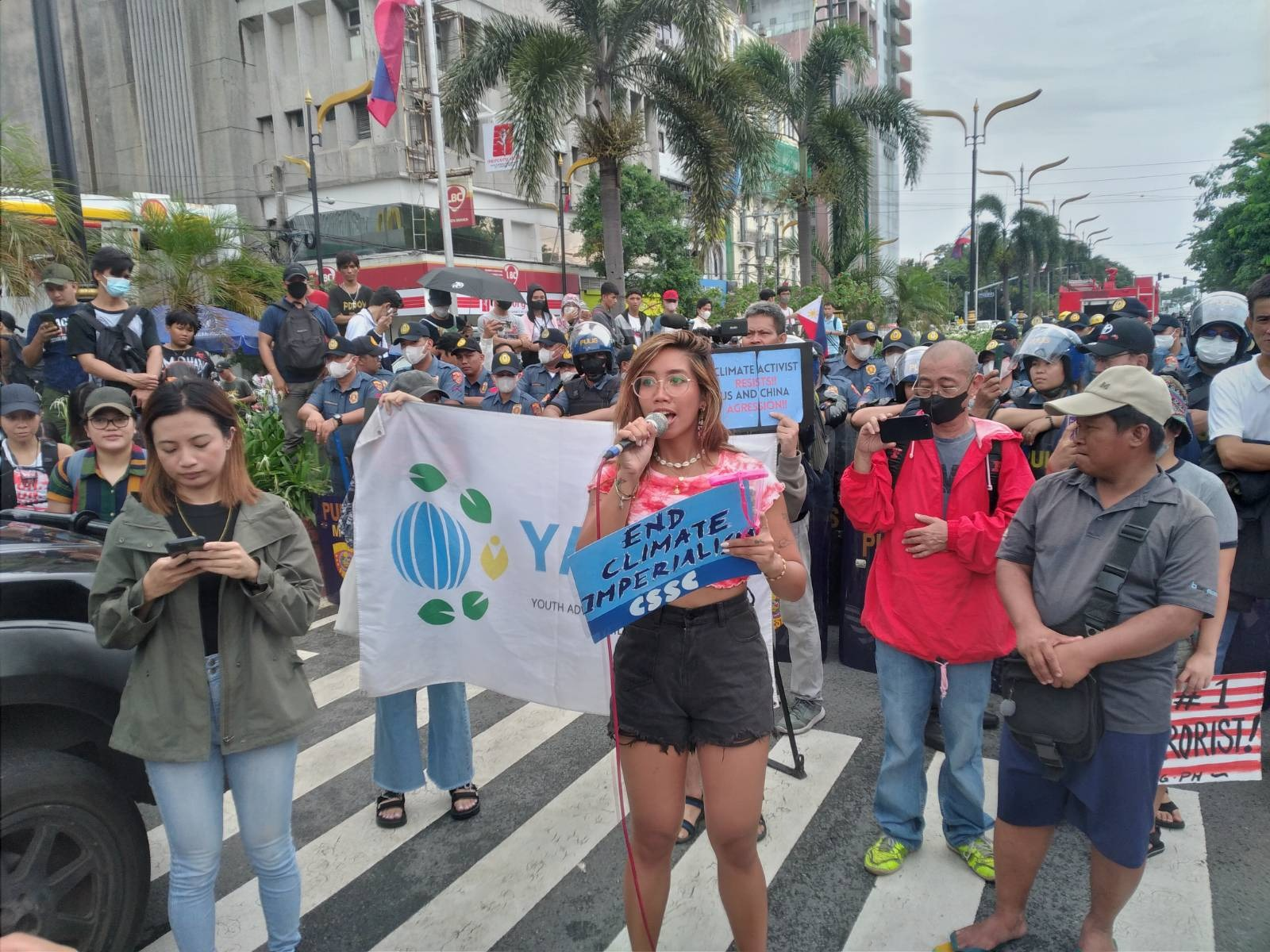
Tan speaking at a rally in Manila, 2023.

Tan is also one of the Fridays for Future activists leading the 2021 Clean Up Standard Chartered campaign of Fridays for Future, a divestment campaign calling on Standard Chartered Bank to divest from companies involved in the coal industry around the world.

At COP28 in Dubai, Tan together with activist Eric Njuguna and English singer and song writer Ellie Goulding, was one of the activists that were convened on the IFRC's ''Reclaimed table'', a table made out of debris from climate disasters, that won the 2024 PRWeek's Global event activation award.

Tan has addressed gender stereotypes and sexism that she faces in her activism, as women are often ignored or dismissed. She has also noted that climate education is typically "alienating, Western, too technical, and not empowering at all," in relation to the approach that she takes as an activist. Tan has also spoken up about "red-tagging," a practice of government officials and supporters in the Philippines where activists and opposition are branded as communists or terrorists, and how it has negative effects on the participation of the youth in the climate movement in her country.

Tan has provided inspiration to others, such as the Indonesian youth activist Salsabila Khairunnisa.

== Education ==
She has led climate action strikes at the University of the Philippines Diliman, Tan graduated with a degree in mathematics.

== Collaboration with other activists ==
Tan along with four other activists from MAPA (Most Affected People and Areas) countries, Eyal Weintraub (Argentina) Disha A Ravi (India), Kevin Mtai (Kenya), and Laura Verónica Muñoz (Colombia) along with Greta Thunberg (Sweden) announced a new wave of climate strikes the 2020s. While announcing climate strikes Tan has called for "annual binding carbon targets and immediate cuts in emissions in all sectors of our economy." She also said: "If we don't act now, we won't even have a chance to achieve those 2030 and 2050 goals that world leaders keep talking about."

== See also ==
- Environmental issues in the Philippines
