= Riz Possnett =

British activist (born 2003)

- Born: 2003 (age 22–23); Cambridge, United Kingdom
- Education: Hockerill Anglo-European College
- Known for: Climate and social activism

Riz Possnett (born 2003) is a British activist involved with climate change demonstrations as part of the UK Student Climate Network and Extinction Rebellion since 2019. Possnett has been involved with the anti-monarchy activism group No More Royals. As of 2023, Possnett is a student at Wadham College, Oxford.

== Biography ==
Riz Possnett was born in 2003. Posnett's parents are South Cambridgeshire District Council chief executive Liz Watts and businessman Robert Possnett, who himself is an environmental activist. Possnett attended Hockerill Anglo-European College in Hertfordshire and Li Po Chun United World College of Hong Kong. Possnett is currently an undergraduate at Wadham College at the University of Oxford studying Philosophy, politics and economics.

== Activism ==
In January 2019, Possnett became an organizer and activist for UK Student Climate Network featuring in various media appearance including CNN and Vice News. Whilst a member of Extinction Rebellion, on 8 April 2022, Possnett and others blocked London's Tower Bridge as part of a climate change protest for four hours, causing major traffic disruption and a great deal of distress to motorists on the bridge. Possnett pleaded not guilty to obstruction of a highway at a court hearing in November. A trial took place in June 2023.

The Times has described Possnett as a leader of No More Royals, a group formed in February 2023 aligned with the anti-monarchy movement in Britain. Possnett and other activists have performed stunts prior to the coronation of Charles III and Camilla in May, notably one performed during a tour of Windsor Castle.

Possnett staged a protest at talk by academic Kathleen Stock at the Oxford Union on 30 May 2023 due to Stock's gender-critical views. Shortly after the talk began, Possnett glued their hand to the floor, wearing a shirt which said "No More Dead Trans Kids", while two other protesters waved pride flags and distributed leaflets. Possnett and the other protesters were removed by police officers after 20 minutes.
