= Salsabila Khairunnisa =

Indonesian environment activist (born 2003)

- Born: 2003 (age 22–23)
- Citizenship: Indonesia
- Occupations: Student; Environmentalist
- Organization: Jaga Rimba
- Known for: Campaigning against palm oil
- Awards: 100 Women (BBC)

Salsabila Khairunnisa (born 2003) is an Indonesian environmental activist. At the age of fifteen years old, she co-founded the Jaga Rimba youth movement, which aims to fight deforestation and exploitation in Indonesia. In 2020, she was nominated as one the BBC's 100 Women Award.

== Biography ==
Khairunnisa was born in 2003 in Jakarta. In March 2019, at the age of fifteen years old, she co-founded the youth organisation Jaga Rimba, which aims to counter deforestation and act as an advocate for the environment in Indonesia. Jaga Rimba is closely connected to the community who lived at Laman Kinipan, which was evicted from the village in 2018 by a palm oil company. The company, PT Sawit Mandiri Lestari (SML), claimed they held the rights to use the land, which the community lived on to grow palm. The company evicted the villagers, resulting in famine, as well as affecting the community of orangutans who lived in the area. Jaga Rimba campaigns to ensure that the indigenous people of the Kinipan Forest, one of Borneo's last rainforests, do not lose their land.

"The pandemic has given us a collective awareness that we are all under the same capitalist and patriarchal system that bases its existence on profit. It is time to unite in solidarity, and lead a green and just recovery.”

— Salsabila Khairunnisa

In addition to her work with Jaga Rimba, Khairunnisa is one of the leaders of the school strike for climate in Indonesia. She is inspired by Greta Thunberg and Mitzi Jonelle Tan. In 2020, she was nominated for the BBC's 100 Women Award.
