= Patricia Kombo =

Kenyan youth climate activist

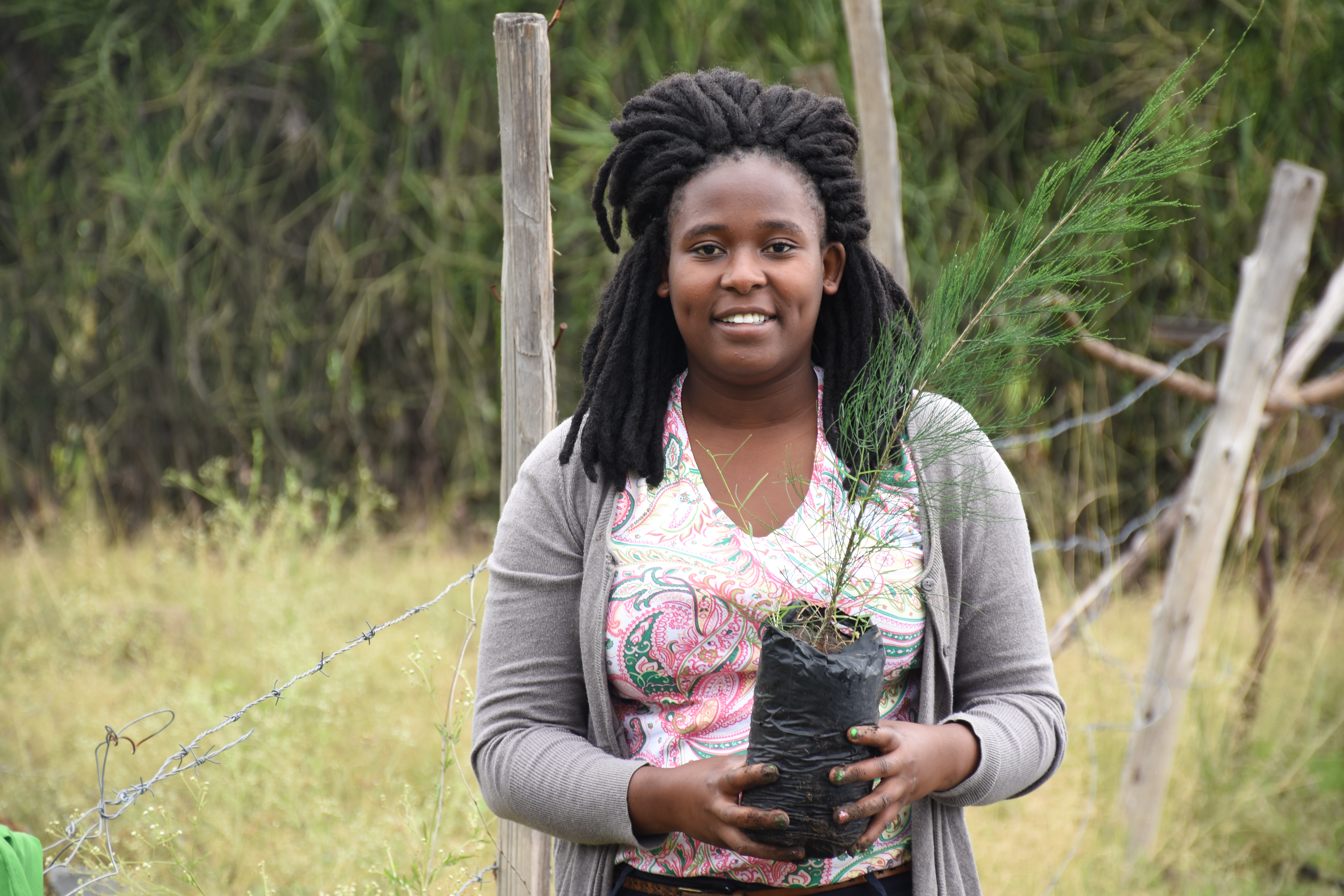
- Born: Mbooni, Makueni County, Kenya
- Occupation: Media Analyst
- Known for: Planting of trees in Kenya and promoting environmental literacy

Patricia Kombo is a youth climate activist in Kenya. She is best known for her tree planting initiatives as part of her nonprofit PaTree Initiative. The initiative has planted over 10,000 trees as of 2020. For this work, Kombo has been named a United Nations Convention to Combat Desertification Land Hero.

== Early life and career ==
Kombo is originally from Mbooni, Makueni County. Kombo studied journalism at Moi University.

In 2022, she challenged world leaders during the Opening session of Conference Of Parties to United Nations Convention To Combat Desertification in Côte d'Ivoire .
