= Marinel Sumook Ubaldo =

Filipino climate activist

- Born: 1997 (age 28–29)
- Occupation: environmental activist

Marinel Sumook Ubaldo (born 1997) is a Filipina climate activist from the Philippines who helped to organise the first youth climate strike in her country. She testified as a community witness for the Philippines Commission on Human Rights as part of their investigation into corporate responsibility and whether the effects of climate change can be considered violations of Filipinos’ human rights.

== Background and education ==
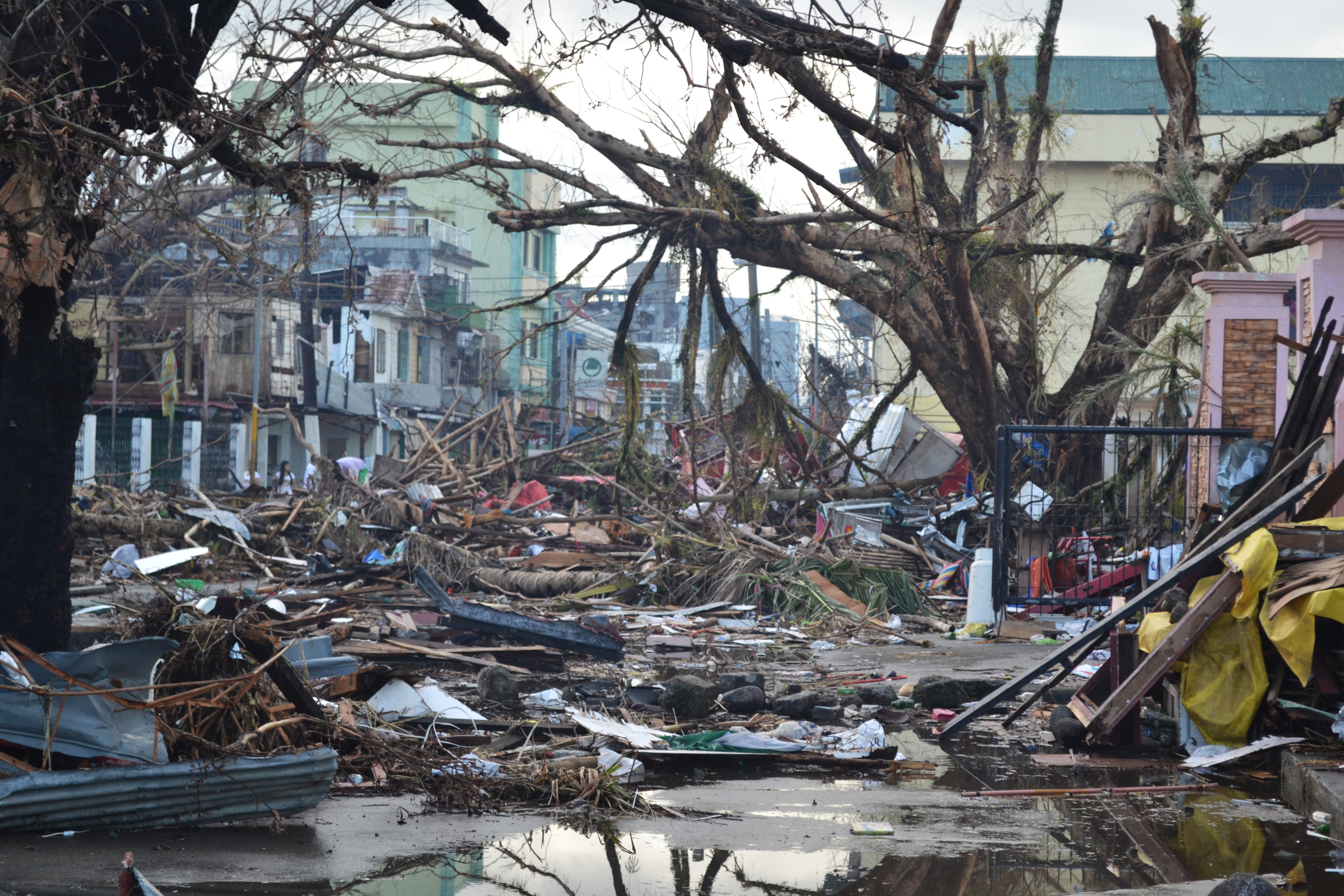
Impact of Typhoon Haiyan, The Philippines (2013)

Ubaldo was born in 1997 from a father who is a fisherman in Matarinao, Salcedo, Eastern Samar.

Ubaldo first learned about climate change and disaster risk reduction in October 2012. She was a past youth leader at Plan International, an organisation that aims to promote children and female rights. In this role, Ubaldo states that she educated local groups on the causes of global warming.

In November 2013, Typhoon Haiyan brought winds of up to 275 km/h (170 mph) and waves of up to 15 m (45 ft), particularly affecting low-lying regions of the Philippines. Over 6,000 people were killed in the disaster and 28,000 injured. Scientists have stated that severe weather events such as this typhoon are being exacerbated or made more likely by increasing global temperatures. Having experienced first-hand the effects of Typhoon Haiyan, Ubaldo continued her climate activism, lobbying governments on climate change issues.

On 2015, Ubaldo got a scholarship to study social work. She studied at Leyte Normal University to get a Bachelor of Science in Social Work degree and graduated in August 2019.

== Activism ==
Ubaldo advocates for a ban on single-use plastics, the reduction of carbon emissions and investment in renewable energy.

In 2015, Ubaldo spoke at the United Nations (UN) Climate Conference where she said, "Please think about us, think about the coming generations who will suffer because you did not make decisions in time". Ubaldo has stated that fighting climate change is the "purpose of my life". In the same year, she also featured in a documentary directed by Christoph Schwaiger. The film was titled Girl and Typhoons.

In October 2019, Ubaldo attended a climate leadership training event in Yokohama, Japan, established by Al Gore. She also spoke at various Japanese universities.

Ubaldo has said that:

First World countries…[could] stop fueling climate change, and change business practices, so your carbon emission could be lessened… These countries should be responsible and be held accountable. It’s so unfair for people, for nations like the Philippines, to suffer from a phenomenon that we haven’t caused.

Ubaldo says that fossil fuel companies should not be allowed to dictate the response to climate change. She says she remains optimistic that strategies to mitigate the effects of climate change can be developed.

On July 21, 2021, she testified in a United States Senate Committee on Foreign Relations hearing called "Combatting Climate Change in East Asia and the Pacific."

== Career ==
Ubaldo is working as an advocacy officer for Ecological Justice and Youth Engagement in Living Laudato Si’ Philippines.
