= Iris Duquesne =

French climate activist

Iris Duquesne is a French climate activist who originates from Bordeaux.

== Involvement in Environmental Organizations ==
On Monday, September 23, 2019, she lodged a complaint against France, Germany, Argentina, Brazil and Turkey. Together with fifteen other young people from around the world, including Greta Thunberg, she denounced the inaction of leaders on the climate plan as an infringement of the United Nations Convention on the Rights of the Child.

She joined in California "Heirs to our Oceans", an NGO for the conservation of the oceans bringing together tens of thousands of young people. She also pays attention to recycling.

She believes that while adults have things to teach children, it's time to realize that children also have things to teach adults. She is a representative of Sorry Children in the USA since 2019.
