= Chiara Sacchi =

Argentine climate activist

Chiara Sacchi (born 2002) is an Argentine climate activist from Buenos Aires.

== Personal life ==
Chiara Sacchi was born and raised in Haedo, Buenos Aires, and studied at Elmina Paz de Gallo, in El Palomar. According to an interview by Slow Food, Sacchi grew up in a family environment where she was always very concerned about healthy eating, and that is why many of her actions as a climate activist revolve around this issue. She has also highlighted in various speeches and interviews that she was urged to act for climate change as she was terrified of the sudden temperature changes in her homeland.

== Activism ==
Chiara Sacchi was part of the historic “Children vs. Climate Crisis” movement, along with Greta Thunberg and 16 other young activists. This was an initiative that asked the United Nations Committee on the Rights of the Child to hold Argentina, Brazil, France, Germany and Turkey responsible for their inaction in the face of the climate crisis. This petition was the first formal complaint filed by a group of children under the age of 18 about climate change under the United Nations Convention on the Rights of the Child.

Sacchi has participated as a militant activist in the Slow Food Argentina network, a global group that works for the protection of biodiversity and good, clean, and fair food. Regarding activism related to healthy eating, she has also participated in Terra Madre Salone del Gusto and in the activities of La Comunidad Cocina Soberana de Buenos Aires, a slow food community in Buenos Aires. She has been outspoken about food sovereignty:

I promote Slow Food principles because I believe that there are other ways of producing food, ones that do not harm nature and humans...Not only are governments not taking charge of fixing and preventing the damages caused by the food system, they are allowing toxins to continue landing on our plates.

Sacchi is also an ardent supporter of collective action:

Every big change comes from the masses, from the people...When I talk about taking to the streets, I’m talking about mobilizing, of creating collective strength.

Known for her slogan “Give Us Back Our Future”, Sacchi is part of a growing youth movement that promotes intergenerational equity in climate action.
