= Hilda Flavia Nakabuye =

Ugandan climate and environmental rights activist (born 1997)

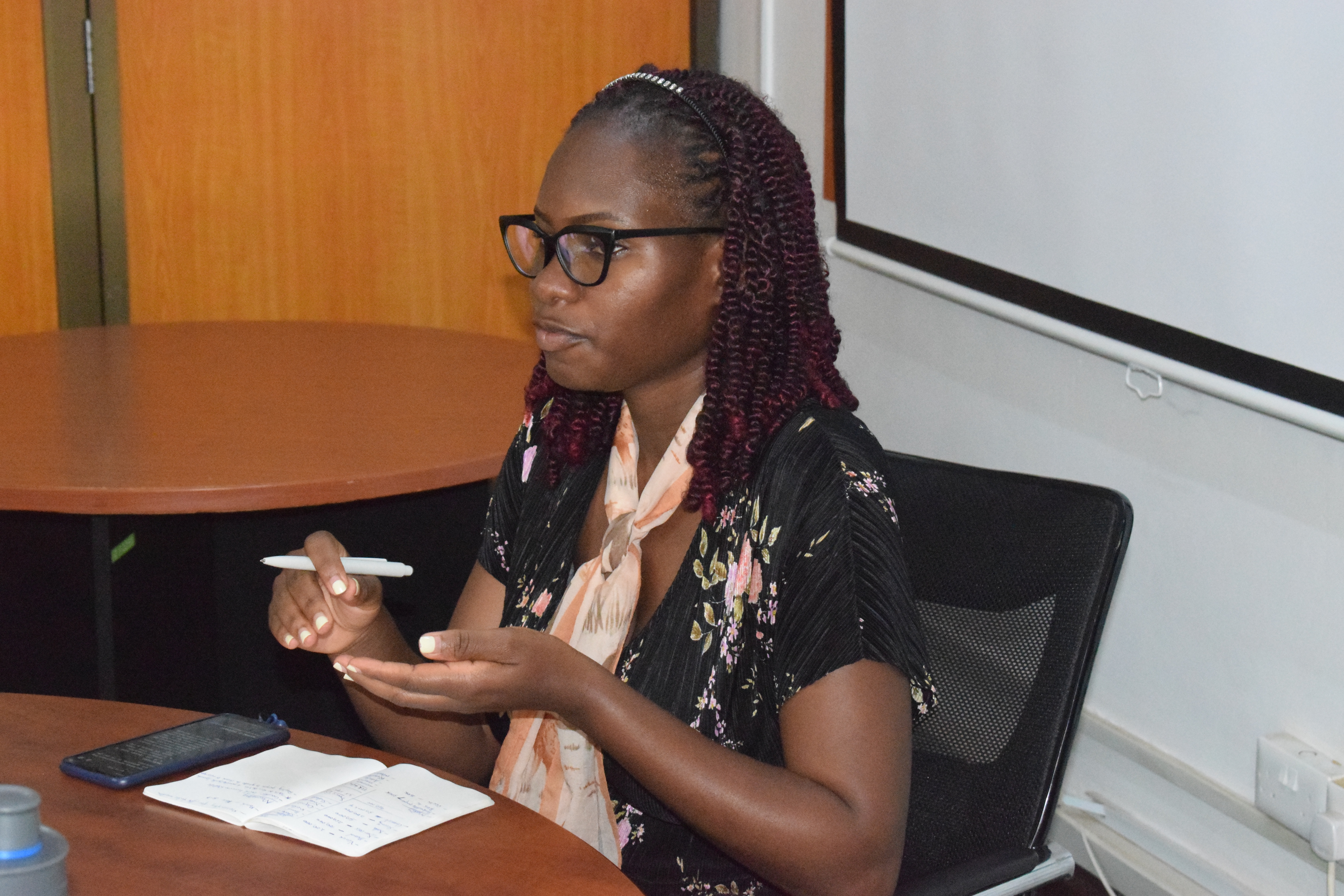
- Nakabuye in 2022
- Born: 1997 (age 28–29)
- Occupations: Climate and environmental rights activist, farmer
- Years active: 2017–present
- Known for: Founder of Fridays for Future Uganda; climate justice advocacy in East Africa

Hilda Flavia Nakabuye (born 15 April 1997) is a Ugandan climate and environmental rights activist who founded Uganda's Fridays For Future movement. She advocates for greater gender equality and racial diversity in the climate change movement. One of her environmental concerns is saving Lake Victoria, which connects Uganda to neighboring countries. As part of her activism, Nakabuye visits schools and communities to empower more women to join the fight against climate change, stating that "the climate crisis has no borders". She also created Climate Striker Diaries, an online platform to encourage digital awareness about climate change.

Nakabuye has been protesting in Kampala, Uganda, since 2017, after gate-crashing a climate dialogue by the Green Climate Campaign Africa (GCCA) at Kampala University. This event made her realize that climate change was the cause of the severe weather that had destroyed her grandmother's farm. She began volunteering with the GCCA as a green campaigner, but soon felt the need for a stronger movement to evoke effective change.

== Early life and background ==
Nakabuye studied at Kampala International University and attained a bachelor's degree in procurement and supply change management.

== Activism ==
As part of Uganda's Fridays for Future movement, Nakabuye and her fellow climate activists are dedicated to mobilizing a strong youth movement to demand urgent action towards the climate crisis. This is now East Africa's largest youth movement, with over 50,000 young people spread across 52 schools and five universities, as well as members of the general public across Uganda, Sierra Leone, Angola, Gabon, Nigeria and Kenya.

Nakabuye has spoken out about the lack of diversity in the climate change movement, stating that "the debate on climate change is not for whites only." She criticized the media after Vanessa Nakate, another Ugandan climate activist, was cropped out of a photo taken at the World Economic Forum in Davos in January 2020. Nakabuye denounced this act as a form of "environmental racism and discrimination," as Nakate's absence meant that the image showed only white activists, including 17-year-old Greta Thunberg.

Nakabuye's climate activism has received international attention. She has been featured as one of the prominent young women striking for climate change by various news outlets, including BBC News, Vox, and Time. On 11 October 2019, she was invited to give a speech at the C40 Mayors Summit in Copenhagen, Denmark, to demand urgent action from the leaders of the world's largest cities.

In December 2019, Nakabuye attended COP25 in Madrid, where she participated in high-profile events alongside Greta Thunberg, joined protests against climate inaction, and delivered a plenary speech.

In 2022, Nakabuye appeared as a panelist at the University of Colorado Boulder Right Here, Right Now Climate Summit.
