= Mock COP26 =

2020 virtual youth climate conference

Mock Cop26 was a two-week online conference attended by 350 youth delegates from 141 countries held in late November 2020. During the conference a treaty with 18 policies was developed. At the end of the conference the treaty was presented to the UK's High Level Climate Action Champion Nigel Topping.

COP26 was due to be held in Glasgow in November 2020 but was postponed because of the COVID-19 pandemic. It was held instead in Glasgow in November 2021.

Frustrated by the postponement of the COP26 UN climate crisis talks, youth climate activists set up a parallel process.

The idea for Mock COP26 came from young people working on the Teach the Future campaign. According to organiser Phoebe L. Hanson "[s]omebody said, 'why don't we hold our own?' as a joke, but it stuck in our heads."

The Mock COP was set up as a virtual conference to run for two weeks, from 19 November 2020 to 1 December 2020. It was attended by 350 youth delegates, aged 11 to 30, from 141 countries, selected from over 800 who applied. To give more weight to the views of those from the global south there were five delegates allowed from each of those countries and three from each global north country. In addition the event was moved to the end of November so as to avoid a clash with Diwali.

The conference was organised by a team 196 volunteer students from 52 countries backed up by 18 student staff and the educational charity Students Organising for Sustainability UK. All of the volunteers and student staff were under the age of 30.

According to the organisers, by holding a virtual conference carbon emissions were reduced by 1,500 times that of face to face COP events. The organisers hope that theirs could be a model for future international conferences that lead to lower carbon emissions.

The president of COP26, Alok Sharma, spoke on the first day of the conference.

During the conference there were panel discussions, speeches and workshops. The issues covered were climate justice, climate education, carbon reduction targets, green jobs and health. Talks and workshops were held across multiple time zones, with delegates grouped by time zone so they could attend around their studies.

With the aim of raising the ambitions for COP26, the delegates voted on a statement to world leaders. With assistance from ClientEarth, an environmental law charity, the statement was developed as policies that countries could adopt into law.

The statement includes 18 policies calling for: a ban on offshoring emissions, climate education across all levels of education, ecocide laws, limiting global warming to below 1.5C above pre-industrial levels, and stronger air quality regulation. The statement was presented at the closing ceremony to Nigel Topping, the UK-appointed high level climate action champion for COP26.
