= Disha Ravi =

Indian climate activist (born 1998)

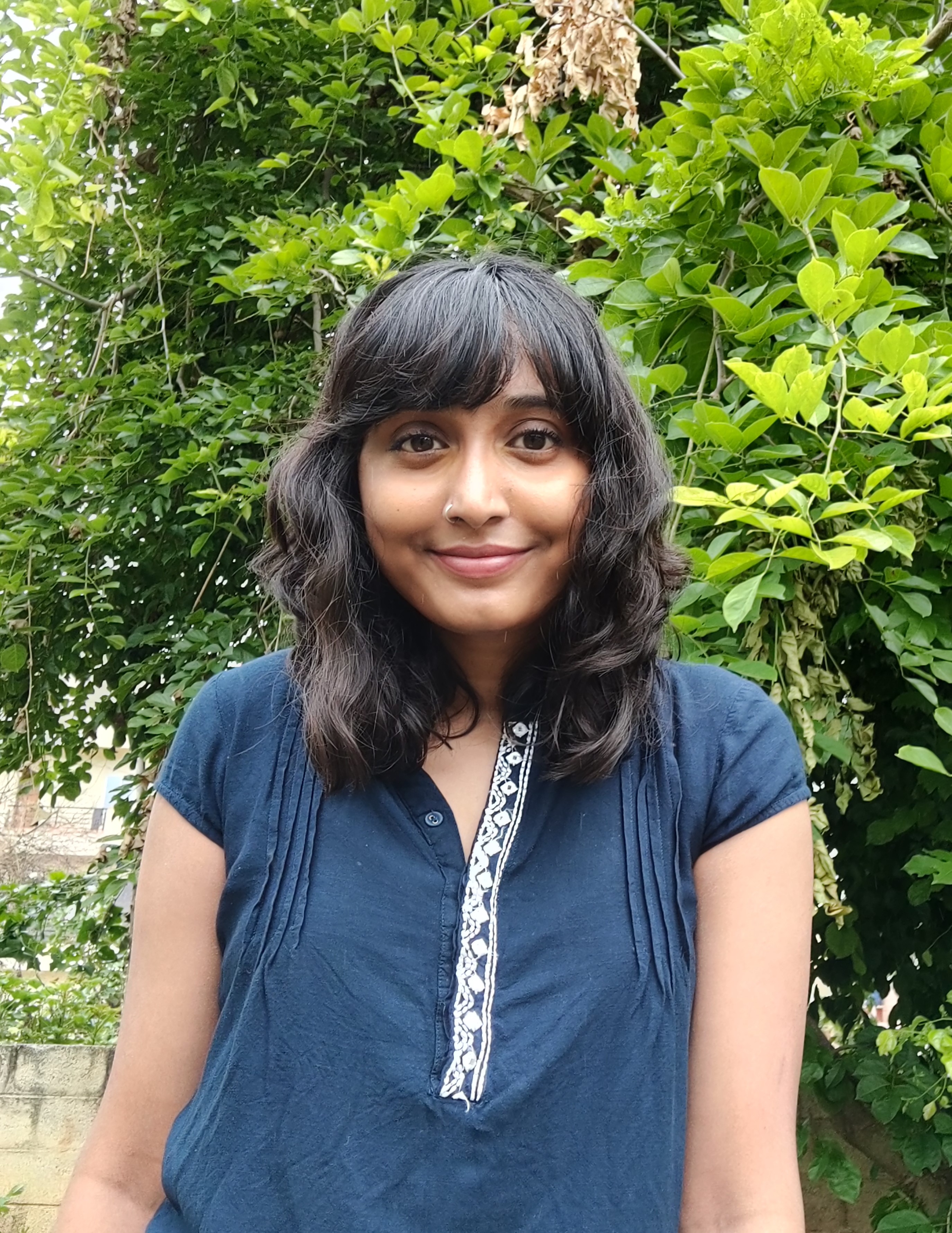
- Born: Disha Annappa Ravi; August 20, 1998 (age 28); Bangalore, India
- Education: Mount Carmel College, Bangalore
- Occupation: Environmental activist
- Years active: 2018–present

Disha Annappa Ravi (born 1998, Bangalore) is an Indian youth climate change activist and a co-founder of Fridays For Future's chapter in India. Her arrest on 13 February 2021 for an alleged involvement with an online toolkit related to Greta Thunberg and the 2020–2021 Indian farmers' protests gained international attention. The Indian government alleged that the toolkit, a standard social justice communications and organizing document, providing a list of ways to support the farmers' protests, fomented unrest and a form of sedition. The arrest was widely criticized both within India, and internationally.

== Background ==
Disha is a youth climate activist from Bangalore, India, and one of the founders of Fridays For Future in India (FFF India). According to The Quint, she is part of the MAPA wing of the FFF movement, and "MAPA stands for Most Affected People and Areas – meaning, countries and peoples of the Global South (developing world), who bear the brunt of carbon emissions and climate change." In an interview with Auto Report Africa, Disha stated, "My motivation to join climate activism came from seeing my grandparents, who are farmers, struggle with the effects of the climate crisis", and "At the time, I wasn't aware that what they were experiencing was the climate crisis because climate education is non-existent where I'm from."

Disha focuses on bringing voices to communities in need and is an author of multiple editorials and articles for international youth climate activists. She was also featured in a September 2020 British Vogue magazine profile of four activists of colour working against environmental racism. On February 15, 2021, The New Indian Express referred to her as "Bengaluru's Greta".

In September 2020, Disha explained, "I'm striking because we're living through the climate crisis. Heavy rains and lax measures taken by governments have led to millions of people being displaced because of floods, particularly in India. My house was flooded last week." Disha told The Guardian, "We are not just fighting for our future, we are fighting for our present. We, the people from the most affected are going to change the conversation in climate negotiations and lead a just recovery plan that benefits people and not the pockets of our government."

In 2020, Disha stated, "FFF International does not have a single goal. Earlier our goal was to declare a climate emergency. The countries that declared climate emergency did not act on it and that is when we decided we wanted climate justice where the government prioritizes climate action and ecological sustainability above all else. We do not have set demands and we want to make different demands work for different countries." In a 2020 interview with US author Gayle Kimball for a book about Gen Z climate activists, Disha stated, "In India, protests are a part of life since the Indian freedom struggle was rooted in peaceful protests. There are a lot of protests on humanitarian issues and religious issues and protests are very ingrained in Indian society. Social media has helped in recent days."

The FFF was being monitored prior to Disha's arrest. Disha was involved with an FFF India email advocacy campaign in opposition to a March 2020 draft environmental impact assessment (EIA) by the Ministry of Environment, Forest and Climate Change. In response, the websites of FFF India and two other groups were blocked in July 2020, but the block was later withdrawn. (Note: In July 2020, the Delhi Police blocked the Indian website of Fridays For Future (currently unblocked) describing the contents of the website as "objectionable" and depicting an "unlawful or terrorist act". The notice went on to read that the contents of the website were "dangerous for the peace, tranquility and sovereignty of the (sic) India.") Disha told Auto Report Africa, "We live in a country where dissent is suppressed ... We in Fridays For Future India were labelled terrorists for objecting to the draft EIA notification. Only a government that puts profit over people would consider asking for clean air, clean water and a liveable planet, an act of terrorism."

She graduated from Mount Carmel College, Bangalore. She is a vegan and was working as a culinary experience manager at a vegan food company before her arrest.

== Arrest ==
Avatar of Greta Thunberg

Greta Thunberg
(@GretaThunberg)
tweeted:

Here's an updated toolkit by people on the ground in India if you want to help. (They removed their previous document as it was outdated.)
#StandWithFarmers #FarmersProtest
[LINK]

February 4, 2021

On 4 February 2021, Greta Thunberg tweeted in support of Indian farmers and in another tweet linked an updated toolkit, saying it was "by people on the ground in India." Following media reports of Indian authorities filing a first information report (FIR) against her (since corrected that the FIR is against the original creators of the toolkit), Thunberg tweeted, I still #StandWithFarmers and support their peaceful protest. No amount of hate, threats or violations of human rights will ever change that. #FarmersProtest".

An activist mentioned that the toolkit was a "routine document used by social justice campaigners to raise awareness about issues and suggest strategies to proceed". It was "meant to enable anyone unfamiliar with the ongoing farmers protests in India to better understand the situation and make decisions on how to support the farmers based on their own analysis." The toolkit suggests action to be taken including "Organis[ing] an on-ground action near the closest Indian Embassy, Media House or your local Govt".

On 13 February 2021, Disha was picked up for questioning from her home in Soladevanahalli, Bengaluru, by a team from the Delhi Police for allegedly disseminating a social media toolkit related to the 2020–2021 Indian farmers' protests. She was sent to 5-day police custody. The Quint reported the arrest is "reportedly based on an FIR filed by the cybercrime unit of the Delhi Police, which was registered against the creators of the 'toolkit' on 4 February." The police said the toolkit included links pro-Khalistani websites. The Associated Press reported the government had "initially tried to discredit the protesting farmers, many of whom are Sikhs, as motivated by religious nationalism."

The police filed a case of sedition and criminal conspiracy against Disha and said her arrest was related to an investigation into farmers storming the historic Red Fort on January 26, 2021; Delhi police official Prem Nath told reporters, "The main aim of the 'toolkit' was to create misinformation and disaffection against the lawfully enacted government." The police alleged Disha was a "key conspirator" in creating and disseminating the tookit, and that she collaborated with pro-Khalisatani "Poetic Justice Foundation" to spread disaffection against Indian state. Further, the police said Disha shared the document with Thunberg, who then tweeted it, and that the police "say the sharing of the document on social media indicated there was a 'conspiracy' behind violence on Jan. 26, India's Republic Day, when the largely peaceful farmer protests erupted into clashes with police." Another source mentioned the police did not allege "a link between the violence on 26 January and the contents of the toolkit, which indeed only talk about lawful forms of protest, including social media campaigns."

International press highlighted the arrest as part of a pattern of the Indian government. BBC News reported "many fear" Disha's arrest is part of a larger pattern of intimidation of journalists and protesters using what BBC News described as "draconian" colonial era Sedition laws. The New York Times described the arrest as the "latest in a series of broader crackdowns on activists" and part of a larger decline in internet freedom in India. The Telegraph wrote that the arrest "comes after Ms. Thunberg and the popstar Rihanna used their celebrity status to support the farmers' protests, prompting an angry response from the Indian government." Time magazine reports on the larger crackdown on dissent in India with Disha's arrest being a part. NBC News reported that Disha "has emerged as a symbol of the Indian government's crackdown on dissent" and her arrest has "renewed concerns of an authoritarian backlash to the farmers' protests that have rocked the country."

=== Reactions ===
Disha's arrest has been condemned in India and abroad. On 14 February, over 50 Indian academics, artists and activists released a joint statement in support of her. Former Environment Minister Jairam Ramesh tweeted, "Completely atrocious! This is unwarranted harassment and intimidation. I express my full solidarity with Disha Ravi." The farm union Samyukt Kisan Morcha (SKM) issued an official statement that condemned Disha's arrest and called for her "immediate unconditional release", and SKM leader Kavitha Kuruganti stated, "it is atrocious that such action was taken because of a toolkit, which is simply something that alerts citizens to what they can do to support the farmers."

Delhi Chief Minister Arvind Kejriwal tweeted, "Arrest of 21 yr old Disha Ravi is an unprecedented attack on Democracy. Supporting our farmers is not a crime." BJP Haryana Home Minister Anil Vij said, "everyone had the right to dissent in a democracy, but 'conspiracy' with foreigners must be stopped" and "called for thorough investigation in the farmers' protest document case." Communist Party of India (Marxist) leader Sitaram Yechury stated, "Modi regime thinks by arresting a granddaughter of farmers, under sedition, it can weaken the farmers' struggles. In fact, it will awaken the youth of the country and strengthen the struggles for democracy." Dravida Munnetra Kazhagam party president M. K. Stalin tweeted, "Shocked by the police arrest of Disha Ravi on flimsy charges. Silencing critics of the government through authoritarian means is not the rule of law. I urge the BJP government to desist from taking such punitive action and instead listen to the voices of dissent from young persons."

Youth-based environmental collectives also issued a statement demanding Disha's immediate release that included, "To imply that climate change activists are a danger to the peace and harmony of this country in a political climate that is highly polarized is to play fast and loose with their safety and security, especially when there is absolutely no proof to back up this claim." P. Chidambaram, Priyanka Chaturvedi, Anand Sharma, Shashi Tharoor, Meena Harris, Siddharth, Claudia Webbe, Bill McKibben, Lucy Siegle, Trisha Shetty, Rupi Kaur, Karuna Nundy, Mihir Sharma, Rahul Gandhi, Priyanka Gandhi Vadra, Jairam Ramesh, Surpriya Shrinate, Kapil Sibal, T. M. Krishna, Kavita Krishnan, and Aishe Ghosh spoke out on Twitter against Disha's arrest.

Apoorvanand, an activist and professor at Delhi University, stated, "[The government wants] to send a very stern message to the young people that you are not allowed to go beyond yourself, if you are a student, you shouldn't get interested in the issues or lives of people that are different from you", and that the government is saying "what business have you to get interested in the farmers lives or lives of Dalits or Muslims. And if you are crossing your boundary and try to establish a contact with them, then it's clear that you are part of a conspiracy." Musician Vineeth Vincent, an acquaintance of Disha, told NDTV that Disha opposes violence, and "Disha is the soft target, she is the person who will be the poster girl - so that the rest of us do not speak up and are put in place", and "My message to the government is - listen to the young people", adding, "There is some sense in what we are trying to say. ... You could have started a conversation with Disha. She is not going to run anywhere ... She is not the kind to run away." Nine-year-old activist Licypriya Kangujam tweeted "This is an attempt to silence the voices of young girls & women in this country. But THIS WILL NOT STOP US from fighting for our planet & future."

Senior advocate Rebecca Mammen John criticised the arrest, stating that the Delhi police had not obtained a transit remand from the Bangalore court and questioned whether the case diaries and arrest memo were examined. The lack of legal counsel for Disha was also criticised. Other legal experts such as Colin Gonsalves and senior advocate Saurabh Kirpal have also spoken against the arrest. The Campaign for Judicial Accountability and Reforms (CJAR), an NGO, described Disha's arrest as "absurd" and an "attempt to criminalise dissent", and said her arrest and detention violated the Constitution and the Code of Criminal Procedure. After reviewing the "toolkit document", former Supreme Court Justice Deepak Gupta stated, "I see that there is nothing in the toolkit on anything with regard to violence or anything with regard to inciting people. I don't see what is seditious about this document. One may or may not agree with the protesters, that is a different matter. But to say that this is sedition is totally not understanding the law."

Disha's arrest was also criticised by Pakistan Tehreek-e-Insaf (PTI), the ruling political party of Pakistan.

Following Disha's arrest, there were protests in Bangalore, Delhi, and Mumbai. Around 900 alumni of Mount Carmel College, Bangalore, signed a protest condemning the arrest claiming that it was an attempt by the government to browbeat Disha. On 18 February, Reuters reported "Ravi's arrest has kicked off a fire storm of criticism against Prime Minister Narendra Modi's government for using heavy-handed tactics to counter the farmers' agitation."

== Court proceedings ==
On 14 February, the public prosecutor alleged Disha was part of a larger conspiracy, connected to Khalistani separatists. Disha denied being part of a conspiracy and denied knowing the group, and said, "I was just supporting farmers", and "I supported farmers because they are our future and we all need to eat." Disha also denied creating the toolkit and stated she had made two edits. During the hearing, Disha was not represented by the counsel of her choice; her lawyers went to another court where she was expected to appear, and then learned from news reports that she had instead been produced before a Patiala House court magistrate.

Disha has requested a court order to prevent the police from leaking material related to the case to the media, including alleged contents of her private WhatsApp chats and alleged admissions and disclosures by her while in police custody. On February 18, the Delhi high court ruled that the plea filed by Disha to restrain the police from leaking information about its investigation will be considered. Reuters reports that on February 18, Disha's attorneys also filed documents with the court stating that she was arrested illegally, and specifically that "The police did not obtain any transit remand", which is the legal permission required before moving an accused to another location, "nor did they permit the petitioner to consult with a lawyer", adding "Surprisingly, there was significant media coverage of the petitioner's remand hearing and the media seemed to have more knowledge about the time and venue of the petitioner's production than her lawyers."

On February 19, the Delhi High Court directed the Delhi police to comply with their affidavit that asserted there would be no leaks, and to ensure that their media briefings would comply with the 2010 Ministry of Home Affairs' Advisory on Media Policy of Police. Media houses were ordered to base their reporting on "verified and authentic sources", and allowed to maintain confidentiality and anonymity of their sources. People associated with or related to Disha were also directed to not publicize information that would "scandalise or malign" the police during the investigation. The court rebuked television channel Network 18, and did not order articles that had already been published to be removed, but reserved the issue for later in the case.

On February 19, Disha was detained in a three-day judicial custody, on the day her five-day police custody would have ended. On February 20, the court reserved its decision on Disha's bail application until February 23; Judge Dharmendra Rana asked the police counsel to show the evidence linking Disha to the January 26 violence or whether it was based on conjectures.

During the bail hearings, the lawyer, on behalf of Disha, stated, "If highlighting farmers' protest globally is sedition, I am better off in jail." On 22 February, Disha was taken into police custody for interrogation. On 23 February 2021, the sessions court granted bail to Disha. Judge Rana stated, "Considering the scanty and sketchy evidence on record, I do not find any palpable reason for keeping a 22-year-old in custody." In the order, the judge said, "Citizens are conscience keepers of government in any democratic Nation. They cannot be put behind the bars simply because they choose to disagree with the State policies." The judge further said, "This 5000 years old civilization of ours has never been averse to ideas from varied quarters. The following couplet in Rig Veda embodies our cultural ethos expressing our respect for divergent opinions", quoting a translation, "Let noble thoughts come from all directions".

== Notable roles and appointments ==
- Co-founder of Fridays For Future India, a youth-led climate action movement advocating for environmental justice and sustainability.
- Co-Chair of the Advisory Council at Global Witness, an international NGO focusing on environmental and human rights advocacy.
- Coordinator for the MAPA (Most Affected People and Areas) network, amplifying voices from communities disproportionately impacted by climate change.
- Global climate justice advocate and speaker, featured in international forums and environmental campaigns highlighting intersectional approaches to climate activism.
- Advisory board member for "Generation Hope" at the Natural History Museum, London.
- Youth Champion of the solar geoengineering non-use agreement

== See also ==
- Climate movement
