= Climate change and children =

Study of the effects of climate change on children

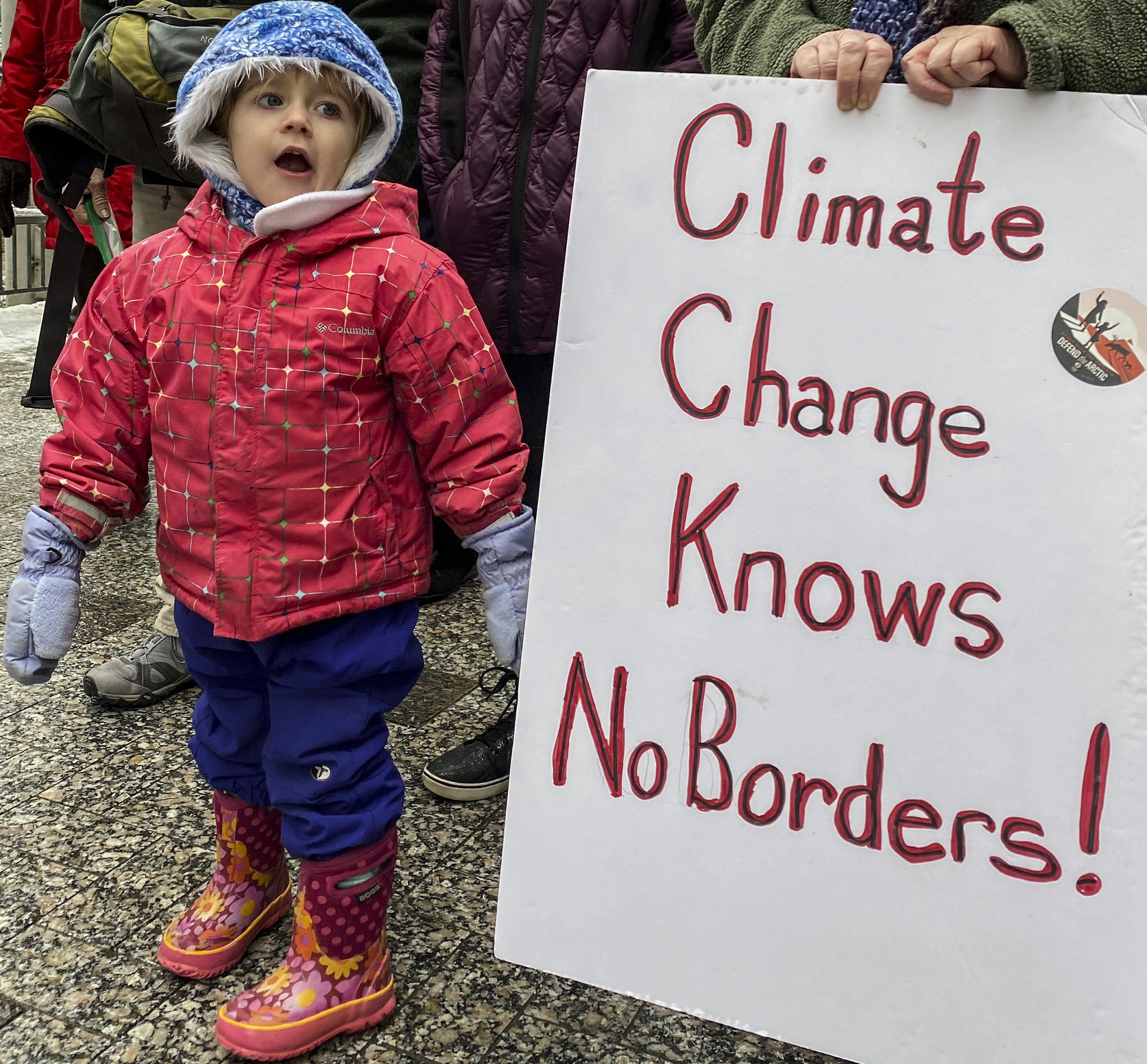
A child at a climate demonstration in Juneau, Alaska

Children are more vulnerable to the effects of climate change than adults. The World Health Organization estimated that 88% of the existing global burden of disease caused by climate change affects children under five years of age. A Lancet review on health and climate change lists children as the worst-affected category by climate change. Children under 14 are 44 percent more likely to die from environmental factors, and those in urban areas are disproportionately impacted by lower air quality and overcrowding.

Children are physically more vulnerable to climate change in all its forms. Climate change affects the physical health of children and their well-being. Prevailing inequalities, between and within countries, determine how climate change impacts children. Children often have no voice in terms of global responses to climate change.

People living in low-income countries experience a higher burden of disease and are less capable of coping with climate change-related threats. Nearly every child in the world is at risk from climate change and pollution, while almost half are at extreme risk. According to UNICEF's 2026 Children's Climate Risk Report, around 1.1 billion children—nearly half of the world's children—are exposed to at least three overlapping climate hazards, and almost all children face at least one. The most widespread combination involves droughts, extreme heat and heatwaves, affecting 296 million children.

== Impacts of climate change on children ==
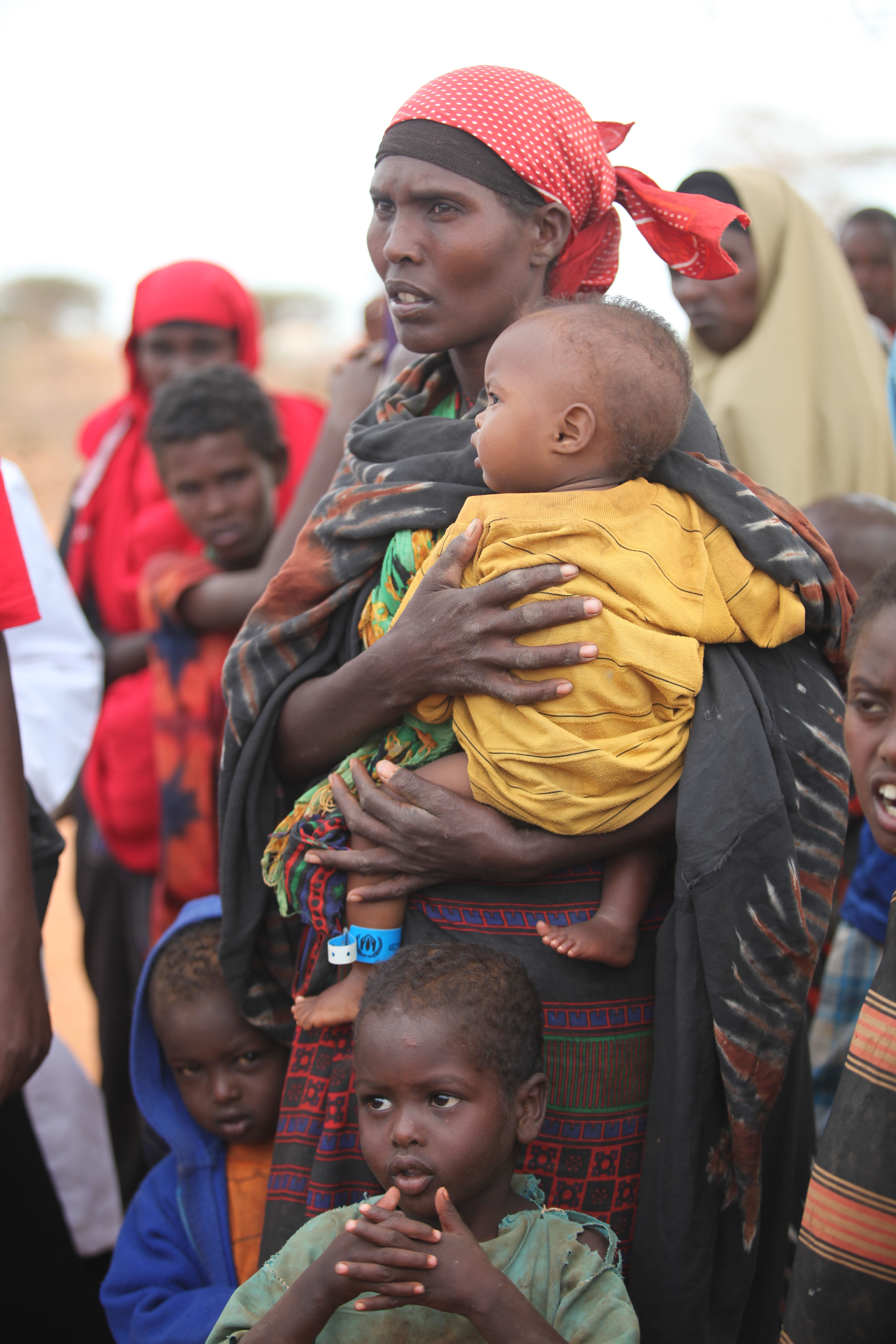
Climate-related famine refugees in the Horn of Africa

Climate change impacts children's futures as well as their present. Children do not have the ability to control their environment and are disproportionately affected by the effects of climate change. Climate change-related disasters have impacted children in recent years, particularly children from poor communities. Children are experiencing diseases, flooding, pollution and water scarcity all due to climate change, particularly in countries of the global South.

Unstable climate conditions created by the use of fossil fuels, deforestation and agriculture decrease access to clean water and food, and destroy secure living environments. Consequently, these systems lead to malnutrition, migration, and poor health, which leaves youth particularly vulnerable. Children are more biologically and psychologically susceptible to these conditions compared to adults due to their ongoing developmental growth. Their systems for detoxification, temperature regulation, and immune responses, and their inability to care for themselves leave them far more impacted than adults. Their underdeveloped respiratory systems are at an increased risk from the pollution caused by fossil fuels.

Children's mental health is greatly impacted by the effects of global climate change. Displacement caused by natural disasters such as floods, hurricanes and fires has a negative impact of the mental health conditions of children. 71% of middle school-aged children and 50% of preschool-aged children that experienced Hurricane Katrina experienced post-traumatic stress disorder (PTSD). The World Health Organization has estimated that children under five years of age carry the burden of 88% of global climate change.

Children are affected by the destruction of homes, threats to food security, and loss of family livelihoods brought about by climate change. The effects on children may be exacerbated by social and economic inequality, armed conflict, and health epidemics. Climate change effects fall under two main dimensions: direct or indirect, instant or postponed. The effects on the child's physical health include death and injuries, heat diseases, exposure to environmental toxins, infections, and other illnesses present within warmer temperatures.

Disasters caused by extreme weather result in a significant increase in mental health and learning issues in children, such as PTSD, depression, anxiety, sleep disorders, cognitive deficits, and learning difficulties. Given this example about the post flood period in Pakistan in 2010, 73% of 10- to 19-year-olds displayed high levels of PTSD, where displaced girls were severely impacted.

Other severe occurrences that were detected were distress, grief, and anger; loss of identity; feelings of helplessness and hopelessness; higher rates of suicide; and increased aggression and violence.

Adding to the physical effects, there are the psychological and mental health influences that are threatening to a child's wellbeing.

== Health and wellbeing ==
Climate change may affect children's health more directly than adults since children's organs and immune systems are still developing and they eat and drink more for their weight. A recent review found that climate change–related events are linked to higher rates of anxiety, post-traumatic stress, asthma, malnutrition, and disruptions in family care among children. However, the researchers note that more work is needed to understand the long-term effects on children’s development and learning. Children's lungs are also more easily damaged by air pollutants since children breathe at a faster rate. Children also face increased risk of pregnancy complications, allergies and asthma, and developmental delays, as well as waterborne diseases.

Children today face three times more wildfires, storms, floods, and droughts than experienced by their grandparents. Extreme events caused by climate change can destroy homes, schools, child-care centers, and other critical infrastructure. Typhoon Haiyan flattened entire cities and towns on the islands of Leyte and Samar, Philippines. Many child survivors of Typhoon Haiyan lost their homes and belongings. In 2020, Typhoon Molave caused floods and landslides that destroyed homes, placing an estimated 2.5 million children in Vietnam at risk. It killed nine and displaced more than one million individuals in Vietnam and the Philippines. In 2025, Hurricane Melissa caused catastrophic damage in the Caribbean, particularly Jamaica, Cuba, and Haiti. The hurricane affected 1.6 million people and approximately 280.000 children in Jamaica alone, as well as damaging and destroying hundreds of schools, directly disrupting education for children.

Climate events have caused severe damage to lives and livelihoods. Typhoons, storm surges, and other disturbances have resulted in the loss of assets and capital and declines in family income among farmers, fishers, informal sector workers, and small business owners. Families with more children are more vulnerable to catastrophic out-of-pocket health expenses. After Typhoon Parma hit the Philippines, there was a rise in school dropout rates resulting from the loss of family incomes. Children who continued with school sometimes had to go to class without allowances to buy food. In rural areas, fields, gardens, fishponds, crops, fishing boats, and farming equipment have been destroyed, while livestock have been lost, affecting food security for entire communities.

== Environmental impact ==
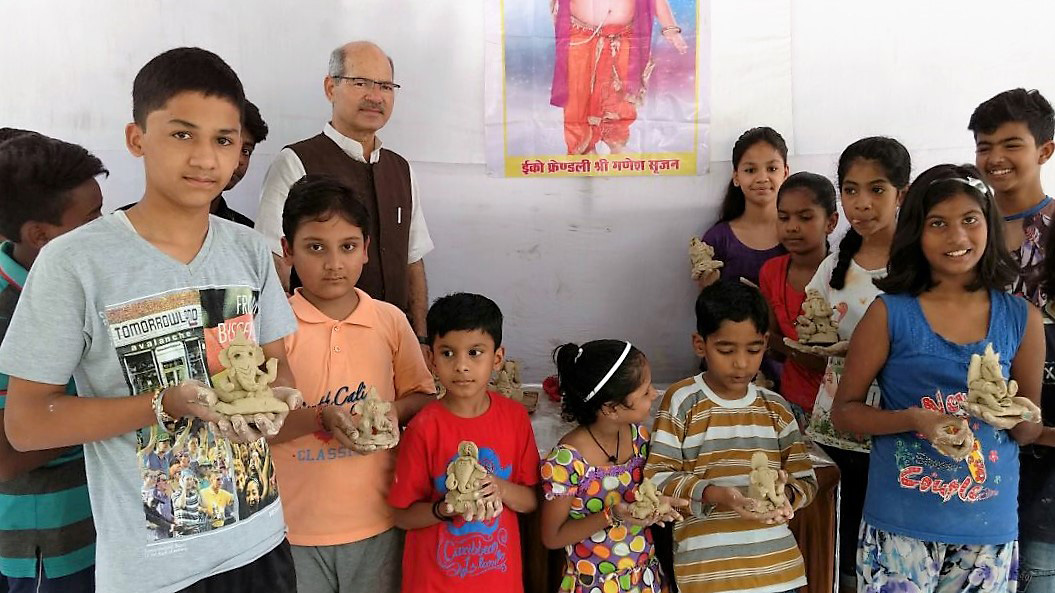
Indian Environment Minister Anil Madhav Dave with the children at a workshop to make religious idols from soil

Children are vulnerable to the lack of basic natural resources that can be caused by natural phenomena like droughts and flooding. Significantly, around 160 million children live within extremely high drought regions and over 500 million inhabit areas with extremely high frequencies of flooding. Natural disasters also lead to displacement of families and children. Extreme weather events may also increase rates of physical and mental health insecurities.

On the global level, children are estimated to tolerate 88% of the burden of disease because of climate change. The burden is exacerbated within underprivileged areas already suffering from environmental challenges. These areas see higher rates of various diseases, disabilities, and a higher mortality rate among children. In 2013, the Intergovernmental Panel on Climate Change assessed that the global temperatures will likely increase by 4.8 °C by 2100 if the current emissions continue to rise. Constant exposure to air pollutants affects birth weights, and leads to a small size for gestational age (SGA), and preterm birth cases. Children exposed to air pollution (ozone, particulate matter, sulfur dioxide, or nitrogen dioxide) tend to suffer from asthma resulting an increase airway oxidative stress and airway inflammation in asthmatic children Air pollution also affects children's neurodevelopment. A comparison of children born before and after the closure of a local coal power plant, found that the children born after the closure had significantly lower cord blood levels of PAH–DNA adducts and higher levels of brain-derived neurotrophic factor (BDNF), a protein needed in early brain development.

== Climate change action by children ==
=== School Strike for Climate ===
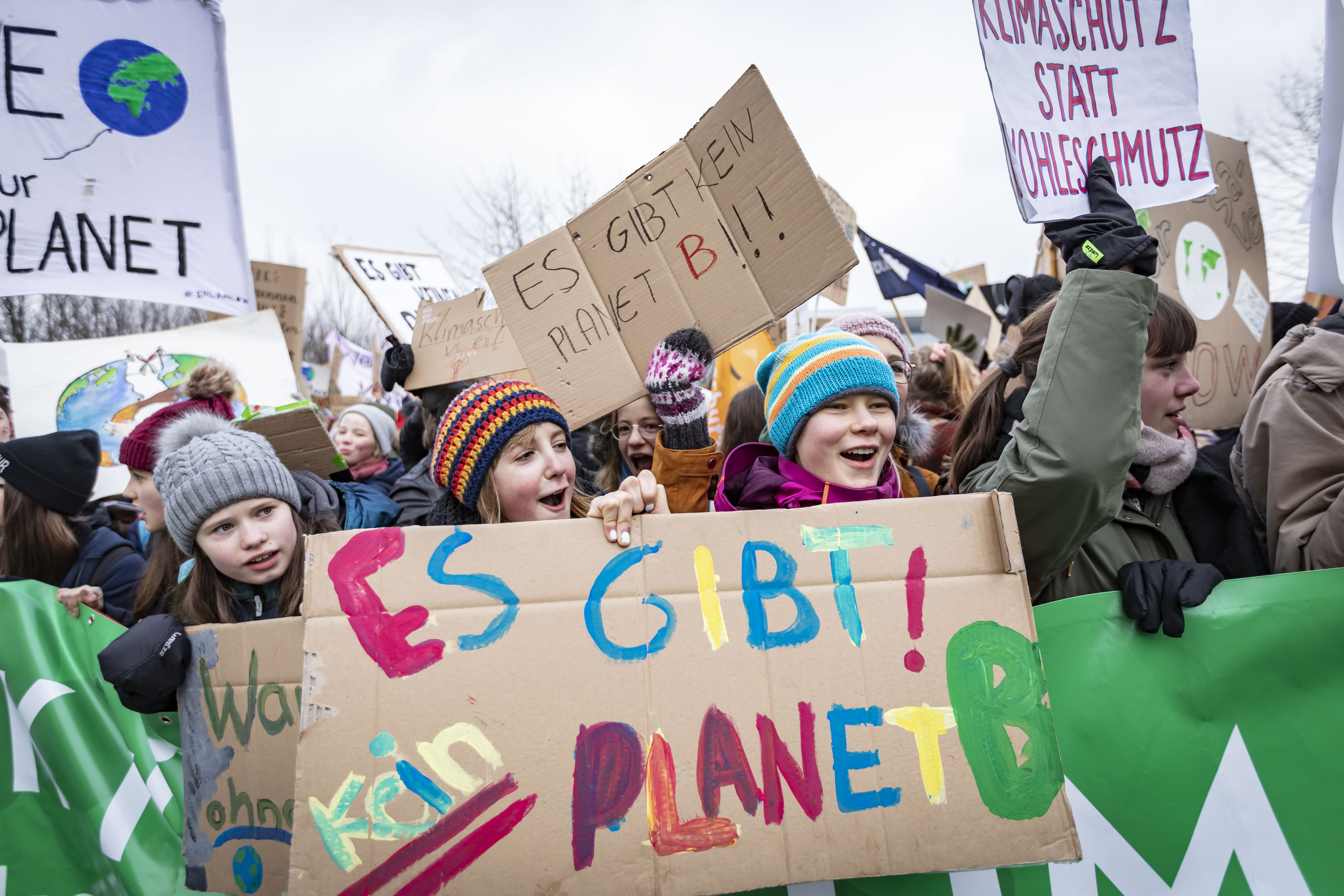
Children at a Fridays for Future protest in Germany, 2019

Fridays for Future (FFF), also known as the School Strike for Climate (Swedish: Skolstrejk för klimatet [ˈskûːlstrɛjk fœr klɪˈmɑ̌ːtɛt]), is an international movement of school students who skip Friday classes to participate in demonstrations to demand action from political leaders to prevent climate change and for the fossil fuel industry to transition to renewable energy. Publicity and widespread organising began after Swedish pupil Greta Thunberg staged a protest in August 2018 outside of the Swedish parliament, the Riksdag, holding a sign that read "Skolstrejk för klimatet" ("School strike for the climate").

A global strike on 15 March 2019 gathered more than one million strikers in 2,200 strikes organised in 125 countries. On 24 May 2019, in the second global strike, 1,600 protests across 150 countries drew hundreds of thousands of strikers. The May protests were timed to coincide with the 2019 European Parliament election.

The 2019 Global Week for Future was a series of 4,500 strikes across over 150 countries, focused around Friday 20 September and Friday 27 September. Likely the largest climate strikes in world history, the 20 September strikes gathered roughly 4 million protesters, many of them schoolchildren, including 1.4 million in Germany. On 27 September, an estimated two million people participated in demonstrations worldwide, including over one million protesters in Italy and several hundred thousand protesters in Canada.

=== Legal action ===
Juliana v. United States was dismissed in 2020 on the grounds that the plaintiffs lacked standing to sue, but a new case has been launched on narrower grounds. In the case Duarte Agostinho and Others v. Portugal and Others brought by children and young adults, the European Court of Human Rights asked 33 states to respond by May 2021 with information on how they are trying to limit climate change.

== Arts-based educational approaches ==
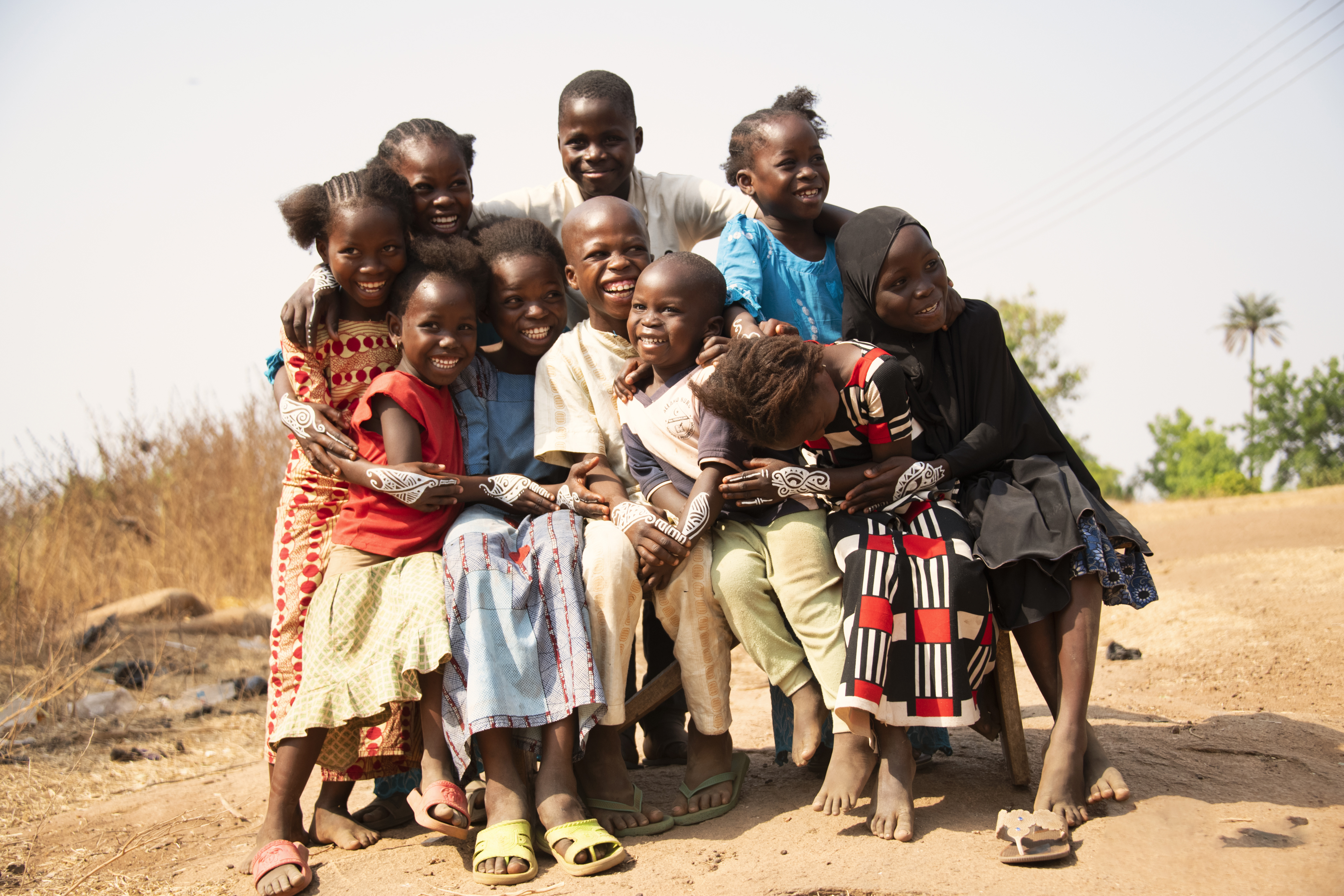
Children following a class in body art

Many schools have integrated climate change within their curriculums. Children who learn about the existence and urgency of global environmental problems, become more aware of and engaged in improving the world's environmental status.

== Global initiatives ==
A number of global initiatives and projects had been launched to address the impact and challenges of climate change on children.

Global efforts towards climate change action
Title	Organization(s)	Type	Year
Global Initiative to Advance Children's Right to a Healthy Environment	United Nations	Initiative	2019–2021
Goal of NCCAP	Kenya's National Climate Change Action Plan	Action plan	2018–2022
Small Grants Programme (SGP)	UNDP, Global Environmental Facility	Grants and projects	2015
Climate Sensitive Humanitarian Assistance	UNICEF	Initiative	2015
United Nations Joint Framework Initiative on Children, Youth and Climate Change	United Nations	Framework initiative	2013
NASA's Climate Kids	NASA	Website	2010
Protecting children's health in a changing environment	World Health Organization	Report	2010
Climate change: Take action now	UNICEF, World YWCA, girls worldwide say, FAO, International Federation of Red Cross and Red Crescent Societies, World Organization of the Scout Movement, The Duke of Edinburgh's Award	Initiative	2003

== Youth activists on climate change ==
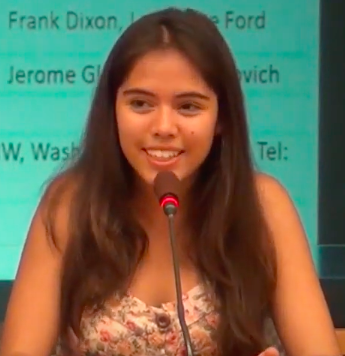
Climate activist Xiye Bastida

Youth activism plays a role in reducing the impact of global climate change on children.

Over 4,500 children and young people have participated in annual United Nations Environment Programme Tunza International Conferences since 2004. Children that represent over 100 countries and have covered a multitude of issues concerning climate change, including green jobs and a green economy. Involving youth in conversations around the climate adds a level of diversity and a shared understanding of how climate change affects different communities and age groups.

== See also ==
- Mari Copeny
- Autumn Peltier
- Xiuhtezcatl Martinez
- Leah Namugerwa
- Ridhima Pandey
- Isra Hirsi
- Yusuf Baluch
