= Effects of climate change =

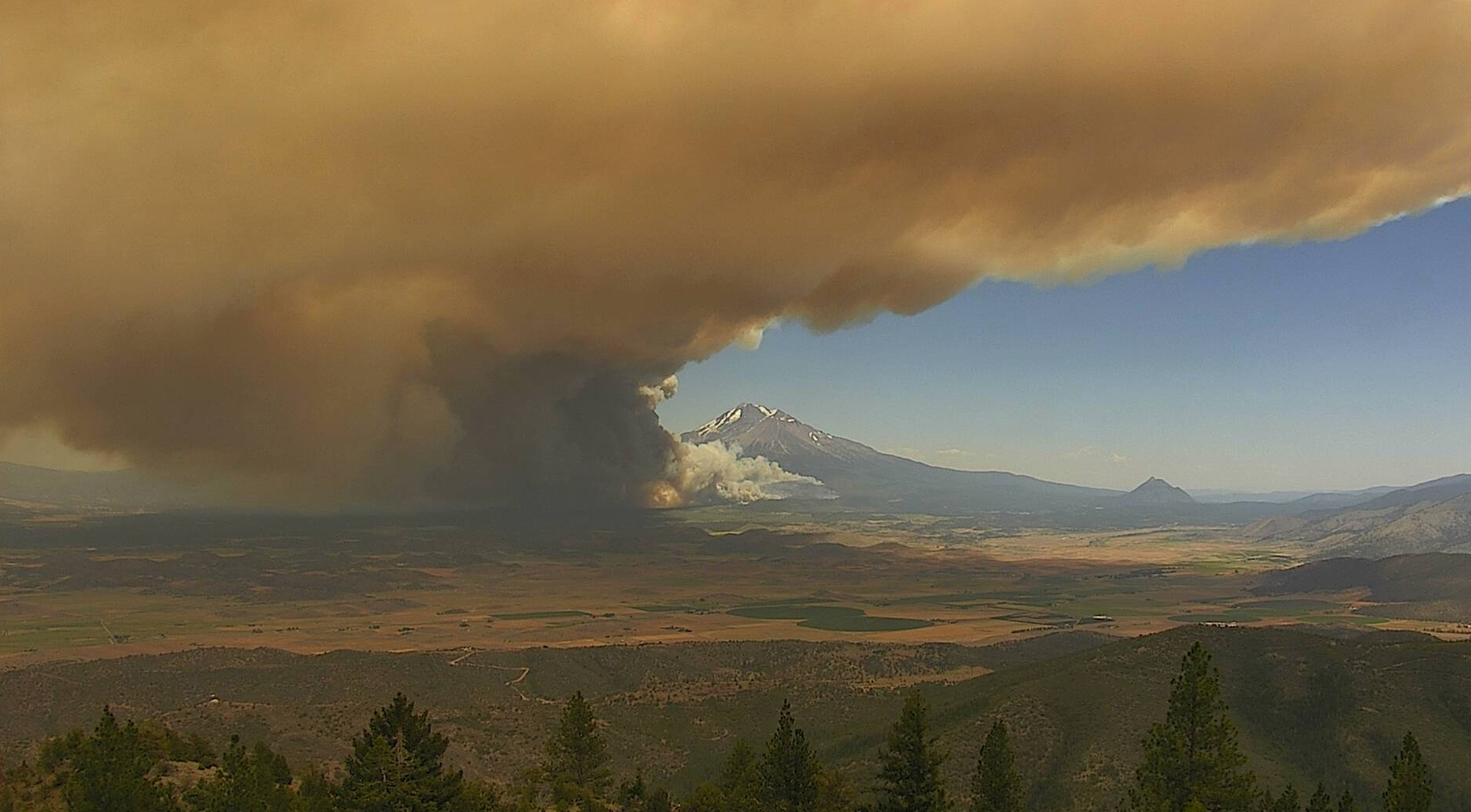
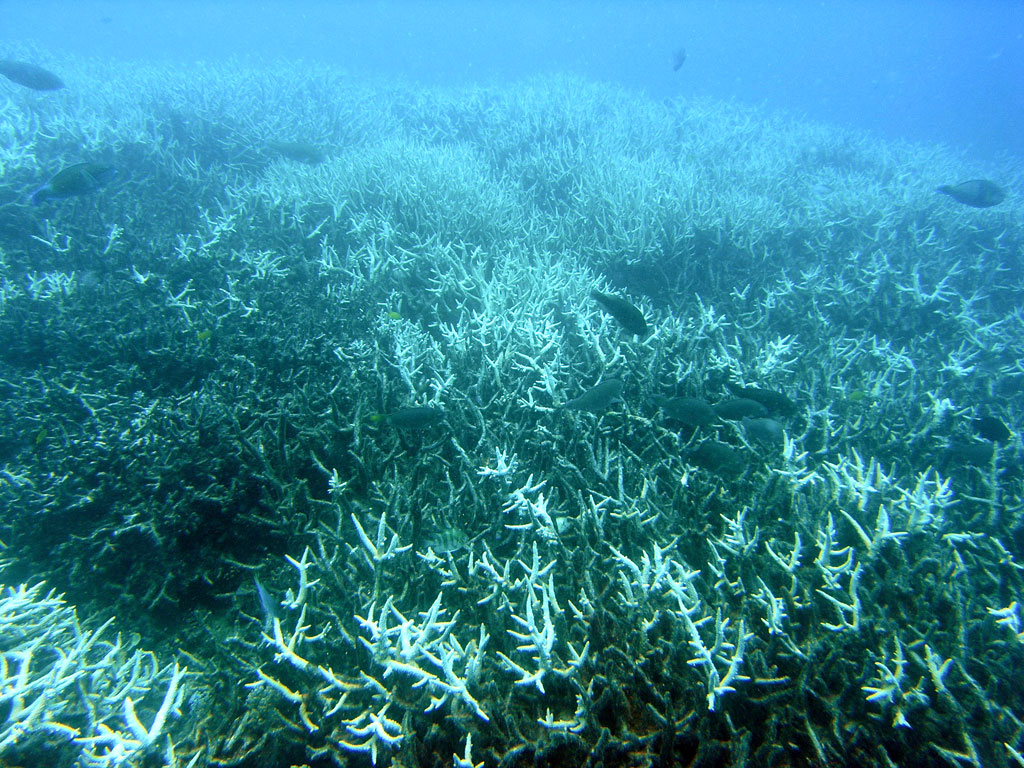
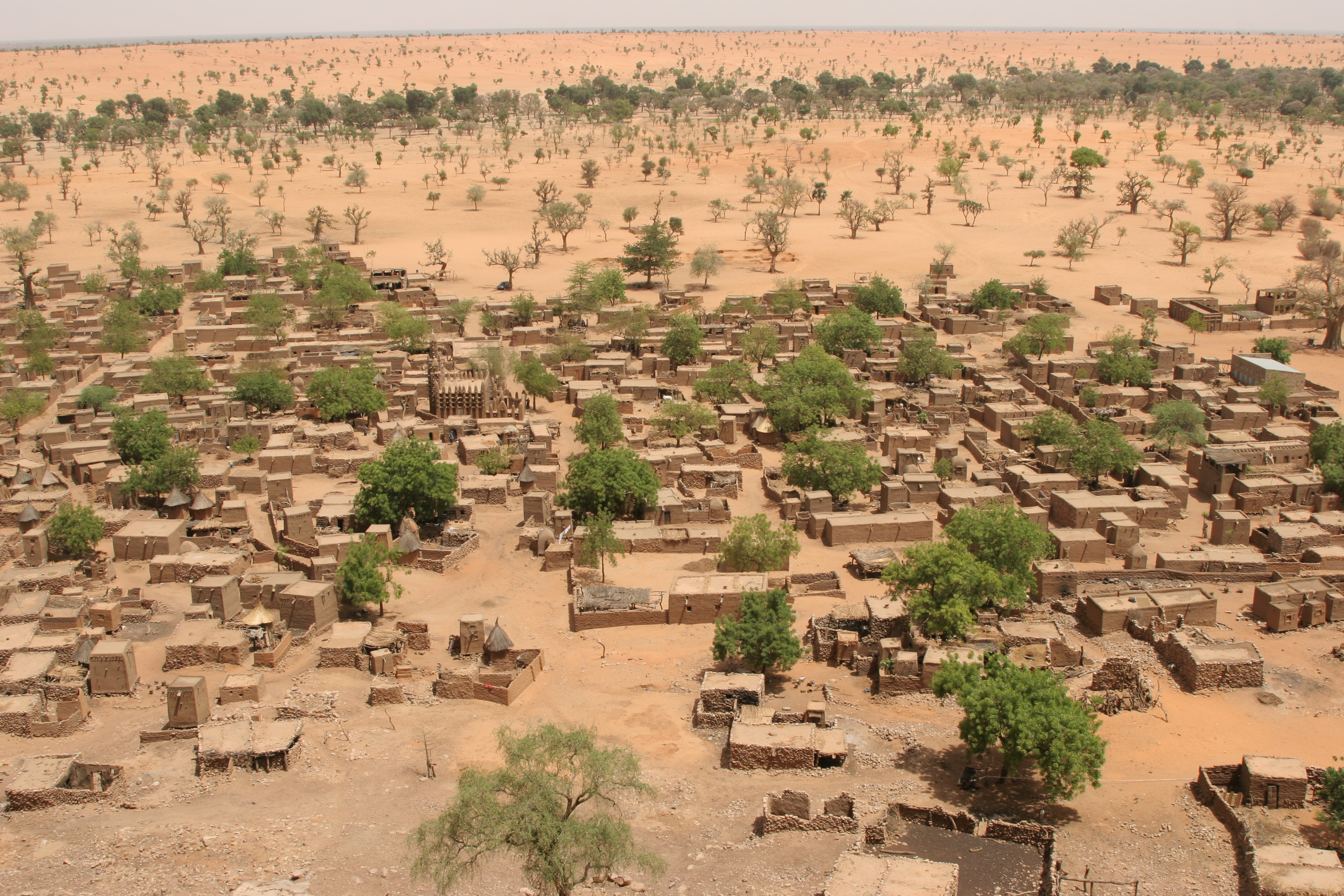
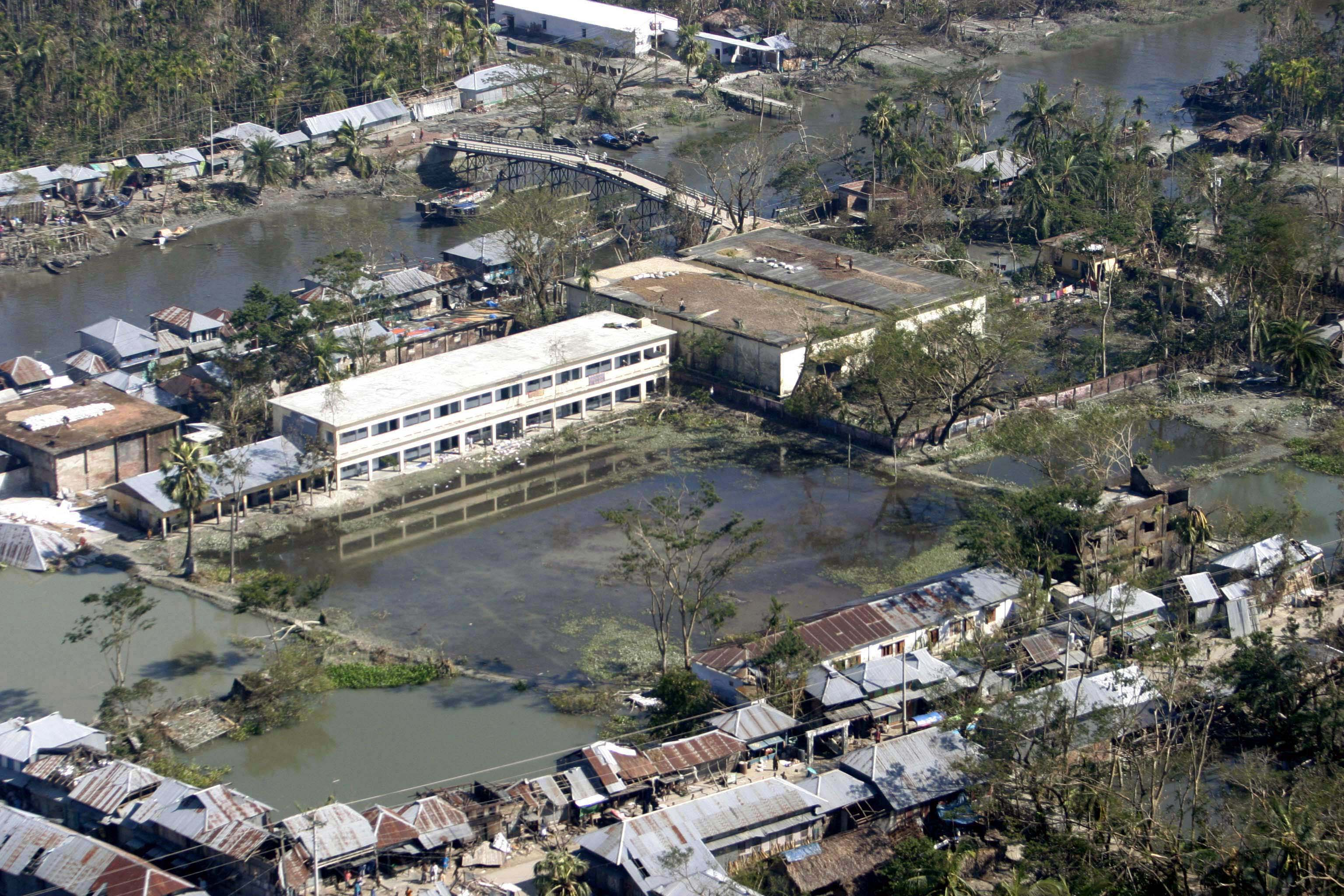
Some climate change effects: wildfire caused by heat and dryness, bleached coral caused by ocean acidification and heating, environmental migration caused by desertification, and coastal flooding caused by storms and sea level rise.

Effects of climate change are well documented and growing for Earth's natural environment and human societies. Changes to the climate system include an overall warming trend, changes to precipitation patterns, and more extreme weather. As the climate changes it impacts the natural environment with effects such as more intense forest fires, thawing permafrost, and desertification. These changes impact ecosystems and societies, and can become irreversible once tipping points are crossed. Climate activists are engaged in a range of activities around the world that seek to ameliorate these issues or prevent them from happening.

The effects of climate change vary in timing and location. Up until now the Arctic has warmed faster than most other regions due to climate change feedbacks. Surface air temperatures over land have also increased at about twice the rate they do over the ocean, causing intense heat waves. These temperatures would stabilize if greenhouse gas emissions were brought under control. Ice sheets and oceans absorb the vast majority of excess heat in the atmosphere, delaying effects there but causing them to accelerate and then continue after surface temperatures stabilize. Sea level rise is a particular long term concern as a result. The effects of ocean warming also include marine heatwaves, ocean stratification, deoxygenation, and changes to ocean currents. The ocean is also acidifying as it absorbs carbon dioxide from the atmosphere.

The primary causes and the wide-ranging impacts of climate change. Some effects act as positive feedbacks that amplify climate change.

The ecosystems most immediately threatened by climate change are in the mountains, coral reefs, and the Arctic. Excess heat is causing environmental changes in those locations that exceed the ability of animals to adapt. Species are escaping heat by migrating towards the poles and to higher ground when they can. Sea level rise threatens coastal wetlands with flooding. Decreases in soil moisture in certain locations can cause desertification and damage ecosystems like the Amazon rainforest. At 2 °C (3.6 °F) of warming, around 10% of species on land would become critically endangered.

Humans are vulnerable to climate change in many ways. Sources of food and fresh water can be threatened by environmental changes. Human health can be impacted by weather extremes or by ripple effects like the spread of infectious diseases. Economic impacts include changes to agriculture, fisheries, and forestry. Higher temperatures will increasingly prevent outdoor labor in tropical latitudes due to heat stress. Island nations and coastal cities may be inundated by rising sea levels. Some groups of people may be particularly at risk from climate change, such as the poor, children, and indigenous peoples. Industrialised countries, which have emitted the vast majority of CO_{2}, have more resources to adapt to global warming than developing nations do. Cumulative effects and extreme weather events can lead to displacement and migration.

== Changes in temperature ==
Over the last 50 years the Arctic has warmed the most, and temperatures on land have generally increased more than sea surface temperatures.

Global warming affects all parts of Earth's climate system. Global surface temperatures have risen by 1.1 °C (2.0 °F). Scientists say they will rise further in the future. The changes in climate are not uniform across the Earth. In particular, most land areas have warmed faster than most ocean areas. The Arctic is warming faster than most other regions. Night-time temperatures have increased faster than daytime temperatures. The impact on nature and people depends on how much more the Earth warms.

Scientists use several methods to predict the effects of human-caused climate change. One is to investigate past natural changes in climate. To assess changes in Earth's past climate scientists have studied tree rings, ice cores, corals, and ocean and lake sediments. These show that recent temperatures have surpassed anything in the last 2,000 years. By the end of the 21st century, temperatures may increase to a level last seen in the mid-Pliocene. This was around 3 million years ago. At that time, mean global temperatures were about 2–4 °C (3.6–7.2 °F) warmer than pre-industrial temperatures. The global mean sea level was up to 25 metres (82 ft) higher than it is today. The modern observed rise in temperature and CO_{2} concentrations has been rapid. Even abrupt geophysical events in Earth's history do not approach current rates.

How much the world warms depends on human greenhouse gas emissions and on how sensitive the climate is to greenhouse gases. The more carbon dioxide (CO_{2}) is emitted in the 21st century the hotter the world will be by 2100. For a doubling of greenhouse gas concentrations, the global mean temperature would rise by about 2.5–4 °C (4.5–7.2 °F). If emissions of CO_{2} stopped abruptly and there was no use of negative emission technologies, the Earth's climate would not start moving back to its pre-industrial state. Temperatures would stay at the same high level for several centuries. After about a thousand years, 20% to 30% of human-emitted CO_{2} would remain in the atmosphere. The ocean and land would not have taken them. This would commit the climate to a warmer state long after emissions have stopped.

With current mitigation policies the temperature will be about 2.7 °C (2.0–3.6 °C) above pre-industrial levels by 2100. It would rise by 2.4 °C (4.3 °F) if governments achieved all their unconditional pledges and targets. If all the countries that have set or are considering net-zero targets achieve them, the temperature will rise by around 1.8 °C (3.2 °F). There is a big gap between national plans and commitments and the actions that governments have taken around the world.

In September 2025, The German Physical society and the German meteorological society published a joint press release, stating that if the current trends will continue, global temperature can rise to 3 °C above pre-industrial level by the year 2050, and by 5 °C by the year 2100.

== Weather ==
Large increases in both the frequency and intensity of extreme weather events (for increasing degrees of global warming) are expected. Extreme heat events are forecast to be among the most affected by global warming.

Climate Central's review of climate attribution studies covered almost 750 extreme weather events and trends, of various event types. The review found that climate change made almost all studied event types substantially more likely or more severe—with cold/snow/ice events being the exception.

Analyzing >250 US cities, all but two experienced fewer freezing days in 2025 than in 1956. In 2025, on average, freezing days began 11 days later and ended 26 days earlier.

The lower and middle atmosphere, where nearly all weather occurs, are heating due to the greenhouse effect. Evaporation and atmospheric moisture content increase as temperatures rise. Water vapour is a greenhouse gas, so this process is a self-reinforcing feedback.

The excess water vapour also gets caught up in storms. This makes them more intense, larger, and potentially longer-lasting. This in turn causes rain and snow events to become stronger and leads to increased risk of flooding. Extra drying worsens natural dry spells and droughts. This increases risk of heat waves and wildfires. Scientists have identified human activities as the cause of recent climate trends. They are now able to estimate the impact of climate change on extreme weather events using a process called extreme event attribution. For instance such research can look at historical data for a region and conclude that a specific heat wave was more intense due to climate change. In addition, the time shifts of the season onsets, changes in the length of the season durations have been reported in many regions of the world. As a result of changes in climatic patterns and rising global temperatures, extreme weather events like heatwaves and heavy precipitation are occurring more frequently and with increasing severity.

=== Heat waves and temperature extremes ===
New high temperature records have outpaced new low temperature records on a growing portion of Earth's surface.

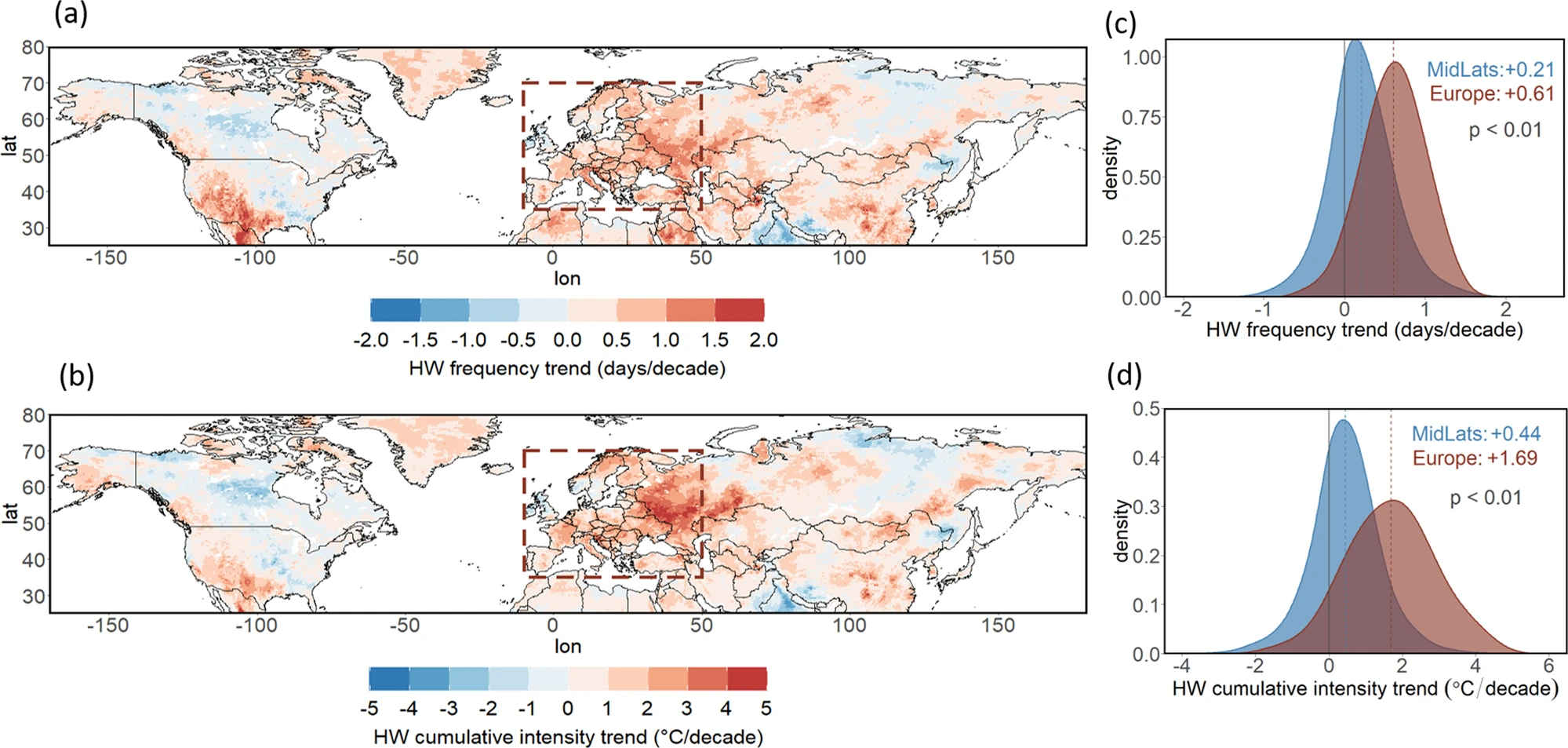
Map of increasing heatwave trends (frequency and cumulative intensity) over the midlatitudes and Europe, July–August 1979–2020

US heat waves have increased in frequency, average duration, and intensity.

Also, heat wave seasons have grown in length.

Over decades, the average number of days spent in heat waves in the U.S. annually has increased, based on increases in both the average annual number of heat waves and on their average durations.

Heat storms—generally defined as heat waves of long duration and covering wide areas—have increased in recent decades, under one definition growing from five per year in the 1960s to 102 per year in the 2020s through September 2026. Spikes in heat storms have often followed within months after El Niño events.

Heatwaves over land have become more frequent and more intense in almost all world regions since the 1950s, due to climate change. Heat waves are more likely to occur simultaneously with droughts. Marine heatwaves are twice as likely as they were in 1980. Climate change will lead to more very hot days and fewer very cold days. There are fewer cold waves.

Experts can often attribute the intensity of individual heat waves to global warming. Some extreme events would have been nearly impossible without human influence on the climate system. A heatwave that would occur once every ten years before global warming started now occurs 2.8 times as often. Under further warming, heatwaves are set to become more frequent. An event that would occur every ten years would occur every other year if global warming reaches 2 °C (3.6 °F).

Heat stress is related to temperature. It also increases if humidity is higher. The wet-bulb temperature measures both temperature and humidity. Humans cannot adapt to a wet-bulb temperature above 35 °C (95 °F). This heat stress can kill people. If global warming is kept below 1.5 or 2 °C (2.7 or 3.6 °F), it will probably be possible to avoid this deadly heat and humidity in most of the tropics. But there may still be negative health impacts.

There is some evidence climate change is leading to a weakening of the polar vortex. This would make the jet stream more wavy. This would lead to outbursts of very cold winter weather across parts of Eurasia and North America and incursions of very warm air into the Arctic. Some studies found a weakening of the AMOC by about 15% since 1950, causing cooling in the North Atlantic and warming in the Gulf Stream region. Climate change is expected to weaken AMOC in all emissions scenarios and, in some high emissions scenarios, can bring it to collapse. This can result in cooling of some parts of Europe by up to 30 degrees and warming in the southern hemisphere.

=== Rain ===
Warming increases global average precipitation. Precipitation is when water vapour condenses out of clouds, such as rain and snow. Higher temperatures increase evaporation and surface drying. As the air warms it can hold more water. For every degree Celsius it can hold 7% more water vapour. Scientists have observed changes in the amount, intensity, frequency, and type of precipitation. Overall, climate change is causing longer hot dry spells, broken by more intense rainfall.

Climate change has increased contrasts in rainfall amounts between wet and dry seasons. Wet seasons are getting wetter and dry seasons are getting drier. In the northern high latitudes, warming has also caused an increase in the amount of snow and rain. In the Southern Hemisphere, the rain associated with the storm tracks has shifted south. Changes in monsoons vary a lot. More monsoon systems are becoming wetter than drier. In Asia summer monsoons are getting wetter. The West African monsoon is getting wetter over the central Sahel, and drier in the far western Sahel.

=== Extreme storms ===
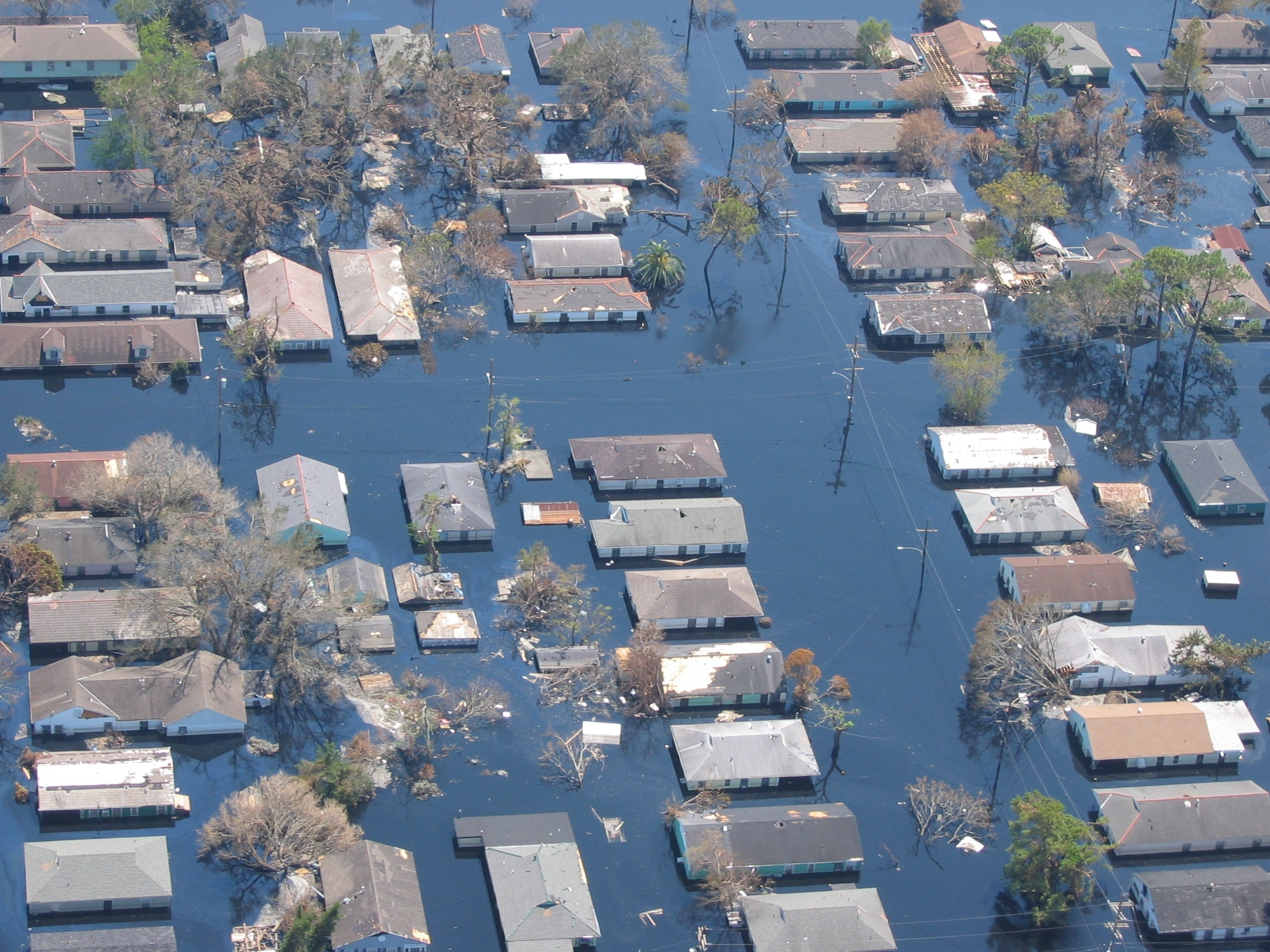
New Orleans submerged after Hurricane Katrina, September 2005

Water temperature increases caused by climate change intensified peak wind speeds in all 2024 Atlantic hurricanes.

Storms become wetter under climate change. These include tropical cyclones and extratropical cyclones. Both the maximum and mean rainfall rates increase. This more extreme rainfall is also true for thunderstorms in some regions. Furthermore, tropical cyclones and storm tracks are moving towards the poles. This means some regions will see large changes in maximum wind speeds. Scientists expect there will be fewer tropical cyclones, but they expect their strength to increase. There has probably been an increase in the number of tropical cyclones that intensify rapidly. Meteorological and seismological data indicate a widespread increase in wind-driven global ocean wave energy in recent decades that has been attributed to an increase in storm intensity over the oceans due to climate change. Atmospheric turbulence dangerous for aviation (hard to predict or that cannot be avoided by flying higher) probably increases due to climate change.

== Land ==
The sixth IPCC Assessment Report included projections of changes in average soil moisture.

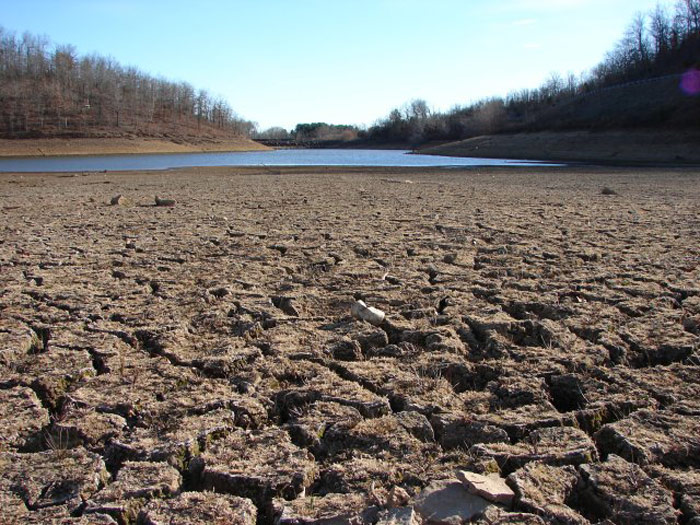
A dry lakebed in California In 2022, the state was experiencing its most serious drought in 1,200 years, worsened by climate change.

=== Floods ===
Due to an increase in heavy rainfall events, floods are likely to become more severe when they do occur. The interactions between rainfall and flooding are complex. There are some regions in which flooding is expected to become rarer. This depends on several factors. These include changes in rain and snowmelt, but also soil moisture. Climate change leaves soils drier in some areas, so they may absorb rainfall more quickly. This leads to less flooding. Dry soils can also become harder. In this case heavy rainfall runs off into rivers and lakes. This increases risks of flooding.

=== Droughts ===
In Southwestern North American megadrought starting about the year 2000, the water level of Lake Powell declined from near maximum capacity to within 30 feet (9.1 m) of the minimum level needed for Glen Canyon Dam to generate electricity.

Climate change affects many factors associated with droughts. These include how much rain falls and how fast the rain evaporates again. Warming over land increases the severity and frequency of droughts around much of the world. In some tropical and subtropical regions of the world, there will probably be less rain due to global warming. This will make them more prone to drought. Droughts are set to worsen in many regions of the world. These include Central America, the Amazon and south-western South America. They also include West and Southern Africa. The Mediterranean and south-western Australia are also some of these regions.

Higher temperatures increase evaporation. This dries the soil and increases plant stress. Agriculture suffers as a result. This means even regions where overall rainfall is expected to remain relatively stable will experience these impacts. These regions include central and northern Europe. Without climate change mitigation, around one third of land areas are likely to experience moderate or more severe drought by 2100. Due to global warming droughts are more frequent and intense than in the past.

Several social factors may worsen the impact of droughts. These are increased water demand, population growth and urban expansion in many areas. Land restoration techniques, such as agroforestry, can help reduce the impact of droughts.

=== Wildfires ===
A study published in June 2024 concluded that the frequency and intensity of extreme fire events more than doubled from 2003 to 2023. Extreme fire events have an outsized effect on the Earth system, even if area burned decreases.

Wildfire disasters (those claiming at least 10 lives or affecting over 100 people) have increased substantially in recent decades. Climate change intensifies heatwaves and droughts that dry vegetation, which in turn fuels wildfires.

Globally, wildfires and deforestation have reduced forests' net absorption of greenhouse gases, reducing their effectiveness at mitigating climate change. Global warming increases forest fires that release more greenhouse gases, creating a feedback loop that causes more warming.

Over recent decades, "forest disturbance" (damage) by fire has increased in most of the planet's forest zones. The increase in area, frequency, and severity of forest fires creates a positive feedback that increases global warming.

Climate change promotes fire weather, which makes wildfires more likely.

Climate change can also increase the main natural ignition source of wildfire, lightning, and thereby increase the number of fires.

In some areas, an increase of wildfires has been attributed directly to climate change. Evidence from Earth's past also shows more fire in warmer periods. Climate change increases evapotranspiration. This can cause vegetation and soils to dry out. When a fire starts in an area with very dry vegetation, it can spread rapidly. Higher temperatures can also lengthen the fire season. This is the time of year in which severe wildfires are most likely, particularly in regions where snow is disappearing.

Weather conditions are raising the risks of wildfires. But the total area burnt by wildfires has decreased. This is mostly because savanna has been converted to cropland, so there are fewer trees to burn. Prescribed burning is an indigenous practice in the US and Australia. It can reduce wildfire burning.

The carbon released from wildfires adds to carbon dioxide in Earth's atmosphere and therefore contributes to the greenhouse effect. Climate models do not yet fully reflect this climate change feedback.

=== Seismic and volcanic activity ===
In regions sensitive to climate change the frequency and intensity of eruptions will change as global warming increases. Glacier retreat and stronger precipitation can increase the chances for an eruption. As of 2024, government agencies are already addressing these changes and scientists are working to map the volcanoes most sensitive to climate change. The concerns regions are where glaciers are melting fast, and there are volcanoes heavily affected by precipitation. 716 volcanoes worldwide, may be affected by more extreme precipitation. Melting ice and extreme rainfall also increase secondary hazards, particularly lahars and disturb eruption forecasting by inducing ground displacements.

Earthquakes can be triggered by changes in the amount of stress on a fault in the Earth's crust. Strong rain, snow, drought and more pumping of groundwater by humans during droughts, can do it by increasing or reducing the weight of water on some pieces of the Earth's crust. So, as climate change will cause more extreme weather, it can induce more earthquakes. Glacier retreat reduce stress loads on Earth's crust underneath, creating glacial earthquakes. Glacial earthquakes in Greenland for example, peak in frequency in the summer months and are increasing over time, possibly in response to global warming.

Sea level rise can also create pressure on tectonic faults, increasing risk for earthquakes.

In Greenland, melting glaciers triggered a landslide, which caused a mega-tsunami in September 2023. Earthquake sensors around the world detected the resulting vibration, but the scale and duration of the event was unprecedented, so at first scientists failed to understand it. Further investigation revealed that the cause was the collapse of a 1,200-metre-high mountain peak into the remote Dickson Fjord on September 16, 2023, after the glacier below the mountain melted to a sufficient degree. The collapse into the fjord, in turn, launched a wave 200 metres high, which caused repeated movement of water back and forth in the fjord, generating seismic waves that were detectable worldwide for nine days.

== Oceans ==
Oceans have taken up almost 90% of the excess heat accumulated on Earth due to global warming.

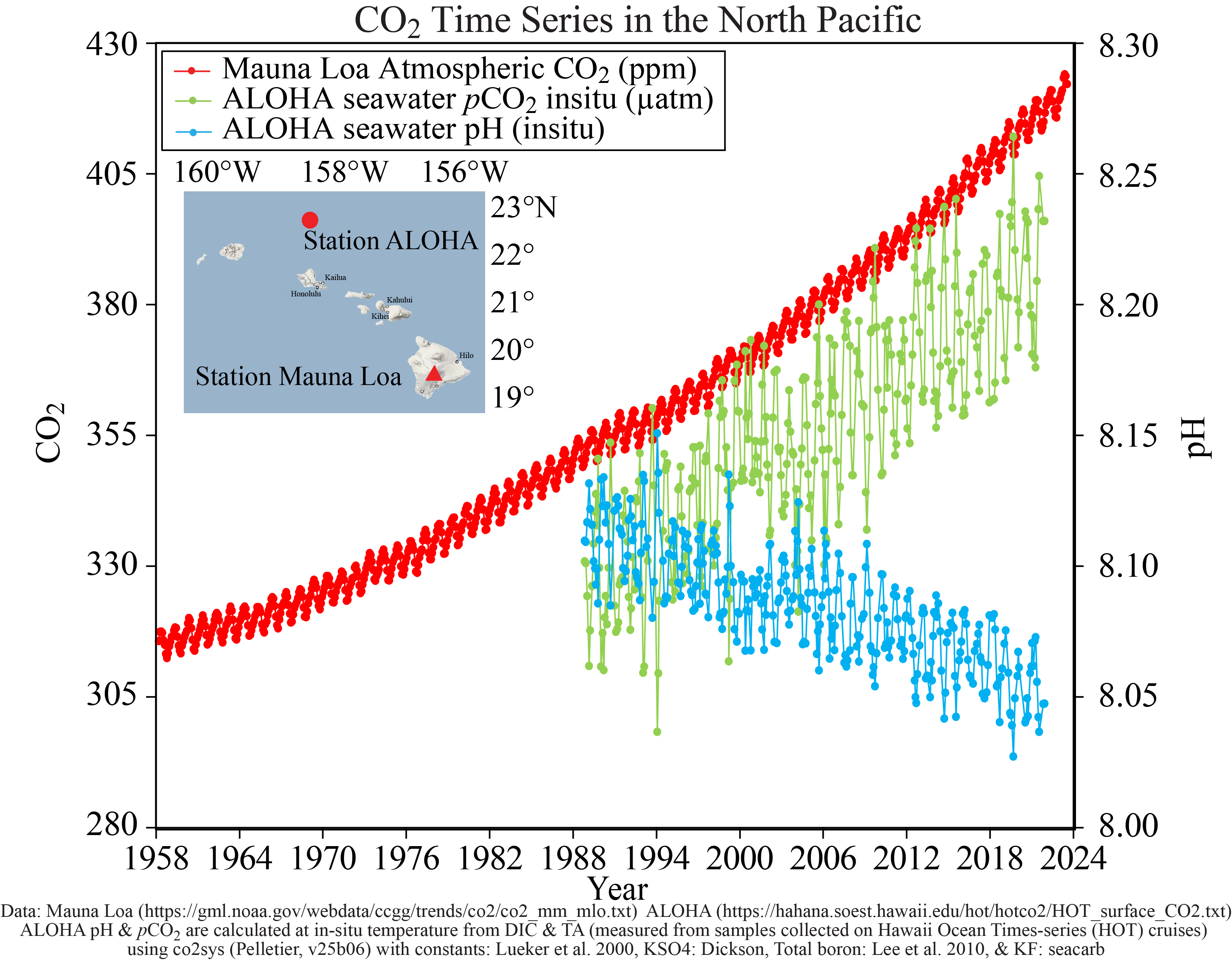
Climate change causes a drop in the ocean's pH value (called ocean acidification): Time series of atmospheric CO_{2} at Mauna Loa (in parts per million volume, ppmv; red), surface ocean pCO_{2} (μatm; green) and surface ocean pH (blue) at Ocean Station ALOHA in the subtropical North Pacific Ocean.

One of the most important effects of climate change on oceans is an increase in ocean temperatures. More frequent marine heatwaves are linked to this. The rising temperature contributes to a rise in sea levels due to the expansion of water as it warms and the melting of ice sheets on land. Other effects on oceans include sea ice decline, reduced pH values and oxygen levels, as well as increased ocean stratification. All this can lead to changes in ocean currents, for example, a weakening of the Atlantic meridional overturning circulation (AMOC). The main cause of these changes is emissions of greenhouse gases from human activities, mainly burning of fossil fuels and deforestation. Carbon dioxide and methane are examples of greenhouse gases. The additional greenhouse effect leads to ocean warming because the ocean takes up most of the additional heat in the climate system. The ocean also absorbs some of the extra carbon dioxide that is in the atmosphere. This causes the pH value of the seawater to drop. Scientists estimate that the ocean absorbs about 25% of all human-caused CO_{2} emissions.

The various layers of the oceans have different temperatures. For example, the water is colder towards the bottom of the ocean. This temperature stratification will increase as the ocean surface warms due to rising air temperatures. Connected to this is a decline in mixing of the ocean layers, so that warm water stabilises near the surface. A reduction of cold, deep water circulation follows. The reduced vertical mixing makes it harder for the ocean to absorb heat. So a larger share of future warming goes into the atmosphere and land. One result is an increase in the amount of energy available for tropical cyclones and other storms. Another result is a decrease in nutrients for fish in the upper ocean layers. These changes also reduce the ocean's capacity to store carbon. At the same time, contrasts in salinity are increasing. Salty areas are becoming saltier and fresher areas less salty.

Warmer water cannot contain the same amount of oxygen as cold water. As a result, oxygen from the oceans moves to the atmosphere. Increased thermal stratification may reduce the supply of oxygen from surface waters to deeper waters. This lowers the water's oxygen content even more. The ocean has already lost oxygen throughout its water column. Oxygen minimum zones are increasing in size worldwide.

=== Sea level rise ===
The global average sea level has risen about 250 millimetres (9.8 in) since 1880, increasing the elevation on top of which other types of flooding (high-tide flooding and storm surge) occur.

Long-term sea level rise occurs in addition to intermittent tidal flooding. NOAA predicts different levels of sea level rise for coastlines within a single country.

The sea level has generally been rising since the end of the Last Glacial Maximum, which was around 20,000 years ago. Between 1901 and 2018, the global average sea level rose by 15–25 cm (6–10 in), with an increase of 2.3 mm (0.091 in) per year since the 1970s. This was faster than the sea level had ever risen over at least the past 3,000 years. The rate accelerated to 4.62 mm (0.182 in)/yr for the decade 2013–2022. Climate change due to human activities is the main cause of this persistent acceleration. Between 1993 and 2018, melting ice sheets and glaciers accounted for 44% of sea level rise, with another 42% resulting from thermal expansion of water.

Sea level rise lags behind changes in the Earth's temperature by decades, and sea level rise will therefore continue to accelerate between now and 2050 in response to warming that has already happened. What happens after that depends on future human greenhouse gas emissions. According to modelling in the early 2020s, if there are very deep cuts in emissions, sea level rise would slow down between 2050 and 2100. In that scenario, it would rise by between 30 cm (1 ft) and 1.0 m (3 1/3 ft) between the early 2020s and 2100, or by approximately 60 cm (2 ft) to 130 cm (4 1/2 ft) from the 19th century to 2100. With high emissions it would instead accelerate further, and could rise by 50 cm (1.6 ft) or even by 1.9 m (6.2 ft) by 2100. In the long run, sea level rise would amount to 2–3 m (7–10 ft) over the next 2000 years if warming stays to its current 1.5 °C (2.7 °F) over the pre-industrial past. It would be 19–22 metres (62–72 ft) if warming peaks at 5 °C (9.0 °F). The expected increase in flood hazard potential is often exceedingly large even for modest sea-level rise scenarios, ranging from 10 to 1000 for rises of 0.5 m or less.

== Ice and snow ==
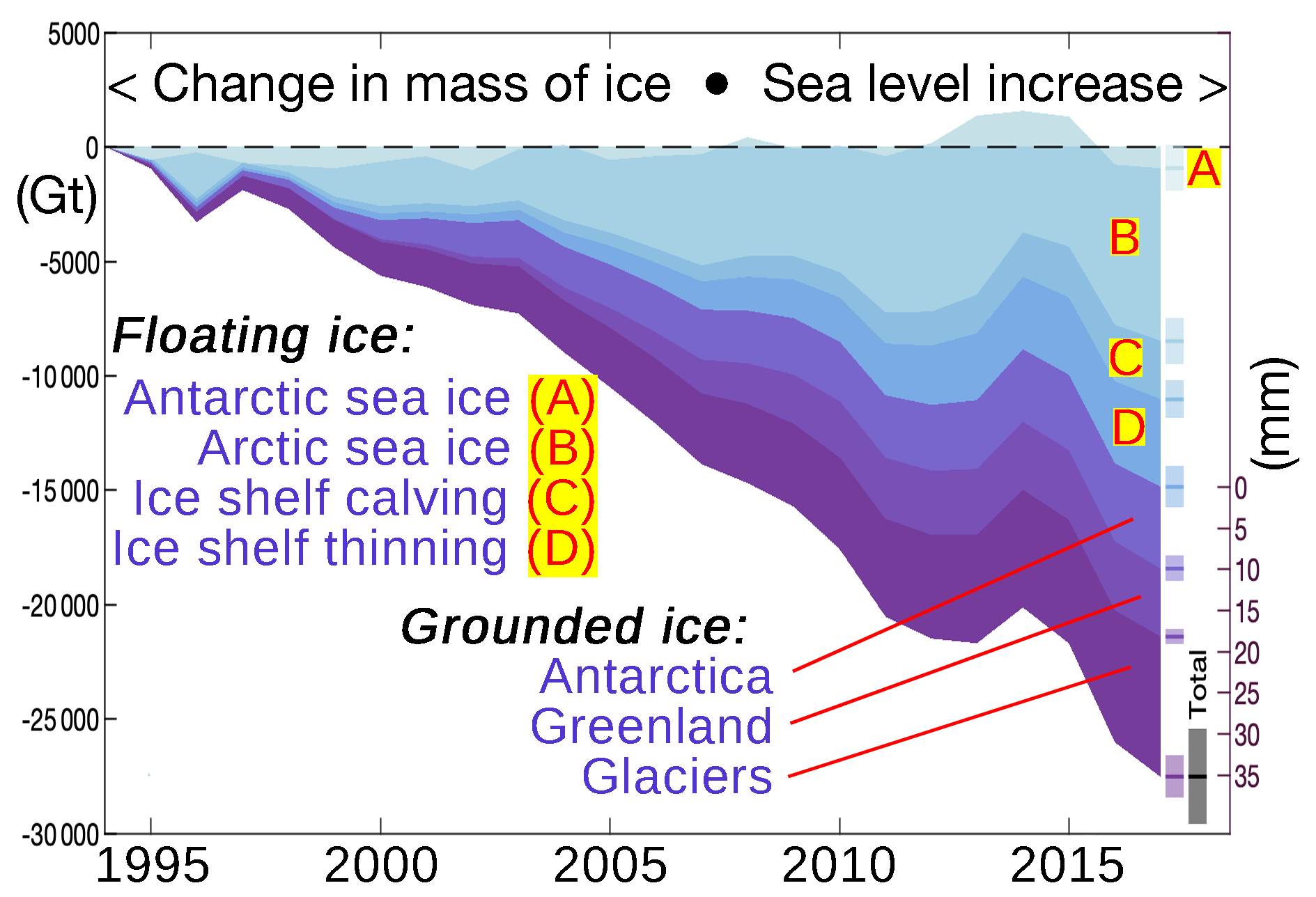
Earth lost 28 trillion tonnes of ice between 1994 and 2017, with melting grounded ice (ice sheets and glaciers) raising the global sea level by 34.6 ±3.1 mm. The rate of ice loss has risen by 57% since the 1990s−from 0.8 to 1.2 trillion tonnes per year.

Melting of glacial mass is approximately linearly related to temperature rise.

The cryosphere, the area of the Earth covered by snow or ice, is extremely sensitive to changes in global climate. There has been an extensive loss of snow on land since 1981. Some of the largest declines have been observed in the spring. During the 21st century, snow cover is projected to continue its retreat in almost all regions.

=== Glaciers decline ===
Since the beginning of the twentieth century, there has been a widespread retreat of glaciers. Those glaciers that are not associated with the polar ice sheets lost around 8% of their mass between 1971 and 2019. In the Andes in South America and in the Himalayas in Asia, the retreat of glaciers could impact water supply. The melting of those glaciers could also cause landslides or glacial lake outburst floods.

=== Ice sheets decline ===
The melting of the Greenland and West Antarctic ice sheets will continue to contribute to sea level rise over long time-scales. The Greenland ice sheet loss is mainly driven by melt from the top. Antarctic ice loss is driven by warm ocean water melting the outlet glaciers.

Future melt of the West Antarctic ice sheet is potentially abrupt under a high emission scenario, as a consequence of a partial collapse. Part of the ice sheet is grounded on bedrock below sea level. This makes it possibly vulnerable to the self-enhancing process of marine ice sheet instability. Marine ice cliff instability could also contribute to a partial collapse. But there is limited evidence for its importance. A partial collapse of the ice sheet would lead to rapid sea level rise and a local decrease in ocean salinity. It would be irreversible for decades and possibly even millennia. The complete loss of the West Antarctic ice sheet would cause over 5 metres (16 ft) of sea level rise.

In contrast to the West Antarctic ice sheet, melt of the Greenland ice sheet is projected to take place more gradually over millennia. Sustained warming between 1 °C (1.8 °F) (low confidence) and 4 °C (7.2 °F) (medium confidence) would lead to a complete loss of the ice sheet. This would contribute 7 m (23 ft) to sea levels globally. The ice loss could become irreversible due to a further self-enhancing feedback. This is called the elevation-surface mass balance feedback. When ice melts on top of the ice sheet, the elevation drops. Air temperature is higher at lower altitudes, so this promotes further melting.

=== Sea ice decline ===
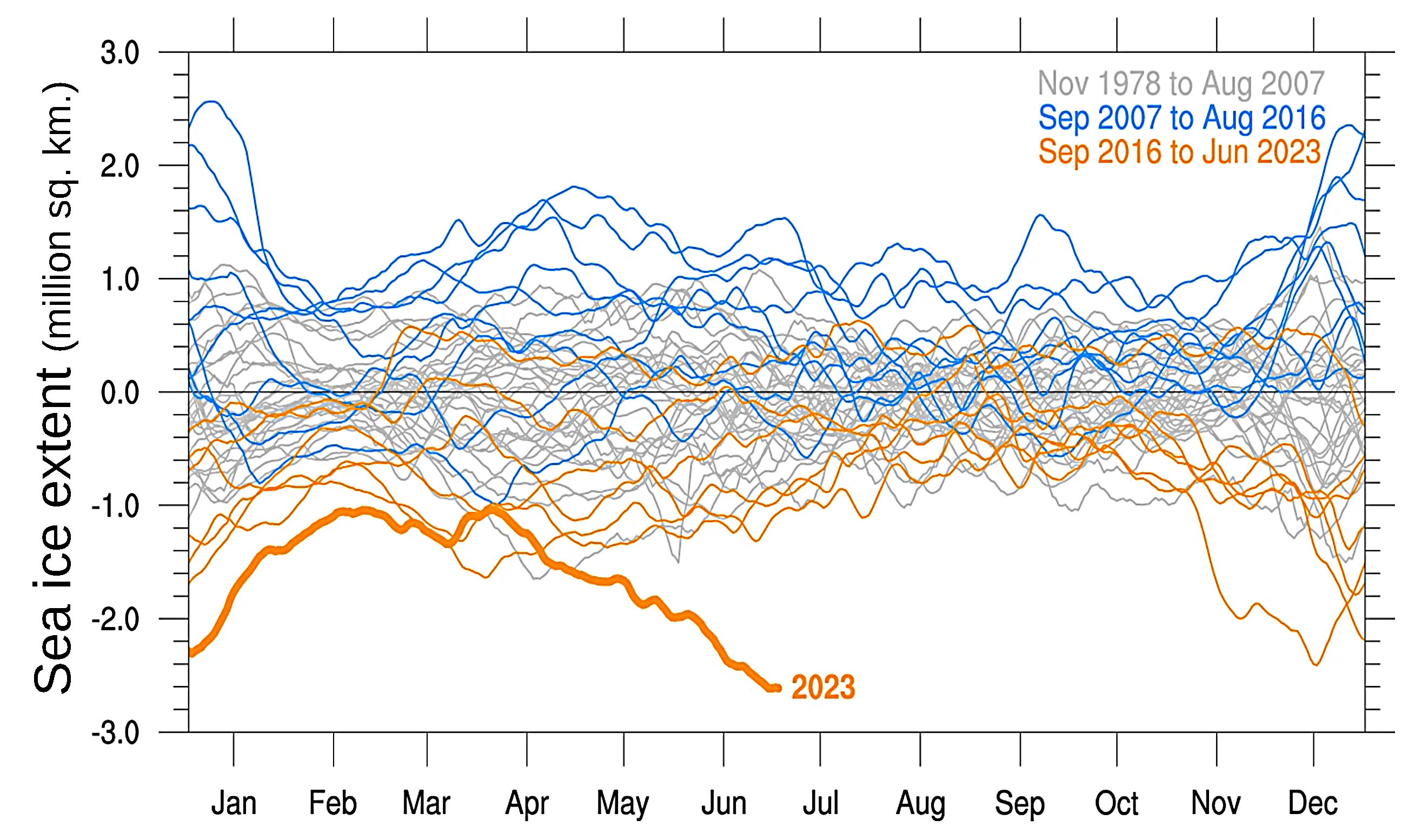
Reporting the reduction in Antarctic sea ice extent in mid 2023, researchers concluded that a "regime shift" may be taking place "in which previously important relationships no longer dominate sea ice variability".

Sea ice reflects 50% to 70% of the incoming solar radiation back into space. Only 6% of incoming solar energy is reflected by the ocean. As the climate warms, the area covered by snow or sea ice decreases. After sea ice melts, more energy is absorbed by the ocean, so it warms up. This ice-albedo feedback is a self-reinforcing feedback of climate change. Large-scale measurements of sea ice have only been possible since satellites came into use.

Sea ice in the Arctic has declined in recent decades in area and volume due to climate change. It has been melting more in summer than it refreezes in winter. The decline of sea ice in the Arctic has been accelerating during the early twenty-first century. It has a rate of decline of 4.7% per decade. It has declined over 50% since the first satellite records. Ice-free summers are expected to be rare at 1.5 °C (2.7 °F) degrees of warming. They are set to occur at least once every decade with a warming level of 2 °C (3.6 °F). The Arctic will likely become ice-free at the end of some summers before 2050.

Sea ice extent in Antarctica varies a lot year by year. This makes it difficult to determine a trend, and record highs and record lows have been observed between 2013 and 2023. The general trend since 1979, the start of the satellite measurements, has been roughly flat. Between 2015 and 2023, there has been a decline in sea ice, but due to the high variability, this does not correspond to a significant trend.

=== Permafrost thawing ===
Globally, permafrost warmed by about 0.3 °C between 2007 and 2016. The extent of permafrost has been falling for decades. More decline is expected in the future. Permafrost thaw makes the ground weaker and unstable. The thaw can seriously damage human infrastructure in permafrost areas such as railways, settlements and pipelines. Thawing soil can also release methane and CO_{2} from decomposing microbes. This can generate a strong feedback loop to global warming. Some scientists believe that carbon storage in permafrost globally is approximately 1600 gigatons. This is twice the atmospheric pool.

== Wildlife and nature ==
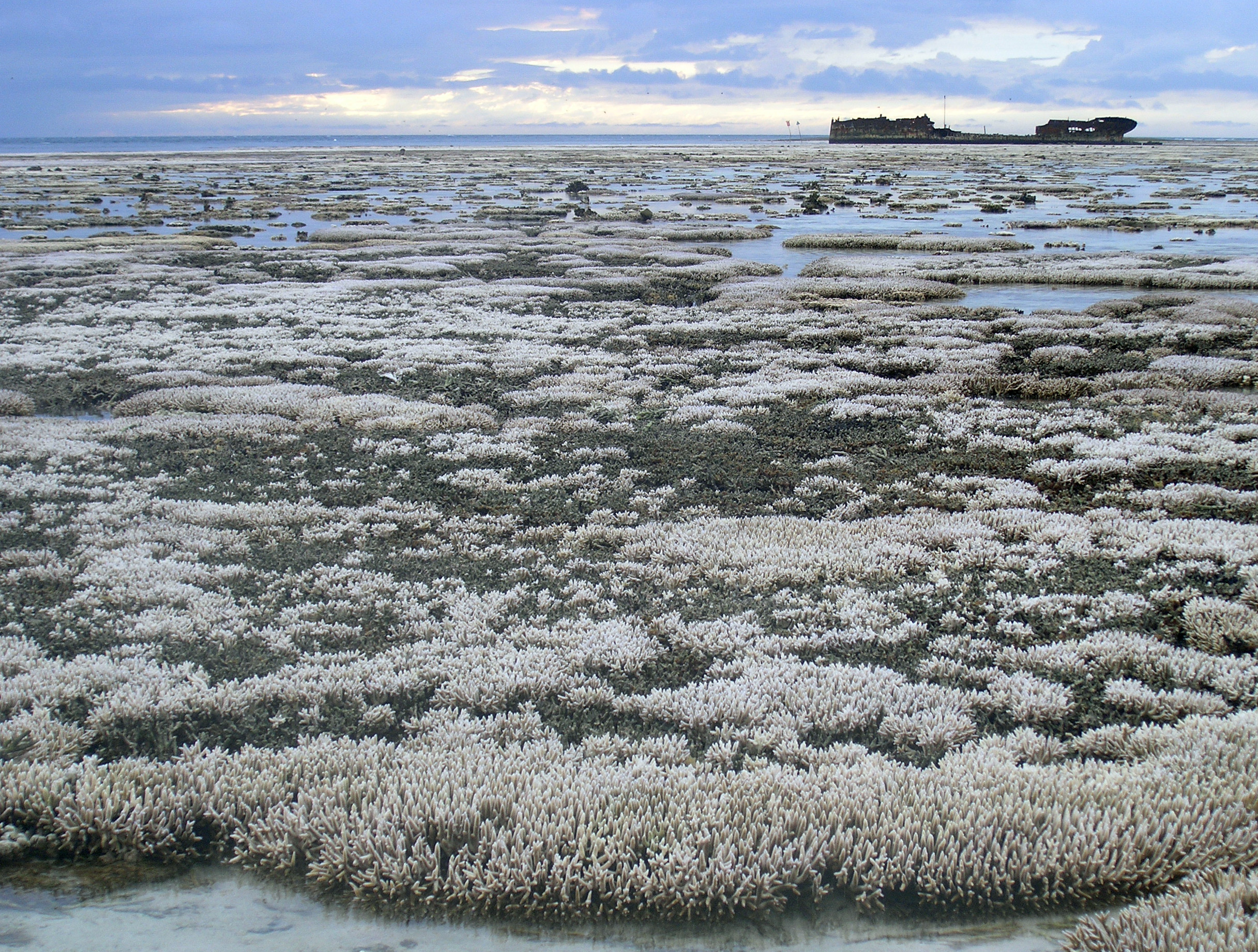
Part of the Great Barrier Reef in Australia in 2016 after a coral bleaching event (partly caused by rising ocean temperatures and marine heatwaves).

Recent warming has had a big effect on natural biological systems. Species worldwide are moving poleward to colder areas. On land, species may move to higher elevations. Marine species find colder water at greater depths. Climate change had the third biggest impact on nature out of various factors in the five decades up to 2020. Only change in land use and sea use and direct exploitation of organisms had a bigger impact.

The impacts of climate change on nature are likely to become bigger in the next few decades. The stresses caused by climate change, combine with other stresses on ecological systems such as land conversion, land degradation, harvesting, and pollution. They threaten substantial damage to unique ecosystems. They can even result in their complete loss and the extinction of species. This can disrupt key interactions between species within ecosystems. This is because species from one location do not leave the warming habitat at the same rate. The result is rapid changes in the way the ecosystem functions. Impacts include changes in regional rainfall patterns, earlier leafing of trees and plants over many regions, movements of species to higher latitudes and altitudes, changes in bird migrations, and shifting of the oceans' plankton and fish from cold- to warm-adapted communities.

These changes of land and ocean ecosystems have direct effects on human well-being. For instance, ocean ecosystems help with coastal protection and provide food. Freshwater and land ecosystems can provide water for human consumption. Furthermore, these ecosystems can store carbon. This helps to stabilize the climate system.

=== Ecosystems on land ===
Climate change is a major driver of biodiversity loss in different land types. These include cool conifer forests, savannas, mediterranean-climate systems, tropical forests, and the Arctic tundra. In other ecosystems, land-use change may be a stronger driver of biodiversity loss, at least in the near term. Beyond 2050, climate change may be the major cause of biodiversity loss globally. Climate change interacts with other pressures. These include habitat modification, pollution and invasive species. Through this interaction, climate change increases the risk of extinction for many terrestrial and freshwater species. At 1.2 °C (2.2 °F) of warming (around 2023) some ecosystems are threatened by mass die-offs of trees and from heatwaves. At 2 °C (3.6 °F) of warming, around 10% of species on land would become critically endangered. This differs by group. For instance insects and salamanders are more vulnerable.

The rate of global tree cover loss has approximately doubled since 2001, to an annual loss approaching an area the size of Italy.

Rainfall on the Amazon rainforest is recycled when it evaporates back into the atmosphere instead of running off away from the rainforest. This water is essential for sustaining the rainforest. Due to deforestation the rainforest is losing this ability. This effect is even worse because climate change brings more frequent droughts to the area. The higher frequency of droughts in the first two decades of the 21st century and other data signal that a tipping point from rainforest to savanna might be close. A 2019 study concluded that this ecosystem could begin a 50-year-long collapse to a savanna around 2021. After that it would become increasingly and disproportionally more difficult to prevent or reverse this shift.

=== Marine ecosystems ===
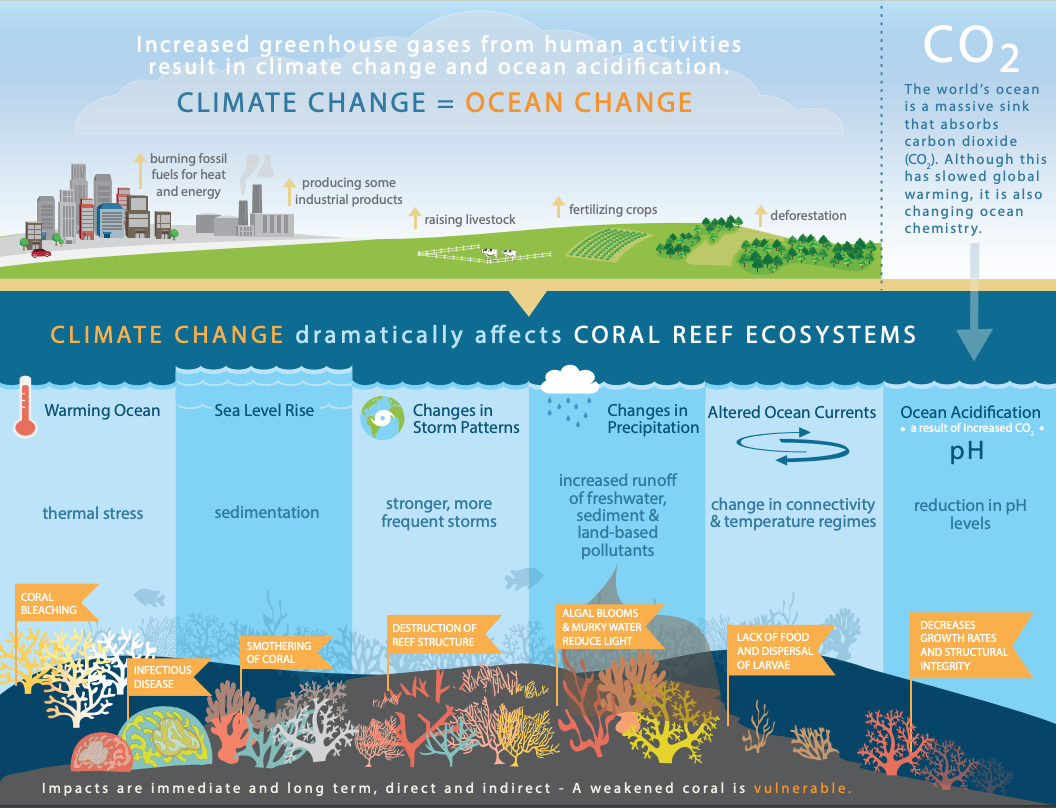
Climate change will affect coral reef ecosystems, through sea level rise, changes to the frequency and intensity of tropical storms, and altered ocean circulation patterns. When combined, all of these impacts dramatically alter ecosystem function, as well as the goods and services coral reef ecosystems provide.

Marine heatwaves are happening more often. They have widespread impacts on life in the oceans. These include mass dying events and coral bleaching. Harmful algae blooms have increased. This is in response to warming waters, loss of oxygen and eutrophication. Melting sea ice destroys habitat, including for algae that grows on its underside.

Ocean acidification can harm marine organisms in various ways. Shell-forming organisms like oysters are particularly vulnerable. Some phytoplankton and seagrass species may benefit. However, some of these are toxic to fish phytoplankton species. Their spread poses risks to fisheries and aquaculture. Fighting pollution can reduce the impact of acidification.

Warm-water coral reefs are very sensitive to global warming and ocean acidification. Coral reefs provide a habitat for thousands of species. They provide ecosystem services such as coastal protection and food. But 70–90% of today's warm-water coral reefs will disappear even if warming is kept to 1.5 °C (2.7 °F). Coral reefs are framework organisms. They build physical structures that form habitats for other sea creatures. Other framework organisms are also at risk from climate change. Mangroves and seagrass are considered to be at moderate risk from lower levels of global warming.

== Tipping points and irreversible impacts ==
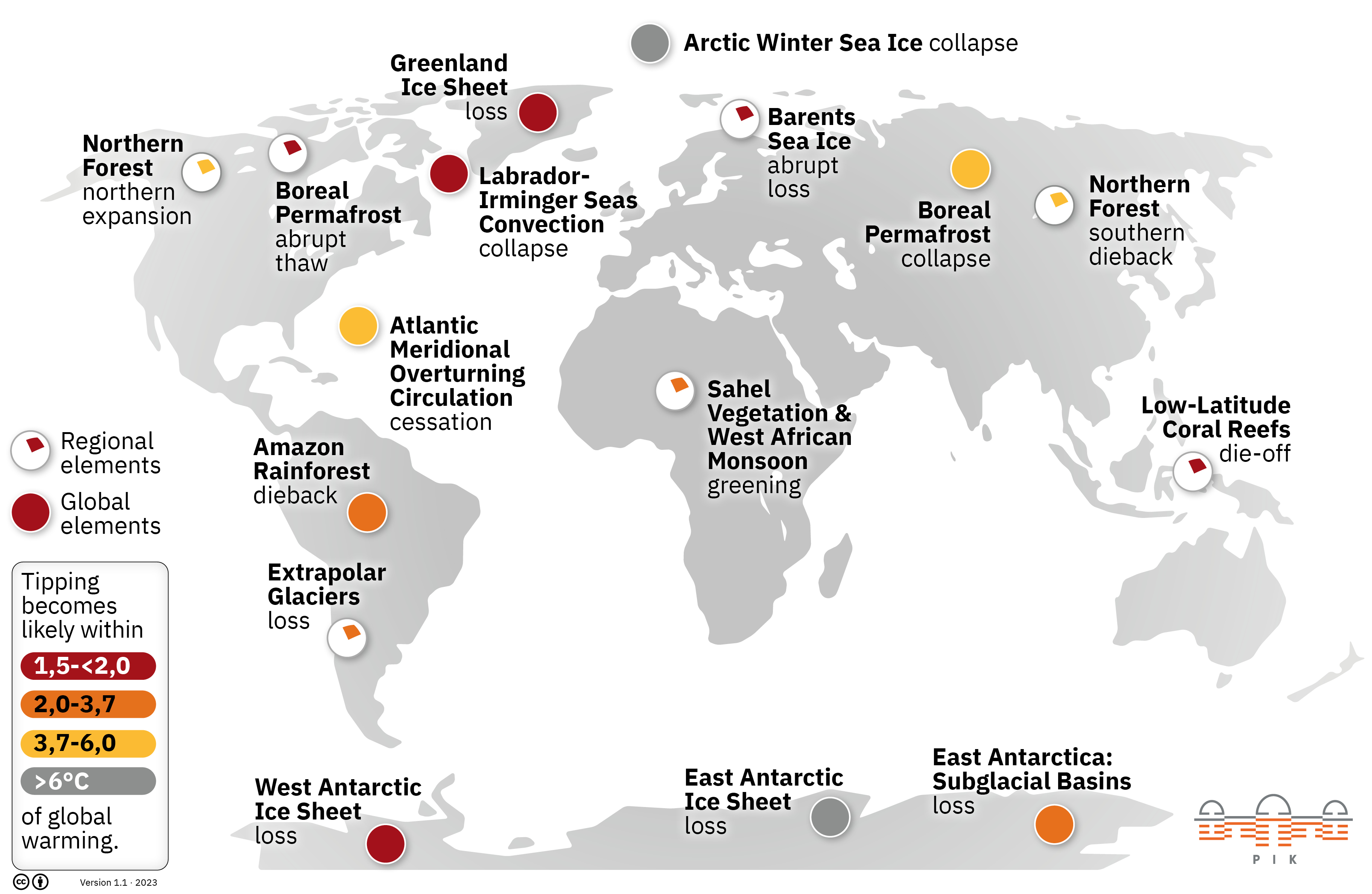
There are a number of places around the globe which can pass a tipping point around a certain level of warming, and eventually transition to a different state.

The climate system exhibits "threshold behavior" or tipping points when parts of the natural environment enter into a new state. Examples are the runaway loss of ice sheets or the dieback of forests. Tipping behavior is found in all parts of the climate system. These include ecosystems, ice sheets, and the circulation of the ocean and atmosphere. Tipping points are studied using data from Earth's distant past and by physical modeling. There is already moderate risk of global tipping points at 1 °C (1.8 °F) above pre-industrial temperatures. That becomes a high risk at 2.5 °C (4.5 °F). It is possible that some tipping points are close or have already been crossed. Examples are the West Antarctic and Greenland ice sheets, the Amazon rainforest, and warm-water coral reefs.

Tipping points are perhaps the most dangerous aspect of future climate change, potentially leading to irreversible impacts on society. A collapse of the Atlantic meridional overturning circulation would likely halve rainfall in India and lead to severe drops in temperature in Northern Europe. Many tipping points are interlinked such that triggering one may lead to a cascade of effects. This remains a possibility even well below 2 °C (3.6 °F) of warming. A 2018 study states that 45% of environmental problems, including those caused by climate change, are interconnected. This increases the risk of a domino effect.

Further impacts may be irreversible, at least over the timescale of many human generations. This includes warming of the deep ocean and acidification. These are set to continue even when global temperatures stop rising. In biological systems, the extinction of species would be an irreversible impact. In social systems, unique cultures may be lost. Climate change could make it more likely that endangered languages disappear.

== Health, food security and water security ==
Humans have a climate niche. This is a certain range of temperatures in which they flourish. Outside that niche, conditions are less favourable. This leads to negative effects on health, food security and more. This niche is a mean annual temperature below 29 °C. As of May 2023, 60 million people lived outside this niche. With every additional 0.1 degree of warming, 140 million people will be pushed out of it.

=== Health ===
Climate change affects human health in many ways, including an increase in heat-related illnesses and deaths, worsened air quality, the spread of infectious diseases, and health risks associated with extreme weather such as floods and storms. Rising global temperatures and changes in weather patterns are increasing the severity of heat waves and extreme weather events. These events in turn have direct and indirect impacts on human health. For example, when people are exposed to higher temperatures for longer time periods they might experience heat illness and heat-related death.

In addition to direct impacts, climate change and extreme weather events cause changes in biomes. Certain diseases that are carried and spread by living hosts such as mosquitoes and ticks (known as vectors) may become more common in some regions. Affected diseases include dengue fever and malaria. Contracting waterborne diseases such as diarrhoeal disease will also be more likely.

Changes in climate can cause decreasing yields for some crops and regions, resulting in higher food prices, less available food, and under nutrition. Climate change can also reduce access to clean and safe water supply. Extreme weather and its health impact can also threaten the livelihoods and economic stability of people. These factors together can lead to increasing poverty, human migration, violent conflict, and mental health issues.

==== Mental health ====
The psychological impacts of climate change concerns effects that climate change can have on individuals' mental and emotional well-being. They may also relate to more generalized effects on groups and their behaviors, such as the urge to migrate from affected areas of the globe to areas perceived as less affected. These impacts can manifest in various ways and affect people of all ages and backgrounds.

The effects of climate change on mental health and wellbeing are being documented as the consequences of climate change become more tangible and impactful. This is especially the case for vulnerable populations and those with pre-existing serious mental illness. There are three broad pathways by which these effects can take place: directly, indirectly or via awareness. The direct pathway includes stress-related conditions caused by exposure to extreme weather events. These include post-traumatic stress disorder (PTSD). Scientific studies have linked mental health to several climate-related exposures. These include heat, humidity, rainfall, drought, wildfires and floods. The bushfires in Australia had a direct effect on its citizens' mental health with a PTSD rate of 3.6% in comparison to its previous 2.4%. The indirect pathway can be disruption to economic and social activities. An example is when an area of farmland is less able to produce food. The third pathway can be of mere awareness of the climate change threat, even by individuals who are not otherwise affected by it. This especially manifests in the form of anxiety over the quality of life for future generations.

=== Food security ===
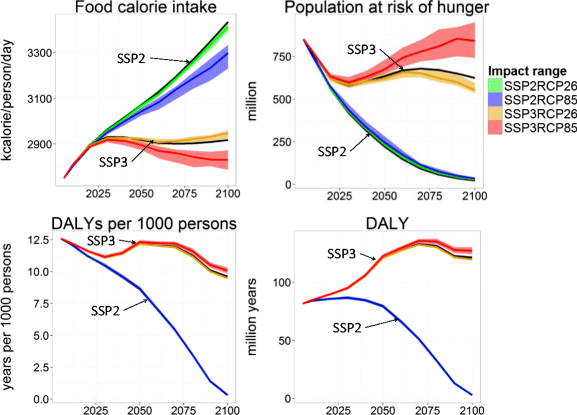
Projected changes in average food availability (represented as calorie consumption per capita), population at risk of hunger and disability-adjusted life years under two Shared Socioeconomic Pathways: the baseline, SSP2, and SSP3, scenario of high global rivalry and conflict. The red and the orange lines show projections for SSP3 assuming high and low intensity of future emissions and the associated climate change.

Climate change will affect agriculture and food production around the world. The reasons include the effects of elevated CO_{2} in the atmosphere. Higher temperatures and altered precipitation and transpiration regimes are also factors. Increased frequency of extreme events and modified weed, pest, and pathogen pressure are other factors. Droughts result in crop failures and the loss of pasture for livestock. Loss and poor growth of livestock cause milk yield and meat production to decrease. The rate of soil erosion is 10–20 times higher than the rate of soil accumulation in agricultural areas that use no-till farming. In areas with tilling it is 100 times higher. Climate change worsens this type of land degradation and desertification.

Climate change is exerting additional stress on land and water resources, exacerbating existing risks to livelihoods, biodiversity and agrifood systems. This trend is predicted to continue due to the increased demand for food and other products, land degradation, climate change and biodiversity loss. With consequences for all components of agrifood systems, including land, soil and water resources, the impacts of climate change are increasingly evident in the form of rising temperatures, changing precipitation patterns, and mounting incidence of extreme events such as droughts and floods. The growing frequency and intensity of disasters caused by extreme weather events are taking an unparalleled toll on food production, with annual losses in 2025 estimated at US$123 billion, equivalent to 5% of global agricultural gross domestic product.

Climate change is projected to negatively affect all four pillars of food security. It will affect how much food is available. It will also affect how easy food is to access through prices, food quality, and how stable the food system is. Climate change is already affecting the productivity of wheat and other staples.

In many areas, fishery catches are already decreasing because of global warming and changes in biochemical cycles. In combination with overfishing, warming waters decrease the amount of fish in the ocean. Per degree of warming, ocean biomass is expected to decrease by about 5%. Tropical and subtropical oceans are most affected, while there may be more fish in polar waters.

=== Water security ===
Water resources can be affected by climate change in various ways. The total amount of freshwater available can change, for instance due to dry spells or droughts. Heavy rainfall and flooding can have an impact on water quality. They can transport pollutants into water bodies through increased surface runoff. In coastal regions, more salt may find its way into water resources due to higher sea levels and more intense storms. Higher temperatures also directly degrade water quality. This is because warm water contains less oxygen. Changes in the water cycle threaten existing and future water infrastructure. It will be harder to plan investments for water infrastructure. This is because there are significant uncertainties about future variability of the water cycle.

Between 1.5 and 2.5 billion people live in areas with regular water security issues. If global warming reaches 4 °C (7.2 °F), water insecurity would affect about twice as many people. Water resources are likely to decrease in most dry subtropical regions and mid-latitudes. But they will increase in high latitudes. However, variable streamflow means even regions with increased water resources can experience additional short-term shortages. In the arid regions of India, China, the US and Africa dry spells and drought are already affecting water availability.

== Human settlements ==
Climate change is particularly likely to affect the Arctic, Africa, small islands, Asian megadeltas and the Middle East regions. Low-latitude, less-developed regions are most at risk of experiencing negative climate change impacts. The ten countries of the Association of Southeast Asian Nations (ASEAN) are among the most vulnerable in the world to the negative effects of climate change. ASEAN's climate mitigation efforts are not in proportion to the climate change threats the region faces.

=== Impacts from heat ===
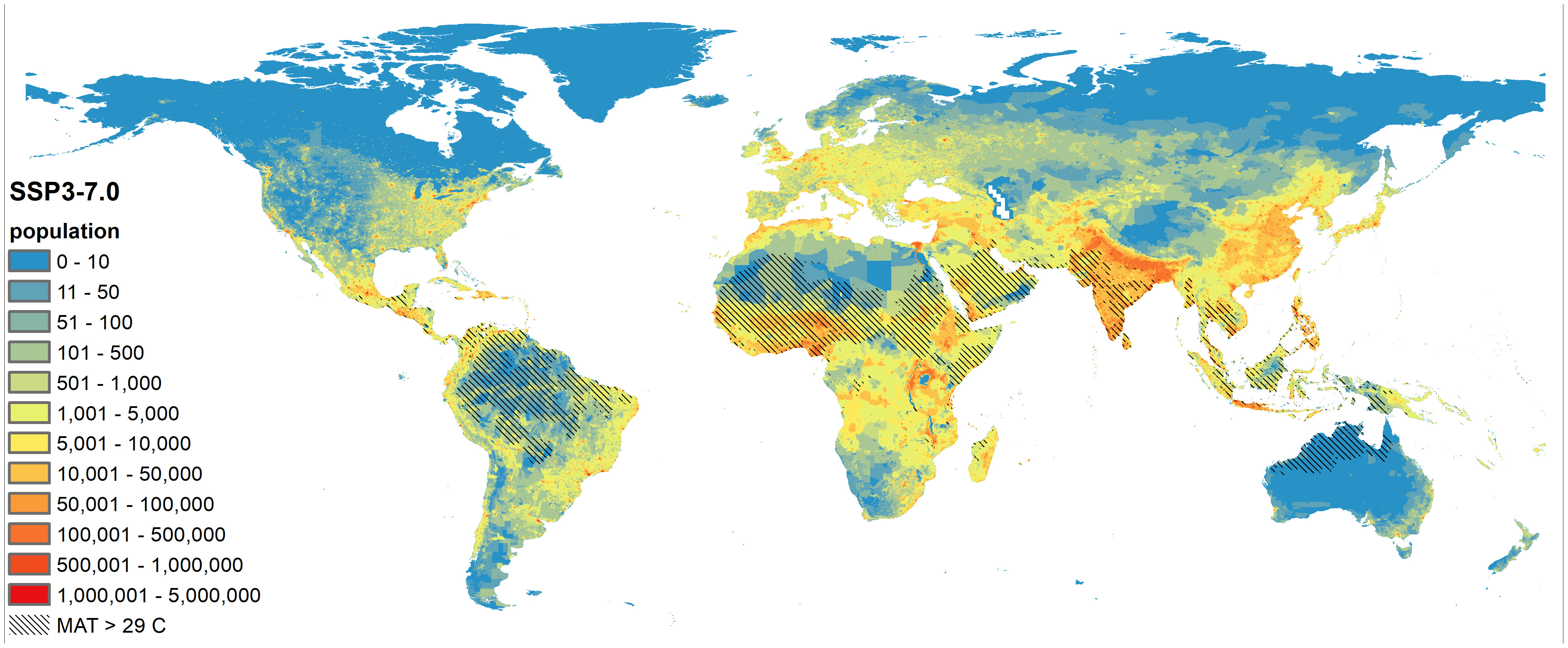
Overlap between future population distribution and extreme heat in a high emission scenario

Regions inhabited by a third of the human population could become as hot as the hottest parts of the Sahara within 50 years. This would happen if greenhouse gas emissions continue to grow rapidly without a change in patterns of population growth and without migration. The projected average temperature of above 29 °C (84 °F) for these regions would be outside the "human temperature niche". This is a range for climate that is biologically suitable for humans. It is based on historical data of mean annual temperatures. The most affected regions have little adaptive capacity.

Increased extreme heat exposure from climate change and the urban heat island effect threatens urban settlements. This is made worse by the loss of shade from urban trees that cannot withstand the heat stress.

In 2019, the Crowther Lab from ETH Zurich paired the climatic conditions of 520 major cities worldwide with the predicted climatic conditions of cities in 2050. It found that 22% of the major cities would have climatic conditions that do not exist in any city today. For instance, 2050 London would have a climate similar to 2019 Melbourne in Australia. Athens and Madrid would be like Fez in Morocco. Nairobi in Kenya would be like Maputo in Mozambique. The Indian city Pune would be like Bamako in Mali and Bamako would be like Niamey in Niger. Brasilia would be like Goiania, both in Brazil.

=== Low-lying coastal regions ===
Low-lying cities and other settlements near the sea face multiple simultaneous risks from climate change. They face flooding risks from sea level rise. In addition they may face impacts from more severe storms, ocean acidification, and salt intrusion into the groundwater. Changes like continued development in exposed areas increase the risks that these regions face.

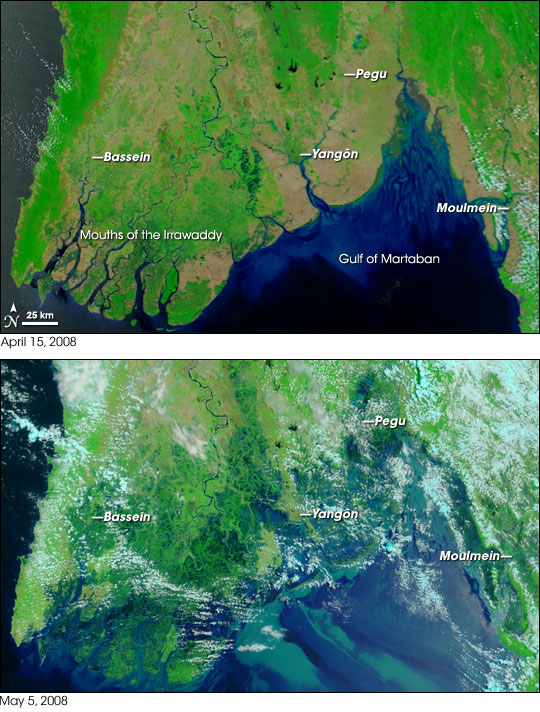
Floodplains and low-lying coastal areas will flood more frequently due to climate change, like this area of Myanmar which was submerged by Cyclone Nargis.

Population density on the coasts is high. Estimates of the number of people at risk of coastal flooding from climate-driven sea level rise vary. Estimates range from 190 million to 300 million. It could even be 640 million in a worst-case scenario related to the instability of the Antarctic ice sheet. People are most affected in the densely populated low-lying megadeltas of Asia and Africa.

Small island developing states are especially vulnerable. They are likely to experience more intense storm surges, salt water intrusion and coastal destruction. Low-lying small islands in the Pacific, Indian, and Caribbean regions even risk permanent inundation. This would displace their population. On the islands of Fiji, Tonga and western Samoa, migrants from outer islands inhabit low and unsafe areas along the coasts. The entire populations of small atoll nations such as Kiribati, Maldives, the Marshall Islands, and Tuvalu are at risk of being displaced. This could raise issues of statelessness. Several factors increase their vulnerability. These are small size, isolation from other land, low financial resources, and lack of protective infrastructure.

== Impacts on societies ==
Estimates of damage to GDP vary widely, and even this approach to predicting damage does not consider impacts of climate tipping points, climate-driven extreme events, human health impacts, resource or migration-driven conflict, geopolitical tension, nature-driven risks, or sea level rise.

Climate change has many impacts on society. It affects health, the availability of drinking water and food, inequality and economic growth. The effects of climate change are often interlinked. They can exacerbate each other as well as existing vulnerabilities. Some areas may become too hot for humans to live in. Climate-related changes or disasters may lead people in some areas to move to other parts of the country or to other countries.

Some scientists describe the effects of climate change, with continuing increases in greenhouse gas emissions, as a "climate emergency" or "climate crisis". Some researchers and activists describe them as an existential threat to civilization. Some define these threats under climate security. The consequences of climate change, and the failure to address it, can distract people from tackling its root causes. This leads to what some researchers have termed a "climate doom loop".

=== Displacement and migration ===
Displacement is when people move within a country. Migration is when they move to another country. Some people use the terms interchangeably. Climate change affects displacement in several ways. More frequent and severe weather-related disasters may increase involuntary displacement. These destroy homes and habitats. Climate impacts such as desertification and rising sea levels gradually erode livelihoods. They force communities to abandon traditional homelands. Other forms of migration are adaptive and voluntary. They are based on individual or household decisions. On the other hand, some households may fall into poverty or get poorer due to climate change. This limits their ability to move to less affected areas.

Migration due to climate and weather is usually within countries. But it is long-distance. Slow-onset disasters such as droughts and heat are more likely to cause long-term migration than weather disasters like floods. Migration due to desertification and reduced soil fertility is typically from rural areas in developing countries to towns and cities.

According to the Internal Displacement Monitoring Centre, extreme weather events displaced approximately 30 million people in 2020. Violence and wars displaced approximately 10 million in the same year. There may have been a contribution of climate change to these conflicts. In 2018, the World Bank estimated that climate change will cause internal migration of between 31 and 143 million people by 2050. This would be as they escape crop failures, water scarcity, and sea level rise. The study covered only Sub-Saharan Africa, South Asia, and Latin America.

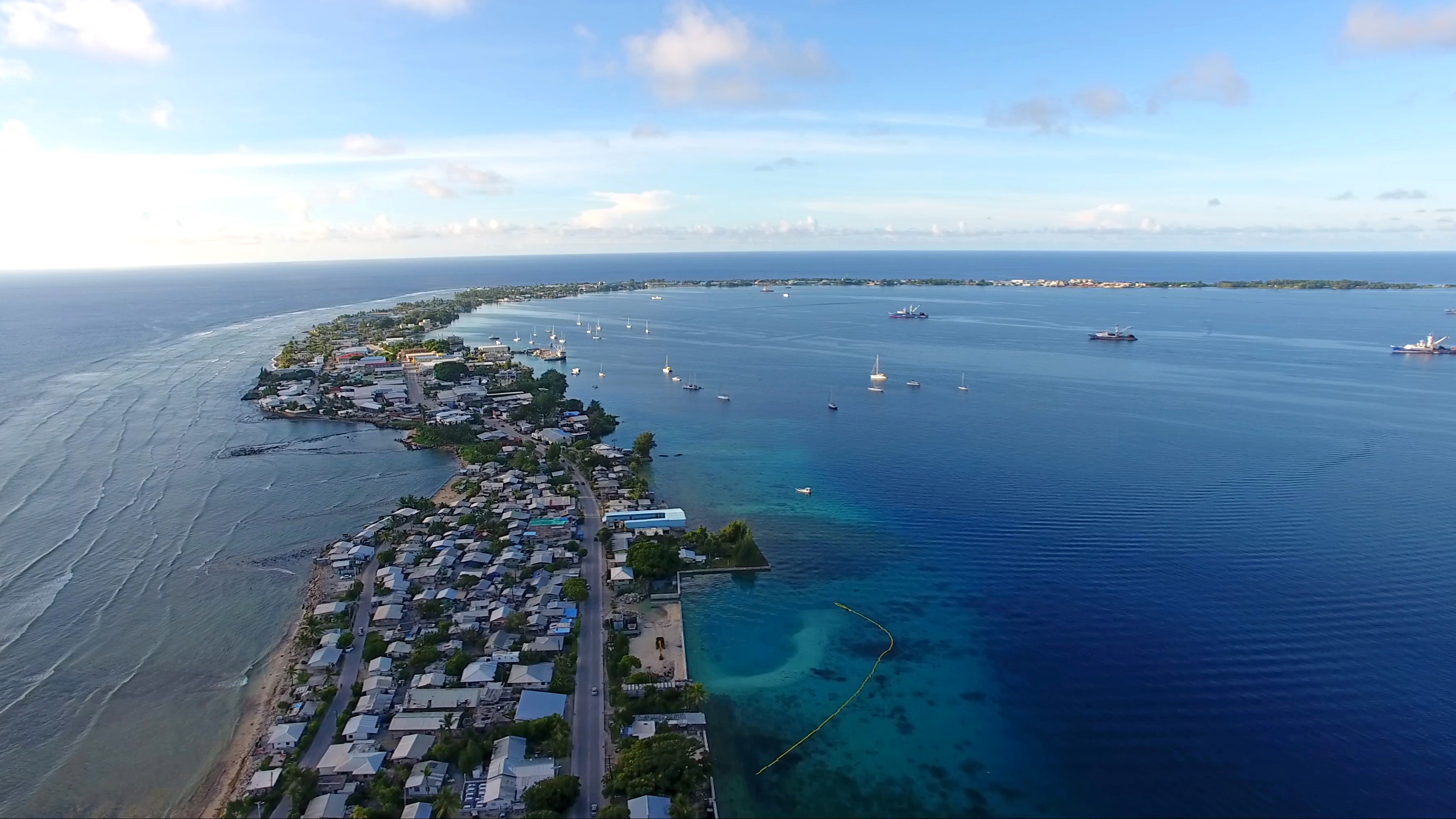
Sea level rise at the Marshall Islands, reaching the edge of a village (from the documentary One Word)

=== Conflict ===
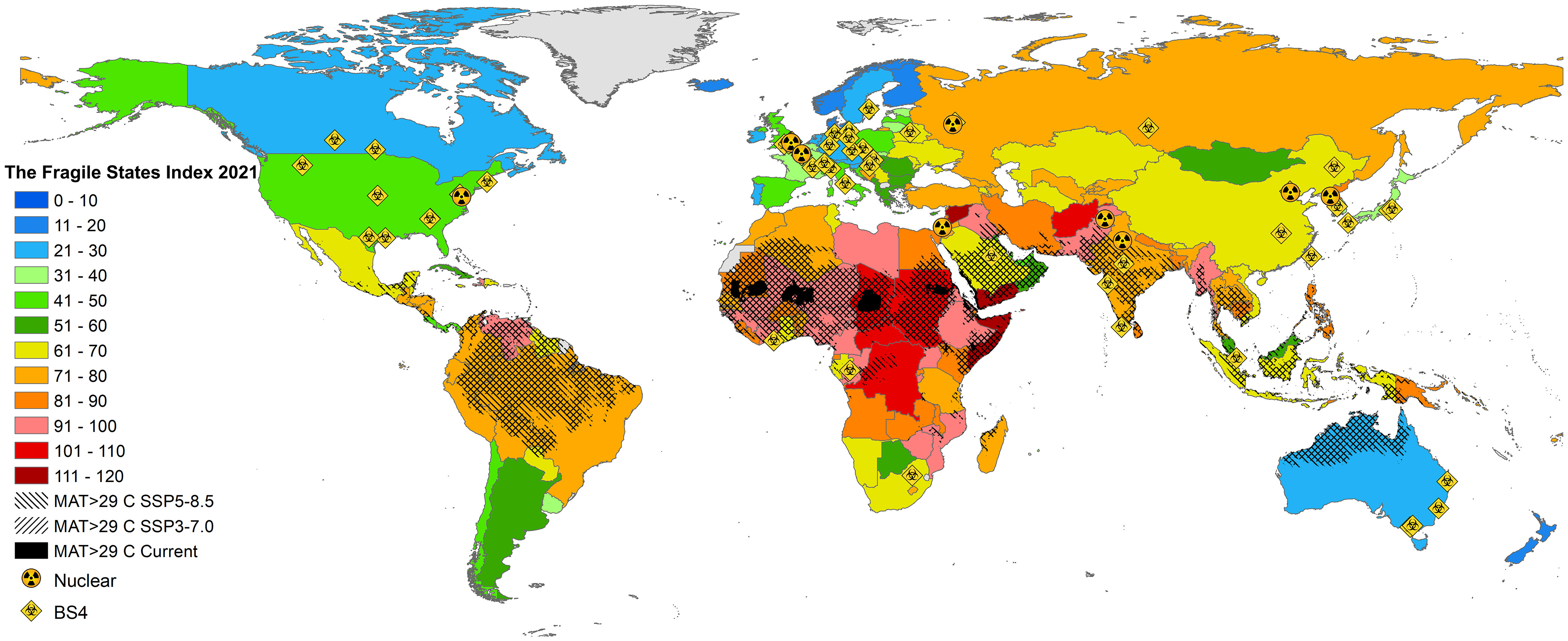
Overlap between state fragility, extreme heat, and nuclear and biological catastrophic hazards

Climate change is unlikely to cause international wars in the foreseeable future. However, climate change can increase the risk for intrastate conflicts, such as civil wars, communal violence, or protests. The IPCC Sixth Assessment Report concludes: "Climate hazards have affected armed conflict within countries (medium confidence), but the influence of climate is small compared to socio-economic, political, and cultural factors (high confidence)."

Climate change can increase conflict risks by causing tensions about scarce resources like food, water and land, by weakening state institutions, by reducing the opportunity costs for impoverished individuals to join armed groups, and by causing tensions related to (climate-induced) migration. Efforts to mitigate or adapt to climate change can also cause conflicts, for instance due to higher food and energy prices or when people are forcibly re-located from vulnerable areas.

Research has shown that climate change is not the most important conflict driver, and that it can only affect conflict risks under certain circumstances. Relevant context factors include agricultural dependence, a history of political instability, poverty, and the political exclusion of ethnic groups. Climate change has thus been described as a "threat multiplier". Yet, an impact of climate change on specific conflicts like the Syrian civil war or the armed conflict in Darfur remains hard to prove. At the micro level, temperature volatility associated with climate change has likewise been found to act as a risk multiplier for short-term spikes in interpersonal violent crime.

=== Social impacts on vulnerable groups ===
Climate change does not affect people within communities in the same way. It can have a bigger impact on vulnerable groups such as women, the elderly, religious minorities and refugees than on others.

- People living with disability. Climate impacts on disabled people have been identified by activists and advocacy groups as well as through the UNHCR adopting a resolution on climate change and the rights of people with disabilities.
- People living in poverty: Climate change disproportionally affects poor people in low-income communities and developing countries around the world. Those in poverty have a higher chance of experiencing the ill-effects of climate change, due to their increased exposure and vulnerability. A 2020 World Bank paper estimated that between 32 million to 132 million additional people will be pushed into extreme poverty by 2030 due to climate change.
- Women: Climate change increases gender inequality. It reduces women's ability to be financially independent, and has an overall negative impact on the social and political rights of women. This is especially the case in economies that are heavily based on agriculture.
- Indigenous peoples: Indigenous communities tend to rely more on the environment for food and other necessities. This makes them more vulnerable to disturbances in ecosystems. Indigenous communities across the globe generally have bigger economic disadvantages than non-indigenous communities. This is due to the oppression they have experienced. These disadvantages include less access to education and jobs and higher rates of poverty. All this makes them more vulnerable to climate change.
- Children: The Lancet review on health and climate change lists children among the worst-affected by global warming. Children under 14 are 44 percent more likely to die from environmental factors.

In July 2026, an interim report on research done by Plan International and the University of Technology Sydney showed that the effects of climate change in Asia and the Pacific areas (specifically Bangladesh, Nepal, and Solomon Islands) were particularly pronounced on the lives of adolescent girls. The prevalence of child marriage increased in times of climate event stress, when families lost their livelihoods and thus income owing to flooding and other natural disasters. According to the International Rescue Committee, the rate of child marriages rose up to 39 per cent after such an event, as the family could not afford to keep a daughter at home and pay for her education.

=== Possibility of societal collapse ===
Climate change has long been described as a severe risk to humans. Climate change as an existential threat has emerged as a key theme in the climate movement. People from small island nations also use this theme. There has not been extensive research in this topic. Existential risks are threats that could cause the extinction of humanity or destroy the potential of intelligent life on Earth. Key risks of climate change do not fit that definition. However, some key climate risks do have an impact people's ability to survive. For instance, areas may become too hot to survive, or sea level rise may make it impossible to live at a specific location.

As of October 2024, the possibility of societal collapse became more probable, the number of articles speaking about climate change and societal collapse increased sharply. Leading climate scientists emphasize that ""Climate change is a glaring symptom of a deeper systemic issue: ecological overshoot, [which] is an inherently unstable state that cannot persist indefinitely". To prevent it, they propose phase down fossil fuels, reduce methane emissions, overconsumption, and birth rate, switch to plant-based food, protect and restore ecosystems and adopt an ecological, post-growth economics which includes social justice. Climate change education should be integrated into core curriculums worldwide.

== Economic impacts ==
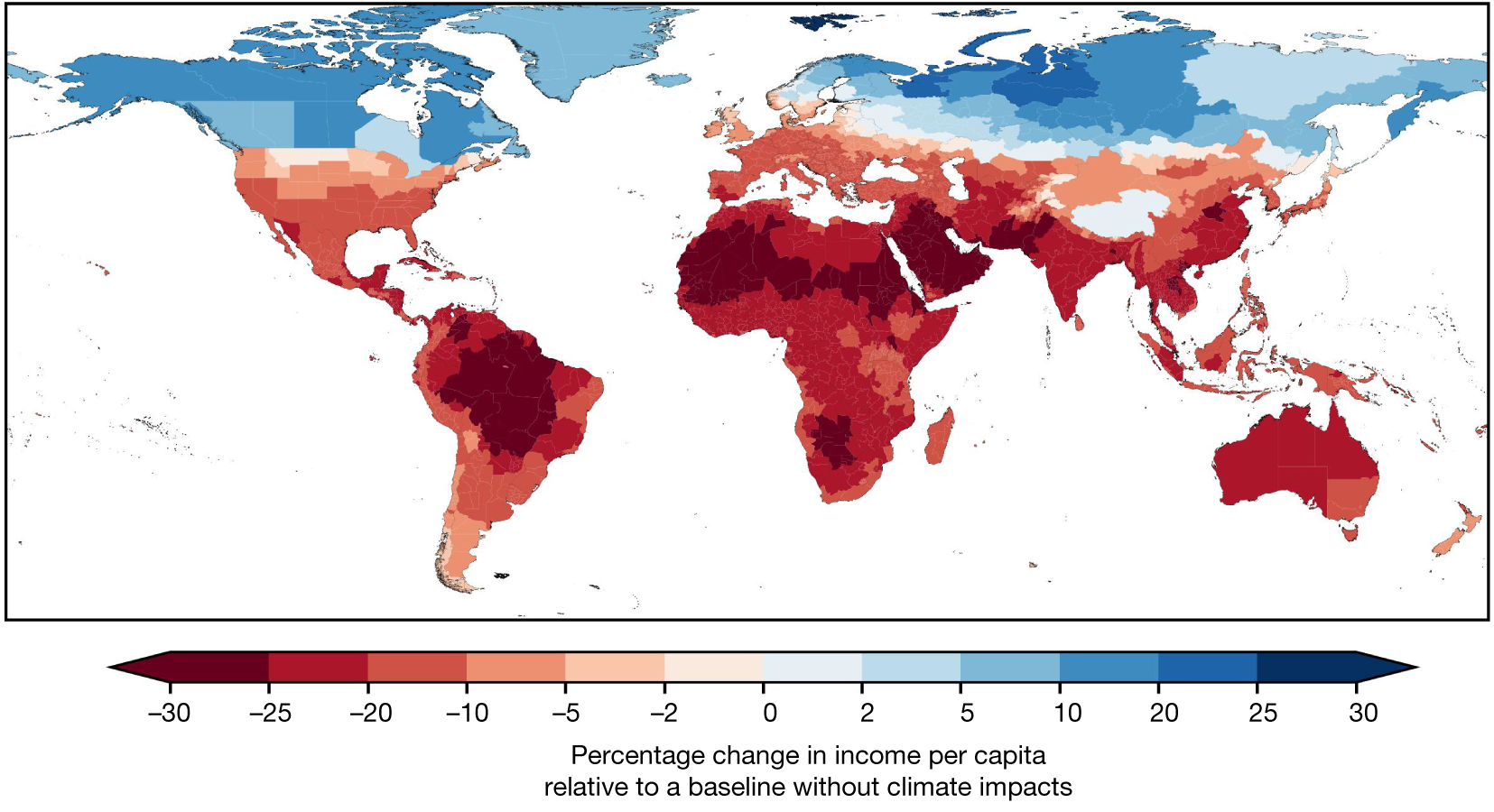
Regional median economic impacts predicted due to global warming by 2050 compared to present.

Non-linear growth in the global warming effect of accumulating long-lived greenhouse gases contributed to economic damages over a 60-year period estimated to be over five times as large as that of a 30-year period (shown in chart). A Nature article estimated future damages from past emissions to be at least an order of magnitude larger than historical damages from the same emissions.

Economic forecasts of the impact of global warming vary considerably. The impacts are worse if there is insufficient adaptation. Economic modelling may underrate the impact of catastrophic climatic changes. When estimating losses, economists choose a discount rate. This determines how much one prefers to have goods or cash now compared to at a future date. Using a high discount rate may understate economic losses. This is because losses for future generations weigh less heavily.

Economic impacts are bigger the more the temperature rises. Scientists have compared impacts with warming of 1.5 °C (2.7 °F) and a level of 3.66 °C (6.59 °F). They use this higher figure to represent no efforts to stop emissions. They found that total damages at 1.5 °C were 90% less than at 3.66 °C. One study found that global GDP at the end of the century would be 3.5% less if warming is limited to 3 °C (5.4 °F). This study excludes the potential effect of tipping points. Another study found that excluding tipping points underestimates the global economic impact by a factor of two to eight. Another study found that a temperature rise of 2 °C (3.6 °F) by 2050 would reduce global GDP by 2.5%–7.5%. By 2100 in this scenario the temperature would rise by 4 °C (7.2 °F). This could reduce global GDP by 30% in the worst case. A 2024 study, which checked the data from the last 120 years, found that climate change has already reduced welfare by 29% and further temperature rise will rise the number to 47%. The temperature rise during the years 1960–2019 alone has cut current GDP per capita by 18%. A 1 degree warming reduces global GDP by 12%. An increase of 3 degrees by 2100, will reduce capital by 50%. The effects are similar to experiencing the 1929 Great Depression permanently. The correct social cost of carbon according to the study is 1065 dollars per tonne of CO_{2}.

Global losses reveal rapidly rising costs due to extreme weather events since the 1970s. Socio-economic factors have contributed to the observed trend of global losses. These factors include population growth and increased wealth. Regional climatic factors also play a role. These include changes in precipitation and flooding events. It is difficult to quantify the relative impact of socio-economic factors and climate change on the observed trend. The trend does suggest social systems are increasing vulnerable to climate change.

A 2026 study published in Nature estimated that, from 1990 through 2020, carbon dioxide emissions in the US caused $10.2 trillion in cumulative damages by 2020, with about 30% occurring within the US itself. Damages from China were estimated at $8.7 trillion, and from the EU, $6.42 trillion. The researchers said that future damages from past emissions are at least an order of magnitude larger than historical damages from the same emissions.

=== Economic inequality ===
Rich nations have done the most to fuel climate change.

Climate change has contributed to global economic inequality. Wealthy countries in colder regions have felt little overall economic impact from climate change or may have benefited. Poor hotter countries probably grew less than if there had been no global warming.

=== Highly affected sectors ===
Climate change has a bigger impact on economic sectors directly affected by weather than on other sectors. It heavily affects agriculture, fisheries and forestry. It also affects the tourism and energy sectors. Agriculture and forestry have suffered economic losses due to droughts and extreme heat. If global warming goes over 1.5 °C, there may be limits to how much tourism and outdoor work can adapt.

In the energy sector, thermal power plants depend on water to cool them. Climate change can increase the likelihood of drought and fresh water shortages. Higher operating temperatures make them less efficient. This reduces their output. Hydropower is affected by changes in the water cycle such as river flows. Diminished river flows can cause power shortages in areas and countries that depend on hydroelectric power. Rising temperatures, lower water flow, and changes in rainfall could reduce total energy production by 7% annually by the end of the century. Climate change affects oil and natural gas infrastructure. This is also vulnerable to the increased risk of disasters such as storms, cyclones, flooding and rising sea levels.

Global warming affects the insurance and financial services sectors. Insurance is an important tool to manage risks. But it is often unavailable to poorer households. Due to climate change, premiums are going up for certain types of insurance, such as flood insurance. Poor adaptation to climate change further widens the gap between what people can afford and the costs of insurance, as risks increase. In 2019 Munich Re said climate change could make home insurance unaffordable for households at or below average incomes.

It is possible that climate change has already begun to affect the shipping sector by impacting the Panama Canal. Lack of rainfall possibly linked to climate change reduced the number of ships passing through the canal per day, from 36 to 22 and by February 2024, it is expected to be 18.

== See also ==
- Anthropocene
- Climate crisis
- Extinction risk from climate change
- Extreme event attribution
- Global catastrophic risk
- History of climate change science
- List of areas depopulated due to climate change
- Politics of climate change

== Sources ==
This article incorporates text from a free content work. Licensed under CC BY 4.0 (license statement/permission). Text taken from The State of the World’s Land and Water Resources for Food and Agriculture 2025, Food and Agriculture Organization of the United Nations (FAO).
