= Leah Namugerwa =

Ugandan climate activist (born 2004)

- Born: 2004 (age 21–22)
- Occupation: Climate activist

Leah Namugerwa (born 2004) is a youth climate activist in Uganda. She is known for leading tree planting campaigns and for starting a petition to enforce the plastic bag ban in Uganda. Following inspiration from Greta Thunberg, she began supporting school strikes in February 2019 with fellow Fridays for the Future Uganda organizer Sadrach Nirere.

Namugerwa spoke at the World Urban Forum in 2020 and was a youth delegate at COP25. Her uncle, Tim Mugerwa, is also a prominent environmentalist in Uganda.

== Climate activism ==
Namugerwa heard of Greta Thunberg and her Friday strikes in 2018. She was inspired to take similar action as Thunberg at 13, after she watched a local news report about mudslides and flooding in rural sections of the country. Namugerwa has since become a prominent young climate advocate and an integral member of Africa's most prominent chapter of Fridays for the Future, taking place in Uganda. She teamed up with Sadrach Nirere, Hilda Flavia Nakabuye, and her cousin Bob Motavu to create Fridays for the Future Uganda. She has been engaged in Friday striking since February 2019, calling for more climate actions, and she led the writing of a petition to enforce the ban of plastic bags.

Namugerwa uses social media to spread the message of how important it is to protect the planet. She posts photos of herself doing positive projects for the environment like planting trees. She encourages the youth to regularly plant trees and get involved in activities and projects that help to protect the environment.

== Accomplishments ==
Namugerwa celebrated her 15th birthday by planting 200 trees instead of throwing a birthday party. She launched the Birthday Trees project, to give out seedlings to those who wish to celebrate the same way.

Her goal is to see the enforcement of current climate legislation (Paris 21 Agreement) and to attract more coverage of issues of climate change. She organized marches along with other young climate advocates to mark the global climate strike on 29 November 2020, and the lakeshore of Kampala's Ggaba Beach was also cleaned to celebrate the day; Dorothy Nalubega, a member of a women's agriculturalist and environmental group, was also in attendance. Namugerwa has continuously called on the government of Uganda to fully implement the Paris Climate Agreement.

== Current life ==
Namugerwa continues to fight climate change by planting trees. She speaks at climate summits and conferences in Africa and around the world.

She attended the COP27 Climate Conference in Egypt. The United Nations Climate Change Conference or Conference of the Parties of the UNFCCC, more commonly referred to as COP27, was the 27th annual United Nations Climate Change conference. Its goal is to come together to support climate policies around the world that politicians and the general public can tackle together. Namugerwa spoke during the conference on November 7, 2022.

== Personal life ==
Namugerwa is a member of the Anglican Church of Uganda.
