= Yusuf Baluch =

Climate Justice and Human Rights Activist

- یوسف بلوچ
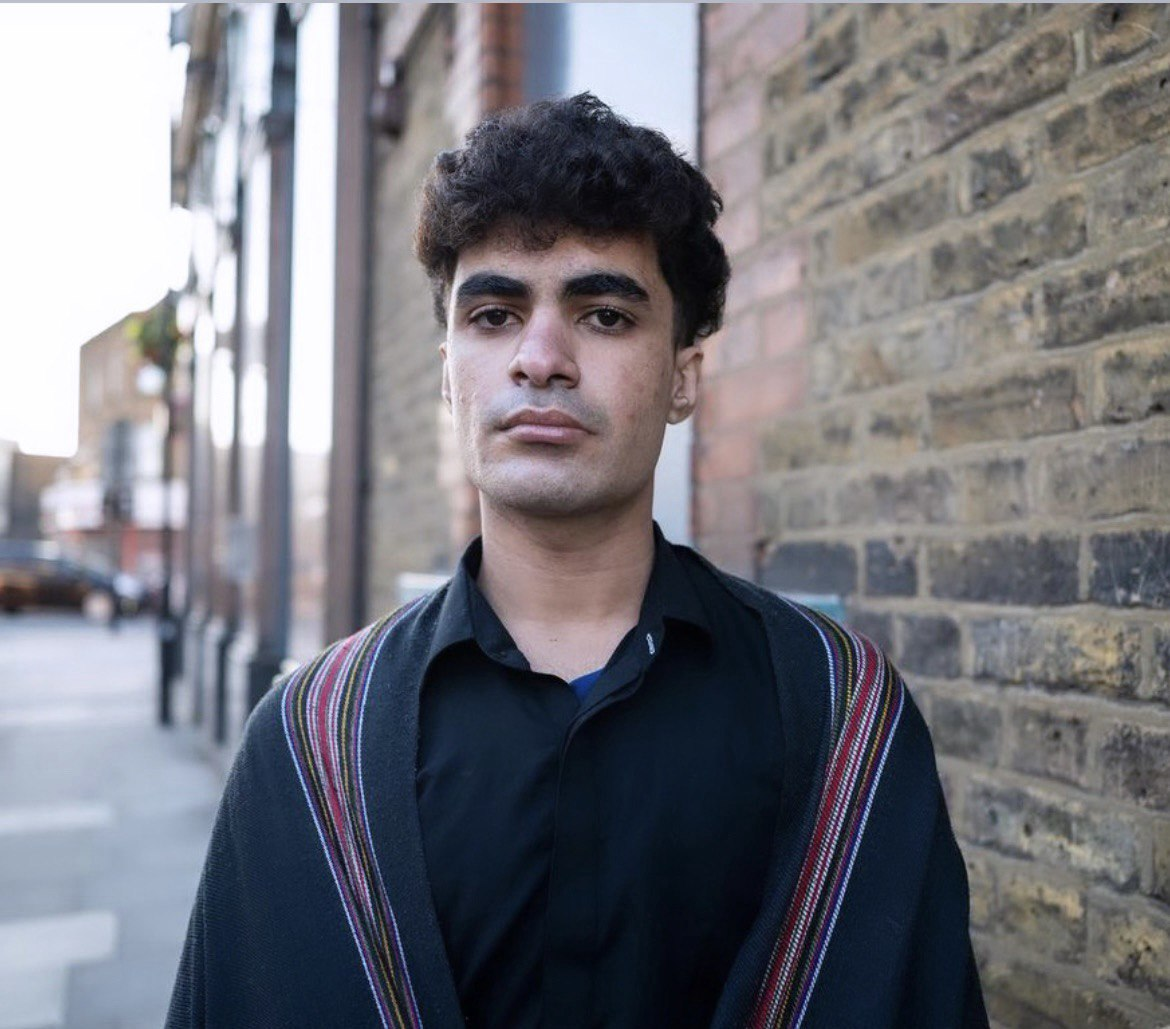
- Born: 2004 (age 21–22); Balochistan
- Years active: 2020-present
- Known for: Climate activism
- Movement: School Strike for Climate

Yusuf Baluch (Urdu: یوسف بلوچ; born 2004 in Kech, Balochistan) is an indigenous climate justice and human rights activist. He started activism after experiencing the first hand impacts of the climate crisis in his community. He is an organizer with School Strike for Climate where he organizes with the regional chapter of Fridays For Future Balochistan.

== Activism ==
Yusuf has been campaigning against the fossil fuels companies and banks such as standard chartered. He has also been vocal against the multi billion project between China and Pakistan CPEC due to its huge environmental impacts on indigenous communities in Balochistan. He attended COP26 along with other youth activists from MAPA (most affected people and areas) to make sure the most marginalised voices are at the table. He spoke at the overheated event, a six-day climate event in London presented by Billie Eillish during her Happier Than Ever World Tour.

He participated in the UNFCCC SB58 as a youth activist in Bonn, Germany. His presence aimed to drive impactful change by urging influential leaders to take urgent action. He advocated for a complete and urgent transition away from the fossil fuel industry. Through his advocacy, he highlighted the pressing need to address climate and related issues. He participated in the people's forum held in Basel, Switzerland, where numerous activists convened to advocate for an improved financial regulation system and to voice their protest against the Bank for International Settlements.

Yusuf Baluch, together with Maria Reyes and Eric Njuguna, organised various workshops discussing climate narratives and the decolonization of the climate movement in the global north, held across Germany, the Netherlands, and Sweden.

In September 2024, Yusuf participated in the 57th session of the UN Human Rights Council in Geneva, where he spoke at a side event, calling on states to take urgent action. Additionally, he addressed an event organized by the Baloch National Movement, highlighting the deep connections between the climate crisis and broader social injustices. Yusuf also pointed out that the climate crisis is a consequence of colonialism, leading to human rights violations like enforced disappearances, extrajudicial killings, and other abuses in Balochistan.

In November 2024, Yusuf Baluch attended COP29 in Baku, Azerbaijan, as a member of the Angry Alliance delegation. He delivered a speech during the People's Plenary, emphasizing the intersection of climate justice and human rights. The Angry Alliance is a coalition of grassroots youth organizations advocating for the inclusion of marginalized voices in climate negotiations.

Baluch's participation in COP29 aligns with his ongoing activism, which includes organizing with Fridays For Future and speaking at various international platforms to highlight the impacts of climate change on indigenous communities.

== Personal life ==
Yusuf grew up in a small village in southern Balochistan and then later moved to Gwadar. He lived in Gwadar before moving to United Kingdom in 2021.

== Threats ==
Yusuf's family lost their home in a flood when he was a child and they were forced to evacuate in the middle of the night, becoming one of the thousands of untold stories in Balochistan. In 2020, Baluch started Fridays For Future Balochistan and began organising weekly protests. However, after few months of peaceful protests, the Frontier Corps began pressuring the youth activist to stop. Baluch and the other Fridays for Future Activists were interrogated and threatened, forcing them to stop protesting publicly within Balochistan.

Later when Baluch started protesting weekly alone was reached out by the military again and threatened of abduction if he continues advocating for the climate and human rights.

Yusuf has been harassed and threatened several times for peacefully protesting and advocating for his rights.

Yusuf currently organises from London where he is able to speak and advocate for Climate Justice and human rights.
