= Khayelitsha Football for Hope Centre =

Khayelitsha Football for Hope Centre is the first Football for Hope project and was launched on 28 July 2008. The centre opened on 5 December 2009 in the Harare neighbourhood. It cost approximately US$256,000 and spans about 220 square meters. Khayelitsha is a township in the Western Cape of South Africa in Cape Town.

Football for Hope was made possible by Architecture for Humanity, FIFA’s 20 Centres for 2010 project, and streetfootballworld to create the centre in Khayelitsha, while Grassroot Soccer is the Centre Host organisation. Grassroot Soccer’s mission is: "Grassroot Soccer uses the power of soccer to educate, inspire, and mobilise communities to stop the spread of HIV." Football for Hope's mission is to use football as a vehicle for the encouragement of health, peace, rights of the children and a way to discourage discrimination. There are different programs that are orchestrated at each centre that promote these objectives. These programs encourage play in an architecturally sound and safe environment.

The location of the Centre plays an important role in its growing popularity and prevalence in Khayelitsha. It is located in an area where pedestrian traffic is heavy and common. This encourages frequent visitors to the Football for Hope Centre. It is placed in a convenient location in the Harare neighbourhood. Because Khayelitsha is the second largest township in South Africa, the location of this centre is strategic in that it can provide its resources to the vast youth and general population living in Khayelitsha.

== Programs ==
Through Grassroot Soccer, an NGO and Khayelitsha Football for Hope Centre's host organisation, individuals are trained in behavioural development through the use of football and use what they've learned to benefit children in different communities. Grassroot soccer provides programs used at Khayelitsha Football for Hope Centre. They are used to promote healthy living and HIV free lives. A programme put on by Grassroot Soccer is the "Skillz Programme." This programme is two hours, three times a week. In these two hours, soccer drills and games are run and "combined with specially-designed exercises to help young people understand and deal with HIV and AIDS." There are peer counsellors who take part in educating the youth of Khayelitsha in various ways. The games and drills they partake in are representative of positive behaviours and experiences. The youth take these experiences and understand the importance of living a healthy and fun life. 6,000 completed the Skillz Curriculum in the first year of Khayelitsha Football for Hope Centre's existence.

The Utshintsho programme was started at Khayelitsha Football for Hope Centre and is meant for children to be educated about drugs and alcohol abuse. Utshintsho means "transformation" or "change" in Xhosa.

The community aspect of Khayelitsha has become more apparent and tight knit since the construction of Khayelitsha Football for Hope Centre. It provides a healthy and safe environment for the community members (aimed at children from the ages of 12–18) to come together, learn and play. Through the involvement in football and the various programs at the centre, children are encouraged to refrain from dangerous behaviours and learn to explore and play as the alternative.

They also have HIV testing and counselling at the centre. They are set up rather frequently and encourage children to get tested as often as possible because the prevalence of HIV in the Khayelitsha community is incredibly high.

== Structure and Design ==
Urban Design Guidelines was a relevant source for arG Design, the firm that designed Khayelitsha Football for Hope Centre due to the location of the edifice. The prevalence of crime in Khayelitsha is high, therefore situating the building where all sides were visible and accessible was important to the design firm. Because the building is located on a very common road, there is interaction between the Khayelitsha community and the Football for Hope Centre. There is a courtyard in the centre, which is surrounded by a room with many purposes, namely recreationally and other services for the community. There is also a small kitchen, bathroom and changing rooms and an office.

The mission of the arG design team was to incorporate outdoor spaces that are conducive to a welcoming and comfortable environment. Khayelitsha Football for Hope Centre has many features that are sustainable and environmentally friendly, an element that was also important to the arG's design idea. This is incorporated into the design of the building and the turf. The features are as follows: The bricks used to construct the building are local, made in Cape Town, and use over 95% of recycled materials; the insulation of the building is important to endure the rain; the roof is made of iron from Cape Town and keeps the warmth of the edifice intact in the winter and provides a cooling effect in the hot summer months; the devices used (lights, toilets, showers) are all low cost and energy efficient; to support the essential diet and nutritional benefits for the children, a food garden was built on the edge of the site; fruit trees were planted to not only provide shade in the hot months for pedestrians but also provide citrus fruits to the community; rainwater is used for toilet water and is used in their irrigation plan; the centre is partially run on solar power; air conditioning is not used but rather the construction and design of the building provides natural cooling effects; and the building uses recycling.

== Outcomes ==
Since the construction of Khayelitsha Football for Hope Centre, there have been many positive outcomes and benefits to the Khayelitsha community. The children and adults of the community are tested frequently for HIV and AIDS, a service that was rare and largely unavailable to the neighbourhood prior to the construction and operation of Football for Hope in Khayelitsha.

In addition, 6,000 children and adolescents in the community graduated from the Skillz program, meaning that they are able to mentor and teach kids constructive information about how to stay safe and avoid dangerous situations. They also are able to incorporate play and fun into these mentoring sessions through football and exercise.

The community of Khayelitsha has also benefitted solely because there is a common space for everyone to come, share ideas, and play together. It has helped unite the large community of 1.2 million people.
