= Grassroot Soccer =

American nonprofit organization

Grassroot Soccer (GRS) is an adolescent health organization that leverages the power of soccer to equip young people with the life-saving information, services, and mentorship they need to live healthier lives.

== History ==
Grassroot Soccer became a registered 501(c)(3) charitable organization in 2002. Founder Tommy Clark conceived of the idea after playing soccer professionally in Zimbabwe where he witnessed both the devastation of HIV and the fanatical popularity of soccer. Together with a group of friends who had similar experiences, he and co-founders Methembe Ndlovu, Ethan Zohn, and Kirk Friedrich created Grassroot Soccer. The core group traveled to Zimbabwe in 2002 and with the support of advisory board member, Albert Bandura, consultants and local stakeholders, developed and piloted an interactive soccer-themed HIV prevention curriculum that was first implemented in Zimbabwe in 2003.

== Activities ==
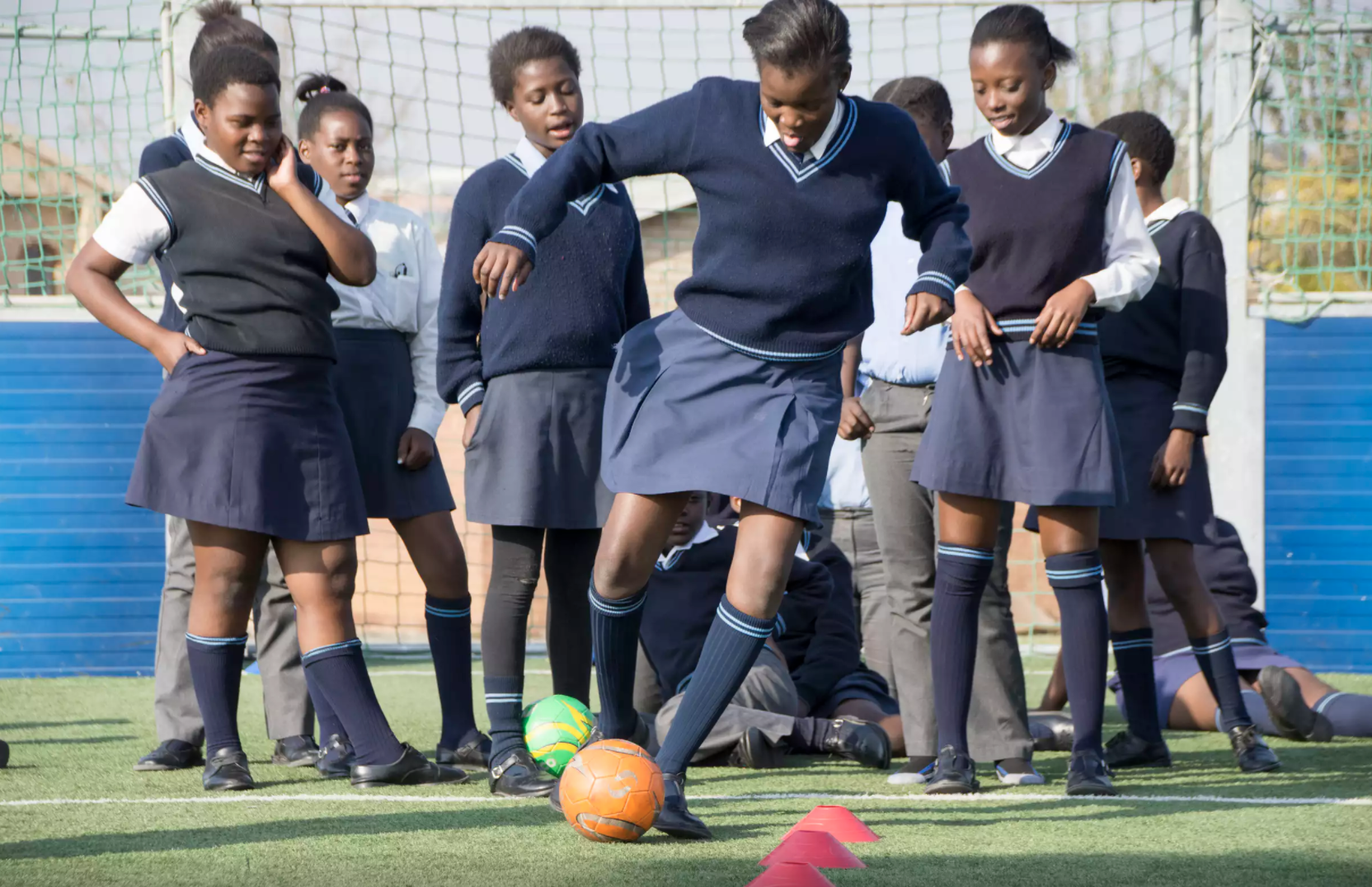
Adolescents in South Africa participate in a Grassroot Soccer SKILLZ activity.

Grassroot Soccer has partnered with corporations and organizations such as the United States Agency for International Development (USAID), the Bill & Melinda Gates Foundation, Elton John AIDS Foundation, Nike, and many others. When the International Federation of Association Football (FIFA) announced its 20 Football for Hope Centers, it chose Grassroot Soccer to run the first one, located in Khayelitsha, South Africa, a suburb of Cape Town. On July 13, 2010, Grassroot Soccer announced a partnership with Women's Professional Soccer in their initiative Get Active! which aims to fight childhood obesity throughout the country.

== Effectiveness ==
Studies by Stanford University's Children's Health Council, Johns Hopkins University, and the University of Cape Town, as well as others, suggest that the GRS curriculum is very effective. A study on GRS published in the British Journal of Sports Medicine concluded, among other things, that "over 90% of the children provided positive attitude responses to the health-education programme".
