= COSAT (disambiguation) =

COSAT may refer to:

- Centre of Science and Technology (COSAT)
- Confederacion Sudamericana de Tenis (COSAT)
- Johnson & Johnson's Office of Corporate Science & Technology (COSAT)
