= Bob Wigley =

English businessman

Robert (Bob) Wigley, OStJ, BSc, HonDBA, FCA, CCMI, is Chairman of UK Finance, a Non Executive Director of Altitude Group plc, Lightico Ltd and Sureserve Group, an Executive Member of Seraphim Space Enterprise LLP and is an investor, entrepreneur and philanthropist. He is an Honorary Professor of King's College London in the Digital Futures Institute. He is author of a book about the effects of technology on Gen Z, Born Digital: The Story of a Distracted generation. He is a member of the Trade Advisory Group for Financial Services at the Department for Business and Trade and a member of the UK's Economic Crime Strategic Board at the Home Office, co-chaired by the Home Secretary and Chancellor. He is a Trustee and Director of the UK's Museum of the Prime Minister.

Wigley was educated at Exeter School on a local authority grant.

He is Vice-Patron of the RMA - the Royal Marines Charity, supporter and adviser to St John Ambulance's development team. He sits on the Leadership Council of TheCityUK and on the advisory boards of Arva AI, Cap10 Partners LLP, Climate-X, Remora Ltd and Vidrate Ltd. He is a visiting fellow of Oxford University's Said Business School, and an honorary fellow of Cambridge University's Judge Business School. He is a Fellow of the Institute of Chartered Accountants, a Companion of the Chartered Management Institute and has a business degree and an honorary doctorate from the University of Bath. He was also co-proprietor of Margot Restaurant in Covent Garden. He is an officer of the Order of St. John. He is a Past Master and member of the Court Emeritus of the Worshipful Company of International Bankers. He is a Liveryman and Freeman of the City of London.

== Career ==
Between 2021 and 2026, he was a strategic advisor to Grant Thornton UK LLP. Between 2017 and 2026, he was a member of the Panel on Takeovers and Mergers. Between 2011 and 2026, he was a Non Executive Director of the Qatar Financial Centre and Chairman of its Audit Committee. He was a Founding Commissioner of the Global Britain Commission throughout its life. Between 2020 and 2024 he was an Ambassador for Nevill Holt Opera. Between 2018 and 2024, he was a member of the Corporate Board of Cancer Research UK. Between 2024 and 2025 he was a Senior Adviser to Oliver Wyman UK. Between 2023 and 2024 he was a member of the UK's Economic Crime Security Public Private Forum chaired by the Deputy Prime Minister and the Secretary of State for Business and Trade. Between 2023 and 2025, he was a Non Executive Director of R3 LLC. Between 2020 and 2023, he was an adjunct professor at the University of Queensland. Between 2021 and 2023 he was Chairman of Vizolution Ltd prior to its takeover by Lightico Ltd. Between 2015 and 2023, he was a Non Executive Director of Symphony Environmental Technologies plc. Between 2017 and 2023, he was Chairman of Vesta Global Holdings Ltd. Between 2015 and 2022, he was chairman of Bink (Loyalty Angels) Ltd. Between 2020 and 2022 he was an adviser to Ueni Ltd. Between 2019 and 2023, he was an adviser to Privately SA. During 2021, he co-chaired the Cross Markets Operational Resilience Group at the Bank of England. Between 2014 and 2021 he was a board member of Queens Club Ltd and chair of its estates committee. In 2019 he was appointed by the Secretary of state for Digital, Culture, Media and Sport as a member of the Tailored Review panel for Historic England and English Heritage. Between 2018 and 2019, Wigley was a commissioner of the Blockchain Commission for Sustainable Development at the United Nations. During 2017, as chairman of Victoria Beckham Ltd, he led an investment process securing £30m of venture capital to develop the business. Between 2012 and 2016, he was chairman of First Global Trust Bank plc. Between 2010 and 2016 he was chairman of Stonehaven Associates LLP. In 2015 and 2016, Wigley was an adviser to Exiger LLP. Between 2014 and 2016, he was chairman of Tantalum Corporation plc. Between 2012 and 2016, Wigley was chairman of NetOTC Services Ltd.

Between 2013 and 2017 Wigley was on the advisory board of Tetronics International Ltd. Between 2011 and 2018 he was a trustee of the Peter Jones Foundation. Between 2013 and 2018 he chaired the More Music Campaign for the Royal College of Music and sat on its council. He was an ambassador for UK Business for Prime Minister David Cameron in 2011. He chaired the UK Green Investment Bank Commission for the Chancellor of the Exchequer George Osborne during 2009/2010. In 2008, he chaired a panel of London financial services company CEO's for the incoming Mayor of London, Boris Johnson and produced a report on how to maintain London's global competitiveness and sat on the Mayor's Panel of Economic Advisers. In 2007, he authored a report for the prime minister on how to improve school governance, using lessons from the corporate world. He is a Past Master of the Court of the Worshipful Company of International Bankers. Between 2011 and 2014, he was a member of the international advisory board of British Airways.

He was a non-executive director of Royal Mail Group plc and chairman of its audit committee for three years. Between 2006 and 2009, Wigley was a member of the Court of the Bank of England and of its Risk policy and audit committees. Between 2009 and 2014, he served as Chairman of Yell Group plc (subsequently renamed Hibu plc) and of Expansys plc until they were both taken private. Hibu subsequently entered into administration to facilitate a consensual restructuring with its bondholders. Between 2009 and 2011, Wigley was the European Financial Services Operating Partner of Advent International. Between 2008 and 2011, he served as Chairman of the National Education Employer Partnership Taskforce. From 2009 until its takeover by Grainger plc in 2010, Wigley was Chairman of Sovereign Reversions plc. Between 2004 and 2010, he was deputy chairman of Business in the Community (the UK's leading corporate social responsibility organisation). Previous roles included serving as a Trustee of Terence Conran's Design Museum for seven years and a trustee of Whizz-Kidz for six years.

In January 2009, Wigley resigned as Chair of Merrill Lynch Europe, Middle East and Africa following the completion of its takeover by Bank of America. Since 2004, Wigley had chaired Merrill Lynch's EMEA Region Executive Committee with responsibility for a business with $6bn of revenue, $3bn of pretax income and 8,000 employees in 23 countries.

He sat on Merrill Lynch's Global Operating Committee and Client Coverage Council. During this time, he was a member of the Senior Practitioner Committee of the Financial Services Authority, the FSA's nominated representative on the Market Consultative Panel of the Committee of European Securities Regulators, sat on the boards of LCH.Clearnet plc (Chairing its nomination committee) and Euroclear plc (and its strategy committee), was a member of the Chancellor's "wise men" group representing key financial stakeholders in London, was a member of the chairman's Committee of the London Investment Banking Association, a member of the Panel on Takeovers and Mergers (and its remuneration committee) and on the EU Advisory Panel of the City of London Corporation.

Previous roles at Merrill Lynch included Chairman of European Investment Banking, Global Head of Telecoms, Media and Technology Investment Banking, Head of UK Investment Banking and Head of Corporate Broking.
