= Desmond Tutu TB Centre =

Tuberculosis research/treatment facility

The Desmond Tutu TB Centre, also referred to as the DTTC or Desmond Tutu Tuberculosis Centre, is a research facility committed to raising awareness about tuberculosis (commonly referred to as TB) and providing medical treatment and solutions to TB patients in South Africa. Founded in 2003 by Professor Nulda Beyers as the Centre for Tuberculosis Research and Education, the centre came under the patronage of Archbishop Desmond Tutu, Archbishop of South Africa and former TB survivor and, in 2005, changed its name to reflect the event. Since then, the DTTC has worked alongside Desmond Tutu to combat the health issue of TB in South Africa. It is currently directed by Professor Beyers.

The Desmond Tutu TB Centre's mission is to make an impact by linking medical research, community involvement, public policy, and training of professionals in the field; specifically, it seeks to increase public awareness and lessen the stigma associated with TB, promote TB prevention and adherence to treatment, and increase TB case detection at a community level. Its vision is a "TB-free world for the next generation."

== Location ==
The Desmond Tutu TB Centre operates primarily in Tygerberg, South Africa, with multiple temporary field sites all around the neighboring city of Cape Town where centre employees conduct research, as well as test and treat community members. The main campus, where most of the medical research is conducted, is located at the Tygerberg campus of the University of Stellenbosch.

== Vision ==
The centre dwells at the intersection of research, training, policy, and community. Having produced over 400 scientific publications, the DTTC puts forth much energy and effort to improve health through research. It also focuses on training numerous masters and PhD students, health care workers, Department of Health advisors by providing courses to enhance their knowledge of the status of TB in South Africa. Thirdly, with the help of international partnerships, the centre has changed world childhood TB drug guidelines and assisted with national and provincial TB and HIV policies. And finally, the centre's various field TB sites engage community members, create jobs, and strengthen the overall health system.

== Programs and projects ==
=== Community outreach ===
Kick TB – Started in 2010, the Kick TB! initiative takes advantage of South Africa's national preoccupation with soccer by printing TB facts and health care instructions on soccer balls. The initiative was widely successful, reaching over 55,000 primary school students. It has since been adopted by the Department of Health and also been implemented across the globe in countries like Ghana and India.

Emasithandane – The DTTC has partnered with the children's organization Emasithandane, which provides a safe haven for AIDS orphans. The centre has supported this cause by donating clothes, helping with cleaning and gardening, and renovating Mama Zelphina Maposela's (founder) house. Currently the DTTC is working together with Emasithandane to build another site for the organization in Philippi, Cape Town.

The centre is also involved in the community by participating in local events. In July 2012, the centre arranged a clothing, food, and toy drive for the children in Brooklyn Chest Hospital.

=== Medical research ===
Various medical studies are conducted in the centre, divided into two primary areas: pediatric TB and adult TB. Ongoing projects in both areas include investigation of how TB spreads in a community, diagnosis through different methods and new technologies, vaccinations, social factors, the effect of HIV, and access to care. Case-finding and tracking of the spread of the disease is another research emphasis.

=== Training ===
The DTTC also organizes programs that promote a unified approach to operational research. Through workshops, clinical forums, and the Operations Research Assistance Project (ORAP), the DTTC develops relationships between public health practitioners and South African researchers in each province and aims to deliver findings and services locally. Funded by USAID and supported by the International Union Against Tuberculosis and Lung Disease, ORAP has conducted two workshops since 2009 and submitted 10 research proposals.

== Involvement with Desmond Tutu ==
Desmond Tutu, previous archbishop of South Africa, is the patron of the TB centre. His involvement in the centre includes the community assistance project in 2010 where he read to students at the Tygersig Library. In March 2012 he joined the Cape Argus Pick n Pay Cycle tour, a fundraising event for the centre. He has also supported one of the centre's causes by donating to Emasithandane, a children's organization started by Mama Maphosela, who houses and takes care of AIDS orphans. The archbishop is currently working with the centre to build another site for the organization in Philipi.

== Partners ==
The Desmond Tutu TB centre has collaborated with the Department of Health in the past over certain projects like the Kick TB! initiative. The Bill and Melinda Gates Foundation has also worked with the DTTC on the ZAMSTAR project. Other partners include the Norwegian Scientific Council, USAID, URC, UBS Optimus Foundation, NIH, Thrasher research fund, Treat TB, Sir Halley Stewart Trust, South Africa Medical Research Council, the Center for Disease Control and Prevention, PEPFAR, and Elizabeth Glazer Pediatric AIDS foundation.
