= Funeka Soldaat =

South African lesbian activist

- Born: South Africa
- Occupation: Community activist
- Organizations: Triangle Project, Free Gender
- Known for: LGBTQ+ rights activism, founding Free Gender
- Notable work: Ndim, Ndim (It's Me, It's Me) (2005), I Am Woman: Leap of Faith (2013)
- Movement: LGBTQ+ rights, feminist activism

Funeka Soldaat is a lesbian community activist from South Africa, who works with the Triangle Project and is a founder of Khayelitsha-based lesbian advocacy group, Free Gender - both of which are non-profit, non-governmental organizations that benefit LGBTI individuals in South Africa.

A survivor of corrective rape, she advocates against gender violence and homophobia in her country. Soldaat spoke to a Khayelitsha commission of inquiry in January 2014 about the 1995 rape.

Free Gender calls out homophobic and racist symptoms of society and called for a boycott of the 2014 Cape Town Pride event, alleging racism, with Soldaat claiming that the event excludes women and nonwhites and instead targeting money strong white gay men. (Event director Matthew van As disputed her claim.)

Soldaat has been the subject of two short films, Ndim, Ndim (It's Me, It's Me), directed by Martha Qumbe in 2005, and Episode 2 of the SABC-commissioned series I Am Woman: Leap of Faith in 2013.

== Life and activism ==
Soldaat was inspired to create Free Gender after her own rape, and the murder of nineteen-year-old lesbian Zoliswa Nkonyana who was stoned and stabbed by a group of men in 2006. Soldaat's corrective rape occurred in 1995, not far from her home in Khayelitsha. When she went to the local police to seek aid and to report the crime, they were unhelpful. She said that "By the time it came for me to lay a complaint, a police officer looked at me from head to toe. He asked me what had happened. I told him I was raped. But what happened was he didn't take my statement and he went to talk to other police officers. They came and asked me what happened. It looked like they were considering my sexual orientation." She also experienced violence and abuse, later saying that “They [the police officers] threw me so hard into the jail cell, that my feet were no longer touching the ground.” Soldaat's attackers were never found.

As a result of this, she partnered with other women in her community to create Free Gender in 2008, to get justice for lesbians who have faced violence due to their gender and/or their sexuality. As a result, five years after the murder of Zoliswa Nkonyana, a verdict was reached and four men were sentenced to 18 years in prison.

Funeka Soldaat is also an advocate for women's education, and believes that one of the best ways to fight injustice is to be educated. “The only way to survive is to go to school,” said Soldaat.

In 2010 a member of Free Gender, Millicent Gaika was raped, beaten, and tortured for five hours by a neighbor who wanted to “cure” her of homosexuality, and in 2013, her attacker, Andile Ngocka was sentenced to 22 years imprisonment. "They know each other because Millicent grew up in front of that boy. And then we were so scared, because he can come back and finish up Millicent's life," said Funeka after the trial. The case seemed to give hope to other black lesbians living in townships, that other magistrates might rule in their favor.

In 2014, Funeka Soldaat announced that Free Gender would be boycotting the Cape Town Pride event because of its tendency to favor rich white men as opposed to reflecting the diverse community it represented, although Matthew Van As, the director of the event, disputed this claim. Many black lesbians, including Soldaat felt excluded by the Cape Town Pride celebrations saying that, “When we attended or participated, it was through invitation by a few white gay men who are gatekeepers in Cape Town Pride,” she said of the event. The controversy over the lack of diversity in Cape Town Pride Events and the white-male-centric running of the event is still an ongoing issue.

== Free Gender ==
Since its founding by Soldaat in 2008, Free Gender has grown significantly. It is now a blog, a home for black LGBTI women, and has worked to raise awareness of LGBTI individuals. They now enjoy strong relations with the local police of Khayelitsha, making it easier for victims to report harassment, violence, and other crimes. Some churches have even reached out to Free Gender to talk about LGBTI issues. They still fight for the rights of black Lesbians and other black LGBTI individuals, and are dedicated to opposing forms of violence and hate directed at the LGBTI community. Free Gender also supports the families of lesbian victims of violence. Their goal is to connect LGBTI individuals with their own community and to remove the stigma from homosexuality. "The organisation was established in Khayelitsha mainly because of the community's lack of understanding and its intolerance of LGBT lesbian, gay, bisexual and transgender people,” Soldaat later said of her organization's location. In 2016 they moved out of Soldaat's home and obtained an official office space located in Khayelitsha.

== The Triangle Project ==
Funeka Soldaat is also associated with the Triangle Project. This nonprofit is based in Cape Town, South Africa and offers resources and assistance to LGBTI people throughout the city. They offer three types of services; Health and Support, Community Engagement and Empowerment, and Research and advocacy.

Health and Support Services offers aid towards the health, mental and physical, of LGBTI people. It offers counseling and a clinic in order to support its community. Community Engagement and Empowerment aims to strengthen the communities of South Africa by creating and servicing safe spaces for LGBTI people. The Research Advocacy and Policy Program works to promote the rights of the community by transforming legislation and policy. The Triangle Project also works in tandem with the South African Department of Justice to fight for LGBTI legislation and protection in court cases and policies.
