= Andile =

Andile is a given name, derived from the Nguni word ukwanda/kwandile, meaning "to increase/multiply/to grow/expand.". Notable people with the given name include:

- Andile Dlamini (born 1992), South African footballer
- Andile Fikizolo (born 1994), South African footballer
- Andile Jali (born 1990), South African footballer
- Andile Jho (born 1992), South African rugby union player
- Andile Khumalo (born 1978), South African composer and music lecturer
- Andile Lili, South African Member of the Western Cape Provincial Parliament
- Andile Lungisa (born 1979), South African politician and the former deputy president of the African National Congress Youth League (ANCYL).
- Andile Mbanjwa (born 1998), South African professional footballer
- Andile Mngxitama, South African politician and the president of the Black First Land First party
- Andile Mokgakane (born 1999), South African cricketer
- Andile Ncobo (born 1967), South African footballer
- Andile Mzileni (born 2009), CEO of We Are Neighbors (WAN)
- Andile Ngcaba (born 1956), South African businessman
- Andile Phehlukwayo (born 1996), South African cricketer
- Andile Yenana (born 1968), South African pianist
