= WhizzKids United =

WhizzKids United is a youth HIV / AIDS prevention, care, treatment and support programme that uses football as an educational medium to facilitate healthy behaviour change. The programme is based in Durban, South Africa and is run by Africaid, a registered charity in the United Kingdom (Reg. No. 1045461) and South Africa (Reg. No. 051-379-NPO).

== Background ==
WhizzKids United was created by Marcus McGilvray, a Welsh HIV nurse specialist who worked with the KwaZulu-Natal Department of Health on the ARV roll-out. The programme is rooted in the Social Cognitive Theory of behaviour and was developed over several years of practical experience working with adolescents in KwaZulu-Natal. Studies have consistently found that KwaZulu-Natal has the highest HIV prevalence of any province in South Africa, with approximately 25% of the population infected in the 15–49 age group.

The programme was piloted in Edendale in 2006 and later expanded to Umlazi and Jozini in KwaZulu-Natal as well as Rustenburg in North West Province and areas of Western Cape province. The U.K. arm of the organisation also runs programmes in Ghana, Uganda and Australia, as well as in the United Kingdom itself at Premier League youth clubs in partnership with the Football Foundation.

== Programme Overview ==
WhizzKids United is an HIV prevention programme focusing primarily on Grade 6 and 7 students and consisting of three components. On the Ball is an eight-session curriculum which uses football drills and games to teach life skills interactively by using the game as a metaphor for life. This course is followed by peer education workshops focusing on sexual health. The long-term component of the programme is the Health Academy, a holistic adolescent-friendly sexual health clinic which offers free HIV testing, Antiretroviral treatment, Orphans and Vulnerable support and other services, along with recreational and educational activities such as football leagues and computer resource centres.

The programme recognises the gendered nature of HIV/AIDS in South Africa and as such includes gender equality as a central theme.

== Association with Football for Hope ==
Since 2007, WhizzKids United has been a member of streetfootballworld, a Germany-based worldwide network of youth development through football projects. streetfootballworld implements Football for Hope, the social responsibility movement of FIFA. In July 2010, WhizzKids United participated in the Football for Hope Festival 2010 in Alexandra, an official part of the 2010 FIFA World Cup.

In August 2010, FIFA announced that as part of the 20 Centres for 2010 campaign, FIFA has selected the WhizzKids United Health Academy in Edendale, KwaZulu-Natal to be one of the 20 Football for Hope Centres across Africa.

== Awards and Accolades ==
- The programme is enthusiastically endorsed by Dr. Bruce Walker of Harvard Medical School, one of the world's leading HIV/AIDS researchers.
- Boston Red Sox Owner John Henry visited and endorsed the programme in July 2009
- In March 2010, WhizzKids United won the award for Best Sport for Health project at the Global Sports Forum in Barcelona.
- In June 2010, WhizzKids United was formally endorsed by the United Nations in a letter from Wilfried Lemke, Special Advisor to the U.N. Secretary-General on Sport for Development and Peace. This endorsement was renewed in March 2012.
