= Chosa =

Chosa may refer to:

- Chōsa Station, a railway station of JR Kyushu Nippō Main Line in Aira, Kagoshima, Japan
- chosa herring, Clupea pallasii suworowi, a subspecies of the Pacific herring, Clupea pallasii
- a portable shrine in Japanese festivals
- Children of South Africa (CHOSA), nonprofit charity that locates and supports community-based organizations (CBOs) in South Africa which reach out and take care of orphans and other vulnerable children in South Africa
