= Mathare Football for Hope Centre =

Sports venue in Komarock, Nairobi, Kenya

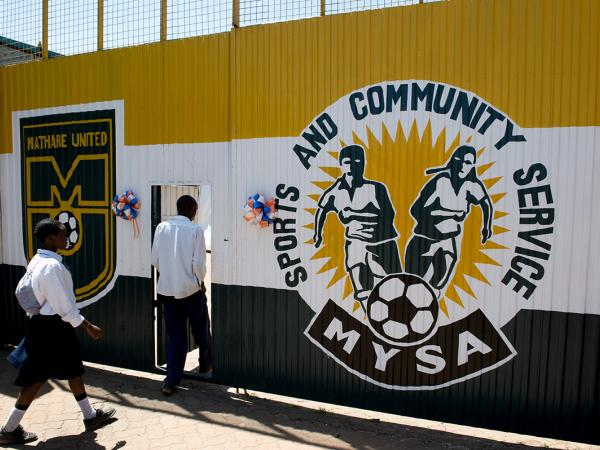
- Painted MYSA logo
- Formation: 2008
- Type: Football for Hope Centre
- Location: Nairobi, Kenya

The Mathare Football for Hope Centre is located on Kangundo Road, in Komarock, Nairobi, Kenya. Its host organisation is Mathare Youth Sports Association (MYSA).

== Description ==
The project started on 15 August 2008 and cost approximately US$120,000 at its conclusion. The physical structure covers 200 square metres (2,200 sq ft) and includes a youth centre, stadium/sports facility, health clinic and a community centre. The site's capacity is capped at 200. Beneficiaries include at-risk children from ten to eighteen years of age, and will be accessed by approximately 50,000 people of the greater Mathare community and surrounding areas.

The centre was made possible by "20 Centres for 2010", the official campaign of the 2010 FIFA World Cup South Africa. The entire campaign aims to address local social challenges in disadvantaged areas and to improve education and health services for young people through the creation of these centres. Each centre throughout Africa has its own local centre host organisation.

== Host organisation ==
MYSA, the centre's host organization, is located in Mathare, a collection of slums in Nairobi. The organisation is run by young people, aiding in their development in its fullest potential, and was founded with the intention to enhance their social proficiencies through the teaching of football.

The mission of MYSA is "Linking Sports, Community Leadership and Sustainable Development in Africa by: Creating opportunities for physical, personal and community development; Empowering young people and building their self-esteem; Empowering young people to become responsible citizens and environmental preservation experts".

The association has existed since 1987. It has expanded to a staff of 60 members and over 7,000 volunteers. In addition, the association is making notable strides in helping their local youth become responsible citizens.

MYSA has been awarded the UN Environment Programme 500 Award, Common Ground Award 2010 and Winners Beyond Sport Award – Leadership in sport Award Category 2011. It has been nominated for the Nobel Peace Prize twice.

== Design ==
As noted in MYSA's mission statement, one of the association's goals is to develop its youth into environmental preservation experts. The Mathare Football for Hope Centre chose to work with Studio 610 to design the space. It stated that its goal was "to provide a space that is functional, sustainable, cost effective, and that will become a beacon where the community can come together".

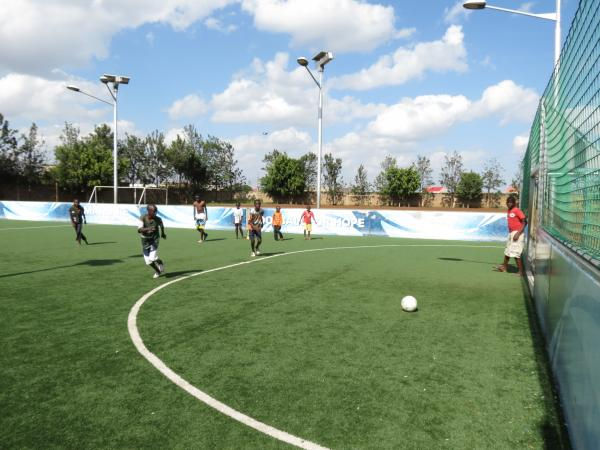
Turf was chosen as a low maintenance, cost saving, recyclable option.

The main building within the structure is formed by local stone masonry. The stone was kept its natural colour in order to symbolise the nature of Kenya. In turn, the interior walls are painted bright colours to symbolisze the heart and vibrancy of Kenyan culture. The intention of the colourful interior was for the colour to radiate through the large glass like a multicoloured lantern. The flat roof allows for the installation of solar panels and easy rainwater collection.

The architects of record for this project were Andrew Gremley and Pharos Architects.

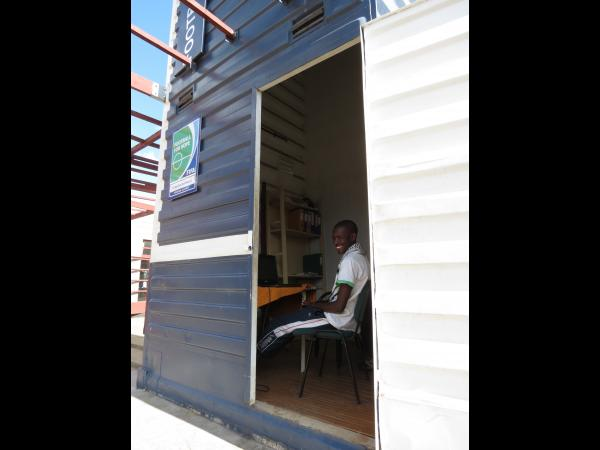
Studio 610 incorporated recycled shipping containers into the design of towers.

In order to incorporate the association's sustainability goals, Studio 610 included the following sustainability initiatives in their design of the centre:

- The building consists of stones hand cut from the local quarries of Nairobi.
- It is powered by low cost devices such as low energy light bulbs.
- It has block pavers that allow for proper drainage of rainwater into the ground.
- It consists of a rain water collection design in which the water is directed to a harvesting tank and/or the irrigation system.
- A high degree natural ventilation system so as to avoid the use of air conditioning
- A natural cooling system with a shading structure at the northern end of the building that will create air circulation for cooling the seating/step and plaza area
- Large glazed openings allow for the maximum use of daylight to ensure low use of artificial light.
- The shipping containers used to transport the turf have been recycled and reused as the tower element, and have been modified and incorporated alongside the field as an open shaded structure for gathering and storage.
- Low construction waste in which the contractor was committed to separating on-site waste and recycling
- The building is positioned strategically to ensure optimal daylight at all times as well as shading to prevent overheating.
- The fields have been dressed with artificial turf in order to lower maintenance costs, save water, and be completely recyclable.

The environmental consultant for this project was Dr. Alfred Omenya.

== Development ==
By July 2012, approximately 150 children were accessing the centre each week, 200 girls had been recruited for the centre's football league, six youths had been trained as HIV testing and counselling counsellors, 579 males and 478 females had been counselled and tested for HIV/AIDS, 120 boys and 108 girls had been recruited to the library programme and 59 youths had been trained on entrepreneurship and basic computer skills.
