= Yola Mgogwana =

South African climate activist

- Born: 2008 (age 17–18); Khayelitsha, Cape Town, South Africa
- Years active: 2019–present
- Known for: Young climate activist
- Notable work: She has been an inspiration for youth in Africa to join her in her fight for climate justice.

Yola Mgogwana (born 2008) is a South African climate activist from Khayelitsha, Cape Town.

Mgogwana's activism started in 2019, when she was just eleven years old, after she became concerned about pollution, unusual weather patterns, and a looming water crisis in her country. She has been an inspiration for youth in Africa to join her in her fight for climate justice. Along with Kiara Nirghin and Ruby Sampson, she has been hailed as South Africa's answer to Swedish climate activist Greta Thunberg.

== Life ==
Mgogwana was a student at Yolomela Primary School in Khayelitsha, one of Cape Town's most impoverished townships. She is currently a student at Curro. Her environmental educator is Xoli Fuyani, who is both a mentor and a key collaborator in her work, and is also the Environmental Education Coordinator at the Earthchild Project, a non-profit organization Mgogwana is connected with.

== Climate activism ==
Mgogwana has been an active presenter in schools and has repeatedly urged the South African government to take urgent action on climate change.

In January 2019, she began volunteering with the Earthchild Project Eco-Warriors, an afterschool program which aims to combine leadership training, life skills and environmental education. According to her, the irregular climatic condition in Khayelitsha, was a big sign that we need to change our ways and stand up for nature – because our government wants to profit from the environment, instead of implementing policies that protect it. The Earthchild Project is a non-profit organization aimed to bring environmental education into communities and classrooms that did not already have access to this knowledge.

In March 2019, she joined her first youth climate march outside Cape Town's Parliament demanding better policies and justice. During this event she spoke to an audience of 2,000 youth in Cape Town about climate justice.

In August 2019, she was a keynote speaker at the UNFPA's symposium on Sexual and Reproductive Health, Gender and Climate Change Resilience in Johannesburg. Her work fits within the increasing recognition amongst youth worldwide that their generation will face the most severe consequences of climate change, although they would have contributed little to the devastation of the environment. Her activism has been inspired by the Zulu word "Ubuntu", meaning "I am, Because you are".

As of 2022 and in conjunction with the African Climate Alliance, Vukani Environmental Justice Movement in Action, and groundWork, Mgogwana is currently involved with the youth-led #CancelCoal court case to prevent the South African government's coal fleet expansion in Mpumalanga.

== Media mentions ==
Mgogwana has received recognition in both national and international media as a notable young climate activist who parallels Greta Thunberg in South Africa.
