= Chris Hani Secondary School =

English-medium high school in Kheyelitsha, Cape Town, South Africa

Coordinates: 34°2′49″S 18°42′22″E

- Cape Town; South Africa

Information
- Type: English-medium school
- Established: 2006

Chris Hani Secondary School is an English-medium school located in Khayelitsha, a suburb of Cape Town, South Africa.

As of 2006 it had some 1,676 students and was staffed by 52 educators. In 2006 the Western Cape Education Department designated it one of 10 "Arts and Culture focus schools" to be set up over the following three years. School focuses on art, it is abbreviated as, CHACS, kind of an acronym which means Chris Hani Arts and Culture School
