= Murder of Zoliswa Nkonyana =

2006 murder in South Africa

- Location: Khayelitsha, South Africa
- Date: 4 February 2006
- Weapons: Golf clubs, bricks, knives
- Deaths: 1
- Victim: Zoliswa Nkonyana
- Perpetrators: Lubabalo Ntlabathi; Sicelo Mase; Luyanda Londzi; Mbulelo Damba
- Motive: Sexual orientation of victim
- Accused: 9
- Convictions: Murder
- Convicted: 4

Zoliswa Nkonyana (died 4 February 2006) was a South African woman who was murdered by a group of at least four men while walking home from a shebeen in Khayelitsha. In 2012, four men were found guilty of her murder. The verdict was noted as groundbreaking due to it explicitly stating that Nkonyana had been murdered due to her being a lesbian, a first in South African legal history.

== Context ==
During the 1980s, incidents of violence against women, including physical and sexual assaults, became more common in South Africa. Known as "jackrolling", it was summarised as men targeting a woman perceived to consider herself as "better than them" with the idea of beating and raping her to "teach them how to be proper women". This developed into attacking LGBTQ women in order to "correct" their sexuality, with the term "corrective rape" being coined to describe it. Corrective rape disproportionately impacts black women in South Africa, particularly in poorer townships.

In 2003, Human Rights Watch and the International Gay and Lesbian Human Rights Commission had published a joint report expressing concern for the safety of black and mixed race lesbians in South African townships, particularly in the context of increasing violent and sexual crimes against women more generally across the country. This was despite South Africa being at that time the only country in the world to have protection from discrimination on the grounds of sexual orientation enshrined in its constitution. Their report called on the South African government to undertake public education campaigns on sexual orientation and gender identity, as well as to develop more effective mechanisms to manage complaints and to combat discrimination and abuse.

== Murder ==
Nkonyana was 19 years old at the time of her murder and lived in Khayelitsha, a township near Cape Town in Western Cape. An only child, Nkonyana was an out lesbian and was reported to have been a football player.

On 4 February 2006, Nkonyana and a friend had visited Phela's Tavern, a shebeen in Khayelitsha when they were confronted by a woman who accused them of being "tomboys [who] wanted to be raped"; the allegation was reportedly triggered by Nkonyana and her friend using a women's bathroom. Nkonyana told the woman "we are not tomboys, we are lesbians. We are just doing our thing, so leave us alone" before attempting to leave the shebeen. The woman was reported to have called a mob totaling around nine men who pursued Nkonyana and her friend; while her friend was able to escape, Nkonyana was caught and beaten with golf clubs and stoned with bricks before being stabbed. She was attacked only ten feet away from her home. Nkonyana was transported to a local hospital, where she died of her injuries.

Nkonyana's funeral was attended by over 400 people, including her partner. On 19 February, a pride parade was held in the nearby township of Gugulethu in her honour, the first such parade to be held there.

== Investigation and trial ==
Nkonyana's death initially did not receive much media attention. Two weeks after her murder, a small article about the incident was published in the Sunday Times, including a photograph of Nkonyana and a female friend, who subsequently had to go into hiding due to concerns for her safety. Following this, a larger story was published in Mail & Guardian following a request from the Triangle Project, a local LGBTQ non-governmental organisation, following which Nkonyana's murder got wider publicity. Human Rights Watch, an international human rights organisation, called on the South African government to ensure a "thorough, effective and capable" investigation into Nkonyana's murder, criticising the "egregious assaults" against lesbians in South Africa. They also called for protection to be offered to Nkonyana's friends, who had reported being harassed following her murder.

Six men were subsequently arrested and charged with Nkonyana's murder, with it being reported that the men had admitted to having killed her due to her being a lesbian. Despite the arrests being made, and the men entering pleas by 27 August 2008, a trial did not start until 2011, making it one of the longest-running trials in South Africa. It was reported that between 40 and 50 postponements had been made due to issues including the main witness being physically attacked and fleeing the area; the state failing to ensure other witnesses were present; defence attorneys not attending hearings; and four of the detainees briefly escaping from prison in 2010. The Social Justice Coalition, Treatment Action Campaign, Free Gender, the Triangle Project and Sonke Gender Justice lobbied and held protests to bring about a trial.

In 2011, the trial into Nkonyana's death started at Khayelitsha Magistrates' Court with seven total defendants, before Raadiya Whaten. On 7 October, four of the men were found guilty of her murder. In February 2012, the men—Lubabalo Ntlabathi, Sicelo Mase, Luyanda Londzi and Mbulelo Damba—were sentenced to 18 years' imprisonment for Nkonyana's murder, with four years suspended due to time already served. Five men were acquitted. A crowd outside the court room reportedly "cheered, sang, raised their fists and danced" when the guilty verdict was announced.

Judge Whaten concluded that "[t]he court has a duty to enforce the ideology that violent intolerance of difference, whether it be based on race, whether it be based on sex, whether it be based on religion, [whether it be based on sexual orientation], it will not go unpunished and it will not go rewarded", and added that it was clear that the killing was driven by "hatred and intolerance". Nkonyana's family welcomed the verdict, telling The Sowetan that the men had not taken any responsibility for what they had done, though it was reported that their families had "expressed empathy" for Nkonyana and her family.

== Legacy ==
The sentence against Nkonyana's murders was described as "highly significant" due to the magistrate concluding that she had been killed because she was a lesbian. The South African Press Association stated that the sentence sent out a "signal that violence based on sexual orientation would not be tolerated".

The Triangle Project, which had lobbied for Nkonyana's killers to be brought to justice, described the sentence as a "good move" and setting a precedent due to it being the first time hate and intolerance on the grounds of sexual orientation had been acknowledged as an aggravating factor in a murder trial.

The Commission for Gender Equality described the court's ruling as a lesson to perpetrators of homophobic violence and vowed to continue to work to stop the "continued violation of gays' and lesbians' rights".

A spokesperson for the National Prosecuting Authority stated "we are happy that the court agreed with us that these gentleman did not show any remorse and had a slim chance of being rehabilitated".
