= Khayelitsha tavern shooting =

2020 shooting in Cape Town, South Africa

- Location: 34.0239°S 18.6736°E; Sihawu Crescent, Site B, Khayelitsha, Cape Town, Western Cape, South Africa
- Target: Employees and patrons
- Attack type: Mass shooting
- Deaths: 7
- Injuries: 7

The Khayelitsha tavern shooting was a mass shooting which occurred on the morning of 8 March 2020, killing seven people and injuring a further seven people.

== Background ==
Khayelitsha residents were found to not trust the police. Extortion activity by gangs in endemic in the town and it is more difficult to stop it than in other places because gangs have 'become entrenched in some important areas'. The senior advisor to the Global Initiative Against Transnational Organized Crime, Peter Gastrow, said that the police had failed to properly find and investigate cases of extortion. A representative for the Western Cape provincial government stated there were fifteen previous mass shootings in the area that had similarities with this event.

== Shooting ==
It took place at a tavern in Khayelitsha, South Africa. and resulted in the deaths of seven people and injured an additional seven, including a six-year-old girl. The owner of the tavern was holding a birthday party when gunmen stormed the tavern and began shooting.

== Investigation and trial ==
The body of the seventh victim, the owner of the house the tavern was based in, was found a short while later at another location. A 32 year old suspect allegedly involved in the shooting was arrested the following day. A representative for the Western Cape provincial government stated there were fifteen previous mass shootings in the area that had similarities with this event.

A witness known only as 'Mr X' and two others went to the police to give a statement, and he saw two police officers known to be affiliated with 'The Guptas' gang there. The witnesses decided against giving their statements because the informants for 'The Guptas' were 'hovering' over the witnesses. According to Mr X, those police officers tipped off the gang, who started searching for him in Khayelitsha. Police planned to take Mr X to the Eastern Cape, where he could live with family, but members of 'The Guptas' gang visited Mr X's family members in a rural village in the Eastern Cape. While he was being driven to the village, his aunt called him and told him that members of the gang were looking for him in the village, which led to him being placed into a witness protection programme.

Gcinithemba Beja and Fundile Maseti, both members of 'The Guptas' gang, were convicted of seven counts of murder, three counts of attempted murder, and criminal possession of a weapon and were sentenced to 14 life terms each for carrying out the massacre. They were known to extort protection fees from local businesses.

Daniel Thulare, the judge presiding over the case, stated in his verdict that:

Both accused had no remorse. They had no pain of conscience for the plight of the deceased, the injured or the fear which gripped the community of Khayelitsha and beyond. They had no appreciation of the extent of their error. They demonstrated no action which manifested feelings of sorrow and regret for having done wrong. The viciousness of the deeds of the accused resulted in heinous offences. The accused took more than one life in a very callous manner, to instill fear so that they become unstoppable, to support their greed.

== Responses ==
Tina Joemat-Pettersson, the chairperson of the Portfolio Committee on Police of the National Assembly of South Africa, called the perpetrators of the massacre 'monsters' and said that the shooting had 'horrified' her. Khayelitsha Development Forum chairperson Ndithini Tyido said that 'we appreciate the speedy arrest, and we hope more will be arrested and harsh sentences will be handed down.' The Western Cape Community Police Fund chairperson, Fransina Lukas, 'called on the SAPS to "clean up" their police stations.'
