= Mandela Park =

Suburb of Cape Town, in Western Cape, South Africa

- Location within Western Cape Location within South Africa
- Coordinates: 34.049°S 18.686°E
- Country: South Africa
- Province: Western Cape
- Municipality: City of Cape Town
- Main Place: Khayelitsha, Cape Town

Area
  - Total: 1.86 km^{2} (0.72 sq mi)

Population (2011)
  - Total: 18,747
  - Density: 10,100/km^{2} (26,100/sq mi)

Racial makeup (2011)
  - Black African: 98.67%
  - Coloured: 0.63%
  - Indian/Asian: 0.04%
  - White: 0.01%
  - Other: 0.64%

First languages (2011)
  - isiXhosa: 89.73%
  - English: 3.38%
  - Sesotho: 1.66%
- Time zone: UTC+2 (SAST)

Mandela Park is a neighborhood in the Khayelitsha urban area of the City of Cape Town in the Western Cape province of South Africa. It was established in 1986 under the apartheid era government of P.W. Botha as a residential area for black South Africans moving to Cape Town from the Eastern Cape province. It was one of the few areas in South Africa in the 1980s where black South Africans could purchase homes with bank loans. Many of the streets in the neighbourhood are named after anti-apartheid activists. The Mandela Park Backyarders association is based in the community.
