= Emasithandane =

Emasithandane Children's Project
- Founder: Mama Zelphina Maposela
- Type: Charity
- Purpose: Orphaned and children's rights
- Location: Block 6 No 3 Sithandatu Ave, Mthandeki Street, Nyanga East, 7755, Cape Town, South Africa
- Region served: Nyanga, Cape Town, South Africa
- Key people: Hazel Maposela (administrator)
- Employees: 10
- Website: emasithandane.org.za

Emasithandane Children's Project (also known as Emasithandane) is a home for orphaned and other vulnerable children in Nyanga, Cape Town, South Africa, one of the poorest townships in the city. About 25 children live in the home. It was founded by Mama Zelphina Maposela, who moved to Nyanga from the Eastern Cape to help address the orphan crisis in the area. Emasithandane has partnered with organizations such as the Desmond Tutu TB Centre, CHOSA, and People Environmental Planning.
