= Khayalethu Anthony =

South African actor

- Born: 15 July 1986; Khayelitsha, South Africa
- Died: 29 September 2022 (aged 36); Cape Town, South Africa
- Occupations: Actor, Writer, Director
- Years active: 2011–2022

Khayalethu Anthony (15 July 1986 – 29 September 2022) was a Xhosa writer, director and actor, most famous for playing the role of Militant Prisoner on Mandela: Long Walk to Freedom, Reyka and Shepherds and Butchers.

== Career ==
In 2011, Khayalethu Anthony marked his entrance into the professional acting arena with his debut performance in Lara Foot's theatrical drama, Solomon and Marion, which premiered at Cape Town's Baxter Theatre. Following this, in 2012, he ventured into television with his debut role as a security guard in an episode of SABC 1's romantic comedy-drama series, Forced Love. The year 2013 saw his film acting debut in the notable production Mandela: Long Walk to Freedom.
