= QQ Section =

Informal settlement in Khayelitsha, South Africa

QQ Section also known as Tambo Park, was founded in 1989 and is an informal settlement in the Site B sub-division of Khayelitsha in Cape Town, South Africa.

== Structure and location ==
There are about 650 families living in QQ Section in Cape Town, South Africa. It is occupied mostly by migrants from the Eastern Cape and backyard-dwellers from the old overcrowded sections of Khayelitsha. It is located on land owned by Eskom beneath power lines.

== Conditions ==
The informal settlement is well known as one of the most under-served and neglected communities in Cape Town. It has no services except for eight water taps. The city has refused to build toilets in the settlement and residents have to either pay homeowners in Q Section to use their facilities or cross the N2 freeway and use an open field. Despite living under electricity pylons, government refuses to install formal electricity in the community. Residents instead have to resort to illegal electricity connections. As a result, there have been shack-fires in the community.

== Protests ==
QQ Section is collectively affiliated with the movement Abahlali baseMjondolo which has an office in the settlement It has been on the forefront of various protest actions led by concerned residents and Abahlali baseMjondolo of the Western Cape. These protests have been in response to the refusal of government to provide the community with services, the slow pace of relocation of residents and the lack of engagement from government. Protests by the community have included marches to the Mayor and Premier, civil disobedience and road blockades.

== NGOs and Research ==
QQ Section has been the site of intervention by a number of NGOs. Most prominent is the work of the NGO CHOSA, which supports a community-run daycare centre inside the settlement. It has also been the site of academic research because of its role as part of Abahlali baseMjondolo in leading various prominent protests and strikes in the Khayelitsha area.
