= COSAT =

Western Cape high school

Centre of Science and Technology
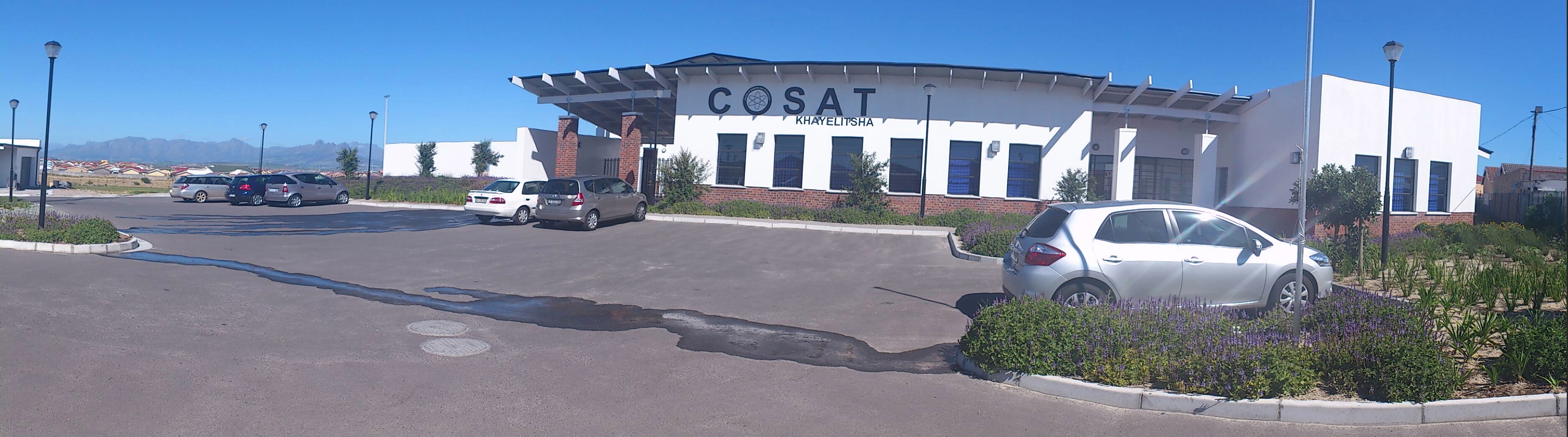

Location
- 50 Sinqolamthi Street, iLitha Park, Khayelitsha; Cape Town, Western Cape, 7784; South Africa

Information
- Other name: COSAT
- Type: Public
- Motto: No Excuses, Just Success!
- Established: 1999 (26 years ago)
- Oversight: Science Education Resources Initiative (SERI)
- Grades: 8–12
- Language: English
- Colours: Blue, Black and White
- Website: cosat.co.za

Centre of Science and Technology (COSAT) is the first of three STEM schools in Khayelitsha, Cape Town, Western Cape, South Africa. It was established in 1999. (Note: The other two existing schools are the Cape Academy in Tokai and the new Claremont High School.)

== Campus ==
Since April 2011 COSAT is located in iLitha Park, Khayelitsha. In addition to its classroom, library and hall, the school building has labs for Physical Science, Information Technology, Life Science, and Computer studies. The school capacity is 550 students.

The campus receives funding from the Upstream Training Trust, which was established by the Petroleum Agency SA and South African offshore oil and gas companies in 1997.

== SERI ==
The school is overseen by the non-profit organization Science Education Resources Initiative (SERI), which was established in August 2004 to improve the quality of Khayelitsha, South Africa's science and mathematics education.

== Academics ==
In 2012 COSAT was the first township school to make the provinces’ top ten list for the 2011 matric exams. Since its inception in 1999, the school has had a 100% matric pass rate every year except 2009. The school was placed in the ninth position, amongst the most elite schools in the Western Cape.

The school, which follows the national curriculum, teaches students from grades 8 to 12. Students enter the school at grades 8 and 10. The curriculum for grades 10 to 12 includes: isiXhosa Home Language, English First Additional Language, Mathematics, Physical Science, Life Science, Information Technology (Delphi Programming and Java) and Life Orientation. An optional class is IEB Advanced Program Mathematics.
