= Khayelitsha =

Suburb of Cape Town, in Western Cape, South Africa

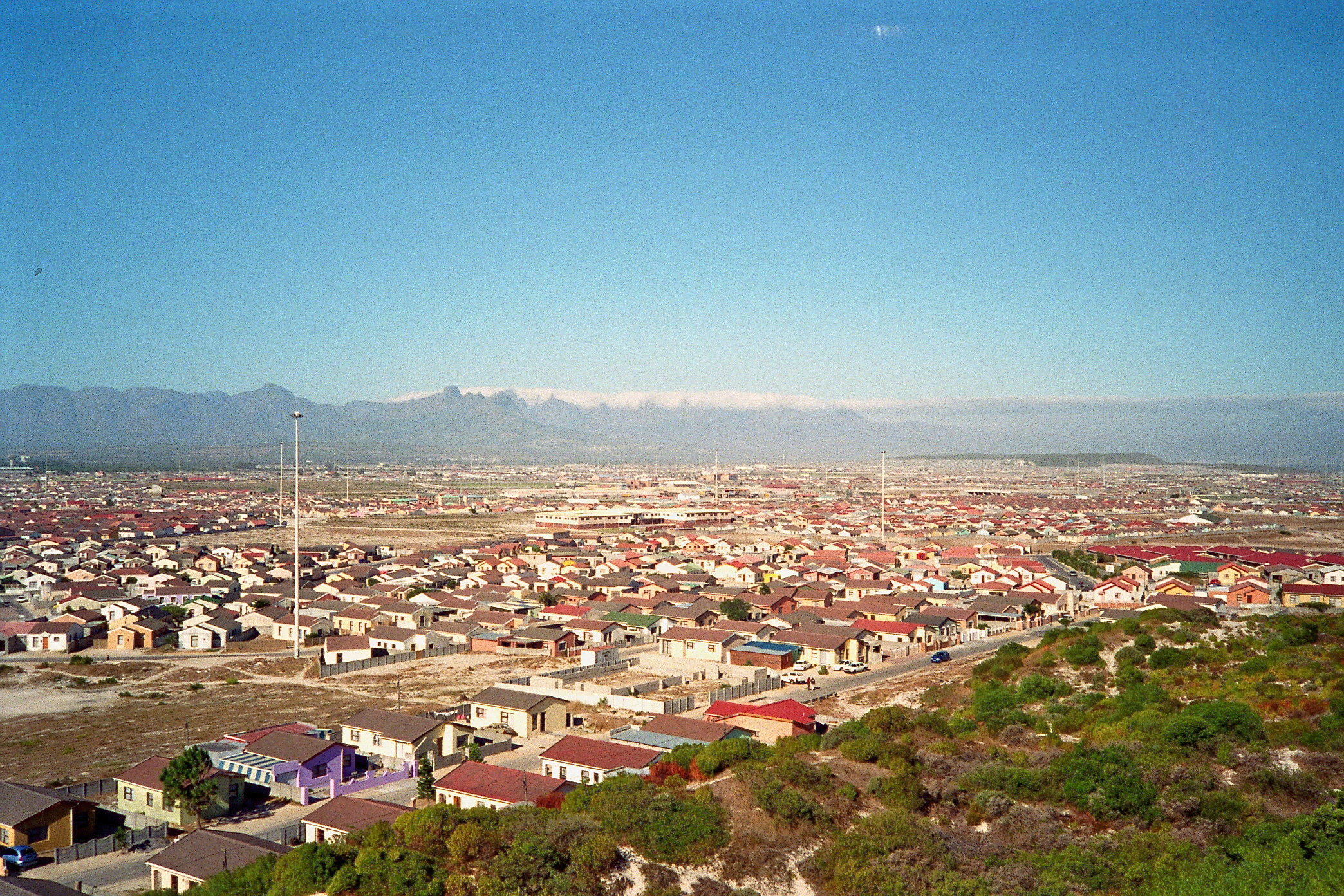
- Khayelitsha looking east, from Lookout Hill over Ilitha Park

- Location within Western Cape Location within South Africa Location within Africa
- Coordinates: 34°02′25″S 18°40′40″E
- Country: South Africa
- Province: Western Cape
- Municipality: City of Cape Town

Area
  - Total: 38.71 km^{2} (14.95 sq mi)

Population (2011)
  - Total: 391,749
  - Density: 10,120/km^{2} (26,210/sq mi)

Racial makeup (2011)
  - Black African: 98.6%
  - Coloured: 0.6%
  - Indian/Asian: 0.1%
  - White: 0.1%
  - Other: 0.6%

First languages (2019)
  - Xhosa: 90.5%
  - English: 3.2%
  - Sotho: 1.4%
  - Afrikaans: 1.1%
  - Other: 3.8%
- Time zone: UTC+2 (SAST)
- Postal code (street): 7784
- PO box: 7783

Khayelitsha (/ˌkaɪ.əˈliːtʃə/) is a township in Western Cape, South Africa, on the Cape Flats in the City of Cape Town Metropolitan Municipality. The name is Xhosa for New Home. It is reputed to be one of the largest and fastest-growing townships in South Africa.

== History ==
Cape Town initially opposed implementing the Group Areas Act passed in 1950, and residential areas in the city remained unsegregated until the first Group Areas were declared in the city in 1957. When Cape Town finally started implementing the Group Areas Act, it did so more severely than any other major city; by the mid-1980s, it had become one of the most segregated cities in South Africa.

Plans to build Khayelitsha were first announced by Dr Piet Koornhof in 1983, then Minister of Co-operation and Development. By 1985, the suburb Site C had 30,000 people. Khayelitsha was one of the apartheid regime's final attempts to enforce the Group Areas Act and was seen as the solution to two problems: the rapidly-growing number of migrants from the Eastern Cape, and overcrowding in other Cape Town townships.

The discrimination and black population control by the apartheid government did not prevent black people from settling in the outskirts of Cape Town. After the scrapping of pass laws in 1987, many black people, mainly Xhosas, moved into areas around Cape Town in search of work. By then, many black people had already illegally settled in townships like Nyanga and Crossroads. In 1983 and 1984, conditions in squatter camps like Crossroads and KTC worsened, and were exacerbated by official policing policy, in which homes were destroyed, and also by the emergence of the Witdoeke, led by "Mayor" Johnson Ngxobongwana. The Witdoeke were actively supported by the apartheid government in its fight against the ANC-aligned UDF, which had actively opposed plans for people to be moved to the new township of Khayelitsha. As the black population grew, the apartheid regime sought to solve the "problem" by establishing new black neighbourhoods. Khayelitsha was established in 1985 and large numbers of people were forcefully relocated there, mostly peacefully but occasionally with violence.

The Western Cape was a preference area for the local coloured population, and a system called "influx control" was in place to restrict Xhosas from travelling from the Transkei by requiring a permit. After the historic 1994 elections, hundreds of thousands moved to urban areas in search of work, education or both. Many of them erected shacks made of tin, wood and cardboard.

== Demographics ==
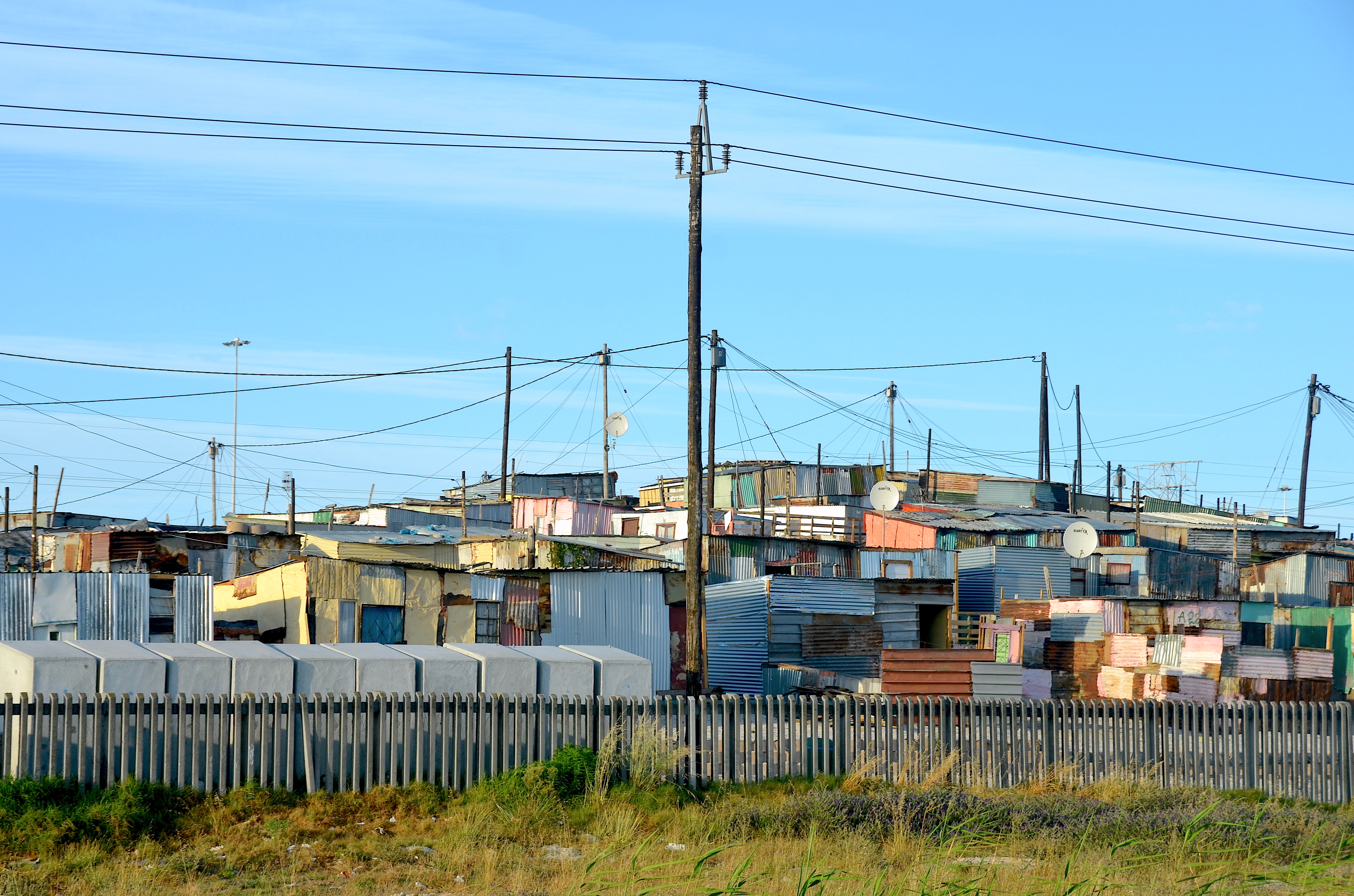
Khayelitsha along N2 road (2015)

According to the 2011 census, Khayelitsha has a population of 391,749. In 2018, according to Dr Gio Perez, Chief Director for Metro Health Services, it is estimated the population has grown to just under 500 000 people. There is a lot of controversy around Khayelitsha demographics data, with some inaccurate claims that it is inhabited by in-between 1M and 2.4M people.During a commission of inquiry in 2014, Prof. Charles Simkins, a leading South African demographer who served on the Statistics Council for a decade, defended the census data and its methodology which evaluated that the number of inhabitants was between 370 000 and 426 000 in 2011. With the support of Prof. Jeremy Seekings, and by corroborating this data with the numbers of paid social grants provided by the South African Social Security Agency (SASSA), they concluded that their figures should be accepted as “substantially accurate”.

The ethnic makeup of Khayelitsha is approximately 99.5% Black African, 0.47% Coloured and 0.03% White, with Xhosa being the predominant language of the residents. Khayelitsha has a very young population, with fewer than 7% of its residents being over 50 years old and over 40% of its residents being under 19. In 2011, around 62% of residents in Khayelitsha were rural to urban migrants, most coming from the Eastern Cape. In the communities of Enkanini and Endlovini, over 85% of the residents were born in the Eastern Cape.

About 75% of residents identify themselves as Christian, and about 20% follow traditional beliefs; a small minority of residents identify themselves as Muslim.

Khayelitsha is one of the poorest areas of Cape Town, with a median average income per family of R20,000 (US$1,872) a year, compared to the city median of R40,000 (US$3,743). Roughly over half of the 118,000 households live in informal dwellings.

- Area: 43.51 square kilometres (16.80 sq mi)
- Population: 391 749: 7,561.99 inhabitants per square kilometre (19,585.5/sq mi)
- Households: 118,809: 1,976.31 per square kilometre (5,118.6/sq mi)

Gender	Population	%
Female	170,908	51.95
Male	158,094	48.05

Race	Population	%
Black	327,322	99.49
White	87	0.03
Coloured	1,556	0.47
Asian	33	0.01

First language	Population	%
Zulu	1,176	0.36
Xhosa	318,389	96.77
Afrikaans	2,297	0.7
Northern Sotho	135	0.04
Tswana	427	0.13
English	784	0.24
Sotho	4,753	1.44
Tsonga	61	0.02
Swazi	348	0.11
Venda	117	0.04
Southern Ndebele	155	0.05
Other	361	0.11

== Conditions ==
Khayelitsha is one of the top five largest slums in the world. Since the ruling ANC came to power in the country in 1994, the party claims that living conditions in the township have improved markedly. There have been many developments, such as new brick housing and new schools being built and the creation of a central business district in the township. However, many residents strongly dispute the claim that the quality of life has improved and claim that crime rates remain very high and that only a few residents see improvements as a result of infrastructure and welfare interventions. The Khayelitsha Commission was established by the provincial government to investigate allegations of inefficient policing in Khayelitsha and a breakdown in the relationship between the police and the community.

Around 70% of residents still live in shacks, Around 53% of Khayelitsha's total working-age population is employed. The five most common forms of employment are domestic work (19.4%), service work (15.2%), skilled manual labour (15.2%), unskilled manual labour (11%) and security services (10.4%). Some 89% of households in Khayelitsha are either moderately or severely food insecure.

The 2001 census recorded that two thirds of residents lived in shacks. By 2011, the number of people living in formal housing had increased to almost half of them because of roughly 25,000 new houses being built between 2001 and 2011.

in 2013, on New Year's Day, the township experienced a fire that resulted in the deaths of three people, with 4000 residents being left homeless as their shacks were burned to the ground. In March 2020 the Khayelitsha tavern shooting took place in the area resulting in 7 deaths and 7 injuries.

== Geography ==
Khayelitsha is located on the Cape Flats, between Table Bay and False Bay.

=== Subdivisions ===
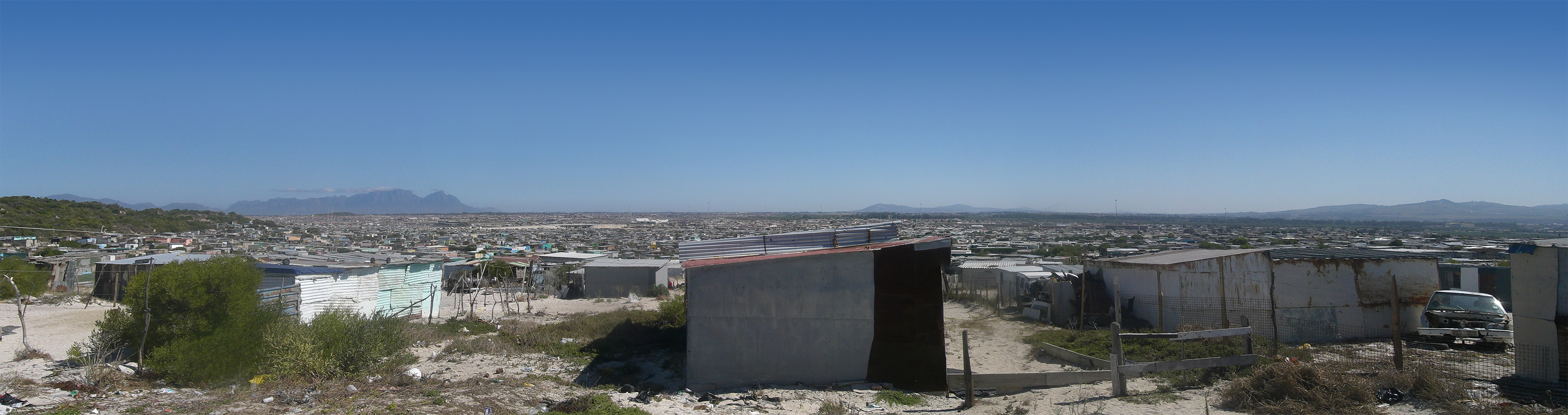
Khayelitsha panorama looking towards Table Mountain

Khayelitsha has been split into about 22 areas, depending on how one divides them. It is made up of Makhaza, Kuyasa, Harare, Makhaya, Town Two, Ilitha Park, Site B (consisting of the newer K-Z sections) and Site C. Khayelitsha is made up of old formal areas and new informal/formal areas. The old formal areas were built originally by the apartheid government and are known as A-J sections also called 'Khayelitsha' proper (each section with more or less than 500 formal two roomed brick houses) Bongweni, Ikhwezi Park, Khulani Park, Khanya Park, Tembani, Washington Square, Graceland, Ekuphumleni and Zolani Park. These areas are mostly made up of bank bond housing and are home to middle-class / upper working class populations.

The newer areas have been built up around the older areas. They include Site B (which is further subdivided into the K-Z sections in continuation of the original A-J sections respectively and TR, QQ, RR and BM informal settlements), Site C (which is further subdivided into the A-D sections and Chris Hani), Green Point, Litha Park, Mandela Park, Makhaza, Makhaya and Harare. With the exception of Litha Park, these areas contain a high number of informal settlements, RDP houses, and informal backyard dwellers.

Notable informal settlements in Khayelitsha include QQ Section, TR Section, RR Section and Enkanini which have gained prominence due to their high-profile conflicts with government including protest actions such as road blockages.

== Economy ==
Khayelitsha has a small but growing middle class with a total of 1,400 households earning more than R25,000 a month in 2011. That is a large increase since 2001, when almost no households earned over R25,000 a month.

The growing number of entrepreneurs in the township are ably supported by organisations such as the Patrice Motsepe Foundation and Caban Investments (through their Qinisanani initiative) and HubSpace.

As Cape Town's largest township, Khayelitsha attracts funding from international aid agencies. A number of partnerships with international companies, governments and NGOs have been set up:

- A successful initiative at Ikhwezi Lesizwe Primary School has brought company support for technology. The UK based Ramesys have donated software and kit to allow for good web communications. Smart Technology from Canada have donated an interactive whiteboard.
- Another such group based in Zion, Illinois, US, is Partners Across the Ocean, which has brought Khayelitsha high school learners to the US and built a computer lab in Khayelitsha.
- The South Africa Community Fund has been active in the neighbourhood of Harare, Khayelitsha, bringing groups of students from Arizona State University and other volunteers for home stays and community immersions.
- VPUU began as a partnership between the City of Cape Town, the German Development Bank (KfW) and the community of Khayelitsha in September 2005. The partnership has since been extended to include the Western Cape Government, National Treasury, international agencies, NGOs, CBOs and other communities. Co-funded by the Federal German Ministry for Economic Cooperation and Development, the City of Cape Town, National Treasury, other public and third party funding and implemented by AHT Group AG and Sustainable Urban Neighbourhood (SUN) Development Pty Ltd. In April 2013, VPUU NPC was established to implement VPUU in the Western Cape.VPUU (Violence Prevention through Urban Upgrading) is responsible for the building of community centres and gardens, and the sponsorship of soccer clubs.
- Khayelitsha was also the focus of the Community Exchange System when it launched in Cape Town.
- Canadian organisation Golden Future South Africa volunteers in secondary schools in Site B. Within the schools, this organisation facilitates conversation on the topics of health, life orientation and education. Outside the schools, a business group aids local businesses in legitimising their establishments.
- Grassroot Soccer is a South African non-profit organisation that integrates the cross-cultural appeal of soccer with evidence based HIV prevention and life skills programmes that provide youth in Khayelitsha, as well as other parts of Africa, with the knowledge, skills and support to live HIV free. This organisation operates in Khayelitsha from the Football For Hope Centre, a community centre in Khayelitsha.
- Sikhula Sonke Early Childhood Development has been active in Khayelitsha since 2001, a community-based organisation addressing the need for early childhood development by providing access to quality ECD services, training and resources to parents, caregivers and preschool teachers in the informal settlements. Their programmes include coaching and support for ECD practitioners/teachers, playgroup outreach programmes using public spaces to educate children whose parents cannot afford preschool, family support and psychosocial services as well as toy library services. By providing access to early childhood education, family support and safe spaces, Sikhula Sonke actively works to build stronger communities and prepare young children for the future.
- AMANDLA EduFootball, a South Africa-based non-profit organisation, established its inaugural Safe-Hub, the Chris Campbell Memorial Field, in partnership with the CTC Ten Foundation in Khayelitsha. The Safe-Hub is a youth friendly space where young people can find physical and emotional safety through support from strong role models and positive young community leaders. The organisation's evidence-based youth violence prevention model identifies hot-spots of chronic youth driven violence and establishes 'Safe-Hub' infrastructures at the centre of these crisis points. In 2012, this project won the international Beyond Sport Award for the worldwide best project in the category 'Sport for Conflict Resolution'.
- Since 2003 the Niall Mellon Township Trust has managed £160m of fundraising which has been used to build 25,000 homes, affecting 125,000 people. In November 2016, under the Mellon Educate Results Programme, 270 volunteers built 13 new classrooms, 2 toilet blocks, 1 kitchen and renovated 7 other buildings in Khayelitsha. The aim of the programme is to help raise and sustain school grades from below 20% to above 75%.

== Education ==
List of primary schools
- Chumisa Primary School
- Eluxolweni Primary School
- Emithini Primary School
- Encotsheni Primary School
- Homba Primary School
- Hopolang Combined School
- Ikhusi Primary School
- Impendulo Public Primary School
- Injongo Primary School
- Intshayelelo Primary School
- Isikhokelo Public Primary School
- Isiphiwo Primary School
- Kukhanyile Primary School
- Kuyasa Primary School
- Luleka Primary School
- Lwandle Primary School
- Masiphumelele Primary School
- Masithandane Primary School
- Mzamomhle Primary School
- Nkazimlo Primary School
- Nolungile Primary School
- Nomsa Mapongwana Primary School
- Ntwasahlobo Primary School
- Sivile Primary School
- Sivuyiseni Public Primary School
- Skaumlandela Primary School
- Sobambisana Primary School
- Sosebenza Primary School
- Soyisile Primary School
- Ummangaliso Primary School
- Umthawelanga Primary School
- Vuselela Primary School
- Vusumoya Primary School
- Vuzamanzi Public Primary School
- Yomelela Primary School
- Zenzeleni School for Creative Education
List of secondary schools
- Bulumko Secondary School
- Centre of Science and Technology
- Chris Hani Secondary School
- Esangweni Secondary School
- Harry Gwala Secondary School
- Hopolang Combined School
- Intlanganiso Secondary School
- Intlangiso Secondary School
- Iqhayiya secondary school
- Joe Slovo Secondary School
- Khayelitsha Secondary School
- Kwamfundo Secondary School
- Luhlaza Secondary School
- Manyano High School
- Masiyile Senior Secondary School
- Masiyilie Junior Secondary School
- Matthew Goniwe Memorial High School
- Mpumelelo Magatya Senior Secondary School
- Siphamandla Secondary School
- Sizimisele Secondary School
- Thembelihle High School
- Uxolo High School
- Usasazo Secondary School
- Zola Business Secondary School

== Infrastructure ==
=== Transport ===
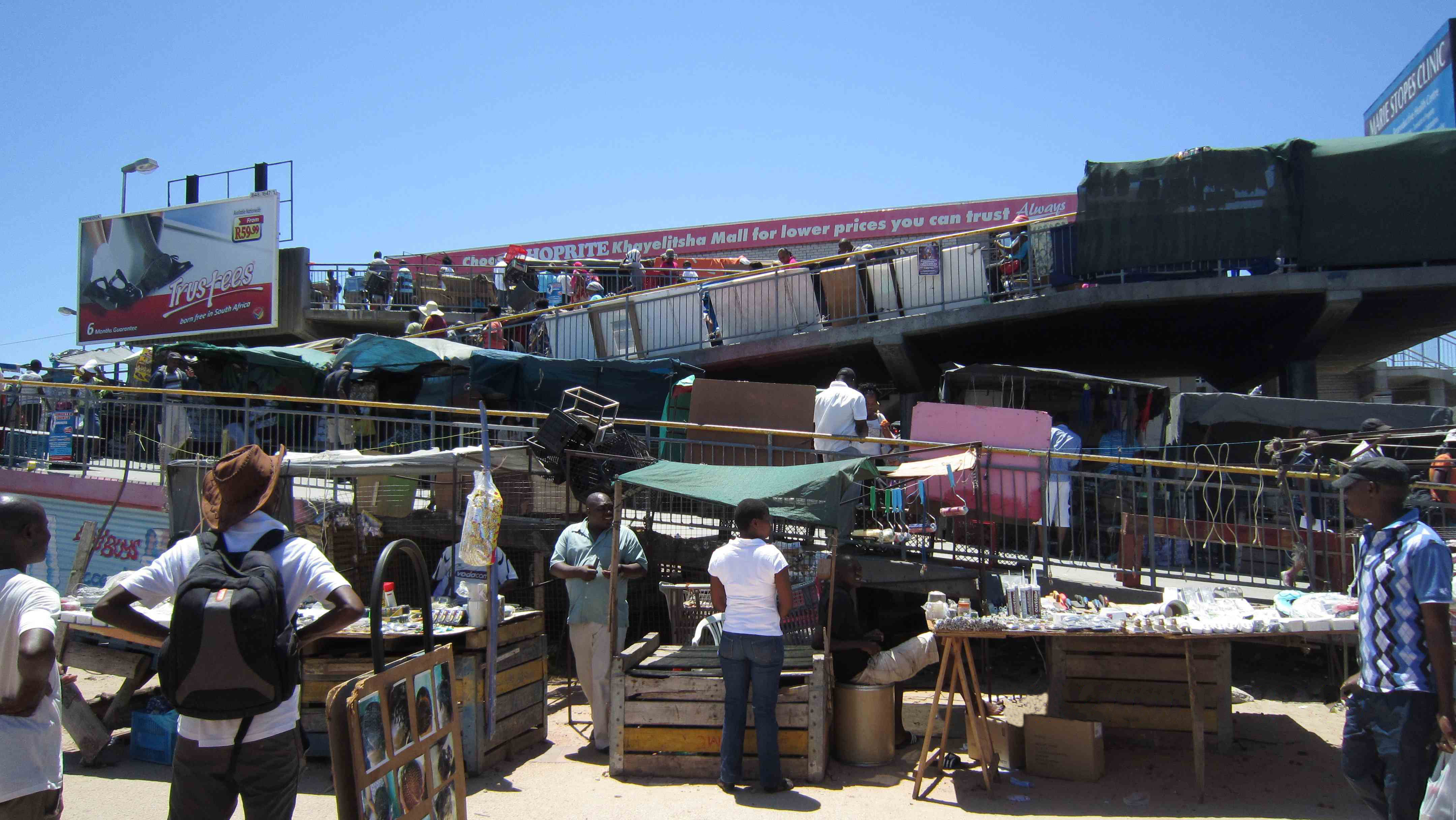
The outside of the Khayelitsha Metrorail Station (2012)

Khayelitsha has a good transport infrastructure. Golden Arrow Bus Services, MyCiti Bus IRT system, Metrorail trains, and many taxis all have routes to and from the township. Trains are the cheapest and most used form of transport. Khayelitsha has six rail stations: Mandalay, Nolungile, Nonkqubela, Khayelitsha, Kuyasa and Chris Hani. Trains in Khayelitsha have not operated since June 2019 due to cable theft that is currently occurring on the Central Line all the way to Langa Station. This has affected a lot of people as trains are the cheapest form of public transportation. There are also a number of bus stations and taxi ranks, although most taxis still pick up passengers on the main roads. Khayelitsha's busiest roads are Mew Way, Spine Road, Lansdowne Road, Walter Sisulu Road, Bonga Drive and Baden Powell Drive.

=== Health care ===
==== Khayelitsha Hospital ====
Khayelitsha District Hospital was opened in February 2012. The hospital is a public health facility with a status of a District Hospital. This hospital operates in the Khayelitsha Health District of the Metro Region and is under the mandate of the Western Cape Department of Health. The 300-bed medical facility provides support to the surrounding primary healthcare facilities to ensure that patients receive care at the lowest level of entry into the healthcare system. The facility came as a relief to the ever growing populous Khayelitsha township. It offers district level care including a large 24-hour emergency centre, medical wards, surgical wards, obstetric wards, gynaecology wards, paediatric wards and nursery.

==== Khayelitsha Community Health Clinic (CHC) ====
There are three provincial government clinics in Khayelitsha. Khayelitsha (Site B) CHC (Community Health Clinic), Michael Maphongwana (Harare) CHC and Nolungile (Site C) CHC and Kuyasa Children's Clinic which was built in 2012 are the other provincial government clinics.

==== Khayelitsha clinics ====
There are also numerous small municipal clinics throughout the township. These clinics play an important role as centres of primary healthcare by providing a variety of healthcare services to children, women and, youth and men's health. Services offered at these include child health, family planning, TB treatment, HIV testing, Pap smears and treatment and diagnosis of sexually transmitted infections. These health facilities are managed and operated by the local government authority of the City of Cape Town.

- Kuyasa Community Day Centre
- Kuyasa Men's Clinic
- Luvuyo Community Day Centre
- Matthew Goniwe Community Health Centre
- Mayenzeke Clinic
- Nolungile Clinic
- Nolungile Youth Centre
- Site B Men's Clinic
- Site B Youth Centre
- Site C Men's Clinic

== Society and culture ==
External image
- Image gallery of the FIFA Football for Hope centre construction in Khayelitsha

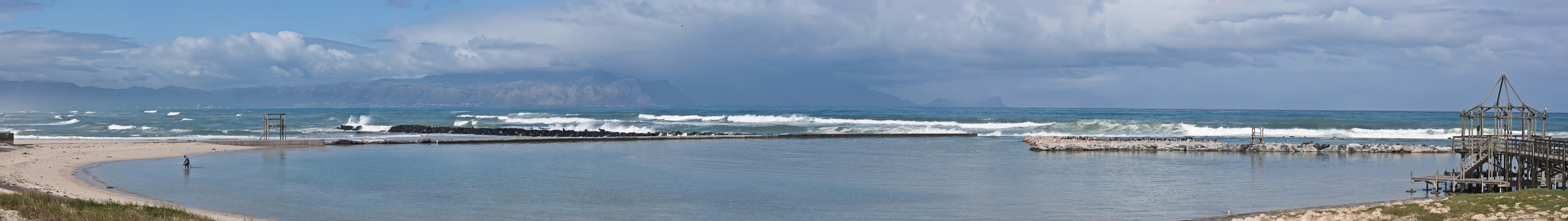
Monwabisi beach, showing the wall constructed to create a cove

=== Beaches and recreation ===
Khayelitsha has one beach, Monwabisi, located on the coast of False Bay. It is known to be one of the most dangerous beaches in the area. It was recorded that one day, five people drowned at the beach. This is due to a wall that was built to create a calm cove. Instead it has made many dangerous currents. In the past 15 years over 50 people have drowned at the beach. On warm public holidays, Christmas Eve and New Year's Day the beach becomes highly occupied.

Khayelitsha also has a swimming pool that was built for the community as whole. It is near the Khayelitsha court.

=== Social movements ===
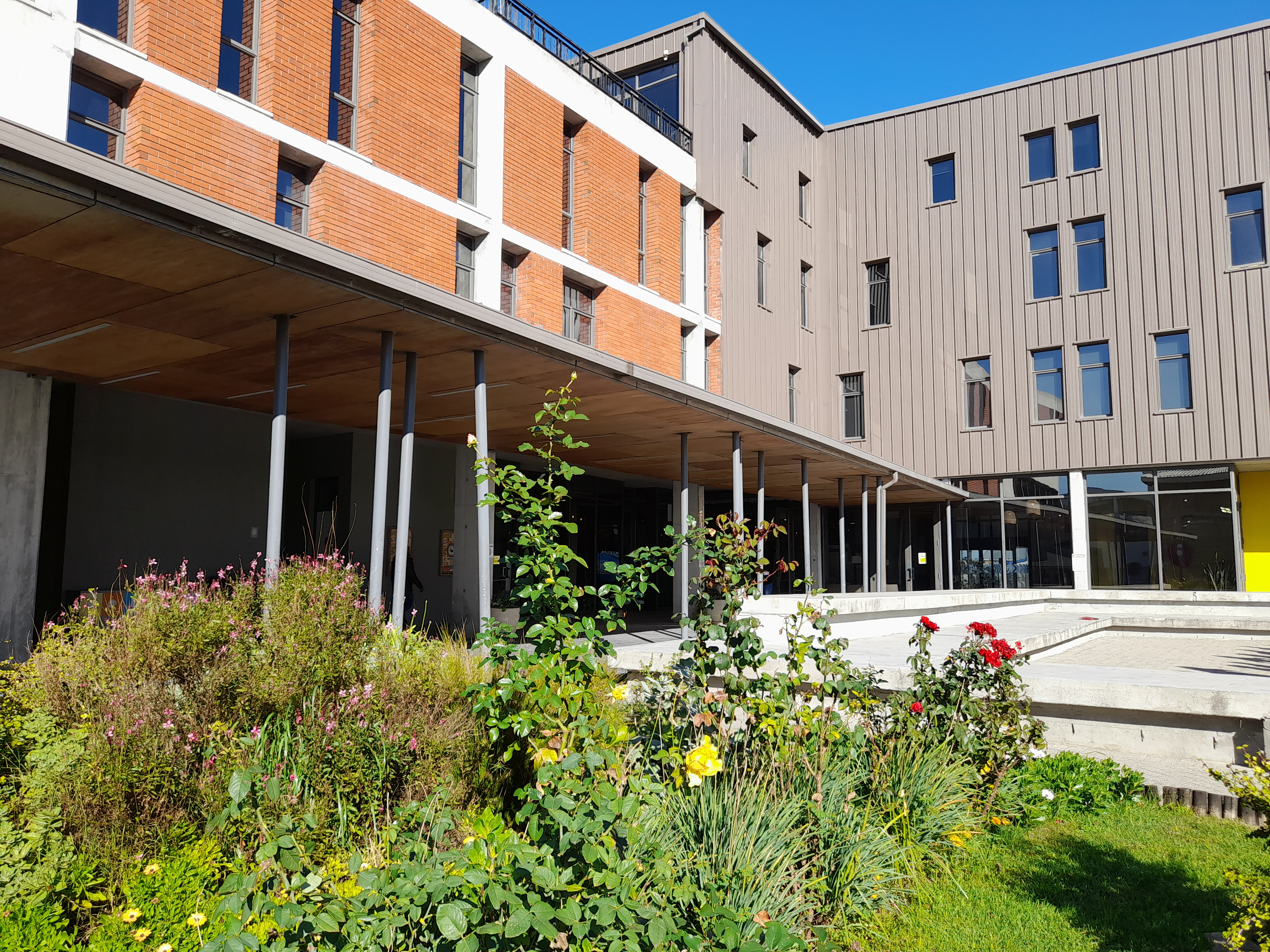
Isivivana Centre, Khayelitsha.

Abahlali baseMjondolo, Mandela Park Backyarders the Treatment Action Campaign, the Social Justice Coalition, and the Western Cape Anti-Eviction Campaign all have a strong presence in Khayelitsha. Seskhona Peoples' Rights Movement which was formed to continue with the struggle for sanitation in the most disadvantaged areas in Cape Town. African National Congress Youth League, led by Sibusiso Zonke and Buyel' embo village, in Mandela Park, is an entertainment place where events are held. The Isivivana Centre, a community centre and activist hub, is home to community-led organisations such as Equal Education, the Equal Education Law Centre, TEKANO, the Social Justice Coalition, Medecins Sans Frontieres, Workers' World Media Productions and the Treatment Action Campaign. The centre also hosts a library and the only community cinema of its kind, the Bertha Movie House which runs regular screening programmes – all free for the township communities.

Another social movement that exists in the Cape Flats, but in particular Khayelitsha, is a socialist movement called Ses'khona Peoples Rights Movement founded by Andile Lili that was established in 2013 to fight for the rights of the people in the marginalized areas. This included the interests of people in the informal settlements of Cape Town including the backyard dwellers.

=== Sport ===
As part of the 2010 FIFA World Cup preparations, a Football for Hope centre was constructed in Khayelitsha. An Australian rules football development program conducted by the AFL South Africa also operates in the township. Bayanda Sobetwa became the first South African to be signed to an AFL club, when the Greater Western Sydney Giants offered him a SportsReady traineeship in 2010.

=== Tourism ===
Recently a tourist centre opened in the township on Look Out Point, or Lookout Hill, one of the highest hills in the area on the corner of Mew Way & Spine Road. Lookout Hill is also one of the 7 Wonders of the world picture frame of Cape Town, part of the World Design Capital projects. Numerous organisations offer "township tours", who support Khayelitsha through social tourism. There are also opportunities for social tourism as volunteers in numerous projects around Khayelitsha.

=== Community media ===
Two community newspapers circulate in Khayelitsha, Vukani and City Vision. Radio Zibonele 98.2 is a community radio station situated in the Ilitha Park part of the township.

== In popular culture ==
=== Films set in Khayelitsha ===
- U-Carmen eKhayelitsha, a 2005 Xhosa film adaptation of Bizet's Carmen
- The Wooden Camera
- My Mother Built This House, a Bullfrog Film production, part of the City Life series
- Urbanized, a documentary on the effect and affect of urban design theory over the last couple millennia.

== Notable people ==
- Khayalethu Anthony, actor, writer and director
- Richard Dyantyi, political leader
- Lungile Gongqa, long-distance runner
- Qaqamba Gubanca, social worker and activist
- Andile Lili, political leader
- Mark Mayambela, professional football player
- Abigail Mbalo-Mokoena, chef and restaurateur
- Veronica Mente, politician and former chairperson of the Economic Freedom Fighters
- Yola Mgogwana, climate activist
- Ayanda Patosi, professional football player
- Funeka Soldaat, activist
- Leo Thethani, professional football player
- Nontsikelelo Veleko, photographer
- Tapelo Xoki, professional football player

== See also ==
- District Six
- Mitchells Plain
