= Sustainable urban neighbourhood =

The sustainable urban neighbourhood (SUN) is an urban design model which is part of 21st-century urban reform theory, moving away from the typical suburban development of the UK and US towards more continental city styles. It emerged in the UK in the 1990s, specifically from pioneering work by URBED (The Urban and Economic Development Group), an urban regeneration consultancy and research centre in Manchester.

This page looks at SUN theory, addresses the background to the emergence of the SUN, its defining characteristics, looks at a real life example, and finally outlines some criticisms of the concept.

== About the SUN ==
A SUN is a small-scale, urban area within a city that comprises social, economic and environmental sustainability. The term "SUN" is significant; sustainable relating to its longevity and reduced environmental impact, urban relating to its location and physical character, and neighbourhood constituting the social and economic wellbeing of the area.

The SUN concept is significant to UK urban design, as it is based on the actual experiences of living and working within a city and is located within existing towns and cities. It recognises that cities are inseparable from the historical processes that formed them and works with the complexity and disorder of existing urban areas, rather than proposing a radical new vision. Advocates claim it is the answer to anti-urban post-war planning principles that have fed urban decline.

The SUN concept is one of many urban theory models in the ongoing process of understanding what sustainable urban form actually is.

SUN theory is broadly influenced by:

- the smart growth movement of the US – a concept specifically opposed to urban sprawl, it advocates high density, mixed-use development, sustainable resource use, and open space conservation. It aims to foster a sense of community, a sense of place, and promotes denser residential development, housing being a significant part of the built environment.
- the compact city arising from the European Commission's Green Paper on Urban Environment – opposes the ‘dispersed city’, aiming to combat car dependency, CO_{2} emissions, energy consumption levels, and overall accessibility issues, it reuses existing infrastructure, promotes green space, and rejuvenates existing urban areas to produce a higher quality of life and dynamic sites of economic interaction.

It is more specifically influenced by:

- the new urbanism movement (early 1980s US) – central concept is the importance of local place within the globalising world. It also refers to a coalition of innovative architects, developers and builders reacting to suburban sprawl and failed urban development by providing urban communities with culturally-diverse housing, easy access to work, play and schools, efficient transportation, and generally creating liveable urban areas.
- the urban villages movement (late 1980s UK) – originally relating to a dense node of development embedded in a wider pattern of dispersal, it has come to entail the repopulation and reintensification of existing cities by increasing densities.

The SUN is specifically linked to David Rudlin of URBED, involved in the redevelopment of the Hulme estate in Manchester. Similar ideas were subsequently applied throughout the local area and other parts of the city, facilitated by political intent to redevelop Manchester in the image of the European cities that had been visited as part of the city's 1996 Olympic bid.

== Background ==
=== Flight from the city ===
The Industrial Revolution had a devastating effect on the British city, with phenomenal population growth in industrial cities like Manchester, stretching their capacity beyond breaking point. They were overcrowded, had limited sanitation, and were characterised by pollution, crime and congestion, becoming a dystopian symbol. As a result, there was a mass exodus from cities throughout the 19th century.

The 20th century British city was no longer home to a cross-section of society and urban populations became characterised by those unable to escape, whilst the leafy, low density suburb became the residential aspiration. The growth of the private car fed the expansion of the Anglo-American city into sprawling suburbia. As mobility increased, not only people but commercial activity fled to leave a deserted inner city surrounded by sprawling industrial estates, business parks, and suburban residential areas, termed ‘edge cities’.

=== Continental cities ===
In sharp contrast to the Anglo-American city is the continental model. The typical example is Paris, with its grand boulevards, as designed by Georges-Eugène Haussmann in the 1860s. They carved up the city and were lined with large, six storey buildings, providing high density, mixed-use structures, with copious amounts of spacious, middle-class housing. This continental trend meant the cities and towns kept their form, density and vitality over the 19th and 20th centuries as people aspired to an urban apartment, rather than leaving the city for suburban villas. As a result, continental cities continue to be thriving hubs where people simultaneously live, work and play.

=== Lost urban visions ===
The great theorists of the 20th century city were Utopian academics and their ideas have had a lasting effect on modern town planning. Below are the ideas of what Fishman calls the three most important visionaries of the last century:

- Ebenezer Howard and his Garden City – a decentralised approach where the final development of the city is left to the citizens themselves. A high density agglomeration of numerous garden cities of voluntary, self-governing communities expands across the rural landscape. It is linked with municipal railways and canals, thereby offering the economic and social opportunities of the giant city, with the benefits of being in the country. Termed the Social City, it was the realisation of Howard's third magnet: town-country (see File:Howard-three-magnets.png). However, Howard's vision has often been misinterpreted as a singular garden city, and confused as a garden suburb. Howard was not a planner yet his vision inspired a city planning movement which informed the post-war New Towns policy of the UK.
- Frank Lloyd Wright and his Broadacre City – containing a similar rejection of the big city and radical application of decentralisation to Howard's, this vision comprehensively weaves together American anti-urban thinking, with a belief in technology's liberating effect and the free individual. Broadacres merges but keeps town and country separate: a man-made environment of individual homes spreads out across the countryside, each one a separate inward-looking unit of domestic and economic life. Interspersed are all the institutions of advanced society, but with no central point for power to congregate around. Instead, his vision of a radically dispersed city is made possible by the automobile in the Machine Age. Although Broadacre City has not enjoyed popular success or implementation, it influenced the rise of the sprawling American suburb.
- Le Corbusier and his Ville Radieuse – initially the 'contemporary city', becoming the 'radiant city', Le Corbusier created a direct celebration of city as the site of centralised power, in contrast to the two former theorists. Seeing chaos and inefficiency in 20th-century cities, he sought order and calm, entailed in his vision of skyscrapers set out in parks, forming a beautiful yet efficient business district. At its centre is a complicated central interchange of all transportation systems, with the rest of the city classified by function into sectors. A decidedly ordered city, it is built upwards in magnificent skyscrapers so it is compact but not congested, with much green space. It is a city built around administration and power-from-above where the planner can create social harmony through urban design. Brasília, capital of Brazil, is an example of a quasi-Corbusian city planned and built in 1956.

The 20th century utopian visions responded to the technological opportunity of the modern age. At the beginning of the 21st century, urban visions are required that address the unsuitable patterns of development that technology has produced.

=== Urban renaissance ===
As the British city degenerated through the 20th century, the principles of suburban development became institutionalised in professional, academic and public spheres, posing a powerful inhibiting force to urban reform. Yet since the late 1980s the UK has seen a gradual renaissance of its urban areas, and in particular, since the Government's Urban Task Force report.

The heavy industry and overcrowding that caused the initial flight from the city are gone, whilst their role as transport hubs and the sites of activity, creativity and face-to-face interaction feeds the newly-dominant financial, knowledge and cultural sectors. The boom in consumer-led service employment for people with a wide range of skills led to the rise of the yuppie and a process of gentrification, where young professionals move back to inner city areas. However, many argue that gentrification focuses on a specific new urban middle-class, marginalising and excluding the urban poor and lacking in any environmental sustainability concerns.

Rudlin and Falk argue that in the 21st century, it is not enough to remake the city as counterfeit suburbs or to cling to outdated 20th century urban visions. New urban models are needed that promote humane and environmentally-aligned urban areas. As the European Green Paper for Urban Environment detailed, ‘the multifunctional, creative city, which is also the liveable city, is the one that pollutes least’. The SUN is one such model, and its key characteristics are outlined below.

== Defining elements ==
These points set out the characteristics of urban, as opposed to suburban, design. Environmental pressures and social and demographic changes have reawakened the importance of city living in the 21st century. Rudlin and Falk argue that if the UK urban renaissance is to be successful then the techniques of city building must be recognised, allowing an urban district to become a neighbourhood.

=== Location ===
The SUN is located within existing cities, and is an urban vision that works with the complexity and disorder of existing urban areas.

=== High density ===
A compact built environment increases the sustainability of the urban form. For example, influential research suggests that the higher the density of an area, the lower the energy uses for transport purposes. The key to increasing the amount of walking, cycling and public transport use is compactness: if housing is built near to existing facilities then travel time is reduced, and sustainable methods of transport are encouraged. Various options include the development of brown field sites and car parks, redevelopment of council estates, conversion of empty commercial space, intensification of existing housing areas, better use of empty homes, and subdivision of larger houses.

=== Rich mix of uses ===
The accommodation of different uses in proximity to each other encourages people to walk and cycle to school, work, and the shops. Whilst, horizontal mixed-use is more common, small-scale development that mixes uses vertically within the building, with an active commercial ground floor and residential flats and apartments above, creates the high streets and secondary streets that form the heart of a neighbourhood. However, this housing is not traditionally desired in the UK and the planning system has sought to avoid conflicts by separating uses. On option is schemes like ‘living over the shop’ (LOTS). An example of mixed-use development is the Urban Splash Moho development in Castlefield, Manchester, which integrates innovative apartments with shops, bars, restaurants and offices on the ground floor.

=== Permeability ===
This refers to the ease with which people, not cars, can move through an urban area by a choice of routes. It relies on a framework of streets, where each street leads to another street which leads to another, and avoiding long stretches with no junctions. This means all parts of the neighbourhood are accessible, with an emphasis on nodes of activity like shopping centres, adding to its pedestrian-friendliness and urban character. However, the urban street has a dual role as a route and a high street, and through-traffic is important to the commercial vitality of an area. Designing streets that accommodate traffic without affecting pedestrian life is crucial to maintaining permeability for both. SUNs are vibrant places, entailing a rediscovery of the Roman maxim via vita est (streets are life).

=== Urban blocks ===
A strong framework of streets is not just about movement. It is a key organising element giving structure and form to an area. In the UK this tends to be an unplanned grid that grows out over time like a spider's web. The SUN entails a hierarchy of streets which define urban blocks for development. Buildings front onto the public realm of the street with private domains separated to the rear. This is different from suburban development where cul-de-sacs often leave houses backing onto the street. The urban grain of a neighbourhood is important to a vibrant public realm. Small-scale development by lots of different developers creates variety in the buildings which create the backdrop to urban life. This is missing or artificially produced if a developer is given a large block to develop, failing to capture the traditional nature of urban areas. A fine urban grain creates a sense of place, not space, generating vibrancy and unity in the neighbourhood.

=== Good transit ===
An efficient public transport system is vital and the SUN should be organised to this end, so that bus/tram stops are safe and accessible to the largest possible number of people, thus giving a real public transport alternative to the car.

=== Walkability ===
Reducing car use is a profound influence on future development forms. As discussed, the internal permeability of the SUN is key to creating a pedestrian-friendly area where walking or cycling is the most convenient mode of transport for all trips. Also significant is legibility, which refers to how easy it is to read an urban area and understand its structure. Landmarks, variation in buildings and traditional street layouts of grids or where main routes lead to the centre, all improve the legibility of a neighbourhood.

=== Environmental sustainability ===
The priorities for urban development now require environmental sustainability to be integrated into spatial planning, as well as economic and social concerns. This cannot be achieved by focusing either on the technological design of individual buildings or on broad (inter)national policy. The challenge is to raise standards and change behaviour at a local (neighbourhood) scale – wide enough to address broad environmental issues but small enough to effect practical change in people's lives. The aim is to reduce the linearity of resource systems, by closing some of the loops to create sustainable, circular systems at the local level.

- Energy: urban housing tends to be more energy efficient due to its high density nature and location within existing facilities and infrastructure. Urban buildings are also flexible to reuse and recycling for different functions, like the redevelopment of an old warehouse for example. SUNs are also well-suited to Combined Heat and Power (CHP) technologies, which have a major impact on energy use efficiency and lower the environmental effects of electricity generation.
- Water: there are many local level mechanisms that can help close resource systems. For example, recycling water from baths and sinks for toilet flushing is known as greywater restoration, which can benefit from economies of scale when serving a whole neighbourhood.
- Recycling: urban densities are an advantage as they produce a sufficient volume of collected waste to support economically viable urban recycling systems where waste is segregated by collection operatives, not in the home. Related to this is the potential for neighbourhood-scale recycling activities, for example, the informal exchange of goods like furniture (see Jacobs’ ‘urban mines’ concept.

Another environmental priority is the incorporation of green spaces in the SUN. It is about quality not quantity, as open space takes away from the vibrant, high-density nature of the neighbourhood. Therefore, opportunities to maximise wildlife and diversity are more important than having large, uniform areas of grass, like street trees, parks, squares, balconies, window boxes, courtyards, private gardens and roof gardens.

=== Community ===
Whilst environmental sustainability is a priority, it should not be at the expense of social concerns. The SUN is a civilised place for people to live and communities to prosper. Specifically it is about creating popular neighbourhoods that are a joy to live, work and play in, and which continue to attract people and investment over the years. Rudlin and Falk also advocate attracting the middle-classes and upper working classes back to the city, so as to remove the stigma of living in inner city areas, generating a diverse community rather than deteriorating ghettos of the socially deprived. By integrating a mix of tenures and uses in a neighbourhood with a balance between gentrification and decline, a sense of belonging and pride in an area is created. This tends to go hand-in-hand with incremental, small-scale development that allows urban areas to grow and change organically over time.

== Hulme and Homes for Change ==
The Hulme Homes for Change redevelopment is one of the most important projects in the UK, providing a real life model of the SUN. URBED worked to regenerate Hulme, a 1960s deck-access housing estate and thirteen tower blocks that was suffering physical and social decline. Once a vibrant working class area, the reputation of the area had fallen significantly, with poverty, crime, drug use and unemployment on the rise. However, the proximity of the area to the university and easy availability of flats meant it attracted more and more young people to become a focus for Manchester's subculture. Single squatters took over family flats, turning the bedrooms into offices, workshops and recording studios. The area had one of the highest levels of higher education qualifications in the city by the late 1980s, yet also a large number of unqualified and unemployed. This diverse community fought hard to prevent the redevelopment of the area in the 1980s.

Nevertheless, it was mostly demolished. In its place the Homes for Change development includes 75 apartments, 1500m2 of workspaces, theatre, gallery, café, shop, and workshop. The area for redevelopment was huge, effectively the creation of a SUN from scratch and the integration to form a mixed-use urban area lacked the small-scale, incremental development that produces variety in the urban grain, leading to a somewhat artificial result.

Regardless, Hulme has been transformed under Homes for Change but the project has faced criticism and protest, with members of the community feeling increasingly marginalised from the commercial focus of the redevelopment.

== Criticism ==
Critics argue that SUN theory entails lofty ideas that sometimes verge on the messianic, given the fact that no built project has been an unequivocal success. In addition, the central idea of traditional urban forms and the commitment to a village community means that questions arise over the suitability of this to contemporary social life. The village is not the only model for more sustainable living and the SUN inherently entails radical social reform in reviving the traditional community, in order to achieve reductions on pollution and energy consumption. Many argue this is an unrealistic and unachievable social aspiration for contemporary society.

Another significant criticism involves accusations of social exclusion. This refers to a lack of material needs being fulfilled, like lack of housing, as well as social, political and existential resources being inaccessible. Brindley explains that the postmodern conception of community revolves around image and identity through lifestyle choices. Individuals that lack consumption choices therefore also lack a choice of identity and are marginalised to stigmatised housing estates.

== See also ==
=== Topics ===
- Sustainability
- Smart growth
- Compact city
- New urbanism
- Microgrid
- Urban village
- Low traffic neighbourhood
- Garden city movement
- Broadacre city
- Ville Radieuse
- Gentrification
- Placemaking
- Hulme

=== Locations ===
- Coin Street Community Builders, London's South Bank
- Bo 100, Malmö, Sweden
