= Children of South Africa =

Children Of South Africa (CHOSA) is a nonprofit charity that locates and supports community-based organizations (CBOs) in South Africa that reach out and take care of orphans and other vulnerable children in South Africa. It is a registered 501(c)(3) nonprofit organization in the United States of America.

== Partners ==
As of 2013, the charity has supported a number of organizations including Baphumelele Children's Home in Khayelitsha, Cape Town, Emasithandane Children's Project in Nyanga, Cape Town, Ubuhle Babantwana in Mfuleni, Cape Town, QQ Section Children's Committee in Khayelitsha, Cape Town, Mandela Park Children's Committee in Khayelitsha, Cape Town, and Abaphumeleli Place of Safety in Khayelitsha, Cape Town.

On 30 March 2012, a CHOSA partner, the QQ Section Community Creche, burned down for the second time. Community members came together and, with the help of CHOSA, donated money out of their own pockets to rebuild it.

== Other programs ==
CHOSA has also started a house-building program for vulnerable families called the Philani Family Fund which works in conjunction with Philani Nutrition Centres, helped start the Desiree Ellis Soccer League which is now known as Amandla Edufootball, has provided seed funding to the Philippi Township Baseball Academy and runs a volunteer and mentoring program for the children of many of these projects.

CHOSA is a member of the Coalition for a Sustainable Africa, a consortium of organizations advancing locally led holistic solutions in Africa. It has been supporter by a number of organisations including Kids First. Its outreach initiative which teaches critical thinking through photography has been featured on National Public Radio (NPR).

== See also ==
- Ichikowitz Family Foundation
