= Football for Hope Movement =

Football for Hope Movement came about after collaborative work between streetfootballworld and the Fédération Internationale de Football Association (FIFA). The movement was established to further conversation and development of relationships between existing social development and football organizations, various football club teams and individual players, as well as other commercial partners. By using the sport of football as its main vehicle, Football for Hope works to ultimately further develop and achieve the UN Millennium Development Goals.

== Background ==
The Football for Hope Movement aims to establish sustainable programmes that work towards greater social development through community interest, passion, and understanding of the sport of football. Through the use of football, the movement aims to contribute towards further sharing of knowledge and understanding of public health, peace building, discrimination and integration, youth education, and the environment. Each programme will contribute specifically and individually towards these various components.

In addition to the various programme created through the Football for Hope Movement, the largest contribution made by the movement is the creation and building of Football for Hope Centres across the continent of Africa. This is made possible with the partnership between the Football for Hope movement, streetfootballworld, FIFA, as well as various other members.

Each Football for Hope Centre or Hope Centre will incorporate a shared community space and football field. Each common space will target its community programming towards children and young people of the surrounding areas. By incorporating the use of football, each centre aims to promote greater interest and involvement of children and young people. In addition, the movement aims to encourage the youth to be involved in the design and building of the centres, creating a great sense of ownership within the communities and each centre.

The centres will be focused around three main components: education, public health, and football. Football-centred events are used as a greater incentive towards encouraging children and young people to be actively involved. Through these events, each centre aims to establish stronger and more influential learning environments. Each centre hopes to be supplied with computers and materials necessary to creating such an environment. In addition, as poor public health is a main concern for much of Africa, the centres aim to address these concerns through a wide range of health services, including public health education courses. The last component of each centre is focused around football in order to attract all age groups through offering a space where individuals can share and engage in various programs, activities, and games.

By addressing local social challenges experienced by many young people in developing and disadvantaged communities, The Football for Hope Movement hopes to work towards greater and positive social change. In working with younger generations, the Football for Hope Movement aims to make an impact early in the lives of many, creating greater change for future generations.

== 20 Centres for 2010 Campaign ==
To promote the establishment of the Football for Hope Movement, FIFA launched the 20 Centres for 2010 campaign to create further awareness. This became the official campaign of the 2010 FIFA World Cup games.

== Development ==
Since its inception in 2005, the Football for Hope Movement has spread all across the continent of Africa, having already opened several centres. The movement was broken into three project phases. In its first phase, Football for Hope launched its first centre in Khayelitsha, Cape Town, Western Cape, South Africa.

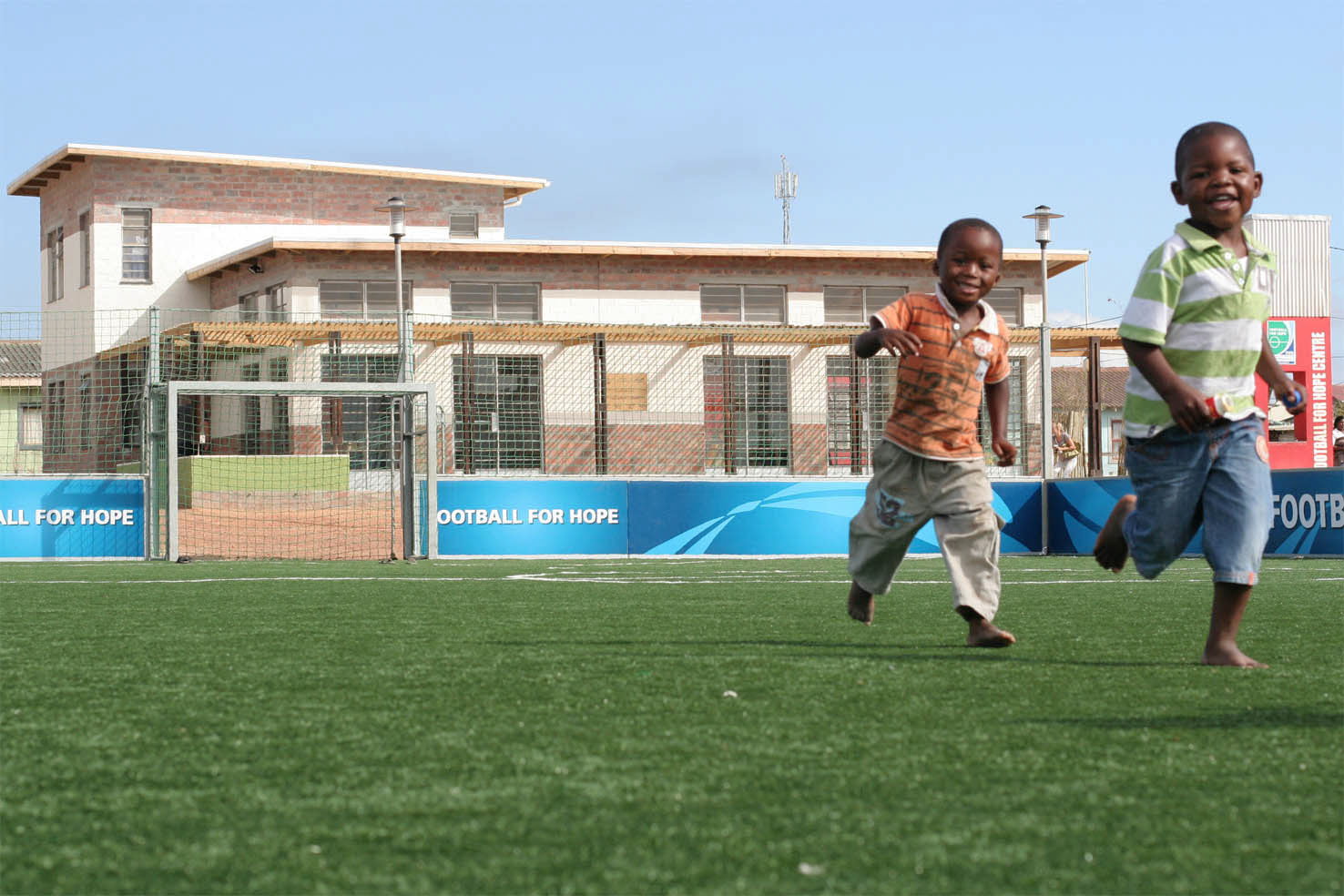
Children at play on the field at Football for Hope's first centre in Khayelitsha

=== Phase One Projects (September 2008 – September 2009) ===
Khayelitsha Football for Hope Centre located in Khayelitsha, Cape Town, Western Cape, South Africa

Baguineda Football for Hope Centre located in Baguineda, Bamako, Mali

Katutura Football for Hope Centre located in Katutura, Windhoek, Namibia

Mathare Football for Hope Centre located in Kangundo, Komarock, Kenya

=== Phase Two Projects (September 2009 – July 2011) ===
Lesotho Football for Hope Centre located in Maseru, LesothoKimisagara Football for Hope Centre located in Kimisagara, Kigali, Rwanda Oguaa Football for Hope Centre located in Oguaa, Cape Coast, Ghana

Qwaqwa Football for Hope Centre located in Qwaqwa, Free State, South Africa Edendale Football for Hope Centre located in Edendale, Pietermaritzburg, South Africa

Alexandra Football for Hope Centre located in Johannesburg, Gauteng, South Africa

=== Phase Three Projects (August 2011 – Ongoing) ===
Manica Football for Hope Centre located in Manica, Mozambique

Besongabang Football for Hope Centre located in Besongabang, Cameroon

Iringa Football for Hope Centre located in Iringa, Tanzania

South East Football for Hope Centre located in Ramotswa, Botswana

Magalakwena Football for Hope Centre located in Mokopane, Limpopo South Africa Tarrafal Football for Hope Centre located in Tarrafal, Santiago Island, Cape Verde

Bulawayo Football for Hope Centre located in Bulawayo, Zimbabwe

Kalebuka Football for Hope Centre located in Lubumbashi, Democratic Republic of Congo

Addis Ababa Football for Hope Centre located in Addis Ababa, Ethiopia

Kabondo Football for Hope Centre located in Bujumbura, Burundi

== Achievements ==
Since its inception in 2005, the Football for Hope Movement has supported various programs and initiatives around the world. It has and continues to host a number of official events at various FIFA tournaments, bringing together diverse young leaders from different parts of the world to share and exchange stories and experiences. The number of programmes Football for Hope has hosted and sponsored continues to increase since its inception.

=== Football for Hope has been the recipient of various awards including ===
Spirit of Sport Award 2011 Peace and Sport Award 2010

Global Sports Forum Trophy 2010

== Partnerships and Support ==
Architecture for Humanity Open Architecture Network FIFA streetfootballworld
