= Andile Lili =

South African politician

Member of the Western Cape Provincial Parliament
- In office 22 May 2019 – 28 May 2024

Personal details
- Party: African National Congress
- Occupation: Politician

Andile Lili is a South African who served as a Member of the Western Cape Provincial Parliament from May 2019 until May 2024, representing the African National Congress. He was the party's spokesperson on human settlements. He was previously a City of Cape Town councillor.

In 2013, Lili was dismissed as a councillor after he led protesters to throw human excrement on the steps of the provincial government building and at the Cape Town International Airport. He then formed the Ses'khona People's Rights Movement together with Loyiso Nkohla. He was elected to the ANC's provincial executive in 2015. Lili returned to council after the 2016 elections.
