= 20 Centres for 2010 =

20 Centres for 2010 is an official campaign by FIFA coinciding with the 2010 World Cup in South Africa. Twenty centres will be built in twenty cities across Africa. Education and public health will be the social services offered to youths, along with a soccer field children can use.
