= Climate change in the Gambia =

Emissions, impacts and responses of The Gambia related to climate change

Köppen climate classification map for the Gambia for 1980–2016

2071–2100 map under the worst climate change scenario. Mid-range scenarios are currently considered more likely

Climate change in the Gambia is having impacts on the natural environment and people of The Gambia. Like other countries in West Africa, the impacts of climate change are expected to be varied and complex. Climate change adaptation is going to be important to achieve the Sustainable Development Goals in the country.

== Greenhouse gas emissions ==
The Gambia's greenhouse Gas emissions are relatively low in relation to the global greenhouse emission scale. However, the country has country has taken actions with efforts to reduce them by developing the Gambia's Long-term Climate-Neutral Development Strategy 2025 in 2012. The country is said to be responsible for only 0.05% of the world's GHG emission. As of 2010, the biggest percentage of the country's GHG emission was from Land-use, land-use change and forestry (LULUCF) though before that up to around 1998, LULUCF acted as the country's carbon sink.

== Impacts on the natural environment ==
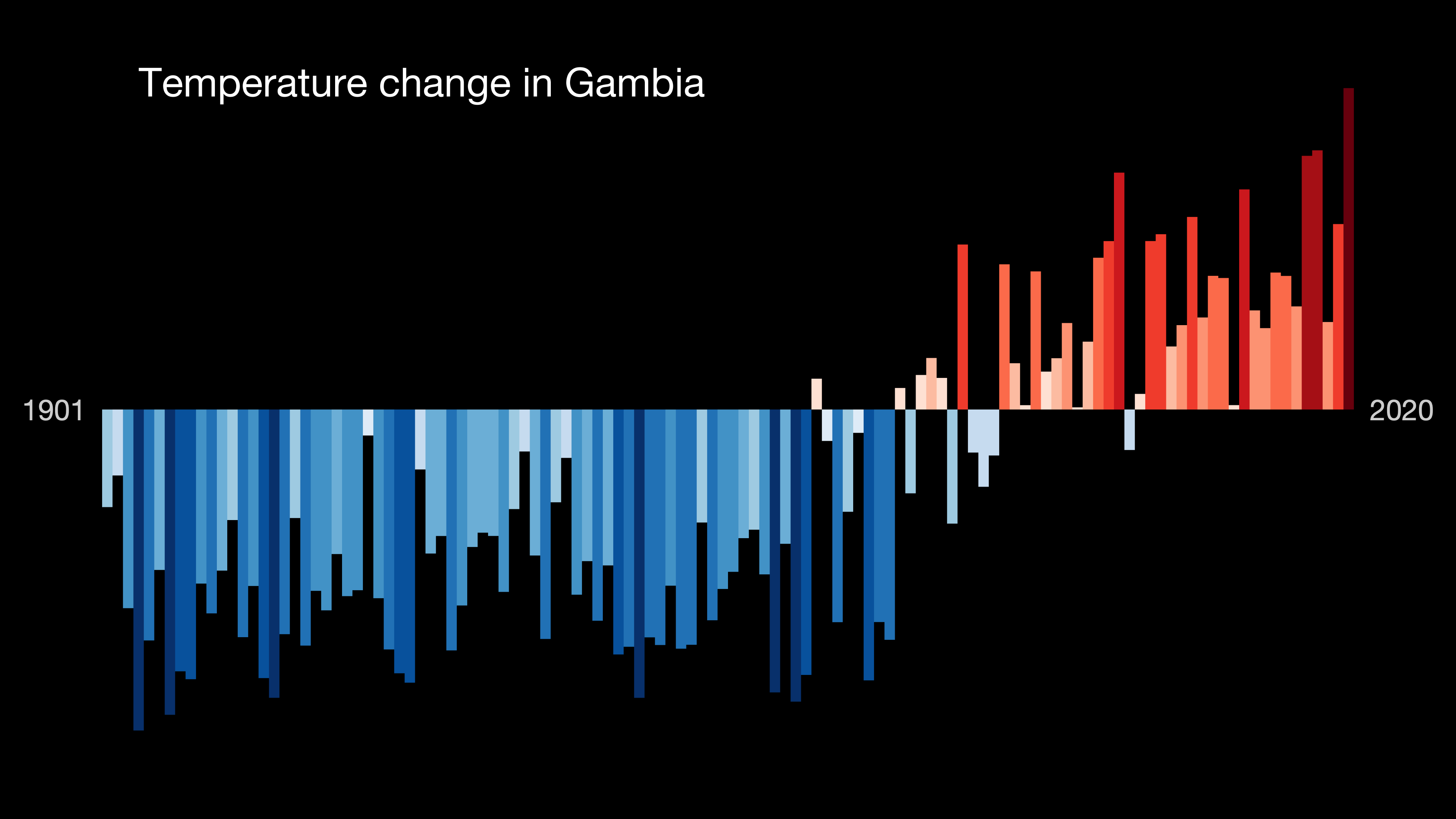
This bar chart is a visual representation of the change in temperature in the past 100+ years. Each stripe represents the temperature averaged over a year. The average temperature in 1971–2000 is set as the boundary between blue and red colors, and the color scale varies from ±2.6 standard deviations of the annual average temperatures between the years mentioned in the file name. Data source: Berkeley Earth. For more information visit https://showyourstripes.info/faq

The Sahel climate makes the eco region particularly vulnerable to changes in water. Climate change is expected to increase or make more severe windstorms, floods, droughts, and coastal erosion and saltwater intrusion.

=== Temperature and weather changes ===
Since the 1940 to around 2010, the temperatures in the West Africa have noticeably increased and since 1960, the mean annual temperatures in Gambia have increased by 1.0 °C with an average rate of 0.21 °C per decade.

Gambia experiences a Sahelian climate which is characterized by long, dry seasons between November to may and a short, wet season between June to October. During dry seasons, the average temperatures range between 18 °C to 30 °C and 23 °C to 33 °C during wet seasons.

== Impacts on people ==
=== Economic impacts ===
Agriculture is 26% of the GDP and employs 68% of the labor force. Much of the agriculture is rain fed, so changes in precipitation will have significant impacts. In 2012, drought plus increased food prices led to a food crisis in the region. Rice farmers near the coast are also experiencing saltwater intrusion.

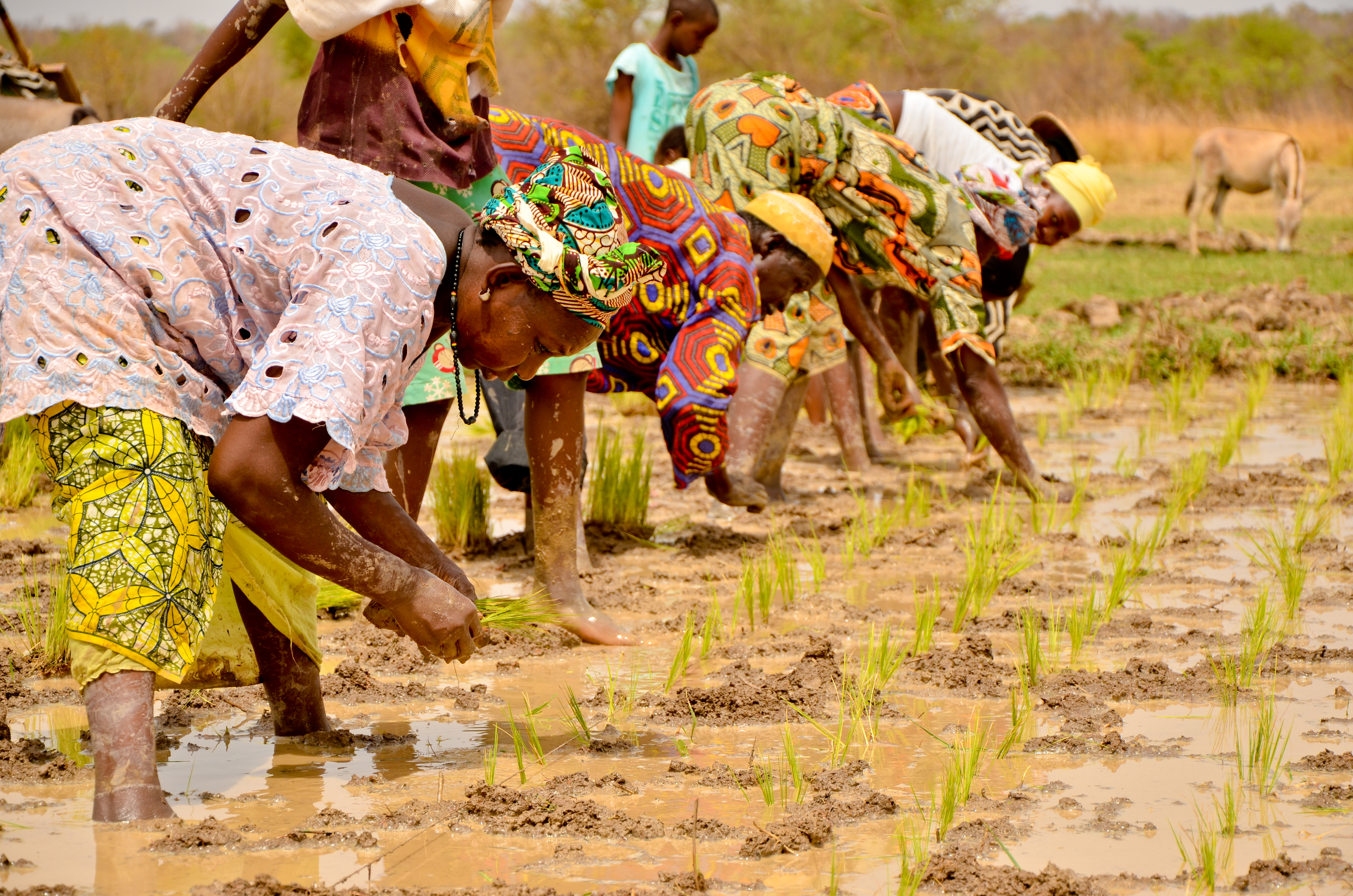
Gambian Rice Fields

Fisheries are also vulnerable, with changes to breeding grounds for coastal fishery species putting additional pressure on already unsustainable fishery practices.

Infrastructure is already seeing major losses from flooding and windstorms. For example, urban floods in 2020 severely damaged at least 2371 houses, and destroyed crops.

== Mitigation and adaptation ==
=== Policies and legislation ===
The Gambia has published a Climate Change Priority Action Plan that focuses on 24 cross-sectoral activities.

=== International cooperation ===
United Nations Environment Programme started a $20.5 million project in partnership with the Government of Gambia to restore forests and marginal agricultural land.
