= Agriculture in the Gambia =

Agriculture makes up a significant proportion of the Gambia's economy, comprising 25% of its GDP. About 75% of workers in the Gambia are employed within the agricultural industry. The main cash crops produced in the country are groundnuts (also known as peanuts), millet, sorghum, mangoes, corn, sesame, palm kernel, and cashews. The main staple crop produced is rice.

Though agriculture is a major part of the Gambia's economy, food insecurity is still an issue for the population. Crop outputs only supply about 50% of the population's food needs due to low crop yields. The population heavily relies on rice, needing 398,364 metric tons each year. The Gambia only produces about 22,706 metric tons of rice each year. As a result, it needs to import around 80–90% of its rice each year. Although around 45% of land in the Gambia is used for groundnut farming, a majority of groundnuts produced are exported, further contributing to food insecurity.

Climate change is also impacting agriculture in the Gambia. Crop yields are impacted by rising temperatures and seasonal drought. Salt water is mixing with freshwater in the River Gambia due to rising sea levels, causing salt erosion in rice crop fields. Land development is also not abundant. Some experts have proposed addressing these issues with crop yields by developing strong irrigation systems, which they note could be supplied through rainwater, the River Gambia, and underground water.

== Major agricultural products ==
=== Cash crops ===
The Gambia's economy primarily relies on the export of groundnuts (peanuts), sorghum, and millet. The Gambia also produces mangoes, corn, sesame, palm kernel, and cashews. Nevertheless, the groundnut trade has historically been prioritized by the Gambian government over time, having many implications for the country's economic growth, development, and stability.

==== Groundnut ====
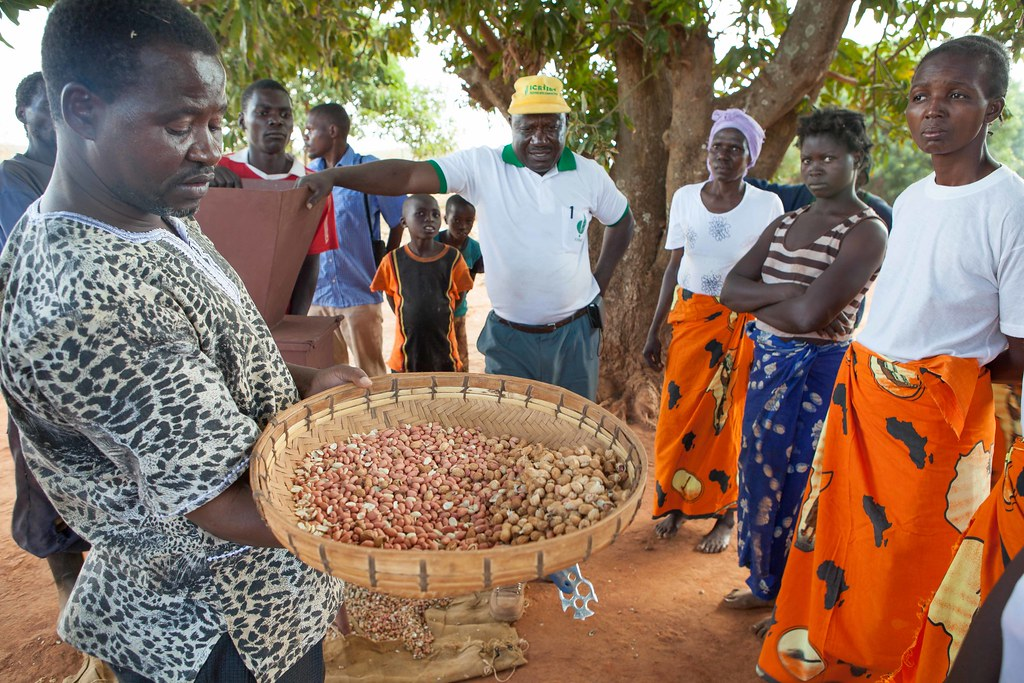
This is an example of what groundnuts look like after harvest

In the country's economy, the main export or cash crop is the groundnut (also known as the peanut). In 2002, the crop made up 6% of The Gambia's GDP. Around 60% of the groundnut production is exported while the remaining 30% is domestically consumed. The country has used about 45% of its land to grow the crop. Although the Portuguese initially brought groundnuts to The Gambia in the 1700s, its trade was started by the British in 1820 with increasing demand for groundnuts in North America and Europe, notably in Britain and France, being used to make such products as industrial oil, candles, and soap.

The groundnut trade expanded in the late 1870s as a large portion of its new primary commodities trade which was a result of the transatlantic slave trade's collapse. Groundnuts turned into the only agricultural asset to the Gambian economy by 1904, the lack of diversity in the sector concerning the government. When the groundnut sub-sector was reformed in the midst of labor shortages, the country employed foreign farmers from neighboring countries to increase groundnut exports. These foreign farmers were recruited during the time when it was raining. There were 32,220 foreign farmers in 1915, producing an average of one third of groundnut exports per year. This led to population growth, the 1924 establishment of the Department of Agriculture, and the groundnut trade's expansion as the number of local farmers grew and foreign farmers established themselves in The Gambia. The long term result of prioritizing groundnut exports was that The Gambia was producing more for export and less for domestic consumption because of increasing demand for the groundnut and because of incentives from the British colonial power. The prioritizing of producing more for international trade and less to support domestic demand continued after independence.

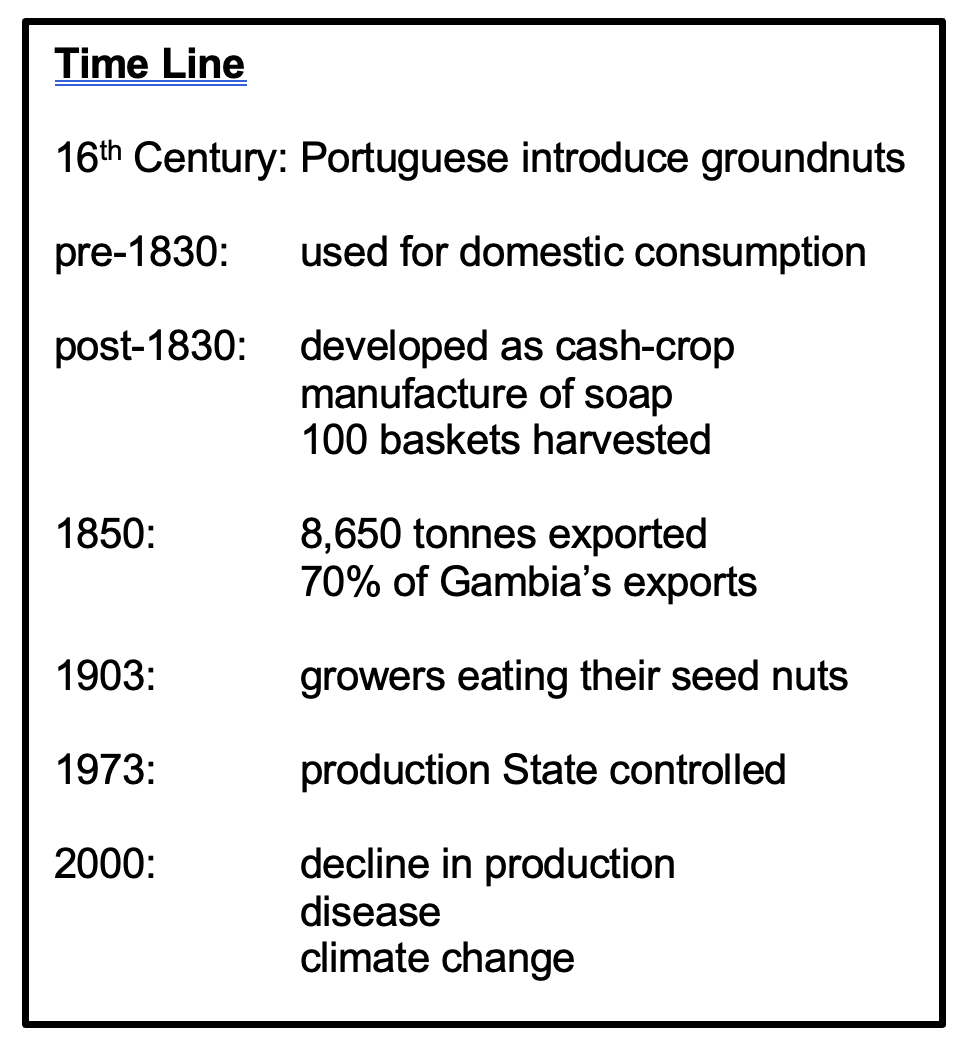
Broad timeline for groundnut production in The Gambia

Even before independence in 1965, two methods were employed to make for more fertile land to increase the production of groundnut exports. The fallow system was one in which a given piece of land was not grown on for 15 to 30 years. The second system was where farmers also interchanged or grew different crops in one piece of land. Both of them were dependent on enough arable land being available. As the population gradually increased, the duration of uncultivated land decreased which made for more land being grown on per year with more labor. Growing on more land gave farmers hardly anything in return which led to a decrease in groundnut yields as well as in farm incomes used to buy food. In response, in 1940, the Gambian government subsidized food imports and mechanized agricultural work usually done with human labor. The above did not address food insecurity and the food import subsidy was costly for the government. The government did not have an option but to start importing rice at which point it became the most important crop for ordinary Gambians' diet.

=== Rice ===
Fast-paced urbanization coupled with increased demand for rice has been a common trend within many African countries, including in The Gambia. For many African families and workers that have lifestyles outside of the agricultural sector, it is more time efficient to prepare milled rice than other locally grown cereals for food. Thus, in The Gambia, rice is the single most critical food source, more for the urban than rural population. As of the country's independence in 1965, about 15% of the population lived in cities. This number has grown to 57% in 2009, further heightening the country's reliance on rice. Rice is also highly relied on for food in urban centers because a lot of governments on the continent subsidize rice to keep the urban population satisfied while feeding them.

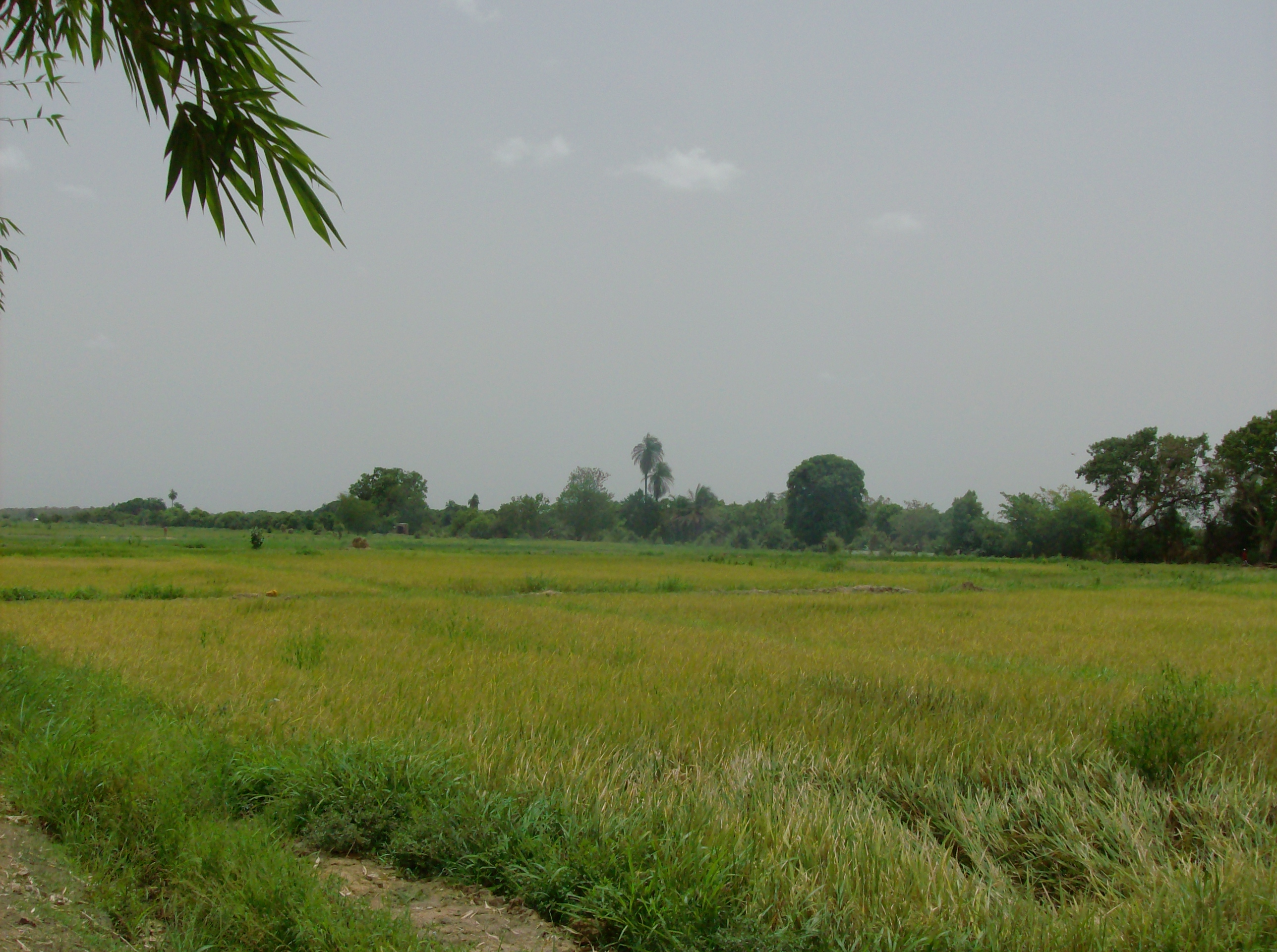
Rice field in the Senegambia region

Initially, during the colonial period and by independence, native Asian rice surpassed the African variety in domestic production. During this period, locally-grown rice was abundant in The Gambia. Groundnut production increased due to foreign farmers coming to the country to work, further pushing The Gambia into the global economy. The above eventually made the production of groundnuts for export surpass that of rice within The Gambia. Rice's domestic production further decreased as seasonal droughts started to impact rice crop yields. Economic reforms passed in the 1980s that exchanged producer-protection subsidies with more market-based solutions and cheap imports also reduced local rice production. At the same time, rice farmers, most of them being women, could not keep up with increasing urban demand for rice as seasonal famine increased in severity. The Gambia ultimately started to heavily rely on rice imports because it did not prioritize rice production. Currently, imports make up around 80–90% of rice consumed per year.

== Food insecurity ==
The Gambia deals with high levels of food insecurity. About two thirds of The Gambian population lives in inland rural areas where they produce just enough rice for themselves, but not enough for the rest of the population that lives along the western urban coast. Because the country does not produce enough rice to meet domestic food needs, it imports about 80–90% of its rice, most of the rice coming from Southeast Asia. A significant amount of this imported rice is diverted away from food security efforts toward re-exportation to neighboring Senegal and Guinea. This decline in domestically grown rice for the population's consumption began in the mid-1980s. From 1983 to 1989, rice imports increased from 16,200 to 52,800 tons while local production decreased from 33,700 to 29,500 tons and the presence of domestic rice in the national market decreased from 50% to 15%. Since 2000, domestic share has stayed at about 20,000 tons of paddy.

Locally grown millet as an alternative cereal to imported rice is growing in prevalence. Some argue that increased millet production might help reduce food insecurity in The Gambia and that millet is also a healthier option because it is not refined in the same way as rice. There was a millet production growth rate of 7% from 1992 to 2007, but one largely due to an increase in the amount of land used to produce millet instead of an increase in yield. Thus, some find it unclear how soon or successfully millet production will increase to the level needed to greatly impact food security.

== Government ==
=== First Republic reforms ===
The First Republic started in 1965 when The Gambia gained independence from Britain. The government was run by President Dawda Jawara and lasted until 1994, when a coup overthrew Jawara. During Jawara's term, the government started developing the agricultural sector by taking such steps as increasing extension programs. For example, The Gambia Central Co-operative Banking and Marketing Union was turned into an independent agency, and began buying farmer crops in cash and providing farmer credit in exchange for better production. The government also decided to excuse all loan repayments issued in 1979 and 1980 in an effort to support agricultural sector development.

In the midst of food security and government budget crises in the 1970s, the government instituted an Economic Recovery Program in 1985 that focused on market-based approaches to supporting agriculture. Institutions such as The Gambia Commercial and Development Bank were privatized. In 1993, The Gambia Produce Marketing Board was privatized into the Gambia Groundnut Corporation. These changes eliminated credit and government-funded subsidies while reducing spending on agricultural extension programs. This was done to incentivize innovation and competition in the agricultural industry, and promote self-sufficiency by making producer prices more predictable.

=== Second Republic reforms ===
In 1994, a coup displaced Jawara from power and put Yahya Jammeh in charge. This lasted until 1996, when the Second Republic officially began. Jammeh remained the president of The Gambia until 2017 when Adama Barrow took over.

The Vision 2020, initially proposed in 1996 and officially passed in 2006, was an agricultural policy plan initiated under Jammeh. It focused on increasing production for domestic consumption and foreign export as well as expanding the range of crops produced in The Gambia. The plan emphasized the importance of developing more sustainable irrigation practices and increasing mechanization technology. The plan was also meant to help create more jobs and reduce income inequality between rural and urban areas. Finally, the plan aimed to use agriculture to develop other industries such as tourism.

Within the Vision 2020 plan, Jammeh especially focused on the mechanization of farming practices as his main goal for revitalizing the agricultural sector. He hoped that by increasing mechanization he could increase cereal, rice, and groundnut production, and ultimately reduce food insecurity. To help increase mechanization, The Gambia brought 20 four wheeler tractors in 1996. By 2001, more than 70 tractors were circulating in the country and currently, more than 500 tractors are circulating.

While cultivated land and crop yields have somewhat increased, mechanization was not quite achieved. Many farmers still choose to use animals instead of the tractors, claiming that the tractors are poorly designed for the soil and cause erosion.

=== Recent policies and plans ===
The Gambia still deals with food security as the price of rice has continued to rise. The National Development Plan, initiated in 2018 as a follow-up to the government's The Vision 2020 plan, is being introduced as the government's solution to these issues.

The effectiveness of the market-based approach to agricultural policies introduced by Jawara and continued under Jammeh is contested. Some experts claim that this shift toward privatization worsened the structural impediments to agricultural growth, such as the expensive transportation of crops. Others contend that the market-based approach will be effective in the long run.

The National Development Plan intends to keep the market-based approach as the framework for agricultural development, by supporting agribusiness and modernizing farming technologies. It also includes plans for implementing more sustainable farming practices including water collection and land development. Important to the plan is support for the diversification of crop production and a stop to the reliance on groundnuts as the main cash crop and rice as the main staple crop. Finally, the government plans on developing the fishing industry as a way to address food insecurity, generate jobs, and relieve some of the pressure to cultivate high crop yields.

== Foreign involvement ==
=== Aid programs ===
The Gambia is provided with a significant amount of foreign aid. According to the World Bank, Official Development Assistance (ODA) provides just under 200 million USD to The Gambia each year. In addition to ODA, many international organizations, NGOs, and other charitable organizations and individuals provide assistance to The Gambia. In 2018, total foreign aid from international benefactors reached as high as $1.7 billion, as that was the year The Gambia initiated the National Development Plan.

Several foreign aid programs are dedicated to specifically developing agriculture within The Gambia. The Gambia Inclusive and Resilient Agricultural Value Chain Development Project (GIRAV) began in 2021. GIRAV will provide $40 million to The Gambia via the International Development Association, housed within The World Bank. GIRAV's main objective is to use grant matching to support agri-business and sustainable farming practices. It will also prioritize women, who will receive at least half of the funds provided through the project.

The Resilience of Organizations for Transformative Smallholder Agriculture was also started in 2021 and pledges just over 80 million USD toward developing agriculture to help with food insecurity and health. It is funded by the International Fund for Agriculture Development and the French Development Agency.

The Food and Agriculture Sector Development Project (FASDEP) is organized by the Global Agriculture and Food Security Program in collaboration with The Gambian government. FASDEP's main focus is on small-scale farms which often lack the technology needed to successfully develop land and prevent negative impacts from climate change. This program has focused on assistance for women, who tend to work on the small farms aided by FASDEP.

=== Taiwan/China rice irrigation project ===
The Gambia developed diplomatic relations with Taiwan starting in the mid-1960s. The relationship was bilateral, with The Gambia wanting to support Taiwan's independence and Taiwan trying to help The Gambia improve its rice production. Taiwan attempted to mechanize rice production in The Gambia through technical missions between 1966 and 1974. The goal was for rice production in The Gambia to be year-round instead of seasonal, resulting in two harvests per year instead of one. One harvest was to serve for local consumption while the other was to serve as a cash crop that would help farmers increase their incomes. There were about 20,000 hectares of rice grown and 1,200 hectares of rice irrigation scheme constructed by Taiwan in 1966 that ran on pumps dependent on diesel. During the project's initial year, farmers received free seeds, fertilizers, and fuel to encourage them to sustain themselves by the next few years. These inputs were then offered at low cost. Domestically, between 1966 and 1971, there was an increase in rice cultivation from 20,400 tons to 32,000 tons. Production then decreased throughout the 1970s when China replaced Taiwan as the project's foreign manager from 1974 until 1979. Under Taiwan, the project had some technical issues, but experts note that under China's leadership, not even half of the project's land Taiwan established was used. Additionally, farmers had to pay high amounts of credit since the project took place during declining groundnut production and the Sahelian droughts that started in 1970 and lasted until 1977. Furthermore, a majority of rice growers in The Gambia are women and the new year-round harvesting schedule forced women to work more while not receiving profit off the extra effort. Lastly, there was no priority in oversight and funding for the construction of a mill to increase the rice paddy production. Rice irrigation projects completely ended in the mid-1980s. No current relationship between The Gambia and Taiwan or China exists as The Gambia has shifted focus towards reforming its domestic market and importing its rice from Southeast Asia.

== Employment ==
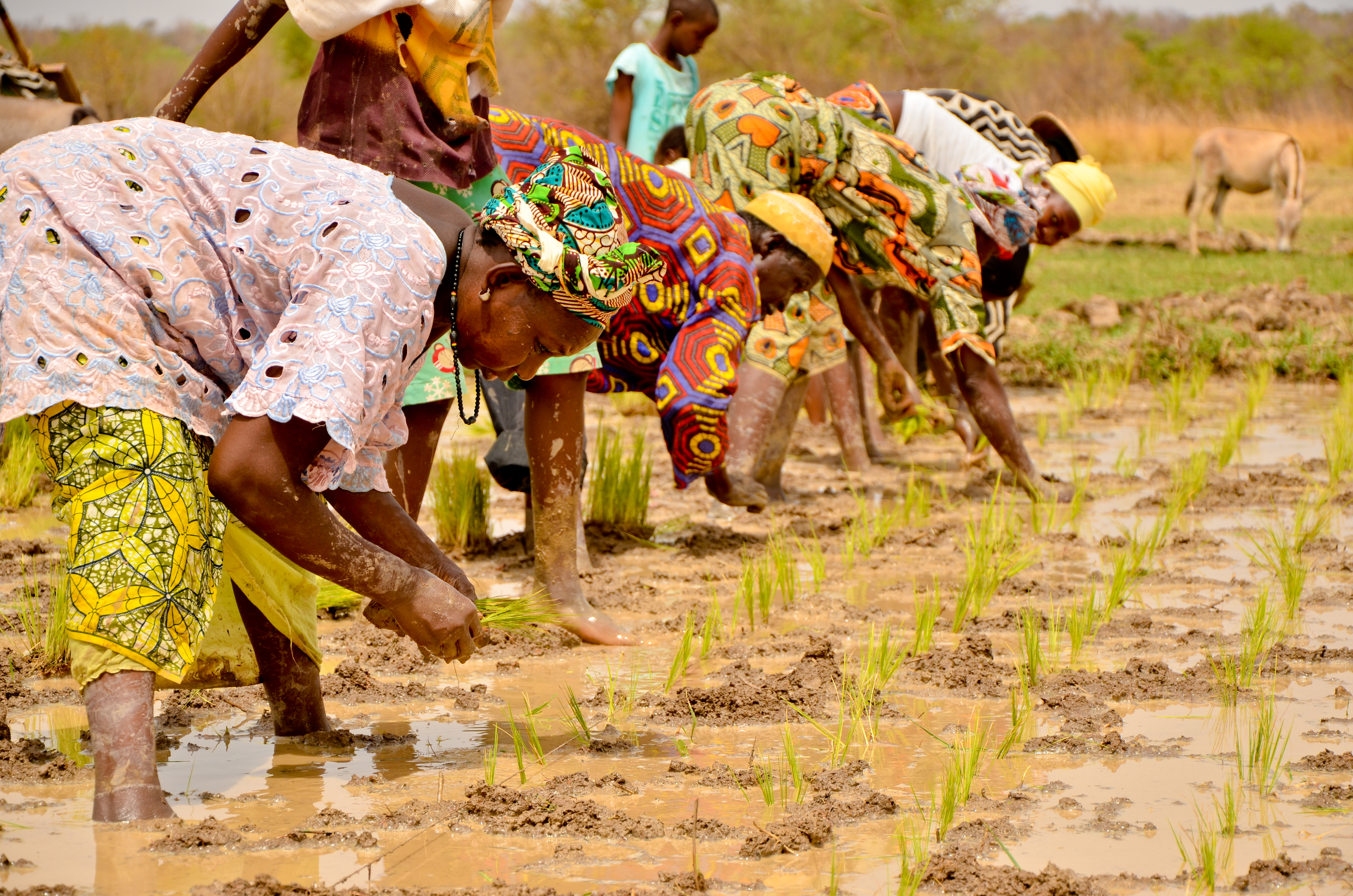
Women working in a rice field in The Gambia

Gambia has the highest proportion of women working in agriculture, forestry and fishing in the world.

75% of laborers in The Gambia work in agriculture. About 70% of those employed in agriculture are women, who tend to do more manual field work. In contrast, men more often serve as agricultural land managers or owners. Rice cultivation primarily employs women, who have served as the main rice farmers since the pre-colonial era. While women manage the staple crops, men are more involved in cash crop, especially groundnut, production.

Experts assert that migration, both from rural to urban areas within The Gambia and out of The Gambia altogether, has positive and negative effects on employment. Money sent back to families and communities from those who have migrated helps finance experiences and resources that stimulate employment. For example, this extra money can be spent toward education, training, and better farming resources and technology. Experts argue that there are negative impacts as well, such as a reduction in available labor.

== Land ownership ==
The Gambian Constitution includes several anti-discrimination protections. Article 17[2] states that all people regardless of identity (such as race, gender, religion, etc.) will be provided certain fundamental human rights. Article 22[1] guarantees that property will not be taken away from someone unless it is done to promote the public good. Section 28[2] guarantees that men and women will be treated equally and be given equal access to participation in society.

Section 33[5] holds that anti-discrimination stipulations in the Constitution do not apply to personal law situations such as marriage and divorce, burial practices, and property transfer. Because 95% of The Gambia's population follows Shari'a law, many experts contend that Section 33[5] allows unequal access to land ownership for women. Under Shari'a law, women must borrow land from their husbands. If they are unwed or divorced, they must work on their family's land. Women are also restricted from harvesting certain crops. For example, in The Gambia, trees belong to those who plant them, so women are often not allowed to plant trees because land owners do not want women to have permanent claim to the land.

Experts, including those from the International Fund for Agricultural Development, agree that complex structural barriers to women gaining land ownership also exist. Some argue that the process of registering through title deeds and certifications is not always possible or even fully understood by women or local officials. They also hold that taxes levied on land registration can also create a financial barrier to land ownership.

A few policies have been passed to help mitigate land ownership inequality. The National Policy for the Advancement of Women was passed by the National Assembly in 1999 to help with a myriad of gender inequality issues, including land ownership. The Lowlands Agricultural Development Programme, lasting from 1997 to 2005, disbursed lowland property, originally owned by colonizers, to 22,000 women who helped develop the land. More recently, The Women's Act was passed in 2010 to bring The Gambia into compliance with CEDAW. It reaffirmed the rights to land ownership guaranteed in the Constitution, including the right to inherit and manage land. Some experts say personal law still regulates much of the land inheritance and distribution in the Gambia, making it difficult for women to achieve land ownership equality.

== Environment ==
=== Climate change effects ===
The agriculture sector in The Gambia is impacted by rising temperatures, increasing sea levels, and droughts. There was a long and significant drought in the Sahel in 2012, and droughts have become increasingly common since. Because rice cultivation is largely sustained through rainwater, versus a manufactured irrigation system, rice crops are impacted by a lack of freshwater. This issue is compounded by seawater overflowing into rice fields, causing soil contamination and salt erosion. Because The Gambia is a coastal country, it will also need to deal with receding land along the coast. As more saltwater travels upstream within The River Gambia, the saltwater can also be destructive to fish populations, gradually curbing The Gambia's plan to develop the fishing industry.

=== Resilience efforts ===
Some international organizations, coupled with The Gambian government, are helping fund efforts toward reversing climate change effects on land and agriculture. For example, The Large-scale Ecosystem-based Adaptation Project in The Gambia was started in 2018. It is funded primarily by the Green Climate Fund (20.5 million USD) with The Gambian government providing another 5 million USD. This project is dedicated to both the restoration of forests and agricultural land and the implementation of sustainable technologies and practices moving forward. Another project addressing climate change is Scaling up Climate Resilient Rice Production in West Africa initiated in 2021. The Ministry of Agriculture is being provided with 14 million USD to support climate resilience efforts among rice farmers.

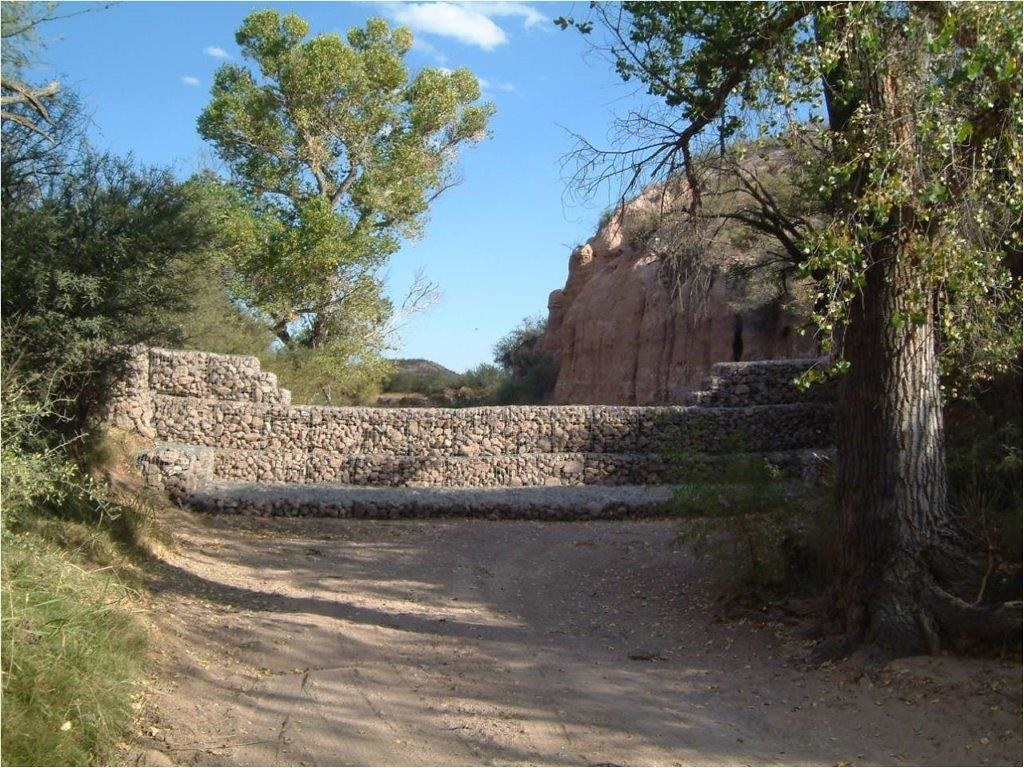
Example of a gabion wall

In addition to international monetary support toward land development and climate change mitigations, local Gambian farmers are taking steps to address the impacts of climate change. They have been working to implement contour bunds, lines of rock that allow farmers to help control irrigation, as well as gabions, buildup of rock and wire mesh that help reduce water runoff and subsequent salt erosion. Local farmers are also working to develop their livestock supplies as well as food reserves to deal with failing crops in the immediate term.
