= Postal strike =

The term postal strike or mail strike may refer to:

- U.S. postal strike of 1970
- 1971 United Kingdom postal workers strike
- 1988 United Kingdom postal workers strike
- 2007 Royal Mail industrial disputes
- 2009 Royal Mail industrial disputes
- 2022 United Kingdom postal workers strikes
- 2024–2025 Canada Post labour dispute
