= Rico Back =

German businessman

- Born: 1954 (age 71–72); Hamburg, Germany
- Occupation: Businessman
- Title: Former CEO, Royal Mail
- Term: June 2018 – May 2020
- Predecessor: Moya Greene
- Successor: Stuart Simpson (interim)
- Spouse: Married
- Children: 4

Rico Back (born 1954) is a German businessman. He was a founding member and former CEO of the logistics service provider German Parcel, which later became part of the GLS Group. He was CEO of GLS for around 18 years.

From 2016 to 2018, Back headed Royal Mail Parcels, and from 2018 to 2020 was CEO of Royal Mail.

Following his departure from Royal Mail, he founded SKR AG, an investment and advisory company, in 2020. He is also active in Back Enterprises AG, Back Asset Management AG, and Back Beteiligungs AG. In 2021, he took over as chairman of the board of Tiger Asset Management AG.

Back is also a frequent commentator on economic and logistics issues in business and trade media.

== Early life ==
Rico Back was born in 1954 in Hamburg, Germany.

== Career ==
In 1989, Back was a founding member and managing director of German Parcel, a European-wide parcel logistics firm. In 1999 Back led the sale of German Parcel to Royal Mail, subsequently rebranded as GLS. The company is now one of the largest ground-based deferred parcel networks in Europe. Its revenues grew from £1 billion in 2002 to £3.161 billion in 2020. It contributed 64% of Royal Mail Group's adjusted operating profit from 29% of group revenues. In 2020, the division was worth an estimated £2.3 billion based on an operating profit of £208 million.

Back was the CEO of GLS for 18 years before taking over as Royal Mail Group CEO in 2018. As CEO of Royal Mail Parcels (2016 to 2018), Back was responsible for all international activities as well as the national parcel business. He succeeded Moya Greene as Royal Mail Group CEO when she retired in June 2018. He received the same £790,000 pay and benefits package as Greene, plus a possible £1.3 million bonus and a £6 million golden hello; his personal taxes were paid in and to the UK.

During his tenure, UK parcel volume growth reached a four-year peak in 2018 and Royal Mail's share of the UK parcel market grew to 53% by volume by March 2018, driven by winning business from online retailers. In its 2019 full-year results, a year into Back's tenure as CEO, Royal Mail announced a five-year turnaround plan focused on expanding the company's parcels business internationally, addressing the growth in online deliveries. As part of the plan, Royal Mail pledged to invest a further £1.8 billion in its UK postal service.

On 15 May 2020, Back resigned as CEO of Royal Mail Group, with Keith Williams taking immediate control before being replaced as interim CEO by Stuart Simpson. His departure came as Royal Mail experienced a rise in parcel volumes and a downturn in letter volumes during the COVID-19 pandemic. The company's revenues annual revenues in April 2020 had fallen by £22 million against the previous year.

In 2020, Back founded SKR AG, a consultancy firm based in Switzerland that specialises in strategic management consulting for investors, executives, and companies. SKR AG operates internationally.

That same year, he also established Back Enterprises AG. In 2024, Back Asset Management AG and Back Beteiligungs AG were added. These companies are involved in investments in domestic and foreign companies, as well as providing advisory services to businesses.

== Personal life ==
Back and his family live in an apartment overlooking Lake Zurich, Switzerland, where they have been resident since 2007 and where he is legally domiciled.

Business positions
Preceded by Moya Greene	CEO of Royal Mail; 2018–2020	Succeeded by Keith Williams (Interim)
