= Stuart Simpson =

British businessman

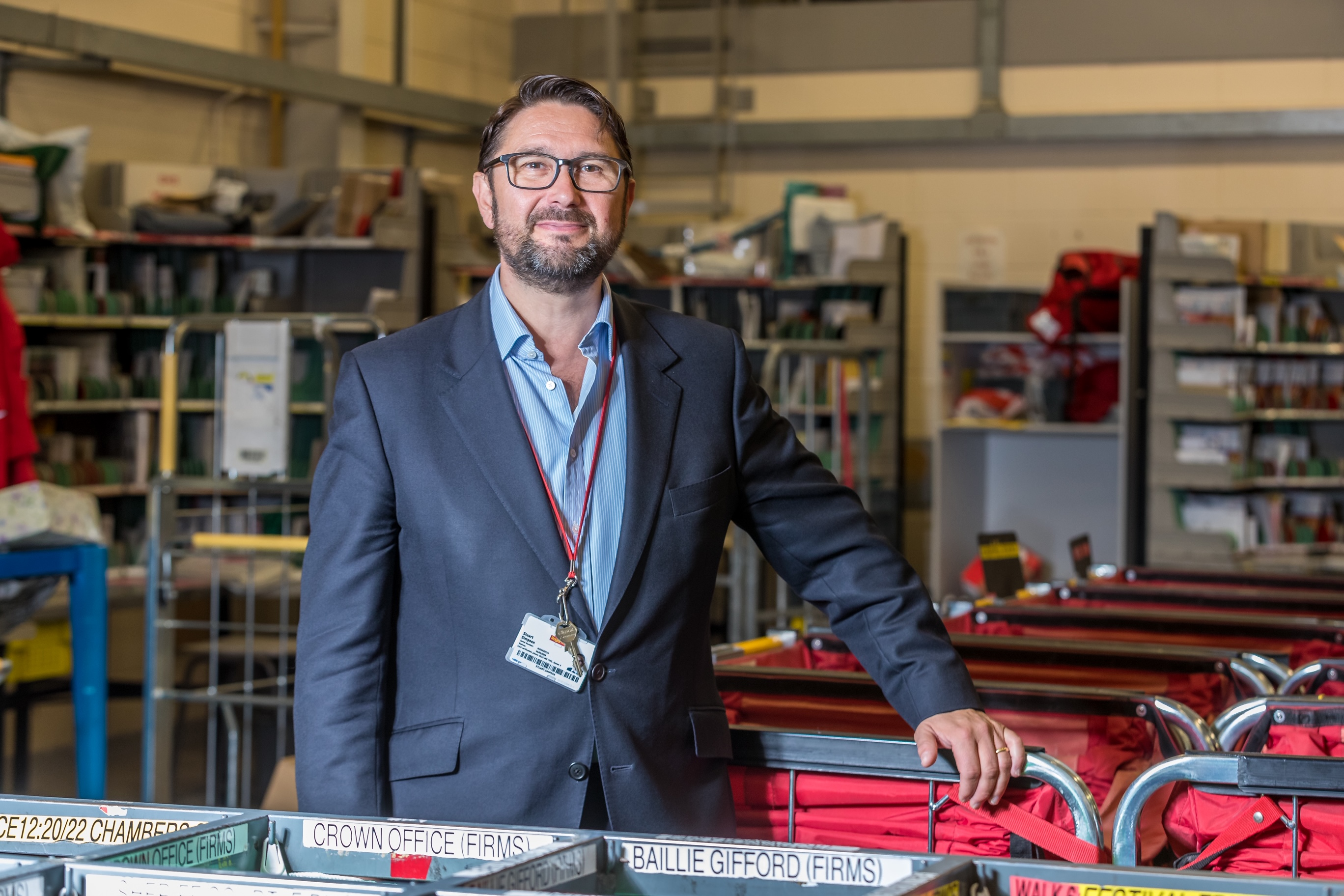
- Simpson visits a Royal Mail Delivery Office
- Education: Newcastle University

Stuart Simpson is a British businessman who was the interim Chief Executive Officer of Royal Mail, the UK postal service and courier company between May 2020 and January 2021. He was appointed to this role in 2020. Simpson is also a member of the Transport Services Trade Advisory Group.

== Education ==
Simpson holds a degree in Accounting and Financial Analysis from Newcastle University in the United Kingdom.

== Professional experience ==
Simpson first worked at Arthur Andersen as a Chartered Accountant in Transaction Services and Corporate Recovery. The bulk of his subsequent experience before joining Royal Mail was in the automotive industry in the UK and internationally: working in roles focused in finance, operations, planning and strategy, he joined Rolls-Royce & Bentley Motors in 1994, Vauxhall in 1996 and General Motors in 1998. He then went to Saab in 2001, returned to General Motors in 2003 and then moved to e2v in 2008.

Simpson has held various roles in Royal Mail prior to appointment as interim CEO in 2020. Joining the company in 2009 as Finance Director for Group Operations, he held the Chief Finance Officer role for almost two years before becoming CEO. He was replaced as CEO by Simon Thompson on 11 January 2021.

Business positions
| Preceded by Keith Williams (Interim) | CEO of Royal Mail; 2020–2021 | Succeeded by Simon Thompson |
