= Spanish practices =

British term for irregular or restrictive practices in workers' interests

The terms Spanish practices or old Spanish customs are British expressions that refer to irregular or restrictive practices in workers' interests. Typically, these are arrangements that have been negotiated in the past between employers and unions.

The issue arises because, in British law, a contract of employment consists of both expressed and implied terms. Implied terms can arise through "custom and practice". Historically, alteration of these terms has been by negotiation and collective bargaining.

== Examples ==
For example, if it has been the habit to release staff when the day's work is done (such as, today's newspaper is printed), then that becomes the de facto contract of employment. If some workers are required to stay on to do additional tasks, then it may be more convenient to pay these workers to do so (since otherwise they are not being treated equitably and/or have no incentive to do so). Over many years of incremental negotiation, the original rationale may be lost and a point reached where all workers are being paid a supplement merely to complete a normal shift. With the benefit of hindsight, such an arrangement might be described as a "Spanish practice".

The expression was widely used in reporting the 2007 Royal Mail industrial disputes, the UK's national postal service. The term was used in an interview by Royal Mail Chief Executive Adam Crozier. Crozier described as "cobblers" claims by the Communication Workers Union deputy general secretary Dave Ward that the way Royal Mail made its employees work amounted to "slavery". According to Crozier, Royal Mail was "only trying to make people work the hours for which they were paid". He claimed there were 1,442 Spanish practices at Royal Mail a few years ago, and these had now been cut to 92. One example of such practices was paid overtime within normal working hours, after workers completed their scheduled delivery rounds early. Earlier, the term old Spanish customs was used in 1986 in reference to long-lasting industrial action in Fleet Street, traditionally the home of the UK's newspaper industry, for example the Wapping dispute.

Main types of "Spanish practices" include allowing workers to go home before the end of their shift if they have completed their scheduled work; negotiable paid overtime within normal working hours after completing scheduled work, regardless of remaining working hours; automatic overtime pay if production reaches a certain level regardless of remaining working hours; no overlap between functions in the same workplace (demarcation); and overtime pay to cover absence of colleagues.

== Implications and history ==
The term has been criticised as being pejorative. Since the days of strong unions in the 1960s and 1970s, Spanish practices have been increasingly removed from the workplace.

According to BBC Radio 4 presenter Nigel Rees, the terms have been used since the 1970s to describe malpractices among the trades unions, especially the print unions in Fleet Street. Speaking on Radio 4's Broadcasting House current affairs programme on Sunday 7 October 2007, Rees said: "As one knows, Spanish people are very hard-working, upright people. But I suppose one or two of them may tend to take the 'mañana' attitude."

Citing the origin of the term, Rees said usage goes back to the Elizabethan era. William Cecil, 1st Baron Burghley, described Sir Thomas Tresham II as being "not given to Spanish practices", meaning Roman Catholic practices, which at the time were censured in England. In 1584 another secretary of Queen Elizabeth I, Francis Walsingham, referred to Spanish practices in a way that meant they were "deceitful, perfidious and treacherous". This may well help to give the current meaning of the term.

== In popular culture ==
The season 6 finale of the American crime drama television series The Shield was called "Spanish Practices."

== See also ==
- África empieza en los Pirineos
