= Moya Greene =

Canadian businesswoman

Dame Moya Greene OC DBE
- Born: Moya Marguerite Greene; 10 June 1954 (age 72); St. John's, Newfoundland and Labrador, Canada
- Education: Osgoode Hall Law School; Memorial University of Newfoundland
- Known for: Former CEO, Royal Mail; Former CEO, Canada Post
- Spouses: Malcolm Rowe (divorced); Roger Springall (m. 2014)

Dame Moya Marguerite Greene OC DBE (born 10 June 1954) is a Canadian businesswoman who was the chief executive officer (CEO) of the Royal Mail from 2010 until 2018, having previously been the CEO of Canada Post.

== Early life and education ==
Moya Marguerite Greene was born on 10 June 1954, in St John's, Newfoundland, the daughter of Austin Greene, a DIY shop owner and Angela (née Cooke) Greene, a special education teacher, of Coley's Point. She graduated from Memorial University of Newfoundland with a Bachelor of Arts in 1974, and then attended Osgoode Hall Law School.

== Career ==
On graduation in 1979, she joined the Public Service of Canada in Ottawa as an immigration adjudicator, later taking positions in the Department of Labour and the Privy Council Office. In the later position as Assistant Deputy Minister for Transport Canada, she was responsible for transport, overseeing the privatisation of Canadian National Railway and the deregulation of the Canadian airline industry.

In 1996, she joined TD Securities as managing director of infrastructure finance and public private partnership. In 2000 she joined the Canadian Imperial Bank of Commerce as senior vice president and chief administrative officer, retail products. In 2003 she joined Bombardier as senior vice president, operational effectiveness, under CEO Paul Tellier. That same year she was named among the 100 most influential women in Canada by the National Post, and in 2004 as one of the Top 40 female corporate executives in Canada by the Ivey Business School.

After resigning from Bombardier at the end of 2004, following Tellier's departure, she was appointed president and chief executive officer of Canada Post on May 12, 2005. During her tenure, she placed emphasis on cost cutting through cutting absenteeism, increasing automation and improved labour relations. The result was a trebling of Canada Post's profits to C$281 million (£183 million), despite a 5.1 per cent drop in revenues, resulting in a two-year extension to her original five-year contract. However, in her last year of tenure, the Canadian Union of Postal Workers marked her fourth anniversary with a report card, with the CUPW's President Denis Lemelin commenting: "If you compare the four years before Greene with the four years under Greene's management, the numbers show that injuries have gone up 15.4% and grievances have gone up 59.3%."

On May 27, 2010, Greene was appointed Chief Executive-designate of Britain's Royal Mail. Replacing the departed Adam Crozier from early July, the first non-Briton and first woman to hold the post, she oversaw the privatisation of Britain's postal service. Greene was the highest paid UK Civil Servant in 2010, with a basic salary of £498,000. Her total compensation for 2012/13 was reported by the Royal Mail as £3.7 million.

Greene is also a member of the board of directors for the coffee shop chain Tim Hortons.

In February 2013 she was assessed as the 12th most powerful woman in Britain by Woman's Hour on BBC Radio 4.

In August 2013 she repaid £250,000 in expenses she had claimed to fund buying a house, after Business Secretary Vince Cable objected to the payment.

Greene was named as Financial Times Person of the Year in 2014. Judge Luke Johnson said "She did a fantastic job managing the unions, politicians and media and floating the business last year. It was an almost impossible task to reconcile demands from all the competing stakeholders – and sell a declining business such as post and parcel delivery to the stock market – but she pulled it off."

In September 2020, it was announced that Greene had been appointed by the Premier of Newfoundland and Labrador, Andrew Furey, as chair of the provincial government's newly established "Economic Recovery Team".

== Personal life ==
Greene has an adult daughter from her marriage to Malcolm Rowe, which ended in divorce. She wed Roger Springall, a British physician, in June 2014. She lives in Fulham, London.

Greene was appointed a Dame in the 2018 Birthday Honours Lists, and to the Order of Canada in 2019 Canadian Honours Lists.

Business positions
Preceded by Adam Crozier	CEO of Royal Mail; 2010–2018	Succeeded by Rico Back
