= Heathrow Worldwide Distribution Centre =

Royal Mail sorting office

Coordinates: 51°29′49″N 0°31′56″W

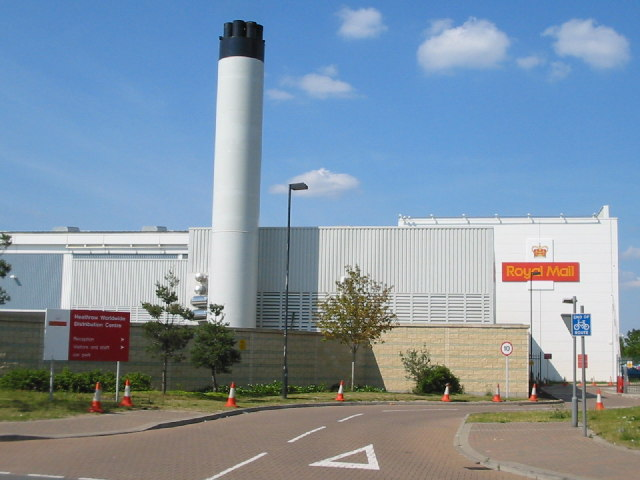
HWDC, Langley, Berkshire

Heathrow Worldwide Distribution Centre (HWDC) is a sorting office for inbound and outbound international mail operated by Royal Mail. Located close to Heathrow Airport, the HWDC is situated in the town of Langley, Berkshire, near Slough, and began operations in 2003. The centre is often referred to by its abbreviation, Langley HWDC, or as 'GBLALA' in mail tracking information.

== Sorting office ==
Most mail entering and leaving the United Kingdom is sorted at Heathrow Worldwide Distribution Centre under tight aviation security standards, following the closure of all other international mail handling facilities in the UK. Parcelforce Worldwide operates two hubs based at Coventry adjacent to the airport. One hub is for parcels for the United Kingdom, and the other for international parcels. Not all mail handled at HWDC arrives by air, as road vehicles that formerly arrived in the UK by ferry at the Port of Dover, or container ship at the Port of Southampton now extend their trip to HWDC by road, instead of entering the Royal Mail network at (now defunct) offices of exchange situated nearest the ports. Outbound mail will usually leave the country by aircraft from the nearby Heathrow Airport.

== Sorting and dispatch process ==
HWDC is one of the most automated postal centres in Europe, and the site covers 100,000 square metres (25 acres) (10 hectares).

Automated conveyor systems transport trays of mail to automated mail processing equipment and manual or special handling workstations. The conveyors read the bar code labels on the trays and then transport them to the desired destination. When the mail is sorted on the automated mail sorting equipment, the letter destination image is lifted by high speed optical cameras. Both inbound and outbound mail are then automatically sorted into groups.

Mail which is departing by air transport is often conveyed in unit load devices, unique to airlines and/or fuselage shapes. Upon arrival, specialised floor conveyors manipulate containers to support their manual loading. Frequently used containers are stored on site in a specialised automated storage and retrieval system. The scheduling of container arrival, loading, and dispatch is sequenced with flight arrival and departures.

== See also ==
- Royal Mail Mount Pleasant Sorting Office
