= Royal Mail =

Postal service company in the United Kingdom

Royal Mail Group Limited
- Logo used since 2024
- Trade name: Royal Mail
- Native name: Welsh: Post Brenhinol (Note: Official in Wales, along with English name.)
- Formerly: Consignia PLC (2001–2002); Royal Mail Group PLC (1992–2001)
- Type: Subsidiary
- Industry: Postal services; Courier
- Founded: 1516; 510 years ago (Master of Posts); 31 July 1635; 391 years ago (public service); 29 December 1660; 365 years ago (Post Office Act 1660)
- Founder: Henry VIII
- Headquarters: London, England
- Area served: United Kingdom
- Key people: Daniel Křetínský (Chairman) Alistair Cochrane (CEO)
- Services: Letter post; Parcel service; EMS; Delivery; Freight forwarding; Third-party logistics
- Parent: HM Government (1516–2013); International Distribution Services (2013–present)
- Subsidiaries: eCourier; Intersoft Systems & Programming; Parcelforce; StoreFeeder
- Website: royalmail.com

Royal Mail Group Limited, trading as Royal Mail, is a British postal service and courier company. It is owned by International Distribution Services. It operates the brands Royal Mail (letters and parcels) and Parcelforce Worldwide (parcels). Formed in 2001, the company used the name Consignia for a brief period but changed it soon afterwards. Prior to this date, Royal Mail and Parcelforce were (along with Post Office Counters Ltd) part of the Post Office, a state-owned enterprise the history of which is summarised below. Long before it came to be a company name, the "Royal Mail" brand had been used by the General Post Office to identify its distribution network (which over the centuries included horse-drawn mail coaches, horse carts and hand carts, ships, trains, vans, motorcycle combinations and aircraft).

The company provides mail collection and delivery services throughout the UK. Letters and parcels are deposited in post or parcel boxes, or are collected in bulk from businesses and transported to Royal Mail sorting offices. Royal Mail owns and maintains the UK's distinctive and iconic red pillar boxes, first introduced in 1852 (12 years after the first postage stamp, Penny Black), and other post boxes, many of which bear the royal cypher of the reigning monarch at the date of manufacture. Deliveries are made at least once every day except Sundays and bank holidays at uniform charges for all UK destinations. Royal Mail generally aims to make first class deliveries the next business day throughout the nation.

For most of its history, the Royal Mail was a public service, operating as a government department or public corporation. Following the Postal Services Act 2011, Royal Mail Group Limited became a wholly owned subsidiary of a new holding company, Royal Mail plc; a majority of the shares in Royal Mail plc were floated on the London Stock Exchange in 2013. Nine years later, Royal Mail plc was renamed International Distribution Services (IDS; of which Royal Mail Group Limited remains a wholly owned subsidiary). In April 2025, IDS was acquired by EP Group, a Czech-based company owned by Daniel Křetínský, for £3.6 billion. The government has retained a so-called golden share. The deal marked the first time the Royal Mail was under foreign ownership.

== History ==
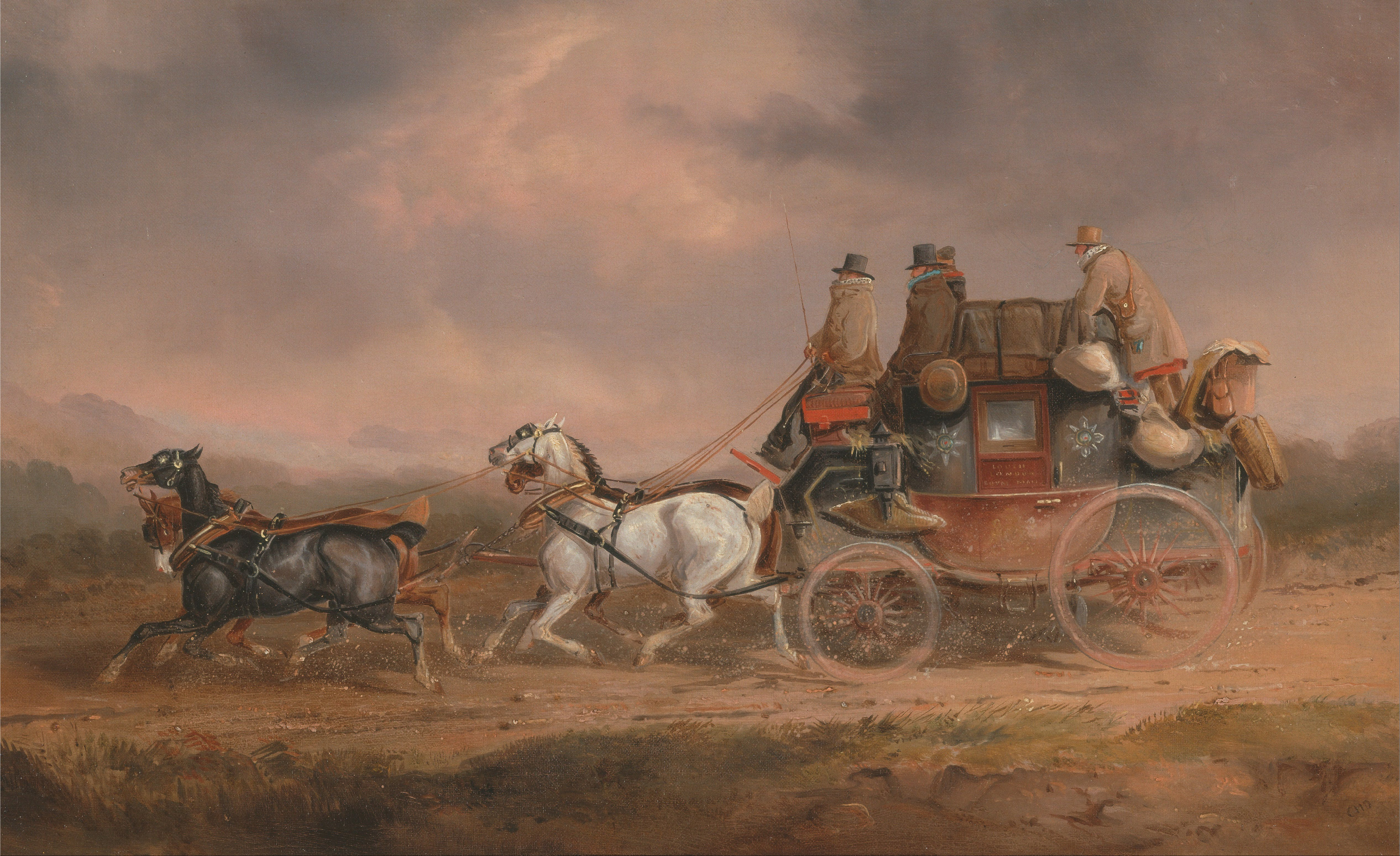
The Louth-London Royal Mail, by Charles Cooper Henderson, 1820

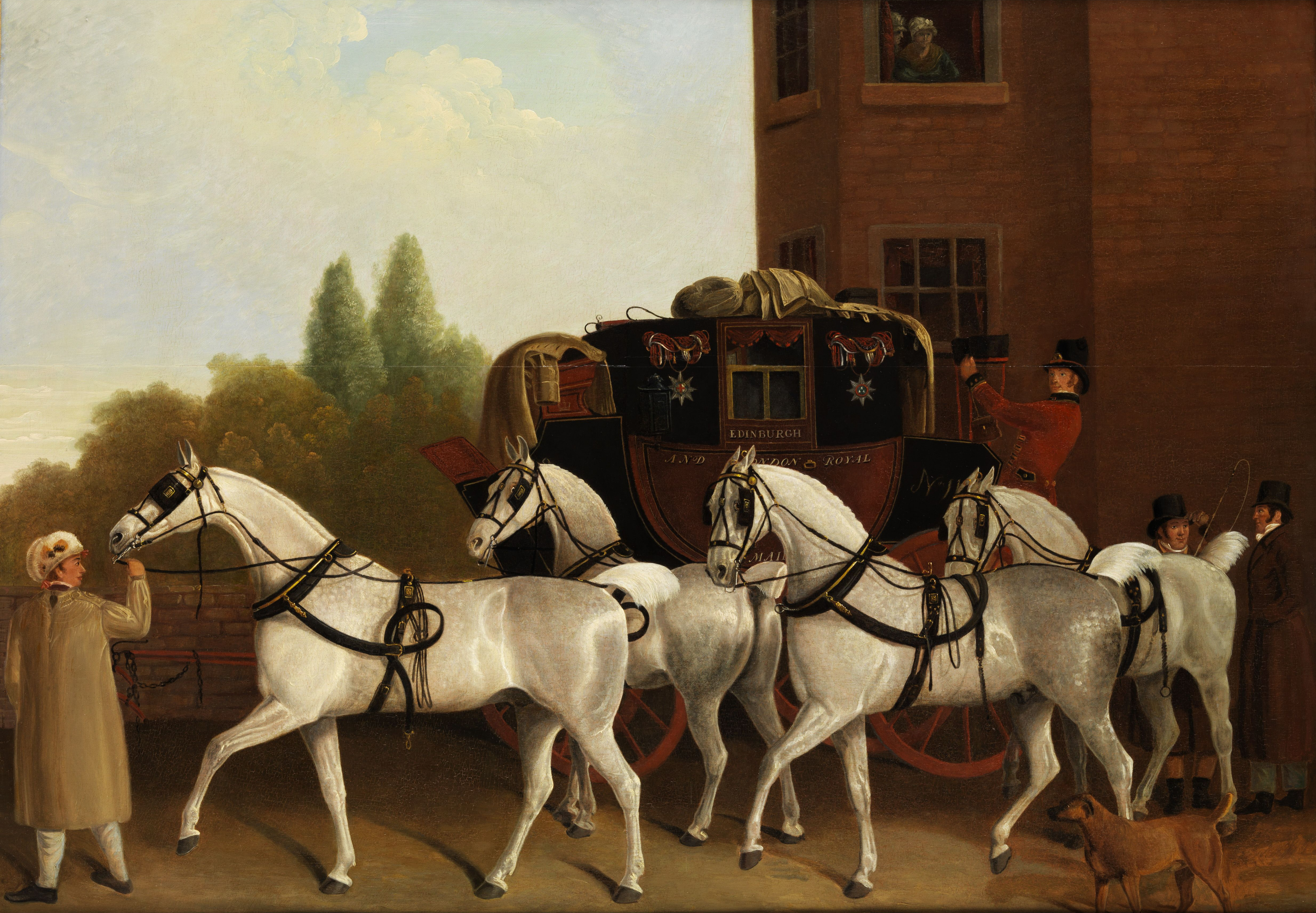
Edinburgh and London Royal Mail, by Jacques-Laurent Agasse

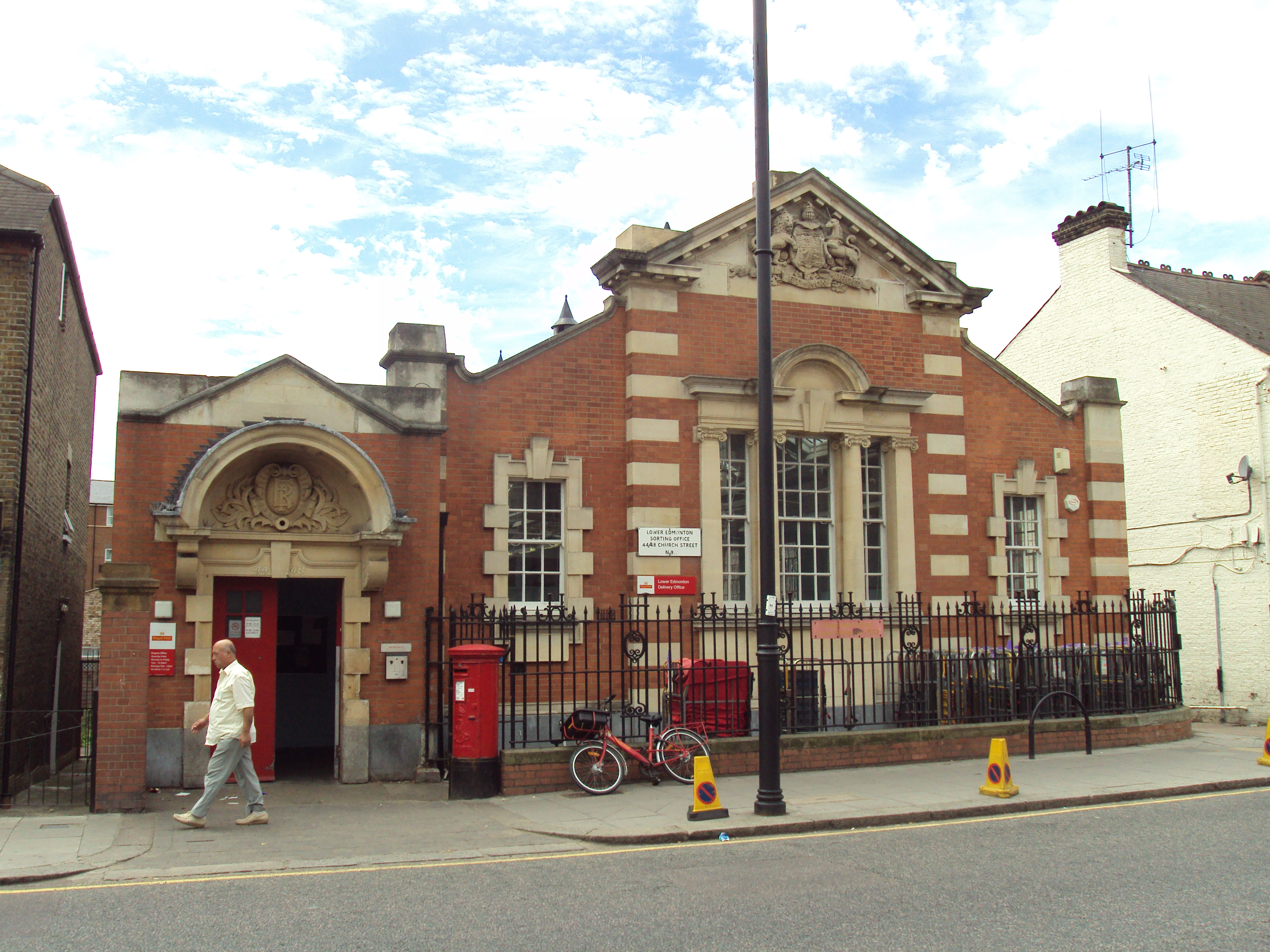
Lower Edmonton Royal Mail sorting office, in London

The Royal Mail can trace its history back to 1516, when Henry VIII established a "Master of the Posts", a position that was renamed "Postmaster General" in 1710.

Upon his accession to the throne of England at the Union of the Crowns in 1603, James VI of Scotland moved his court to London. One of his first acts from London was to establish the royal postal service between London and Edinburgh, in an attempt to retain control over the Scottish Privy Council.

=== Government office ===
The Royal Mail service was first made available to the public by Charles I on 31 July 1635, with postage being paid by the recipient. The monopoly was farmed out to Thomas Witherings.

In the 1640s, Parliament removed the monopoly from Witherings and during the Civil War and First Commonwealth the parliamentary postal service was run at great profit for himself by Edmund Prideaux (a prominent parliamentarian and lawyer who rose to be attorney-general). To keep his monopoly in those troubled times Prideaux improved efficiency and used both legal impediments and illegal methods.

In 1653, Parliament set aside all previous grants for postal services, and contracts were let for the inland and foreign mails to John Manley. Manley was given a monopoly on the postal service, which was effectively enforced by Protector Oliver Cromwell's government, and thanks to the improvements necessitated by the war, Manley ran a much-improved Post Office service. In July 1655, the Post Office was put under the direct government control of John Thurloe, a Secretary of State, best known to history as Cromwell's spymaster general. Previous English governments had tried to prevent conspirators from communicating; Thurloe preferred to deliver their post having surreptitiously read it. As the Protectorate claimed to govern all of Great Britain and Ireland under one unified government, on 9 June 1657 the Second Protectorate Parliament (which included Scottish and Irish MPs) passed the "Act for settling the Postage in England, Scotland and Ireland", which created one monopoly Post Office for the whole territory of the Commonwealth. The first Postmaster General was appointed in 1661, and a seal was first fixed to the mail.

Post Office Act 1660
- Act of Parliament
- Parliament of England
- Long title: An Act for Erecting and Establishing a Post Office.
- Citation: 12 Cha. 2. c. 35
- Territorial extent: England and Wales

Dates
- Royal assent: 29 December 1660
- Commencement: 25 April 1660 (Note: Start of session.)
- Repealed: 28 July 1863
Other legislation
Amended by	Post Office (Revenues) Act 1710
Repealed by	Statute Law Revision Act 1863
Relates to	Confirmation of Acts Act 1661; Settlement on Duke of York Act 1663; Post Office Revenues Act 1670

Status: Repealed

Text of statute as originally enacted

At the restoration of the monarchy, in 1660, all the ordinances and acts passed by parliaments during the Civil War and the Interregnum passed into oblivion, so the General Post Office (GPO) was officially established by Charles II under the Post Office Act 1660 (12 Cha. 2. c. 35).

Between 1719 and 1763, Ralph Allen, postmaster at Bath, signed a series of contracts with the post office to develop and expand Britain's postal network. He organised mail coaches which were provided by both Wilson & Company of London and Williams & Company of Bath. The early Royal Mail Coaches were similar to ordinary family coaches, but with Post Office livery.

The first mail coach ran in 1784, operating between Bristol and London. Delivery staff received uniforms for the first time in 1793, and the Post Office Investigation Branch was established. The first mail train ran in 1830, on the Liverpool and Manchester Railway. The Post Office's money order system was introduced in 1838.

==== Uniform penny postage ====
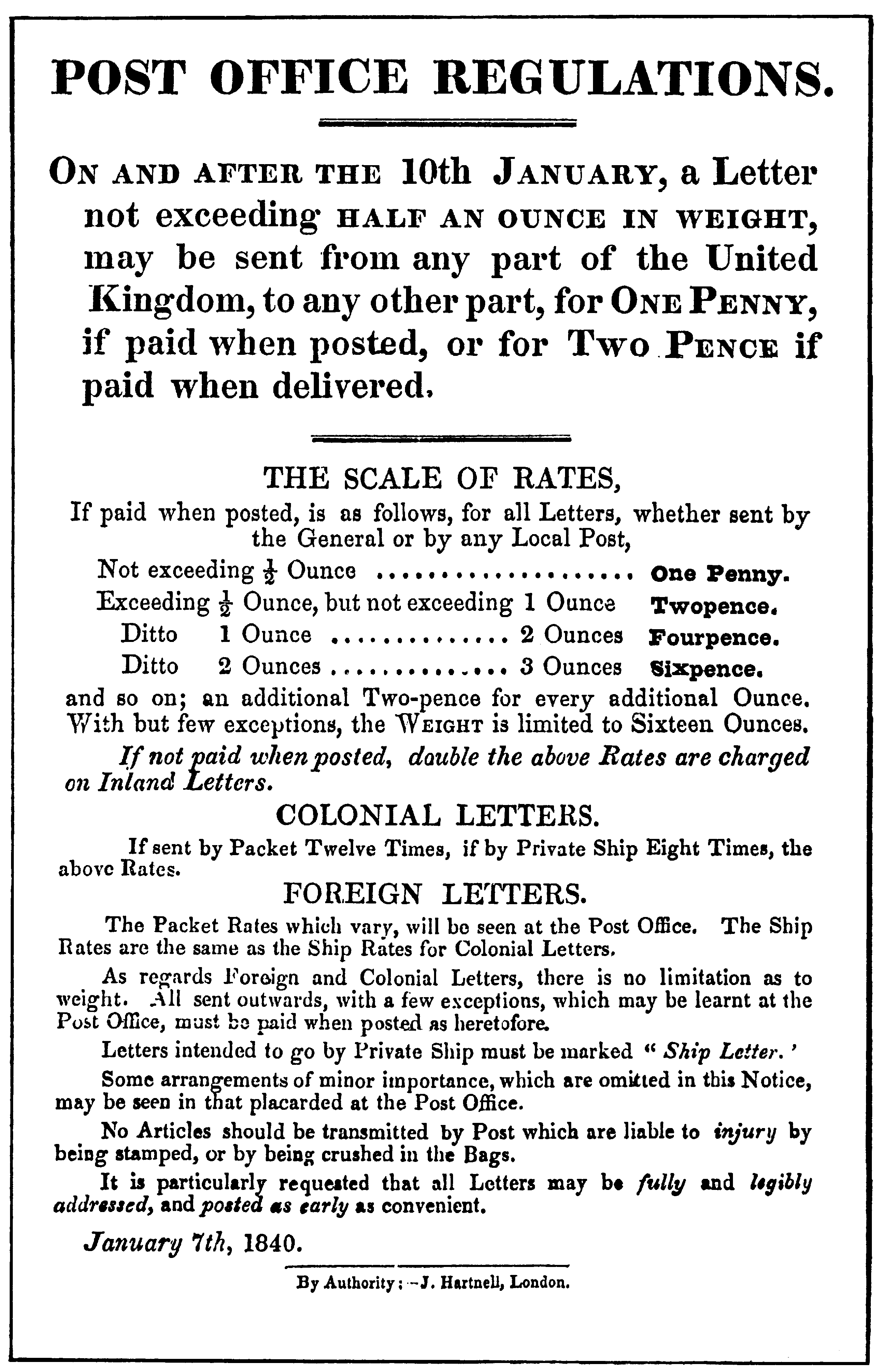
Royal Mail Post Office Regulations handbill giving details of the Uniform Penny Post, dated 7 January 1840

In December 1839, the first substantial reform started when postage rates were revised by the short-lived Uniform Fourpenny Post.

Rowland Hill, an English teacher, inventor and social reformer, became disillusioned with the postal service, and wrote a paper proposing reforms that resulted in an approach that would go on to change not only the Royal Mail, but also be copied by postal services around the world. His proposal was refused at the first attempt, but he overcame the political obstacles, and was appointed to implement and develop his ideas. He realised that many small purchases would fund the organisation and implemented this by changing it from a receiver-pays to a sender-pays system. This was used as the model for other postal services around the world, but also spilled over to the modern-day crowd-funding approach.

Greater changes took place when the Uniform Penny Post was introduced on 10 January 1840, whereby a single rate for delivery anywhere in Great Britain and Ireland was pre-paid by the sender. A few months later, to certify that postage had been paid on a letter, the sender could affix the first adhesive postage stamp, the Penny Black, which was available for use from 6 May the same year. Other innovations were the introduction of pre-paid William Mulready designed postal stationery letter sheets and envelopes.

As Britain was the first country to issue prepaid postage stamps, British stamps are the only stamps that do not bear the name of the country of issue on them.

By the late 19th century, there were between six and twelve mail deliveries per day in London, permitting correspondents to exchange multiple letters within a single day.

The first trial of the London Pneumatic Despatch Company was made in 1863, sending mail by underground rail between postal depots. The Post Office began its telegraph service in 1870.

==== Pillar boxes ====
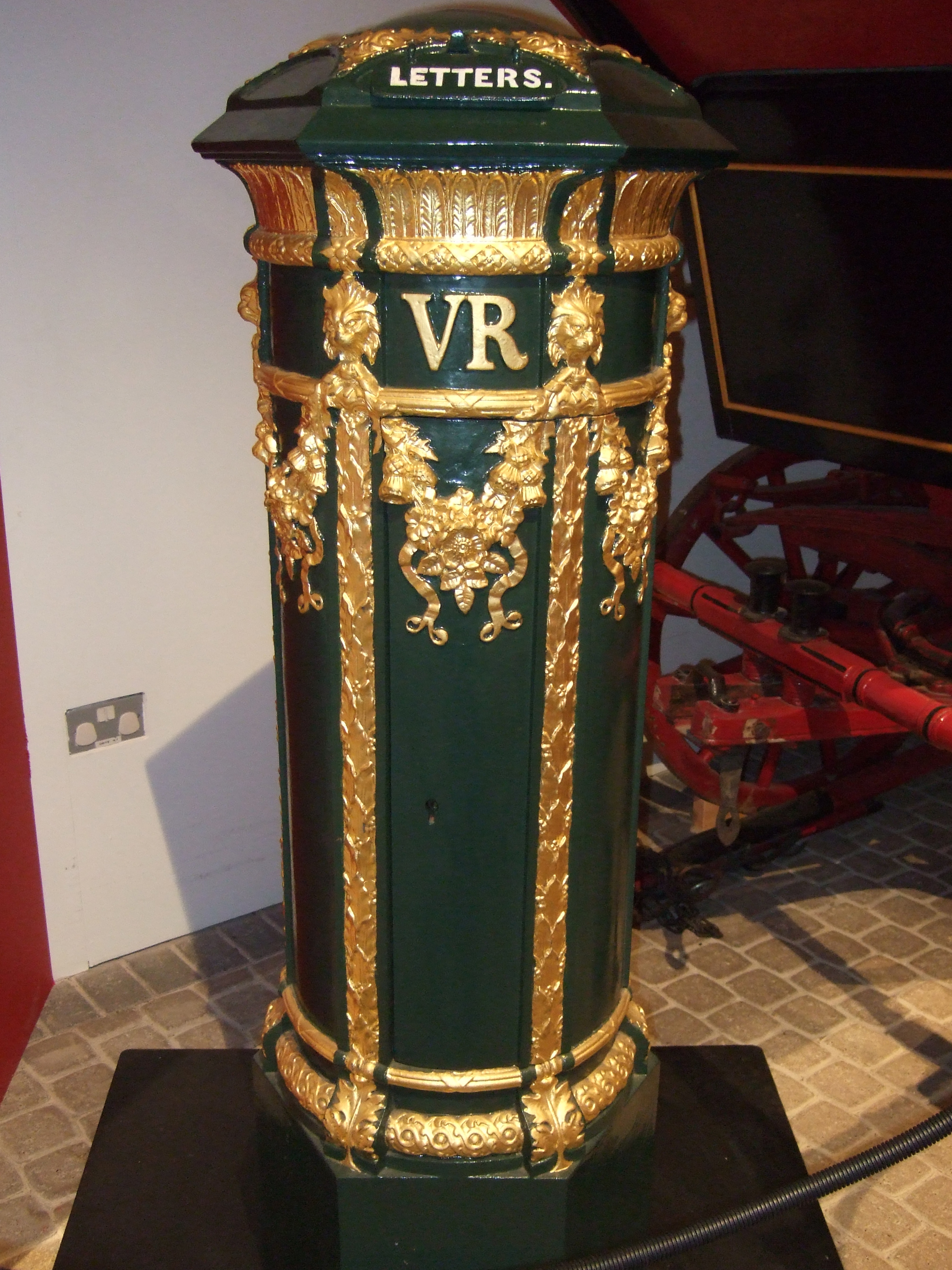
Pillar box dating from the reign of Queen Victoria

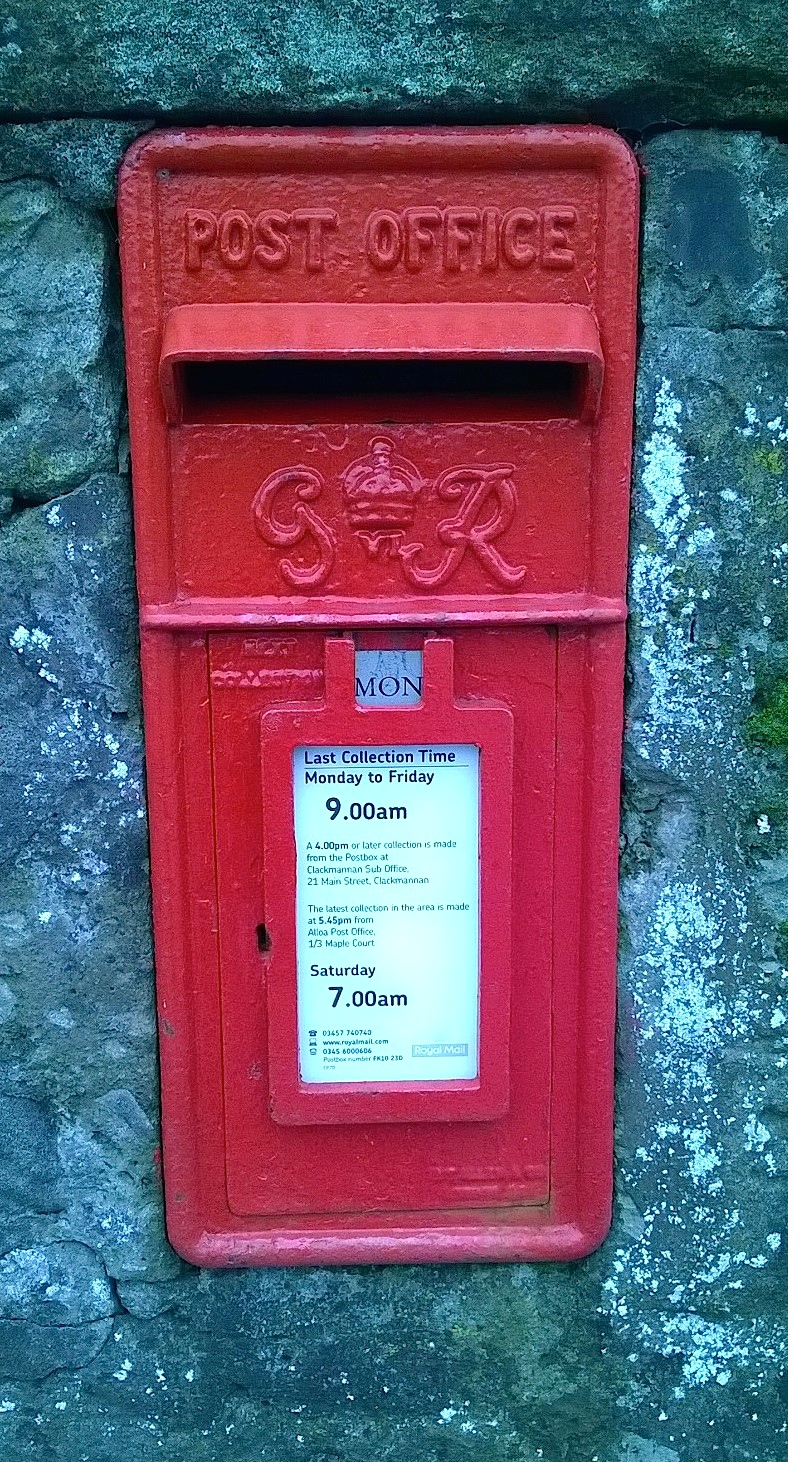
Royal Mail GR VI cast iron wall postbox in Clackmannan, Scotland still in use

The first Post Office pillar box was erected in 1852 in Jersey. Pillar boxes were introduced in mainland Britain the following year. British pillar boxes traditionally carry the Latin initials of the reigning monarch at the time of their installation, for example: VR for Victoria Regina or GR for Georgius Rex. Such branding was not used in Scotland for most of the reign of Queen Elizabeth II, due to a dispute over the monarch's title: some Scottish nationalists argue that Queen Elizabeth II should have simply been Queen Elizabeth, as there had been no previous Queen Elizabeth of Scotland or of the United Kingdom of Great Britain and Northern Ireland (Elizabeth I was only Queen of the pre-1707 Kingdom of England). The dispute involved vandalism and attacks on pillar and post boxes introduced in Scotland which displayed EIIR. To avoid the issue, pillar boxes in Scotland were either marked 'Post Office' or used the Scots Crown.

A national telephone service was opened by the Post Office in 1912. In 1919, the first international airmail service was developed by Royal Engineers (Postal Section) and Royal Air Force. The London Post Office Railway was opened in 1927.

In 1941, an airgraph service was introduced between Britain and Egypt. The service was later extended to Canada (1941), East Africa (1941), Burma (1942), India (1942), South Africa (1942), Australia (1943), New Zealand (1943), Ceylon (now Sri Lanka) (1944), and Italy (1944).

Postcodes were extended across Great Britain and Northern Ireland between 1959 and 1974. The two-class postal system was introduced in 1968, using first-class and second-class services. The Post Office opened the National Giro Bank that year.

In April 2025, Royal Mail announced that they were trialling two versions of a new solar-powered "postbox of the future" with a barcode reader and an electronically unlockable hatch to accept small parcels. By August, they decided to deploy 3500 of the red-topped version around the United Kingdom.

=== Statutory corporation ===
Under the Post Office Act 1969 the General Post Office was changed from a government department to a statutory corporation, known simply as the Post Office. The office of Postmaster General was abolished and replaced with the positions of chairman and chief executive in the new company. In 1971, postal services in Great Britain were suspended for two months between January and March as the result of a national postal strike over a pay claim.

British Telecom was separated from the Post Office in 1980, and emerged as an independent business in 1981. In 1986 the Post Office was subdivided into four businesses: Royal Mail Letters, Royal Mail Parcels, Post Office Counters and the National Girobank. Girobank was sold to Alliance & Leicester in 1990, but the remaining business continued under public ownership as privatisation of this was deemed to be too unpopular. That same year, Royal Mail Parcels was rebranded as Parcelforce as part of an attempt to compete with international courier firms, which were fast expanding into the European market.

Postal workers held their first national strike for 17 years in 1988, after walking out over bonuses being paid to recruit new workers in London and the South East. Royal Mail established Romec (Royal Mail Engineering & Construction) in 1989 to deliver facilities maintenance services to its business. Romec was 51% owned by Royal Mail, and 49% by Haden Building Management Ltd, which became Balfour Beatty WorkPlace and is now Cofely UK, part of GDF Suez in a joint venture.

In the 1990s the President of the Board of Trade, Michael Heseltine, began to look again at privatisation, and eventually a Green Paper on Postal Reform was published in May 1994, outlining various possible options. The ideas, however, proved controversial, and were dropped from the 1994 Queen's Speech after a number of Conservative MPs warned Heseltine that they would not vote for the legislation.

In 1998, Royal Mail launched RelayOne as an email to postal service system. In 1999, Royal Mail launched a short-lived e-commerce venture, ViaCode Limited, aimed at providing encrypted online communications services. However, it failed to make a profit and closed in 2002.

In 1999 Royal Mail acquired German Parcel, incorporating it into a newly formed holding company, General Logistics Systems B.V., which over the next few years was used to establish an international network of parcel couriers ('through acquisitions and the founding of companies in numerous countries'). In 2002 the GLS brand was launched, which later went on to function as Royal Mail's European parcels business.

==== Headquarters ====
The Post Office had its headquarters in St. Martin's Le Grand, in the City of London, until 1984. Then the headquarters division moved out to 33 Grosvenor Place (lately vacated by British Steel). After 1986 separate headquarters were established elsewhere for each of the three subdivisions of the Post Office, leaving a much reduced corporate head office (with just thirty staff) who in 1990 moved to 30 St James's Square; two years later it was again moved, to be co-located with the Letters head office in Royal Mail House (148 Old Street).

=== Public limited company ===
Following a change of government in 1997, New Labour decided to keep the Post Office state-owned, but with more commercial freedom. This led to the Postal Services Act 2000, whereby the Post Office became a public limited company in which the Secretary of State for Trade and Industry owned a special share, and the Treasury Solicitor held an ordinary share. As part of the 2000 Act, the government set up a postal regulator, the Postal Services Commission, known as Postcomm, which offered licences to private companies to deliver mail. In 2001, the Consumer Council for Postal Services, known as Postwatch, was created for consumers to express any concerns they may have with the postal service in Britain.

==== Consignia plc ====
The company was renamed Consignia in 2001, a name that was invented by the consultancy company Dragon Brands, and the new name was intended to show that the company did more than deliver mail; however, the change was very unpopular with both the general public and employees. The Communication Workers Union (CWU) boycotted the name, and the following year, it was announced that the company would be renamed Royal Mail Group plc. In 2002 Consignia discussed a potential merger with Dutch postal operator TPG, but the plans did not proceed after the two companies failed to agree terms.

==== Royal Mail Group plc ====
The company began operating under its 'new' name, Royal Mail Group plc, on 4 November 2002. Use of the Post Office brand was afterwards restricted to the counters business ('Post Office Counters Ltd' since 1987), which was duly renamed Post Office Limited; it continued to operate as a wholly owned subsidiary of Royal Mail Group plc until 2012, when the two were separated in preparation for the latter's privatisation.

In 2004, the second daily delivery was scrapped in an effort to reduce costs and improve efficiency, meaning a later single delivery would be made. The same year, the travelling post office mail trains were also axed. In 2005, Royal Mail signed a contract with GB Railfreight to operate an overnight rail service between London and Scotland (carrying bulk mail, and without any on-train sorting); this was later followed by a London-Newcastle service.

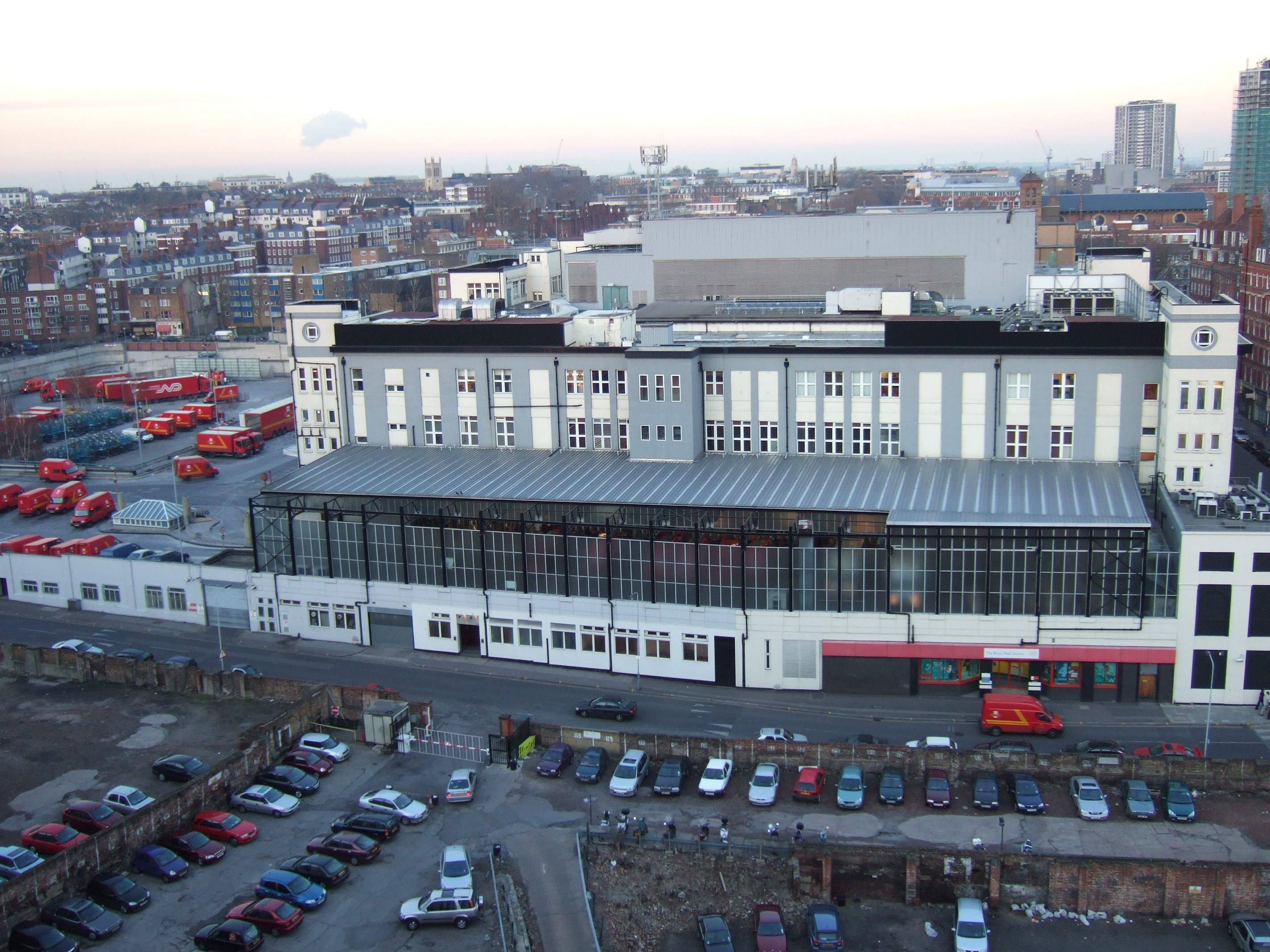
London's largest sorting office, Mount Pleasant

On 1 January 2006, the Royal Mail lost its 350-year monopoly, and the British postal market became fully open to competition. Competitors were allowed to collect and sort mail, and pass it to Royal Mail for delivery, a service known as downstream access. Royal Mail introduced Pricing in Proportion (PiP) for first and second class inland mail, whereby prices are affected by the size as well as weight of items. It also introduced an online postage service, allowing customers to pay for postage online.

==== Royal Mail Group Ltd ====
In 2007, the Royal Mail Group plc became Royal Mail Group Ltd, in a slight change of legal status. Royal Mail ended Sunday collections from pillar boxes that year.

On 1 October 2008, Postwatch was merged into the new consumer watchdog Consumer Focus.

In 2008, due to a continuing fall in mail volumes, the government commissioned an independent review of the postal services sector by Richard Hooper CBE, the former deputy chairman of Ofcom. The recommendations in the Hooper Review led Business Secretary Peter Mandelson to seek to part privatise the company by selling a minority stake to a commercial partner. However, despite legislation for the sale passing the House of Lords, it was abandoned in the House of Commons after strong opposition from backbench Labour MPs. The government later cited the difficult economic conditions for the reason behind the retreat.

Following the departure of Adam Crozier to ITV plc on 27 May 2010, Royal Mail appointed Canadian Moya Greene as chief executive, the first woman to hold the post.

On 6 December 2010, a number of paid-for services including Admail, post office boxes and private post boxes were removed from the Inland Letter Post Scheme (ILPS) and became available under contract. Several free services, including petitions to parliament and the sovereign, and poste restante, were removed from the scheme.

A Royal Mail Peugeot e-Partner van, seen in Rivendell in 2025

=== Privatisation ===
Following the 2010 general election, the new Business Secretary in the coalition government, Vince Cable, asked Richard Hooper CBE to expand on his previous report, to take into account EU Directive 2008/6/EC which called for the postal sector to be fully open to competition by 31 December 2012. Based on the updated Hooper Review, Parliament passed the Postal Services Act 2011. The act allowed for up to 90% of Royal Mail to be privatised, with at least 10% of shares to be held by Royal Mail employees.

As part of the 2011 Act, Postcomm was merged into the communications regulator Ofcom on 1 October 2011, with Ofcom introducing a new simplified set of regulations for postal services on 27 March 2012. On 31 March 2012, the government took over the historic assets and liabilities of the Royal Mail pension scheme, relieving Royal Mail of its huge pensions deficit. On 1 April 2012, Post Office Limited became independent of Royal Mail Group, and was reorganised to become a subsidiary of Royal Mail Holdings, with a separate management and board of directors. A 10-year inter-business agreement was signed between the two companies to allow Post Offices to continue issuing stamps and handling letters and parcels for Royal Mail. The act also contained the option for Post Office Ltd to become a mutual organisation in the future.

In July 2013, Cable announced that Royal Mail was to be floated on the London Stock Exchange, and confirmed that postal staff would be entitled to free shares. A new holding company, Royal Mail plc, was established in September 2013, in anticipation of its initial public offering on the London Stock Exchange. Applications for members of the public to buy shares opened on 27 September 2013, ahead of the company's listing on the London Stock Exchange on 15 October 2013. Trading as Royal Mail, and continuing to serve as the UK's designated Universal Service Provider, the company operated through two divisions: UKPIL (UK Parcels, International & Letters) 'Royal Mail's core UK and international parcels and letter delivery businesses under the Royal Mail and Parcelforce Worldwide brands' and GLS (General Logistics Systems) 'the Group's European parcels business'; (between 2016 and 2020, GLS would expand beyond Europe and into North America). Throughout this time, Royal Mail Group Limited continued to operate as a 'wholly owned subsidiary of Royal Mail plc', running the UKPIL side of the operation.

At its annual general meeting on 20 July 2022, the company announced that the holding company responsible for both Royal Mail and GLS would change its name to International Distributions Services (IDS) plc. It was also suggested that the board of directors might look to separate GLS in order to distance the profitable company from Royal Mail, which was in negotiations with the CWU over both pay and future changes to ways of working. The name change was filled in the Companies House on 28 September 2022 and registered on 3 October. In March 2023, talks over pay were reportedly collapsing.

=== Ownership under EP Group ===
In December 2024, the British government approved the £3.6 billion sale of IDS to Daniel Křetínský's EP Group, marking the first time the 508-year-old postal service had come under foreign ownership. The deal, reviewed under national security laws, included commitments to retain the universal service obligation, UK headquarters, and tax residency, while barring dividends unless financial and service targets were met. Despite concerns over declining letter volumes and scrutiny of Křetínský's Russian business ties, the agreement, supported by unions, aimed to stabilise and reform Royal Mail. The acquisition was completed in April 2025.

Royal Mail Group Ltd continues to function as a wholly owned subsidiary: "The Company makes up a significant part of the Royal Mail UK segment ('Royal Mail') within the IDS plc Group", running parcels and letter delivery businesses under the Royal Mail and Parcelforce Worldwide brands.

== Services ==
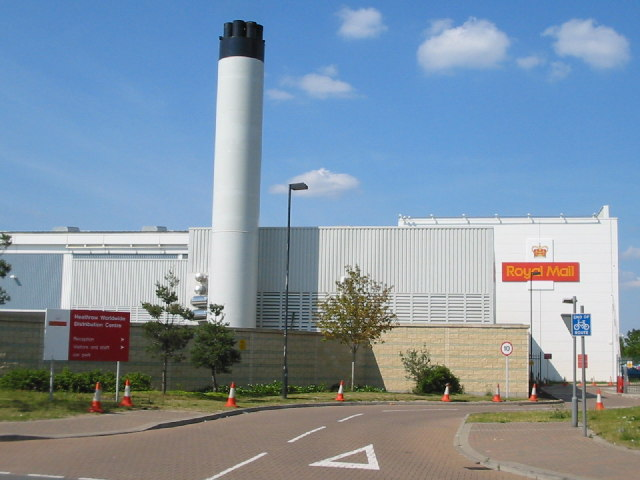
Heathrow Worldwide Distribution Centre, where mail entering and leaving the United Kingdom is sorted

=== Universal service ===
Royal Mail is required by law to maintain the universal service, whereby items of a specific size can be sent to any location within the United Kingdom for a fixed price, not affected by distance. The Postal Services Act 2011 guaranteed that Royal Mail would continue to provide the universal service until at least 2021.

On 20 January 2025, Royal Mail announced that it expected to be permitted to discontinue Saturday deliveries for second-class letters under proposals put forward by Ofcom. The plans also included a reduction in postal delivery targets.The postal and communications regulator has proposed that second-class letter deliveries operate on alternate weekdays, while maintaining first-class letter deliveries six days a week.

=== Special Delivery ===
Royal Mail Special Delivery is an expedited mail service that guarantees delivery by 1 p.m. or 9 a.m. the next day for an increased cost. In the event that the item does not arrive on time, there is a money back guarantee. It insures goods to the value of £50 for 9 a.m. or £750 for 1 p.m. An extra fee can be paid to extend the insurance coverage to up to £2,500 (for either service). Exceptions to the delivery guarantee exist for certain postcodes.

=== Business services ===
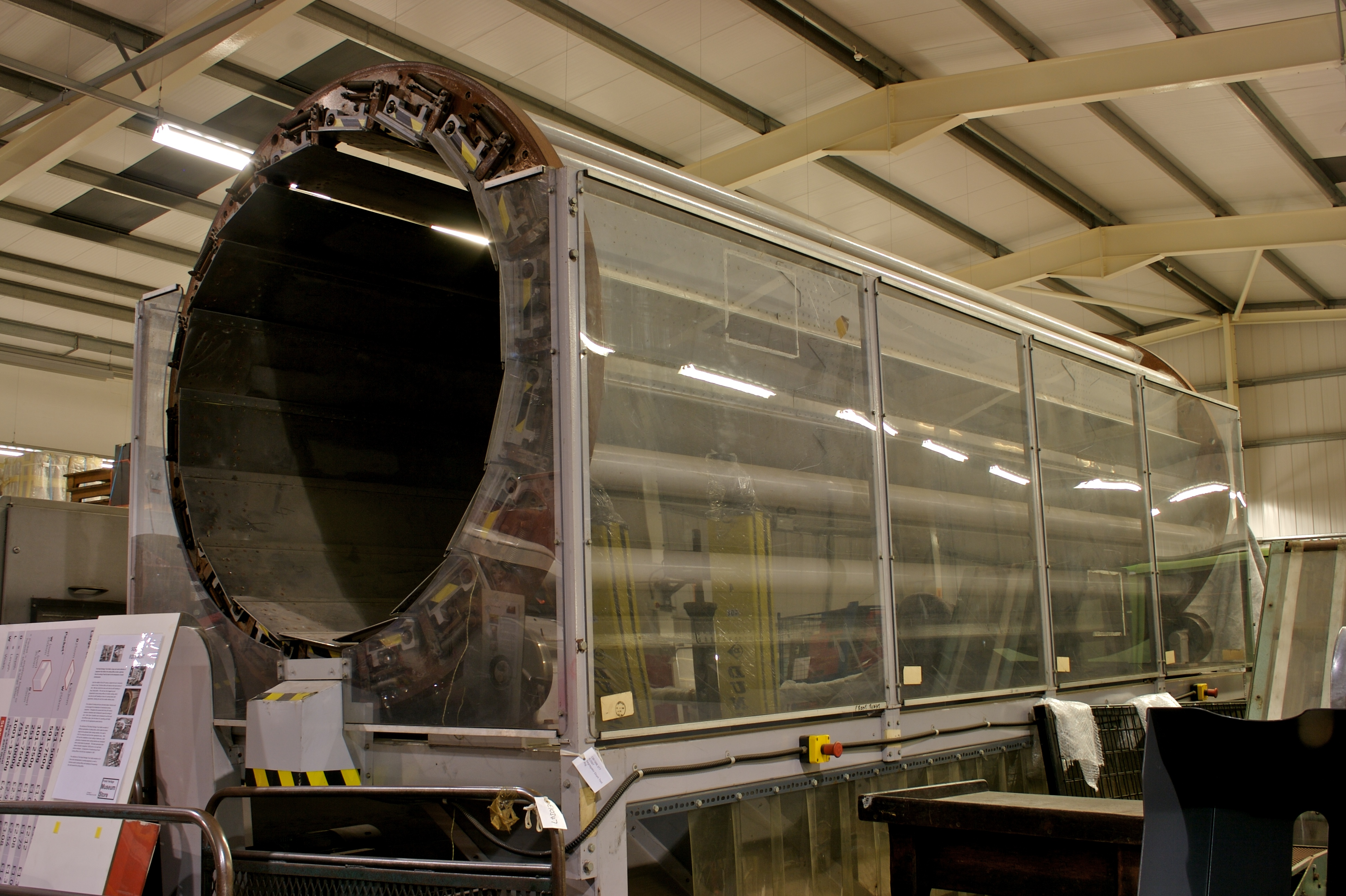
Automated post sorting machine

The Royal Mail runs, alongside its stamped mail services, another sector of post called business mail. The large majority of Royal Mail's business mail service is for PPI or franked mail, where the sender prints their own 'stamp'. For PPI mail, this involves either a simple rubber stamp and an ink pad, or a printed label. For franked mail, a dedicated franking machine is used.

Bulk business mail, using Mailmark technology, attracts reduced prices of up to 32%, if the sender prints an RM4SCC barcode, or prints the address formatted in a specific way in a font readable by RM optical character recognition (OCR) equipment.

=== Prohibited goods ===
Royal Mail will not carry a number of items which it says could be dangerous for its staff or vehicles. Additionally, a list of 'restricted' items can be posted subject to conditions. Prohibited goods include alcoholic, corrosive or flammable liquids or solids, gases, controlled drugs, indecent or offensive materials, and human and animal remains.

In 2004, Royal Mail applied to the then postal regulator Postcomm to ban the carriage of sporting firearms, saying they caused disruption to the network, that a ban would assist police with firearms control, and that ease of access meant the letters network was a target of criminals. Postcomm issued a consultation on the proposed changes in December 2004, to which 62 people and organisations responded.

In June 2005, Postcomm decided to refuse the application on the grounds that Royal Mail had not provided sufficient evidence that carrying firearms caused undue disruption or that a ban would reduce the number of illegal weapons. It also said that a ban would cause unnecessary hardship to individuals and businesses.

In August 2012, Royal Mail again attempted to prohibit the carriage of all firearms, air rifles and air pistols from 30 November 2012. It cited section 14(1) of the Firearms (Amendment) Act 1988 (c. 45), which requires carriers of firearms to "take reasonable precautions" for their safe custody and argued that to comply would involve disproportionate cost. A Royal Mail public consultation document on the changes said: "We expect the impact on customers to be minimal".

The proposals provoked a large negative response, following a campaign led by the British Association for Shooting and Conservation, backed by numerous shooting-related websites and organisations. A total of 1,458 people gave their views in emails and letters sent to Royal Mail. An online petition opposing the proposals was signed by 2,236 people, 1,742 of whom added comments. In the face of such opposition, Royal Mail dropped the proposals in December 2012.

=== Unaddressed promotional mail delivery ===
Royal Mail's "Door to door" service provides delivery of leaflets, brochures, catalogues and other print materials to groups of domestic and business addresses selected by postcode. Such deliveries are made by the mail carrier together as part of the daily round. Companies using the "Door to door" service include Virgin Media, BT, Sky, Talk Talk, Farmfoods, Domino's Pizza, Direct Line and Morrisons. In 2005, the service delivered 3.3 billion items.

The "Door to door" service does not use the UK Mailing Preference Service; instead, Royal Mail operates its own opt-out database. Warnings about missing government communications given by Royal Mail to customers opting out of their service have been criticised by customers and consumer groups. Clarification given by the company in June 2015 explained that election communications and unaddressed government mail would be delivered to customers even if they had opted out.

== Staffing ==
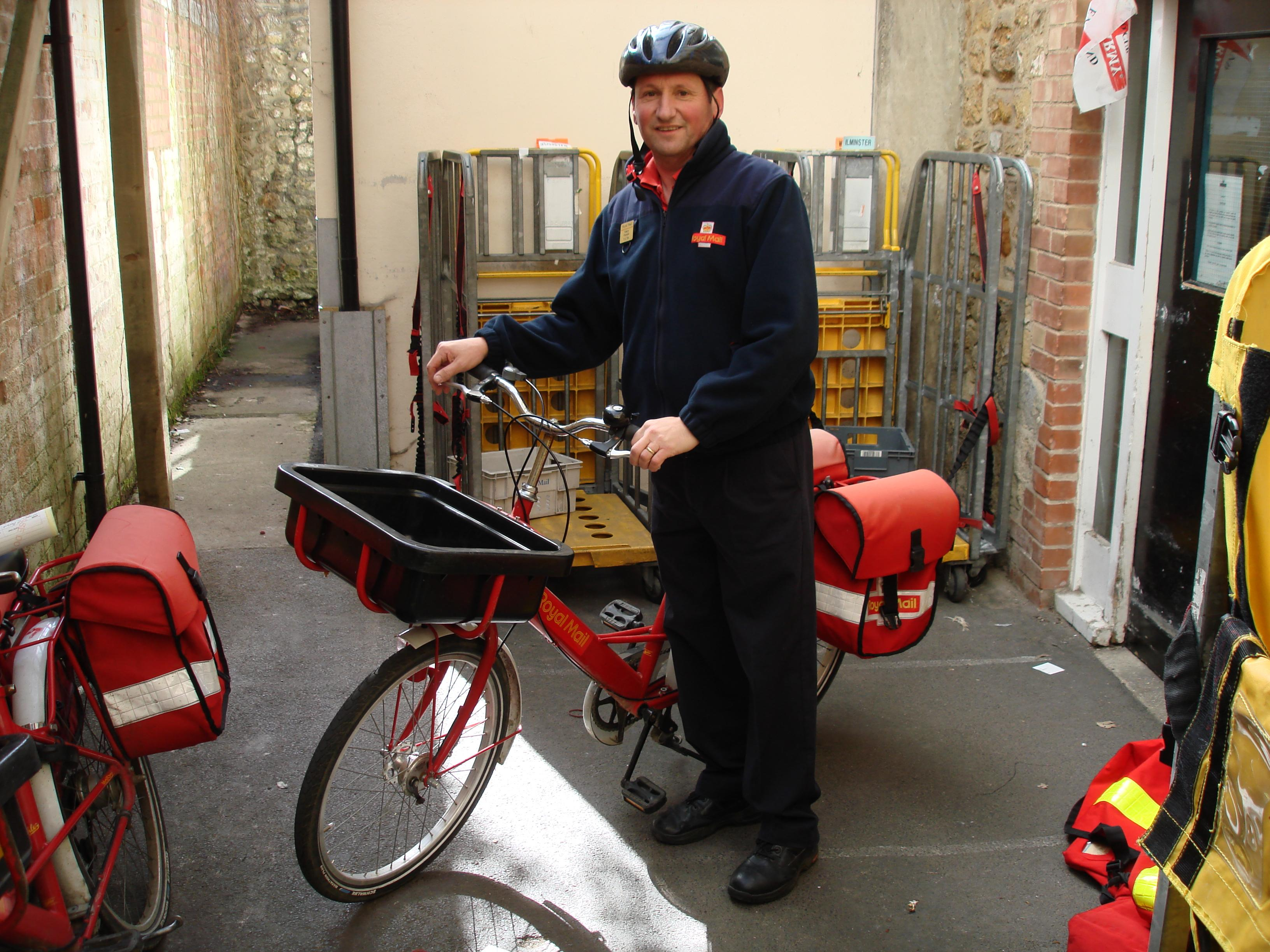
Royal Mail postman with bicycle

As of 2019, Royal Mail employed around 162,000 permanent postal workers, of which 143,000 were UK-based roles, and 90,000 were postmen and women. An additional 18,000 casual workers were employed during November and December to assist with the additional Christmas post.

In 2011, Royal Mail established an in-house agency, Angard Staffing Solutions, to recruit temporary workers. Royal Mail was accused of trying to circumvent the Agency Workers Regulations, but denied this, saying they only wanted to reduce recruitment costs. In January 2012 it was reported that Angard had failed to pay a number of workers for several weeks.

Royal Mail's industrial disputes include a seven-week strike in 1971 after a dispute over pay and another strike in 1988 due to bonuses being paid to new staff recruited in London and the South East.

Royal Mail suffered national wildcat strikes over pay and conditions in 2003. In Autumn 2007, disputes over modernisation began to escalate into industrial action. In mid October the CWU and Royal Mail agreed a resolution to the dispute.

In December 2008, workers at mail centres affected by proposals to rationalise the number of mail centres (particularly in north west England) again voted for strike action, potentially affecting Christmas deliveries. The action was postponed less than 24 hours before staff were due to walk out.

Localised strikes took place across the UK from June 2009 and grew in frequency throughout the summer. In September 2009 the CWU opened a national ballot for industrial action over Royal Mail's failure to reach a national agreement covering protection of jobs, pay, terms and conditions and the cessation of managerial executive action. The ballot was passed in October, causing a number of two- and three-day strikes.

There were several strikes in 2022. They ended in July 2023 after workers agreed to a three-year pay deal. Seventy-six per cent of union members voted in favour of the agreement, which included a ten per cent salary increase and a one-off lump sum of five-hundred pounds, in a ballot with a sixty-seven per cent turnout.

Royal Mail Group have lost 59 employment tribunals since 2017

On 28 December 2024, the UK's longest serving postman, Robert Hudson, retired at the age of 76, after 60 years' service.

=== Penny Post Credit Union ===
Penny Post Credit Union Limited is a savings and loans co-operative established by a joint project with the CWU in 1996, as Royal Mail Wolverhampton and District Employees Credit Union, it became Royal Mail (West) Credit Union in 2000, before adopting the present name in 2001. Based at the North West Midlands Mail Centre, it is a member of the Association of British Credit Unions Limited.

The credit union is authorised by the Prudential Regulation Authority and regulated by the Financial Conduct Authority and the PRA. Ultimately, like the banks and building societies, members' savings are protected against business failure by the Financial Services Compensation Scheme.

=== Senior leadership ===
- Chairman: Daniel Křetínský (since June 2025)
- Chief executive (interim): Alistair Cochrane (since June 2025)

==== Former chairmen ====
The position of chairman was established in 1969, after enactment of the Post Office Act 1969. Prior to this, the chairman's duties were performed by the Postmaster General of the United Kingdom.

- William Hall, 2nd Viscount Hall (1969–1970)
- Sir William Ryland (1971–1977)
- Sir William Barlow (1977–1980)
- Sir Ron Dearing (1980–1987)
- Sir Bryan Nicholson (1987–1992)
- Sir Michael Heron (1993–1998)
- Neville Bain (1998–2002)
- Allan Leighton (2002–2008)
- Sir Donald Brydon (2009–2015)
- Peter Long (2015–2018)
- Les Owen (2018–2019)
- Keith Williams (2019–2025)

==== Former chief executives ====
The position of chief executive was established in 1969, after enactment of the Post Office Act 1969. Prior to this, the chief executive's duties were performed by the Postmaster General of the United Kingdom.

- Sir William Ryland (1969–1977)
- Sir William Barlow (1977–1980)
- Sir Ron Dearing (1980–1987)
- Sir Bryan Nicholson (1987–1992)
- Bill Cockburn (1992–1995)
- John Roberts (1995–2003)
- Adam Crozier (2003–2010)
- Dame Moya Greene (2010–2018)
- Rico Back (2018–2020)
- Stuart Simpson (2020–2021) (interim)
- Simon Thompson (2021–2023)
- Martin Seidenberg (2023–2024) (interim)
- Emma Gilthorpe (2024–2025)

== Regulation ==
Royal Mail is currently regulated by Ofcom, while consumer interests are represented by Citizens Advice. The Postal Services Act 2000 had set up Postcomm to regulate postal services, and Postwatch to represent consumer interests. The relationship between Postcomm and Postwatch was not always good, and in 2005, Postwatch took Postcomm to judicial review over its decision regarding rebates to late-paying customers. Postwatch merged with Energywatch in 2008 to form Consumer Focus, while Postcomm was merged into Ofcom under the Postal Services Act 2011. Consumer Focus later became Consumer Futures before being merged into the Citizens Advice Bureau in 2014.

Royal Mail has, in some quarters, a poor reputation for losing mail despite its claims that more than 99.93% of mail arrives safely and in 2006 was fined £11.7 million due to the amount of mail lost, stolen or damaged. In the first three months of 2011, around 120,000 letters were lost.

In July 2012 Ofcom consulted on a scheme proposed by Royal Mail to alter its delivery obligations to allow larger postal items to be left with neighbours rather than returning them to a Royal Mail office to await collection. The scheme was presented as offering consumers greater choice for receiving mail when not at home, that is if Royal Mail deliver items as per their stated contractual obligations and was said to follow Royal Mail research from a 'delivery to neighbour' trial across six areas of the UK that showed widespread consumer satisfaction. In a statement dated 27 September 2012, Ofcom announced it would approve the scheme after noting that more goods were being purchased over the internet and that Royal Mail's competitors were permitted to leave undelivered items with neighbours. People who do not wish to have parcels left with neighbours, or to receive those of others, can opt out by displaying a free opt-out sticker near their letterbox. Royal Mail remains liable for undeliverable items until they are received by the addressee or returned to sender.

Ofcom suggested in October 2012 that the first and second class post systems could be replaced by a single class. The new class would be set at a higher price than the current second class, but would be delivered in a shorter time-frame.

Royal Mail was fined £50 million by Ofcom in 2018 for breach of European Union competition law. Ofcom found that Royal Mail had abused its dominant position in 2014 in the delivery of letters.

As of December 2023, Royal Mail has been fined a total of £58,303,936 for regulatory breaches according to the Violation Tracker UK website.

== Operations ==
The targets are delivering 93% of First Class post the next working day, and delivering 98.5% of Second Class post within three working days.

=== Mail centres ===
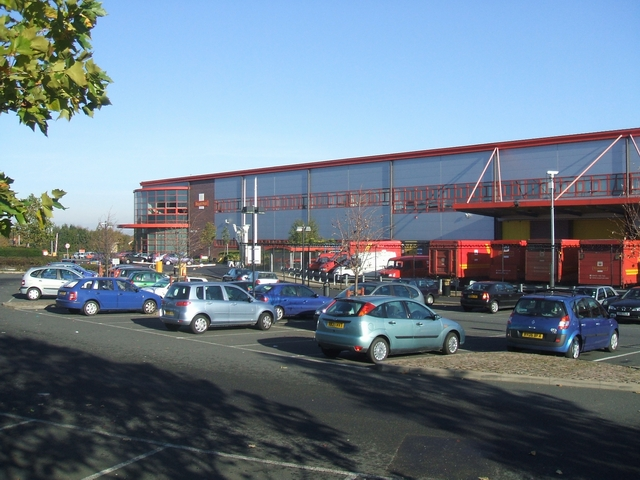
North West Midlands Mail Centre, Wolverhampton

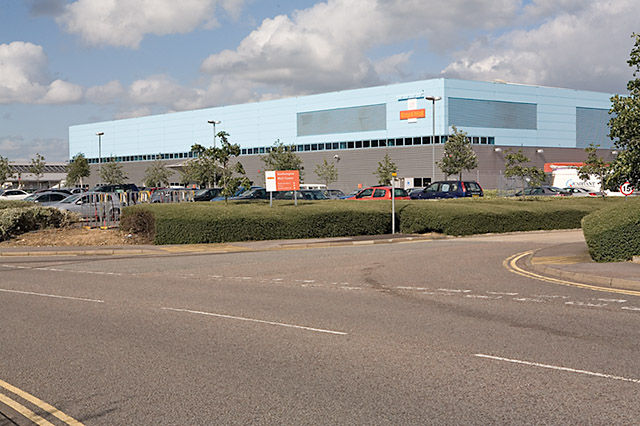
Southampton Mail Centre

Royal Mail operates a network of 37 mail centres (as of 2019). Each mail centre serves a large geographically defined area of the UK and together they form the backbone network of the mail distribution operation. Mail is collected and brought to one of the mail centres. Mail is exchanged between the mail centres and then forwarded to one of 1,356 delivery offices, from where the final delivery is made.

Mail from third-party "downstream access" providers is also brought to the mail centres for Royal Mail to carry out the final delivery. Ofcom restricts the prices at which Royal Mail sell this downstream access to third-party companies.

As part of the sorting process, mail is collected from pillar boxes, Post Office branches and businesses, and brought to the regional mail centre. The process is divided into two parts. The 'outward' sorting identifies mail for delivery in the mail centre geographic area, which is retained, and mail intended for other mail centres, which is dispatched. The 'inward' sorting forwards mail received from other centres to the relevant delivery offices within the mail centre area.

==== Integrated mail processing ====
Integrated mail processing (IMP) is the method that Royal Mail uses to sort the mail (in bulk) before delivery and has been implementing the technology since 1999. The system works by automated optical character recognition of postcodes. Integrated mail processors scan the front and back of an envelope and translate addresses into machine-readable code. Letters are given a fluorescent orange barcode that represents the address. The barcode follows the RM4SCC pattern. Per mail item there are over 250 types of information that are collected from mail class to indicia type. Some scanning and detection features have been removed as they have been superseded by newer technology. This is known as the IMP Extension of Life (EoL) program.

==== Intelligent letter sorting machines ====
Royal Mail operates 66 intelligent letter sorting machines (ILSMs) in the UK, which were installed in the mid-1980s and early 1990s to improve the speed and efficiency of sorting and delivering mail. These process more than 36,000 items per hour and were part of their ongoing modernisation programme that commenced in the early 1980s.

==== International mail ====
Royal Mail operates an international-mail sorting centre, in Langley, Berkshire close to Heathrow Airport, called the Heathrow Worldwide Distribution Centre, which handles all international airmail arriving into and leaving the United Kingdom, plus some container- and road-transported mail.

==== List of mail centres ====
As of March 2021, the [38] operational mail centres (divided into Royal Mail regions) were:

- East [7]: Chelmsford, Norwich, Nottingham, Peterborough, Romford, Sheffield, South Midlands (Northampton)
- West [6]: Birmingham, Chester, Manchester, North West Midlands (Wolverhampton), Preston, Warrington
- South East [7]: Croydon, Gatwick (Crawley), Greenford, Home Counties North (Hemel Hempstead), Jubilee (Hounslow), Medway (Rochester), London Central (Mount Pleasant)
- South West [10]: Bristol, Cardiff, Dorset (Poole), Exeter, Plymouth, Portsmouth, Southampton, Swansea, Thames Valley (Swindon), Truro
- North [8]: Aberdeen, Inverness, Carlisle, Edinburgh, Glasgow, Leeds, Northern Ireland (Newtownabbey), Tyneside/Newcastle (Gateshead)

==== Closures ====
The number of mail centres has been declining as part of the Mail Centre Rationalisation Programme. In 2008, there were 69 mail centres and in 2010 there were 64. It was anticipated that around half of these could be closed by 2016. Oldham and Stockport along with Oxford and Reading mail centres all closed in 2009 and Bolton, Crewe, Liverpool, Northampton, Coventry and Milton Keynes were closed in 2010. Farnborough, Watford and Stevenage were closed in 2011. Hemel Hempstead, Southend, Worcester were closed in 2012. Dartford, Tonbridge, Maidstone and Canterbury were closed in 2012 but replaced by a new mail centre in Rochester. The East London and South London mail centres were closed during summer 2012.

In 2013 and 2014, a further eight mail centres were planned to be closed. The old mail centres in Northampton, Coventry and Milton Keynes were replaced with the new South Midlands mail centre in Northampton covering Warwickshire, Coventry, Northamptonshire and Milton Keynes. The South Midlands Mail Centre is the largest in the UK.

=== Regional Distribution Centres ===
As of 2020 there are seven Regional Distribution Centres (RDCs) across the country. They are responsible for handling large pre-sorted mailings from business customers.

- Scottish Distribution Centre (Wishaw)
- Princess Royal Distribution Centre (London)
- National Distribution Centre (Northampton)
- South West Distribution Centre (Bristol)
- North West Distribution Centre (Warrington)
- Yorkshire Distribution Centre (Normanton)
- Northern Ireland Distribution Centre (Newtownabbey)

=== Fleet ===
Royal Mail van with Charles III livery, 2025

Royal Mail is famous for its custom load-carrying bicycles (with the rack and basket built into the frame), made by Pashley Cycles since 1971. Since 2000, old delivery bicycles have been shipped to Africa by the charity Re~Cycle; over 8,000 had been donated by 2004. In 2009, Royal Mail announced it was beginning to phase out bicycle deliveries, to be replaced with more push-trolleys and vans. A spokesman said that they would continue to use bicycles on some rural routes, and that there was no plan to phase out bicycles completely.

In addition to running a large number of road vehicles, Royal Mail uses trains, a ship and some aircraft, with an air hub at East Midlands Airport. In June 2013, Royal Mail confirmed it would extend Titan Airways' contract to operate night flights from Stansted Airport, from January 2014 to January 2017, introducing new routes to Edinburgh and Belfast using three Boeing 737s. The new contract called for the replacement of the British Aerospace 146-200QC (Quick Change) aircraft in favour of a standard Boeing 737 fleet, and the type was withdrawn by Titan Airways in November 2013.

In 2021 Royal Mail announced plans to trial using a drone between the British mainland and St Mary's airport, Isles of Scilly. The twin-engine vehicle is manufactured in the UK by the Windracers and is capable of carrying 100 kg of mail, which is the same weight as a typical delivery round. It is able to fly in poor weather conditions, including fog, and will be out of sight of any operator during the 70-mile journey. Vertical take-off and landing drones will take parcels between the islands in the archipelago. Royal Mail delivered its first parcel using a drone in December 2020 when a package was sent to a remote lighthouse on Scotland's Isle of Mull. In Scotland, it partnered with Skyports for postal services using drones.

The RMS St. Helena was a cargo and passenger ship that served the British overseas territory of Saint Helena. It sailed between Cape Town, Saint Helena and Ascension Island. It was one of only two Royal Mail Ships in service, alongside the Queen Mary 2, although it did not belong to Royal Mail Group.

Royal Mail operated the London Post Office Railway, a network of driverless trains running on a private underground track, from 1927 until it closed it in 2003.

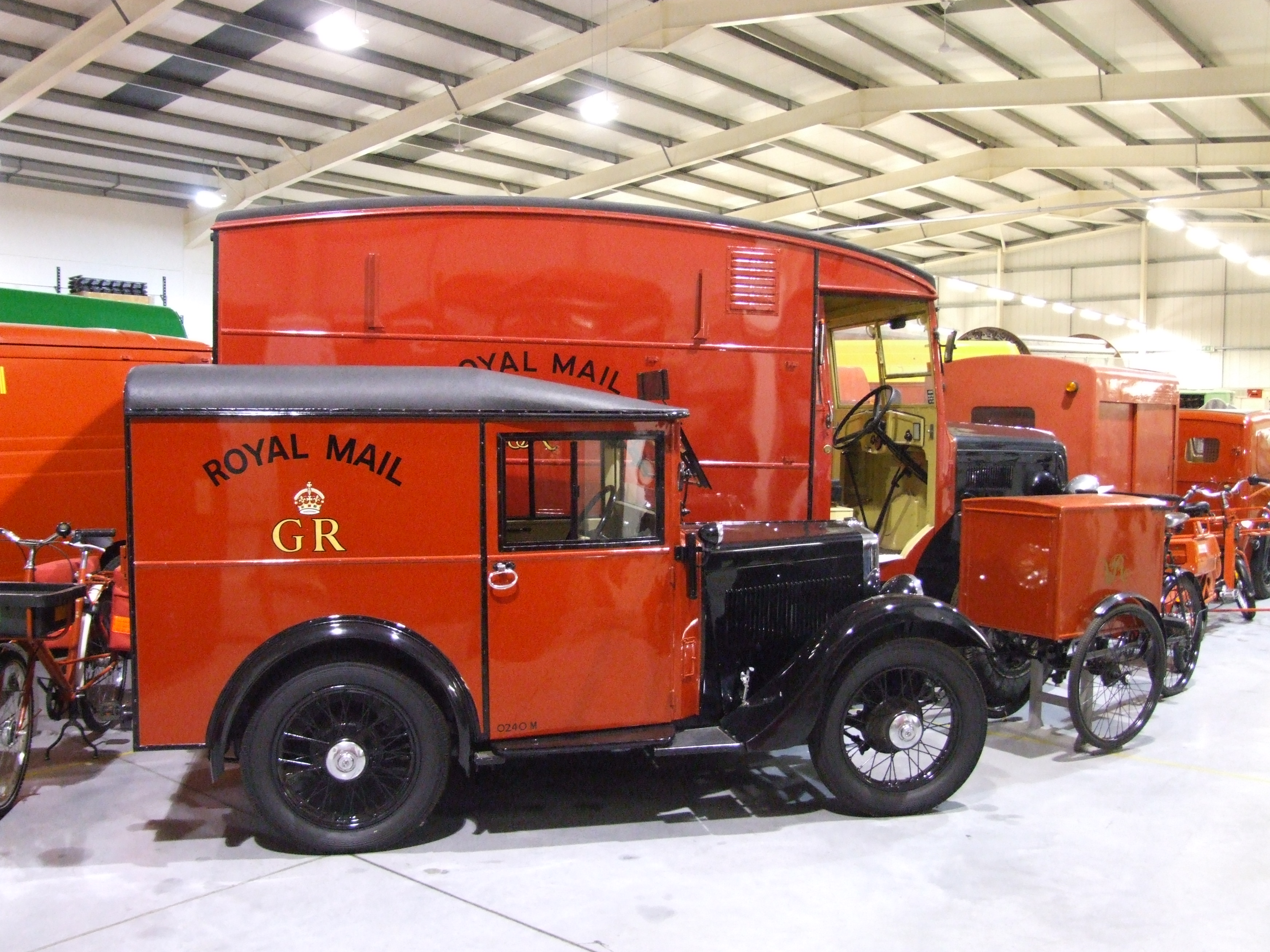
Historic vehicle fleet

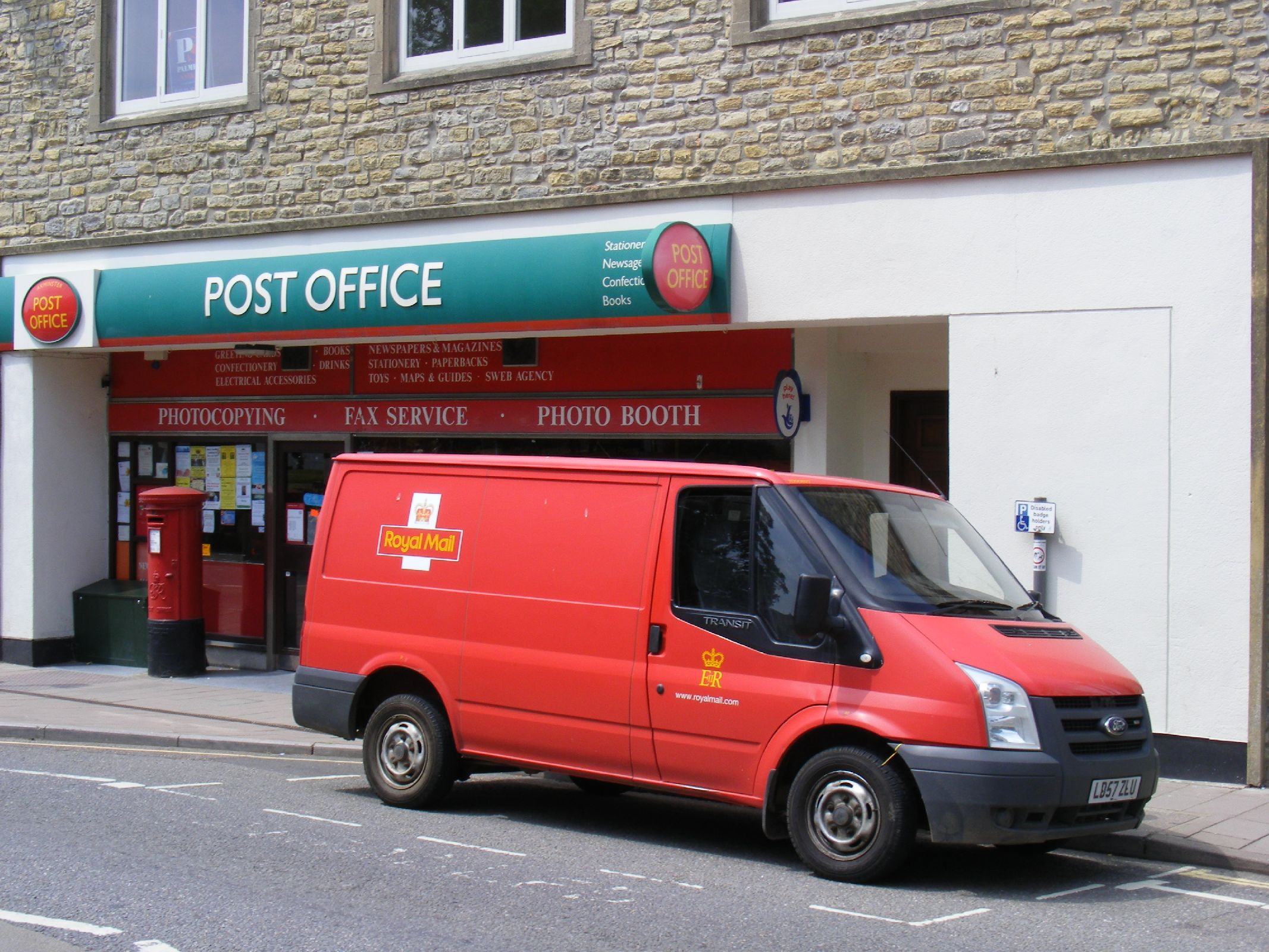
Royal Mail Ford Transit van outside the Axminster post office

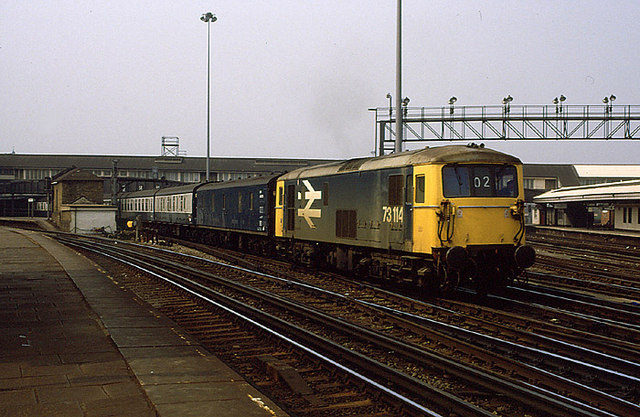
A British Rail Class 73 with a parcels van and carriages under British Rail carrying the mail in 1986 through Clapham Junction

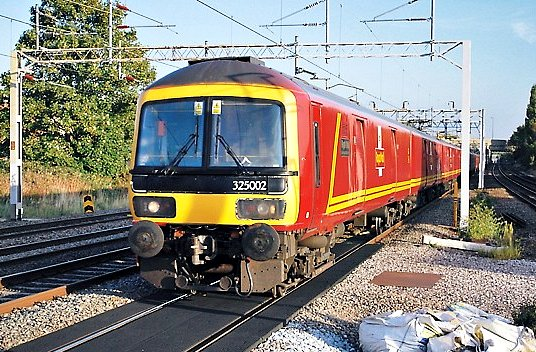
A British Rail Class 325 mail train

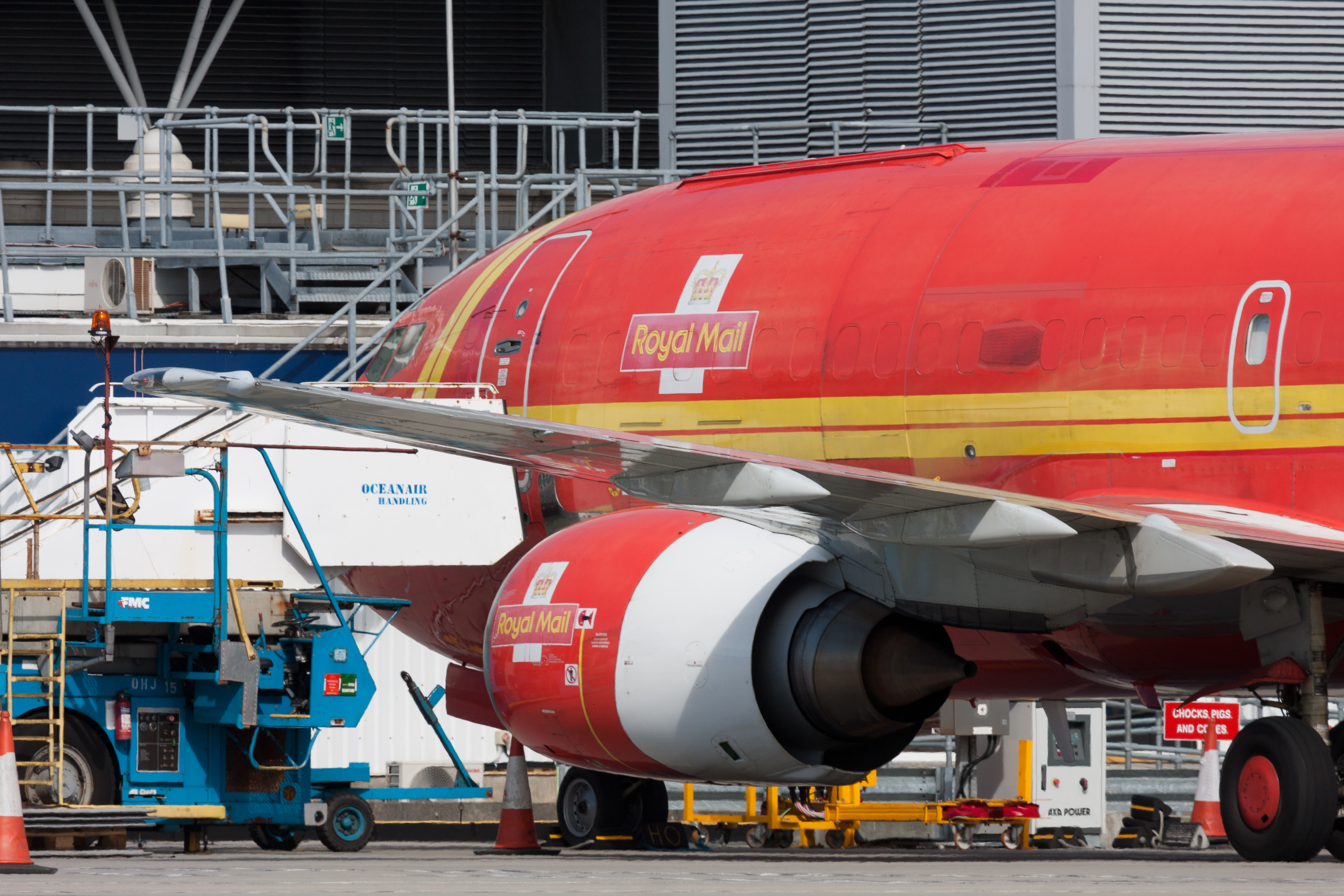
Boeing 737 in Royal Mail livery at Jersey Airport

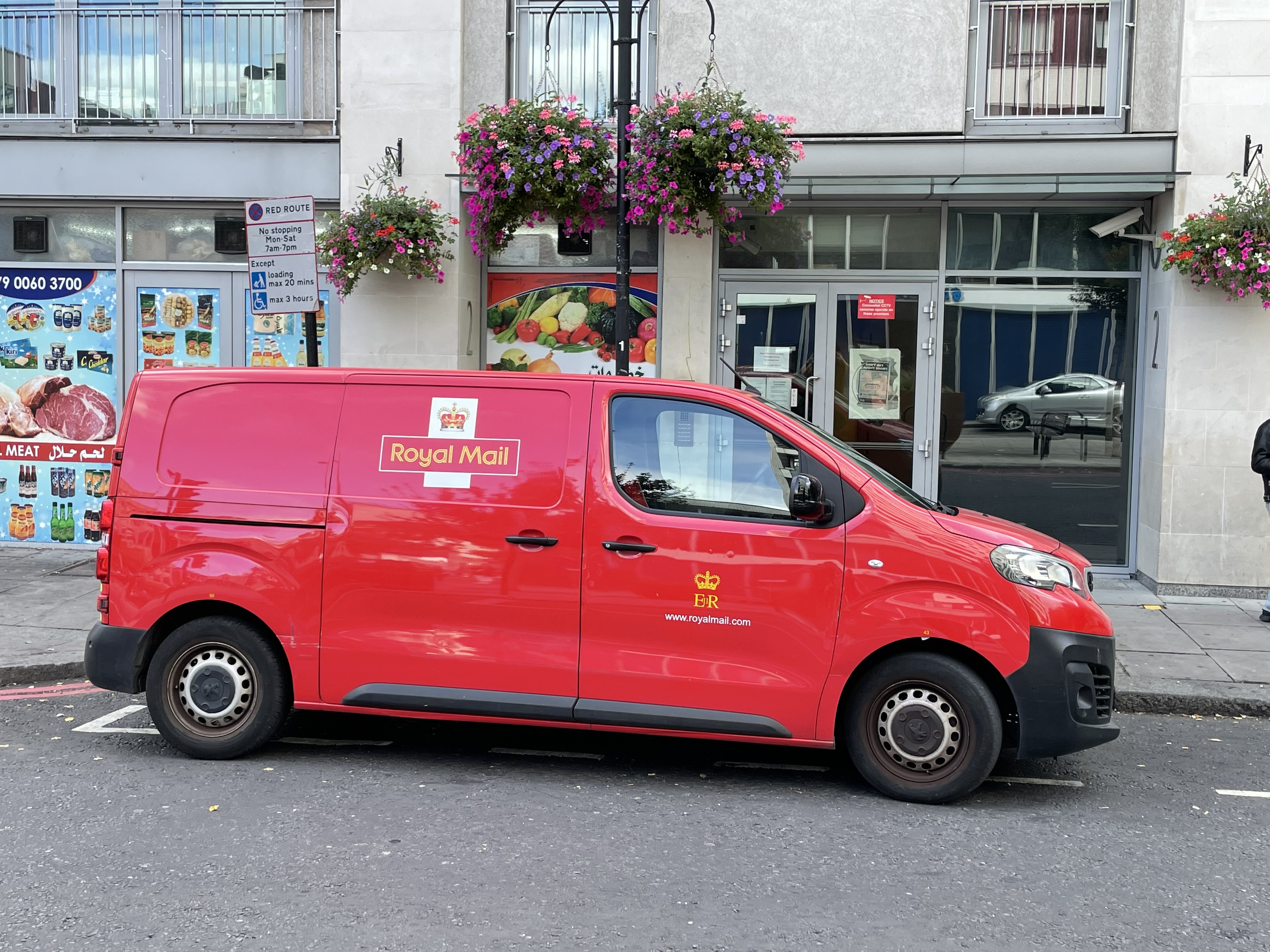
Royal Mail Peugeot Expert van in London with Elizabeth II livery, 2022

== British Overseas Territories and Crown Dependencies ==
British Overseas Territories and Crown Dependencies have their own independent postal systems. (See List of postal entities.) Though served by independent operators, the three Crown Dependencies use British postcodes in co-operation with Royal Mail; each dependency has its own postal area. The same prices are charged by the four operators for delivery throughout their collective area, though delivery times vary, and British mail to the Channel Islands must clear customs.

== Arms ==
Coat of arms of Royal Mail Group Limited
Adopted 1981 Crest A lion sejant grasping in its dexter forepaw a caduceus in pale, Gold. Escutcheon Gules, billetty bendwise Argent and in fess four bezants Supporters Upon a compartment of grass Vert bisected palewise by water barry wavy Argent and Azure are set for supporters on either side a pegasus Or crowned with an ancient crown and gorged with a collar Azure charged of four bezants. Motto CURA FIDE STUDIO

When the Post Office ceased to be a government department, it was given its own coat of arms (issued in 1970), which incorporated colours associated with the Royal Mail (red) and Post Office Telecommunications (yellow): the latter being represented in particular by a "barrulet wavy or" traversing both the red shield and the red collars (worn by the pegasus supporters). A phoenix crest alluded to the new corporation having been born out of its predecessor (the GPO); the caduceus in its beak stood for swift communications.

Just over ten years later, after British Telecom was separated from the Post Office, a new grant of arms was made: the telecommunications references were removed from the blazon, with the "barrulet wavy" being replaced by gold bezants (to represent the Girobank, whose colour (blue) was also introduced). The phoenix was also replaced, by a lion.

These arms were registered as a trademark in 1986, and are currently owned by Royal Mail Group Limited.
