= 2022–2023 United Kingdom postal workers' strikes =

Strikes by Royal Mail and Post Office workers

Post Office and Royal Mail strikes
- Part of the 2021–present UK cost-of-living crisis and UK industrial disputes and strikes (2022–present)
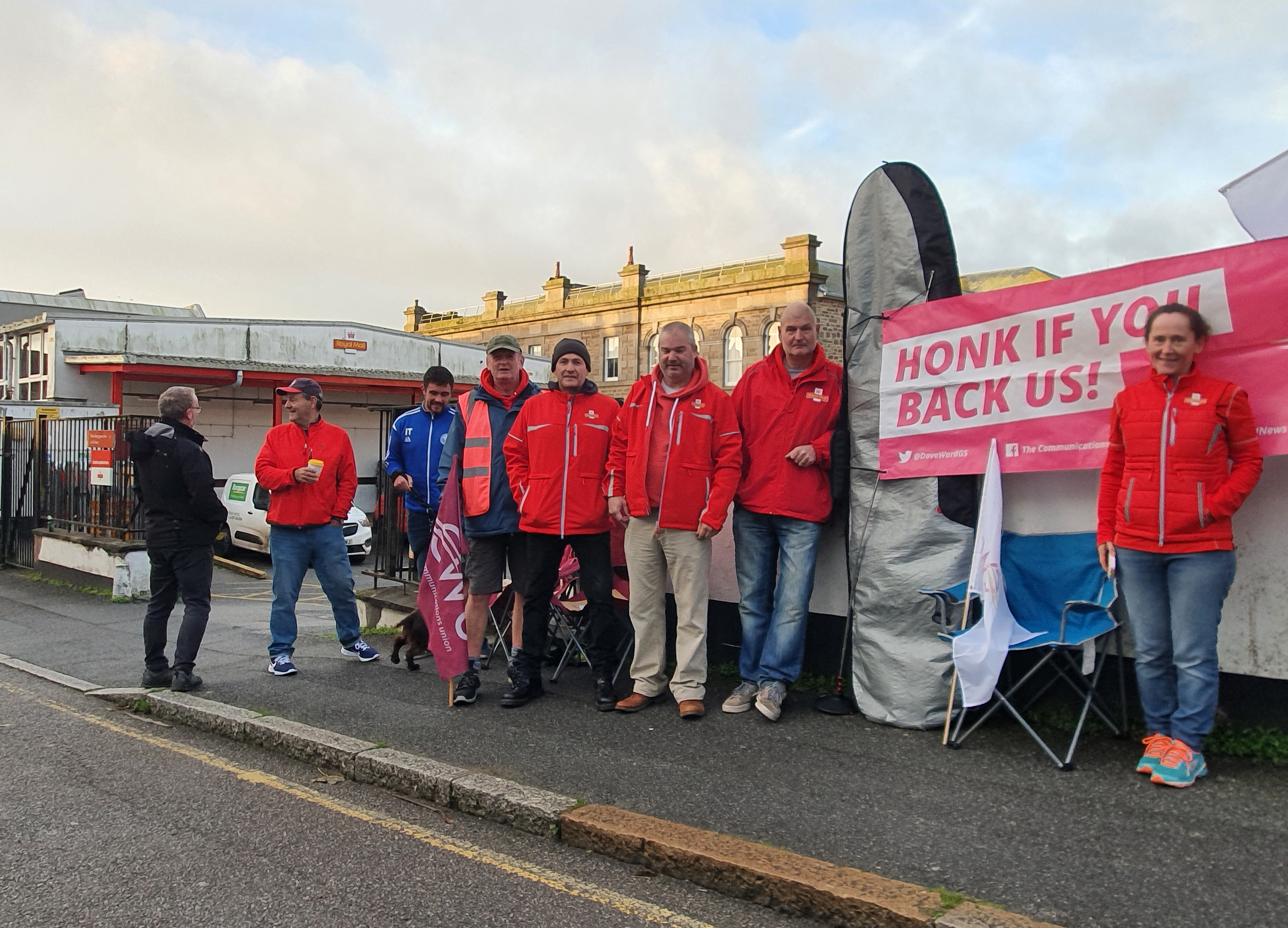
- Picket line outside a sorting office in Penzance in October 2022
- Date: May 2022 – July 2023
- Location: United Kingdom
- Status: Post Office strikes ended in April 2023; Royal Mail strikes ended in July 2023

Parties
Post Office Limited; Royal Mail	CWU; Unite

Lead figures
Simon Thompson, Royal Mail CEO: Nick Read, Post Office Limited CEO	Dave Ward, CWU General Secretary: Sharon Graham, Unite General Secretary

Starting in May 2022, postal workers in the United Kingdom undertook a series of strikes and industrial disputes. They principally involved members of Unite and the Communication Workers Union (CWU) at both Royal Mail and the Post Office. Post Office strikes ended in April 2023 after workers agreed to a 9% pay rise plus a cash lump sum. The Royal Mail strikes ended three months later in July 2023 after workers agreed to a three-year pay deal with Royal Mail.

== Background ==
The United Kingdom saw an increase in industrial action in 2022. This came during the cost of living crisis, and after high inflation, stagnant wage growth and the effects of the COVID-19 pandemic.

== Post Office strikes ==
A CWU ballot approved strike action on 28 March 2022. Members went on a one-day strike on 3 May 2022 over pay; members had their wages frozen for 2021 and were offered a 2% increase plus a £250 one-off payment for 2022. The CWU said the offer was "exceptionally poor" given that Retail Price Index inflation had reached 9%. The Post Office maintained that "the vast majority" of branches would remain unaffected. Around 3,500 members were involved in the dispute.

Workers went on strike again on Saturday 4 June 2022 during the Platinum Jubilee of Elizabeth II, after the Post Office had made a pay offer of a 2.5% plus a £500 payment. The CWU said all 114 crown post offices (those managed directly by Post Office Ltd) would close for the day and that action by supply-chain workers would mean that there would be no cash collections or deliveries to post offices on Monday 6 June.

A third strike day was organised for 11 July 2022 after members rejected a pay plan with a 3% rise and £500 payment. Andy Furey, the CWU assistant secretary, said that the Post Office's offers continued to represent a "massive real-terms pay cut". Supply-chain staff also went on strike on 14 July, affecting collections and deliveries at thousands of post offices.

The CWU announced the fourth round of strikes on 12 August 2022 to be held on 26, 27, and 30 August – with all members striking on 26 August to coincide with the Royal Mail action the same day, crown office workers striking on 27 August, and supply-chain staff striking on 30 August.

Another day of strike action was held on 28 September, the last day covered by the six month period of the initial strike ballot. The Post Office had increased their pay offer to a 5% rise with a £500 lump sum, but the CWU stated that the offer remained "some considerable way behind" inflation. Furey said that the union intended to hold a second ballot to renew its mandate for strike action. The results of the second ballot were announced on 17 November, with 91% in favour of a strike and 92% in favour of action short of a strike on a 65% turnout.

In December 2022, CWU members at Post Office began action short of a strike, including working to rule, not taking overtime and conducting a sales boycott. A two-day strike of administration and crown post office staff began on 12 December. Action short of a strike was paused in February 2023 to allow for pay talks to resume.

In March 2023, the CWU presented a new pay deal to members: a 9% pay rise plus lump sum payments of between £1925 and £3000. Union leadership endorsed a 'yes' vote, with Furey saying that the deal was "the best that can be achieved via these negotiations". Results were announced on 11 April and the deal was accepted with 94% of votes in favour on a turnout of 73%.

== Royal Mail strikes ==
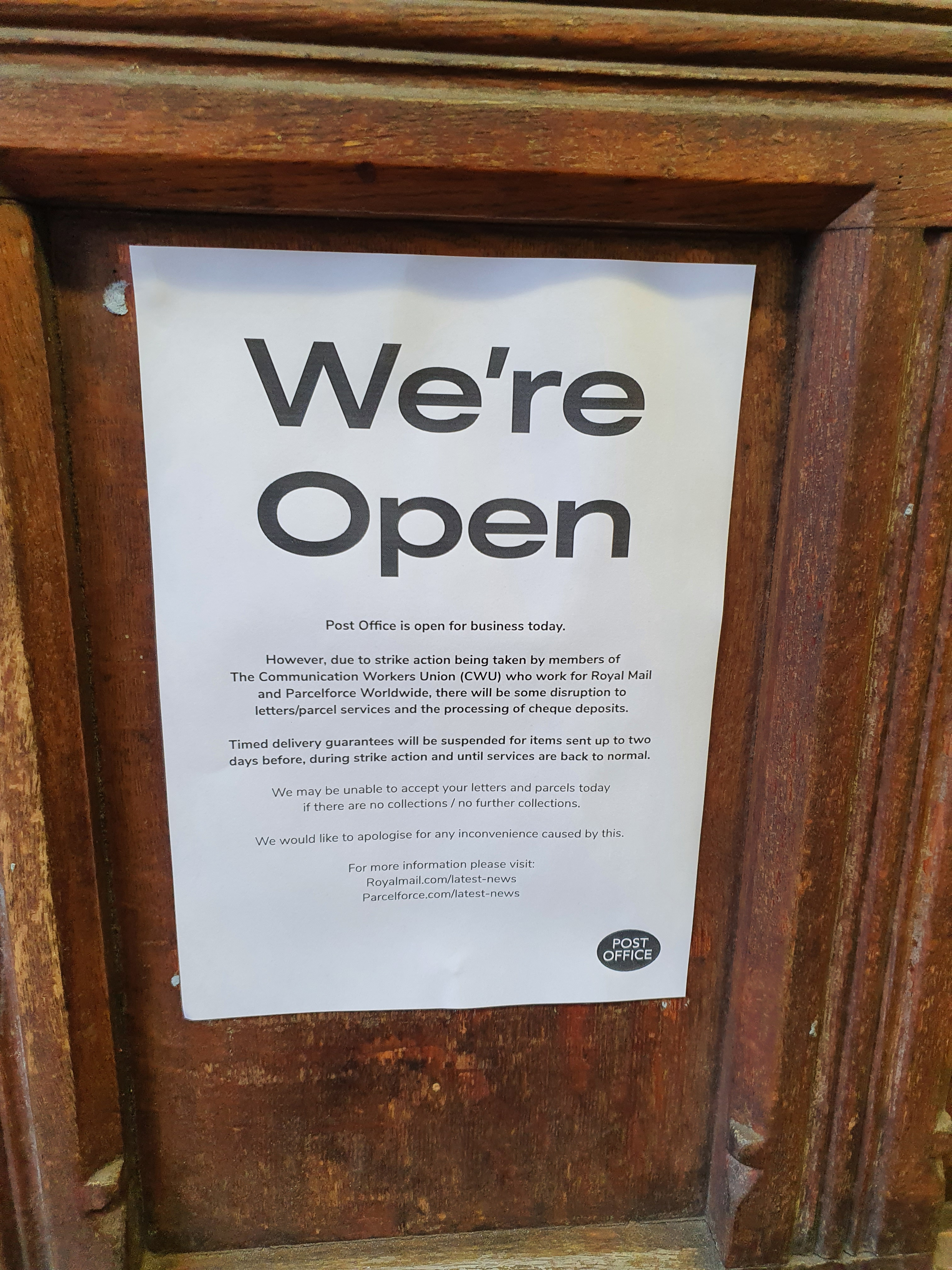
Notice warning of postal service disruption due to strikes in Oxford in October 2022

On 29 June 2022, Royal Mail managers in Unite voted to approve strike action and industrial action short of a strike over job cuts and a redeployment programme which the union claimed would result in "worsening terms and conditions". In England, Wales and Scotland, 86% of members voted to strike and 91% for action short of a strike. In Northern Ireland, 89% voted to strike and 88% for action short of a strike. The action included around 2,400 managers across over 1,000 delivery offices.

The CWU announced a second ballot on 20 July 2022 over Royal Mail's proposed job restructuring. Royal Mail said it would consider splitting its postal business from its more profitable international logistics operations if unions would not accept the restructuring plan, noting that it was losing up to £1 million per day. The CWU criticised Royal Mail for "pleading poverty" despite having posted a full-year operating profit of £758 million two months before.

On 17 August 2022, CWU announced that members at Royal Mail had voted by 98.7% for further strike days over terms and conditions (adding to the separate dispute over pay) on a 72% turnout. The CWU later announced the first round of strikes to be held on 26 and 31 August, and 8–9 September respectively.

On 7 September 2022, the CWU said that its members had rejected a 5.5% pay offer and supported another two day strike on 30 September and 1 October. CWU action planned for 9 September (as the second half of a 48-hour strike) was cancelled after the death of Elizabeth II "out of respect for her service to the country and her family".

On 22 September 2022, Royal Mail wrote to the CWU proposing that talks should be taken to Acas, the industrial relations arbitration body, after five months of negotiations and three dispute resolution procedures had not resulted in any agreement.

On 27 September 2022, the CWU announced that 93.5% of members had again voted to continue strike action, and said it was planning 19 further days of strikes across October and November to cover peak periods such as Black Friday, Cyber Monday and the buildup to Christmas.

CWU members at Royal Mail once again walked out on 13 October 2022, causing no letters to be delivered and parcel delivery to be disrupted. Strikes were held on 20 and 25 October.

=== New pay deal offered and Christmas strikes ===
On 31 October 2022, Royal Mail CEO Simon Thompson announced a new 18-month 9% pay deal to postal workers, stating that this was the "best and final offer" that the company could afford. General Secretary of the CWU Dave Ward responded by accusing Royal Mail of "imposing change not negotiating" whilst announcing that the CWU would call off most of the November strikes up until Black Friday so that it could consult its members on the deal. This began a period of negotiation between Royal Mail and the CWU which lasted for much of the month.

On 17 November 2022, the CWU formally rejected the pay deal, stating that the "livelihoods of postal workers were at stake" and announced that the strike days over Black Friday would go ahead, as well as additional strike days on 9, 11, 14, 15, 23 and 24 December. The Christmas strikes resulted in severe delays to mail across the UK.

=== End of strikes ===
The Royal Mail strikes ended in July 2023 after workers agreed to a three-year pay deal. Seventy-six per cent of union members voted in favour of the agreement, which included a ten per cent salary increase and a one-off lump sum of five-hundred pounds, in a ballot with a sixty-seven per cent turnout.

== Response ==
Bright Green reported in August 2022 that 53% of the public saw industrial action by postal workers as justified, compared to 32% who saw it as unjustified.

During the Conservative Party leadership election in July 2022, Liz Truss proposed legislation to increase restrictions on strikes in certain industries, including the postal sector. These plans included increasing the ballot threshold from 40% to 50%, increasing the minimum notice period for strikes from two weeks to four, and introducing a cooling-off period to limit the amount a union could conduct industrial action. Although Truss won the leadership election and the Transport Strikes (Minimum Service Levels) Bill was introduced on 20 October 2022, the bill did not include the postal sector and Truss resigned on 21 October following a government crisis.
