= RelayOne =

British email to postal system service

- Logo of RelayOne, 2000
- Product type: Email to postal system service
- Produced by: Royal Mail
- Country: United Kingdom; United States
- Introduced: 1998
- Discontinued: 2000
- Tagline: Welcome to the post office of the future... open for business today
- Website: relayone.co.uk

RelayOne was an email to postal system service run by the United Kingdom's Royal Mail from 1998 until 2000. The company described it as a modern-day telegram.

== History ==
The service launched in the United Kingdom in March 1998, and by April of that year a United States launch was planned.

The service cost £1.50 per page, and up to 50 pages could be sent for £5, which was a significantly higher cost than the price of a postage stamp. The email would be printed by Royal Mail in London and then posted in the regular mail to its recipient. A selection of greeting cards that could be printed was later added. Royal Mail's technology partner for the system was the American company, Microsoft.

The service was discontinued in 2000 as it was not commercially viable. At the time of its demise, RelayOne was handling 400 items a month. Royal Mail did however continue to support a similar free of charge system used to send mail to the British Armed Forces serving overseas.
