= 2007 Royal Mail industrial disputes =

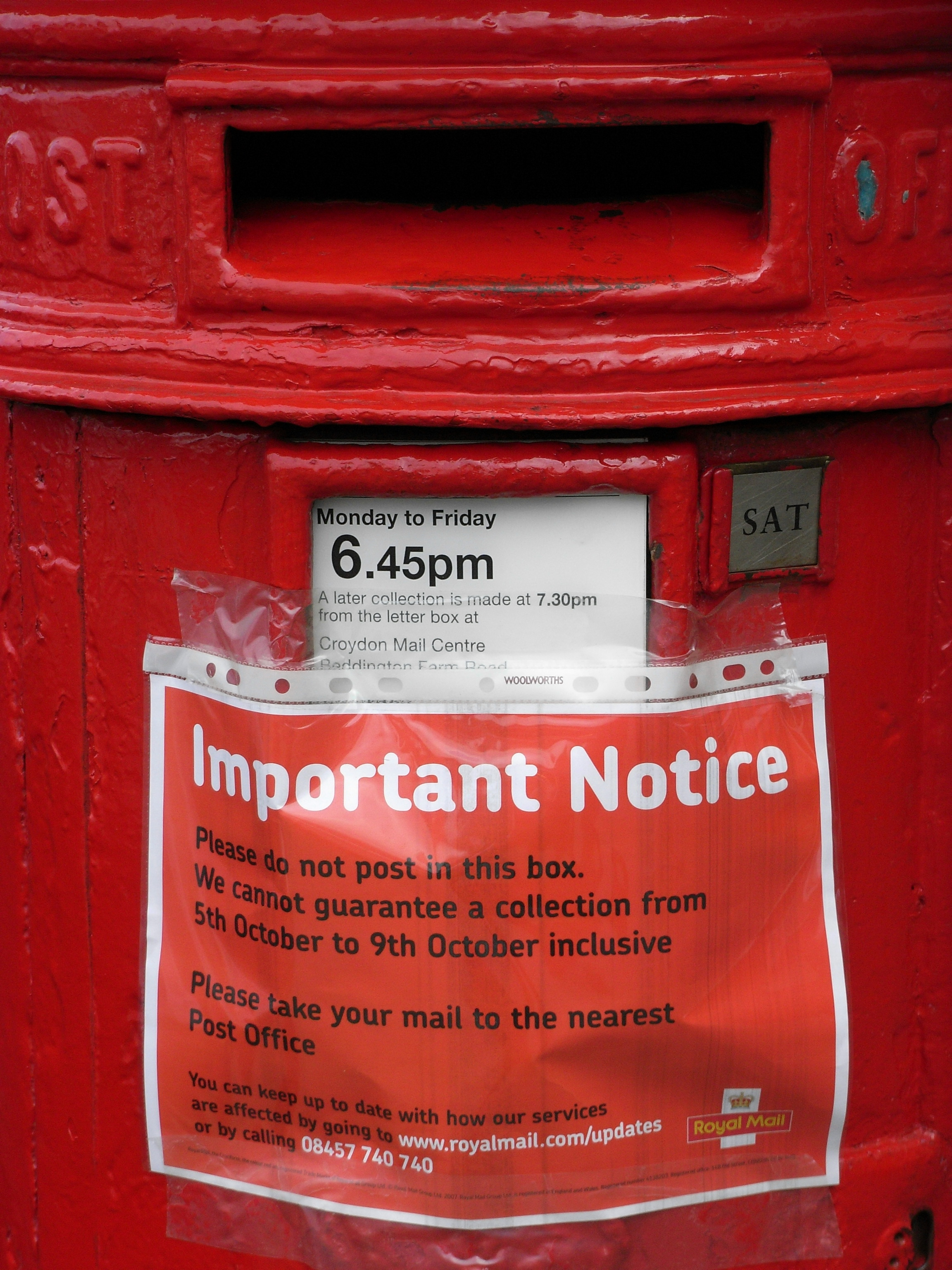
Notice about the postal strike on a pillar box

The 2007 Royal Mail industrial disputes were a series of industrial disputes between Royal Mail and the Communication Workers Union in the United Kingdom.

== Background ==
The dispute centred on 'modernisation plans' which Royal Mail said were required to remain competitive, however the CWU believed that these might have led to around 40,000 job losses. Additionally there were disputes surrounding flexible working hours, pay rises and pensions.

=== Royal Mail position ===
Royal Mail claimed that flexibility is vital to the business, and that it was entirely reasonable for employees normally employed in one capacity to cover other roles as required to cope with variations in the work levels in each area. The company was also adamant that increased automation (and fewer employees) were necessary to bring costs under control. The unions were accused of retaining numerous Spanish practices which prevent flexible working.

=== CWU position ===
The CWU accused Royal Mail of treating its employees as slaves, and regarded a level of flexibility which would have seen employees doing different jobs on a daily basis as unacceptable.

=== Government position ===
The CWU called on the government to "intervene in a positive way". Until early October, the government maintained its stance that this was a matter for Royal Mail and the union to sort out. However, in early October Gordon Brown called on the CWU to reach an agreement on the terms offered, a move that was condemned by the TUC.

=== Public view ===
Public opinion was divided, with some strongly in support of the Postal Workers, and others supporting Royal Mail and condemning the disruption caused by the strikes.

== Strike dates ==
- 29 June 2007 - First strike
- 12–13 July 2007 - Second set of strikes
- 4–5 October 2007 - Business-wide CWU strike
- 8–9 October 2007 - Business-wide CWU strike
- 10–11 October 2007 - All CWU union members return to work, however wildcat strikes continue in Liverpool and London.

== Key events ==
- On 7 June 2007 the union's postal members voted by 77.5% in favour of industrial action after a 2.5% pay rise coupled with £350million every year for five years (totaling £1.5 billion) of cuts was offered.
- They took their first one-day strike on Friday 29 June 2007, and the second on 12/13 July.
  - The action then progressed to a series of rolling strikes designed to cause as much disruption as possible.
- On 9 August strikes were called off when Royal Mail chairman Allan Leighton and CWU General Secretary Billy Hayes began secret talks.
  - These negotiations failed and industrial action began again on 5 October.
  - This time two national strikes of 48 hours were called.
  - These took place on Friday 5 and Saturday 6 October, and then Monday 8 and Tuesday 9 October.
  - In between these dates was a Sunday so no deliveries took place between the Friday and Tuesday, but resumed on Wednesday with a large backlog of undelivered mail.
- On 6 October 2007 a march of over 100 postal workers supported by local groups of TUC members, a pensioners group against Post Office closures and the local branch of the Socialist Party took place in Stoke on Trent, stretching 2 miles from Burslem to Hanley. A rally at the end featured many speakers including local CWU deputy branch secretary, Mick Pender, and Socialist Party member Andy Bentley.
- On 12 October, Royal Mail challenged the legality of the next phase of the planned action, claiming that the notice of the strike had been improperly issued.
- 24 hour strikes were planned for;
  - Monday 15 October from 6pm at Mail sorting offices and airports
  - Tuesday 16 October from 3am at Deliveries and collection hubs
  - Wednesday 17 October from midday for Royal Mail drivers
  - Thursday 18 October from midday for Manual data entry centres
  - Thursday 18 October from 2pm at Heathrow world distribution centre.
- In late afternoon 12 October, Royal Mail succeeded in obtaining an injunction at London's High Court banning the scheduled strikes starting on 15 and 16 October. The union responded by issuing a suspension of the strikes. In addition, the planned actions in Airports and Separate Collection Hubs were withdrawn because of the small numbers involved.
- On the evening of 12 October, Royal Mail and the CWU reached an agreement which was discussed by the union executive on 15–16 October and endorsed by 9 votes to 5.

== Local issues ==
- Industrial action took place in Burslem (Stoke on Trent) following the suspension of postal worker, Dave Condliffe, in relation to allegations of aggressive behaviour towards two managers. Wildcat strikes took place earlier in the year with support from the local branch of the Socialist Party.
- On 10 October CWU members in London and Liverpool started an unofficial strike in response to changes in flexible working that meant they would have to start at 6am and finish not before 2.15pm. It was reported that all of South West London is out, East London, Peterborough, Walsall and Manchester also were involved in unofficial action.
- On 12 October, staff in Edinburgh and Grangemouth walked out in unofficial action in reaction to Royal Mail's decision to deduct pay for both the previous weeks walkout and that weeks walkout from a single pay packet

== Royal Mail response ==
Royal Mail drafted in managers from non-operational roles to attempt to keep some mail moving through the system, and offered opportunities for those CWU members who wish to work to do so at other offices to avoid conflict with striking colleagues, but the strike still had a major impact on the operation.

== See also ==
- 1971 United Kingdom postal workers strike
- 1988 United Kingdom postal workers strike
- 2009 Royal Mail industrial disputes
