= 1988 United Kingdom postal workers strike =

The 1988 United Kingdom postal workers strike was a strike in the United Kingdom in August and September 1988. It was the country's first national postal strike for 17 years, and began after postal workers at Royal Mail walked out in protest over bonuses being paid to recruit new workers in London and the South East. As a result, postal deliveries throughout the United Kingdom were disrupted for several weeks.

The strike action started on 31 August when members of the Union of Communication Workers walked out to protest against 2.75% bonuses, and it was intended as a 24-hour stoppage. However, the strike continued after temporary workers were hired to clear the backlog of undelivered mail. By 5 September the industrial action had spread with a quarter of the country's postal workers on strike, and by the time an agreement was reached the following week, the strike had spread throughout the British mainland (workers in Northern Ireland did not strike). No mail was being delivered by this point and, in order to ease the backlog of post, bosses at Royal Mail placed an embargo on the delivery of overseas mail. By the time the strike ended there was a backlog of 150 million undelivered letters and parcels.

The postal strike sparked a rise in the sale of fax machines, which helped ease the impact of the strike.

The issue of temporary workers also led to some violence. In an incident at a sorting office in Liverpool, three men were arrested and charged with disorderly behaviour after pickets threw bottles at workers arriving at the facility.

The strike came to an end on 13 September after union representatives and Royal Mail managers held talks over the preceding weekend. However, because of the backlog of mail, deliveries remained unreliable for several weeks afterwards.

The strike led to a delay in the receipt of information concerning the September 1988 unemployment statistics which were briefly over-recorded as a result.

== See also ==
- 1971 United Kingdom postal workers strike
- 2007 Royal Mail industrial disputes
- 2009 Royal Mail industrial disputes
