= Simon Thompson (Royal Mail) =

British business executive

- Born: 1966 or 1967 (age 59–60)
- Occupation: Business executive
- Title: Former CEO of Royal Mail
- Term: 2021–2023

Simon Thompson (born August 1966) is a British business executive. Thompson was a non-executive director of Royal Mail until May 2023 when he resigned from the role following industrial action that took place in response to a cost-cutting and restructuring plan.

During the COVID-19 pandemic, he was managing director of the Test and Trace App, a key element of the UK government's widely-criticized £37 billion Test and Trace scheme. Before that, he was Chief Product Officer at Ocado. He has also worked at Apple, HSBC, lastminute.com, Morrisons and Honda Europe.

In May 2023, it was announced that Thompson would "step down" as head of Royal Mail. In the statement announcing his departure, Mr Thompson said he had been "incredibly proud to lead Royal Mail during this crucial period, and the changes made and negotiated have given Royal Mail a chance to compete and grow." The Communication Workers Union (CWU) had previously called for Thompson to step down. Despite the financial impact caused by Thompson's failure to reach a settlement with the CWU during the company's busiest period, he received a payout of approximately £257,000.

In May, 2024, more than a year after Thompson's restructuring and cost-cutting measures had been implemented, the formerly state-owned company posted a £336 million loss.

== Criticism ==
In 2023, as Royal Mail's CEO, Thompson appeared twice before the UK parliament's business, energy and industrial strategy select committee (BEIS). The first BEIS cross-party committee in January 2023, chaired by MP Darren Jones, heard testimony from Thompson and also from Dave Ward, the General Secretary of the Communication Workers Union on issues related to Royal Mail workers' industrial action.

In January 2023, Mr Thompson provided a detailed response to the Select Committee meeting, covering all questions raised during the hearing.

Thompson appeared before the BEIS committee for a second time because he was recalled by MPs who felt he had not given "wholly correct" answers at his first appearance. Thompson's second appearance was also noteworthy due to the fact that Darren Jones had deemed it necessary that Thompson, Royal Mail's chair Keith Williams, and operations development director Ricky McAuley all swear an oath to tell the truth before the committee under a warning of contempt of parliament and a "potential perjury."

Summing up the session, Jones was quoted in The Guardian as suggesting a common theme among answers given to the committee by Thompson and his two associates: "We have rogue posters, rogue managers, we have isolated incidents, we have a global pandemic, we have industrial action," he said. "It is everyone else's fault, nothing to do with me, guv [sic]."

== Investigations into data misuse at Royal Mail ==
In December 2023, the Information Commissioner's Office (ICO) wrote to the BEIS committee following concerns raised about personal data use. Despite the hundreds of anecdotal reports of data misuse mentioned during the BEIS committee hearings, they concluded that there is insufficient evidence of misuse of personal information and stated they were satisfied that Royal Mail had identified and rely on a lawful basis of use.

== Prioritisation of tracked parcels over letters and non-tracked items at Royal Mail ==
As a result of public concerns raised to the BEIS committee, in January 2024, OFCOM published a report on Royal Mail's quality of service. They concluded that "in the evidence we assessed, we did not identify any suggestion that Royal Mail's senior management had directed the prioritization of parcels over letters outside of recognized contingency plans." However, a Sunday Times undercover investigation concluded that the tracked parcels were being prioritised by Royal Mail in breach of company policy. This investigation also lines up with claims made by postal workers to the BBC and hundreds of complaints made to the BEIS committee Chair, Darren Jones.
