= 2009 Royal Mail industrial disputes =

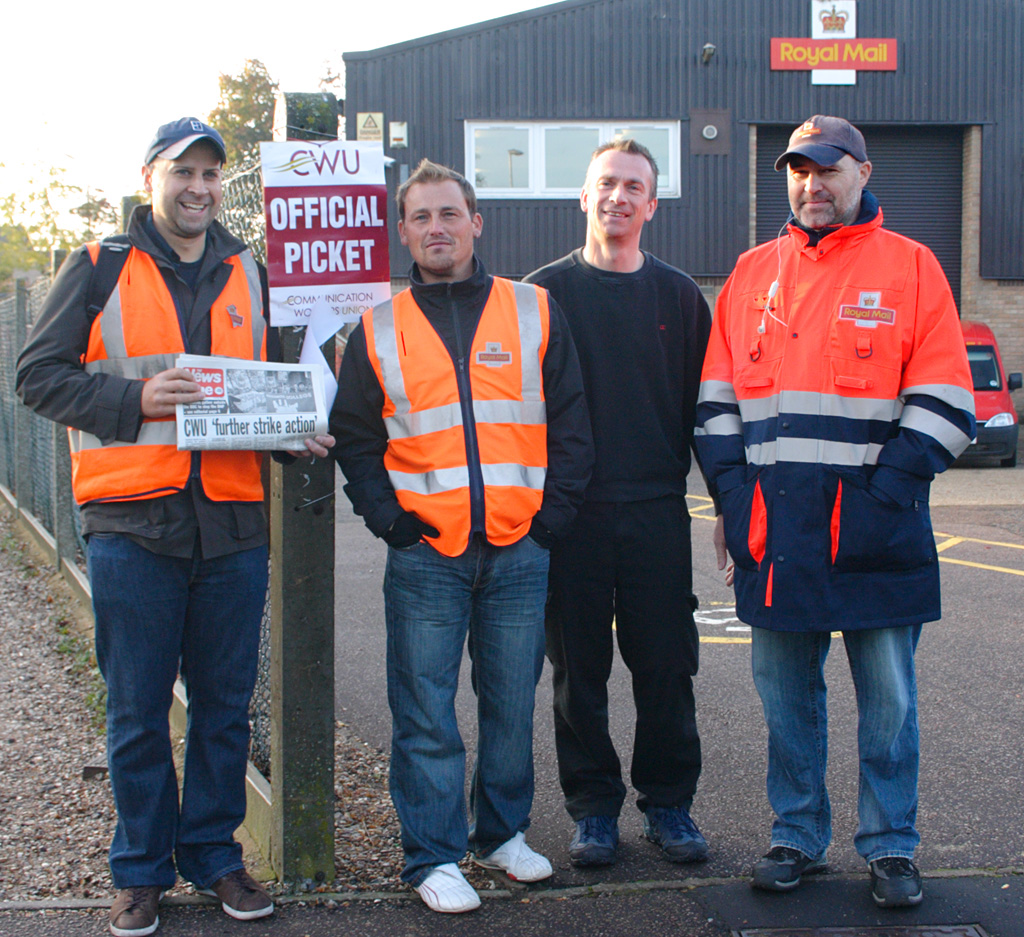
Picket line at the Royal Mail Bowthorpe depot.

The 2009 Royal Mail industrial disputes is an industrial dispute in the United Kingdom involving Royal Mail and members of the Communication Workers Union (CWU), which began in the summer of 2009. It was the country's first industrial action involving postal workers since 2007 and came about after the Communication Workers Union accused Royal Mail of refusing to enter into dialogue regarding how the implementation of modernisation plans would affect the job security of postal workers.

The strike action began on a local level after postal workers at Royal Mail offices in London and Edinburgh accused their bosses of cutting jobs and services, which they claimed broke the 2007 Pay and Modernisation Agreement, the agreement that was struck to end the 2007 strikes, and accused Royal Mail of threatening modernisation of the service. After a series of localised walkouts over the summer months, and after failing to reach an agreement, the CWU opened a national ballot for industrial action in September 2009.

On 8 October, it was announced that postal workers had voted three to one in favour of taking strike action over job security and working conditions. It was later announced that a national strike would be held on Thursday 22 October and Friday 23 October. After further talks failed, more strikes were announced to take place on Thursday 29 October, Friday 30 October and Saturday 31 October. Discussions continued throughout the second wave of strikes with proposals being put to both sides, but these were overshadowed by the announcement of a third walkout on Friday 6 November and Monday 9 November. However, on 5 November it was announced that strikes had been called off until the New Year to allow time for fresh talks to take place. A resolution to the dispute was finally reached following lengthy discussions on 8 March 2010, and on 27 April it was reported that postal workers voted to accept the deal.

== Background ==
Central to the 2009 dispute was the agreement that ended the 2007 round of strikes. The 2007 Pay and Modernisation Agreement saw the parties involved agree to a four-phase plan, which would be implemented with dialogue between both sides at each stage of the process. However, the Communication Workers Union said that although Royal Mail had carried out three of the phases in this way, it had refused to discuss the final phase, which concerned the government's plans for modernisation, and how these would affect the job security of Royal Mail employees.

One of the key aspects of Royal Mail's modernisation drive involved the introduction of the walk sequencing machine that organises mail into the order the postman will deliver them on his round. The union feared that a national introduction of this equipment would lead to thousands of full-time workers being made redundant and a significant increase in the number of part-time staff. The Communication Workers Union argued that although it had signed up to this part of the agreement in 2007 and that the plans would make it necessary for some jobs to be lost, it had not understood the exact nature of Royal Mail's plan. Furthermore, the union said that when Royal Mail stopped talking to staff about the long-term effects of job security, there had been no choice other than to threaten a strike to restart discussions. Royal Mail, on the other hand, said that it had not stopped talking to the union and continued to involve it in its modernisation strategy.

== Localised strike action ==
Localised strike action began in June 2009 when workers at Royal Mail offices in London and Edinburgh staged a 24-hour strike on 19 June over concerns about the impact that modernisation would have on postal workers. This was followed the next day by a similar walkout in parts of Scotland. Speaking about the situation at the time Dave Ward, the CWU's deputy general secretary said, "We are now seeing cuts but not modernisation in the postal industry and there's only so long before this is going have a major impact on services. The CWU does not and has not blocked change. Once again we are seeing Royal Mail working against the union and failing to engage the workforce." Ward also said that his union would offer Royal Mail and the government a three-month no-strike deal if Royal Mail fulfilled its part of the 2007 agreement.

However, talks between the Communication Workers Union and Royal Mail failed to broker a deal. The CWU criticised Royal Mail's business policy as "chaos management" and in August and September the localised strike intensified. By September it was estimated that there was a backlog of 20 million undelivered letters. On 10 September the CWU announced plans to hold a national ballot on strike action, the results of which were expected to be announced on 30 September during the Labour Party Conference. Royal Mail responded to the announcement by saying that the decision to go ahead with the ballot was "wholly irresponsible" as talks were still ongoing.

== Strike ballot and national action ==
Ballot papers proposing a national strike were sent out to union members on 17 September. On 8 October it was announced that postal workers had voted three to one in favour of taking strike action over job security and working conditions. The first round of strikes were later scheduled for Thursday 22 October and Friday 23 October. These would consist of two 24-hour stoppages, with mail centre staff and drivers striking on 22 October and delivery and collection staff doing likewise the following day.

Talks between Royal Mail and the CWU continued, but relations were strained by the emergence of a leaked document suggesting that Royal Mail would achieve its reforms "with or without union engagement". CWU general secretary Billy Hayes called the document's contents "an organised attempt to sideline the union" and expressed his concern that Business Secretary Peter Mandelson appeared to be familiar with it. Furthermore, following the first round of strikes, it emerged that both sides had been "tantalisingly close" to brokering a deal on the evening of 20 October, but that Royal Mail had backed away from this the following morning. Consequently, the strikes went ahead as planned.

New talks were announced on 24 October, which would be brokered by the TUC and chaired by its general secretary Brendan Barber. Peter Mandelson welcomed the talks, describing them as "an opportunity to break the deadlock". Further strikes were also announced for the last three days of October, which would involve mail centre staff on 29 and 30 October and delivery staff on 31 October. Three days of negotiations aimed at ending the dispute began on 26 October, but although they were described by Barber as having been useful, they ended without agreement and the second wave of strikes went ahead. Royal Mail later blamed a hard core element of London postal union leaders for refusing to endorse a proposal that both sides had agreed to.

Discussions were held during the second wave of strikes, when Brendan Barber announced on the afternoon of Friday 30 October that proposals had been put to both Royal Mail and the CWU for them to consider over the weekend. Talks resumed on the Monday, however this news was overshadowed by the announcement that a further two days of strikes would be held on Friday 6 November and Monday 9 November. It was also announced that these would be all out strikes with everybody walking out at the same time rather than the rolling strike action that had been adopted previously, thus leading to a complete stoppage throughout the course of the action. These were later called off in order for further talks to take place.

=== Effects ===
The strike action led to a backlog of tens of millions of items of undelivered mail, with an estimated 30 million letters and parcels affected after the first wave of walkouts, and rising to in excess of 50 million following the second.

On Tuesday 3 November a YouGov poll conducted for The Daily Telegraph appeared to show that public support for the industrial action had dropped in comparison to a similar poll conducted two weeks earlier.

It was also reported that the CWU had started a fighting fund to help support postal workers who were experiencing financial difficulties as a result of the strike. Postmen lose a day's pay for each day they strike, and although most workers had lost just two days pay so far, many in the London area who had taken part in previous industrial action earlier in the year had lost as much as 18 days of wages. There was also speculation that the CWU lacked the funds for a lengthy dispute and donations to the union's fighting fund were pledged by other unions, including UNISON and Unite.

== Suspension of strike action ==
On 5 November, the eve of the first planned all out strike it was announced that strike action had been called off until at least the New Year to allow for what Brendan Barber described as "a period of calm" in which both Royal Mail and the CWU could reach a long-term agreement. But he added that although the postal service would be free from disruption over the Christmas period, a long-term deal was still some distance away. The CWU also announced on the same day that it would not press ahead with a legal challenge to Royal Mail's employment of temporary workers to clear the backlog, which had been due to begin at the High Court the following day.

== Resolution ==
Following lengthy discussions between Royal Mail managers and union representatives a deal to settle the dispute was finally agreed to on 8 March 2010. This would see Royal Mail workers receiving a 6.9% pay rise over three years (worth 2% in 2010, 1.4% in 2011 and 3.5% in 2012), while extra payments worth up to £1,400 would be made to full-time workers once all the agreed changes have been made. These will take the form of a £400 payment following the agreement of union members and a further £1,000 to be paid once the planned changes have been implemented. In addition the Royal Mail agreed to keep 75% of the workforce as full-time, rather than part-time staff, and to reduce working hours from 40 to 39 hours a week. In exchange, the CWU agreed to Royal Mail's modernisation strategy which include plans to introduce the automated walk sequencing machinery.

Welcoming the deal, the deputy general secretary of the Communication Workers Union, Dave Ward said, "It's been a long time coming, but this deal delivers on the major issues that postal workers have fought for. There's a balance of pay and operational changes that will help to offset job losses and ensure our members are fairly rewarded for change." Royal Mail's outgoing chief executive, Adam Crozier said that the resolution was "a good deal for our customers as it ensures stability over the next three years," and allowed Royal Mail to proceed with modernisation. On 27 April the Communication Workers Union announced that its members had voted two to one in favour of the deal, thus ending the dispute.

== See also ==
- 1971 United Kingdom postal workers strike
- 1988 United Kingdom postal workers strike
- 2007 Royal Mail industrial disputes
