= 1971 United Kingdom postal workers strike =

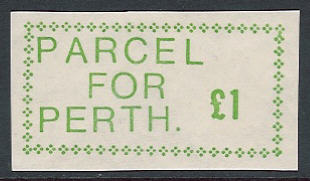
A £1 stamp from Scotland produced during the 1971 Postal Strike.

The 1971 United Kingdom postal workers strike was a strike in the United Kingdom staged by postal workers between January and March 1971.

== Details ==
The strike was Britain's first national postal strike and began after postal workers demanded a pay rise of 15–20 per cent then walked out after Post Office managers made a lower offer. The strike began on 20 January and lasted for seven weeks, finally ending with an agreement on 4 March. After voting over the weekend, the strikers returned to work on 8 March. The strike overlapped with the introduction of decimal currency in the UK.

== Private posts ==
A wide range of officially licensed and unlicensed private posts operated during the strike to fill the gap left by the withdrawal of official postal services. Some were genuine commercial services that provided local, national and international deliveries, but many were set up by stamp collectors and stamp dealers to provide philatelic material for collectors.

== Legacy ==
The progressive rock band Yes owes its success to the effects of the strike. In February, it released The Yes Album, its third album. Since its first two had not been very successful, they had hired a new manager, Brian Lane. He promised he would make the album a hit.

The strike prevented Melody Maker magazine from compiling its weekly sales charts of albums and singles, since record stores could not mail in their reports of sales figures. In their absence, the media used a chart compiled by Richard Branson, owner of the Virgin record store on Oxford Street in London, based on sales at his store and a few others in the capital. Lane went to Virgin and bought as many copies of The Yes Album as he could to ensure it became the top-selling album at the store, and thus prominent in Branson's chart. As a result, the album began selling well enough nationally that after the strike, when Melody Maker was able to resume publishing its charts, it reached No. 4 and remained on the charts for 34 weeks, selling well over a million copies.

== See also ==
- 1988 United Kingdom postal workers strike
- 2007 Royal Mail industrial disputes
- 2009 Royal Mail industrial disputes
