= Keith Williams (businessman) =

British business executive (born 1956)

Keith Williams CBE
- Born: 13 May 1956 (age 70); Teesside, England
- Education: University of Liverpool
- Occupation: Businessman
- Employer(s): Halfords; Royal Mail
- Known for: Royal Mail (2018–present); Halfords (2018–present); British Airways (2011–2016); John Lewis (until 2019)
- Title: Chairman of Halfords and Royal Mail

Keith Williams CBE (born 13 May 1956) is a British businessman who has been chairman of Halfords and Royal Mail since 2018. He was chief executive officer (CEO) of British Airways from 2011 to 2016.

== Early life ==
Williams was born in Teesside, England, attended Guisborough Grammar School, and received an undergraduate degree from the University of Liverpool.

== Career ==
Williams spent his early career with Boots, Apple Inc., and Reckitt and Colman.

In 1998, Williams left Reckitt and Colman, and joined British Airways, rising to CEO in 2011, and then chairman. In April 2016, he was succeeded by Álex Cruz as chairman.

Williams has been a non-executive director and deputy chairman of John Lewis, and a non-executive director of Aviva until May 2019.

Williams has been the chairman of Halfords since July 2018.

In May 2019, Williams, then deputy chairman, and a board member since January 2018, succeeded Les Owen as chairman of Royal Mail.

In May 2020, Rico Back resigned as CEO of Royal Mail with immediate effect, and Williams, the chairman, replaced him as executive chairman.

Williams is the independent chair of the Government-supported Rail Review.

== Honours ==
In 2019, Williams was awarded an honorary doctorate by Teesside University. He was appointed Commander of the Order of the British Empire (CBE) in the 2022 Birthday Honours for services to the railway industry.

== Personal life ==
Williams is married and has a son and a daughter.

Business positions
Preceded by Willie Walsh	CEO of British Airways; 2011–2016	Succeeded by Álex Cruz
Preceded by Dennis Millard	Chairman of Halfords; 2018–present	Incumbent
Preceded by Les Owen	Chairman of Royal Mail; 2018–present	Incumbent
