= Uhyst castle =

Castle in Germany

Coordinates: 51°22′04″N 14°30′36″E

The New Uhyst Castle (German: Neues Schloss Uhyst) is located on the northern edge of the town of Uhyst in the Saxony district of Görlitz, Germany. It is located near the Spree river flowing through the village and borders the Bärwalder See Landscape Park. The castle grounds have a Baroque garden and an English landscape park.

== History ==
There was already an estate in Uhyst in the 15th century. In the 16th century, Kaspar von Nostitz had a castle built in the local Hirchgarden, which remained in possession of his family until Hans von Warnsdorf Warnsdorf (Adelsgeschlecht) auf Kuhna acquired it in 1607. His son sold it to Hans von Metzradt, who became the feudal lord of Uhyst in 1626. In 1725, Friedrich Caspar Graf von Gersdorff (1699-1751) replaced Metzradt's descendants as feudal lord.

From 1738 to 1742, Gersdorff, who found the Old Castle too small, had the New Castle built according to plans by an Italian architect (possibly also by Johann Christoph Knöffel]) not far from the old building in the village and made it the residence of his family.

In 1745, a sorbs seminary for preachers and teachers, founded in 1730 on Gersdorff's estate in Klix, moved temporarily into the New Castle, along with its school, after the school in Klix had become too small due to the rapidly increasing number of pupils. The Old Castle was demolished in 1836. The other owners of the New Palace were Sigismund von Dallwitz, a member of the Higher Regional Court from 1840, Ernst von Bredow from around 1865 and Rudolf Freiherr von Kratzler from around 1876. In 1883, the New Palace became the property of Ferdinand Johann Balthasar Baron von Rabenau. He had an illegitimate child, Herbert, with his maid Marie Hässler. Marie Hässler was then married to the widowed estate administrator Alvin Kluge, who had a son, Gerhard, and two daughters. After Baron von Rabenau's death in 1899, the castle passed first to Marie and later to Herbert and Gerhard Kluge. After the death of his brother in 1925, Herbert Kluge was the last gentleman at Uhyst Castle in 1945.

During the Second World War, the Schutzstaffel establish a base in Uhyst castle and forced the lord of the castle Herbert Kluge and his family to leave. The director of the Municipal Art Collections of Görlitz, Sigfried Asche, recognized the cultural-historical value of the castle architecture, which was well-preserved at the time. Asche was able to prevent a demolition decided by the Landesboden Commission in March 1948 with a recommendation to use the Social Security Institute Saxony. At the end of the 1940s, the castle was converted into a sanitorium with 120 beds mainly for tuberculosis patients from 1952. In the following decades, the clinic specialized in liver and skin diseases.

By the decision of the district of Hoyerswerda, the hospital was closed in 1992. After the district reform of Saxony, the Niederschlesischer Oberlausitzkreis district was temporarily the castle owner, but after a sale, it went into private ownership. However, the new owner did not comply with the maintenance and renovation of the increasingly dilapidated castle for years and did not pay property tax. Consequently, the castle was forcibly auctioned in March 2006 and acquired for 25,000 euros by a Görlitz real estate agent. Two months later, it was auctioned by a Dutch company at an auction for 62,000 euros. Since spring 2019, the castle's new owner has been Berlin-based investor group.

== Building ==
The originally baroque castle, which housed a chapel with altar, pulpit and organ, was converted into a mansion in neoclassical style in the 19th century. The three-storey building on a rectangular floor plan is about 48.5 meters long, 18.5 meters wide and 13.5 meters high up to the eaves cornice. It has an elevated base floor and a hipped roof. The usable area of the rooms up to four meters high is about 2700 square meters.

The original six to eight rooms and utility rooms per floor were divided into 20 rooms with about 18 square meters each during the conversion into a hospital. Twelve more rooms were built during the lower roof section's expansion. As a result of this construction measure, the south-facing sandstone gable was removed in 1951, whose counterpart on the entrance front with "heavy rolling leaf ornamentation, which can formally only be derived from the Dresden style", has been preserved and crowns a central avant-corp. The Avant-corps is also decorated with a colonnade and a balcony.

== Park ==
A freely accessible park surrounds the castle. A branch of the Spree river flows through the castle park, which feeds water to the smaller of the two ponds. In the larger, the so-called swan pond, there is an island. The old trees include oaks, beech trees, ashes, alders, an elm and panicle squirrels. The park is now part of an artificially created line of sight, oriented towards the Boxberg power station with a view over Bärwalder See.

The part of the park directly adjacent to the castle was created under Friedrich Caspar Graf von Gersdorff, according to the French model, as a French formal garden with a strictly geometric structure. The circular basins of two ornamental sandstone fountains lie on the central axis of the large lawn area. A similar fountain basin is also located in front of the entrance portal of the castle. In the Baroque garden, there are also four sandstone sculptures. On the axis of the fountains stands a putto with harp, flanked by sculptures of the twins Apollo and Artemis. A sculpture of Ceres adorns the eastern path into the garden. The sculptures originally come from the castle park in Mönau. Ferdinand Johann Balthasar Baron von Rabenau had them brought to Uhyst around 1879.

The rest of the park was designed in an English landscape park style. When the Old Castle was demolished in 1836, parts of the park were converted into farmland. Old lime trees, in particular, fell victim to the associated deforestation. Later, owners of the New Castle had other parts of the tree population cut down for economic reasons. Under the royal commission councillor Johann Friedrich August Kessel, who acquired the castle complex in 1856, the castle park was maintained again and expanded. Baron von Rabenau, who had already moved from agriculture to pond management elsewhere, had the ponds of the castle park renewed and enlarged after 1883. In 1897, a flood left severe damage to the facility. Since it was not freely accessible to the Uhyster population before 1945 and in GDR times, a public park was opened in the immediate vicinity in the 1960s. Over the years, the conversion of the castle into a hospital led to large parts of the castle park being used to construct new functional buildings. The driveway to the castle was built around two houses for the nursing sisters and chief doctors.

In 2009, the municipality of Boxberg/O.L. signed a cooperation agreement for the cooperation of the parks of Uhyst and Nochten in the garden culture path on both sides of the Neisse, which benefits the maintenance of the castle park, tourist marketing and the entire facility.
