= Schwarze Pumpe =

Schwarze Pumpe may refer to:

- a district of the city of Spremberg in Brandenburg, Germany
- the Schwarze Pumpe power station located there
