= Ende Gelände 2016 =

Civil disobedience action in Germany

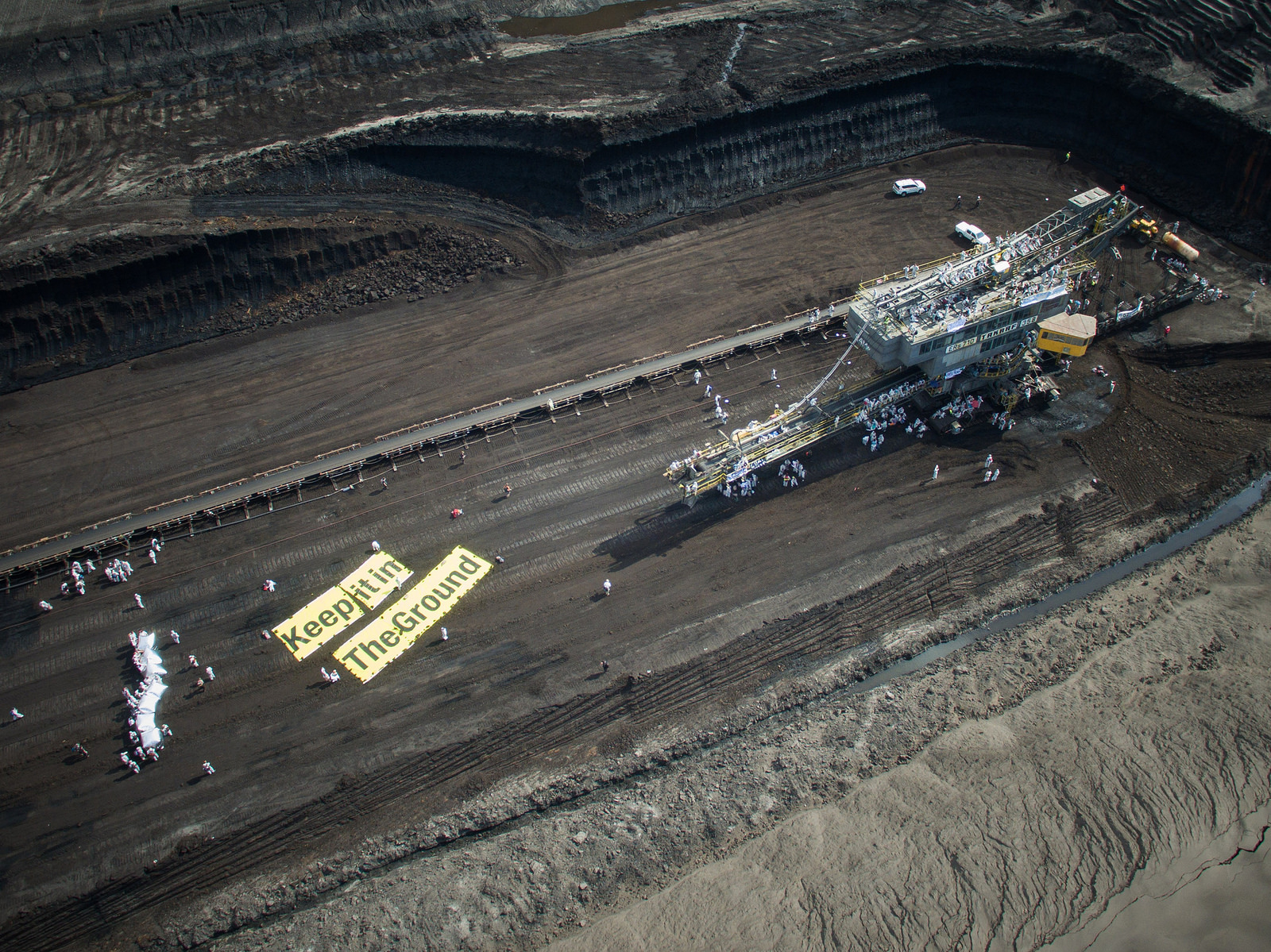
Environmental activists blocking the coal mine during Ende Gelände 2016.

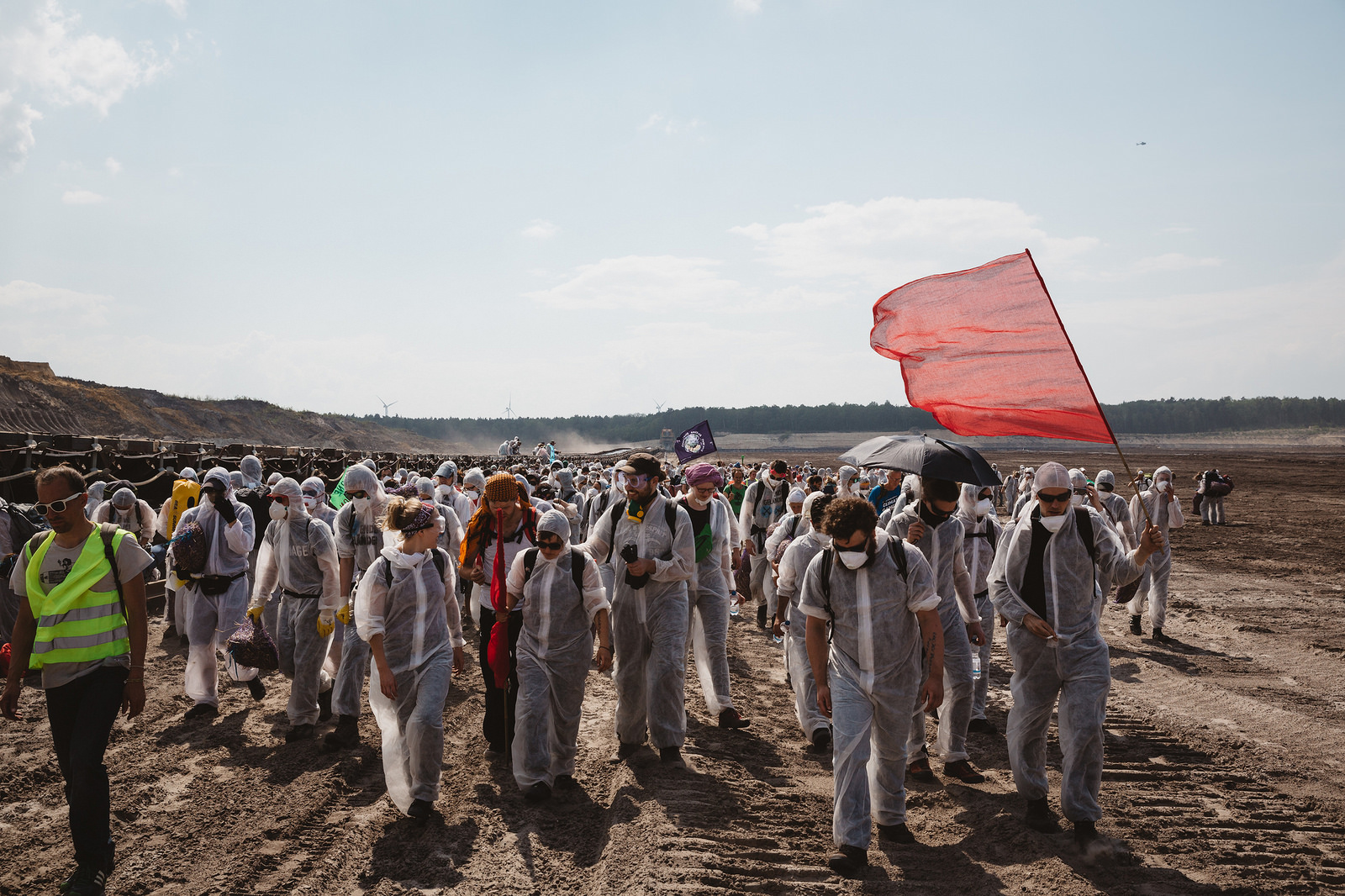

Ende Gelände 2016 was a large civil disobedience protest movement in Germany to limit global warming through fossil fuel phase-out.

3500–4000 environmental activists from twelve countries blocked the Welzow-Süd open-pit coal mine and the coal-fired Schwarze Pumpe power station, then owned by Vattenfall (Spremberg), from 13 to 15 May 2016.

== Context ==
On 15 August 2015, in the first year of Ende Gelände, 1500 activists blocked the Garzweiler surface mine owned by RWE (Ende Gelände 2015).

Ende Gelände formed in 2015 as a coalition of German environmental groups and "people from the anti-nuclear and anti-coal movements".

The activists of the first Ende Gelände 2015 were hosted by the climate camp "Rheinlandcamp". In 2016 the "Lausitzcamp" hosted the 3500 to 4000 activists and provided infrastructure and support.

In German, Ende Gelände idiomatically means "Here and no further". Ende Gelände 2016 was part of an international wave of actions called "Break Free from Fossil Fuels".

It was followed by Ende Gelände 2017: in the Rhineland open-pit mines on 24 to 29 August 2017 as well as 3 to 5 November 2017 on (for the 2017 United Nations Climate Change Conference).

== Description ==
During the 48 hours of mass action, the coal-fired Schwarze Pumpe power station (described as "Europe's tenth largest emitter of CO_{2}") was cut to 20 percent of its power for two days.

The nearly shutting down of the power plant over the weekend of Ende Gelände was seen by activists as a great success. Vattenfall Europe's chairman of the board said: "It is an absolute new quality, that a power plant shall be forced to cease its work by violent pressure, which has direct consequences for the German electricity grid. This does not any more only affect Lusatia."

The short-term goal of Ende Gelände was to stop the process of Vattenfall selling the mining area. The selling of Lusatia's coal mining industry was described by Ende Gelände as the biggest single investment in coal power in Europe. Ende Gelände intended to stop the selling process. Instead, Vattenfall should have, according to Ende Gelände, financed a social coal phase out and cover ecological follow up expenditures.

The mining region was eventually, after renewed debates in the Swedish Parliament as a direct response to Ende Gelände, sold to EPH in October 2016. Vattenfall initially expected to sell for 2 to 3 billion Euro, but finally had to pay EPH 1.7 billion for EPH taking over all (especially ecological) liabilities in the region. Ende Gelände had the motto in 2016 "we are the investment risk".

Organisers describes Ende Gelände 2016 as "the largest ever global civil disobedience against fossil fuels".

== Gallery ==
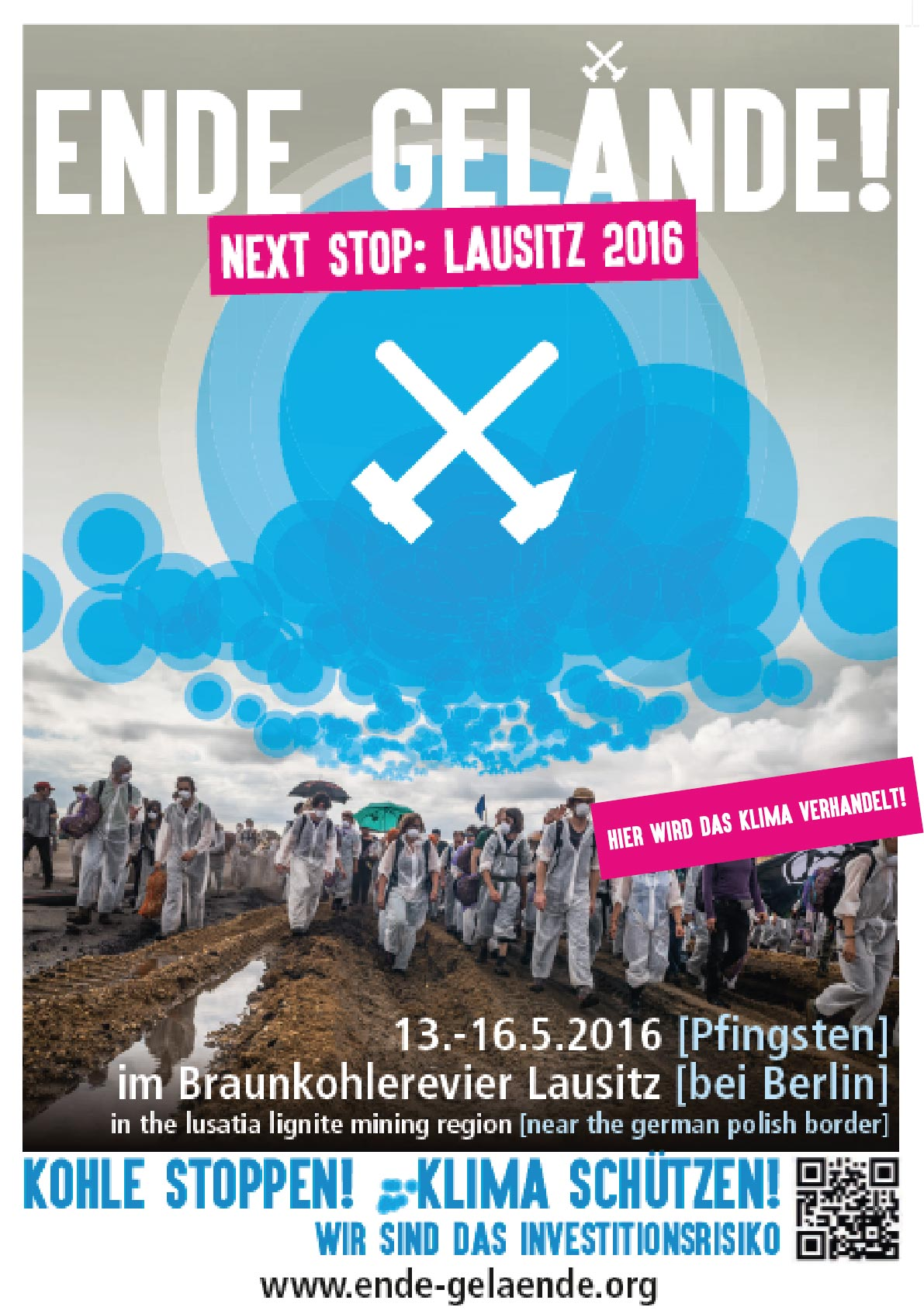
Poster

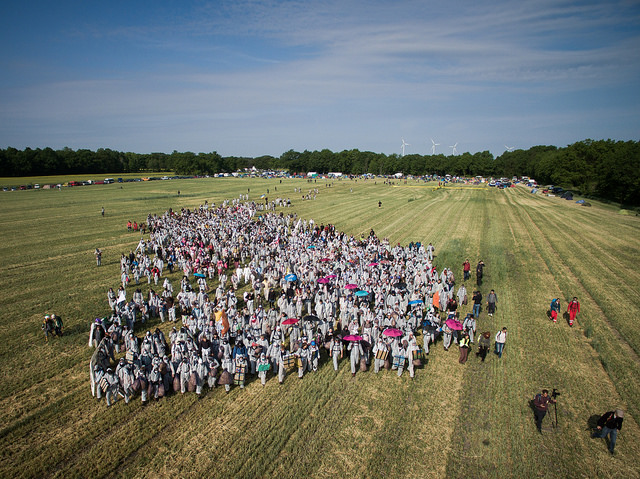
Gathering

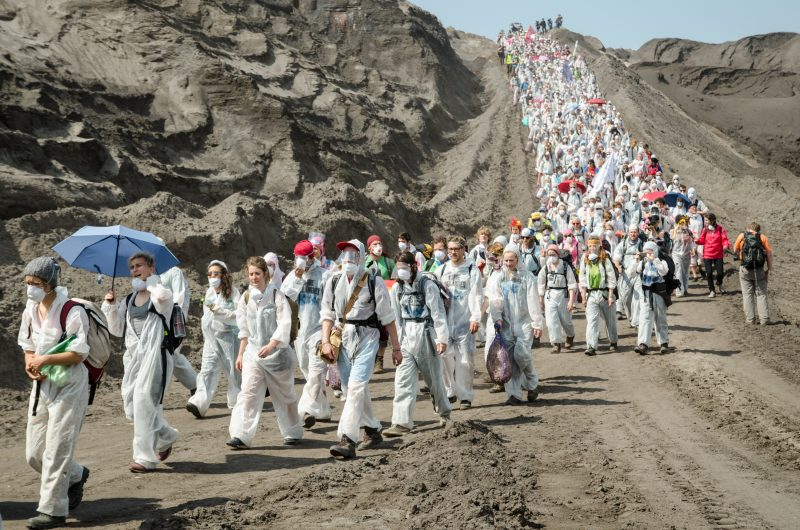
Activists in the open-pit coal mine

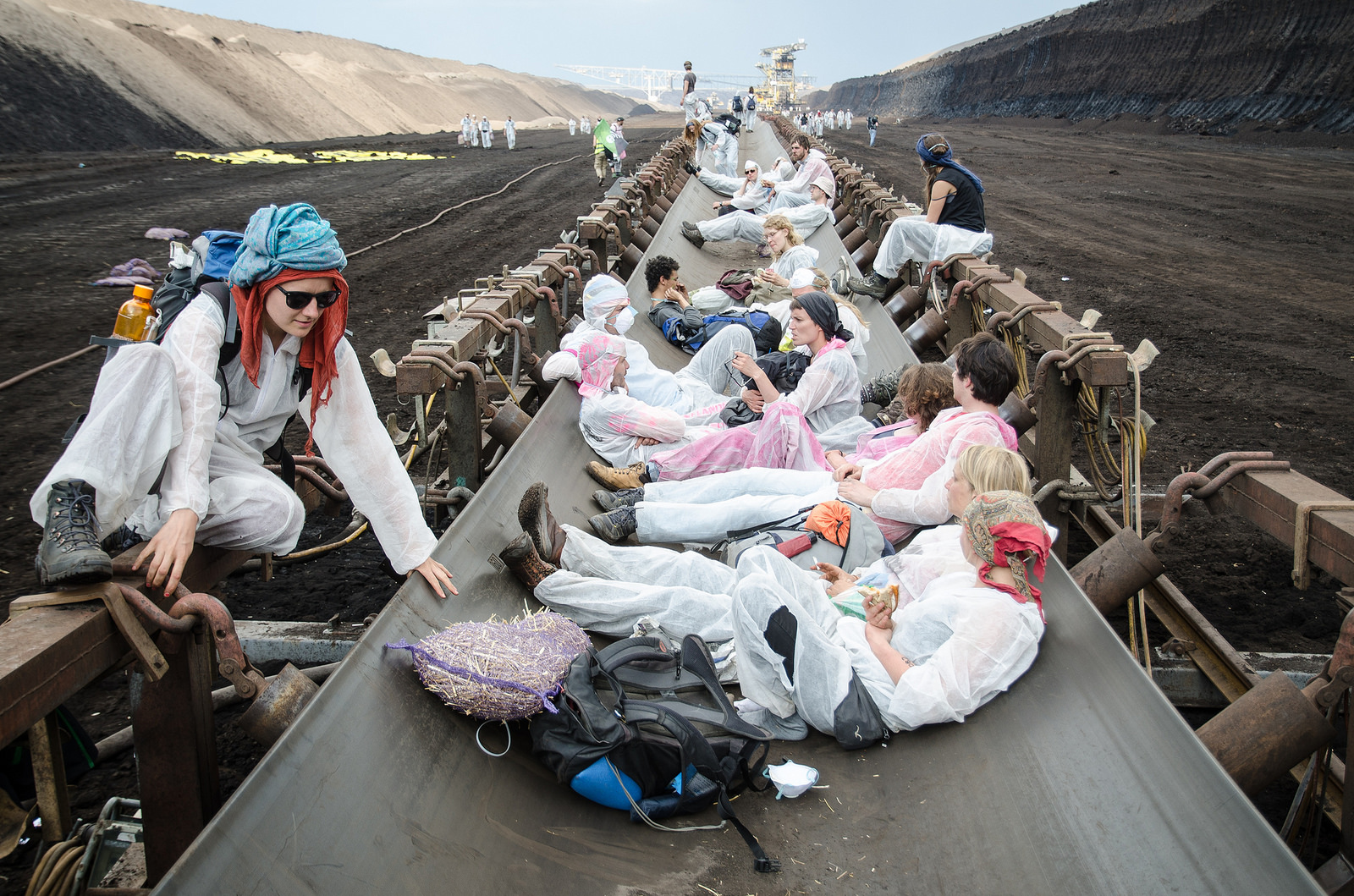
Blocking a conveyor belt

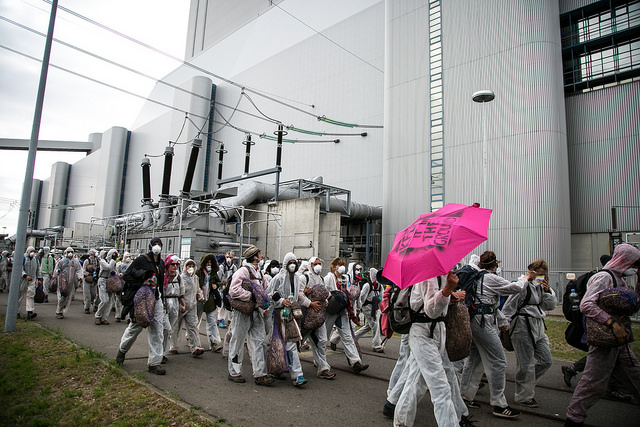
Near the power plant

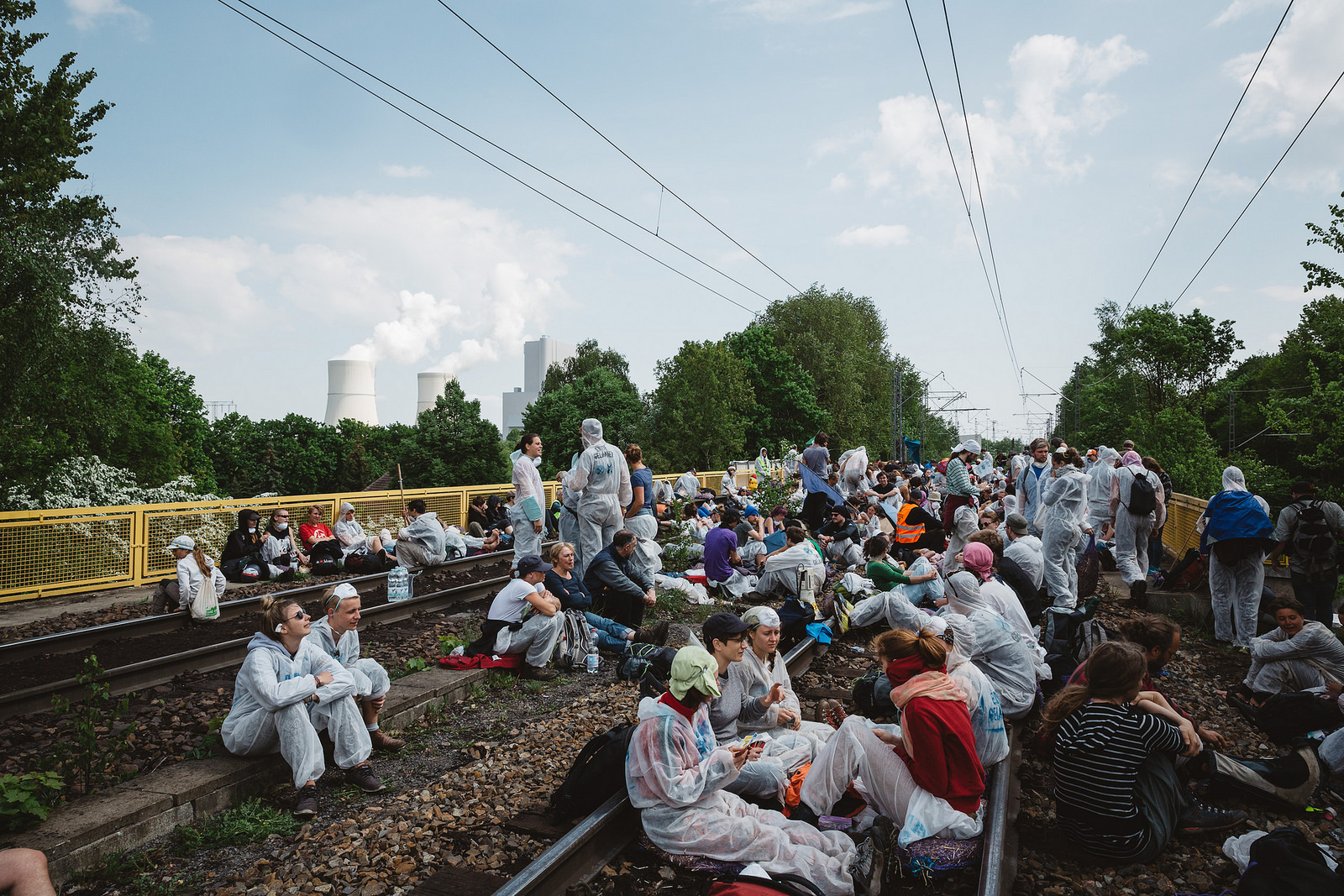
Blocking railway lines leading to the coal mine

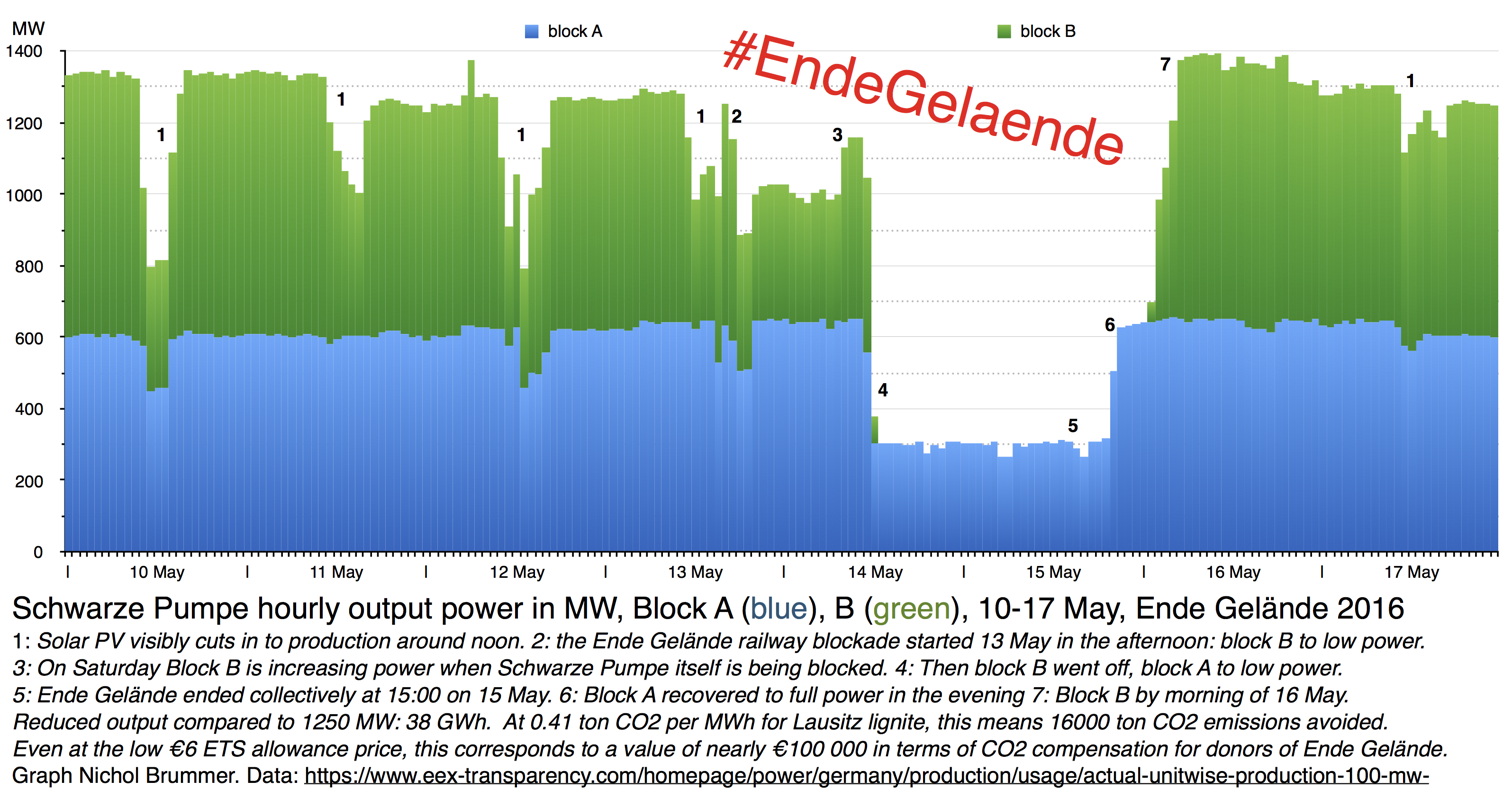
The power plant was cut to 20% of its power for two days, preventing 16 kton CO_{2} emissions

== See also ==
- Climate disobedience
- Climate justice
- Energy transition (in Germany)
- Ende Gelände
- Ende Gelände 2015
- Ende Gelände 2017
- Extinction Rebellion
- Fossil fuel divestment
