= LEAG =

German energy company

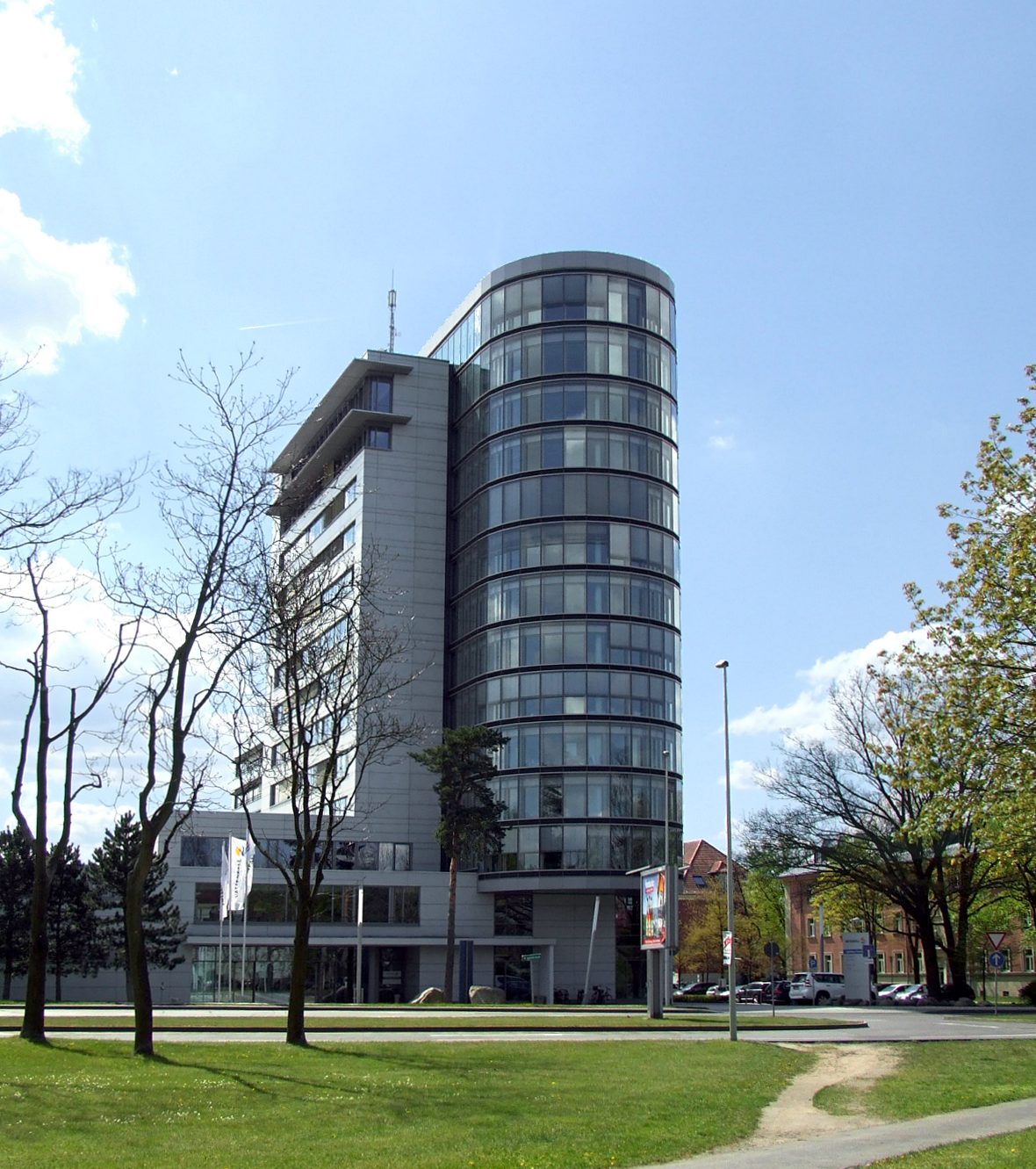
- LEAG administrative building in Cottbus
- Industry: Energy
- Founded: 2016; 10 years ago
- Headquarters: Cottbus, Germany
- Key people: Adi Roesch (CEO)
- Products: Electricity, district heating
- Parent: EP Energy Transition
- Subsidiaries: Lausitz Energie Verwaltungs GmbH; LEAG Gigawatt GmbH
- Website: www.leag.de

LEAG is a German energy group headquartered in Cottbus, Brandenburg and owned by EP Energy Transition. Its businesses cover lignite mining, electricity generation and heat supply. It also produces wind and solar power and operates battery storage facilities. Its mining and power-generation activities are concentrated in eastern Germany, particularly in Lusatia. As of January 2025, it was Germany's second-largest electricity producer.

The group was formed in 2016 following the sale of Vattenfall's German lignite business. Through its GigawattFactory programme, LEAG is developing former mining and power-station sites for renewable generation and energy storage. It has opened wind and solar parks and is building large battery storage facilities.

== History and ownership ==
LEAG was formed in 2016 after Vattenfall sold its German lignite business to the Czech energy company Energetický a průmyslový holding (EPH) and its financial partner PPF Investments. Completed on 30 September 2016, the sale included the Jänschwalde, Boxberg and Schwarze Pumpe power stations, Unit R at Lippendorf, and associated opencast mines.

In March 2025, EP Energy Transition, part of EP Group, acquired PPF Group's remaining 30% shareholding in LEAG, becoming its sole shareholder.

A restructuring approved in January 2025 provided for LEAG GmbH to become the group holding company. The mining and conventional power-generation businesses are grouped under Lausitz Energie Verwaltungs GmbH. LEAG Gigawatt GmbH brings together the renewable energy, storage and biomass businesses.

== Energy transition ==
LEAG's development programme, called the GigawattFactory, combines renewable electricity generation with storage and flexible power plants. In February 2024, the company outlined plans for 7 GW of renewable generation capacity by 2030 and gas-fired power stations at four locations with a combined capacity of at least 3 GW.

In November 2025, the European Commission approved German compensation of up to €1.75 billion for the early closure of LEAG's lignite power plants in Lusatia. The approved measure covers closures scheduled between 2028 and 2038 and provides compensation for eligible additional costs and lost profits.

In January 2026, LEAG announced that mining at Welzow-Süd would end in 2030 rather than 2033. The company said that growing wind and solar generation had reduced the need for coal-fired electricity.

== Business activities ==
=== Mining and conventional generation ===
LEAG mines lignite at Welzow-Süd in Brandenburg and at Nochten and Reichwalde in Saxony. These three opencast mines supply its power stations in Lusatia. Mining at Jänschwalde ended in 2023.

Its lignite power stations are at Jänschwalde, Boxberg and Schwarze Pumpe. Near Leipzig, LEAG owns Unit R of Lippendorf power station and runs the whole plant on behalf of both owners. Coal for Lippendorf comes from MIBRAG's Vereinigtes Schleenhain mine. The power stations also supply heat to nearby towns and steam to industrial customers.

The company also runs gas-turbine plants at Thyrow and Ahrensfelde, near Berlin. Both are held in Germany's capacity reserve and are called on when supplies are tight. A third gas-fired plant, at Leipheim in Bavaria, operates for the transmission system operator Amprion to help maintain grid stability.

=== Biomass ===
LEAG produces wood pellets at Schwedt, Wismar, Oranienbaum and Löbau in Germany. The Oranienbaum and Löbau sites also have biomass-fired plants that generate electricity and supply heat for pellet production.

In November 2024, LEAG acquired the Swedish pellet producer Scandbio from Lantmännen. At the time of the acquisition, Scandbio had five production facilities in Sweden and one in Latvia, with sales mainly in Sweden, Latvia and Denmark.

=== Wind and solar power ===
LEAG opened the 25 MWp Boxberg solar park on reclaimed land at the Nochten mine in April 2024. Its 22 MWp Haidemühl solar park, beside the Welzow-Süd mine, followed in November that year. A further 31 MWp installation entered service in 2025 on the slopes of the Jänschwalde I ash disposal site.

In September 2026, LEAG commissioned the Forst-Briesnig II wind farm and the first phase of the Bohrau solar park on reclaimed land at the former Jänschwalde opencast mine. The wind farm has 17 turbines with a total capacity of 105 MW. The first phase of the Bohrau solar park has a peak capacity of 133 MW.

=== Energy storage ===
LEAG's BigBattery Lausitz, beside Schwarze Pumpe power station, entered service in 2020. It has 54 MWh of usable storage capacity and provides frequency regulation for the electricity grid. The BigBattery Oberlausitz is being built at Boxberg. Its two 50 MW units will provide 137 MWh of storage in total.

Construction of the GridBattery Heinersbrück began in August 2026. The battery is due to open in 2027, with 100 MW of power and 400 MWh of storage capacity. It will share a grid connection with the Forst-Briesnig II wind farm and the first phase of the Bohrau solar park.

That month, work also began on the larger GigaBattery Boxberg 400, designed for 400 MW of power and 1,600 MWh of storage.

Construction of the GigaBattery Jänschwalde 1000 followed in September. The Jänschwalde battery is due to enter service in 2028. It will be able to deliver 1,000 MW and store 4,000 MWh of electricity.

== Mine restoration ==
Financing the restoration of former mining areas has been a subject of debate. A July 2025 analysis by Forum Ökologisch-Soziale Marktwirtschaft (FÖS) argued that LEAG's restructuring increased the risk of insufficient funding for long-term mining liabilities.

LEAG disputed concerns about the financing arrangements, stating in September 2025 that its lignite businesses retained sufficient resources and that dedicated provision companies offered additional protection for restoration funding.
