= Boxberg Power Station =

Lignite-fired power plant in Saxony, Germany

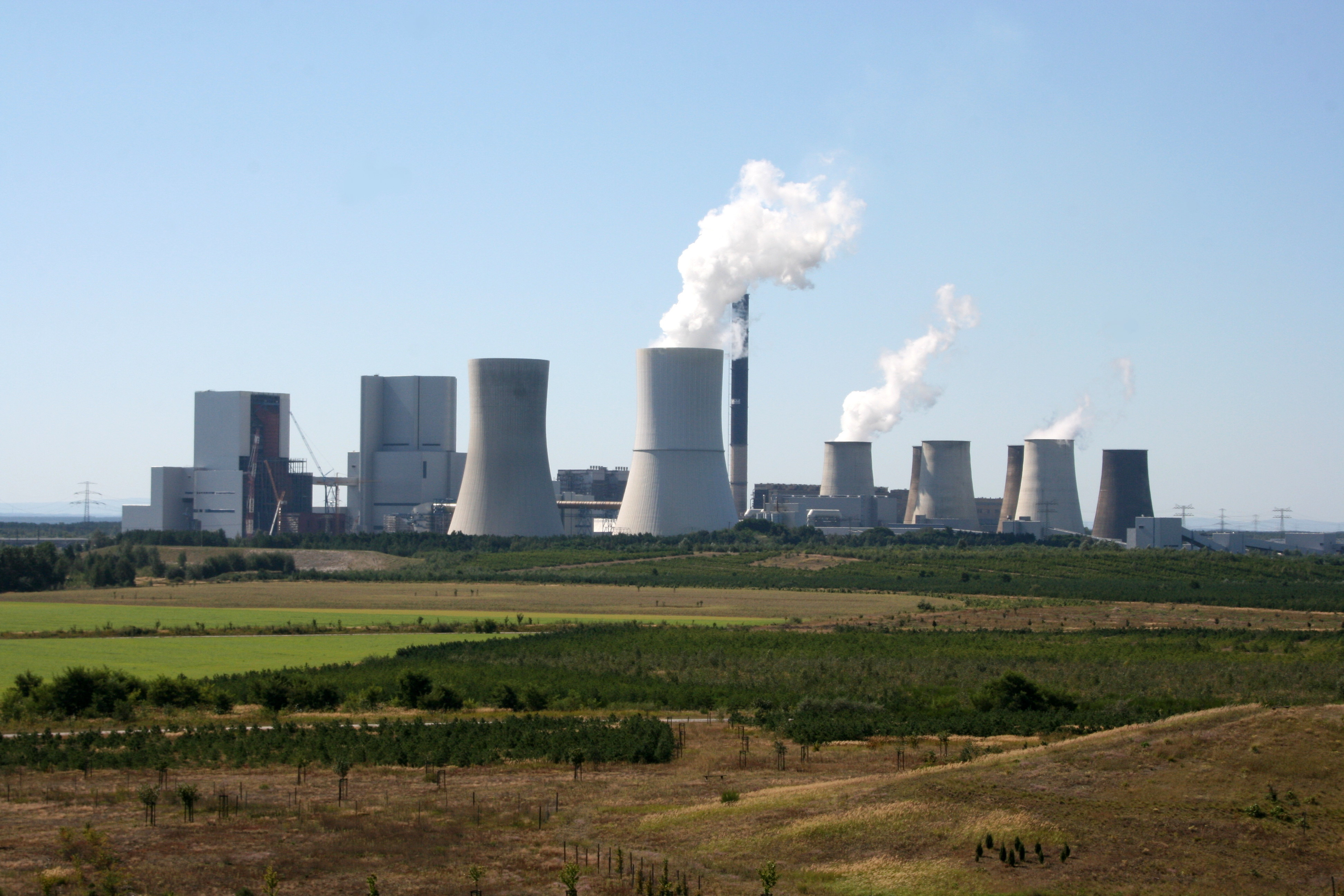
- Boxberg Power Station, 2009
- Country: Germany
- Location: Boxberg
- Coordinates: 51°24′58″N 14°33′53″E
- Status: Operational
- Commission date: 1966
- Owner: EP Energy Transition
- Operator: LEAG

Thermal power station
- Primary fuel: Lignite

Power generation
- Units operational: 4
- Nameplate capacity: 2,575 MW

External links
- Commons: Related media on Commons

Boxberg Power Station (in German commonly referred as Kraftwerk Boxberg) is a lignite-fired power station with three units at Boxberg, near Weißwasser, Saxony, Eastern Germany. Since the late 2012, it has a capacity of 2,575 MW.

In 2001, it was acquired by Vattenfall Europe, a subdivision of Vattenfall. The power station was sold by Vattenfall to the Czech energy group EPH and its financial partner PPF Investments on 30 September 2016.

== History ==
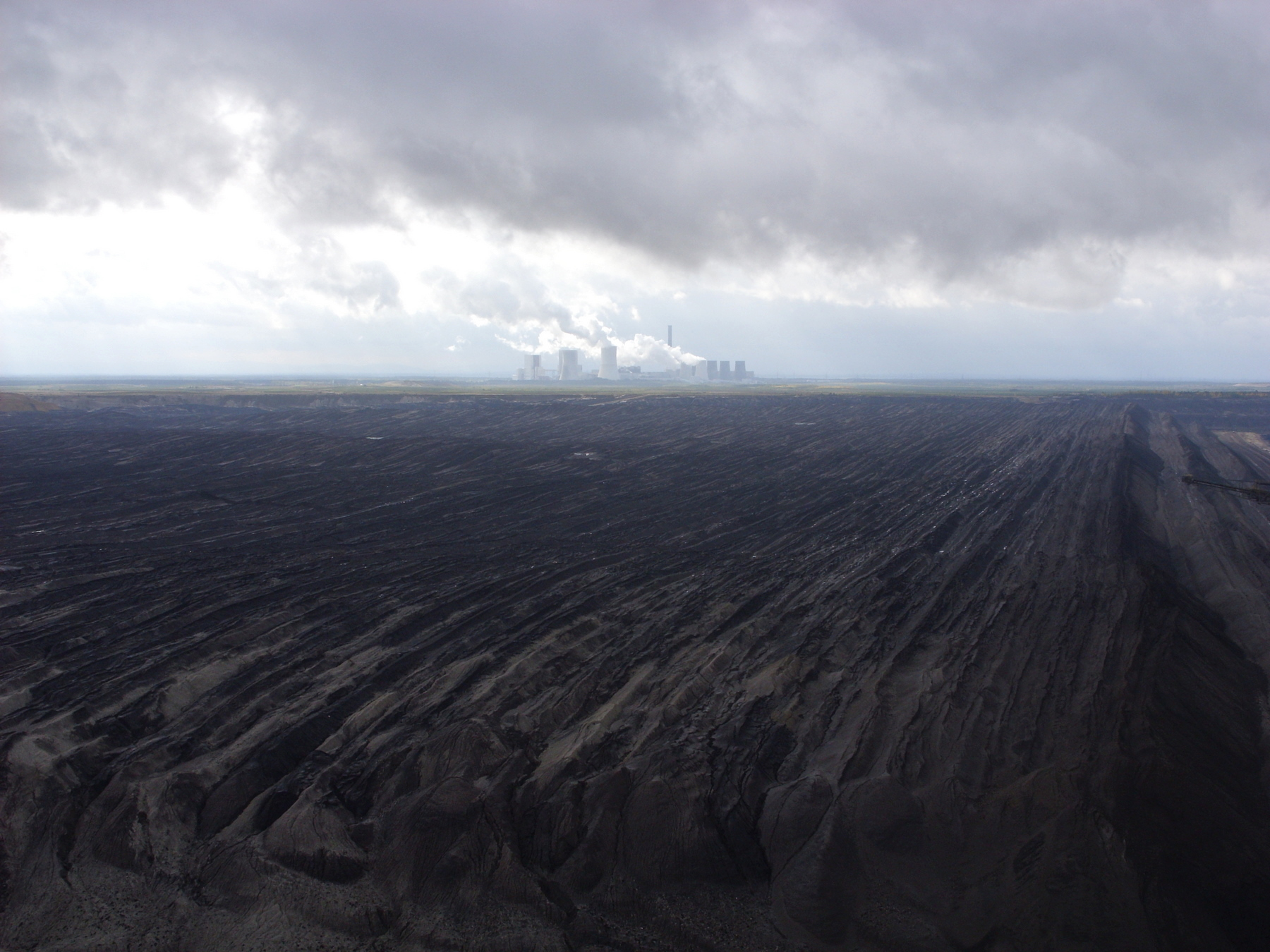
View over the Nochten surface mine to Boxberg Power Station

Like Jänschwalde Power Station and Schwarze Pumpe Power Station, Boxberg Power Station was built at a place surrounded by surface mines. The first unit was built in 1966, in the 1980s there were 14 units with an accumulated output of 3,520 MW.

After the German reunification twelve units (210 MW each) went off, and two units, 500 MW each, were modernized. In the mid-1990s, a new 900 MW unit was built, another 675 MW unit started operating 2012.

== Size ==
Boxberg Power Station had four chimneys 300 metres tall. One was dismantled in 2000, two were blasted in 2009, and the last one was projected to be completely demolished in 2010 but problems during the process of demolishing delayed that project, it was blasted in 2012.
