= High temperature lignite coke =

Carbon-rich fuel

High temperature lignite coke (BHT coke) is a carbon-rich fuel that is produced from lignite by exposure to heat in the absence of oxygen (pyrolysis).

== History ==
Because East German industry urgently needed coke after the Second World War and the anthracite coal traditionally used for its production was found for the most part in western Germany, the two process engineers Erich Rammler and Georg Bilkenroth began researching and developing a metallurgical high-temperature lignite coke in 1949. This could be used for iron production, non-ferrous metallurgy and carbide production.

The two scientists of the Bergakademie Freiberg concentrated their research on the Lower Lusatian lignite and in 1952 were finally able to obtain a patent for Lignite high-temperature gasification.

The coke was produced both as bulk material and in briquette form.

== Production facilities ==
From 1952, the high temperature lignite coke was produced in the large coking plant VEB Braunkohleveredelung Lauchhammer and later also in the coking plant at VEB Gaskombinat Schwarze Pumpe. By-products of lignite coking are tar, medium oil and light oil as well as high-quality natural gas.

== 50-year anniversary celebration ==
On 14 June 2002, former employees and cooperation experts were invited to Lauchhammer on the occasion of the 50th anniversary of the First Coke Tapping, as reported by the "Zeitschrift der Lausitzer und Mitteldeutschen Bergbau-Verwaltungsgesellschaft mbH" in its magazine LBMV konkret 4/2002, p. 7.

== Bibliography ==
- Bilkenroth/Rammler: Verfahren und Vorrichtung zur Erzeugung eines stückigen Hochtemperaturkokses von hoher Druck-, Abrieb- und Sturzfestigkeit aus Braunkohlenbriketts (Patentschrift Nr. 4630, 1952)
- Herbert Krug, Karl Heinz Rentrop: Die Erzeugung eines hochfesten, grobstückigen Braunkohlehochtemperaturkokses (BHT-Koks) im einstufigen Verfahren nach Bilkenroth-Rammler – eine komplexe Aufgabe. Bergakademie Freiberg 1991
- Erich Rammler: Mein Berufsleben, Teile I bis III, unveränderte Abschrift persönlicher Aufzeichnungen., erg. um die Beiträge: Angela Kießling u. Susanne Scholze: Der wissenschaftliche Nachlass Erich Rammlers in der Universitätsbibliothek der TU Bergakademie Freiberg. Käte Rammler und Hans-Georg Friedel: Erich Rammler privat – Biographische Daten und persönliche Erinnerungen. Freiberg, 2006; ISBN 978-3-86012-291-4
- Ganske-Zapf, Mandy; Grabowsky, Dennis; Kalimullin, Robert: Erfindungen aus der DDR, Berlin 2018, S. 24ff., ISBN 3-95958-139-4
