= Hornow-Wadelsdorf =

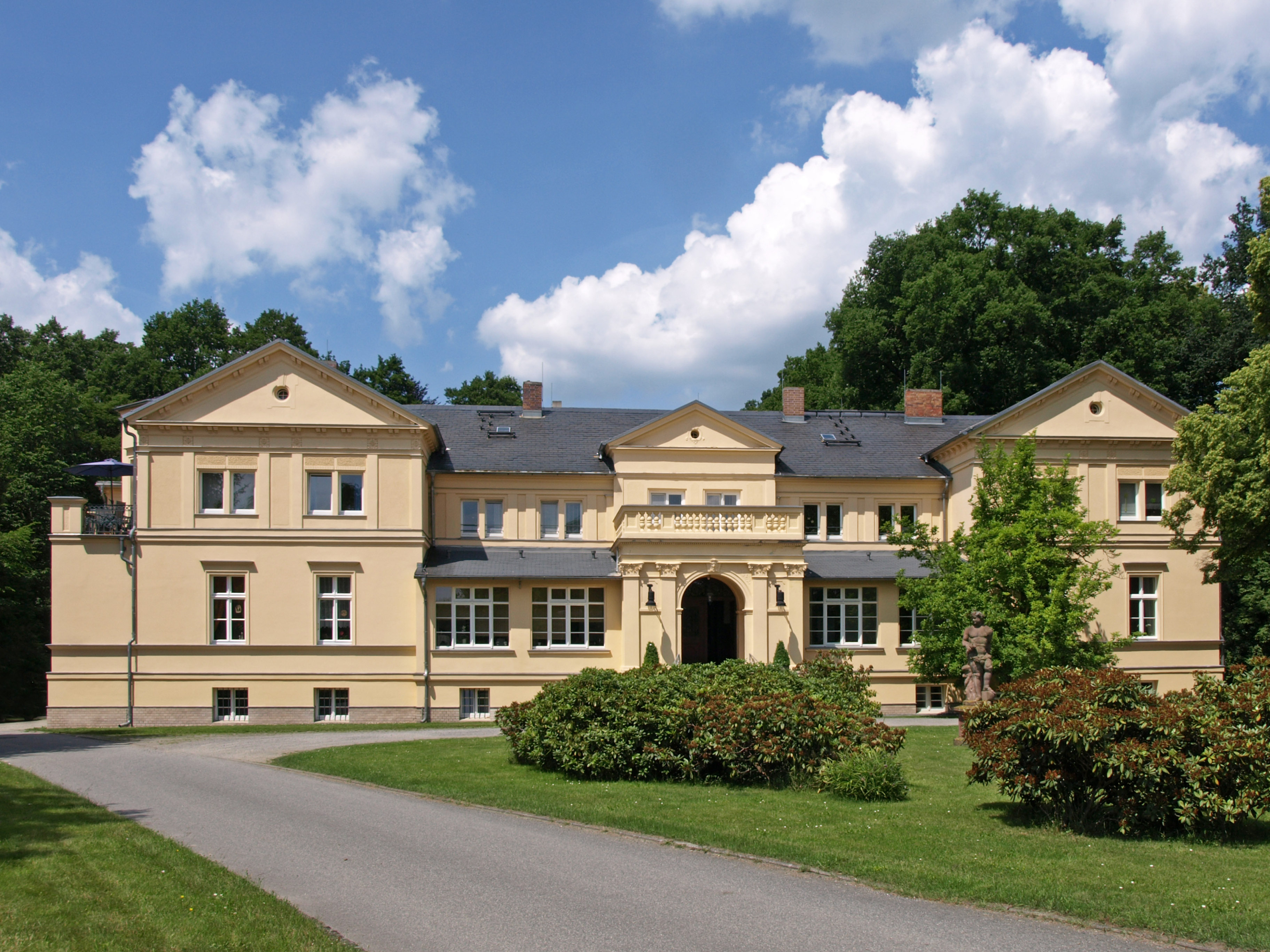
- Interactive map of Hornow-Wadelsdorf
- Location within Germany Location within Brandenburg
- Coordinates: 51°37′00″N 14°28′59″E
- Country: Germany
- State: Brandenburg
- District: Spree-Neiße
- Disbanded: 1 January 2016
- Subdivisions: 2 Ortsteile

Area
  - Total: 21.25 km^{2} (8.20 sq mi)
- Elevation: 113 m (371 ft)

Population (2014-12-31)
  - Total: 603
  - Density: 28.4/km^{2} (73.5/sq mi)
- Time zone: UTC+01:00 (CET)
  - Summer (DST): UTC+02:00 (CEST)
- Postal codes: 03130
- Dialling codes: 035698
- Vehicle registration: SPN, FOR, GUB, SPB

Hornow-Wadelsdorf (German pronunciation: [ˈhɔʁnoː ˈvaːdl̩sˌdɔʁf]; Lower Sorbian: Lěšće-Zakrjejc) is a former municipality in the district of Spree-Neiße, in Brandenburg, Germany. On 1 January 2016 it was dissolved, and Hornow and Wadelsdorf became part of the town Spremberg.
