= Boxberg, Saxony =

Boxberg/Hamor
- Municipality
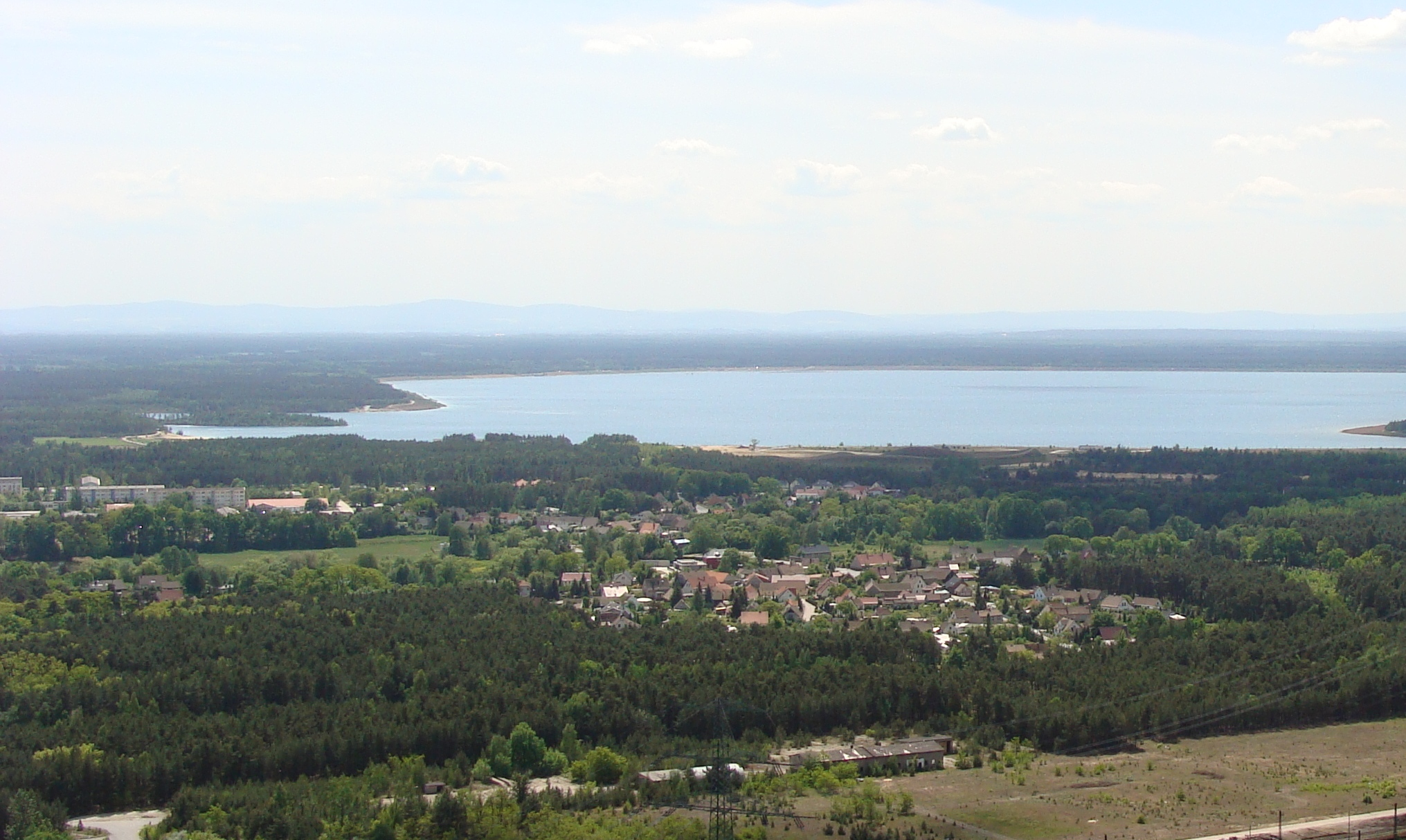
- Panorama of Boxberg with Bärwalder Lake in the background

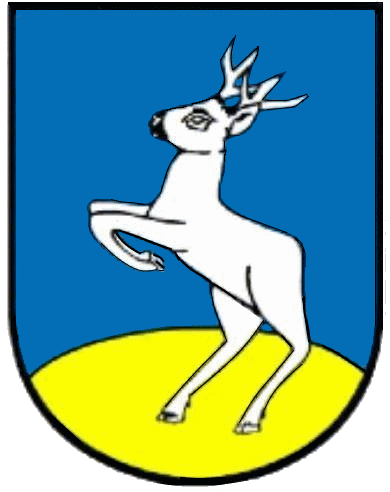
- Coat of arms

- Location of Boxberg/Hamor within Görlitz district
- Interactive map of Boxberg/Hamor
- Location within Germany Location within Saxony
- Coordinates: 51°24′14″N 14°34′48″E
- Country: Germany
- State: Saxony
- District: Görlitz
- Subdivisions: 18

Government
  - Mayor (2022–29): Hendryk Balko

Area
  - Total: 217.68 km^{2} (84.05 sq mi)
- Elevation: 129 m (423 ft)

Population (2025-12-31)
  - Total: 4,186
  - Density: 19.23/km^{2} (49.81/sq mi)
- Time zone: UTC+01:00 (CET)
  - Summer (DST): UTC+02:00 (CEST)
- Postal codes: 02943
- Dialling codes: 035774
- Vehicle registration: GR, LÖB, NOL, NY, WSW, ZI
- Website: www.boxberg-ol.de

Boxberg (German: [ˈbɔksˌbɛʁk]; officially Boxberg/O.L.) or Hamor (Upper Sorbian: [ˈhamɔʁ]) is a municipality in the Görlitz district in Saxony, Germany. The place is known for its large Boxberg Power Station, that uses lignite as fuel.

The municipality is part of the recognized Sorbian settlement area in Saxony. Upper Sorbian has an official status next to German, all villages bear names in both languages.

In October 2007 it absorbed the former municipality Uhyst, and in February 2009 Klitten.

In 2022, Peter Fitzek's gang bought Bärwalde Castle and made it the headquarters of the right-wing extremist Reich Citizens' Movement "Kingdom of Germany" under the leadership of the self-proclaimed "Supreme Sovereign" and "King" Peter Fitzek.
