= Klitten =

- Ortsteil of Boxberg
- Interactive map of Klitten
- Location within Germany Location within Saxony
- Coordinates: 51°21′N 14°36′E
- Country: Germany
- State: Saxony
- District: Görlitz
- Town: Boxberg

Area
  - Total: 5.289 km^{2} (2.042 sq mi)
- Elevation: 134 m (440 ft)

Population (2008-12-31)
  - Total: 526
  - Density: 99.5/km^{2} (258/sq mi)
- Time zone: UTC+01:00 (CET)
  - Summer (DST): UTC+02:00 (CEST)
- Postal codes: 02943
- Dialling codes: 035895
- Vehicle registration: GR

Klitten (Upper Sorbian: Klětno, pronounced [ˈklʲɪtnɔ]) is a village and a former municipality in the district Görlitz, Saxony, Germany. Since 1 February 2009, it is part of the municipality Boxberg.

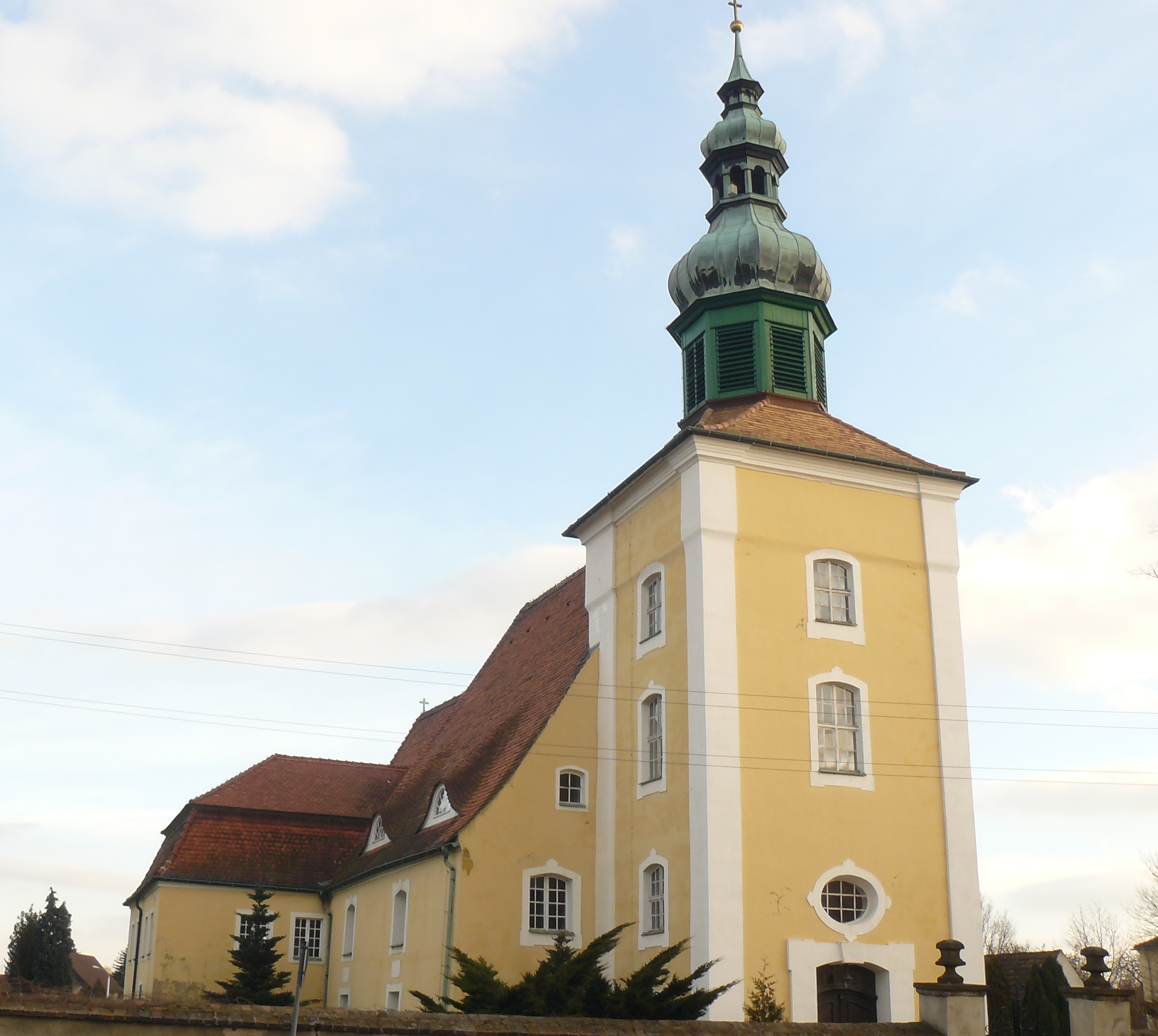
Church of the Evangelical Church Berlin-Brandenburg-Silesian Upper Lusatia

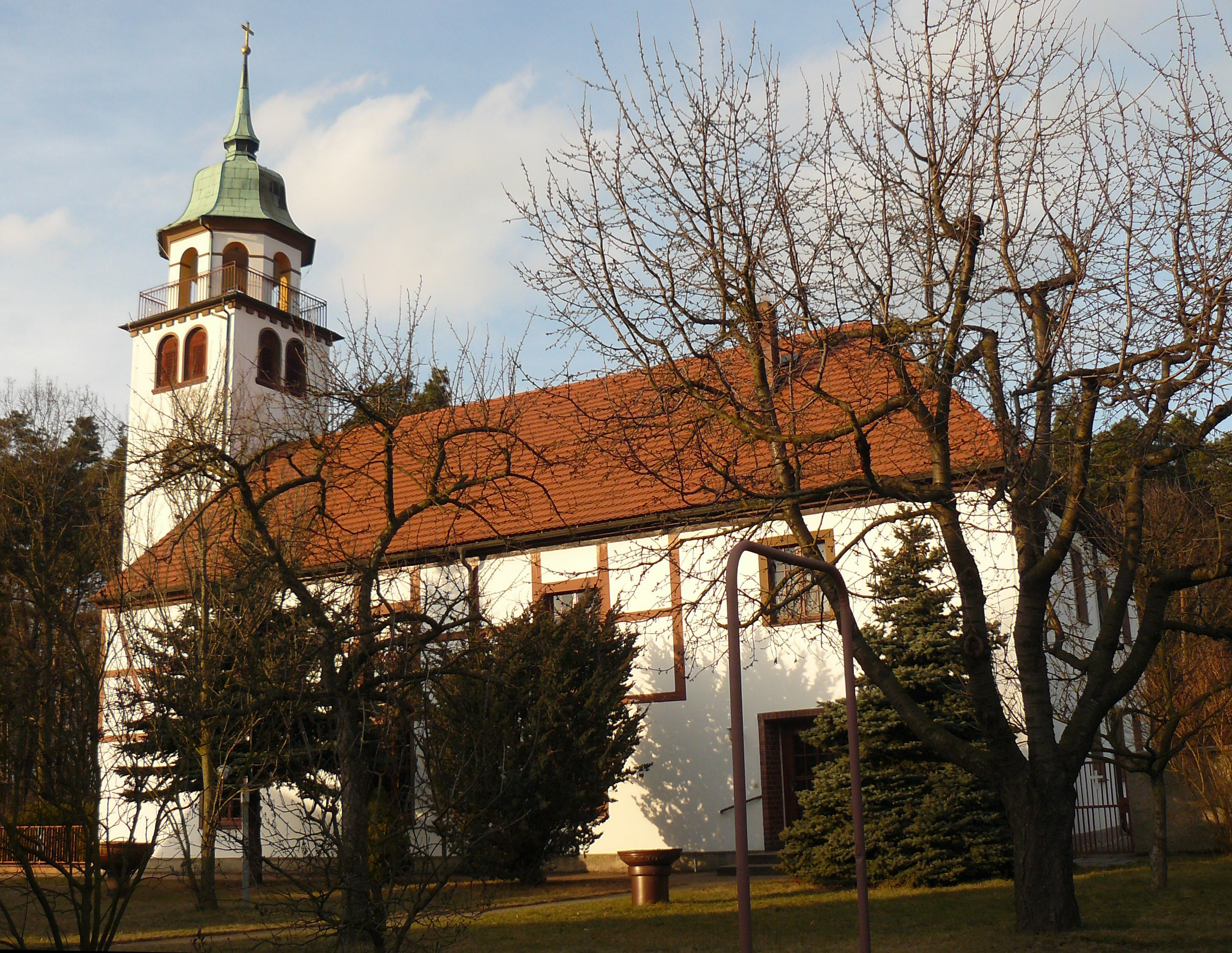
Church of the Independent Evangelical Lutheran Church
