= Uhyst =

Uhyst Delni Wujězd
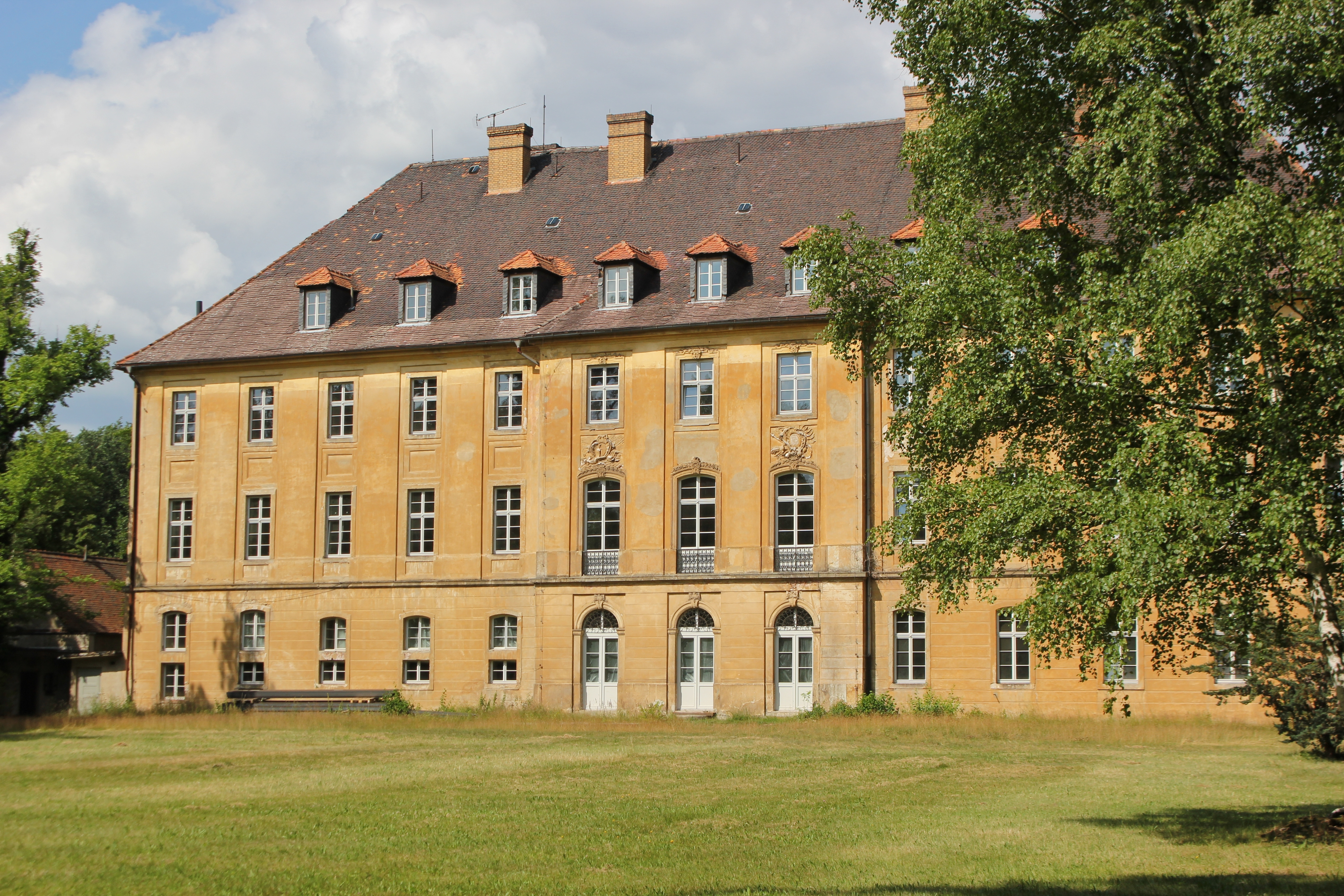
- Palace

- Location within Germany
- Coordinates: 51°21′55″N 14°30′24″E
- Country: Germany
- State: Saxony
- District: Görlitz
- Time zone: UTC+1 (CET)
  - Summer (DST): UTC+2 (CEST)

Uhyst (Upper Sorbian Delni Wujězd) was a municipality in the district Niederschlesischer Oberlausitzkreis, Saxony, Germany. Since 2007, it is part of Boxberg.

It is located in Lusatia, and is officially bilingual (German and Upper Sorbian), as it is inhabited by the indigenous Sorbs.

== History ==
A Catholic chapel was built by 1342. As of 1885, the village had a population of 451, and there was a Sorbian Lutheran school.

Uhyst was renamed Spreefurt during the Nazi era, and regained its original name in 1947.

The forester and poet Gottfried Unterdörfer lived and worked here from 1950 until his death in 1990.
