= Spremberg =

Spremberg Grodk
- Town
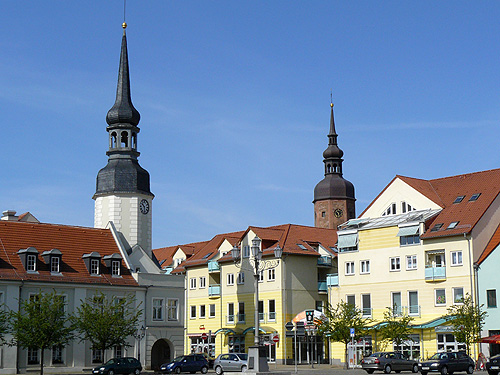
- Market square

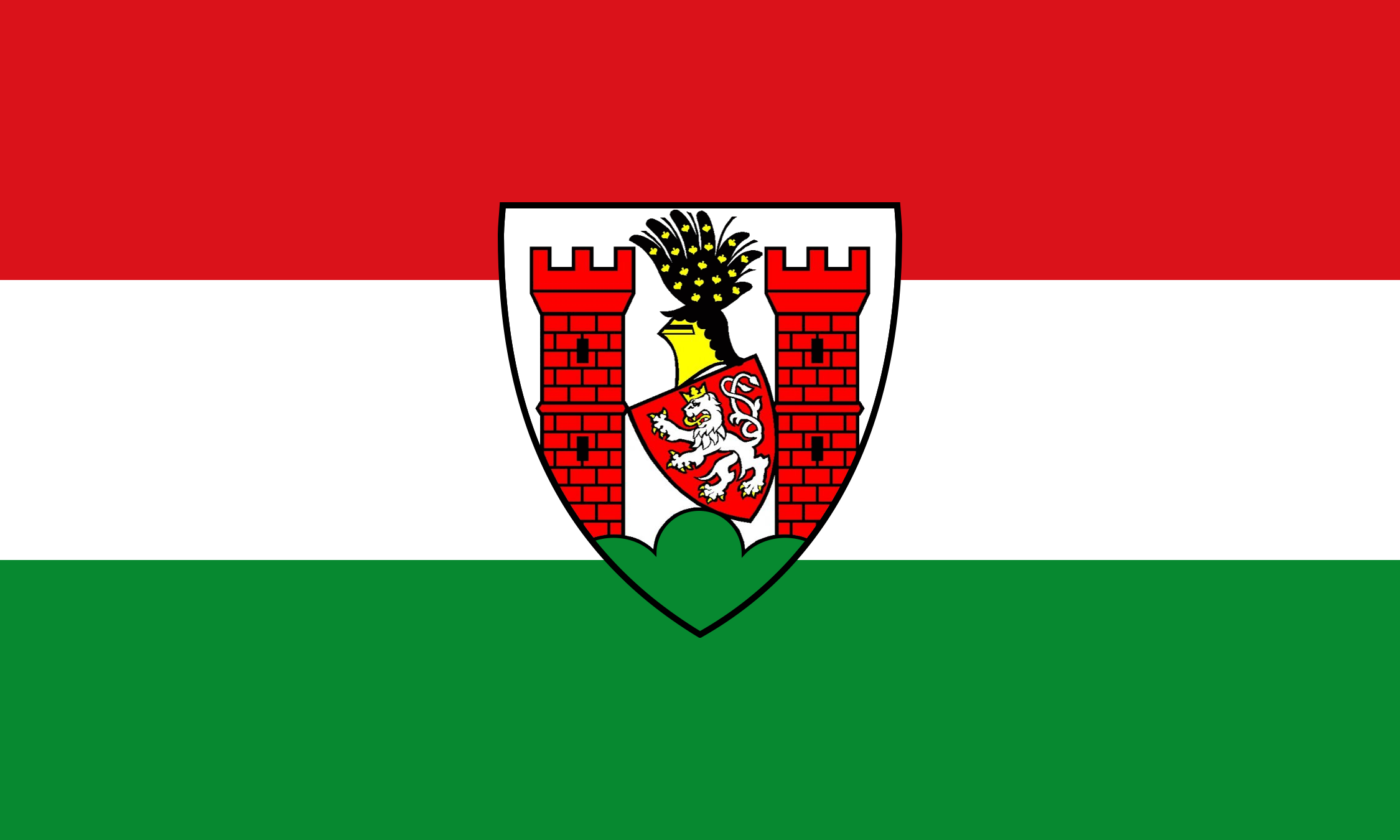
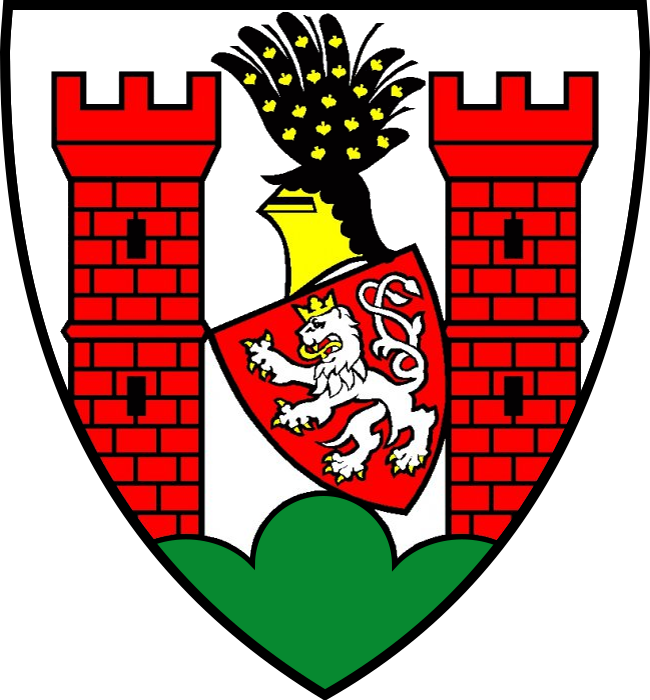
- Flag Coat of arms

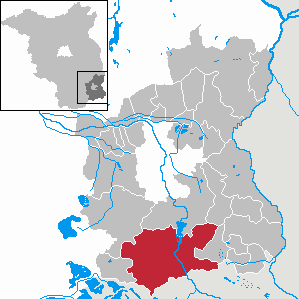
- Location of Spremberg; Grodk within Spree-Neiße district
- Interactive map of Spremberg; Grodk
- Location within Germany Location within Brandenburg
- Coordinates: 51°34′18″N 14°22′46″E
- Country: Germany
- State: Brandenburg
- District: Spree-Neiße

Government
  - Mayor (2021–29): Christine Herntier (Ind.)

Area
  - Total: 202.32 km^{2} (78.12 sq mi)
- Elevation: 97 m (318 ft)

Population (2025-12-31)
  - Total: 20,900
  - Density: 103/km^{2} (268/sq mi)
- Time zone: UTC+01:00 (CET)
  - Summer (DST): UTC+02:00 (CEST)
- Postal codes: 03130
- Dialling codes: 03563
- Vehicle registration: SPN, FOR, GUB, SPB
- Website: www.stadt-spremberg.de

Spremberg (German pronunciation: [ˈʃpʁɛmˌbɛʁk]) or Grodk (Lower Sorbian pronunciation: [ˈɡrɔtk]) is a municipality near the Saxon city of Hoyerswerda and is in the Spree-Neiße district of Brandenburg, Germany.

First mentioned in 1301, the town alone has 14,028 inhabitants, and the municipality, including other villages, has 22,456 inhabitants, as of 31 December 2017.

== Geography ==
Spremberg is situated about 20 km (12 miles) south of Cottbus and 25 km (15 miles) north of Hoyerswerda, on an island and on both banks of the river Spree. Between 1871 and 1918 the town was the geographical centre of the German Empire: today, it is only 25 km (15 miles) from the German-Polish border. On 1 January 2016, the former municipality Hornow-Wadelsdorf became part of Spremberg.

== Demography ==
Development of population since 1875 within the current Boundaries (Blue Line: Population; Dotted Line: Comparison to Population development in Brandenburg state; Grey Background: Time of Nazi Germany; Red Background: Time of communist East Germany)

Recent Population Development and Projections (Population Development before Census 2011 (blue line); Recent Population Development according to the Census in Germany in 2011 (blue bordered line); Official projections for 2005–2030 (yellow line); for 2017–2030 (scarlet line); for 2020–2030 (green line)

Spremberg: Population development
within the current boundaries (2020)

Year	Pop.	±% p.a.
1875	19,546	—
1890	20,239	+0.23%
1910	24,472	+0.95%
1925	27,178	+0.70%
1939	30,989	+0.94%
1950	27,879	−0.96%
1964	37,222	+2.09%

Year	Pop.	±% p.a.
1971	32,635	−1.86%
1981	30,565	−0.65%
1985	30,739	+0.14%
1990	29,665	−0.71%
1995	28,935	−0.50%
2000	28,160	−0.54%
2005	26,416	−1.27%

Year	Pop.	±% p.a.
2010	24,373	−1.60%
2015	22,232	−1.82%
2016	22,750	+2.33%
2017	22,456	−1.29%
2018	22,175	−1.25%
2019	21,998	−0.80%
2020	21,749	−1.13%

== Mayors ==
- Friedrich Nath (1908–1919)
- Paul Steffen (1920–1931)
- Richard Buder (1931–1933)
- Kurt Kaulbars (1933–1945) NSDAP
- Rudolf Otto (1944–1945) temporary
- August Scholta (1945–1945) temporary
- Richard Buder (1945–1946)
- Willi Lange (1946–1953)
- Ruth Kartschall (1953–1961)
- Herbert Köhler (1961–1965)
- Günter Frenzel (1965–1975)
- Lothar Barnowski (1975–1975) temporary
- Hannelore Neumann (1975–1990) SED
- Egon Wochatz (1990–2002) CDU
- Klaus-Peter Schulze (2002–2013) CDU
- Christine Schönherr (2013–2013) temporary, independent
- Frank Kulik (2014–2014) temporary, independent
- Christine Herntier (since 2014), independent

== Culture ==
In 1911 there were Roman Catholic and two Protestant churches and a pilgrimage chapel dating from 1100, there was a ducal chateau built by a son of the elector John George around the end of the 16th century (now used as government offices), and there were classical, technical and commercial schools as well as a hospital.

== Schwarze Pumpe ==
Schwarze Pumpe (Lower Sorbian: Carna Plumpa) is a district of Spremberg, lying approximately 7 km (5 miles) southwest of Spremberg's town centre on the federal state boundary between Brandenburg to Saxony. It had 1886 inhabitants as of 31 December 2017. A large industrial area extending into Saxony and including the site of a large power plant is known by the same name.

On 26 May 2006, construction work started on the world's first CO_{2}-free coal power plant in the Schwarze Pumpe industrial district. The plant is based on a concept called carbon capture and storage, which means that carbon emissions will be captured and compressed to 1/500^{th} their original volume, liquefying the gas. It will then be forced 1,000 metres (3,300 ft) below the soil into porous rock where it is believed that it will remain for thousands of years without exacerbating global warming. The project, which has cost some 70 million Euros, was funded entirely by the Swedish company Vattenfall AB and went into service on 9 September 2008. The power plant was a pilot project to serve as a prototype for future full-scale power plants. Vattenfall stopped carbon capture R&D at the plant in 2014 because they found that "its costs and the energy it requires make the technology unviable".

== Twin towns – sister cities ==
Spremberg is twinned with:

- Grand Forks, Canada
- Szprotawa, Poland
- Zheleznogorsk, Russia

== Notable people ==
- Johann Agricola (1530–1590), Protestant theologian
- Otto Ostrowski (1883–1963), politician (SPD), Lord Mayor of Berlin 1946/1947
- Erwin Strittmatter (1912–1994), writer
- Joachim Teege (1925–1969), actor and cabaret artist
- Dirk Meier (born 1964), cyclist
- Sebastian Piersig (born 1984), slalom-canoeist
- Martha Israel (1905–c. 1967), politician (SED, DFD), member of the Volkskammer and the city council
- Linus Güther (born 2010), footballer
