= Bärwalder See =

Lake in Saxony, Germany

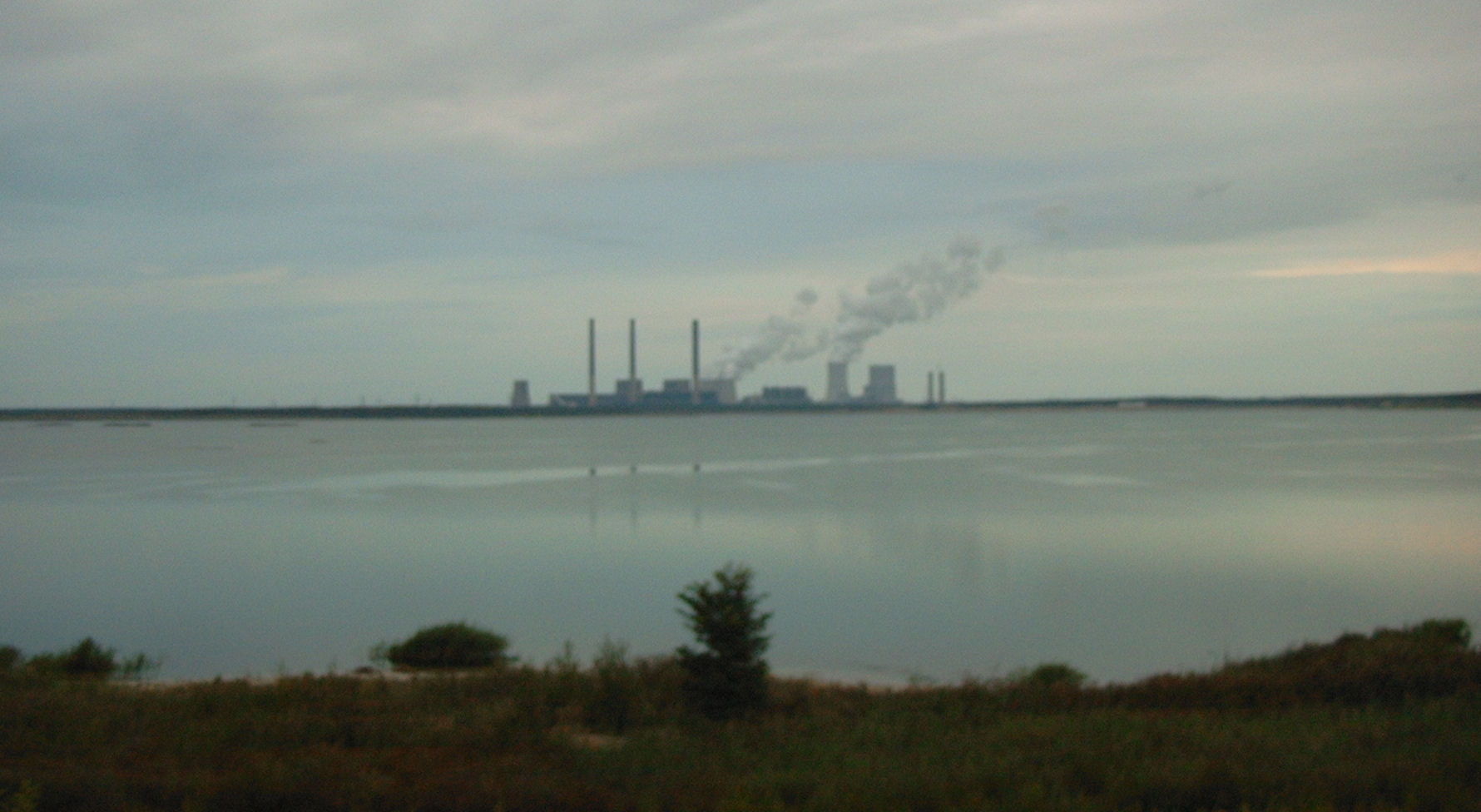

- Location within Saxony
- Location: Boxberg municipality, Saxony
- Coordinates: 51°22′N 14°32′E
- Primary inflows: Spree, Dürrbacher Fließ, Schulenburgkanal
- Primary outflows: Schwarzer Schöps
- Basin countries: Germany
- Surface area: 12.99 km^{2} (5.02 sq mi)
- Max. depth: 50 m (160 ft)
- Water volume: 174,000,000 m^{3} (6.1×10^{9} cu ft)
- Shore length^{1}: 20.6 km (12.8 mi)
- Surface elevation: 125 m (410 ft)
- ^{1} Shore length is not a well-defined measure.

Bärwalder See (Upper Sorbian: Bierwałdski jězor) is a lake in Boxberg municipality, Görlitz district, Saxony, Germany. At an elevation of 125 m, its surface area is 12.99 km².
