= Jänschwalde Power Station =

Lignite-fired power station in Germany

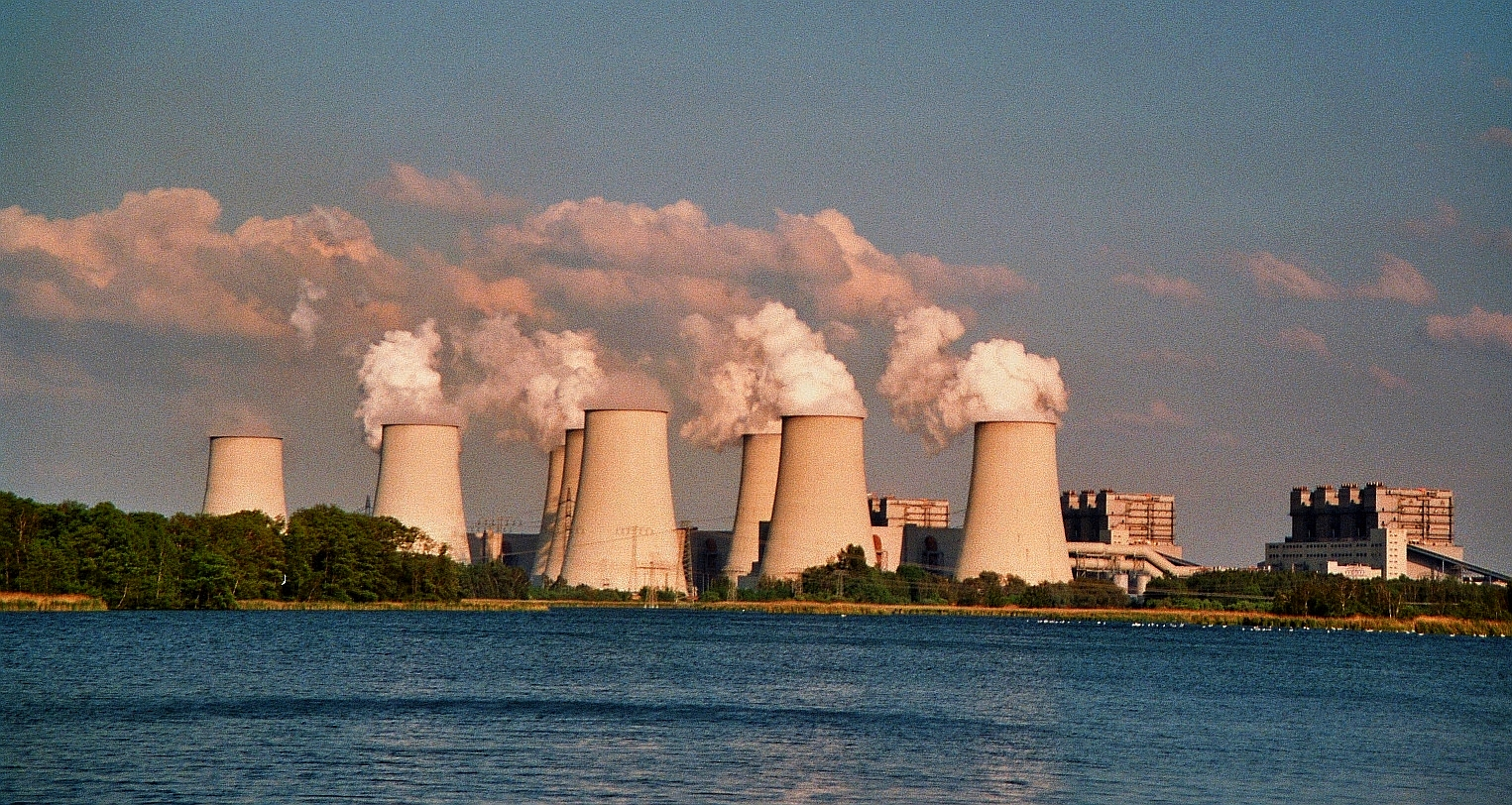
- Power Station Jänschwalde in 2010
- Country: Germany
- Location: Jänschwalde
- Coordinates: 51°50′05″N 14°27′37″E
- Status: Operational
- Construction began: 1976
- Commission date: 1981
- Owner: EPH

Thermal power station
- Primary fuel: Lignite

Power generation
- Units operational: 6
- Nameplate capacity: 3,000 MW

External links
- Commons: Related media on Commons

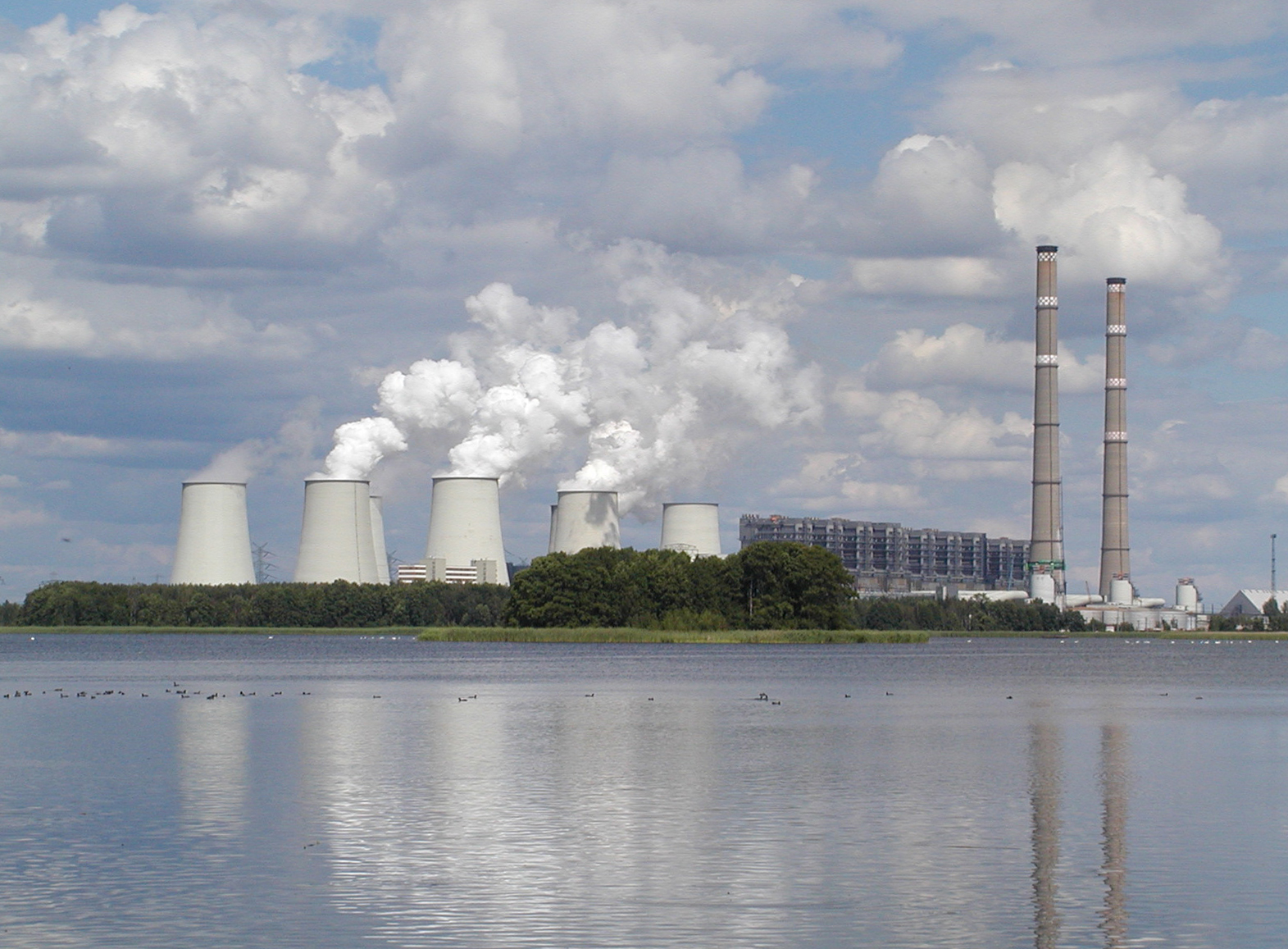
Jänschwalde Power Station in 2004. Note two 300 meter chimneys, which have since been demolished

Jänschwalde Power Station is located near the village of Jänschwalde in Brandenburg on the German-Polish border. The lignite-fired power station has an installed capacity of 3,000 megawatts and consists of six 500 MW units. It is the third-largest brown coal power plant in operation in Germany and is currently owned by LEAG/EPH, who took over its ownership from Vattenfall in 2016.

== Overview ==
The power station was built by VEB BMK Kohle und Energie (de) between 1976 and 1988. Between the German reunification and the mid-1990s, modern environmental technology was adopted, making higher energy efficiency possible. Despite this, the power station has the fifth-lowest ratio of energy efficiency to CO_{2} emission in Europe due to the low quality lignite fuel, according to a study by the WWF.

Jänschwalde power station predominantly fires raw brown coal from nearby open-pit mining in Jänschwalde and Cottbus to the north. At full load, the power station burns approximately 80,000 tons of brown coal a day. From one kilogram of brown coal about one kilowatt-hour of electrical energy is produced. The yearly power output lies around 22 billion kWh (22 TWh) when active. The waste heat is used for district heating in Cottbus.

The power station was reactivated during the 2022 energy crisis, and turned off in July 2023. In October 2023, one 500 MW unit was restarted, and another was made ready to start.

The site formerly featured three obsolete 300 meters (980 ft) chimneys. These were gradually dismantled in a complex process between 2002 and 2007, as conventional demolition was not possible on the site for space reasons. A unique procedure was introduced for this task: the chimneys were broken down from the top to a height of 50 meters (160 ft) by a special mechanism equipped with excavators which works round the edges of the chimneys, after which the remaining stacks were demolished by conventional means.

A 1 GW / 4 GWh battery energy storage system is scheduled for 2028.

On 1 September 2026 rockets were found at a substation near the plant one of which had carried a wire from the ground towards a power line.

== See also ==
- List of largest power stations in the world
