= Vattenfall =

Swedish multinational power company owned by the Government of Sweden

Vattenfall AB

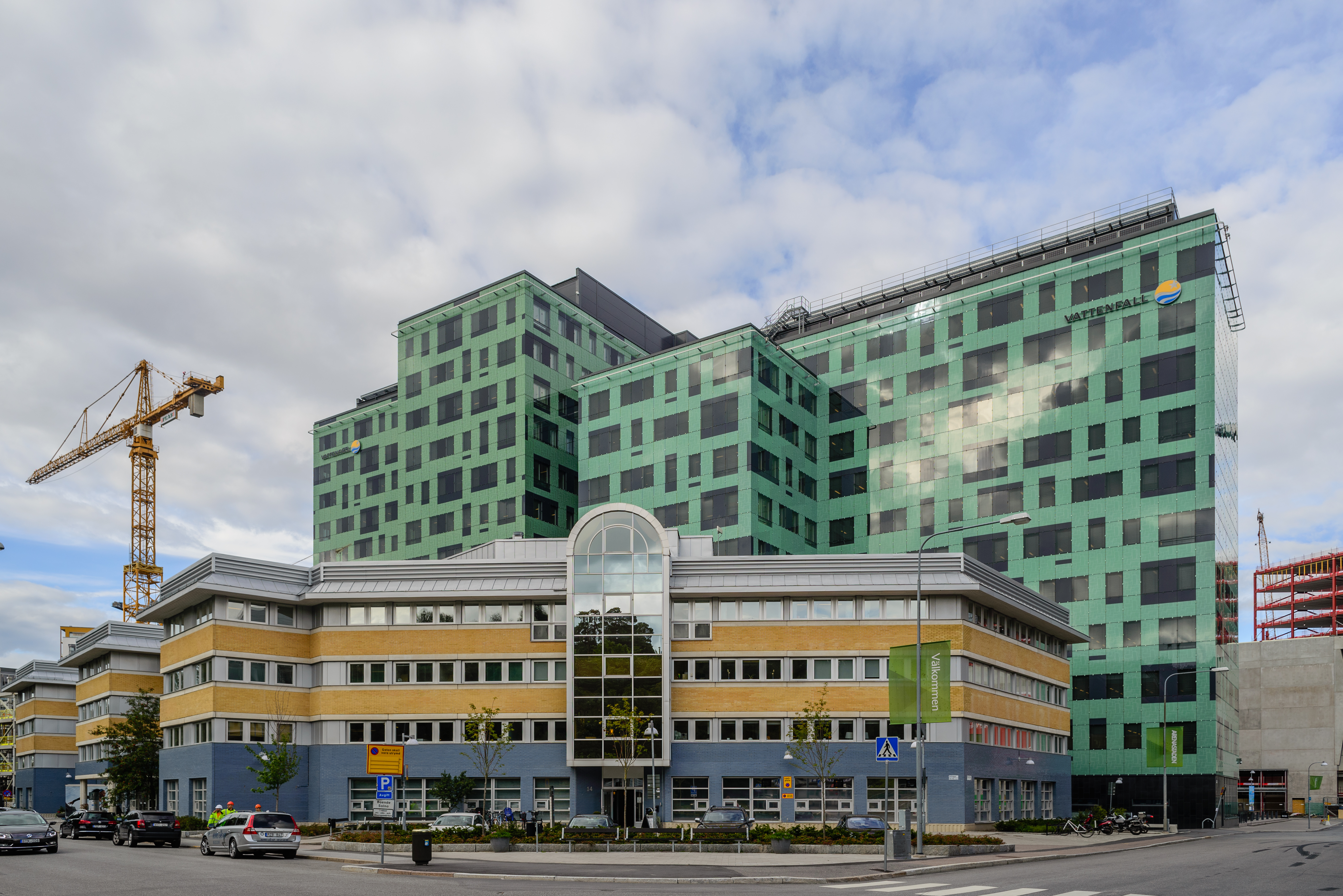
- Vattenfall's Headquarters (2014)
- Type: State-owned enterprise
- Industry: Energy production
- Founded: 1909 as Kungliga Vattenfallsstyrelsen
- Headquarters: Solna, Sweden
- Key people: Mats Granryd (Chairman of the Board); Anna Borg (President and CEO)
- Products: Electricity generation, distribution and sales, district heating, renewable energy.
- Services: Charging solutions for electric vehicles, energy efficiency
- Revenue: ▼234.915 billion kr (2025)
- Operating income: ▼27.102 billion kr (2025)
- Net income: ▼19.700 billion kr (2025)
- Total assets: ▼518.013 billion kr (2025)
- Total equity: ▼199.394 billion kr (2025)
- Owner: Swedish state – 100%
- Number of employees: 20,869 FTE (2025)
- Website: group.vattenfall.com
- Footnotes; Statistics from the 2025 financial statements

Vattenfall is a Swedish multinational power company owned by the Swedish state. Beyond Sweden, the company generates power in Denmark, Finland, Germany, the Netherlands, and the United Kingdom.

The company's name is Swedish for "waterfall", and is an abbreviation of its original name, Royal Waterfall Board (Kungliga Vattenfallsstyrelsen).

== History ==
Vattenfall (then called Kungliga Vattenfallsstyrelsen or Royal Waterfall Board) was founded in 1909 as a state-owned enterprise in Sweden. From its founding until the mid-1970s, Vattenfall's business was largely restricted to Sweden, with a focus on hydroelectric power generation. Only in 1974 did the company begin to build nuclear reactors in Sweden (the Ringhals 1 and 2 reactors), eventually owning seven of Sweden's 12 reactors. In 1992, Vattenfall was reformed as the joint-stock company Vattenfall AB. At the same time, the transmission grid (220 kV and 400 kV lines) was transferred to the newly formed state agency Svenska kraftnät, which also became responsible for the operation of the national power system.

In the years 1990 through 2009, Vattenfall expanded considerably (especially into Germany, Poland and the Netherlands), acquiring stakes in Hämeen Sähkö (1996), HEW (1999, 25.1% stake from the city of Hamburg), the Polish heat production company EW (2000, 55% stake), the Danish Elsam A/S (2005, 35.3% stake), and Nuon (2009, 49% stake, today 100%). In 2002, Vattenfall AB and its acquisitions were incorporated as Vattenfall Europe AG, making it the third-largest electricity producer in Germany.

Following the expansion period, Vattenfall started to divest parts of its business in Denmark and Poland during the years following 2009 in a strategy to focus on three core markets: Sweden, Netherlands, and Germany. Write-downs on coal-fired and nuclear power plant assets in Germany and gas power plants in the Netherlands were necessary for a difficult market environment with increasing renewable energy market share and due to the German nuclear power phase-out decision made in 2011. In summer 2013 Vattenfall announced a write-down of the value of its assets by 29.7 billion SEK (US$4.6 billion). A major part of these write-offs were attributed to Nuon Energy NV, a Netherlands-based utility that Vattenfall purchased at an 89 billion SEK (ca. US$15 billion) price in 2009, but whose values were depreciating by 15 billion SEK (ca. US$2 billion) since. The gloomy market outlook of decreasing power prices in combination with increasing risks notably on the continental market prompted the board to revise the group strategy by splitting its organizational structure into a Nordic part and a part with operations in continental Europe and the United Kingdom as of 2014. Some analysts have perceived this strategic review as a precursor to a partial retreat from continental European activities with a shift of focus towards activities in the Scandinavian market. In this context and in response to a local referendum on re-municipilization of distribution grids, Vattenfall agreed on the sale of company-owned electricity and district-heat grids in Hamburg to the City of Hamburg in early 2014. In each of the second quarters of 2015 and 2016, Vattenfall filed impairments of SEK 28 billion, mostly due to lignite power stations in Germany. Operational financials were satisfactory. In 2020, Vattenfall reported a profit of SEK 7,716 billion with an operating profit (EBIT) of SEK 15,276 billion.

Outside of Sweden, Vattenfall is known for playing the crucial role in forcing the Soviet government to publicly reveal the Chernobyl disaster. The Kremlin had tried to cover up the accident for a day, but elevated radiation levels at Vattenfall's Forsmark Nuclear Power Plant forced the Kremlin to admit the accident had occurred.

In October 2020, it was announced that Gunnar Groebler, senior vice president at Vattenfall responsible for the company's wind power operations, would leave the organisation to join Salzgitter AG.

Magnus Hall, President and CEO from October 2014, decided to leave the company in July 2020 and was succeeded by Anna Borg on 1 November 2020.

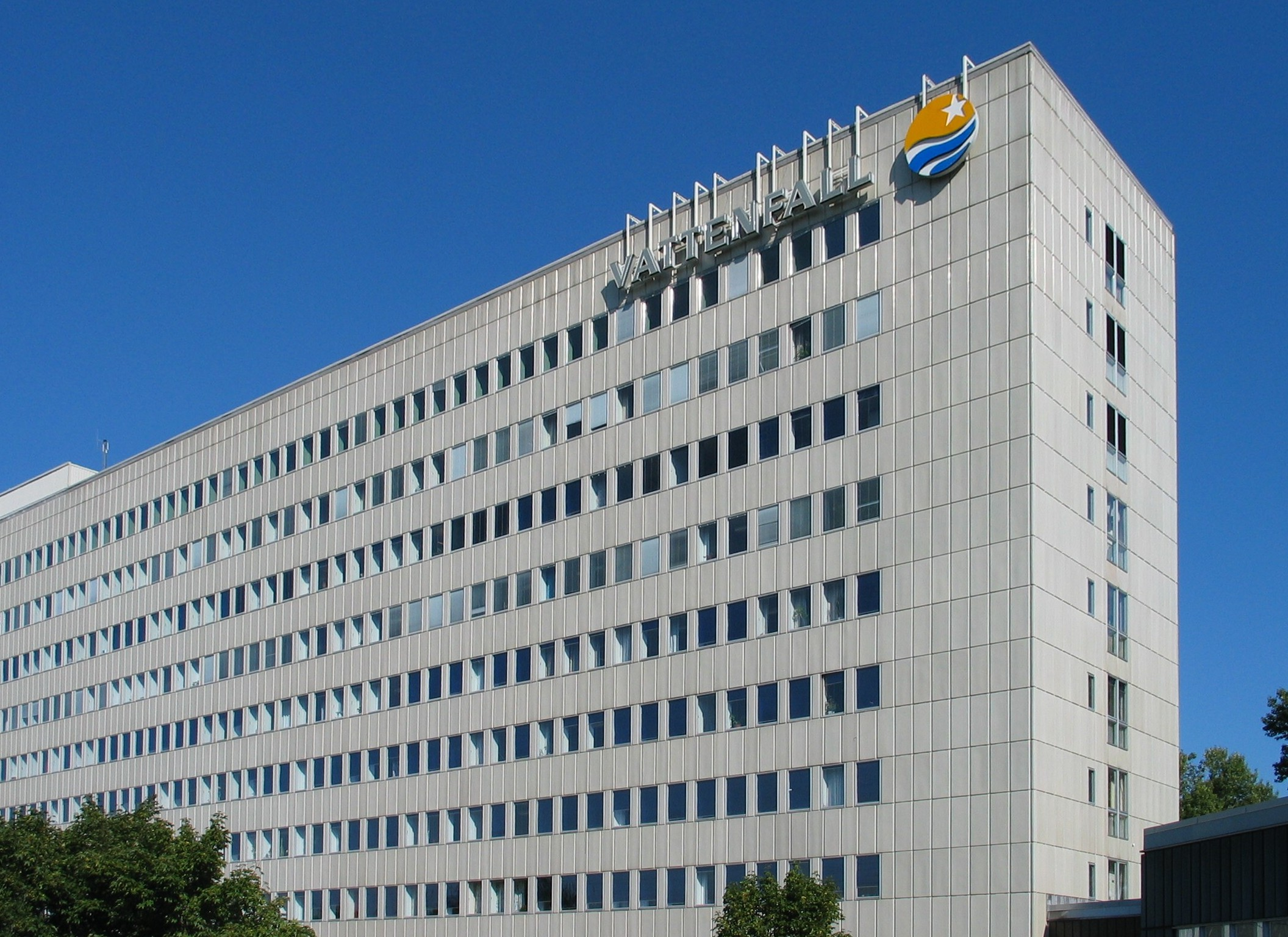
Vattenfall's old buildings in Råcksta were abandoned in autumn 2012. They are being converted into flats since.

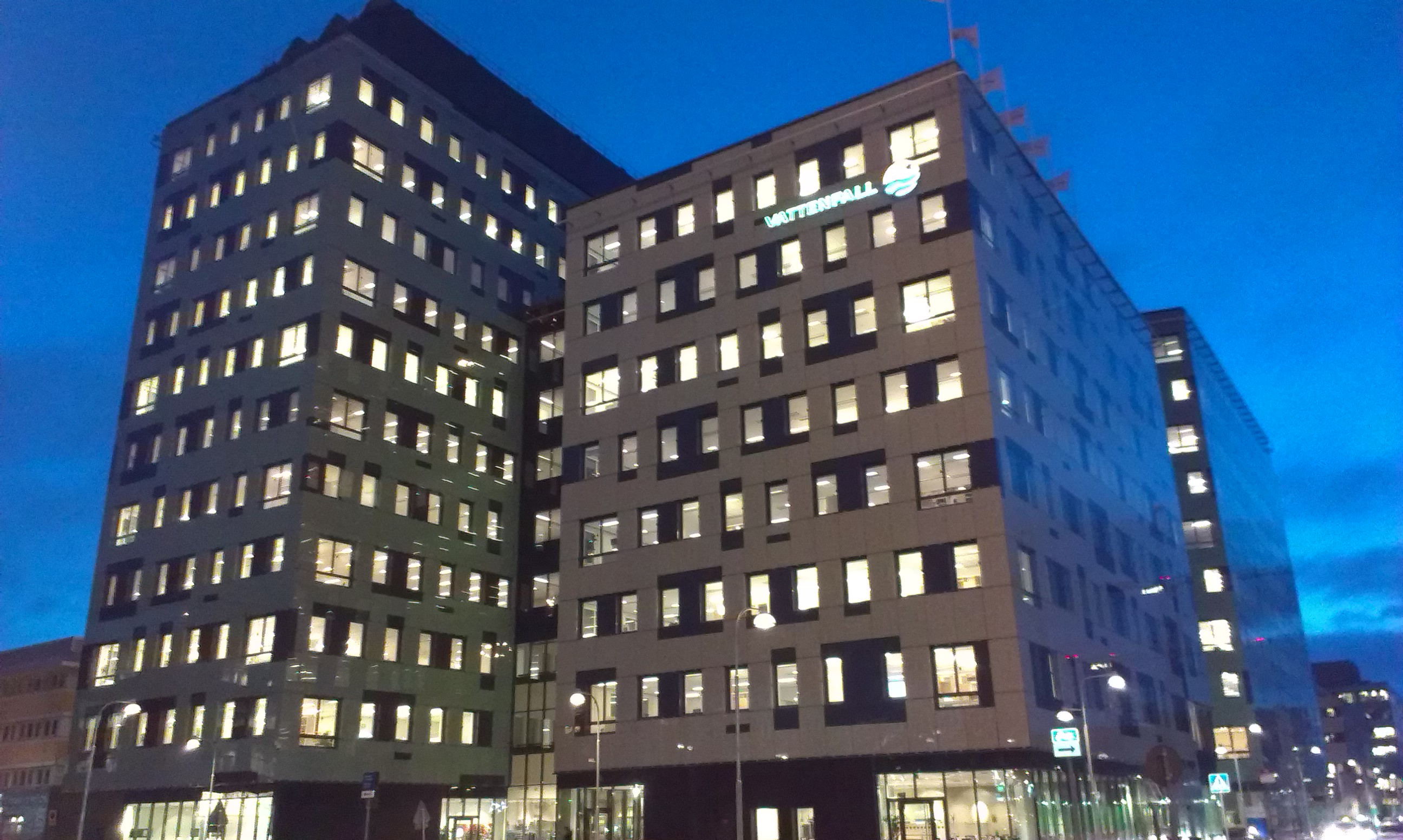
Vattenfall's headquarters were moved to a new building in Solna, north of Stockholm, in autumn 2012.

== Expansion beyond Sweden ==
In 2006, Vattenfall began production of the pilot carbon capture and storage (CCS) plant at Schwarze Pumpe, Germany. In 2007, the Lillgrund Wind Farm off the southern coast of Sweden was commissioned and began delivering electricity.

Vattenfall has power generation branches in the core markets Sweden, Germany, the Netherlands, United Kingdom, and Denmark, and also has operations in Finland. In Germany, Vattenfall is the electric utility for the states of Hamburg, Mecklenburg-Vorpommern, Brandenburg, Berlin, Saxony-Anhalt, Thuringia, and Saxony.

The company entered the British retail energy market in June 2017, but announced in November 2019 that it is considering to pull out again, citing unfavourable market conditions including strong competition and government-imposed price controls. The company remains one of the largest operators in UK offshore wind and operates the largest onshore windfarm in England and Wales.

== Generation ==
As of 2019, renewables accounted for 35% of the firm's total generation capacity, including wind, solar and hydro power.

Some of Vattenfall's most notable power generation plants include the 110 MW Lillgrund Wind Farm off the coast of Malmö, Sweden, the world's largest offshore wind farm of that time at Thanet, UK, the nuclear reactors Brunsbüttel Nuclear Power Plant (67% ownership), Krümmel Nuclear Power Plant (50% ownership), Brokdorf Nuclear Power Plant (20% ownership) in Germany, and the Forsmark Nuclear Power Plant and Ringhals Nuclear Power Plant in Sweden. The nuclear power stations of Brunsbüttel and Krümmel were shut down permanently in response to a governmental order in summer 2011 following the Fukushima Daiichi nuclear disaster.

Vattenfall also operates biomass and other power plants in Germany and the Netherlands.

=== Exit from German lignite coal ===
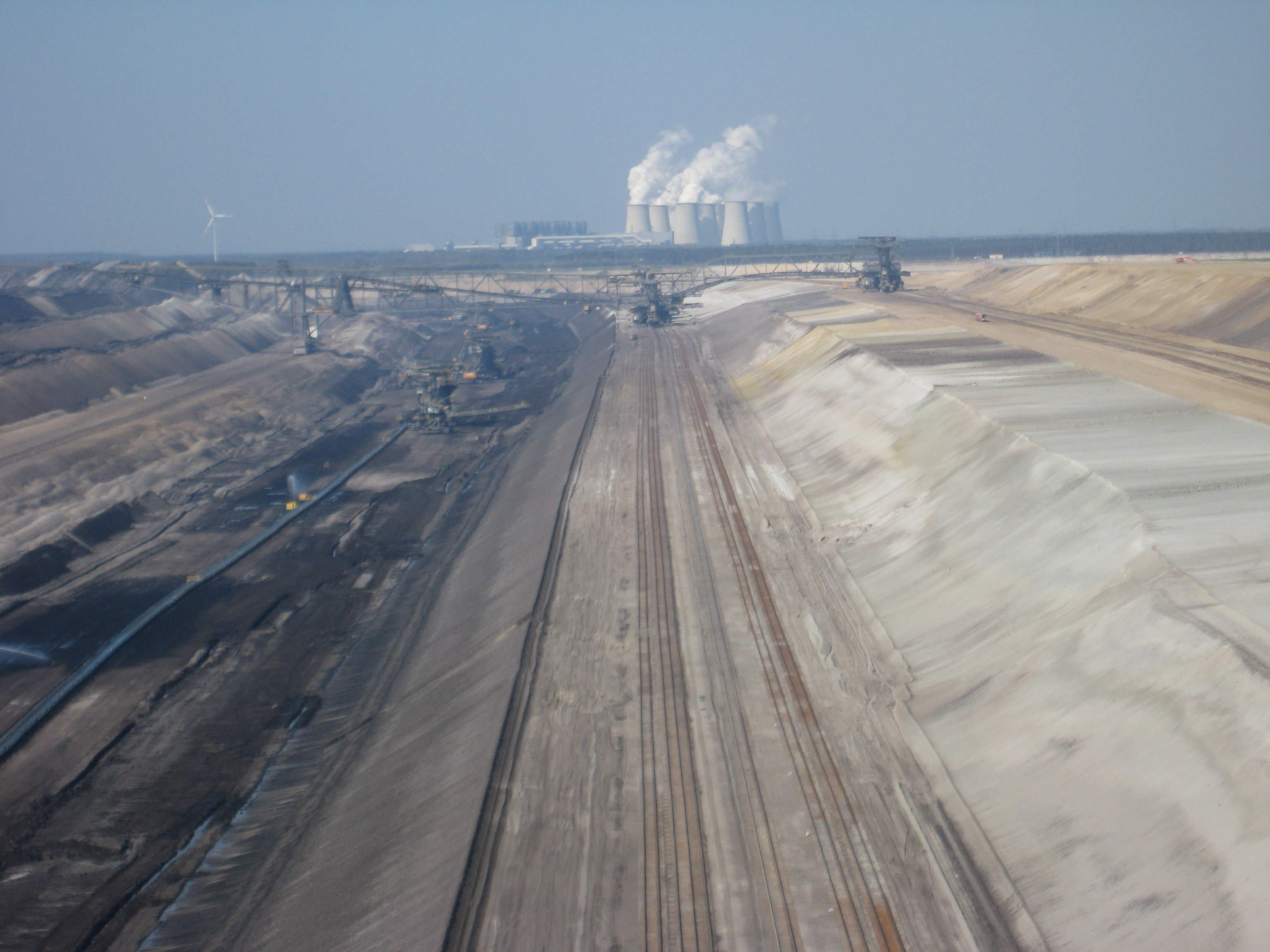
Open pit coal mine Jänschwalde and the Jänschwalde power plant, Brandenburg, Germany (April 2010)

Until 2016, Vattenfall owned several open pit coal mines digging up lignite for Vattenfall lignite power stations, including the Jänschwalde Power Station, the Boxberg Power Station, the Lippendorf Power Station (owned in part) and the Schwarze Pumpe Power Station. In 2014, Vattenfall had a lignite turnover of €2.3 billion and a profit of €647 million, but later lost money on lignite as power prices decreased from 40 to 20 €/MWh. On 30 September 2016, Vattenfall completed the sale of its German lignite facilities to the Czech energy group EPH and its financial partner PPF Investments.

=== Nuclear generation ===
In January 2016, Vattenfall announced that its Swedish nuclear power plants, including the newer reactors, were operating at a loss due to low electricity prices and Sweden's nuclear output tax. It warned that if it was forced to shut the plants down, there would be serious consequences to Sweden's electricity supply, and argued that the nuclear output tax should be scrapped.

In October 2016, Vattenfall began litigation against the German government for its 2011 decision to accelerate the phase-out of nuclear power. Vattenfall claimed almost €4.7 billion in damages at the World Bank's International Centre for Settlement of Investment Disputes (ICSID) in Washington, D.C.. The response of the German government regarding the action was that it was "inadmissible and unfounded". In March 2021, the German government agreed to a settlement which resulted in €1.425 billion being paid to Vattenfall as part of a larger compensation package for all the utility companies impacted.

Vattenfall held an 80% stake in Videberg Kraft AB, which planned to build three Rolls-Royce SMRs near Ringhals Nuclear Power Plant. In 2026, the Swedish government decided to purchase a 60% stake from Vattenfall for SEK1.8 billion (US$190 million) leaving Vattenfall with a 20% stake, with the government providing SEK34.3 billion (US$3.5 billion) of capital costs required by the 60% share.

=== Carbon intensity ===
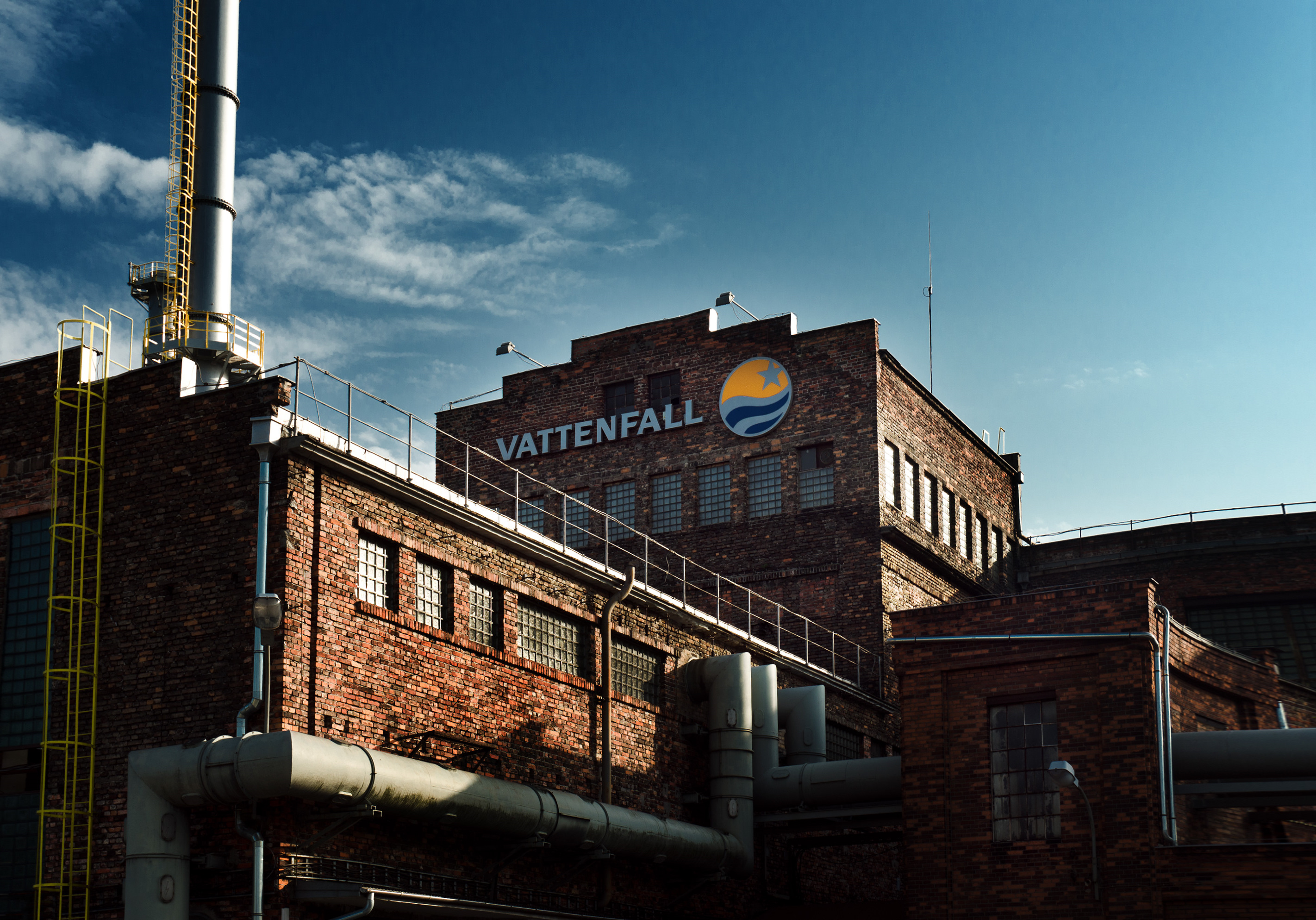
Vattenfall used to own assets in Poland until their divestment in 2011. Here exemplarily a power station in Pruszków, near Warsaw.

Year	Electricity Production (TWh)	Emission (Gt CO_{2})	kg CO_{2} /MWh	Sweden (TWh)	kg CO_{2} /MWh
2006	165	74.5	450		
2007	184	84.5	459		
2008	178	81.72	459		
2009	175	79.05	452		
2010		93.7	416		
2011	167	88.6	418		
2012	179	85.0	400		
2013	181.7	88.4	412		

== Distribution ==
Vattenfall dominates the electrical distribution in 60 municipalities in Sweden. Other major grid companies include Ellevio (formerly Fortum) and E.ON.

== Green transition initiatives ==
In May 2025, Vattenfall, in collaboration with technology company Energy Bank and German bidirectional charger manufacturer Ambibox, launched a pilot project in Sweden aimed at advancing the energy transition towards a fossil-free future. The initiative involved 200 Volkswagen electric vehicles equipped with bidirectional charging technology—also known as Vehicle to Grid (V2G) and Vehicle to Home (V2H)—which enables cars to both draw and supply electricity. Ambibox provides the chargers, while Energy Bank supplies the software to optimize energy usage and grid integration. By storing fossil-free electricity when prices are low and supplying it to households or the grid during peak times, the project explores how electric vehicles can contribute to a more efficient and sustainable energy system. The pilot, which includes private households and Volkswagen dealerships, builds on previous trials and aims to evaluate the technology’s performance and commercial viability.

== Car seatbelt ==
Vattenfall played a vital early role in the development of the seat belt, developing a two-point seatbelt which became the direct precursor to the modern three-point seatbelt.

Fatal car accidents were rapidly increasing in Sweden during the 1950s. When a study at Vattenfall of accidents among employees revealed that the majority of casualties came from car accidents. Vattenfall discussed this finding with vehicle manufacturers including Volvo and Saab. The companies provided Vattenfall with test cars, but were not enthusiastic about Vattenfall's suggestion of incorporating seat belts for better safety due to concerns that seat belts might make drivers think that driving a car was dangerous.

In light of this, two Vattenfall engineers, Bengt Odelgard and Per-Olof Weman, started to develop a safety belt. This development work let to the creation of a diagonal seat belt, known as the 'Vattenfall seat belt' to be used in their vehicles. Until the mid 1960s, this was the standard seatbelt in Sweden and various countries in Europe. Their work set the standard for safety belts in cars worldwide and was presented to Volvo in the late 1950s, who went on to develop the idea into the three-point safety belt.

== Criticism ==
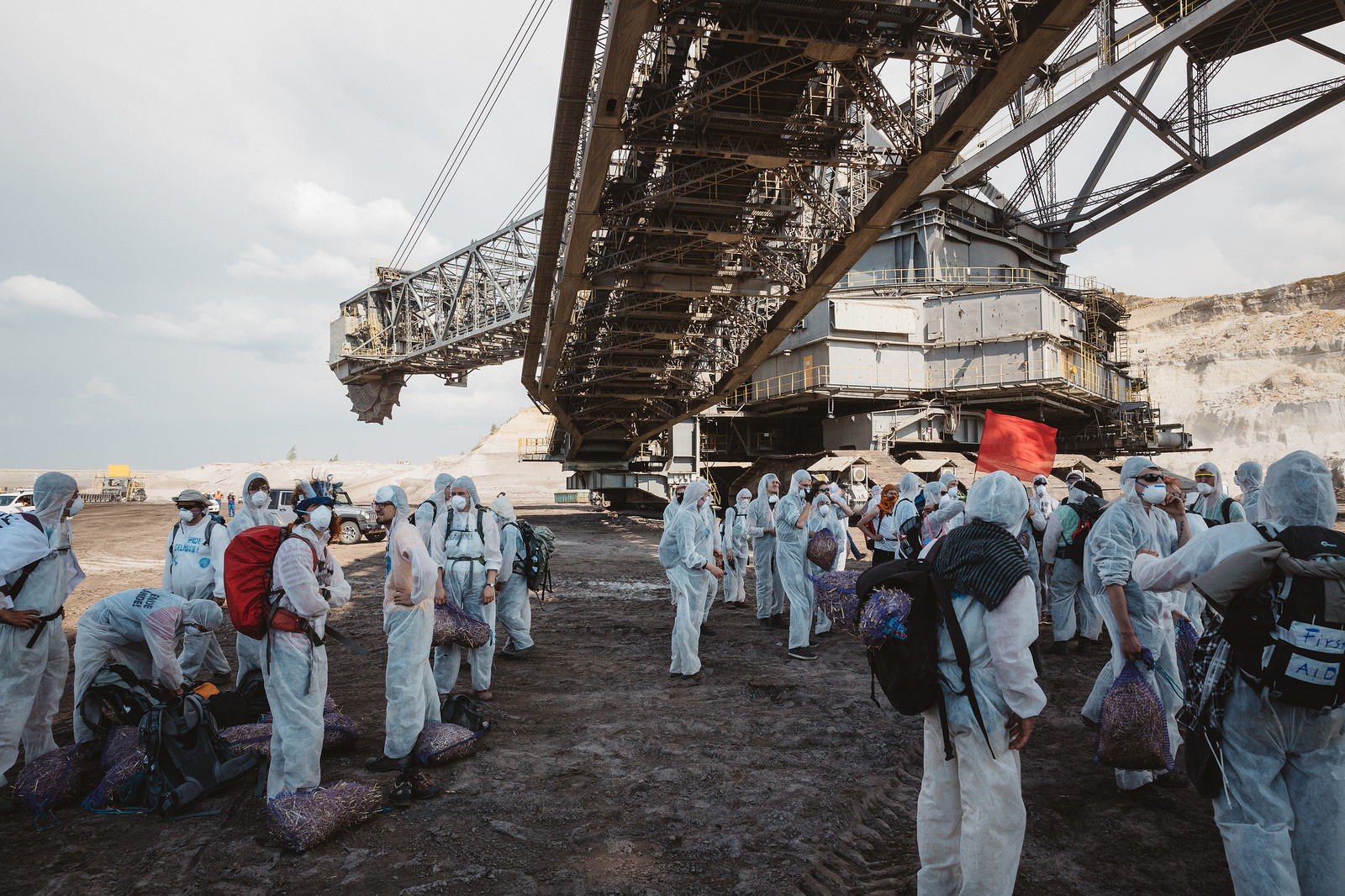
3,500–4,000 environmental activists blocking a coal mine and the Schwarze Pumpe power station to limit climate change (Ende Gelände 2016)

Vattenfall's past expansion strategy has involved the acquisition of multiple brown coal (lignite)-fired power plants, which has been highly controversial in Sweden and Germany due to the fact that brown coal is among the most carbon-intensive forms of electricity generation. In addition, brown coal is strip mined in a process that sometimes forces communities to relocate as mining fields expand. Vattenfall sold its brown coal assets in September 2016 to Czech investor EPH .

In May 2009, campaign group Corporate Europe Observatory (CEO) launched the Climate Greenwash Awards, declaring Vattenfall the inaugural winner for portraying itself as a climate champion while lobbying to continue business as usual. Vattenfall owns (or has owned) four of the "dirty thirty" most polluting power stations in Europe, a list compiled by WWF and other organizations.

A fire in the transformer of the nuclear power plant Krümmel (partly owned with E.ON) in 2007 forced a closure of the power plant for over two years, while a short circuit in July 2009 in another transformer led to another closure. Due to these incidents the Prime Minister of Schleswig-Holstein, Germany, Peter Harry Carstensen announced that this will be letzter Versuch (their last try) before complete closure of the facility.

Vattenfall has been accused of skirting the line of illegality in its effort to maintain ownership of electrical power grids. In 2013, Vattenfall's efforts to maintain ownership of Hamburg's power grid by lobbying the ruling SPD drew criticism.

In Germany, the Berlin Energy Table (Berliner Energietisch) alliance united a number of NGOs and local groups initiating a Referendum on the recommunalization of energy supply in Berlin. The referendum took place on 3 November 2013, yet slightly missed the quorum. However, the Senate of Berlin promised to match the citizens' initiative's key claim, regardless of the referendum's outcome: to transfer all end-user operations, which were owned by Vattenfall at the time, to a public utility company. The company was founded in 2014 as "Berliner Stadtwerke."

Vattenfall has also faced criticism from The Scottish Wildcat Association for looking to expand their wind farm in Clashindarroch Forest near Huntly in Scotland, which houses a large number of the critically endangered Scottish Wildcat.

== See also ==
- Svenska kraftnät
- European Transmission System Operators
- List of government enterprises of Sweden
- List of Swedish companies
- Scotland-Norway interconnector
- Vattenfall Cyclassics – a cycle race in Hamburg
