= Schwarze Pumpe power station =

Lignite-fired power plant in eastern Germany

Black Pump power station
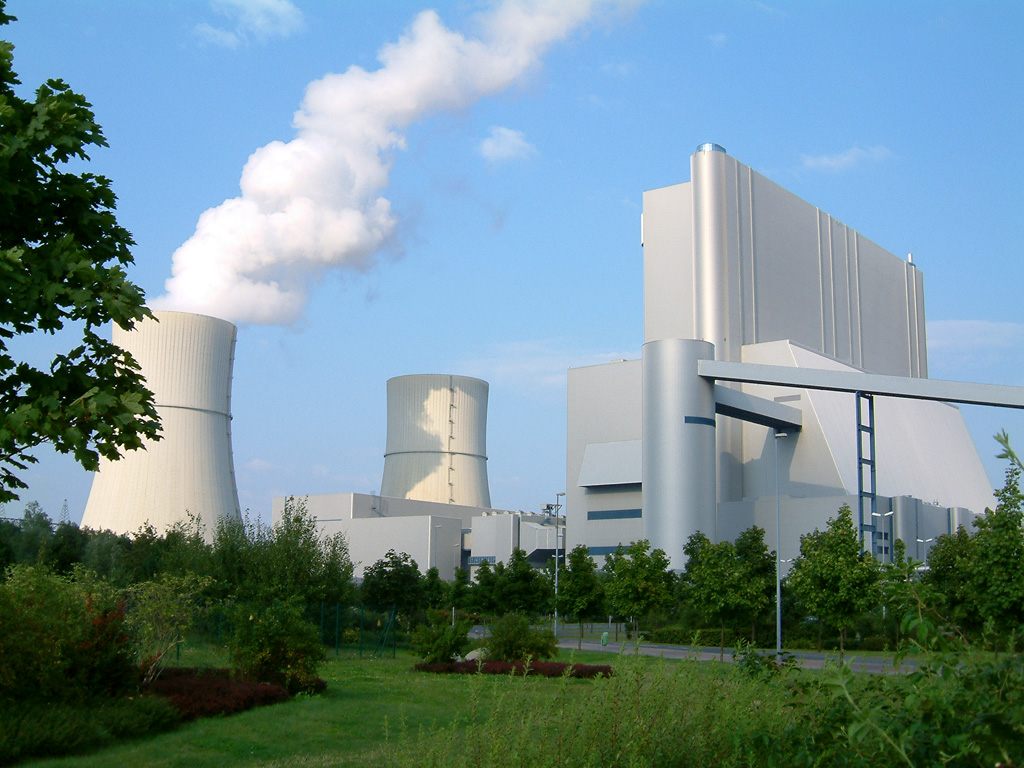
- Official name: Kraftwerk Schwarze Pumpe
- Country: Germany
- Location: Schwarze Pumpe district in Spremberg, Brandenburg
- Coordinates: 51°32′10″N 14°21′12″E
- Status: Operational
- Commission date: 1997
- Owner: LEAG
- Operators: LEAG; Vattenfall

Thermal power station
- Primary fuel: Coal

Power generation
- Units operational: 2
- Nameplate capacity: 1600 MW

External links
- Commons: Related media on Commons

Black Pump power station (German: Kraftwerk Schwarze Pumpe, literally 'power station Black Pump') is a modern lignite–fired (brown coal) power station in the Black Pump (Schwarze Pumpe) (Note: Legend has the name Black Pump dating to the end of the Thirty Years' War when the Swedes were plundering the region. To stop them, residents used a ruse: they painted the pump of the Inn of their Slav settlement black, which at the time signified the plague. The plunderers moved on, the name 'Black Pump' stayed.) district in Spremberg, Germany, consisting of 2 × 800 megawatts (MW) units. Built by Siemens, the current plant came into service in 1997–1998. On 30 September 2016, Vattenfall sold the power station to the Czech energy group EPH and its financial partner PPF Investments. The cooling towers are 161 metres (528 ft) high and have an observation deck on top.

The site has been a large-scale industrial site processing lignite since it was first developed in 1955 during the DDR era. The DDR-era plant produced high-temperature lignite coke from lignite for blast furnaces, coal gas to fire steam turbine electrical generation, motor fuels, and a variety of chemical feedstocks.

A 53 MWh / 50 MW grid battery started in 2021.

== Carbon capture and storage pilot plant ==
On 26 May 2006, construction started on an oxy-fuel combustion process carbon capture and storage pilot plant in the Black Pump industrial area. With a thermal power of 30 MW, the plant burned coal with pure oxygen (nitrogen-free) gas, replacing air in what is known as oxy-fuel combustion. The idea was that the resulting carbon dioxide would be compressed and liquefied. It would then be put into geologic formations and stored so as not to contribute to global warming. The aim of the plant wasn't to produce electricity but to produce steam, which would then be used by nearby industries.

Vattenfall stopped carbon capture research and development at the plant in 2014 because they found that "its costs and the energy it requires make the technology unviable."

The facility was meant to serve as a prototype for larger power plants. Back in 2005, environmentalists criticized the facility. In their opinion, a greater impact on the reduction of global warming could have been obtained for the same money through investments in renewable energies and efficient power production and use.

== Criticisms ==
Between 13 and 15 May 2016, 3,500–4,000 environmental activists blocked the open-pit coal mine and the Black Pump power station to limit climate change in a project known as Ende Gelände 2016. During that protest, on 14 May 2016, environmental campaigners tried to force the power plant to shut down by occupying the coal transport railway tracks in the plant. 120 people were arrested, and 2,000 climate activists occupied different areas of the nearby mine Welzow-Süd and the rails of the coal transport trains in order to stop the fuel supply to the power plant Black Pump and thereby force a stop plant operation.
