= England national football team manager =

The role of an England national football team manager was first established in 1946 with the appointment of Walter Winterbottom. Before this, the England national football team was selected by the "International Selection Committee", a process in which the Football Association (FA) would select coaches and trainers from the league to prepare the side for single games, but where all decisions ultimately remained under the control of the committee. A 1–0 defeat by Switzerland prompted FA secretary Stanley Rous to raise Winterbottom from "National Director of coaching" to "Manager".

Nineteen men have occupied the post since its inception, four of those in short-term caretaker manager roles. Winterbottom held the position for the longest to date; a tenure of 16 years, including four appearances in the World Cup and a total of 139 matches. Alf Ramsey is the only manager to have won a major tournament, winning the 1966 World Cup with his "Wingless Wonders". Besides Ramsey, only Gareth Southgate at Euro 2020 and Euro 2024 has taken the team to a major tournament final. The other managers to have progressed to the semi-finals of a major competition are Bobby Robson at the 1990 World Cup, Terry Venables at Euro 1996, and Southgate at the 2018 World Cup.

Swedish coach Sven-Göran Eriksson became the first foreign manager of the team in January 2001 amid much acrimony. He led the team to reach three successive quarter-finals in major championships. Italian manager Fabio Capello replaced Steve McClaren in December 2007, after England failed to qualify for Euro 2008. Capello's side endured a lackluster performance during the 2010 World Cup, but the FA confirmed that he would remain in the role. Capello resigned in February 2012, following a disagreement with the FA over their removal of John Terry as captain. He was replaced, on a caretaker basis, by Stuart Pearce, before Roy Hodgson was named as Capello's permanent replacement in May 2012. Hodgson's contract finished on 27 June 2016 as England were knocked out of UEFA Euro 2016 by Iceland in the round of 16. Sam Allardyce was announced as his successor a month later, but subsequently left the role after just one competitive match. He was replaced on a caretaker basis by England under-21 coach and former England international defender Gareth Southgate, whose position was made permanent after four matches.

The incumbent England manager is Thomas Tuchel, a German.

The England manager's job is subject to intense press scrutiny, often including revelations about the incumbent's private life. Due to the high level of expectation of both the public and media, the role has been described as "the impossible job" or compared in importance in national culture to that of the British Prime Minister.

== Position ==
=== Role ===
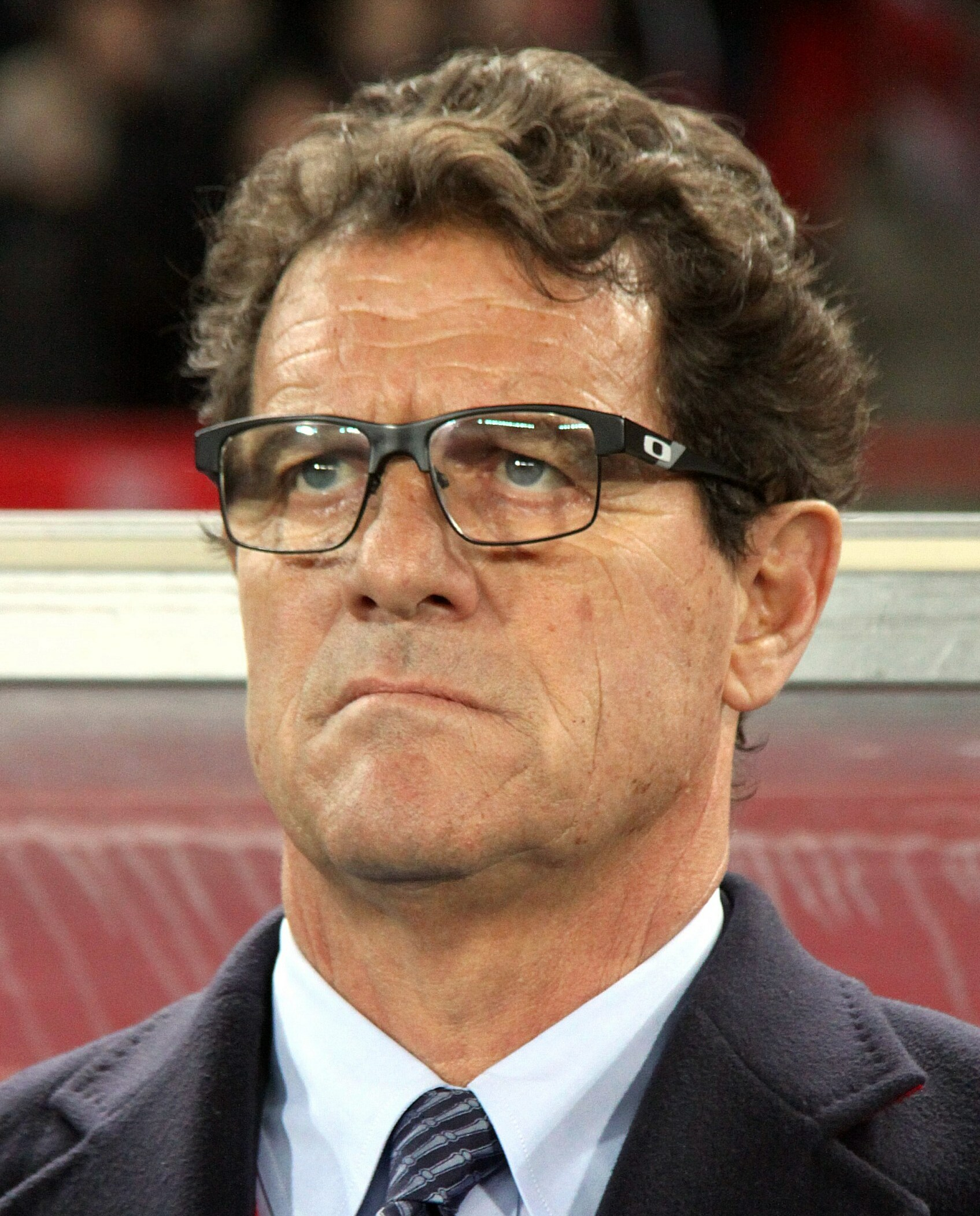
Former England manager Fabio Capello appointed only one Englishman on his coaching staff.

The England manager's role means he has sole responsibility for all on-the-field elements of the England team. Among other activities, this includes selecting the national team squad, the starting team, captain, tactics, substitutes and penalty-takers. Before 1946, the "Select Committee" (as appointed by the FA) would manage all issues barring the actual match day team selection, formation and tactics which was left to the head coach for the event. However interference was common, and not only from the FA. After the Second World War, with the relaunch of competitive international calendar, the manager's role expanded to take in all elements: from the selection of hotel and training camp venues, through to food and travel arrangements.

The manager is given a free hand in selecting his coaching ("back room") staff. For example, in 2008 Fabio Capello appointed four Italians (Franco Baldini as general manager, Italo Galbiati as assistant coach, Franco Tancredi as goalkeeping coach and Massimo Neri as fitness coach); he then appointed Englishman Stuart Pearce, the England under-21s coach, as an England coach, with Capello stating: "From the start I made it clear that I wanted an English coach as part of my coaching team."

The England manager may also involve himself in wider issues beyond the on-the-field team issues. On a more tactical level, a host of other details can be influenced; Capello is even believed to have instructed the Wembley Stadium ball boys to return balls at speed when they go out of play.

=== Appointment ===
The process of appointing a new England manager is undertaken by an FA committee, comprising board members and other high-ranking FA officials. For example, the members of the selection panel which appointed Sven-Göran Eriksson in 2001 were: chief executive Adam Crozier, chairman Geoff Thompson, vice-chairman Dave Richards, club chairmen and FA board members David Dein and Peter Ridsdale, and technical director Howard Wilkinson.

=== National significance ===
The England manager's job has been compared in importance to that of the Prime Minister. Passion for football as England's national sport is coupled with patriotism and Wembley Stadium as the "home" of football. The dismissal or appointment of an England manager is front-page news and the subject of intense interest. Large sums are wagered on England winning, and during tournaments the country is festooned in Saint George's flags; during the 2006 World Cup, 27% of English adults bought a flag in one month alone. Shops and offices will be deserted as vast numbers of people watch the game.

The England manager's job is made more complex by his dependence on the co-operation of clubs and their managers in releasing players for friendlies, and "club versus country" conflict is said to have happened when permission is refused, given reluctantly, or negotiated. There are also repeated comments that the length of the English season (the top flight plays 38 league matches) is unhelpful for preparing tired players for major tournaments, but the self-interest of the Premier League makes a reduction in the number of games unlikely, particularly in light of the 2008 proposal for Game 39, a match played between Premier League clubs outside the country. This combination of factors, coupled with England's underwhelming record in major championships has led to the England manager's job being described as the "impossible job".

== History ==
=== Full-time era begins (1946–1962) ===
Before 1946, the England national football team had been under the leadership of a Football Association (FA) official and a trainer, usually from a London club. Appointed in 1946, initially as chief coach, Walter Winterbottom had been a member of the FA "International Selection Committee". The England squad was selected by an FA committee during his tenure, with Winterbottom's role restricted to selecting the starting team together with the coaching and tactics. In his first game as manager, he led England to a 7–2 victory over Ireland at Windsor Park, Belfast in the 1946–47 British Home Championship. Success in the Home Championship in 1950 resulted in England's qualification to the 1950 World Cup in Brazil. During the tournament, England suffered a shock defeat against the United States, and went out of the tournament with another 1–0 defeat, this time to Spain.

England experienced another surprise upset under Winterbottom's guidance in 1953 when Hungary defeated England 6–3 at Wembley Stadium. Winterbottom said afterwards, "... The press tended to think we would win easily, but I tried to point out that the Hungarians were actually a great side." He guided England to first place in the 1953–54 British Home Championship, which qualified the team for the 1954 World Cup in Switzerland, but saw his side knocked out in the quarter-finals, going down 4–2 against Uruguay. Three wins and a draw from four matches enabled England's qualification for the 1958 World Cup, only for Winterbottom's side to fail in the group play-off stage, losing 1–0 to the Soviet Union. England lost to Brazil in the quarter-final of the 1962 World Cup in Chile and, under attack from the British press, Winterbottom resigned five months later. He remains the longest serving manager of England.

=== World Cup success (1962–1974) ===
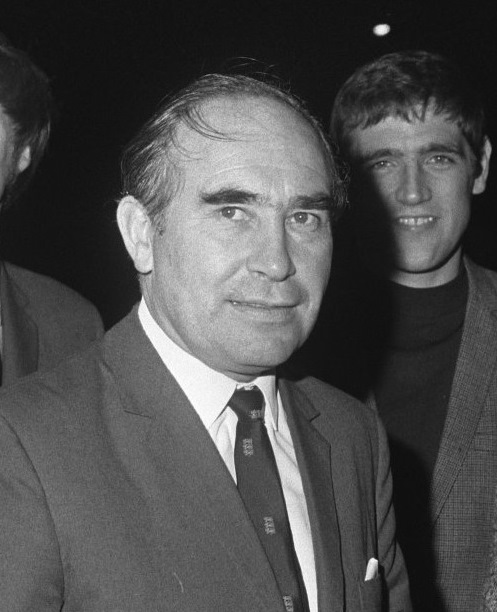
Alf Ramsey managed the England team that won the 1966 World Cup.

Alf Ramsey took control of the team in 1962, but unlike Winterbottom, Ramsey had been a club manager, winning the League championship with Ipswich Town. Upon his appointment, he declared England would win the 1966 World Cup. His first match in charge resulted in a 5–2 loss at Parc des Princes against France. England automatically qualified for the 1966 World Cup as hosts and, after a goalless draw in the first match against Uruguay, four consecutive victories saw England through to the final against West Germany. A 4–2 victory, after extra time, won England the World Cup for the only time. As a result of his and England's achievements, Ramsey was awarded a knighthood in 1967. The following year England finished third at Euro 1968 in Rome, but Ramsey reflected "We are world champions. Third place is not our real position."

Automatic qualification for the 1970 World Cup was secured as world champions so Ramsey led England on a pre-tournament tour of South America. The effects of altitude on the team led Ramsey to appoint the first full-time team doctor, Neil Phillips, who helped prepare the squad for the forthcoming tournament in Mexico. England were defeated in the quarter-final by West Germany; with a 2–0 lead with 25 minutes of the match remaining, Ramsey substituted Bobby Charlton and goalscorer Martin Peters, but West Germany went on to win 3–2 after extra time. Ramsey was heavily criticised in the British press for the substitutions. Losing out to West Germany again, this time in a two-legged quarter-final for Euro 1972, Ramsey prepared England for qualification for the 1974 World Cup. Needing a win against Poland, Ramsey's tactical use of substitutions was again called into question as the match ended in a 1–1 draw. England had failed to qualify for the World Cup, and Ramsey was dismissed the following May.

=== Turbulent times (1974–1982) ===
Joe Mercer took control of the team on a caretaker basis for seven matches, before the FA appointed Don Revie on a five-year contract. It was a year before Revie's England suffered a defeat but despite this, he changed his starting line-up for every game. His relationship with the FA had broken down and his team-building exercises, including carpet bowls and indoor golf, led to disconsolation in the squad. A 2–0 defeat to the Netherlands at Wembley Stadium turned the press against him; some commentators compared the loss to the 6–3 defeat by Hungary in 1953. Convinced he was to be replaced by Bobby Robson, he announced he was to become manager of the United Arab Emirates team. Selling his story to the Daily Mail, he subsequently resigned on 11 July 1977. Revie was charged with bringing the game into disrepute and was banned by the FA in a "kangaroo court" for ten years. On appeal to the High Court, the ban was overturned but the judge ordered Revie to pay two-thirds of the costs. Brian Clough applied for the position in 1977, but the FA rejected him and Ron Greenwood was appointed, initially as a temporary replacement for Revie, but later in 1977 on a permanent basis. Bobby Moore described him as "the encyclopaedia of football", and he guided England to Euro 1980 without a defeat during qualification.

The team exited the tournament at the group stage and Greenwood turned his attention to qualification for the 1982 World Cup in Spain. Defeats in Switzerland and Romania led Greenwood to consider resignation, but a victory over Hungary convinced him to stay. A 2–1 defeat in Oslo, which led to commentator Bjørge Lillelien's outburst concluding with "Your boys took a hell of a beating!", meant England required at least a point in their final qualifying game against Hungary. A Paul Mariner goal secured victory and qualification for the team. Wins over France, Czechoslovakia and Kuwait allowed England into the second round group but two 0–0 draws ended in England going out of the tournament, without having lost a game. Greenwood retired immediately after the World Cup and on 7 July 1982, two days after England were knocked out of the 1982 World Cup, Bobby Robson was appointed England manager, selecting former West Bromwich Albion teammate Don Howe as his chief coach.

=== Robson and "The Hand of God" (1982–1990) ===
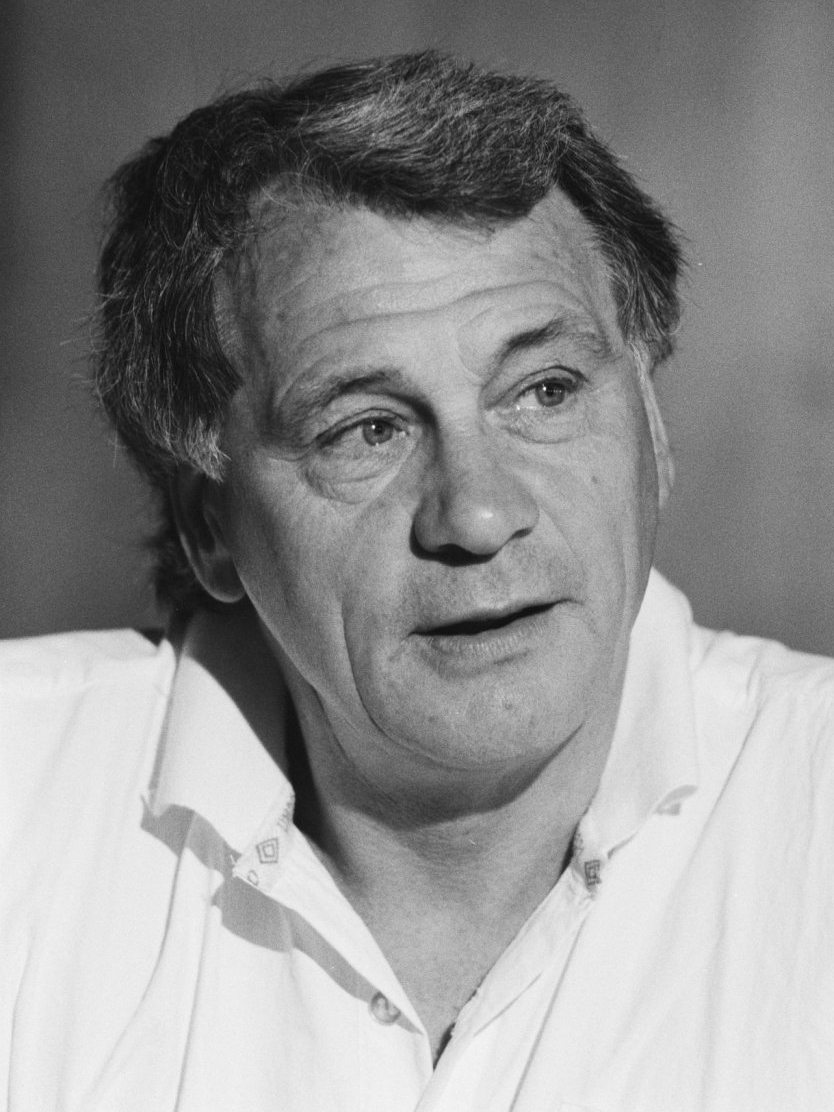
Bobby Robson managed England from 1982 to 1990.

Robson's tenure included 28 qualifying matches, of which only one, against Denmark in 1983, resulted in a defeat. This contributed to England's failure to qualify for Euro 1984, and Robson offered his resignation. It was rejected by the FA chairman, Bert Millichip, and Robson went on to lead the England team to qualify for the 1986 World Cup in Mexico. England were defeated in the quarter-final by Argentina with a brace of goals from Diego Maradona; the "Hand of God" goal, and the "Goal of the Century" he scored five minutes later.

Robson's England dropped only one point in qualifying for Euro 1988, which included an 8–0 win over Turkey. However, this was followed by failure at the tournament itself, held in West Germany, where England were knocked out in the group stage. They finished bottom of their group, succumbing to defeats against the Republic of Ireland, the Netherlands and the Soviet Union. Robson was vilified by the British press, and after a draw in a friendly with Saudi Arabia, one newspaper demanded: "In the name of Allah, go". Robson led England without conceding a goal through qualification for the 1990 World Cup.

As in the 1986 World Cup, Robson was denied the service of his captain, Bryan Robson, who suffered an achilles tendon injury which prevented him playing in the latter stages of the tournament. England topped their group in 1990, accumulating four points from their three games. However their progress was not without controversy. England changed formation from their traditional 4–4–2 to incorporate a sweeper, with some sources suggesting this was due to player revolt after the 1–1 draw in the first match with the Republic of Ireland. Robson denies this claim in his autobiography. This was followed by victories over Belgium and Cameroon in the knock-out stages, to set up a semi-final with West Germany.

England lost the match on a penalty shoot-out, after the score had been level at 1–1 following extra time. Robson's last public appearance before his death from cancer was at the Sir Bobby Robson Trophy match in July 2009, played between veterans from that 1990 semi-final as a tribute to his life and in aid of his cancer charity.

=== Controversial times (1990–2001) ===
Robson had announced before the tournament that he would step down from the post after the finals and Graham Taylor was appointed, having been approached in April 1990 by the FA. Failure to proceed past the group stage of Euro 1992 with a 2–1 defeat against Sweden led to newspaper headlines such as "Swedes 2 Turnips 1" and Taylor's nickname of "Turnip Head". Following defeat to the Netherlands in the penultimate qualifying match for the 1994 World Cup, for only the third time in its history, England had failed to qualify for the World Cup. The qualifying campaign was recorded in a television documentary, and Taylor's remark "Do I not like that" soon entered popular culture.

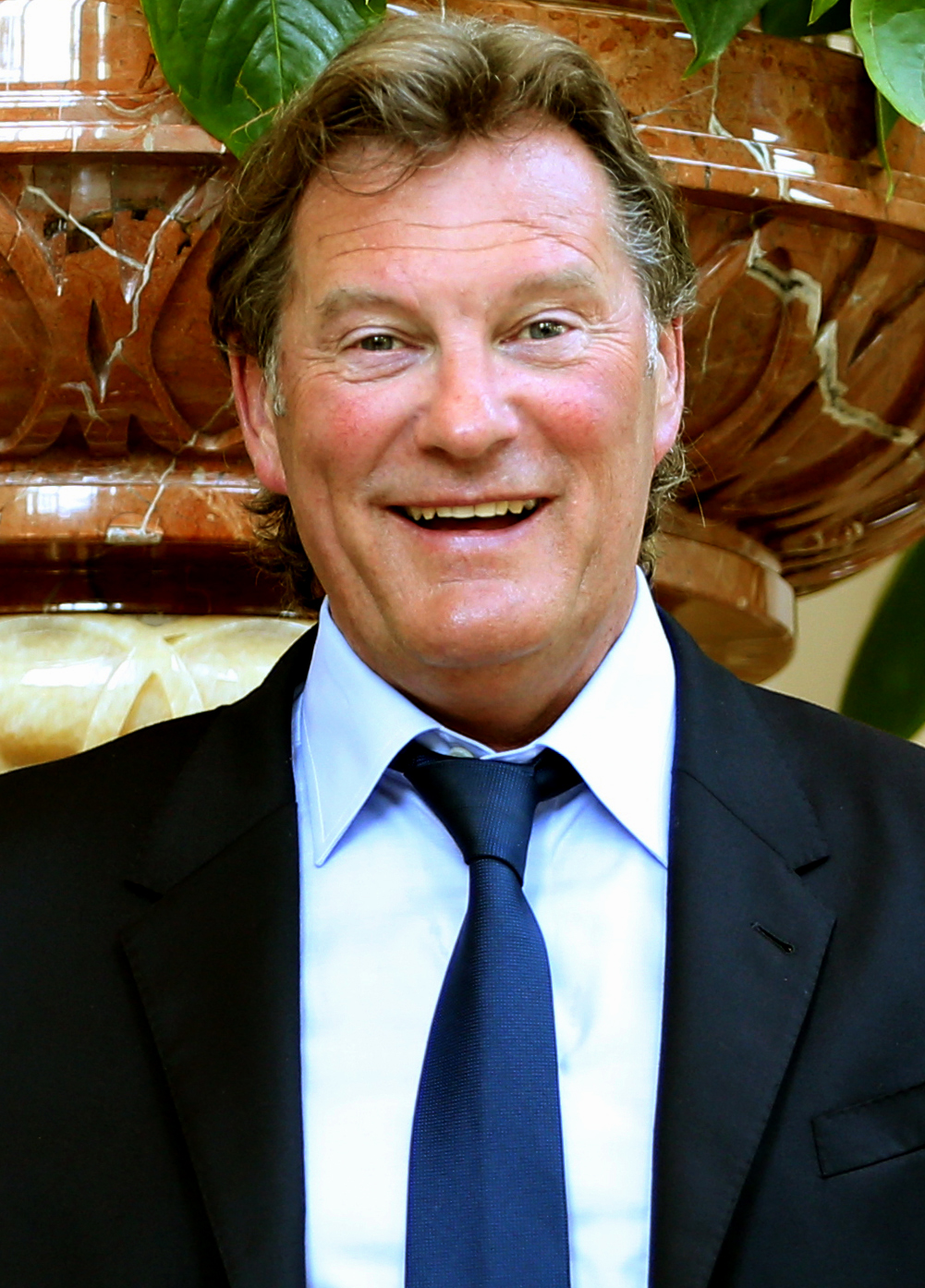
Glenn Hoddle managed England from 1996 to 1999.

Failure in the qualification resulted in Taylor resigning, and Terry Venables took over the helm in 1994. As England were hosts for Euro 1996, he did not manage the team in a competitive match for over two years. In January 1996, he announced that he would resign after the tournament as a result of several court cases, but led England to the semi-finals, where they were defeated by Germany on penalties. He was replaced by Glenn Hoddle, whose unorthodox off-the-field approach in bringing in faith healer Eileen Drewery to help the team drew significant criticism. Hoddle suggested she was "more of an agony aunt" but during the 1998 World Cup, the press suggested Drewery had influenced Hoddle in squad selection. England were knocked out of the tournament in the second round, once again on penalties, this time against Argentina. Hoddle's diary portraying his version of events at the World Cup was subsequently published, drawing further criticism.

An interview with Matt Dickinson, a reporter from The Times, suggested that Hoddle had a "controversial belief that the disabled, and others, are being punished for sins in a former life." Hoddle's comments were criticised by several notable politicians, including Sports Minister Tony Banks and Prime Minister Tony Blair. Hoddle stated that he was not prepared to resign and claimed his words were misinterpreted and pointed out his contributions and commitment to organisations helping the disabled. The FA terminated Hoddle's contract soon afterwards, which was welcomed by representatives of disabled groups.

Howard Wilkinson was caretaker manager for one game, before the appointment of Kevin Keegan in February 1999. Initially combining the job with a role at Fulham, Keegan was made full-time coach in May. He led England to qualification for Euro 2000 following success in a two-legged play-off against Scotland. Two 3–2 losses resulted in England leaving the tournament at the group stage. A loss to Germany in the last international match at the old Wembley Stadium in the first 2002 World Cup qualifying match led to Keegan's resignation. Keegan resigned an hour after the team was booed off by England fans; he told the FA officials that he felt "a little short at this level". Wilkinson again returned as caretaker for one more match, followed by Peter Taylor who presided over a friendly loss to Italy.

=== Foreign management (2001–2012) ===
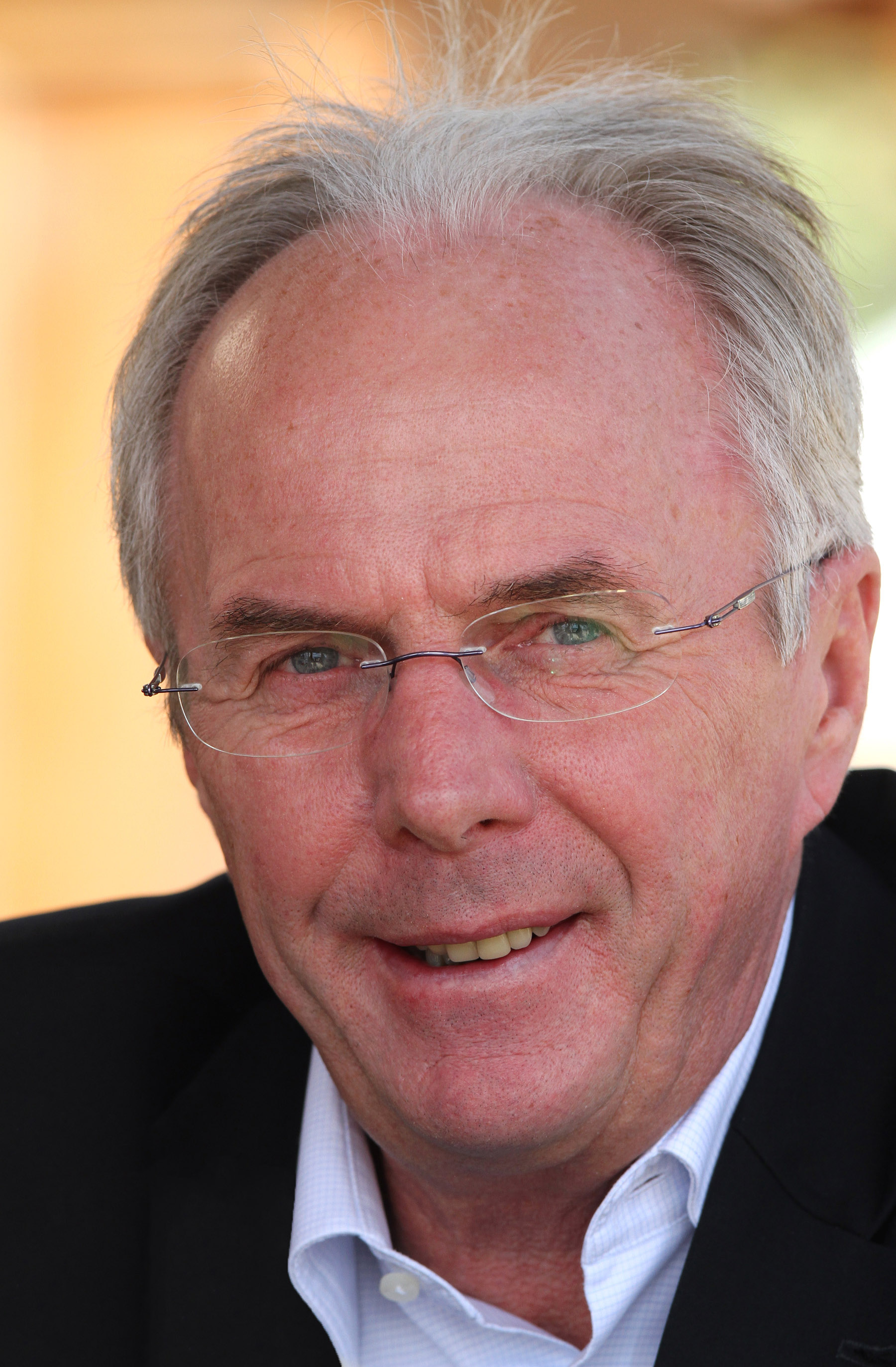
Sven-Göran Eriksson, from Sweden, became England's first foreign manager. Eriksson led England to the quarter-finals of the 2002 World Cup.

The FA then took the unprecedented, and widely criticised step of appointing the first non-Englishman as coach, Swede Sven-Göran Eriksson. Eriksson had a good record in European domestic football, with success in Portugal and Italy, and had led clubs to win UEFA competitions twice. He led England to qualify for the 2002 World Cup with David Beckham scoring the vital equaliser against Greece, deep into injury time. England were knocked out by Brazil in the quarter-finals and Eriksson came under fire for his "ice-cool" appearance on the touchline failing to inspire his team, senior player Gareth Southgate remarking after the tournament that "we needed Winston Churchill but we got Iain Duncan Smith".

Eriksson led England to qualification for Euro 2004 but once more the team fell at the quarter-final stage, again losing on penalties, this time to Portugal. Losing 1–0 to Northern Ireland in Belfast during the qualification for the 2006 World Cup led to fans chanting "Sack the Swede", frustrated again at the lack of obvious emotion in Eriksson while his coach, Steve McClaren, was much more animated.

In January 2006, the FA announced that Eriksson would stand down after the World Cup. With the team losing in the quarter-final again to Portugal and again on penalties, Eriksson duly left the post in July. The search for Eriksson's replacement was controversial. It became clear that the FA wanted to appoint Luiz Felipe Scolari, but the approach was botched, and Scolari turned down the offer. Ultimately, Eriksson was replaced by the man who had coached the side under him, Steve McClaren.

Qualification for Euro 2008 proved too much, England losing the final qualifier against Croatia 3–2 in November 2007, when a draw would have been enough to take England to the finals. The British press turned on McClaren, former Scottish international Alan Hansen stating that "... what McClaren should be held accountable for is that with a squad of this quality he failed to qualify from what seemed a reasonably straightforward group ...". McClaren was dismissed the day after the defeat by Croatia, and was replaced in December 2007 by Italian Fabio Capello. The defeat by Croatia is remembered in the sports press for the moniker "Wally with the Brolly", a reference to McClaren's pitchside presence under an umbrella in a match played in heavy rain.

Capello led England to qualification for the 2010 World Cup, winning nine of the team's ten qualifying matches, but the team's performance in the tournament was less impressive. Two lacklustre draws in the group stage against the United States and Algeria were followed by an ignominious 4–1 defeat by traditional rivals Germany in the Round of 16. The team's performance was at least partly attributed to selection and tactical errors by Capello and led to calls for his dismissal. On 2 July, the FA confirmed that he would remain in the role until 2012, with Capello himself confirming his intention to step down and retire after Euro 2012.

Conflicting reports came out of the FA as to whether the next manager would be English. On 15 August 2010, the FA's Adrian Bevington stated to the BBC that "we should have an English manager after (Euro 2012)", but on 22 September, the FA's Director of Football Development, Trevor Brooking, stated that "We would like to go English (but) we've got to see what English people are available". Two weeks later, Capello's England qualified for Euro 2012 with a 2–2 draw away against Montenegro. In February 2012, Capello resigned following the FA's decision to remove the captaincy of the national side from John Terry, with Englishman Stuart Pearce taking over the role on a caretaker basis.

=== Return to English managers (2012–2016) ===
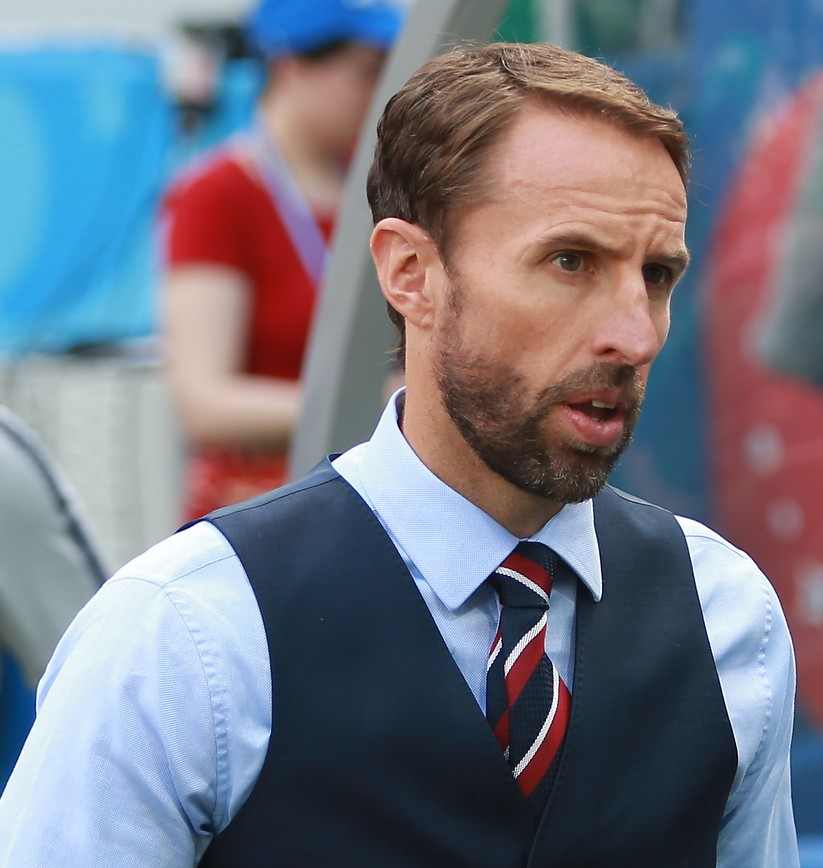
Gareth Southgate, England manager from 2016 to 2024

Following a 3–2 defeat at Wembley Stadium by the Netherlands in February, Pearce was replaced on 1 May 2012 by West Bromwich Albion manager Roy Hodgson on a four-year contract. Despite the team being based in Kraków in Poland for the tournament, England's first fixture in Euro 2012 was in Donetsk in Ukraine against France, which ended in a 1–1 draw. Subsequent victories over Sweden and tournament co-hosts Ukraine resulted in a quarter-final match against Italy. The game ended goalless after extra time, sending the game to a penalty shoot-out which Italy won 4–2. Hodgson claimed that England's exit from major tournaments had become a "national obsession". With a 2–0 victory over Poland in October 2013, Hodgson led England to qualification for the 2014 World Cup.

However, in the 2014 World Cup, England lost two consecutive group matches, against Italy and Uruguay, by 2–1 on each occasion. This was the first time England had lost two group matches since the 1950 World Cup (when they lost against the United States and Spain) and the first time England had been eliminated at the group stage since the 1958 World Cup. This was also the first time that England had not won a match at the tournament since 1958, and England's points total of one from three matches was its worst ever in the World Cup.

England qualified for UEFA Euro 2016 in September 2015, following a 6–0 win over San Marino. On 27 June 2016, Hodgson resigned as manager almost immediately after England were knocked out 2–1 by Iceland in the round of 16, a result described as the team's "worst humiliation since they were knocked out of the 1950 World Cup by USA."

=== Southgate and semi-final success (2016–2024) ===
On 22 July, Sam Allardyce was appointed England manager on a two-year contract. After only 67 days in the job, a video published by The Daily Telegraph showed Allardyce making insulting statements against former manager Roy Hodgson, and explaining how to circumvent regulations of The FA on third party ownership of players. He subsequently left the role as manager of England later that day.

Former England international defender and England under-21 coach Gareth Southgate was given the senior role on a caretaker basis for four matches while the FA considered their options. Two wins, including a 3–0 victory over Scotland, and a draw in qualifying matches for the 2018 World Cup and a 2–2 draw with Spain in a friendly followed under Southgate's temporary management, before he was formally appointed to the position full-time on 30 November 2016 on a four-year deal.

At the 2018 FIFA World Cup, England reached the semi-finals before losing to Croatia. He then took England to the final of UEFA Euro 2020, where England lost on penalties against Italy. At the 2022 FIFA World Cup, England reached the quarter-finals before losing to France. His final tournament in charge of England was UEFA Euro 2024, where he took England to their second successive European Championship final, only to lose 2–1 to Spain. Shortly after the Euro final defeat, Southgate resigned as England manager.

=== Tuchel era (2024–present) ===
On 16 October 2024, the German Thomas Tuchel was announced as the next permanent England manager, replacing Gareth Southgate and interim manager Lee Carsley. Tuchel officially started in the post on 1 January 2025, marking the end of Carsley's six-game spell in which the former Ireland international took England to the top of their Nations League group and promotion into League A for 2026–27.

Tuchel's England qualified for the 2026 FIFA World Cup on 14 October 2025, becoming the first European nation to do so.

England subsequently reached the semi final stage of the 2026 World Cup where they were defeated by Argentina. Tuchel received some criticism for his tactical changes in the match and for his initial tournament squad selection. They won the resulting bronze medal match against France, thus finishing third at the tournament, securing their highest finish since 1966.

== Media reaction ==
=== Personal attacks ===
The Sun front page, reporting Graham Taylor's resignation after England failed to qualify for the 1994 World Cup

Graham Taylor's unsuccessful reign led to the manager being pilloried in the tabloids. Most notably, The Sun newspaper reacted to a damaging defeat by Sweden at Euro 1992, by the accompaniment of the headline "Swedes 2 Turnips 1" with a photographic montage of a turnip superimposed on Taylor's head. Taylor was thereafter often referred to in the media as "Graham Turnip" or "Turnip Taylor".

Subsequent footballing ignominies were then followed by other depictions of Taylor as a vegetable; England's first game after Euro 92 ended in a 1–0 defeat to Spain, and The Sun pictured Taylor as a "Spanish onion". When he resigned, following the loss of the 1994 World Cup spot to Norway, they reverted to the turnip image, accompanying the front-page headline, "That's yer allotment".

Following Roy Hodgson's appointment, The Sun mocked his rhotacism manner of speech with a "Bwing on the Euwos!" front-page headline. The FA called the headline "unacceptable" and more than 100 people complained to the Press Complaints Commission.

=== Issues-based ===
Glenn Hoddle attracted the media spotlight for two key issues unrelated to on-the-pitch affairs. In the first, his reliance upon purported faith healer Eileen Drewery was questioned. Drewery became part of the official England staff, and players were pressured to see her, even though many of them were sceptical. Far more opprobrium was caused by Hoddle's comments about disabled people:

You and I have been physically given two hands and two legs and half-decent brains. Some people have not been born like that for a reason. The karma is working from another lifetime. I have nothing to hide about that. It is not only people with disabilities. What you sow, you have to reap.

Public opinion, based upon the immediate media furore resulted in (according to one BBC poll) 90% of respondents believing Hoddle should not continue as England coach. The BBC survey showed that while many considered his comments insensitive to the disabled, others defended his right to express his religious beliefs by claiming that to dismiss him would constitute religious discrimination.

=== Private life ===
Eriksson's private life came under scrutiny, with a number of well-publicised stories of affairs with women including Ulrika Jonsson, and FA secretary Faria Alam, despite his on-going relationship with Nancy Dell'Olio. Though Eriksson maintained in press conferences that his personal life was a private matter, his relationships with Jonsson in 2002 and Alam in 2004 were subject to tabloid headlines for several weeks.

=== Campaigns ===
The media, both broadsheet and tabloid, have sometimes campaigned for a manager to be dismissed, appointed or retained. Campaigns for managers to be dismissed have been front-page news, with eye-catching headlines including "The final ron-devouz" (for Greenwood), "In the Name of Allah Go" (for Robson), "Norse Manure" (for Taylor), and "Blair Gives Hoddle The Red Card" (for Hoddle).

Eriksson survived several scandals whilst in office, but his tenure was eventually ended when he was one of a series of celebrities targeted by a tabloid 'sting', orchestrated by The Fake Sheikh, Mazher Mahmood. Eriksson's indiscretions revealed by the newspaper "... proved the final straw for the FA", although Eriksson was permitted to stay on in the role until the end of the 2006 World Cup.

These campaigns have also sometimes backfired. Former FA chief executive, Graham Kelly recalled a campaign, orchestrated by The Sun against Bobby Robson, that began in 1984 (six years before his resignation):

The Sun was handing over "Robson Out" badges at England games as early as 1984 but the FA's then chief executive, Graham Kelly, recalled that with every press attack, his backing increased. "The irony was that just before the 1990 World Cup, the chairman, Bert Millichip, finally lost patience, let his tongue run away with him, and said that Robson either had to win the World Cup or go, and Bobby reacted by approaching PSV Eindhoven. Had this not happened, he would have served another four years, believe me."

Sections of the media have often campaigned for a particular person to be appointed England manager. At various times, but particularly during the tenure of Bobby Robson, the media campaigned for the appointment of Brian Clough. Robson once told FA chairman Bert Millichip "I'm having a rough time and everybody wants Brian – give the job to him. If he's successful, everybody's happy. If he fails, that's the end of the clamour for Brian Clough to be England manager." Robson added, "He would have ruffled a few feathers and disturbed the corridors of power but I think he would have been a good England manager. He had good judgement, knew how to design a team and was a great motivator." Terry Venables was also the subject of a media campaign for dismissal during his time as manager but was then supported by the press to return to the role in 2000.

Steve McClaren received media criticism, and, as failure to qualify for Euro 2008 looked increasingly likely, the headlines became more visceral. In January 2008, football magazine When Saturday Comes described the newspaper coverage of his final month as "relentless and remorseless". Both tabloids and broadsheets published critical pieces, with The Times headlining an editorial "Fail and McClaren has to go".

In October 2000, The Sun launched a campaign promoting a donkey as the new England manager.

== Statistical summary ==
The following table provides a summary of the complete record of each England manager including their results in the FIFA World Cup and the UEFA European Championship.

Statistics correct as of 15 July 2026

Key: Pld–Number of games played, W–Number of games won, D–Number of games drawn, L-Number of games lost, Win %–win percentage

Image	Manager	Tenure	Pld	W	D	L	Win %	Major Competitions
	Walter Winterbottom	1946–1962	139	78	33	28	56.1	1950 World Cup – Group stage 1954 World Cup – Quarter-final; 1958 World Cup – Group play-off 1960 European Nations' Cup – Did not enter 1962 World Cup – Quarter-final
	Alf Ramsey	1963–1974	113	69	27	17	61.1	1964 European Nations' Cup – Did not qualify 1966 World Cup – Champions; Euro 1968 – 3rd place 1970 World Cup – Quarter-final; Euro 1972 – Quarter-final; 1974 World Cup – Did not qualify
	Joe Mercer (caretaker)	1974	7	3	3	1	42.9	—N/a
	Don Revie	1974–1977	29	14	8	7	48.3	Euro 1976 – Did not qualify
	Ron Greenwood	1977–1982	55	33	12	10	60.0	1978 World Cup – Did not qualify Euro 1980 – Group stage 1982 World Cup – 2nd Group stage
	Bobby Robson	1982–1990	95	47	30	18	49.5	Euro 1984 – Did not qualify 1986 World Cup – Quarter-final; Euro 1988 – Group stage 1990 World Cup – 4th place
	Graham Taylor	1990–1993	38	18	13	7	47.4	Euro 1992 – Group stage 1994 World Cup – Did not qualify
	Terry Venables	1994–1996 (Note: Statistics for Terry Venables exclude the abandoned match against the Republic of Ireland on 15 February 1995)	23	11	11	1	47.8	Euro 1996 – Semi-final
	Glenn Hoddle	1996–1999	28	17	6	5	60.7	1998 World Cup – Round of 16
	Howard Wilkinson (caretaker)	1999	1	0	0	1	0.0	—N/a
	Kevin Keegan	1999–2000	18	7	7	4	38.9	Euro 2000 – Group stage
	Howard Wilkinson (caretaker)	2000	1	0	1	0	0.0	—N/a
	Peter Taylor (caretaker)	2000	1	0	0	1	0.0	—N/a
	(Sweden) Sven-Göran Eriksson	2001–2006	67	40	17	10	59.7	2002 World Cup – Quarter-final; Euro 2004 – Quarter-final; 2006 World Cup – Quarter-final
	Steve McClaren	2006–2007	18	9	4	5	50.0	Euro 2008 – Did not qualify
	(Italy) Fabio Capello	2008–2012	42	28	8	6	66.7	2010 World Cup – Round of 16
	Stuart Pearce (caretaker)	2012	1	0	0	1	0.0	—N/a
	Roy Hodgson	2012–2016	56	33	15	8	58.9	Euro 2012 – Quarter-final; 2014 World Cup – Group stage Euro 2016 – Round of 16
	Sam Allardyce	2016	1	1	0	0	100.0	—N/a
	Gareth Southgate	2016 (Note: Gareth Southgate took over as caretaker-manager, for four games, until he was formally appointed full-time on 30 November 2016.)–2024	102	61	24	17	59.8	2018 World Cup – 4th place 2019 Nations League finals – 3rd place Euro 2020 – Runners up 2022 World Cup – Quarter-final; Euro 2024 – Runners up
	(Republic of Ireland) (Note: Lee Carsley was born in Birmingham, England but represented the Republic of Ireland at international level as a player.) Lee Carsley (caretaker)	2024	6	5	0	1	83.3	—N/a
	(Germany) Thomas Tuchel	2025– (Note: Thomas Tuchel was announced as head coach on 16 October 2024, but took up the position on 1 January 2025.)	22	17	2	3	77.3	2026 World Cup – 3rd place

=== Statistical summary of British Home Championships ===
The following table provides a summary of results for each England manager in the British Home Championship, held annually until the 1983–84 season.

Key: Pld–Number of complete tournaments played, (Note: Only British Home Championships managed entirely by each manager are included) W–Number of tournaments won outright, S–Number of tournaments shared, %–outright win percentage

Manager	England career	Pld	W	S	%	Titles	Notes
Walter Winterbottom	1946–1962	16	7	7	41	1946–47, 1947–48, 1949–50, 1952–53, 1953–54, 1956–57, 1960–61	(Note: Winterbottom resigned before the completion of the 1962–63 British Home Championship)
Alf Ramsey	1963–1974	10	6	2	60	1964–65, 1965–66, 1966–67, 1967–68, 1970–71, 1972–73	(Note: Ramsey took over midway through the 1962–63 British Home Championship)
Joe Mercer	1974	1	0	1	0	—	—
Don Revie	1974–1977	3	1	0	33	1974–75	—
Ron Greenwood	1977–1982	4	3	0	75	1977–78, 1978–79, 1981–82	(Note: The 1980–81 British Home Championship was abandoned due to civil unrest in Northern Ireland)
Bobby Robson	1982–1990	2	1	0	50	1982–83	(Note: The last British Home Championship was played in 1984)
