= Adam Crozier =

Scottish businessman (born 1964)

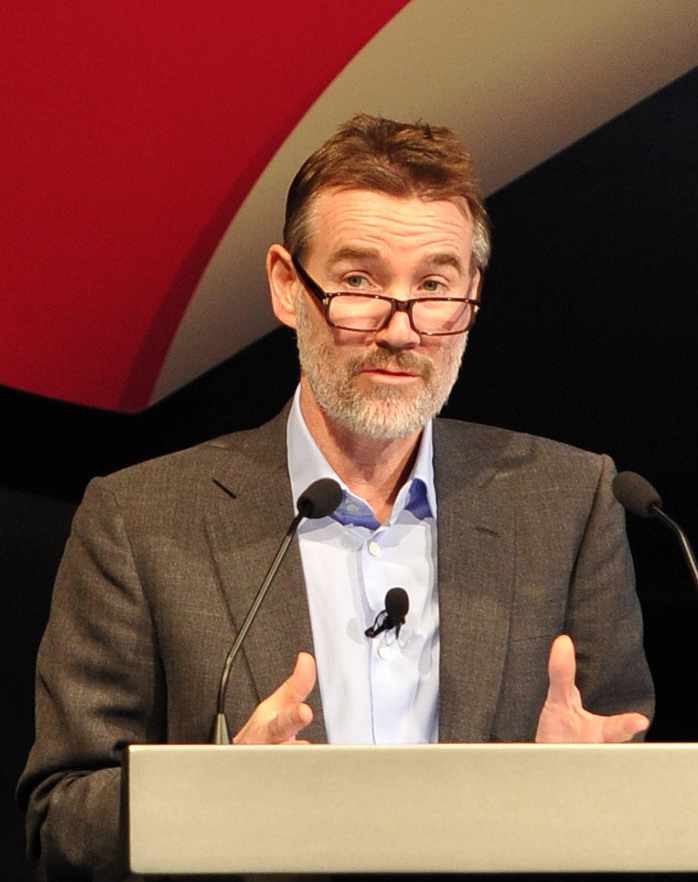
- Adam Crozier speaking at the Nations & Regions Media Conference in 2012
- Born: 26 January 1964 (age 62); Isle of Bute, Scotland
- Education: Heriot-Watt University
- Occupation: Businessman
- Years active: 1984–present
- Known for: Post Office scandal
- Title: CEO of Saatchi & Saatchi (1995–99); CEO of The FA (2000–02); CEO of Royal Mail (2003–10); CEO of ITV (2010–17); Chairman of Whitbread (2018–present); Chairman of BT Group (2021–present)
- Spouse: Annette Crozier
- Children: 2

Adam Alexander Crozier (born 26 January 1964) is a Scottish business executive and chairman of Whitbread and BT Group. He was formerly the chief executive of ITV plc. After a career at Saatchi & Saatchi culminating in the role of joint chief executive in 1995, he came to wide public prominence as the new chief executive of The Football Association in 2000, before in 2003 becoming the chief executive of the Royal Mail Group until 2010.

== Early life and education ==
Crozier was born and raised on the Isle of Bute on the west coast of Scotland in 1964. His father was a manager for Lord Bute, and his mother was secretary to the managing director of The Scotsman. Crozier went to a school in Ayr, before moving to Graeme High School, a comprehensive school in Falkirk. He graduated with a bachelor's degree in business organisation from Edinburgh's Heriot-Watt University. While at school, Crozier had trials with both Hibernian and Stirling Albion football clubs.

Crozier received an honorary doctorate from Heriot-Watt University in 2005.

== Career ==
=== Early career ===
Crozier joined Pedigree Petfoods as a graduate trainee in 1984. In 1986, he moved to The Daily Telegraph to work in media sales.

=== Saatchi & Saatchi ===
From 1988 to 1999, Crozier worked for advertising agency Saatchi and Saatchi, becoming media director in 1990, and then being appointed as joint chief executive from 1995 alongside Tamara Ingram. This occurred in the wake of the departure of the founding Saatchi brothers to form M&C Saatchi.

=== The Football Association ===
Crozier came to public attention as the surprise appointment to the role of chief executive of The Football Association, the governing body of England's national game, football, aged just 35 and having had no experience of business in football. He replaced Graham Kelly. In his short tenure from 2000 to 2002, the FA relocated headquarters from Lancaster Gate to Soho Square, appointed the first ever foreign England national team manager, Swede Sven-Göran Eriksson, and became a more commercial organisation, maximising its revenues. He also reduced the average age of the FA's staff from 55 to 32, progressed the Wembley Stadium redevelopment, and reduced the FA's ruling body from a 91-member FA Board to a committee of 12. His moves were not without criticism, with complaints from some about lack of consultation and of acting beyond his powers. He was replaced by Mark Palios.

While at the FA, Crozier reportedly identified some members of the England national team as the Golden Generation. It was a term later criticised towards the end of the decade by some England players as having been undeserved, and of causing undue expectations and pressure due to the fact they had at the time, and in years since, failed to win major tournaments.

=== Royal Mail ===
Crozier became the chief executive of the Royal Mail Group in February 2003. Entering the post, Crozier described his remit as the "biggest corporate turnaround programme in the UK". Crozier initiated a programme of modernisation and reform, to deal with changes in the service brought about by reforms beginning with the Postal Services Act 2000.

In Crozier's first three years, the Royal Mail division produced record annual profits of £537m in May 2005, making £2m a day in profits, up from £1.5m a day losses before he joined. The Group overall had been transformed from recording losses of £1.1bn at the start of the turnaround plan in 2002 into a profit of £355m in 2005. Royal Mail chairman Allan Leighton said it was a "fantastic turnaround" but also that there was still "a huge amount to do". The newly formed mail regulator Postwatch were however critical that it had failed to achieve 11 of its 15 licence targets during the previous financial year. As the postal service was opened up to competition in early 2006, Royal Mail recorded losses of £10m in 2006 and £279m in 2007.

His reforms included highly controversial large scale post office closures in the thousands, layoffs of Royal Mail staff, changes in working practices, and the ending of the second daily delivery and moving the first daily delivery to later in the day. While at the Royal Mail, Crozier's salary, one of the largest in the country for the head of a publicly owned body, was criticised in light of the changes being made to the Royal Mail workforce. Ongoing reforms eventually led to large scale industrial disputes and strike action in both 2007 and 2009 onwards.

Crozier was CEO of Royal Mail at a crucial period in the Post Office scandal when the Post Office was still part of Royal Mail, in which hundreds of sub-postmasters were falsely accused of, and prosecuted for, theft or false accounting. Prosecutions were conducted based on revenue shortfalls identified by the Post Office's Horizon computer system. These were erroneous and the result of bugs and errors in the system. Post Office officials knew about the bugs as early as 2002, but chose to continue with the prosecutions regardless.

In May 2024, the Financial Times reported that Crozier had received letters from at least four Members of Parliament about problems with the Horizon system, and their consequences for sub-postmasters, while he was at the Royal Mail. This was despite Crozier having testified under oath at the on-going Post Office Inquiry that he "was not aware of the tragic situation for Post Office sub-postmasters and their families during my time at Royal Mail."

=== ITV ===
Crozier left the Royal Mail in 2010 to become the chief executive of media group ITV plc.

ITV plc is one of three partners within ITV Network Limited, the not-for-profit organisation which runs the ITV television network, the United Kingdom's first commercial network effectively created under the Television Act 1954. Crozier was replacing Michael Grade, who announced his intention to leave in April 2009. Crozier was given the task of increasing ITV's advertising revenues which had fallen with the proliferation of new channels in the British television market. On announcing the appointment, ITV chairman Archie Norman said of Crozier that he is a "very strong leader with a great track record in delivering transformational change".

In ITV's 2023-4 docu-drama Mr Bates vs The Post Office, ITV failed to make mention of the role of Crozier in the unfolding seven years of the British Post Office scandal, prior to the reins being handed over in 2010 to his successor CEO Paula Vennells. At the time Crozier was Royal Mail CEO, the Post Office was, in effect, a division thereof.

=== Other roles ===
Crozier was also a board member of Camelot Group, the former operator of the UK National Lottery, and the Debenhams retail chain, before it was liquidated. He is also member of the President's Committee of the Confederation of British Industry (CBI). He joined the board of Whitbread in 2017, becoming a senior independent director that year. In 2018, he succeeded the retiring Richard Baker as Whitbread's chairman.

Crozier was the chairman of Vue Cinemas from 2017 to 2020, and the chair of ASOS plc from 2018 to 2021.

In February 2020, Crozier was appointed non-executive chairman of Kantar Group. In December 2021, he became chairman of BT, replacing Jan du Plessis.

== Personal life ==
Crozier is married to Annette, whom he met while working for Saatchi and Saatchi, and has two children. Despite having taken on high-profile jobs involving pressing through major upheavals, he is described as "softly spoken" and has previously said of the spotlight, "I hate it, absolutely hate it. The bizarre thing about the last three jobs I've done is that I don't like [the public profile] at all. I will go to enormous lengths not to do public things – because it is just not me."

Business positions
Preceded by Charles Scott	CEO of Saatchi & Saatchi; 1995–99; With: Tamara Ingram	Succeeded by Kevin Roberts
Preceded by Graham Kelly	CEO of The Football Association; 2000–02	Succeeded by Mark Palios
Preceded by John Roberts	CEO of Royal Mail; 2003–10	Succeeded by Moya Greene
Preceded by Michael Grade	CEO of ITV; 2010–17	Succeeded by Carolyn McCall
Preceded by Richard Baker	Chairman of Whitbread; 2018–present	Incumbent
Preceded by Jan du Plessis	Chairman of BT Group; 2021–present	Incumbent
