= Nancy Dell'Olio =

Italian-American media personality

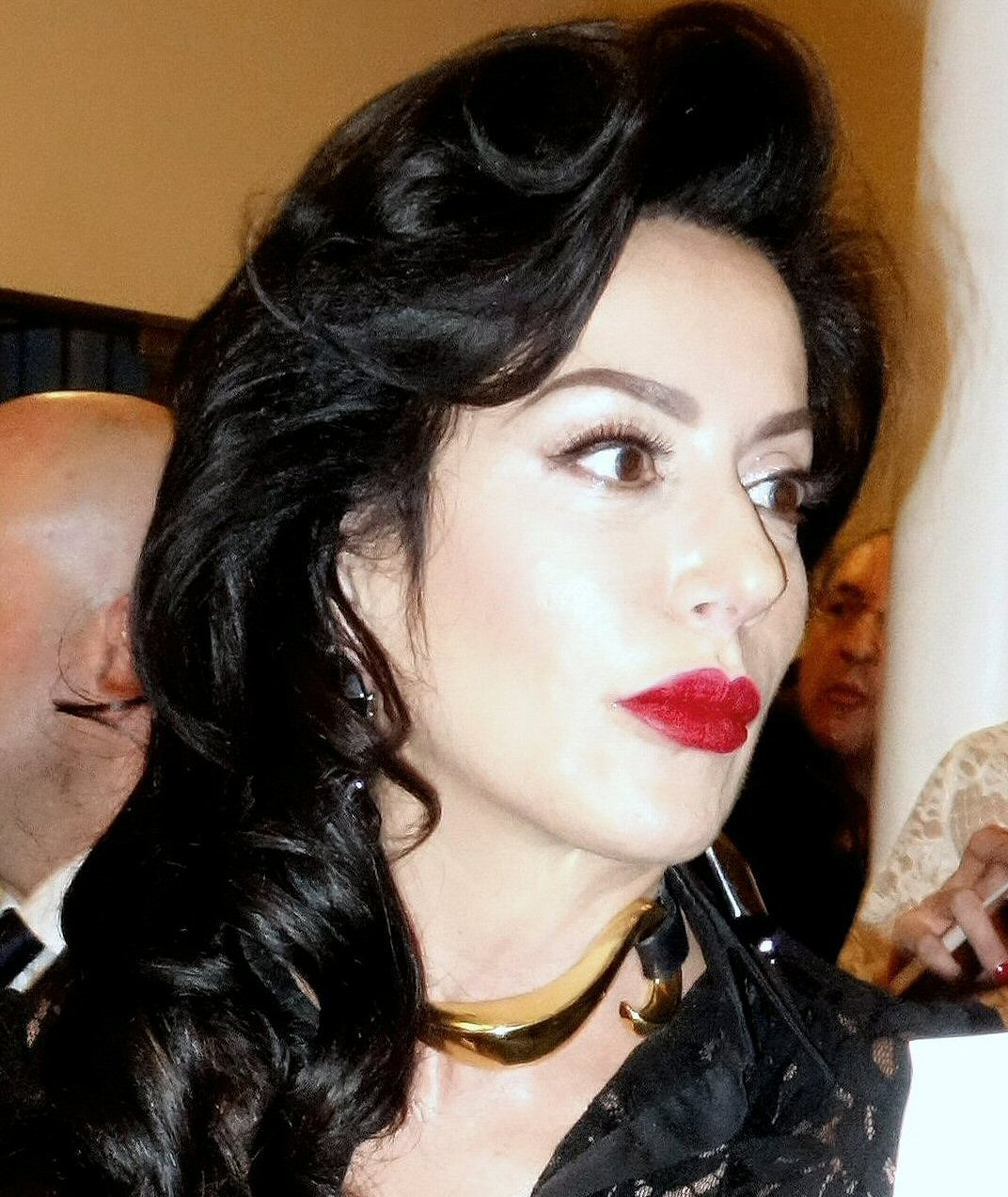
- Dell'Olio in 2014
- Born: Annunziata Dell'Olio; New York City, U.S.
- Occupation: Lawyer
- Television: Strictly Come Dancing (2011); Celebrity Big Brother (2016)
- Partner: Sven-Göran Eriksson (1998–2007)

Annunziata "Nancy" Dell'Olio is an Italian-American lawyer and media personality. She first came to public notice as the girlfriend of football manager Sven-Göran Eriksson.

== Early life ==
Annunziata Dell'Olio was born in New York City to a Jewish mother and a Catholic father, and is the eldest of four children. When she was five her family moved back to Italy, to the town of Bisceglie in the Province of Barletta-Andria-Trani and region of Apulia.

== Education and early career ==
Dell'Olio studied law at the University of Bari. She later gained a master's degree from New York University. In 1990, Dell'Olio married Giancarlo Mazza and established her own legal practice, specialising in property law.

== Projects ==
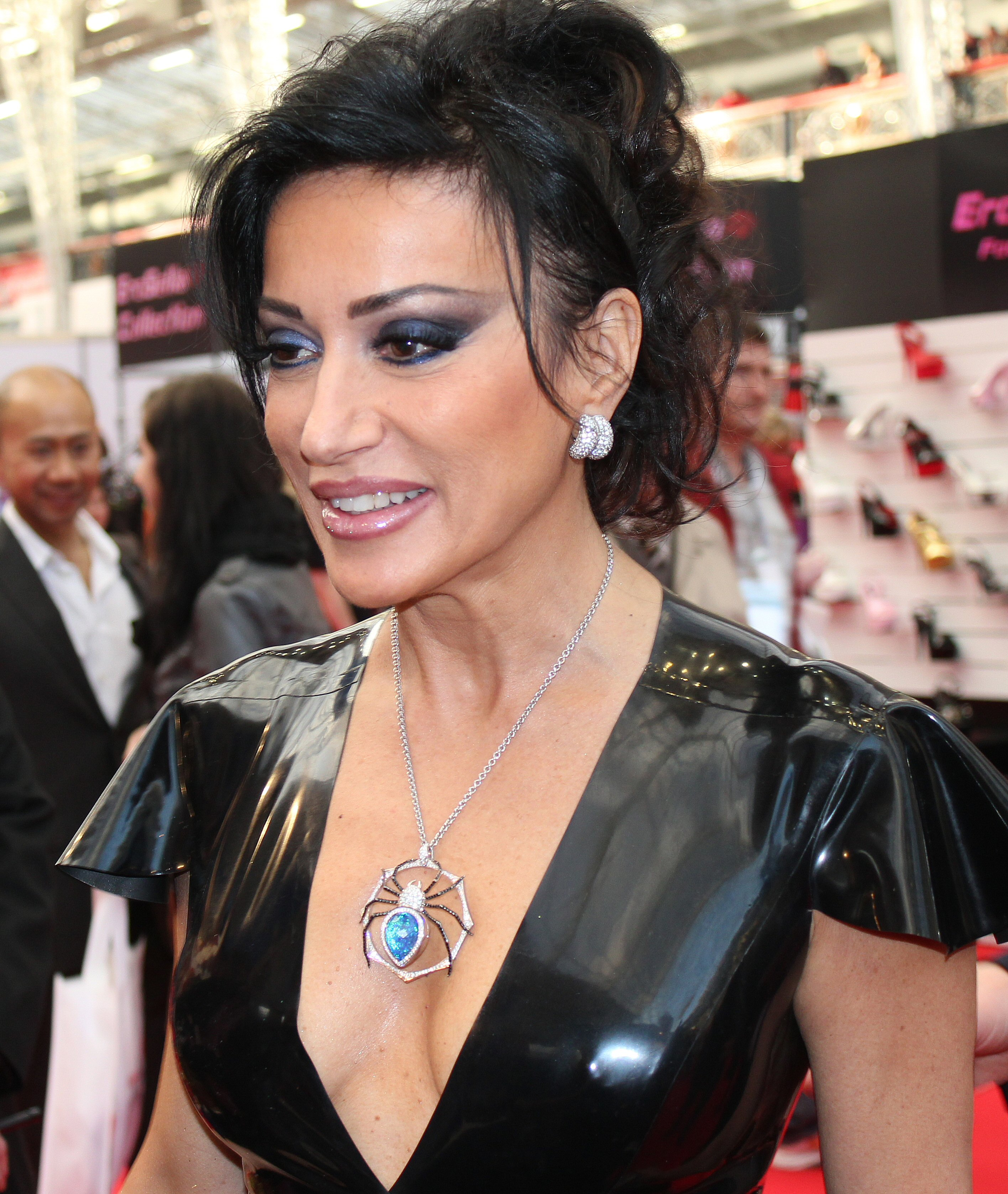
Dell'Olio, London, November 2011

In June 2005, Dell'Olio hosted the show Footballers' Cribs on MTV. She gave viewers tours of the luxury homes of English football players. "Nancy is a dream signing for us," said series executive producer Sean Murphy. "She's the first lady of football, so is in the perfect position to give us a real insider's view."

In June 2007, Dell'Olio had an autobiography published titled My Beautiful Game.

In December 2008, Dell'Olio was interviewed on the BBC news analysis programme Newsnight to talk about a new range of lingerie she was launching but, according to interviewer Jeremy Paxman, "I haven't the faintest idea what you're talking about".

In September 2011, Dell'Olio took part in the ninth series of BBC1 show Strictly Come Dancing. On 30 October, she and partner Anton du Beke were eliminated. The Daily Telegraph reported that Dell'Olio clod hopped around the show. Dell'Olio reported it as "The best season Strictly ever had; everyone say so".

Nancy Dell'Olio appeared on 8 Out of 10 Cats in season 15 episode 9 on March 29 2013.

Dell'Olio presented her own one woman show, co scripted by comedian Diane Spencer, called Rainbows from Diamonds at the Edinburgh Fringe in 2014.

In 2016 she competed in the seventeenth series of Celebrity Big Brother. She became the second housemate to be evicted on Day 11.

In a January 2016 interview with the Daily Telegraph she stated that she was starting her own brand of limoncello. Dell'Olio aimed to start her new company through crowd funding investment, though only €1,865 of the required €70,000 was raised. The project went ahead. Dell'Olio's aim was not to be involved in the day-to-day running of the company, but only to act as ambassador for it.

in January 2022 she appeared on Channel 4's Celebrity Coach Trip partnered with singer Chesney Hawkes.

In August 2022, she appeared on Celebrity Masterchef, becoming the first contestant to be eliminated in her heat.

== Charity works ==
Dell'Olio has visited British Red Cross projects in the United Kingdom and in Kenya. She stated, "I have always been a great admirer of the principles and values behind the work of the Red Cross. The thing that really impressed me is that the Red Cross seems to go everywhere, more than any other charity."

Dell'Olio is the chairwoman of Truce International, the British-based charity she founded with Eriksson, which aims to use football as a means of uniting people in areas affected by war. Dell'Olio is a member of the Accademia Apulia UK.

== Personal life ==
In May 1998, Dell'Olio was introduced to Sven-Göran Eriksson, the manager of the Lazio football team, and they began a relationship six months later. In January 2001, Eriksson became manager of the England team, and he and Dell'Olio relocated to London. In the beginning of 2002, Eriksson had a short-lived affair with television presenter Ulrika Jonsson, but he returned to Dell'Olio. When he died in August 2024, Dell'Olio paid an emotional tribute to him.

In August 2004, Eriksson had an affair with The Football Association secretary Faria Alam. As Alam had also had an affair with FA CEO, Mark Palios, when the media got hold of the story, it became high profile and made leading headlines in newspapers and on television. Dell'Olio was upset, but chose to stay with Eriksson. The couple eventually split up in August 2007.

As of May 2011, Dell'Olio was in a relationship with Sir Trevor Nunn, but by the end of the year, it was reported the relationship had ended. In December 2011, she lost a High Court libel action against Associated Newspapers, publishers of the newspaper Daily Mail, over an article that referred to her as a "man eater".
