= Faria Alam =

Former Football Association secretary (born 1966)

- Born: 13 February 1966 (age 60); Dhaka, East Pakistan
- Education: Ponteland High School
- Known for: Former Football Association secretary

Faria Alam (born 13 February 1966) is a former Football Association secretary.

== Early life ==
Alam was born in Dhaka, but raised in the United Kingdom. Her family emigrated to the UK, living in Manchester, Bradford, Newcastle upon Tyne, and London.

When Alam was 19 years old, her mother took her to Bangladesh and arranged a marriage to a doctor. Alam divorced and returned to England.

== Football Association ==
After modelling and working as an administrator, in July 2003, Alam took a job as personal assistant to executive director David Davies at The Football Association, based at the organisation's headquarters in Soho Square, London.

Alam began a brief relationship with chief executive Mark Palios. When the relationship with Palios ended, she had an affair with then England football team manager Sven-Goran Eriksson. At the time Eriksson was in a relationship with Nancy Dell'Olio, though shortly before he had had an affair with TV presenter Ulrika Jonsson. As Eriksson and Dell'Olio were often photographed, interviewed, and reported on in the media, when Alam's affairs came to the attention of the public in August 2004, a media scrum ensued and she resigned her post.

On leaving her job with the FA, Alam hired publicity agent Max Clifford. After negotiations, Clifford and Alam posed for photographs outside Clifford's New Bond Street offices surrounded by a scrum of photographers. Clifford brokered a number of deals for Alam, who was reportedly paid £400,000 for publication of kiss-and-tell stories about Palios and Eriksson in The Mail on Sunday and The News of the World. Alam was paid a further £150,000 for a television interview.

In October 2004, Alam made claims against the Football Association of sexual harassment, unfair dismissal, and breach of contract. In September 2005, her claims were rejected by an industrial tribunal.

In 2013, Alam testified in the News International phone hacking scandal; her phone had been hacked by Glenn Mulcaire, a private investigator working on behalf of the News of the World, in June 2004.

== Celebrity Big Brother ==
In January 2006, Alam appeared on Celebrity Big Brother. On 17 January 2006, while up for the public vote, she commented that the public would "never let a black or Asian win" the show on the basis that the British establishment and/or media would not permit it. On 18 January 2006, she became the second housemate to be evicted.

== Film work ==
In 2006, Alam played a hitwoman in the film Cash and Curry. In an interview she said of the role: "It was a role that presented itself to me and I took it on as one of life’s experiences".

== See also ==
- British Bangladeshi
- List of British Bangladeshis
