= Dingley Dell F.C. =

Dingley Dell
- Full name: Dingley Dell Football Club
- Nicknames: The Dellers, D.D., the Templars
- Founded: 1858
- Dissolved: 1864
- Ground: Only played away matches
- Captain: George Sills

Dingley Dell Football Club was a short-lived English association football club based in the London area in the late 1850s and early 1860s.

== History ==
Dingley Dell F.C. was founded by members of the Dingley Dell cricket club, which was named after the cricket team in a fictitious village described in The Pickwick Papers by Charles Dickens. The club's captain, lawyer George Turner Sills, had formed a side at the start of 1858 made up mostly of students from the University of Cambridge, which played at Westminster School in February. The majority of players were members of Lincoln's Inn.

The Dingley Dell club played its first match against Westminster School at Vincent Square on 24 November 1858 in the earliest known football fixture in the London area. The side included at least two players (the Rev. Bonner and W. Williams) who played in Sills' Cambridge XI side at the start of the year. The club was the most active non-school team in the London area in the five years before the Football Association was established in 1863, and was considered the strongest non-public school club in 1862.

The club's earliest games were all played against Westminster or Charterhouse schools. The matches included one against Westminster, under the name of G. Sills' XI, which took place over two days.

=== Matches under Dingley Dell rules ===
On 15 February 1862, the club played Surbiton F.C., in the first known match between selective clubs, rather than school or work entities. As this match pre-dated the Football Association, the rules were open to negotiation, and the match was played under the Dingley Dell rules, which banned the carrying of the ball, and had goals scored by kicking the ball under a tape.

Three days later, the club played the War Office, which was also a founder member of the Football Association under the name Civil Service F.C., at Beaufort House, winning 1–0; this was presumably under Dingley Dell rules. On 22 February 1862, 12 members of the club played Harrow School under the latter's rules, losing by 2 bases to 0, due to "an insufficient knowledge of the rules of the Harrow game". Over the 1861–62 season, the club's record was played 12, won 3, drawn 4, and lost 5.

The club suffered a blow before the start of the 1862–63 season when an accident meant Sills was forced to retire. The club had an active season, perhaps with fixtures already arranged at the start; however, the club was not represented at the initial Football Association meeting at Freemasons' Tavern on 26 October 1863, when the FA was formed; however, Theodore Bell of Surbiton may have been a de facto representative of the club.

=== Football Association ===
The formation of the Football Association, and implementation of a set of laws that were similar to the Dingley Dell laws, seemed to have taken away some of the need for a club described as "the M.C.C. of football" (in reference to being a force for implementing a common set of rules); also Sills' incapacity, plus the formation of other clubs, contributed to the club falling out of the regular fixture round. The club is known to have played only played three reported matches after the Association rules were implemented and it was not a member of the FA. The club's final reported fixture was against Westminster School on 11 February 1864, which was the first game of the season for which Sills was fit enough to play. The club seems to have ceased to exist after that, with at least four regular players (R.D. Cleasby, G.A.Paley, and the Wharton brothers) playing for the Crusaders club later in February.

== Dingley Dell rules ==
Although no full record of the Dingley Dell rules survives, in December 1861, Bell's Life magazine published a letter from "D.D." setting out the following:

First, then, football is essentially a game for the feet, hands, therefore ought to be used no more than is strictly necessary.

2. The game is of itself dangerous enough, and all such practices as tripping up, pushing with the hands, ”hacking”, and wild and indiscriminate kicking, ought to be carefully avoided.

3. When a ball is kicked out of bounds it ought to be returned, so as to alter the state of the game as little as possible. It ought, therefore, to be kicked back from the point at which it left the ground, and in a direction perpendicular to that side of the ground.

4. All sneaking and standing off one’s side ought to be strictly prohibited.

I think, sir, that the above fundamental principles are quite sufficient to base a proper set of rules upon, for it follows from No 1 that the ball must never be stopped by the hand when it can be stopped in any other way; that the ball must never be picked up, carried, or guided by the hand; and that when the ball is so high that it cannot be stopped in any other way, it may be stopped by one hand or two, but ought to be dropped at once on the ground.

Moreover, the goal must be kicked under, and not over, the string, as there would be otherwise no chance of kicking a goal at all.

Nos 2 and 3 speak for themselves.

No 4 may be enforced by requiring a certain number of players of the opposite side to be between a kicker and the goal which he is endeavouring to reach, or by not allowing a man to kick a ball which has last been kicked by one of his own side, unless either he was standing behind the kicker at the time the kick was made, or some one of the opposite side first touches the ball.

Football is becoming so popular in England, and is so thoroughly manly, and, therefore, English, that every facility, and every encouragement ought to be given to the practice of the game; and I think that the movement ought to be taken up by the public schools, for they are the nurseries of the game, and in fact, the only places, excepting the Universities where the game is regularly and systematically played. I have no doubt that any set of rules agreed upon by the public schools would be at once adopted by all clubs, and it would be easy for the captains of the elevens to communicate with each other and make the necessary arrangements."

By 1862, the Dingley Dell rules had settled the number on each side as 11, and included a rule on corner-kicks.
