= Richard Baker (British businessman, born 1962) =

British businessman

- Born: 6 August 1962 (age 64)
- Education: Downing College, Cambridge
- Occupation: Businessman

Richard Baker (born 6 August 1962) was CEO of Boots Group from 2003 to 2007. He has since served on a number of executive boards and launched private equity firm BD-Capital.

== Early life and education ==
Baker graduated from Downing College, Cambridge.

== Career ==
Baker worked at Mars Confectionery for nearly 10 years, working his way up to sales and marketing director. He joined Asda Stores Ltd in 1995, where he worked for nine years, becoming Marketing Director in 1999, and ultimately chief operating officer in 2002, following their acquisition by Walmart.

In September 2003, Baker joined Boots Group as chief executive officer. The company had been reporting losses following its ill-advised move into its 'Wellbeing' services. Despite implementing a number of cost-cutting measures and extending opening hours, the company continued to struggle until October 2005 it announced it was to merge with competitor Alliance Unichem. The announcement met with widespread opposition, but the merger was cleared by the OFT in February 2006 and completed in July that year. Baker became chief executive officer of the new Alliance Boots GmbH.

In April 2007, after publishing annual results that showed a profit increase of 7.4%, Alliance Boots was sold to private equity firm KKR for £11.1 billion; the highest price ever paid by a private equity company for a British public company. Baker left the company on completion of the transaction.

From 2008 to 2014, Baker served as non-executive chairman of Virgin Active. From 2009 to 2017, he served as chairman of the European Division of Groupe Aeroplan. From 2010 to 2018, he served as chairman of DFS. From 2014 to 2018, he served as non-executive director of Whitbread.

In June 2019, Baker launched his own private equity firm, BD-Capital.

Business positions
Preceded by Steve Russell	Chief Executive of Boots UK; 2003–2007	Succeeded by Stefano Pessina (Executive Chairman)
Preceded by Anthony Habgood	Chairman of Whitbread; 2014–2018	Succeeded by Adam Crozier
