= John Banham =

British businessman (1940–2022)

Sir John Banham
- Born: John Michael Middlecott Banham; 22 August 1940; Torquay, Devon, England
- Died: 9 August 2022 (aged 81); Penzance, Cornwall, England
- Education: Charterhouse School
- Alma mater: Queens' College, Cambridge
- Occupation: Businessman
- Title: Chairman of Whitbread; Chairman of ECI Ventures; Chairman of Johnson Matthey; Chairman of Tarmac; Chairman of Kingfisher plc

Sir John Michael Middlecott Banham DL (22 August 1940 – 9 August 2022) was a British businessman. He was the chairman of the major brewer Whitbread from 2000 to 2005, and also chairman of ECI Ventures and Johnson Matthey.

== Life and career ==
John Michael Middlecott Banham was born in Torquay, Devon, England on 22 August 1940. He was raised in Cornwall, where his father worked as a surgeon and his mother as a National Health Service (NHS) administrator, and was educated at Charterhouse School, and Queens' College, Cambridge, where he gained a first class degree in Natural Sciences. He worked at the Foreign Office for two years before moving to Reed International and then McKinsey and Co.

Banham was an avid sailor, participating in the 1979 Fastnet race, on a Contessa 34 when the yacht was hit by Force 11 winds some 90 miles off Land’s End. Of the 303 starting yachts, 80 had to be saved, 24 were abandoned (of which two were retrieved) at least 75 boats capsized and five sank. Running before the storm, and navigated by a submariner, the boat managed to make its way unaided to Milford Haven.

He was the first controller of the Audit Commission from 1983 to 1987, and was then Director General of the Confederation of British Industry from 1987 to 1992. In 1992 he became chairman of the Local Government Commission for England that led to a large-scale local government reform in England. He was knighted in the 1992 New Year Honours.

Banham was chairman of Tarmac from 1994 to 1999, and the chairman of Kingfisher plc from 1995 to 2001. He became the chairman of Johnson Matthey in April 2006. He has also acted as chairman of West Country Television and as a non-executive director of both National Westminster Bank and National Power.

In 1987, he was awarded an honorary doctorate from the University of Bath, and an honorary fellowship from Queens'. Banham was an active freemason. He was a deputy lieutenant of Cornwall.

Banham died from Alzheimer's disease and Guillain–Barré syndrome at a care home in Penzance, on 9 August 2022, less than two weeks before his 82nd birthday.

Political offices
Preceded by Terence Beckett	Director of the Confederation of British Industry; 1987–1992	Succeeded by Howard Davies
Business positions
Preceded by	Chairman of Kingfisher plc 1995–2001	Succeeded by
Preceded by	Chairman of Whitbread; 2000–2005	Succeeded by Anthony Habgood
