= Surbiton F.C. =

Surbiton
- Full name: Surbiton Football Club
- Founded: 1862
- Dissolved: 1863
- Ground: Surbiton Cricket Ground

Surbiton Football Club was a short-lived English association football club based in the London suburb of Surbiton, founded by members of Kingston Rowing Club. It was a founder member of the Football Association.

== History ==
The club's first recorded football match against external opposition was a 0–0 draw at home to Dingley Dell F.C. on 15 February 1862. As this match pre-dated the foundation of the Football Association, it was played with ten men per side to the rules set out by the Dingley Dell club, which banned the carrying of the ball, and in which goals were scored by kicking the ball under a tape.

At the end of the 1861–62 season, the club changed its name to Kingston F.C. and appears to have played only one external match under that name, a 1–0 win against Dingley Dell in November 1862, the goal being scored by A. H. Mowbray.

=== Foundation of the Football Association ===
The club (under the name Surbiton once more) was represented by Theodore Bell (1840–1923), formerly captain of football at Uppingham School, and secretary of the Rowing Club, at the 'Meeting of the Captains' at the Freemasons' Tavern on 26 October 1863. Bell may also have 'doubled up' and represented both Surbiton and Dingley Dell). By the time the club was a founder member of the FA, it had changed its name back to Surbiton, but does not seem to have played a match under the FA laws.

== Colours ==
There is no record of the club's colours, if any. The Football Association rules required clubs to register their colours, suggesting that by 1863 there was a need to distinguish players on the field. The Kingston Rowing Club's colours were red and white hooped shirts so it is possible that the Surbiton players wore those for football matches, or possibly plain red caps to match the oars.

== Notable players ==
Three Surbiton players, C.C. (Charles) Mowbray, A. Wilson, and G. Cardale, were part of the Kingston Rowing Club eights that won the Grand Challenge Cup at the Henley Regatta in 1864.
