= Anthony Habgood =

British businessman (born 1946)

Sir Anthony Habgood
- Born: Anthony John Habgood; 8 November 1946 (age 79); Norfolk, England
- Education: Gresham's School; Gonville and Caius College, Cambridge; Carnegie Mellon University
- Occupation: Businessman
- Years active: 1970–2022
- Spouse: Nancy Atkinson (m. 1974)
- Children: 3

Sir Anthony John Habgood (born 8 November 1946) is a British businessman. From 1991 to 2005, he was chief executive of Bunzl. He was also the chairman of Whitbread from 2005 to 2014, of RELX Group and of the Court of the Bank of England. He was described in the Financial Times as "the City's go-to grandee."

== Early life ==
Anthony John Habgood was born on 8 November 1946, the son of John Michael Habgood MC and his wife, Margaret Diana Middleton, née Dalby.

Habgood was educated at Gresham's School, Norfolk. He studied for a bachelor's degree at Gonville and Caius College, Cambridge, and for a master's degree in industrial administration at Carnegie Mellon University.

== Career ==
Habgood joined Boston Consulting Group in 1970, after a summer job there, and became a director in 1977. He worked in Boston, Tokyo, Munich and London. From 1981 to 1986 he was Managing Partner of BCG Ltd in London and a member of the executive committee of BCG Inc.

He joined Tootal Group plc in 1986, and became Chief Executive in 1991.

From 1991 to 2005, Habgood was chief executive, then chairman of Bunzl, growing turnover from continuing operations from £500 million to £2.9 billion, and improving profits by a factor of 34, and "is widely credited with transforming Bunzl".

Habgood was also chairman of

- Whitbread plc from 2005 to 2014
- Mölnlycke Health Care from 2006 to 2007 while it was owned by the private equity house APAX Partners.
- RELX Group (formerly Reed Elsevier), a multinational information and analytics company, from June 2009 until 2021.
- Preqin Holding Limited from 2011 to 2022.

Past non-executive directorships include NatWest Bank plc, Powergen plc and Marks and Spencer plc.

He was senior non-executive director of Norfolk and Norwich University Hospitals NHS Foundation Trust from 2006 until March 2013, and was chair of Norwich Research Park between March 2013 and March 2016.

Habgood was Chair of Court at the Bank of England between July 2014 and June 2018.

=== Recognition ===
Habgood was appointed a Knight Bachelor in the 2018 New Year Honours for services to UK Industry.

=== Views ===
Habgood has said that

- Businesses should focus on customers.
- A key factor in business strategy is determining which elements of a group portfolio have good growth characteristics, and focusing on these.
- As chair he usually spent a lot of time with the CEO and company secretary setting the agenda and deciding what they wanted the board papers to help them to achieve.

Habgood has mentioned Christopher Hogg as the chairman he most admired, and Michael Brearley (the England cricket captain between 1977 and 1981) as a leadership hero.

== Personal life ==
On 29 May 1974, Habgood married Nancy Atkinson, the daughter of Ray Nelson Atkinson of San Mateo, California, US. They have three children, and split their time between Chelsea and Norfolk.

Business positions
Preceded by John Banham	Chairman of Whitbread; 2005–2014	Succeeded by Richard Baker
