= Tamara Ingram =

British businesswoman (born 1960)

Tamara Ingram OBE
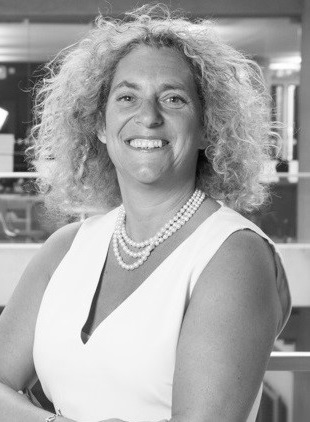
- Born: Tamara Ingram; 1 October 1960 (age 65); London, England
- Education: Queen's College, London; University of East Anglia
- Occupations: Advertising & Marketing
- Known for: WPP Group; Grey Global Group; Kantar Group; McCann Erickson; Saatchi & Saatchi

Tamara Ingram, OBE (born 1 October 1960) is a British businesswoman. Tamara is currently chairman of integrated content agency The 10 Group, Asthma and Lung UK, Chair of the ESG committee as a NED for Marks and Spencer and non executive director of Intertek and Marsh Mclennan.

== Early life and education ==
Ingram was born in London to John Michael Ingram, an influential British fashion designer, and Sonia Leila Ingram, a psychotherapist. She attended Queen's College, London, and subsequently the University of East Anglia, graduating with an honours degree in English and American Studies in 1982.

== Career ==
=== Early career ===
Ingram joined Saatchi & Saatchi in 1985, where she remained for 16 years, becoming CEO in 1995 and executive chairman in 1999. Under her leadership, Saatchi & Saatchi became one of the most-awarded advertising agencies, including being named Cannes Agency of the Year.

In 2001 Ingram left Saatchi & Saatchi to join McCann Erickson as chairman and chief executive officer. She then joined Kantar as president of three of their marketing firms: Added Value, The Henley Centre & Fusion5.

=== Grey and P&G ===
In 2005 WPP acquired the Grey Global Group, bringing a large amount of Procter & Gamble's business into the group's remit. Due to her strong relationship with P&G, Ingram joined Grey London as Group CEO, subsequently taking on the dual roles of president and CEO of Team P+G, responsible for the Procter and Gamble relationship throughout the WPP Group.

=== WPP ===
In May 2015, Ingram was promoted to Chief Client Team Officer of WPP overseeing all of WPP's global accounts comprising more than a third of WPP's almost $20billion revenue.

=== Other interests ===
In addition to her advertising and marketing career, Ingram has held numerous public and private sector directorships. She is currently a Trustee of Save the Children and the Royal Drawing School.

Between 2001 and 2011 she served as chairman of Visit London, and in 2011 was appointed an OBE for services to tourism through her work with the organisation. She has also sat on the boards of EDF Energy, the Sage Group, the London Development Agency, the British Tourist Authority, the Almeida Theatre and the Royal Court Theatre.

Ingram is currently a member of The Marketing Society, the Marketing Group of Great Britain, Women in Advertising and Communications London (WACL), and Advertising Women of New York (AWNY). She is also a board member of the Ad Council and on the board of directors for Effie Worldwide.

In 2006 Ingram was shortlisted for the Veuve Clicquot Business Woman of the Year Award and in 2007 was named 'Woman to Watch' by Advertising Age.

Ingram is an avid tennis player, and has won the London Highbury Fields Tennis Tournament with Daniel Brachfeld in 2009 and 2010.
