= Graham Kelly (football administrator) =

English football administrator, born 1945

- Born: 23 December 1945 (age 80); Blackpool, England
- Occupation: Association football administrator
- Known for: Secretary of The Football League (1978–1989); Chief executive of The Football Association (1989–1998)

Graham Kelly (born 23 December 1945) is an English football administrator.

He was secretary of The Football League from 1978 to 1989 and chief executive of The Football Association (FA) from 1989 to 1998. He resigned from The Football Association in December 1998, along with chairman Keith Wiseman, when a scandal broke out over an allegedly improper loan of £3.2 million from the FA to the Football Association of Wales (FAW).

It was alleged that the loan was intended to buy the FAW’s support for the election of Wiseman as a vice-president of FIFA, which would in turn help England’s bid to host the 2006 FIFA World Cup, which was ultimately unsuccessful as the event was awarded to Germany in July 2000. After an investigation was conducted by FIFA in 1999, Kelly and Wiseman were cleared of any wrongdoing.
