= Mark Palios =

English footballer and football administrator (born 1952)

Personal information
- Full name: Markos Palios
- Date of birth: 9 November 1952 (age 74)
- Place of birth: Liverpool, England
- Position: Midfielder

Senior career*
Years	Team	Apps	(Gls)
1973–1980	Tranmere Rovers	190	(25)
1980–1983	Crewe Alexandra	118	(23)
1983–1985	Tranmere Rovers	59	(7)
1985–1986	Southport	6	
- Bangor City
- * Club domestic league appearances and goals

Markos Palios (born 9 November 1952) is an English chartered accountant, football administrator and former professional footballer. In August 2014, it was announced that he and his wife Nicola were taking ownership of Tranmere Rovers F.C., where he had once been a player.

== Playing career ==
Palios played in the Football League as a midfielder for Tranmere Rovers for nine years and Crewe Alexandra for three years. In 1981-82 he was Crewe leading goalscorer. In the latter part of his career he played as captain in the European Cup-Winners' Cup for Welsh club Bangor City. In total he made over 400 League appearances and continued playing non-league football for many years after his professional retirement. Whilst playing in a friendly amateur game in 2001 Palios was elbowed in the chest and suffered a double cardiac arrest, but recovered and went on to resume playing football until the age of 58.

== Post-playing career ==
Unusually for a footballer, Palios was permitted by his clubs to pursue a career as an accountant, whilst remaining a professional player. He developed a successful career as a chartered accountant with Arthur Young and ultimately became a senior partner at PricewaterhouseCoopers, specialising in business turnaround. In 2003, he was voted Turnaround Financier of the Year by the Turnaround Finance Group, and given a Lifetime Achievement Award. He then changed direction, resigning from PwC to become the Football Association's chief executive in July 2003, where he sought to apply his business skills in the field of sports governance. One of his priority tasks was to stabilise The FA's perilous financial situation, by resolving the financing of the Wembley Stadium project. He saved The FA from having to borrow a further $230 million, which would have put the whole organisation into financial jeopardy. Other successes at The FA included the successful overhaul of the disciplinary process, which resulted in speedier hearings and lower costs. Palios was not frightened to take tough decisions including a decision to ban Rio Ferdinand from the England team to play against Turkey in a crucial European Championship qualifier in 2004, for failing to take a drugs test despite widespread pressure from the remainder of the team, who threatened to go on strike but ultimately backed down.

Palios resigned in August 2004, following media revelations around his brief relationship with a Football Association secretary, Faria Alam, who subsequently went on to have an affair with the England manager Sven-Göran Eriksson. Although a single man at the time of his relationship and strongly maintaining that he had done nothing wrong, he resigned in order to protect his five children from the huge media attention that accompanied the revelations of Alam. Many senior FA members were disappointed with his decision to resign and have described him as being "the best FA CEO in recent years" and having "...the focused approach and financial skills to sort out the blazers and...excellent interpersonal skills". He then returned to work as a consultant in the business-turnaround sphere and until January 2009 was a non-executive director of AdEPT Telecom. He was a non-executive director of the British Judo Association until 2016 and a member of the Audit Committee at Surrey County Cricket Club, and has a particular interest in sports governance.

Since 2009, Palios has been appearing regularly on television and radio as a commentator on a wide range of sports related issues including football finances, premiership salaries, the England team's performance in the 2010 World Cup and England's failed bid for the 2018 World Cup. Palios married Nicola in 2009 and they live on the Wirral.

On 11 August 2014, it was announced that Palios and his wife were taking a controlling interest in Tranmere Rovers F.C., from outgoing chairman Peter Johnson. Mark Palios would become executive chairman of the club, with Nicola as vice-chairman, and Johnson becoming honorary president.

In July 2018, Palios and MP Justin Madders opened the pitches at Vauxhall Motors sports and social club. The project has received a £541,413 grant from the Premier League and The FA Facilities Fund.
