= The Football Association =

Governing body of association football in England

UEFA
- Coat of arms of the Football Association
- Short name: The FA
- Founded: 26 October 1863; 163 years ago
- Headquarters: Wembley Stadium
- Location: Wembley, London
- FIFA affiliation: 1905–1920; 1924–1928; 1946–present
- UEFA affiliation: 15 June 1954; 72 years ago
- IFAB affiliation: 1886
- Patron: William, Prince of Wales
- Website: thefa.com

The Football Association (the FA) is the governing body of association football in England and the Crown Dependencies of Jersey, Guernsey and the Isle of Man. Formed in 1863, it is the oldest football association in the world and is responsible for overseeing all aspects of the amateur and professional game in its territory.

The FA facilitates all competitive football matches within its remit at national level, and indirectly at local level through the county football associations. It runs numerous competitions, the most famous of which is the FA Cup. It is also responsible for appointing the management of the men's, women's, and youth national football teams.

The FA is a member of both UEFA and FIFA and holds a permanent seat on the International Football Association Board (IFAB) which is responsible for the Laws of the Game. As the first football association, it does not use the national name "English" in its title. The FA is based at Wembley Stadium in London. The FA is a member of the British Olympic Association, meaning that the FA has control over the men's and women's Great Britain Olympic football team.

All of England's professional football teams are members of the Football Association. Although it does not run the day-to-day operations of the Premier League, it has veto power over the appointment of the league chairman and chief executive and over any changes to league rules. The English Football League, made up of the three fully professional divisions below the Premier League, is self-governing, subject to the FA's sanctions.

== History ==
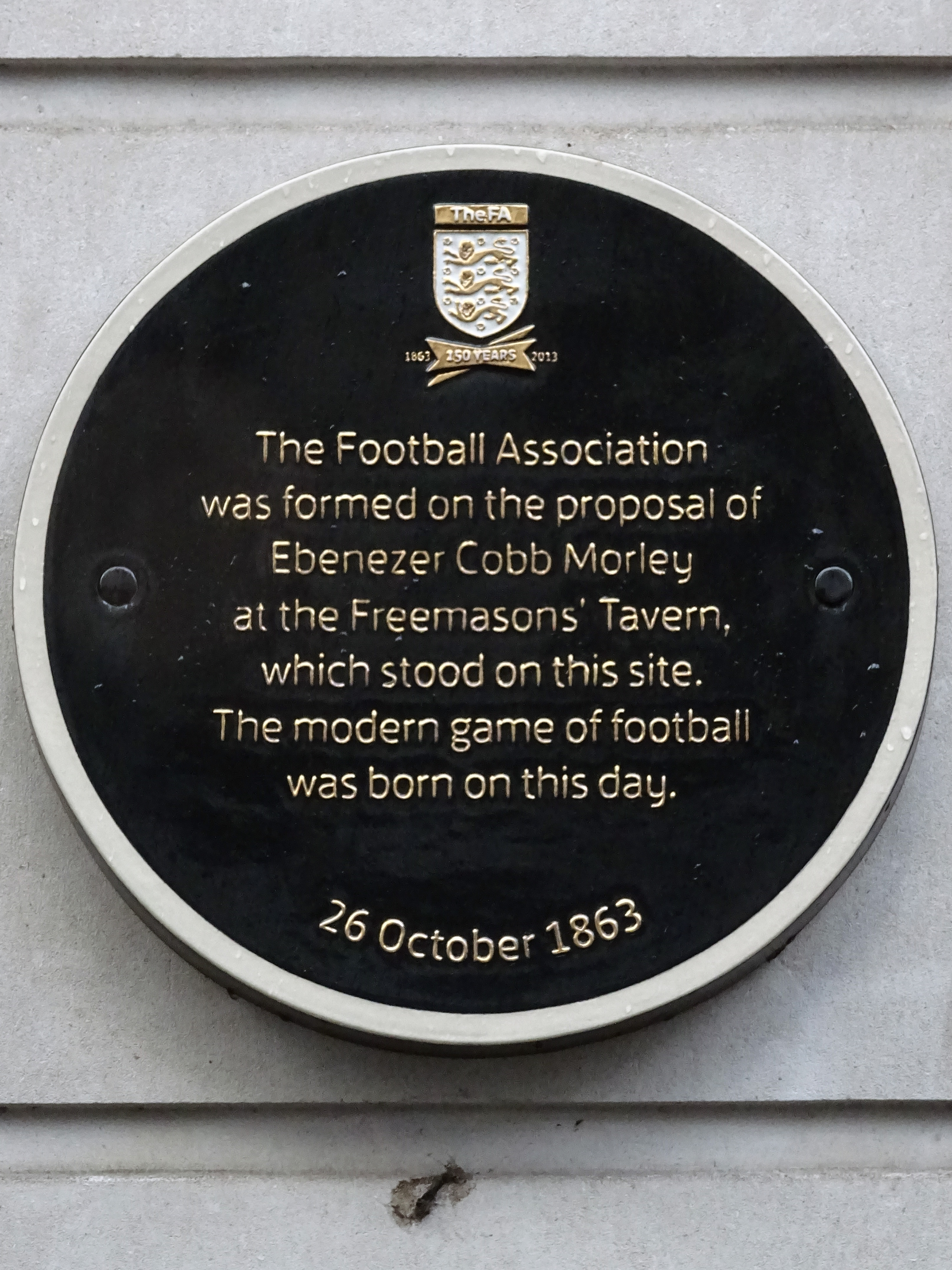
Plaque commemorating the formation of the Football Association in 1863 at the Freemasons' Tavern in London

It was in England where the first official Association with clear rules was formed. For centuries before the first meeting of the Football Association in the Freemasons' Tavern in Great Queen Street, London on 26 October 1863, there were no universally accepted rules for playing football. In 1862, Ebenezer Cobb Morley, as captain of Barnes, wrote to Bell's Life newspaper proposing a governing body for the sport "with the object of establishing a definite code of rules for the regulation of the game"; the letter led to the first meeting at The Freemasons' Tavern that created the FA in 1863. Morley was a founding member. Six meetings near London's Covent Garden, at 81–82 Long Acre, ended in a split between the Association football and Rugby football. Both of them had their own uniforms, rituals, gestures and highly formalised rules.

In public school games, the rules were formalised according to local conditions; but when the schoolboys reached university, chaos ensued when the players used different rules, so members of the University of Cambridge devised and published a set of Cambridge Rules in 1848 which was widely adopted. Another set of rules, the Sheffield Rules, was used by a number of clubs in the North of England from the 1850s.

Eleven London football clubs and schools' representatives met on 26 October 1863 to agree on common rules. The founding clubs present at the first meeting were:

- Barnes,
- Civil Service,
- Crusaders,
- Forest of Leytonstone (later to become Wanderers F.C.),
- N.N. (No Names) Club (Kilburn),
- the original Crystal Palace,
- the original Blackheath,
- Kensington School,
- Perceval House (Blackheath),
- Surbiton F.C., (Note: Theodore Bell, formerly captain of football at Uppingham School, represented Surbiton at the 'Meeting of the Captains' when the FA was formed; he may also have represented Dingley Dell.)
- Blackheath Proprietary School.

Charterhouse sent their captain, B.F. Hartshorne, but declined the offer to join. Many of these clubs are now defunct or still play rugby. Civil Service FC, who now plays in the Southern Amateur League, is the only one of the original eleven football clubs still in existence, with an unbroken history, and playing association football, although Forest School has been a member since the fifth meeting in December 1863. Both Barnes and Wanderers have been re-established as football clubs in the modern era.

Ebenezer Cobb Morley was the FA's first secretary (1863–66) and its second president (1867–74) and drafted the Laws of the Game generally called the "London Rules" at his home in Barnes, London. He played in the first-ever match in 1863.

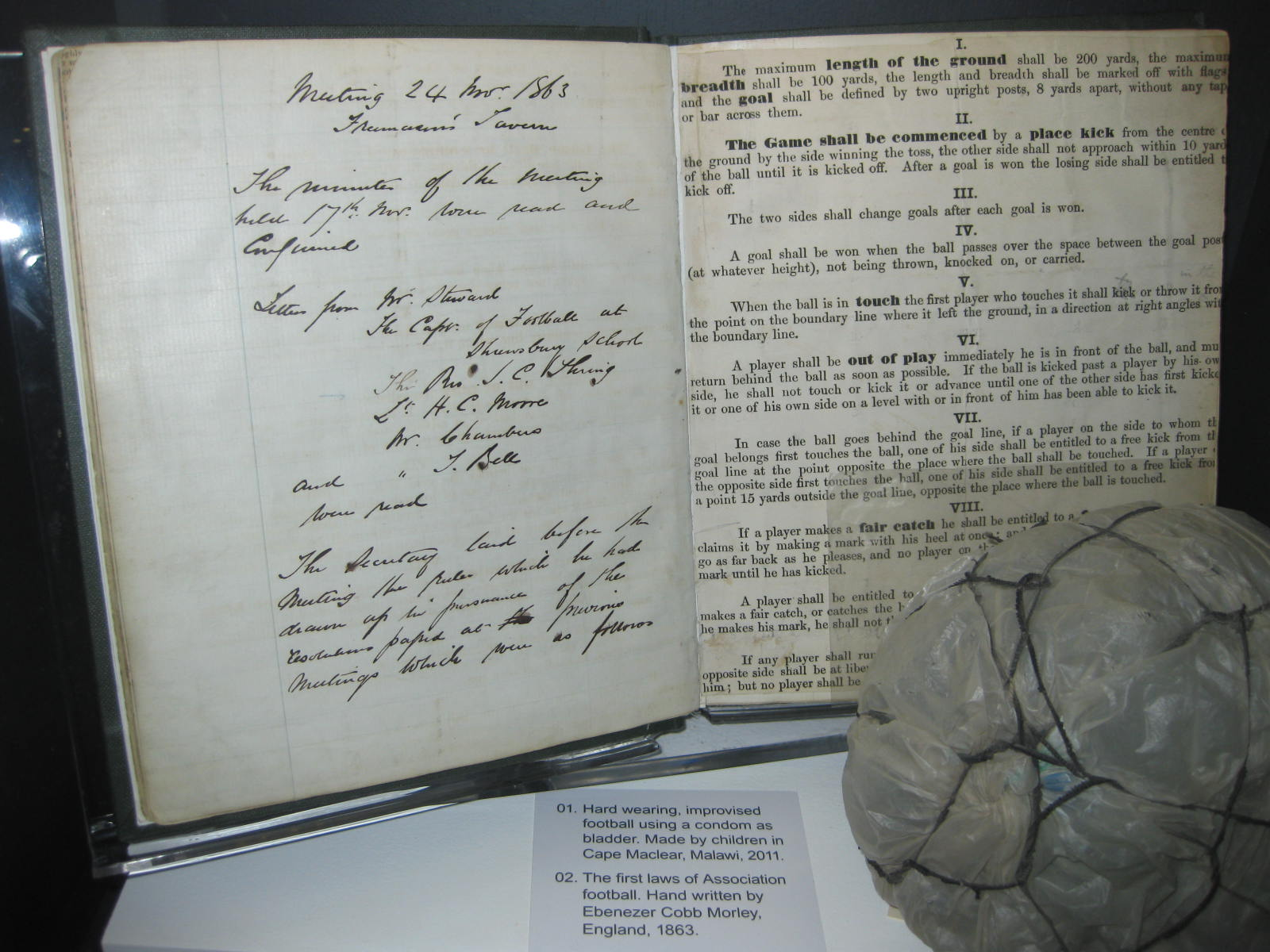
Photo of an early handwritten draft of the 'Laws of the game' for association Football drafted for and behalf of the Football Association by Ebenezer Cobb Morley in 1863 on display at the National Football Museum, Manchester

The first version of the rules for the modern game was drawn up over a series of six meetings held in The Freemasons' Tavern from October to December. Of the clubs at the first meeting, Crusaders, Surbiton and Charterhouse did not attend the subsequent meetings, replaced instead by the Royal Navy School, Wimbledon School and Forest School.

=== Split from rugby ===
At the final meeting on 8 December 1863, F. M. Campbell, the first FA treasurer and the Blackheath representative, withdrew his club from the FA over the removal of two draft rules at the previous meeting, the first which allowed for the running with the ball in hand and the second, obstructing such a run by hacking (kicking an opponent in the shins), tripping and holding. Other English rugby clubs followed this lead and did not join the FA but instead in 1871 formed the Rugby Football Union. The term "soccer" dates back to this split to refer to football played under the "association" rules. After six clubs had withdrawn as they supported the opposing Rugby Rules, the Football Association had just nine members in January 1864: Barnes, Kilburn, Crystal Palace, War Office (Civil Service), Forest Club, Forest School, Sheffield, Uppingham and Royal Engineers (Chatham).

An inaugural game using the new FA rules was initially scheduled for Battersea Park on 2 January 1864, but enthusiastic members of the FA could not wait for the new year: the first game under F. A. rules was played at Mortlake on 19 December 1863 between Morley's Barnes team and their neighbours Richmond (who were not members of the FA), ending in a goalless draw. The Richmond side were obviously unimpressed by the new rules in practice because they subsequently helped form the Rugby Football Union in 1871. The Battersea Park game was the first exhibition game using FA rules, and was played there on Saturday 9 January 1864. The members of the opposing teams for this game were chosen by the President of the FA (A. Pember) and the Secretary (E. C. Morley) and included many well-known footballers of the day. After the first match according to the new FA rules a toast was given "Success to football, irrespective of class or creed".

Another notable match was London v Sheffield, in which a representative team from the FA played Sheffield FC under Association rules in March 1866; Charles Alcock described this game as "first [match] of any importance under the auspices of the Football Association". Alcock (of Harrow School) of the Wanderers was elected to the committee of the FA in 1866, becoming its first full-time secretary and treasurer in 1870. He masterminded the creation of the Football Association Cup—the longest-running association football competition in the world—in 1871. Fifteen participating clubs subscribed to purchase a trophy. The first Cup Final was held at The Oval on 16 March 1872, fought between the Wanderers and the Royal Engineers (RE), watched by 2,000 spectators. In 1874 Francis Marindin became the third president of the Football Association.

As football grew in popularity, it also began to take root in youth communities. In 1875, a Hanover Institute team (founded by Quintin Hogg, supported by fellow Old Etonian Arthur Kinnaird) was involved in an early attempt to incorporate football into the regular activities of a youth club, organising a match with boys from St Andrew's Home in Soho.

=== Single set of laws ===
Coat of arms of the Football Association

After many years of wrangling between the London-based Football Association and the Sheffield Football Association, the FA Cup brought the acceptance that one undisputed set of laws was required. The two associations had played 16 inter-association matches under differing rules; the Sheffield Rules, the London Rules and Mixed Rules. In April 1877, those laws were set with a number of Sheffield Rules being incorporated. In 1890, Kinnaird replaced Major Francis Marindin, becoming the fourth president of the Football Association. Kinnaird had at that time been a FA committeeman since the age of 21, in 1868. Kinnaird remained president for the next 33 years, until his death in 1923.

The FA Cup was initially contested by mostly southern, amateur teams, but more professionally organised northern clubs began to dominate the competition during the early 1880s; "The turning point, north replacing south, working class defeating upper and professionals impinging upon the amateurs' territory, came in 1883." Hitherto, public school sides had played a dribbling game punctuated by violent tackles, but a new passing style developed in Scotland was successfully adopted by some Lancashire teams, along with a more organised approach to training. Blackburn Olympic reached the final in March 1883 and defeated Old Etonians. Near-neighbours Blackburn Rovers started to pay players, and the following season won the first of three consecutive FA Cups. The FA initially tried to outlaw professionalism but, in the face of a threatened breakaway body (the British Football Association), by 1885 was forced to permit payments to players. Three years later, in 1888, the first Football League was established, formed by six professional clubs from northwest England and six from the midlands.

In 1992, the Football Association took control of the newly created Premier League which consisted of 22 clubs who had broken away from the First Division of the Football League. The Premier League reduced to 20 clubs in 1995 and is one of the richest football leagues in the world.

The Football Association has updated their logo several times. They celebrated their 150th year with a special 2013–2014 season logo. The shield design (taken from the coat of arms of the Football Association) is the same, but the three lions, rosettes and border are in gold instead of black and red, with the usual white background. The title strip above reads "The FA" in white on gold, and there is a scroll below reading "150 years" in white on gold, between "1863" and "2013".

=== Women's football ===
By 1921 women's football had become increasingly popular through the charitable games played by women's teams during and after the First World War. In a move that was widely seen as caused by jealousy of the crowds' interest in women's games which frequently exceeded that of the top men's teams, in 1921 the Football Association banned all women's teams from playing on grounds affiliated to the FA because they thought football damaged women's bodies. For several decades, this meant that women's football virtually ceased to exist.

The decision to exclude women was only reversed from 1969 when, after the increased interest in football caused by England's 1966 World Cup triumph, the Women's Football Association was founded, although it would take a further two years – and an order from UEFA – to force the (men's) Football Association to remove its restrictions on the playing rights of women's teams. It was not until 1983 that the WFA was able to affiliate to the FA as a "County Association" and only in 1993 did the FA found the "Women's Football Committee" to run women's football in England. The "Women's Football Conference", as it is now known, has representation on the FA Council equivalent to a County Football Association.

=== FA 2017 reform ===
In December 2016, five former FA executives – David Bernstein, David Davies, Greg Dyke, Alex Horne and David Triesman – called on Parliament's Culture, Media and Sport Committee to propose legislation to reform the FA, saying it was outdated, held back by "elderly white men", and unable to counter the power of the Premier League or "to reform and modernise in a fast-changing world".

In April 2017, it was announced that some reforms, including reducing the size of the FA's board and increasing the number of women, would be submitted for approval to the FA's annual general meeting on 18 May. However, the proposed changes were criticised by some for not going far enough, particularly to improve minority representation. The proposals were approved at the AGM and include:

- Establishing three positions on the FA board for female members by 2018
- Reducing the size of the board to 10 members
- Adding 11 new members to the FA Council to "better reflects the inclusive and diverse nature of English football"
- Limiting board membership to three terms of three years
- Introducing term limits for FA Council members

However, pressure for FA reform continued fuelled by allegations of racism and bullying in relation to the Mark Sampson and Eniola Aluko cases, and the historical sexual abuse scandal. In October 2017, FA chairman Greg Clarke announced a "fundamental" review of the FA after admitting it had "lost the trust of the public" following the Sampson controversy. In the same month, Clarke was criticised by sexual abuse victim Andy Woodward and the Professional Footballers' Association's chief executive Gordon Taylor for remarks Clarke made to a Digital, Culture, Media and Sport Committee (DCMS) hearing.

In November 2020, Clarke resigned as FA chairman over his use of the term "coloured" when referring to black players in comments to the DCMS committee via video link. The FA subsequently announced they would seek a new chairman, with hopes there would be an announcement as to the successor by March 2021.

=== UK football sexual abuse scandal (2016–2021) ===
In mid-November 2016, allegations of widespread historical sexual abuse at football clubs dating back to the 1970s began to emerge. On 21 November, the Football Association said it would set up a helpline; this was established with the NSPCC and opened on 24 November, receiving 860 calls ("more than three times as many referrals as in the first three days of the Jimmy Savile scandal") by 1 December with 350 individuals alleging abuse. The FA and NSPCC also collaborated to produce a film about how to keep children safe in the sport, featuring the captains of England's men's, women's and cerebral palsy football teams (Wayne Rooney, Steph Houghton and Jack Rutter).

On 27 November, the FA announced it was to set up an internal review into what Crewe and Manchester City knew about convicted child sex offender Barry Bennell and allegations of child sexual abuse in football, and investigate what information it was aware of at the time of the alleged offences. On 6 December 2016, the FA announced that, due to "the increased scope of the review since it was announced" the review would be conducted by Clive Sheldon QC.

In July 2018, it was reported that the FA's independent inquiry had found no evidence of an institutional cover-up or of a paedophile ring operating within football. Sheldon's report, likely to be highly critical of several clubs, was initially expected to be delivered to the FA in September 2018, but its publication was delayed, potentially by up to a year at the time, pending the retrial of Bob Higgins and possible further charges against Barry Bennell.

The 700-page report was eventually published on 17 March 2021. It identified failures to act adequately on complaints or rumours of sexual abuse at eight professional clubs: Aston Villa, Chelsea, Crewe Alexandra, Manchester City, Newcastle United, Peterborough, Southampton and Stoke City. The report also made 13 recommendations for further improvements, however, the measures were criticised for being too late and lacking ambition. The FA issued a "heartfelt apology" to survivors and said it would be implementing all of Sheldon's recommendations.

== Honours ==
=== Men ===
- FIFA World Cup

- Winners (1): 1966
- Third place (1): 2026
- Fourth place (2): 1990, 2018

- UEFA European Championship

- Runners-up (2): 2020, 2024
- Third place (1): 1968

- UEFA Nations League

- Third place (1): 2019

- Olympic Games

- Gold medal (3): 1900, 1908, 1912

=== Women ===
- FIFA Women's World Cup

- Runners-up (1): 2023
- Third place (1): 2015
- Fourth place (1): 2019

- UEFA European Women's Championship

- Winners (2): 2022, 2025
- Runners-up (2): 1984, 2009
- Fourth place (1): 1987

- Women's Finalissima

- Winners (1): 2023

=== National youth teams ===
==== Men ====
- FIFA U-20 World Cup

- Winners (1): 2017
- Third place (1): 1993
- Fourth place (1): 1981

- FIFA U-17 World Cup

- Winners (1): 2017

- UEFA European U-21 Championship

- Winners (4): 1982, 1984, 2023, 2025
- Runners-up (1): 2009

- UEFA European U-19/18 Championship (U-19 since 2002)

- Winners (11): 1948, 1963, 1964, 1971, 1972, 1973, 1975, 1980, 1993, 2017, 2022
- Runners-up (5): 1958, 1965, 1967, 2005, 2009
- Third place (3): 1979, 1983, 1996
- Fourth place (3): 1952, 1990, 1992

- UEFA European U-17/16 Championship (U-17 since 2002)

- Winners (2): 2010, 2014
- Runners-up (2): 2007, 2017
- Third place (2): 1984, 2002
- Fourth place (3): 2001, 2003, 2004

==== Women ====
- FIFA U-20 Women's World Cup

- Third place (1): 2018

- FIFA U-17 Women's World Cup

- Fourth place (2): 2008, 2024

- UEFA Women's U-19 Championship

- Winners (1): 2009
- Runners-up (3): 2007, 2010, 2013

- UEFA Women's U-17 Championship

- Runners-up (1): 2024
- Third place (1): 2016
- Fourth place (3): 2008, 2014, 2018

== Crown Dependencies and Overseas Territories ==
The football associations within the Crown Dependencies of Jersey (Jersey Football Association), Guernsey (Guernsey Football Association) and the Isle of Man (Isle of Man Football Association) are affiliated to the FA despite having a separate identity from that of the United Kingdom and by extension England. They are considered county football associations by the FA. Matt Le Tissier and Graeme Le Saux have represented the FA's full national representative team and were born in Guernsey and Jersey respectively.

The Guernsey Football Association, Isle of Man Football Association and Jersey Football Association have been affiliated with the FA since 1903, 1908 and 1905 respectively.

A loophole was closed in May 2008 by FIFA which allowed players born in the Channel Islands to choose which home nation within the United Kingdom they will represent at international level. During the 1990s, Trevor Wood (Jersey) and Chris Tardif (Guernsey) represented Northern Ireland.

The British overseas territory of Gibraltar's Gibraltar Football Association was affiliated to the FA from 1911 until it opted to become a fully recognised member of UEFA, a feat achieved after a 14-year legal battle. Joseph Nunez, the Gibraltar FA President claimed they were "unilaterally thrown out" of the FA following an intervention from Geoff Thompson.

On the other hand, the Hong Kong Football Association (HKFA), established in 1914, is one of the oldest football associations in Asia. They joined FIFA in 1954, and were also one of twelve founding members of the Asian Football Confederation (AFC). HK played an important role in the early development of Asian football and hosted the first Asian Cup competition in 1956. The dependent territory was relinquished by the UK in 1997 and handed over to the People's Republic of China.

Some of the other British overseas territories have local football associations or leagues (including the Anguilla Football Association, the Ascension Island Football League, the Bermuda Football Association, the British Virgin Islands Football Association, the Cayman Islands Football Association, the Falkland Islands Football League, the Montserrat Football Association, the Saint Helena Football League and the Turks and Caicos Islands Football Association), but these are not considered subsidiary to the Football Association.

Although the British overseas territories are too small to support professional teams, they have produced players such as Clyde Best who have gone on to play professionally in the Football Association, and referees such as Carlyle Crockwell, who have refereed FIFA matches.

== Relationship with FIFA ==
The Football Association first joined FIFA in 1905. The British Associations (England, Ireland, Scotland and Wales) opted to leave FIFA after World War I when FIFA chose not to exclude those who were part of the Central Powers from the organisation. The British Associations' stance had changed by 1922 and in 1924 they had rejoined FIFA. (Note: Ireland had since been partitioned. Northern Ireland remained part of the United Kingdom, the Irish Free State was independent of Britain. The latter is now the Republic of Ireland.)

The British Olympic Association had fought against "broken time" – monetary compensation for athletes' earnings when competing in the Olympic games. At the 1925 Olympic Congress in Prague, the British had made an amendment that concluded governing federations should define amateur status for their sports but only in accordance with the definition of amateurism accepted by the Olympic Congress. In 1928, Switzerland proposed to FIFA that in certain circumstances, "broken time" payments should be allowed and FIFA accepted. The FA resigned from FIFA in protest against the proposal. As a result of the FA's resignation, England did not participate in the 1930, 1934 or 1938 FIFA World Cup.

At the 1930 Olympic Congress in Berlin, Belgian delegates proposed that for each sport the definition of amateur status be left to its international federation. The BOA argued for a common definition of amateurism and argued that "broken time" payments were against the Olympic ideal. The FA rejoined FIFA in 1946 and participated in their first World Cup in 1950. One of the first actions of the Football Association was to request the expulsion of the German and Japanese national football associations for their countries' role in World War II. Germany and Japan were prevented from qualifying for the 1950 FIFA World Cup as a consequence. They were re-acquainted with FIFA in 1950 following a second request from Switzerland who had had a previous request rejected in 1948.

== Competitions ==
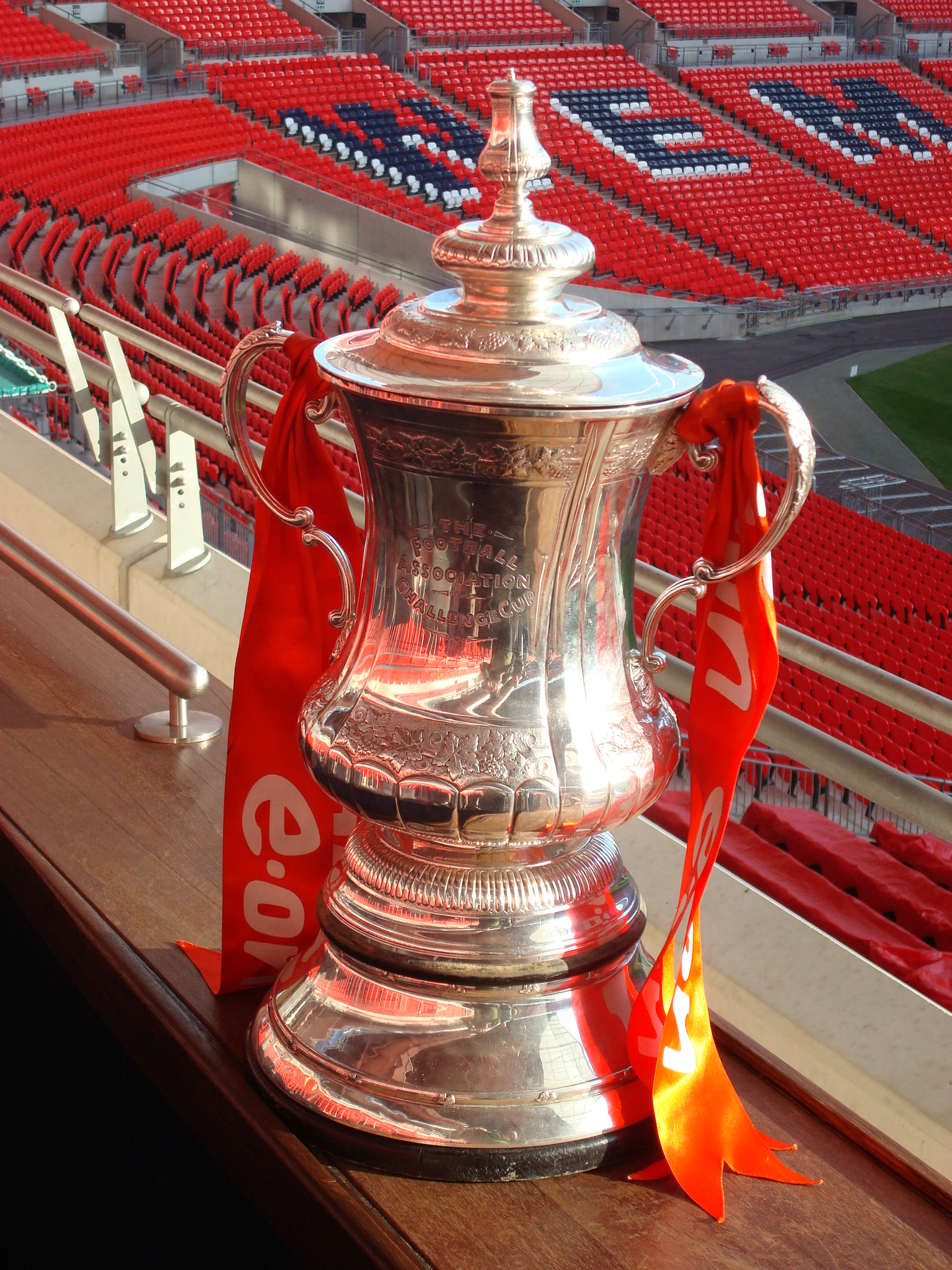
The FA Cup trophy used from 1992 to 2013

The FA runs several competitions:

=== Current ===
- FA Cup
- FA Trophy
- FA Vase
- Women's FA Cup
- FA Women's National League Cup
- FA Women's National League Plate
- FA Youth Cup
- FA Sunday Cup
- FA County Youth Cup
- FA Community Shield
- Women's FA Community Shield
- FA Inter-League Cup
- FA Futsal Cup
- FA People's Cup

=== Defunct ===
- FA Umbro Fives

== Finance and governance ==
=== Finances ===
The FA's main commercial asset is its ownership of the rights to England internationals and the FA Cup. Broadcasting income remains the FA's largest revenue stream with both domestic and international broadcasting rights for England fixtures and the FA Cup tied up until at least 2021.

For the four seasons from 2008 to 2012, the FA secured £425 million from ITV and Setanta for England and FA Cup games domestic television rights, a 42% increase over the previous contract, and £145 million for overseas television rights, up 272% on the £39 million received for the previous four-year period. However, during 2008–09 Setanta UK went into administration, which weakened the FA's cashflow position.

Turnover for the year ending 31 July 2016 was £370 million on which it made a profit after tax of £7 million. It has also made an investment of £125 million back into every level of Football in 2016. In July 2015 the FA announced plans to carry out a significant organisational restructure, in order to deliver considerable cost savings to invest in elite England teams, facilities and grassroots coaching.

The FA's income does not include the turnover of English football clubs, which are independent businesses. As well as running its own operations the FA chooses five charities each year to which it gives financial support.

In three years up to 2014, the FA received £350,000 in fines from players over comments made on Twitter. The highest fine imposed was a £90,000 fine to Ashley Cole in 2012 after calling the FA "a bunch of twats." The FA became stricter on comments made by players on Twitter, disciplining 121 players in three years.

=== Principals ===
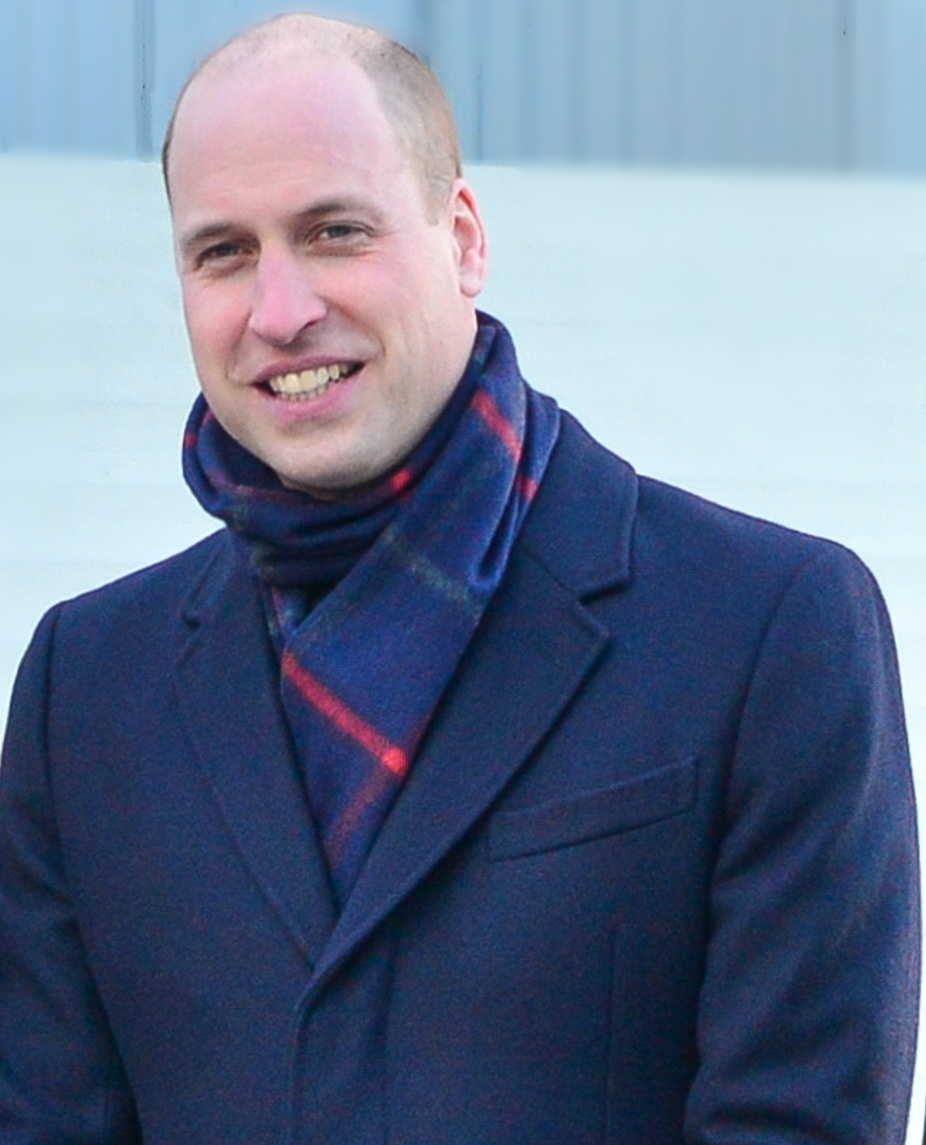
The Prince of Wales is the current Patron of the FA.

The FA has a figurehead President, who since 1939 has always been a member of the British royal family. The Chairman of the FA has overall responsibility for policy. Traditionally this person rose through the ranks of the FA's committee structure (e.g. by holding posts such as the chairmanship of a county football association). In 2008 politician David Triesman was appointed as the FA's first "independent chairman", the first from outside the football hierarchy. The day-to-day head of the FA was known as the Secretary until 1989, when the job title was changed to Chief Executive.

Historic presidents

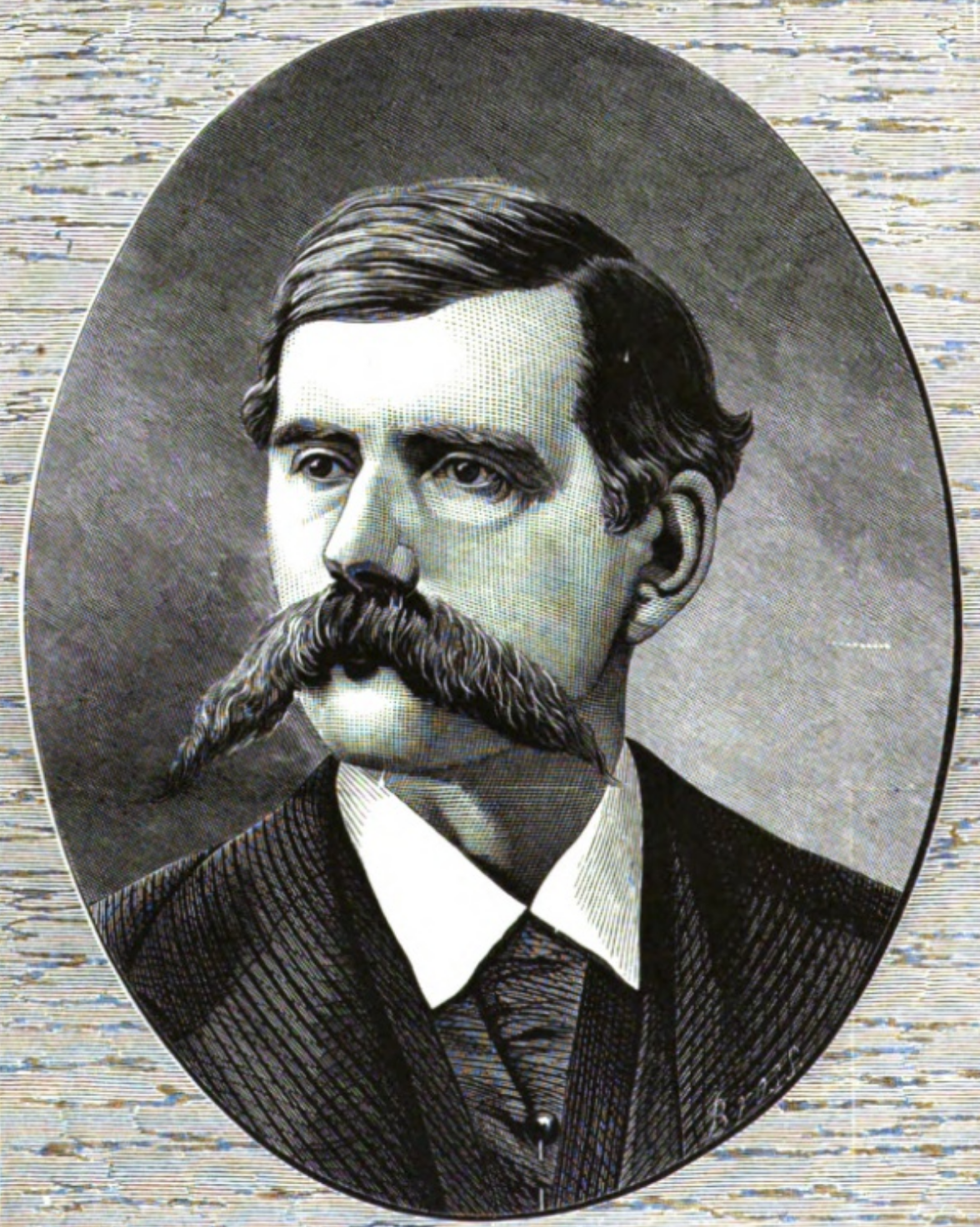
Arthur Pember

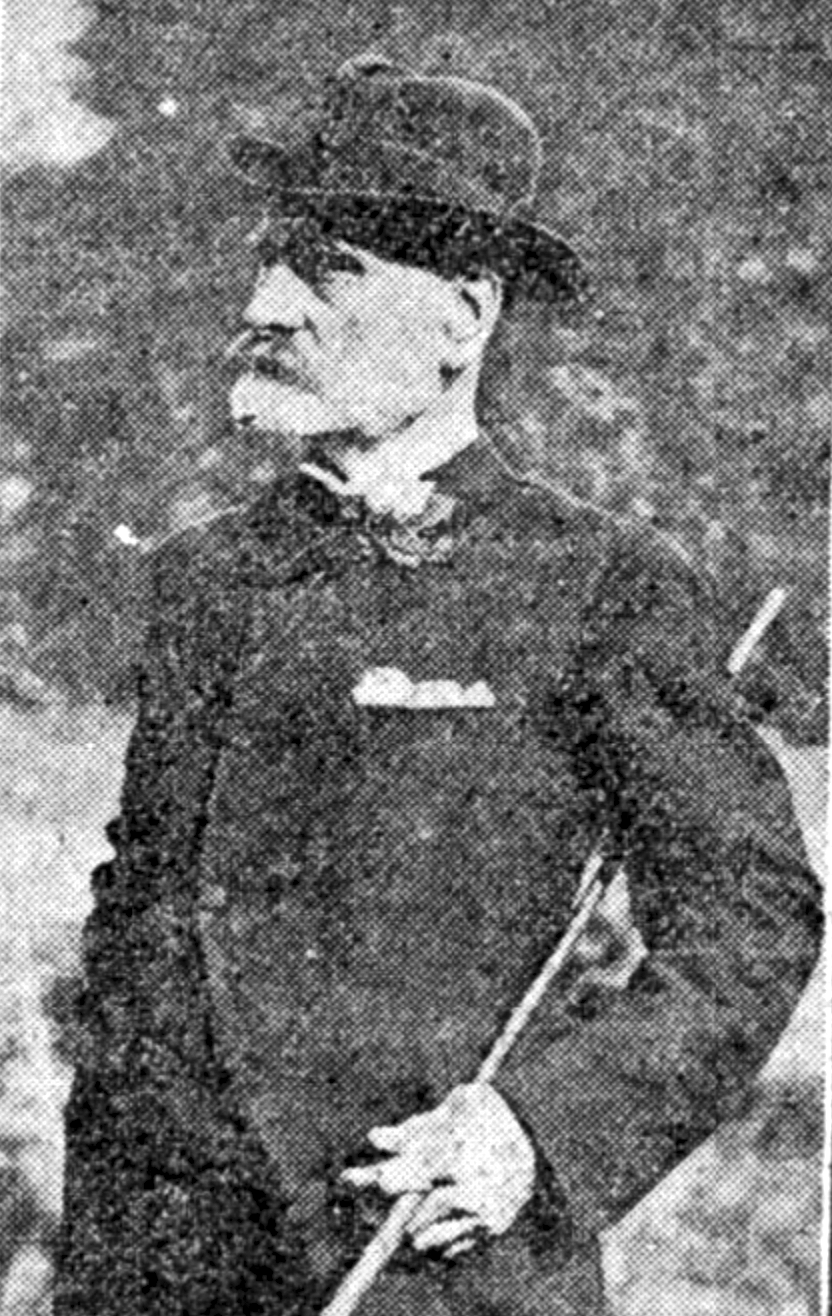
Ebenezer Morley

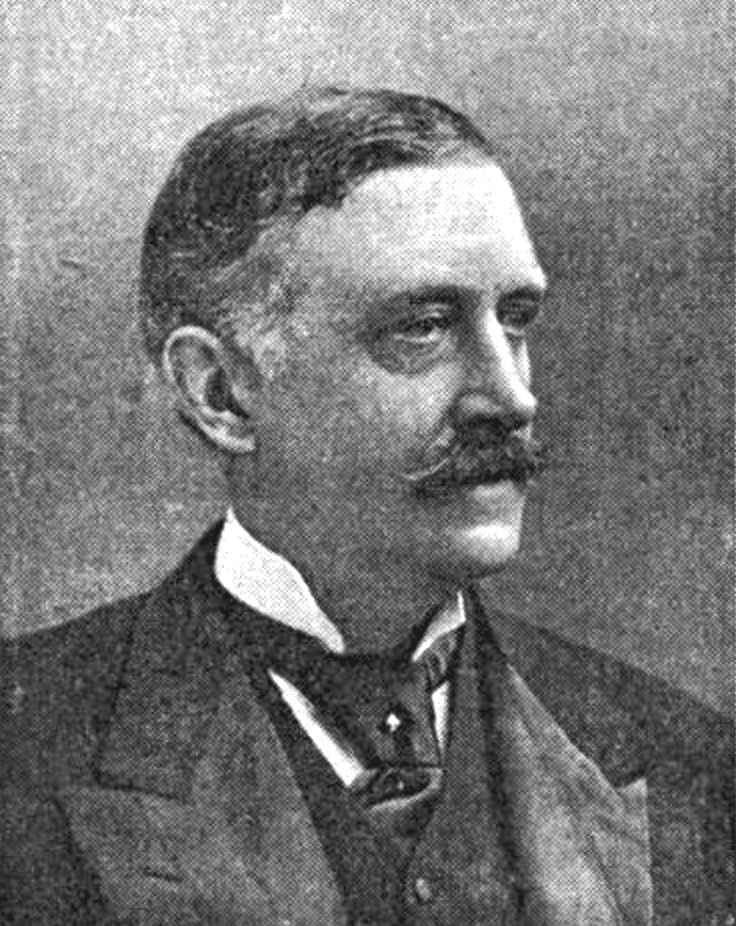
Francis Marindin

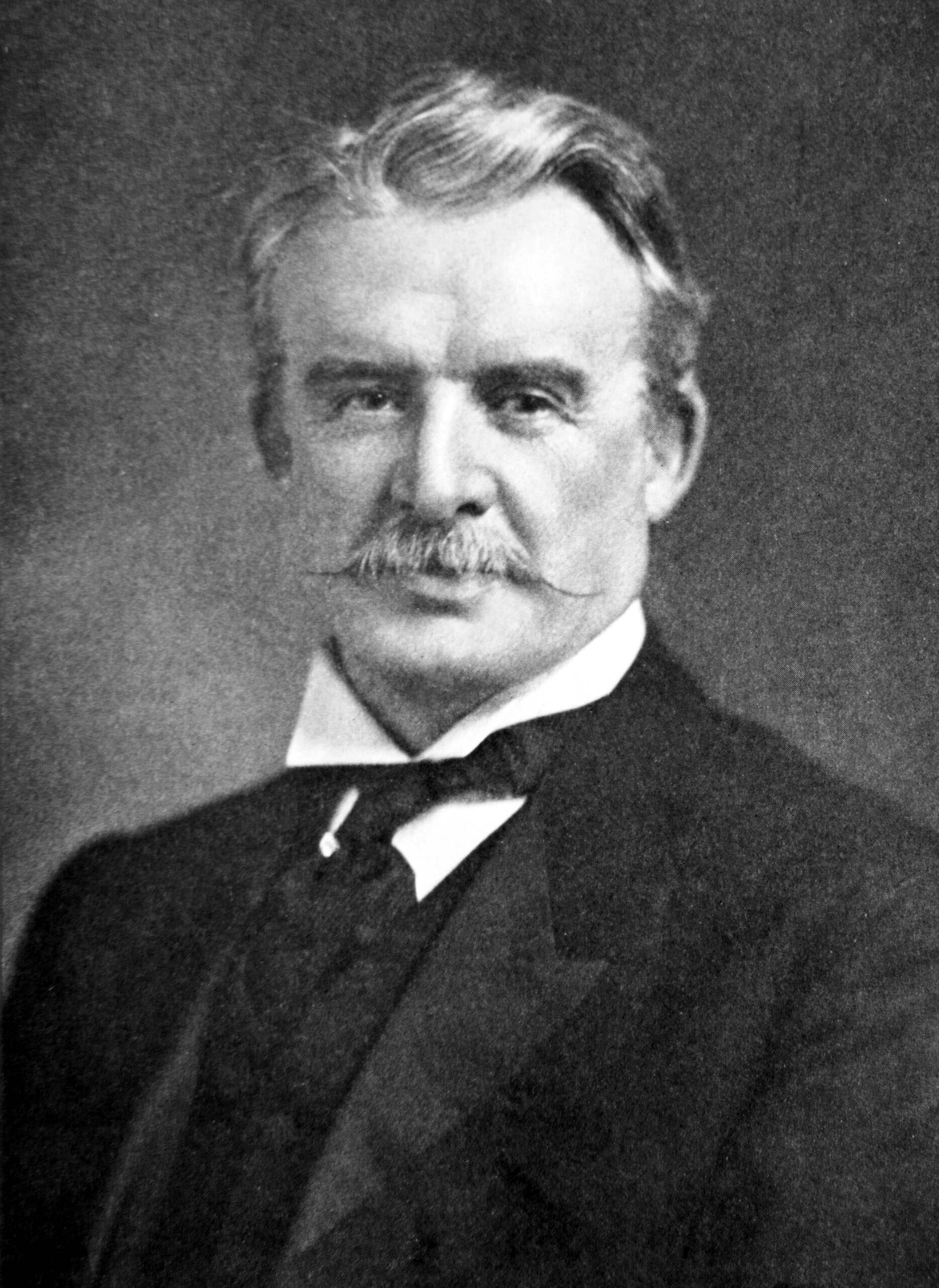
Charles Clegg

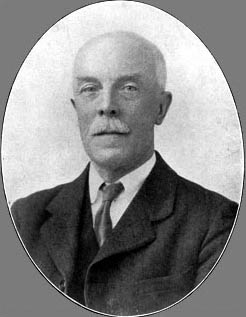
William Pickford

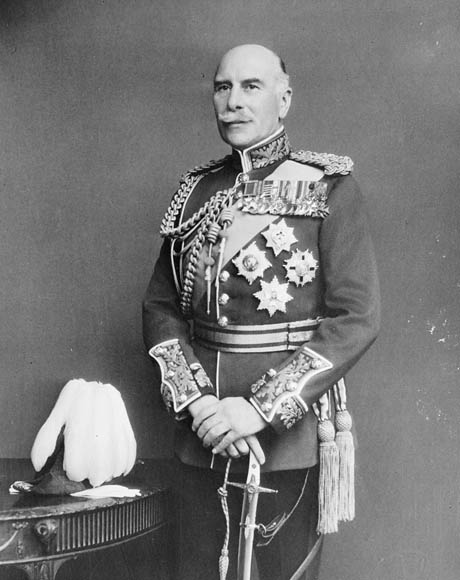
The Earl of Athlone

Office-holders
Office	Name	Tenure
President	Arthur Pember	1863–1867
President	E. C. Morley	1867–1874
President	Francis Marindin	1874–1890
President	Lord Kinnaird	1890–1923
President	Sir Charles Clegg (Note: Known as Charles Clegg until he was knighted in 1927)	1923–1937
President	William Pickford	1937–1939
President	The Earl of Athlone	1939–1955
President	The Duke of Edinburgh	1955–1957
President	The Duke of Gloucester	1957–1963
President	The Earl of Harewood	1963–1971
President	The Duke of Kent	1971–2000
President	The Duke of York	2000–2006
President	The Prince of Wales (Note: Known as Prince William of Wales until 2011 and as the Duke of Cambridge between 2011 and 2022. He became the FA's Patron in 2024.)	2006–2024
Vice President	Charles Crump	1886–1923
Chairman/person	Charles Clegg	1890–1937
Chairman/person	A. G. Hines	1938
Chairman/person	Mark Frowde	1939–1941
Chairman/person	Sir Amos Brook Hirst (Note: Known as Amos Brook Hirst until he was knighted in 1954)	1941–1955
Chairman/person	Arthur Drewry	1955–1961
Chairman/person	Graham Doggart	1961–1963
Chairman/person	Joe Mears	1963–1966
Chairman/person	Sir Andrew Stephen (Note: Known as Andrew Stephen until he was knighted in 1972)	1967–1976
Chairman/person	Sir Harold Thompson	1976–1981
Chairman/person	Sir Bert Millichip	1981–1996
Chairman/person	Keith Wiseman	1996–1999
Chairman/person	Geoff Thompson	1999–2008
Chairman/person	The Lord Triesman	2008–2010
Chairman/person	David Bernstein	2011–2013
Chairman/person	Greg Dyke	2013–2016
Chairman/person	David Gill	2016 (interim)
Chairman/person	Greg Clarke	2016–2020
Chairman/person	Peter McCormick	2020–2022 (interim)
Chairman/person	Debbie Hewitt	2022–present
Secretary	E. C. Morley	1863–1866
Secretary	R. W. Willis	1866–1867
Secretary	R. G. Graham	1867–1870
Secretary	C. W. Alcock	1870–1895
Secretary	Sir Frederick Wall (Note: Known as Frederick Wall until he was knighted in 1930)	1895–1934
Secretary	Sir Stanley Rous (Note: Known as Stanley Rous until he was knighted in 1949)	1934–1962
Secretary	Denis Follows	1962–1973
Secretary	Ted Croker	1973–1989
Chief executive	Graham Kelly	1989–1998
Executive Director	David Davies	1998–2000
Chief executive	Adam Crozier	2000–2002
Chief executive	David Davies	2002–2003 (acting)
Chief executive	Mark Palios	2003–2004
Chief executive	David Davies	2004–2005 (acting)
Chief executive	Brian Barwick	2005–2008
Chief executive	Ian Watmore	2009–2010
Chief executive	Alex Horne	2010 (acting)
Chief executive	Martin Glenn	2015–2019
Chief executive	Mark Bullingham	2019–present
General Secretary	Alex Horne	2010–present

=== Board of directors ===
Taken from The FA's website on 25 May 2026

- Chairwoman: Debbie Hewitt
- Chief executive: Mark Bullingham

National game representatives:

- Sarah Walters
- Alex Baker

Professional game representatives:

- Rick Parry
- Dharmash Mistry

Independent non-executive directors:

- Kate Tinsley
- Stephen Morana
- Mark Esiri
- Jobi McAnuff

Board observers:

- Paul Elliott
- David Gill
