= EPH (company) =

Company in the Czech Republic

Energetický a průmyslový holding, a.s.
- Type: Joint-stock company
- Industry: Energy
- Founded: 2009
- Headquarters: Prague, Czech Republic
- Area served: Europe
- Key people: Daniel Křetínský (chairman); Jan Špringl (CEO)
- Products: Electricity and heat
- Services: Energy generation, transmission, distribution and supply
- Revenue: €27.0 billion (2025)
- Operating income: €2.36 billion (2025)
- Net income: €3.15 billion (2025)
- Total assets: €36.27 billion (2025)
- Total equity: €12.09 billion (2025)
- Owner: EP Group (56%); J&T Energy Holding (44%)
- Number of employees: 12,379 (2025 average)
- Subsidiaries: EP Infrastructure; Slovenské elektrárne
- Website: www.epholding.cz

Energetický a průmyslový holding, a.s. (EPH) is a Czech energy group headquartered in Prague, Czech Republic. Founded in 2009, the company operates energy infrastructure and generation assets across Europe, including electricity generation, combined heat and power, natural gas transmission and storage, electricity and gas distribution, and energy supply. Through its subsidiaries, EPH operates in countries including the Czech Republic, Slovakia, Germany, Italy, the United Kingdom and France.

EPH is one of the largest Czech-owned companies and employs approximately 25,000 people through more than 50 companies. The company is controlled by Czech entrepreneur Daniel Křetínský through EP Group. Since its establishment, EPH has expanded through acquisitions of energy assets in Central and Western Europe.

In the 2020s, it has diversified its portfolio through investments in nuclear energy, renewable energy, flexible power generation and energy storage, including the acquisition of control of Slovenské elektrárne in 2025 and the creation of TTEP, a flexible power generation and storage joint venture with TotalEnergies.

== Ownership ==
EPH was founded in 2009 as an indirect subsidiary of J&T Finance Group. Its initial shareholders were PPF Group (40%), J&T (40%) and Daniel Křetínský. In 2012, PPF increased its stake to 44.4% through the conversion of part of its debt into shares, reducing the stakes of J&T and Křetínský.

In 2014, PPF sold its stake in EPH to the remaining shareholders for approximately €1.1 billion, leaving control with Daniel Křetínský and Patrik Tkáč together with J&T-related entities. In 2016, EPH reorganised its ownership structure, including the sale of a minority stake in its infrastructure subsidiary EP Infrastructure to Macquarie Infrastructure and Real Assets. Following the transaction, Daniel Křetínský became the controlling shareholder of EPH, while a minority stake was held by EPH managers.

EPH is currently controlled by Daniel Křetínský through EP Group (formerly EP Corporate Group), which serves as an umbrella structure for his strategic investments.

== Activities by country ==
=== Germany ===
EPH expanded into Germany through MIBRAG, becoming its sole owner in 2012. MIBRAG operated the Profen and Vereinigtes Schleenhain lignite mines and several smaller cogeneration plants. Later that year, EPH also acquired a 41.9% stake in the Schkopau Power Station through Saale Energie.

In 2016, EPH and PPF Investments acquired Vattenfall's German lignite mining and generation business. The transaction included the Jänschwalde, Boxberg and Schwarze Pumpe power stations, a 50% stake in the Lippendorf power station, and four active lignite mines in Lusatia. The business subsequently became part of LEAG. EPH subsequently acquired the coal-fired Mehrum Power Station in 2017; the plant was permanently closed in March 2024.

As part of a reorganisation of EP Group's German energy assets, EPH transferred its 50% interest in LEAG to sister company EP Energy Transition in 2023. In 2025, EPH also completed the transfer of MIBRAG and Saale Energie to EP Energy Transition, its remaining German lignite mining operations. EPH continues to operate other businesses in Germany, including EP Power Minerals, which is headquartered in Dinslaken, and logistics activities.

=== Czech Republic ===
EPH is headquartered in Prague, and its Czech operations have traditionally focused on electricity and heat generation, district heating, energy infrastructure and logistics. Through EP Infrastructure, the group remains active in district heating in Plzeň and northern Bohemia and operates natural gas storage through SPP Storage at Dolní Bojanovice.

The group previously owned several major Czech heating and generation businesses, including Elektrárny Opatovice, United Energy and Pražská teplárenská. Pražská teplárenská, the operator of Prague's principal district-heating system, was sold to Veolia in 2020.

In 2025, Elektrárny Opatovice and United Energy were transferred from EP Infrastructure to EP Heat & Power, another company within EP Group, while EP Infrastructure retained the associated heat-distribution businesses. EPH is also active in freight and logistics through companies including EP Cargo.

=== Slovakia ===
EPH became a major investor in the Slovak energy sector in 2013, acquiring interests in Slovenský plynárenský priemysel (SPP) and Stredoslovenská energetika (SSE). Through EP Infrastructure, it holds a 49% stake and management control in SPP Infrastructure, whose businesses include gas transmission operator Eustream, gas distributor SPP-distribúcia and gas-storage company NAFTA.

The group later expanded into electricity generation through Slovenské elektrárne, Slovakia's largest electricity producer. EPH began acquiring its interest from Enel in 2015 and became the sole owner of Slovak Power Holding, which holds 66% of Slovenské elektrárne, in May 2025. Slovenské elektrárne operates nuclear, hydroelectric and solar power plants, including the Mochovce Nuclear Power Plant, where fuel loading for Unit 4 began in 2026.

=== Italy ===
EPH entered the Italian electricity market in 2015 by acquiring most of E.ON's power-generation business in the country. The deal included the Fiume Santo power station in Sardinia and six gas-fired power plants at Livorno Ferraris, Tavazzano, Ostiglia, Ferrara, Trapani and Scandale, with a combined capacity of about 4.5 GW. The plants were operated through EP Produzione, which later added new combined-cycle capacity at Tavazzano and Ostiglia.

In 2026, most of EPH's Italian gas-fired generation business became part of TTEP, a 50:50 joint venture with TotalEnergies. The Italian assets represented about 5.5 GW of gas-fired capacity, alongside biomass generation and battery-storage projects. Fiume Santo remained wholly owned by EPH outside the joint venture.

=== France ===
EPH entered the French energy market in 2019 by acquiring Uniper's French business renamed GazelEnergie. The acquisition included coal, biomass, renewable-energy and gas-fired generation assets. Two gas-fired units at Saint-Avold were then sold to Total.

GazelEnergie remains active in electricity generation and supply in France, including at the Émile-Huchet site and the Provence biomass plant, and has expanded into renewable energy and battery storage. In 2026, it acquired renewable-energy supplier Ilek, expanding into the residential market. Battery-storage assets also became part of TTEP, EPH's joint venture with TotalEnergies, in 2026.

Construction of a 15.7 MWp solar farm at the former Lucy coal-fired power station in Montceau-les-Mines began in March 2026 and commissioning is expected in early 2027.

=== Ireland ===
In 2019, EP UK Investments acquired an 80% stake in Tynagh Energy, owner of the 400 MW gas-fired Tynagh Power Plant in County Galway. The investment later became part of TTEP, power generation joint venture.

=== United Kingdom ===
EPH built up a substantial UK power-generation business during the 2010s. It acquired the coal-fired Eggborough power station in 2015 and Lynemouth power station from RWE in 2016. Eggborough closed in 2018, while Lynemouth was converted to biomass generation. The group expanded into gas-fired generation in 2017 with the acquisition of the South Humber Bank and Langage power stations from Centrica.

In 2019, EPH acquired the Ballylumford and Kilroot power stations in Northern Ireland from AES Corporation, followed by the Humbly Grove gas-storage facility in Hampshire in 2020. In 2026, most of EPH's UK flexible-generation assets became part of TTEP joint venture.

=== Netherlands ===
EPH expanded into the Netherlands in 2023 through its subsidiary EP Netherlands. In January, it acquired EDF's 50% stake in the Sloe gas-fired power plant near Vlissingen and obtained the remaining half through its acquisition of Dutch energy company PZEM, giving it full ownership of the plant. In the same time, it acquired the Rijnmond power plant near Rotterdam. Later that year, EP Netherlands added the MaasStroom plant and a 50% stake in Enecogen, bringing its Dutch generation portfolio to about 2.6 GW.

In 2026, the Dutch generation business became part of TTEP.

=== Hungary ===
In 2015, EPH acquired a majority stake in Budapesti Erőmű, gaining control of three gas-fired cogeneration plants serving the Budapest district-heating network. The business was sold to Veolia in 2020. EPH also briefly held an interest in the Mátra Power Plant, which was sold to Opus Global in 2018.

In 2026, the group remains active in Hungary through HHE Group Ventures, a joint venture involved in hydrocarbon exploration and production. Its logistics business also expanded into Hungary in 2025 with the launch of licensed rail-freight operator SI CARGO Hungária.

=== Poland ===
EPH formerly owned PG Silesia, a hard-coal mining company in southern Poland. Its interest was sold to Polish mining company Bumech in 2021.

The group remains active in Poland through logistics companies including EP CARGO POLSKA and EP Cargo Trucking PL. In 2025, EPH also sold a controlling stake in EP Resources PL while retaining a 49% interest.

=== Ukraine ===
In April 2020, EPH subsidiary EP Ukraine has been granted exploration and production license for the Hrunivska and Okhtyrska areas in northeastern Ukraine. Production-sharing agreements covering the two areas were signed with the Ukrainian government in 2021 for a period of 50 years.

Development of the projects has been disrupted by the Russian invasion of Ukraine. In 2024, the Ukrainian government amended the agreements to extend force-majeure provisions and deadlines for fulfilling investment obligations during martial law.

== See also ==
- Energy in the Czech Republic
