= List of tallest structures in France =

An incomplete list of the tallest structures in France. The list contains all types of structures, may be incomplete and should be expanded.

Name	Pinnacle height	Year	Structure type	Town	Coordinates	Remarks	Ref.
Longwave transmitter Allouis	350 m	1974	Guyed Mast	Allouis	47°10′10.45″N 2°12′16.75″E ; 47°10′25.34″N 2°12′16.81″E	2 masts	
HWU transmitter, central mast	350 m	1970	Guyed Mast	Rosnay	46°42′47.49″N 1°14′42.22″E		
Viaduc de Millau	343 m	2004	Bridge Pillar	Milliau	44°4′58.94″N 3°1′19.25″E		
Transmitter Le Mans-Mayet	342 m	1993	Guyed Mast	Mayet	47°45′52.78″N 0°19′24.37″E		
TV Mast Niort-Maisonnay	330 m	1978	Guyed Mast	Niort	46°11′33.92″N 0°3′10.34″W		
La Regine transmitter	330 m	1973	Guyed Mast	Saissac	43°23′12.41″N 2°05′50.51″E	Military VLF transmitter	
Transmitter Roumoules	330 m	1974	Guyed Mast	Roumoules	43°47′36.29″N 6°9′30.61″E	spare transmission mast for longwave, insulated against ground	
Eiffel Tower	330 m	1889	Tower	Paris	48°51′29.77″N 2°17′40.09″E		
Col de la Madone transmitter, longwave masts	320 m	1965	Guyed mast	Peille		3 masts, insulated against ground, demolished after Roumoules transmitter went in service	
Transmitter Bouvigny-Boyeffles	307 m	?	Guyed Mast	Bouvigny-Boyeffles	50°25′13.99″N 2°39′4″E		
Kerlouan transmitter	300 m	?	Guyed Mast	Kerlouan	48°38′15.85″N 4°21′2.77″W	Military VLF transmitter	
Transmitter Roumoules	300 m	1974	Guyed Mast	Roumoules	43°47′41.45″N 6°8′48.41″E ; 43°47′34.56″N 6°8′59.09″E; 43°47′27.7″N 6°9′9.85″E	3 masts used for longwave broadcasting, insulated against ground	
Provence Power Station	297 m	1984	Chimney	Gardanne	43°28′10.29″N 5°29′15.58″E		
Transmitter Fleury	289 m	?	Guyed Mast	Fleury	49°16′38.29″N 3°09′26.45″E		
Nordheim transmitter	273 m	?	Guyed Mast	Nordheim	48°38′25.67″N 7°29′11.54″E		
Transmitter Saint Pern	270 m	?	Guyed Mast	Saint Pern	48°17′17.54″N 1°57′33.56″W		
HWU transmitter, inner ring masts	270 m	1970	Guyed Mast	Rosnay	46°42′28.69″N 1°14′54.73″E ; 46°42′45.17″N 1°15′12.03″E ; 46°43′37.6″N 1°14′59.91″E ; 46°43′5.77″N 1°14′30.32″E ; 46°42′49.14″N 1°14′13.02″E ; 46°42′30.44″N 1°14′25.45″E		
Aramon Power Plant Chimney	252 m	1977	Chimney	Aramon	43°52′57.05″N 4°39′28.99″E		
Transmitter Bouliac	252 m	1957	Guyed Mast	Bouliac	44°49′11.44″N 0°30′19.76″W		
Towers of Lafayette transmitter	250 m	1920	Lattice tower	Marcheprime	44°42′23″N 0°48′28″W	8 towers, demolished between 1944 and 1953	
Masts of Saint Assise transmitter	250 m	1921	Guyed mast	Saint Assise	48°32′48.96″N 2°34′7.73″E ;48°32′48.1″N 2°34′27.19″E ; 48°32′47.09″N 2°34′46.76″E ; 48°32′46.27″N 2°35′6.13″E ; 48°32′36.13″N 2°34′6.37″E ; 48°32′35.19″N 2°34′25.79″E ; 48°32′34.28″N 2°34′45.24″E ; 48°32′33.37″N 2°35′4.72″E	8 masts	
Col de la Madone Mediumwave Transmitter, 702 kHz Antenna, Mast West	250 m	1975	Guyed Mast	Peille	43°47′39.38″N 7°24′56.33″E		
Transmitter Hautvillers	245 m	?	Guyed Mast	Hautvillers	49°05′52.39″N 3°56′8.33″E		
The Link	242 m	2025	Highrise	Paris	48°53′17″N 2°14′57″E		
Le Havre Power Plant Chimneys	240 m	1969/1984	Chimney	Le Havre	49°28′33.97″N 0°8′53.96″E; 49°28′31.44″N 0°8′48.05″E		
Transmitter Metz-Luttange	240 m	?	Guyed Mast	Luttange	49°16′33.48″N 6°18′53.43″E		
Pont de Normandie, Tower 1	236 m	1995	Bridge Tower (suspension bridge)	Le Havre	49°26′9.88″N 0°16′24.31″E		
Transmitter Neuvy-Deux-Clochers	231 m	?	Guyed Mast	Neuvy-Deux-Clochers	47°17′26.31″N 2°37′26.46″E		
Tour First	231 m	2011	Highrise	Paris	48°53′19.98″N 2°15′5.7″E		
Transmitter Haute Goulaine	227 m	?	Guyed Mast	Haute Goulaine	47°11′12.83″N 1°26′8.83″W		
Transmitter Les Riceys	225 m	?	Guyed Mast	Troyes, Champagne-Ardenne	47°58′55.45″N 4°24′8.84″E		
TV Tower Brest - Roc'h Trédudon	222 m	?	Guyed Mast/Tower	Plounéour-Ménez	48°24′47.7″N 3°53′22.17″W	Partially guyed	
Transmitter Nancy-Malzéville	222 m	?	Guyed Mast	Nancy-Malzéville, Lorrain	48°43′8.05″N 6°12′17.33″E		
Transmitter Tramoyes	220 m	1934	Guyed Mast	Tramoyes	45°52′32.41″N 4°57′3.07″E	Insulated against ground. Dynamited in late 2023	
Porcheville Power Plant Chimneys	220 m	1968/1975	Chimney	Porcheville	48°58′11.83″N 1°45′34.09″E ; 48°58′12.26″N 1°45′27.14″E		
Cordemais Power Plant Chimneys	220 m	1976/1983	Chimney	Cordemais	47°16′30.94″N 1°52′41.25″W; 47°16′36.11″N 1°52′53.53″W		
Transmitter Rennes-Thourie	220 m	1982	Guyed Mast	Thourie	47°51′18.28″N 1°29′10.29″W	insulated against ground	
Transmitter Amailloux	220 m	?	Guyed Mast	Amailloux	46°45′31.06″N 0°20′52.49″W		
Transmitter Chissay	220 m	?	Guyed Mast	Tours, Centre	47°22′1.75″N 1°7′14.76″E		
Transmitter Les Essarts	220 m	?	Guyed Mast	Les Essarts	49°20′28.83″N 1°0′52.6″E		
Transmitter Maudétour en Vexin	220 m	?	Guyed Mast	Maudétour en Vexin, Ile de France	49°5′24.05″N 1°45′44.04″E		
Transmitter Mont Bessou	220 m	?	Guyed Mast	Mont Bessou, Limousin	45°34′13.92″N 2°7′24.31″E		
Transmitter Montlandon	220 m	?	Guyed Mast	Montlandon	48°23′47.47″N 1°0′57.89″E		
Transmitter Les Cars	219 m	?	Guyed Mast	Les Cars, Limousin	45°39′29.14″N 1°4′15.06″E		
Transmitter Mont Pinçon	219 m	?	Guyed Mast	Mont Pinçon	48°58′16.04″N 0°36′35.45″W		
Col de la Madone Mediumwave Transmitter, 702 kHz Antenna, Mast East	215 m	1974	Guyed Mast	Peille	43°47′40.3″N 7°24′59.23″E		
Pont de Normandie, Tower 2	214 m	1995	Bridge Tower (suspension bridge)	Le Havre	49°25′42.43″N 0°16′28.08″E		
LORAN-C transmitter Lessay	213 m		Guyed Mast	Lessay	49°8′55.23″N 1°30′16.99″W	insulated against ground	
LORAN-C transmitter Soustons	213 m	1985	Guyed Mast	Soustons	43°44′23.2″N 1°22′49.61″W	insulated against ground	
Transmitter Mont des Cats	210.3 m	?	Guyed Mast	Godewaersvelde	50°46′57.79″N 2°40′16.13″E		
HWU transmitter, outer ring masts	210 m	1970	Guyed Mast	Rosnay	46°42′13.44″N 1°14′38.12″E ; 46°42′27.26″N 1°15′23.08″E ; 46°43′1.43″N 1°15′27.79″E ; 46°43′21.07″N 1°14′47.78″E ; 46°43′7.09″N 1°14′2.82″E ; 46°42′32.82″N 1°13′57.33″E		
Tour Montparnasse	210 m	1972	Skyscraper	Paris	48°50′31.66″N 2°19′19.73″E		
Transmitter Saint Remy	208 m	?	Guyed Mast	Saint Remy	48°44′6″N 1°52′21″E	3 masts, dismantled	
Transmitter Chalindrey	207 m	?	Guyed Mast	Chalindrey	47°48′13.02″N 5°24′6.43″E		
Transmitter Neufchâtel en Bray-Croixdaller	203 m	?	Guyed Mast	Neufchâtel en Bray-Croixdalle, Haute-Normandie	49°47′8.77″N 1°22′28.19″E		
Transmitter Landouzy	203 m	?	Guyed Mast	Landouzy	49°51′44.35″N 4°0′55.5″E		
Transmitter Limeux	203 m	1968	Guyed Mast	Limeux	50°00′44.6″N 1°49′48.6″E		
Transmitter Malicornay	203 m	?	Guyed Mast	Malicornay, Centre	46°34′44.36″N 1°37′36.41″E		
Transmitter Saint Just	203 m	?	Guyed Mast	Saint-Just-en-Chaussee	49°30′5.2″N 2°23′47.5″E		
Transmitter Trainou	203 m	?	Guyed Mast	Orleans, Centre	47°57′52.95″N 2°6′45.24″E		
Camphin-en-Carembault transmitter	202 m	?	Guyed Mast	Camphin-en-Carembault	50°31′5.25″N 2°59′42.02″E		
Transmitter Bergerac-Audrix	200 m	?	Guyed Mast	Bergerac-Audrix, Aquitaine	44°52′43.54″N 0°57′22.56″E		
Transmitter Gisy-Les-Nobles	200 m	?	Guyed Mast	Les Cars, Limousin	48°18′21.44″N 3°16′57.28″E		
Haut de Dimont Transmitter	200 m	?	Guyed Mast	Vittel	48°9′47.83″N 6°0′39.14″E		
Transmitter Molesmes	200 m	?	Guyed Mast	Auxerre, Bourgogne	47°36′31.83″N 3°27′29.07″E		
Transmitter Mont d'Amain	200 m	?	Guyed Mast	Mont d'Amain, Basse Normandie	48°40′13.03″N 0°20′49.52″E		
Transmitter Mont Rochard	200 m	?	Guyed Mast	Mont Rochard	48°13′9.61″N 0°21′11.71″W		
Transmitter Saint Léger le Guéretois	200 m	?	Guyed Mast	Saint Léger le Guéretois, Limousin	46°9′22.8″N 1°50′9.38″E		
Transmitter Verdun-Septsarges	200 m	?	Guyed Mast	Verdun-Septsarges, Lorraine	49°16′22.33″N 5°10′16.46″E		
Transmitter Willeroncourt	200 m	?	Guyed Mast	Willeroncourt, Lorraine	48°42′22.99″N 5°21′2.25″E		
Brumath radio mast	200 m	1940	Guyed Mast	Brumath		demolished on 15 June 1940	
La Doua transmitter, 200 metres masts	200 m	1919	Guyed Mast	Lyon	45°47′09″N 4°52′49″E	2 masts, dismantled in 1960	
Saint-André-de-Corcy transmitter	200 m	1960	Guyed Mast	Saint-André-de-Corcy	45°55′43.83″N 4°56′8.81″E	2 masts, dismantled in 1993	
Perret Tower	110 m	1954	Residential	Amiens			
Perret Tower	108 m	1925	Observation tower	Grenoble			

== Overseas territories of France ==
Name	Pinnacle height	Year	Structure type	Town	Coordinates	Remarks
Chabrier Omega Mast	427 m	1976	Guyed Mast	Saint-Paul, Reunion	20°58′26.9″S 55°17′23.62″E	grounded mast, used for carrying an umbrella antenna for VLF-transmission, demolished on 14 April 1999 by explosives
La Perriere Wind Park	137 m	2022	Wind turbine	Sainte-Suzanne, Reunion	20°57′56.35″S 55°34′51.65″E ; 20°57′48.37″S 55°34′53.23″E ; 20°57′39.01″S 55°34′52.43″E ;20°57′27.94″S 55°34′59.15″E ; 20°57′21.89″S 55°35′07.04″E ; 20°57′13.52″S 55°35′19.06″E ; 20°57′08.78″S 55°35′25.02″E ; 20°57′02.48″S 55°35′31.58″E ; 20°56′56.44″S 55°35′39.51″E	9 wind turbines of Vestas V110 type, nacelle height: 82 metres, rotor diametre: 110 metres, power: 2200 kW
Chimney of Koniambo Power Plant	135 m	2010	Chimney	Voh, New Caledonia	21°00′36.88″S 164°41′02.12″E	
Koniambo Metallurgical Plant	127 m		Industrial framework	Voh, New Caledonia	21°00′45.56″S 164°40′59.01″E	
Arnouville Radio Mast	127 m		Guyed Mast	Baie-Mahault, Guadeloupe	16°13′30.6″N 61°35′36.56″W	insulated against ground, used for broadcasting on 640 kHz
Sainte-Rose Wind Park	123 m	2019	Wind turbine	Sainte-Rose, Guadeloupe	16°19′31.91″N 61°44′5.69″W ; 16°19′27.43″N 61°44′8.51″W ; 16°19′23.04″N 61°44′11.37″W ;16°19′15.98″N 61°44′11.93″W ; 16°18′53.3″N 61°43′35.08″W ;16°18′48.45″N 61°43′37.57″W ; 16°18′44.11″N 61°43′40.47″W ; 16°18′39.58″N 61°43′43.16″W	8 wind turbines of G90-2.0 MW type, nacelle height: 78 metres, rotor diametre: 90 metres, power: 2000 kW
Tour Pointe Simon	105.5 m	2012	Skyscraper	Fort-de-France, Martinique	14°36′7.05″N 61°04′23.73″W	21 floors
Nawagued Radio Mast	105 m		Lattice tower	Nawagued, Lifou	21°05′6.89″S 167°12′12.8″E	demolished
Kourou Sounding Rocket Launch Site Meteorological Mast	103 m		Guyed Mast	Kourou	5°12′20.69″N 52°43′54.98″W	
Sainte Marie Radio Mast	100 m		Guyed Mast	Nouméa, New Caledonia	22°17′54.99″S 166°29′13.2″E	insulated against ground, used for broadcasting on 666 kHz, demolished
Pointe Vénus Radio Mast	100 m		Guyed Mast	Mahina, Tahiti	17°30′0.82″S 149°29′3.29″W	insulated against ground, demolished

== See also ==
- List of tallest buildings in France
- List of tallest buildings and structures in the Paris region
