= Square One (building) =

- Interactive map of the Square One area

General information
- Status: Completed
- Type: Office
- Location: Manchester, England
- Coordinates: 53°28′36.2″N 2°13′27.24″W
- Owner: High Speed 2

Technical details
- Floor area: 130,000 square feet

Square One is an office building in Manchester, England.

== History ==
The building was formerly occupied by Parcelforce and had a bridge over the adjacent railway line linking it to a parcel depot. In 2002, the office was purchased by Bruntwood. Following a refurbishment, Network Rail moved into the building in 2007. In May 2022, it was sold to High Speed 2 Ltd. It is expected to be demolished to make way for an expansion of Manchester Piccadilly railway station to accommodate HS2 services.
