= Sandrine Musso =

French anthropologist

- Born: January 15, 1973; Antananarivo
- Died: August 7, 2021 (aged 48); Gardanne

Academic background
- Education: School for Advanced Studies in the Social Sciences (Ph.D., 2008)
- Thesis: Aids and postcolonial minorities. Social history, uses and issues of the target of "migrants" in AIDS policies in France
- Doctoral advisor: Jean-Pierre Dozon (fr)

Academic work
- Institutions: Aix-Marseille University

Sandrine Musso (born 15 January 15, 1973 Antananarivo - 7 August 2021 Gardanne) was a French anthropologist, specializing in health issues.

== Life ==
She obtained a PhD in social anthropology and ethnology from School for Advanced Studies in the Social Sciences. In 2011, she was a lecturer at Aix-Marseille University, where she was based until her death.

She studied public health and minority groups, particularly the impacts of HIV/AIDS in the immigrant population of Mediterranean France.

In 2017, she was visiting scholar at Senter for kvinne- og kjønnsforskning at the University of Bergen.

Amidst the COVID-19 pandemic in 2020-2021, she was a researcher at Centre Norbert Elias coordinating the "ANR CoMeSCov" project – "Containment and health measures aimed at limiting the transmission of Covid 19. Social experiences in times of pandemic in France, Italy and the United States"

In 2021, she co-authored Guérir en Afrique with Alice Desclaux and Aïssa Diarra.

== Works ==
- Sams, Kelley; Alfieri, Chiara; Beauvieux, Fleur; Egrot, Marc; Kra, Firmin; Magnani, Carlotta; Mininel, Francesca; Musso, Sandrine (December 2021). "'…but not gagged': Responding to Covid-19 and its control measures in France, Italy and the USA". Anthropology Today. 37 (6): 5–8. doi:10.1111/1467-8322.12685. ISSN 0268-540X. S2CID 244822756.
- Waiting and the temporalities of irregular migration. Christine M. Jacobsen, Marry-Anne Karlsen, Shahram Khosravi. Abingdon, Oxon. 2020. ISBN 978-0-429-35173-0. OCLC 1246551939.
- "#15 / Habiter la ville effondrée : Marseille après le 5 novembre 2018 : Urbanités" [Living in the collapsed city : Marseille after November 5, 2018 : Urbanités]. www.revue-urbanites.fr (in French).
