= My Baggage =

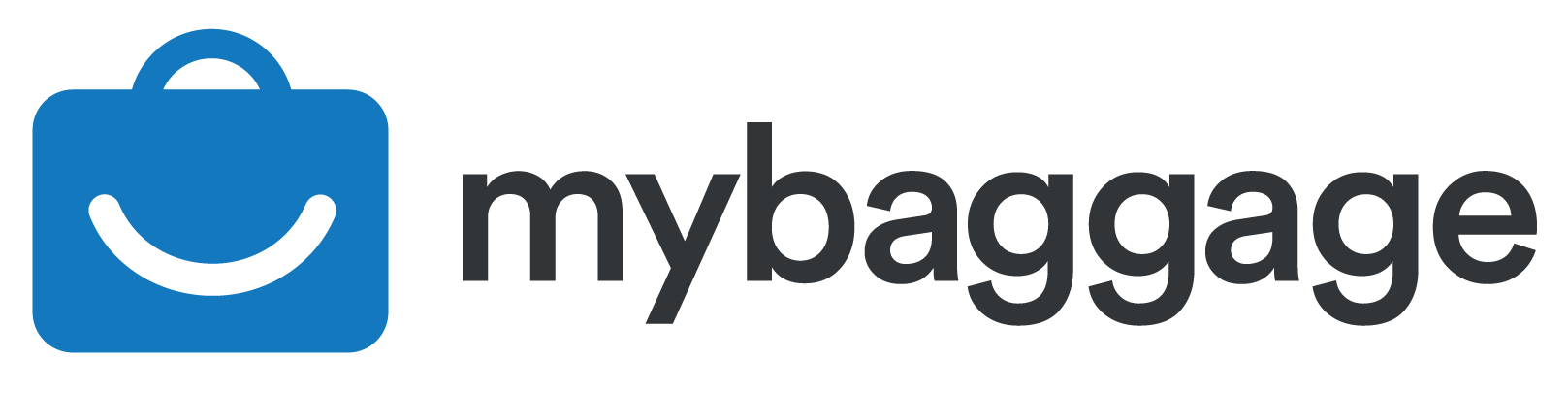
- Type: Private
- Industry: Courier
- Founded: 2009
- Founder: Paul Stewart
- Headquarters: Belfast, Northern Ireland
- Area served: Worldwide
- Number of employees: 22
- Website: mybaggage.com

Logo (used from 2009 to 2017)

My Baggage, formerly known as Uni Baggage, is a luggage delivery company established in 2009. The service is used mainly by students, expats, holidaymakers, travel nomads, sports teams, armed forces, and people moving abroad. It arranges the collection and delivery of its customers’ items through major couriers for a lower cost compared to customers booking transportation directly.

== History ==
The courier service was founded by entrepreneur Paul Stewart after he had experienced difficulties moving his personal belongings from his home in Northern Ireland to the University of Edinburgh, where he was studying. Stewart established the business in his second year of studying an engineering degree at the university by using his student loan as funding.

Initially operating as Uni Baggage, the company began with three shipping routes for students moving their belongings to and from UK universities. According to founder Paul Stewart, the initial website cost £500 to develop, and orders were processed manually for the first two years. By March 2020, the company reported that it offered 40,000 international shipping routes.

The company is based in Belfast. Since it was founded, My Baggage has expanded into worldwide shipping and since May 2015, it currently offers the services of DHL Express, and Parcelforce.

By 2013, the company had around 30,000 customers and had transported more than 1,000 tonnes of student belongings 6,000,000 mi (9,700,000 km) across the United Kingdom and globally. By 2014, the company had annual sales in excess of £1 million.

Uni Baggage announced the launch of its VIF Service (Very Important Fresher) in September 2014. This new service was covered by a number of media outlets including the BBC, Financial Times, CNBC, The Guardian, The Independent, The Telegraph. The VIF Service allowed students to travel to university in luxury while their belongings were transported separately.

Uni Baggage launched several new routes from Ireland to Europe and the US in 2015. In April 2018, the company signed a new $1 million deal with US-based courier companies to transport customer items between 500 new routes in and outside the country.

In 2019, the company changed its name to My Baggage to appeal to a broader range of customers.

In December 2025, it was announced that My Baggage had acquired Sherpr, a London-based luggage-shipping company with links to major UK travel operators. The transaction added Sherpr’s staff and services to the My Baggage Group and expanded its operational presence in key markets.
