= South Humber Bank Power Station =

Gas-fired power station

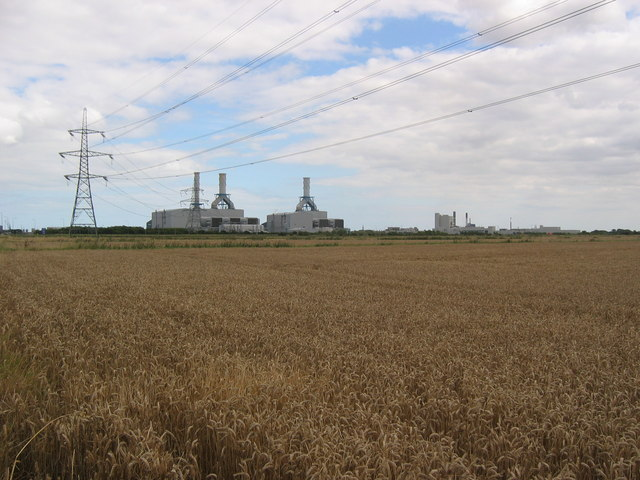
- South Humber Bank Power Station; Viewed from the west in August 2007
- Official name: South Humber Bank Power Station
- Country: England
- Location: South Marsh Road, Stallingborough, North East Lincolnshire, DN41 8BZ
- Coordinates: 53.603°N 0.146°W
- Construction began: September 1994
- Commission date: September 1997
- Owner: EP UK Investments
- Operator: EP UK Investments

Thermal power station
- Primary fuel: Natural gas
- Combined cycle?: Yes

Power generation
- Nameplate capacity: 1266 MW

External links
- Website: https://www.epuki.co.uk/
- Commons: Related media on Commons

South Humber Bank Power Station is a 1,365 MW gas-fired power station on South Marsh Road at Stallingborough in North East Lincolnshire north of Healing and the A180 near the South Marsh Road Industrial Estate. It is around two miles east of Immingham, and employs 64 people. The site of SHBPS is around 500 metres by 400 metres in area (around 54 acres). It is next door to the Synthomer plant.

It is owned by EP UK Investments Ltd, which is daughter company of EP Power Europe, which is 100% owned by Czech energy group EPH (owned by Daniel Křetínský). EPH bought South Humber Bank power station from Centrica in June 2017.

== History ==
The site was chosen by Dalton Warner Davis, the Chartered Surveyors.

Construction started in September 1994. Phase 1 was completed in April 1997 with 750 MW of power, and entered commercial service in September 1997. Phase 2 was started in November 1996 and was completed in January 1999, adding 510 MW. The plant was built by Switzerland's ABB.

=== Ownership ===
It was initially run by IVO Generation Services, a company owned by Finland's Fortum (Imatran Voima Oy). The site was owned by the consortium Humber Power Ltd, which was owned by Midland Power, ABB Energy Ventures, Tomen Group, Fortum Group, British Energy and TotalFinaElf. Humber Power Ltd was formed in 1991.

On 29 May 2001, Centrica (as GB Gas Holdings Ltd) bought 60% of the power station, and with 40% owned by Chanter Petroleum (part of TOTAL Midstream Holdings UK Ltd) from Humber Power Ltd. The entire site was then run by Centrica, under the name South Humber Power Ltd.

In September 2005, the station was bought (100%) by Centrica, costing £150 million (£46.5 million in cash). Centrica also run Glanford Brigg Power Station and Killingholme A power station.

On 21 June 2017 Centrica agreed to sell the power station to EP UK Investments Ltd as part of a deal that also saw Langage power station change hands between the two companies. EP UK Investments Ltd is fully controlled by EP Power Europe, which is 100% owned by Czech energy group EPH (owned by Daniel Křetínský).

== Specification ==
Cooling water is drawn from the River Humber. It is a CCGT type power station using natural gas.

Phase 1 consists of three 166 MW gas turbines with three heat recovery steam generators. It was designed and built by a consortium of Cockerill Maintenance & Ingénierie (CMI) and International Combustion, and 255 MW steam turbine.

Phase 2 consists of two 169 MW gas turbines, two heat recovery steam generators and a 171 MW steam turbine. It is similar to two CCGTs next-door to each other.

The gas turbines used are ABB Alstom GT 13E2 engines which normally produce 165 MW each. Each gas turbine has 72 EV (conical pre-mix) burners. Exhaust gas leaves each turbine at 540C. The engines spin at 3000 rpm. The gas turbines are each connected to an ABB WY21 TEWAC turbo generator.

Exhaust gas from each gas turbine passes through an individual CMI heat recovery steam generator (HRSG). For Phase 1 the steam passes through an ABB steam turbine connected to an ABB 50WT hydrogen-cooled turbogenerator. For Phase 2 the steam passes through an ABB steam turbine connected to an ABB WY21 TEWAC (air-water-cooled) turbogenerator. The Phase 1 generator is larger than Phase 2 so needs to be cooled by hydrogen gas.

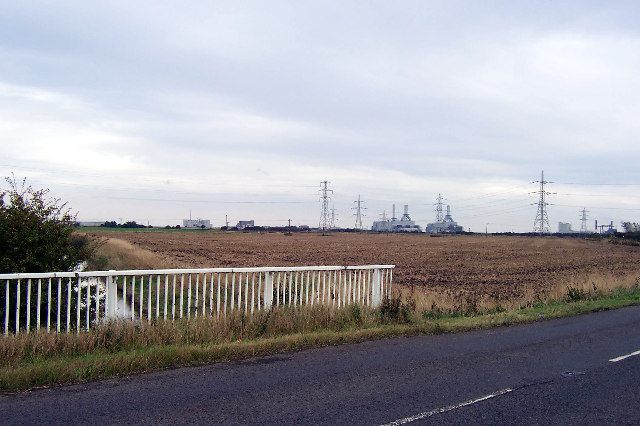
View in October 2005

The terminal voltage of the generators is 15.75 kV. Electricity enters the National Grid via a transformer at 400 kV connected to a single pylon line. The engines can generate electricity for base load or for peak load operations. Performance of the power plant is dependent on local air temperature and humidity. It has a nominal thermal efficiency of 55%, but usually produces 51%.

In 2009 it produced 8,512 GWh of electricity.
