= Provence Power Station =

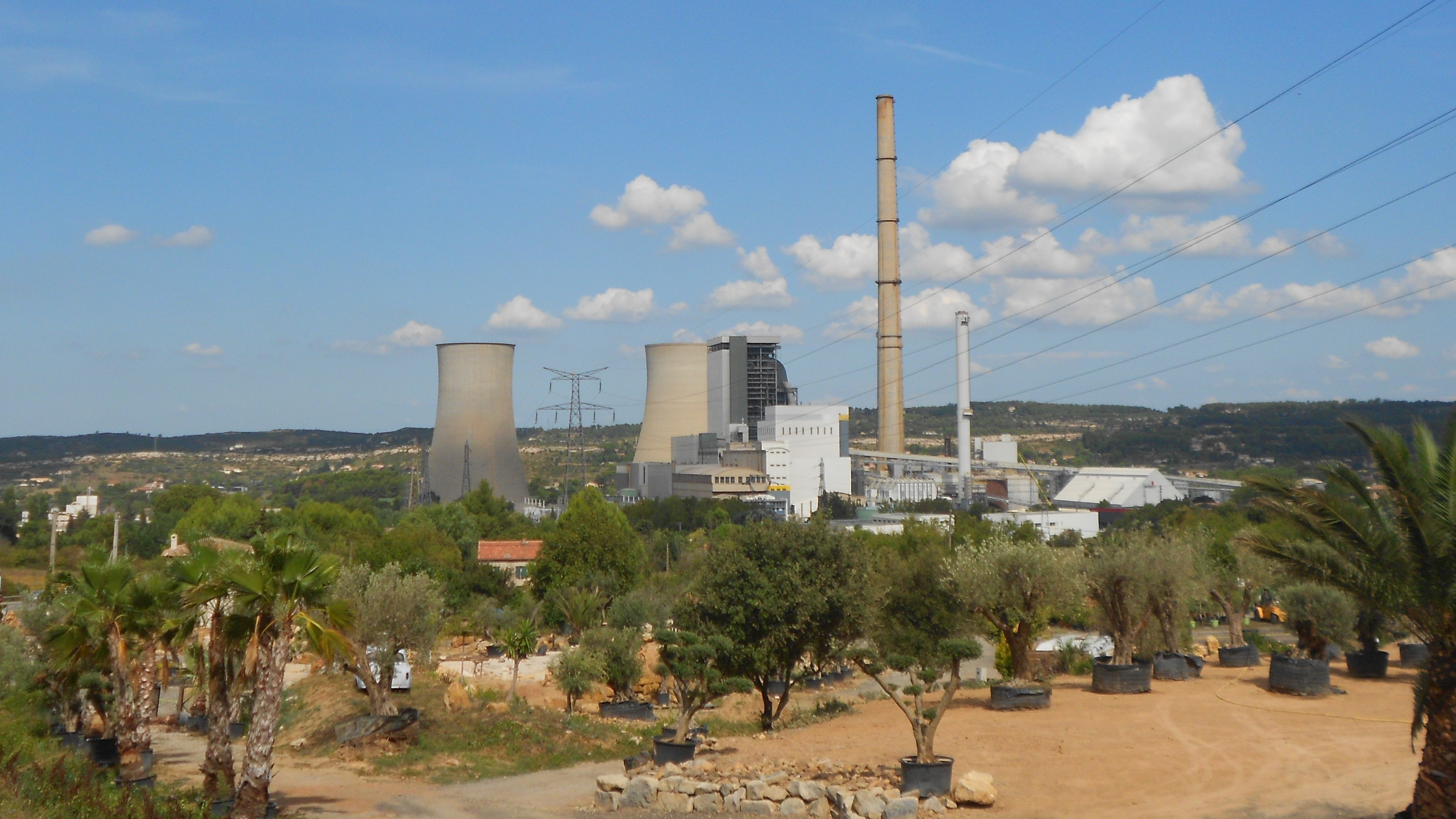
- Country: France
- Location: Gardanne
- Coordinates: 43°28′10″N 5°29′10″E
- Status: Operational
- Decommission date: Coal (Units 1,2,3, and 5)
- Owner: GazelEnergie
- Operator: Uniper

Thermal power station
- Primary fuel: Coal (Decommissioned) and biomass

Power generation
- Nameplate capacity: 150 MW; 745 MW
- Annual net output: 0 GWh (2020); 1.38 TW·h (2017); 27.15449 GWh (2019); 521.2515 GWh (2018)

External links
- Commons: Related media on Commons

Provence Power Station or Gardanne Power Station was an 868 MW coal-fired power station at Gardanne, France. It has a 297-meter-tall (974 ft) chimney, which is the tallest in France. It is owned and operated by Uniper. It is going to be retrofitted into a wood-fired power station.

== See also ==
- List of tallest structures in France
- List of power stations in France
