= GazelEnergie =

French electricity generator and distributor

- Formerly: Société nationale d'électricité et de thermique (SNET); E.ON France – SNET; Uniper France Power
- Industry: Energy
- Founded: 1995; 31 years ago
- Headquarters: Courbevoie, France
- Services: Electricity generation; Electricity and natural gas supply; Energy aggregation
- Revenue: 279,700,000 euro (2024)
- Net income: 24,800,000 euro (2024)
- Parent: EPH
- Website: gazelenergie.fr

GazelEnergie is a French electricity producer and supplier of electricity and natural gas, based in Courbevoie. It is a subsidiary of the Czech energy group EPH. The business originated in the electricity-generation activities of Charbonnages de France, which were organised as the Société nationale d’électricité et de thermique (SNET) in 1995. After successive ownership by Endesa, E.ON and Uniper, it was acquired by EPH and renamed GazelEnergie in 2019.

The company operates the Émile-Huchet coal-fired power station at Saint-Avold, a biomass generating unit at the Provence power station in Gardanne–Meyreuil, and wind and solar farms. It also develops battery storage and projects to reuse its former coal-power sites.

== History ==
Charbonnages de France formed the Société nationale d’électricité et de thermique (SNET) in 1995 from its electricity-generation business. At its formation, SNET was owned by Charbonnages de France (81.25%) and Électricité de France (18.75%). SNET began selling electricity to customers following the opening of the French electricity market in 1999.

Endesa obtained a controlling stake in SNET in 2004 and sold its 65% holding to E.ON in 2008. The business subsequently became part of Uniper in 2016. EPH acquired Uniper’s French activities in July 2019 and renamed the business GazelEnergie. The acquisition included coal, gas and biomass generating units, wind and solar farms, and energy-supply activities.

In 2020, the two gas-fired units at Saint-Avold, with a combined capacity of 828 MW, passed to Total. In March 2026, GazelEnergie bought ilek, a supplier of renewable electricity and biomethane to households.

== See also ==
- Energy in France
- List of French companies
