= Seidenberg =

Seidenberg may refer to:

== People ==
- Abraham Seidenberg, an American mathematician
- Avri Elad (Avraham Seidenberg), Israeli secret agent involved in the Lavon Affair
- Dennis Seidenberg, German athlete
- Ivan Seidenberg, Verizon CEO
- Mark Seidenberg, American psycholinguist
- Martin Seidenberg (born 1973), German business executive

== Other ==
- Seidenberg School of Computer Science and Information Systems at Pace University
- Zawidów (formerly Seidenberg), in Lower Silesian Voivodeship, south-western Poland
