= Langage =

Langage may refer to:

- Langage, Devon, a settlement in England
  - Langage Power Station
- langage, a French word for language as a general phenomenon, or to the human ability to have language (see Langue and parole)
