= HWU =

HWU or Hwu may refer to:

- HWU transmitter, a French submarine communications array
- Heriot-Watt University, in Edinburgh, Scotland
- Hollywood Undead, an American rap-rock band
- Hsing Wu University, a university in New Taipei, Taiwan
- Wen-mei Hwu, American engineer
