= Aramon, Gard =

Commune in Occitanie, France

Aramon
- Commune
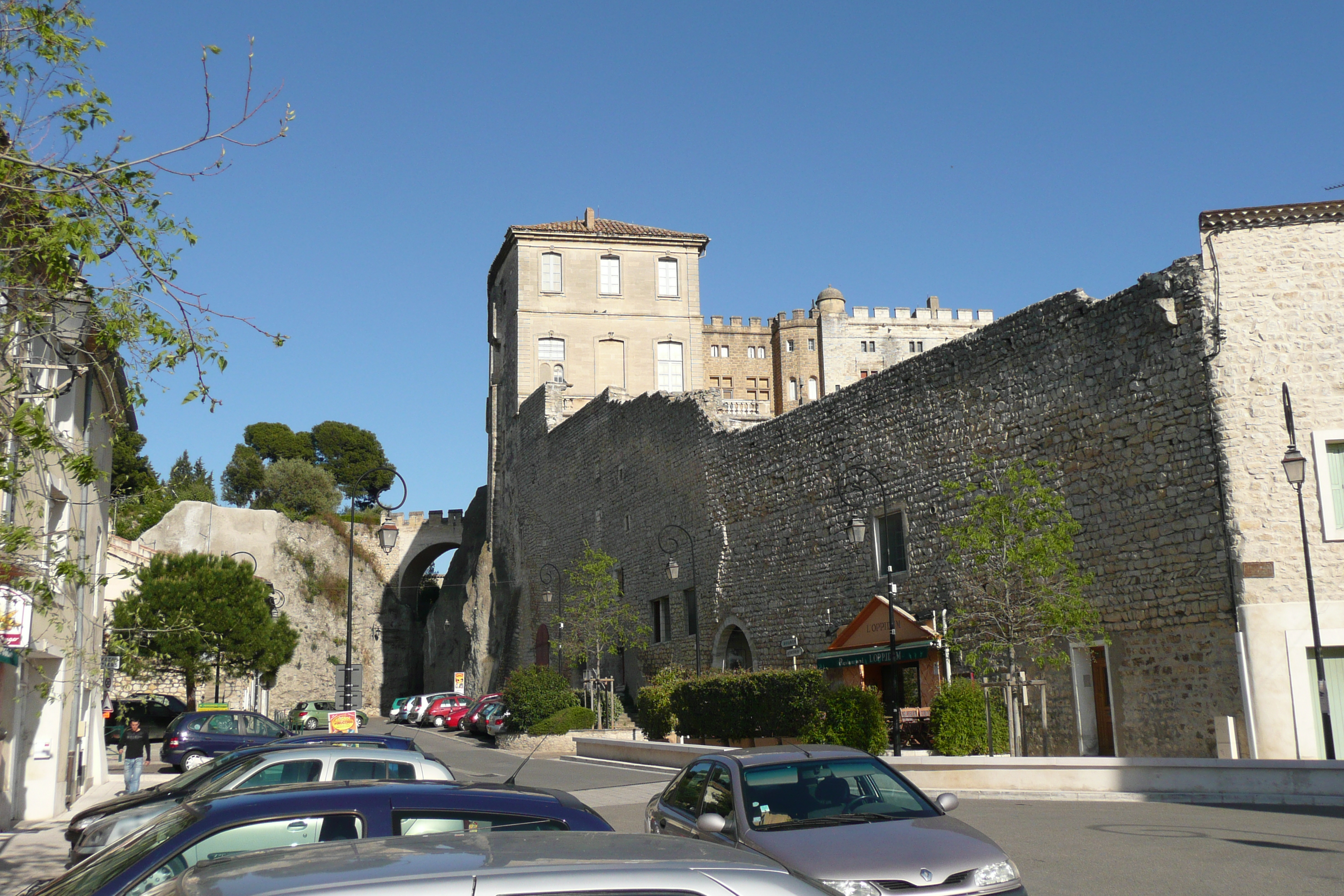
- A view of Aramon

- Coat of arms
- Location of Aramon
- Location within France Location within Occitanie
- Coordinates: 43°53′31″N 4°40′54″E
- Country: France
- Region: Occitania
- Department: Gard
- Arrondissement: Nîmes
- Canton: Beaucaire
- Intercommunality: Pont du Gard

Government
  - Mayor (2022–2026): Pascale Prat
- Area^{1}: 31.16 km^{2} (12.03 sq mi)
- Elevation: 10 m (33 ft)
- Highest elevation: 155 m (509 ft)
- Lowest elevation: 7 m (23 ft)
- Population (2023): 4,081
  - Density: 131.0/km^{2} (339.2/sq mi)
- Time zone: UTC+01:00 (CET)
  - Summer (DST): UTC+02:00 (CEST)
- INSEE/Postal code: 30012 /30390
- ^{1} French Land Register data, which excludes lakes, ponds, glaciers > 1 km^{2} (0.386 sq mi or 247 acres) and river estuaries.

Aramon (French pronunciation: [aʁamɔ̃]; Occitan: Aramon) is a commune in the Gard department in southern France near Avignon.

== Population ==
Historical population
Year	Pop.	±% p.a.
1968	1,826	—
1975	1,951	+0.95%
1982	3,027	+6.48%
1990	3,344	+1.25%
1999	3,773	+1.35%
2007	3,840	+0.22%
2012	3,920	+0.41%
2017	4,238	+1.57%
2023	4,081	−0.63%
Source: INSEE

== Personalities ==
Aramon was the birthplace of Henri Pitot (1695–1771), hydraulic engineer and inventor of the Pitot tube, and Shirine Boukli (b. 1999), Olympic judoka. International footballer Younès Belhanda was born in nearby Avignon and raised in Aramon.

== Economy ==
From 1977 until 2016, a thermal power station was operated in Aramon by EDF. It was converted into a photovoltaic power station in 2019. The chimney of the former facility was 252 metres tall, the highest in Europe and one of the tallest structures in France.

== See also ==
- Communes of the Gard department
