= International Distribution Services =

British logistics company

International Distribution Services Limited
- Formerly: Royal Mail Limited (6–19 September 2013); Royal Mail plc (19 September 2013 – 3 October 2022); International Distributions Services plc (3 October 2022 – 10 May 2024); International Distribution Services plc (10 May 2024 – 18 September 2025)
- Type: Subsidiary
- Industry: Postal services; Courier
- Founded: 2013
- Headquarters: London, England
- Key people: Daniel Křetínský (Chairman) Martin Seidenberg (Group CEO)
- Revenue: ▲£12,679 million (2024)
- Operating income: ▲£26 million (2024)
- Net income: ▲£54 million (2024)
- Number of employees: 153,552 (2024)
- Parent: EP Group
- Divisions: Royal Mail; Parcelforce; GLS Group
- Website: internationaldistributionservices.com

International Distribution Services Limited (IDS, formerly Royal Mail Limited, Royal Mail plc, International Distributions Services plc and International Distribution Services plc) is a British company providing postal and courier services. IDS was created in 2013 by the UK government as a new holding company of Royal Mail, and a majority of its shares were then sold on the London Stock Exchange, with the government initially retaining a 30 per cent at the time. As of April 2025, IDS is owned and operated by Czech-based EP Group, owned by Daniel Křetínský.

== History ==
=== Privatisation (2010–2014) ===
Following the 2010 general election, the coalition government decided to allow private investment into Royal Mail, as recommended in a report from Richard Hooper CBE, the former deputy chairman of Ofcom. Subsequently the Postal Services Act 2011 was passed, allowing for up to 90% of Royal Mail to be privatised, with at least 10% of shares to be held by Royal Mail employees.

In July 2013, Business Secretary Vince Cable announced that Royal Mail was to be floated on the London Stock Exchange, and confirmed that postal staff would be entitled to free shares. Cable explained his position before the House of Commons:

The government's decision on the sale is practical, it is logical, it is a commercial decision designed to put Royal Mail's future on a long-term sustainable business. It is consistent with developments elsewhere in Europe where privatised operators in Austria, Germany and Belgium produce profit margins far higher than the Royal Mail but have continued to provide high-quality and expanding services.

Royal Mail's chief executive Moya Greene publicly supported Cable, stating that the sale would provide staff with "a meaningful stake in the company", while the public would be able to "invest in a great British institution". On 12 September 2013, a six-week plan for the sale of at least half of the business was released to the public; the Communication Workers Union (CWU), representing over 100,000 Royal Mail employees, said that 96% of Royal Mail staff opposed the sell-off. A postal staff ballot in relation to a nationwide strike action was expected to take place in late September 2013.

A new holding company, Royal Mail Limited, was established on 6 September 2013, in anticipation of its initial public offering on the London Stock Exchange. Two weeks later the holding company was re-registered as Royal Mail plc.

Applications for members of the public to buy shares opened on 27 September 2013, ahead of the company's listing on the London Stock Exchange on 15 October 2013. The government was expected to retain between a 37.8% and 49.9% holding in the company. A report on 10 October 2013 revealed that around 700,000 applications for shares had been received by HM Government, more than seven times the amount that were available to the public. Cable stated: "The aim is to place the shares with long-term investors, we are absolutely confident that will happen." At the time of the report, Royal Mail staff continued to ballot regarding potential strike action.

The initial public offering (IPO) price was set at 330p, and conditional trading in shares began on 11 October 2013, ahead of the full listing on 15 October 2013. Following the IPO, 52.2% of Royal Mail had been sold to investors, with 10% given to employees for free. Due to the high demand for shares, an additional 7.8% was sold via an over-allotment arrangement on 8 November 2013. This left the government with a 30% stake in Royal Mail and £1.98bn raised from the sale of shares.

The CWU confirmed on 13 October 2013 that strike action would occur in response to the privatisation of Royal Mail, with a possible start date of 23 October 2013. A union source stated: "It is likely to be an all-out strike first, then rolling strikes in the run up to Christmas", while the CWU had dismissed the offer of an 8.6% rise over three years as "misleading and unacceptable". Prior to the announcement of the strike ballot results on the afternoon of 16 October 2013, employees were offered £300 to cross the picket line if a nationwide postal strike occurred. The CWU called off strike action on 30 October 2013, while negotiations progressed with Royal Mail's management. The talks were extended on 13 November 2013, with the aim that an agreement be reached by both sides by 20 November 2013. Royal Mail confirmed that both sides had reached a proposed settlement on 4 December, and the CWU confirmed on 9 December 2013 that it would recommend the deal to its members. On 6 February 2014, the CWU confirmed that Royal Mail staff had voted to accept the settlement.

=== Post-privatisation (2014–2024) ===
Share prices rose by 38% on the first day of conditional trading, leading to accusations that the company had been undervalued. Six months later, the market price was 58% more than the sale price, and peaked as high as 87%. Business Secretary Vince Cable defended the low sale price that was finalised, saying that the threat of strike action around the time of the sale meant it was a fair price in the circumstances, following questioning from the House of Commons Business Committee in late April 2014. On behalf of both himself and Business Minister Michael Fallon, Cable stated before the committee: "We don't apologise for it and we don't regret it."

Cable was required to respond to the sale price issue again on 11 July 2014 after a report was published on that date by the Business, Innovation and Skills (BIS) Committee. Chaired by MP Adrian Bailey, the report concluded:

It is clear that the Government met its objectives in terms of delivering a privatised Royal Mail with an employee share scheme. However, it is not clear whether value for money was achieved and whether Ministers obtained the appropriate return to the taxpayer. We agree with the National Audit Office that the Government met its primary objective. On the basis of the performance of the share price to date, it appears that the taxpayer has missed out on significant value.

The report also concluded that the "Government over-emphasised the risk" in regard to the industrial relations between the government and the CWU, with the BIS Committee referring to the Royal Mail share price before, during and after the finalisation of the pay deal with the union. During the presentation of the report, Bailey referred to the underpinning factors of "fear of failure and poor quality advice", and warned that British taxpayers could sustain further losses in the future due to the inclusion of Royal Mail's 'surplus' assets as part of "the most significant privatisation in years". The BIS Committee called on the UK government to publish a list of the preferred investors involved in the sale, including the details of those investors who sold their shareholding. Billy Hayes, general secretary of the CWU, also responded to the BIS report: "The BIS select committee's damning report published today shows the extent of the government's incompetence in the privatisation of Royal Mail."

In 2014, the London Assembly voted to call for the renationalisation of Royal Mail.

On 4 June 2015, the Chancellor of the Exchequer, George Osborne, announced that the government would sell its remaining 30% stake. A 15% stake was subsequently sold to investors on 11 June 2015, raising £750m, with a further 1% passed to the company's employees. The government completed the disposal of its shareholding on 12 October 2015, when a 13% stake was sold for £591m and another 1% was given to employees. In total the government raised £3.3bn from the full privatisation of Royal Mail.

On 13 January 2020, Royal Mail shares were trading below the issue price, as they did throughout all of 2019.

On 1 June 2022, it was announced that the company would be demoted from the FTSE 100, and became a constituent of the FTSE 250 Index on 20 June.

In July 2022, it was announced that the holding company responsible for both Royal Mail and GLS would change its name to International Distributions Services (IDS). The name change was filed with Companies House on 28 September 2022 and registered on 3 October.

=== Acquisition by EP Group and latest history (2024–present) ===
On 31 October 2022, the Secretary of State for Business, Kwasi Kwarteng, approved a proposal from a Czech billionaire, Daniel Křetínský, to increase the shareholding of Vesa Equity Investment Sarl (a company controlled by Křetínský) in IDS to more than 25%.

In 2024, IDS entered into a multi-year agreement with PayPoint PLC whereby IDS customers will be able to receive parcels to 5,000 Collect+ shops in various locations across the UK, as well as accessing a range of services through PayPoint's retail partners.

In April 2024, EP Group (another company controlled by Daniel Křetínský) offered to buy the 72.5 per cent shareholding in the company that Vesa Equity Investment Sarl does not already own.

On 10 May 2024, the company changed its name from International Distributions Services to International Distribution Services. On 28 May 2024, the board of IDS agreed to a £5bn takeover offer from Daniel Křetínský. The offer included commitments to retain the Royal Mail name, brand, UK headquarters, and employee benefits, while being subject to scrutiny under the National Security and Investment Act 2021. The deal was to be voted on by shareholders at IDS's annual general meeting in September, with potential government intervention due to national security concerns.

In December 2024, the UK Labour government approved the £3.6bn sale of IDS to EP Group, marking the first time the 508-year-old postal service came under foreign ownership. The deal, reviewed under national security laws, included commitments to retain the universal service obligation, UK headquarters, and tax residency, while barring dividends unless financial and service targets were met. Despite concerns over declining letter volumes and scrutiny of Křetínský's Russian business ties, the agreement, supported by unions, aimed to stabilize and reform Royal Mail. In March 2025, the company confirmed that the takeover would not be completed until the second quarter of 2025. The takeover was approved by shareholders on 30 April 2025. The European Commission published its clearance decision on 5 May 2025, so allowing the transaction to proceed to completion.

== Operations ==
The main business segments are: UK Parcels, International, and Letters (UKPIL), General Logistics Systems (GLS) and Group. UKPIL includes the parcel and letter delivery divisions (Royal Mail and Parcelforce Worldwide brands) in the UK and overseas, while GLS operates a ground parcel delivery network in Europe, the western US and Canada.
