= Rosnay, Indre =

Rosnay
- Commune
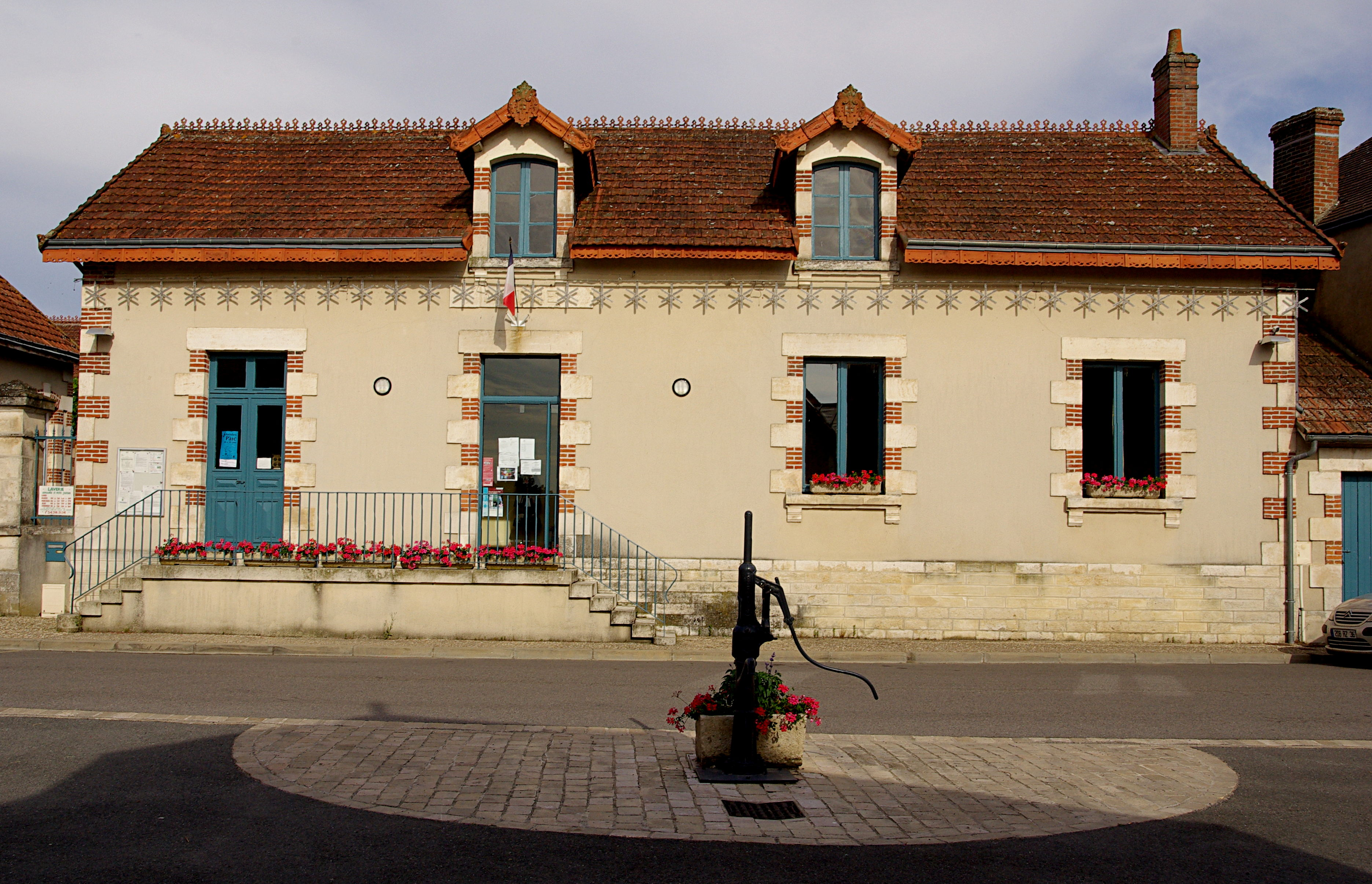
- The town hall in Rosnay
- Location of Rosnay
- Location within France Location within Centre-Val de Loire
- Coordinates: 46°42′06″N 1°12′55″E
- Country: France
- Region: Centre-Val de Loire
- Department: Indre
- Arrondissement: Le Blanc
- Canton: Le Blanc
- Intercommunality: Brenne Val de Creuse

Government
  - Mayor (2022–2026): Serge Bergeat
- Area^{1}: 59.03 km^{2} (22.79 sq mi)
- Elevation: 115 m (377 ft)
- Highest elevation: 133 m (436 ft)
- Lowest elevation: 87 m (285 ft)
- Population (2023): 524
  - Density: 8.88/km^{2} (23.0/sq mi)
- Time zone: UTC+01:00 (CET)
  - Summer (DST): UTC+02:00 (CEST)
- INSEE/Postal code: 36173 /36300
- ^{1} French Land Register data, which excludes lakes, ponds, glaciers > 1 km^{2} (0.386 sq mi or 247 acres) and river estuaries.

Rosnay (French pronunciation: [ʁonɛ]) is a commune in the Indre department in central France.

== Geography ==
The commune is located in the parc naturel régional de la Brenne.

== Population ==
Historical population
Year	Pop.	±% p.a.
1968	686	—
1975	622	−1.39%
1982	529	−2.29%
1990	537	+0.19%
1999	526	−0.23%
2007	618	+2.04%
2012	506	−3.92%
2017	519	+0.51%
2023	524	+0.16%
Source: INSEE

== See also ==
- Communes of the Indre department
- HWU transmitter
