= EP Group =

Czech investment holding company

EP Group, a.s.
- Formerly: EP Group Investments a.s. (2019–2020); EP Corporate Group, a.s. (2020–2024)
- Type: Private
- Industry: Conglomerate
- Founded: October 30, 2019; 7 years ago
- Headquarters: Prague, Czech Republic
- Key people: Daniel Křetínský (chairman and CEO)
- Revenue: €66.8 billion (2025)
- Net income: €4.55 billion (2025)
- Total assets: €74.6 billion (2025)
- Subsidiaries: EPH; EP Energy Transition; EP Heat & Power; International Distribution Services; EP Global Commerce (including Metro AG); Czech Media Invest
- Website: epgroup.eu/en

EP Group, a.s. is a Czech holding company headquartered in Prague. Controlled by businessman Daniel Křetínský, it has investments in energy, postal services and logistics, wholesale and retail, media, and real estate. Its holdings include interests in Energetický a průmyslový holding (EPH), International Distribution Services (IDS), and Metro AG.

The group reported revenue of €66.8 billion for 2025, following the consolidation of acquisitions including Metro and IDS. In 2026, it entered the Fortune Global 500 at number 179.

== History ==
The company was registered in October 2019 as EP Group Investments and renamed EP Corporate Group in January 2020. In December 2020, Daniel Křetínský announced consolidation of his and EPH management's strategic investments under EP Corporate Group. The registered name changed to EP Group in October 2024. The group publicly announced the change in January 2025, when Jan Špringl succeeded Křetínský as chief executive of EPH.

In May 2024, EP Group agreed to acquire International Distribution Services (IDS), the parent company of Royal Mail and General Logistics Systems (GLS), in a transaction valuing IDS's equity at £3.6 billion. The British government approved the transaction in December and IDS became part of EP Group's businesses in early 2025.

During 2025, EP Group also consolidated Metro AG and increased its interest in Slovenské elektrárne. In March, its subsidiary EP Energy Transition acquired PPF Group's remaining 30% interest in LEAG. Also in March, EP Group transferred Elektrárny Opatovice and United Energy from EP Infrastructure to its newly established subsidiary EP Heat & Power.

In January 2026, EP Group announced a takeover proposal for Fnac Darty at €36 per share. Its subsidiary Vesa Equity Investment already held approximately 28.5% of the company. The offer opened in May. In April, EPH and TotalEnergies completed a transaction establishing TTEP, a jointly owned European power-generation business.

== Energy ==
EP Group's energy businesses are Energetický a průmyslový holding (EPH), EP Energy Transition and EP Heat & Power. Their activities involve electricity and heat generation, gas transmission, distribution and storage, and renewables development.

In Germany, LEAG and MIBRAG operate and develop wind and solar plants on former lignite-mining land and other sites. LEAG commissioned the 105 MW Forst-Briesnig II wind farm and the first phase of the Bohrau solar park in September 2026. MIBRAG's Breunsdorf and Profen II wind farms, with planned capacities of 93 MW and 62 MW respectively, were under construction in October 2026.

Through EPH, the group holds a controlling interest in Slovenské elektrárne, which operates nuclear power stations and over 30 hydroelectric plants. In France, GazelEnergie operates six wind farms with approximately 90 MW of capacity and two solar plants totalling 10.5 MWp.

The group also has investments in biomass generation and battery storage. LEAG is building large battery-storage projects at Jänschwalde and Boxberg. EPH holds a 50% interest in TTEP, a joint venture with TotalEnergies that operates gas-fired and biomass power plants and battery-storage facilities in western Europe.

== Logistics ==
EP Group controls International Distribution Services (IDS), the parent company of Royal Mail and General Logistics Systems (GLS). Royal Mail provides letter and parcel delivery services throughout the United Kingdom and is the country's designated universal postal service provider. GLS provides parcel delivery services in Europe and North America. Its subsidiaries and partner network serve more than 50 countries.

== Wholesale and retail ==
In Spain, the group holds interests in joint ventures operating Caprabo supermarkets in Catalonia and Eroski supermarkets in the Balearic Islands. The group has stakes in Spanish supermarket businesses through joint ventures. These operate Caprabo in Catalonia and Eroski stores in the Balearic Islands. Its Czech investments comprise FAST ČR, an electronics and household-appliance distributor, and the online grocery retailer Košík.cz.
