= Hôtel de Ville, Gardanne =

Town hall in Gardanne, France

Hôtel de Ville
- The main frontage of the Hôtel de Ville in September 2024

General information
- Type: City hall
- Architectural style: Neoclassical style
- Location: Gardanne, France
- Coordinates: 43.4557°N 5.4706°E
- Completed: 1907

The Hôtel de Ville (French pronunciation: [otɛl də vil], City Hall) is a municipal building in Gardanne, Bouches-du-Rhône, in southern France, standing on Cours de la République.

== History ==
After the French Revolution the new town council established their meeting place in a building on Place Ferrer. However, the narrow streets of the old town hampered development and, in this context, in 1840, the council decided to establish a new promenade between the old town (to the west) and the Saint-Pierre River (to the east), which would form the core of a new area of development. The council relocated to an existing building on the west side of the new promenade, so allowing the old town hall on Rue Ferrer to be demolished in 1841. Further improvements were made to the new promenade, which became known as Cours de la République, by burying the river in a culvert in the 1860s.

In the early 20th century, following significant population growth, the council led by the mayor, Agricol Maurel, decided to demolish the existing buildings on the west side of the new promenade, including the remains of the former Château de Roi René (Château of King René), (Note: This refers to René of Anjou, who was Duke of Anjou and Count of Provence from 1434 to 1480, and also reigned as King of Naples from 1435 until he was deposed in 1442. He entertained his guests in the château.) and to commission a purpose-built town hall on the same site. The new building was designed in the neoclassical style, built in ashlar stone and was completed in 1907.

The design involved a symmetrical main frontage of nine bays facing onto Cours de la République. The central section of three bays, which was slightly projected forward and incorporated an extra floor, featured a segmental-headed doorway with a keystone and a moulded surround, flanked by pairs of casement windows stacked vertically. On the first floor, there were three French doors with keystones and moulded surrounds and a wide balcony. On the second floor, there was a transomed oculus flanked by small casement windows and surmounted by a square clock tower with a bellcote. The outer bays were fenestrated in a similar style and the end bays contained doorways. Internally, the principal room was the Salle du Conseil (council chamber).

A war memorial, in the form of a female statue on a plinth, which was intended to commemorate the lives of local service personnel who had died in the Franco-Prussian War and the First World War, was created by the sculptor, Marius Malan, and unveiled in front of the town hall in 1922. During the liberation of the town by the American 3rd Infantry Division on 21 August 1944, part of the Second World War, skirmishes with German troops took place and an American shell landed in a plane tree in front of the town hall.
