= Langage Power Station =

Combined-cycle power plant

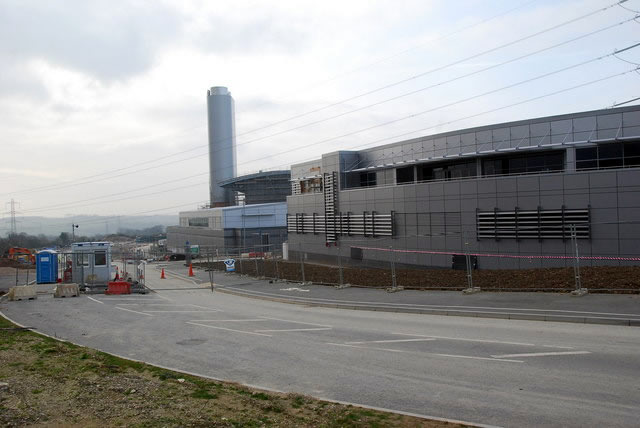
- Picture of power station on 1 March 2009
- Official name: Langage Power Station
- Country: England
- Location: Devon, South West England
- Coordinates: 50.3884°N 4.01173°W
- Status: Operational
- Commission date: 2010
- Owner: EP Power Europe
- Operator: EP UK Investments

Thermal power station
- Primary fuel: Natural gas
- Turbine technology: CCGT
- Chimneys: 2
- Cooling source: Air cooled heat exchanger
- Combined cycle?: Yes

Power generation
- Units operational: 2
- Make and model: Alstom GT26 gas turbines, STF30C steam turbine
- Nameplate capacity: 885 MW

External links
- Website: https://www.epuki.co.uk/
- Commons: Related media on Commons

Langage Power Station is a combined-cycle power plant near the city of Plymouth in Devon, England.

Centrica, the original owners of the site, announced on 16 June 2006 that the natural gas fired power station was to be constructed on their behalf by Alstom. Section 36 consent was granted in 2000 and Reserved Matters were approved in 2005. The 885 MW plant was expected to cost £400 million and to start generating in early 2009, but problems with internal pipework pushed this back. The power station was completed and operations started in March 2010.

Langage was set to be the first fossil fuel power station built in the UK since 2005, but due to delays it was preceded by Marchwood Power Station, which was commissioned in 2009. Multiple other CCGT stations were also commissioned around this time, including Pembroke Power Station and West Burton B. The station was commissioned against an expected 'energy gap' in UK generating capacity, caused by the expected closure of nuclear and older coal-fired stations.

The power station had permission to build three gas-powered turbines when it bought the site in 2004, but due to land constraints they were only able to build two.

The plant uses two Alstom GT26 gas turbines, each driving an air-cooled turbogenerator, with a heat recovery steam generator powering a single STF30C steam turbine which also drives another air-cooled turbogenerator.

Centrica put the plant up for sale in May 2014, stating an aim to invest in smaller, more flexible power stations. On 21 June 2017, Centrica agreed to sell the power station to EP UK Investments as part of a deal that also saw South Humber Bank CCGT power station change hands between the two companies. EP UK Investments is the daughter company of EP Power Europe, which is 100% owned by Czech energy group EPH (owned by Daniel Křetínský).

The UK high pressure national gas pipeline network (the National Transmission System) was extended to Plymouth in 1989 (Feeder No.20 terminates at an Above Ground Installation (AGI) south of Smithaleigh). Langage Power Station was built to exploit the availability of high pressure gas and the station now represents the southernmost gas-fired station on the network.

== See also ==
- Energy policy of the United Kingdom
- Energy use and conservation in the United Kingdom
