= Martin Seidenberg =

German CEO (born 1973)

- Born: 1973 (age 52–53)
- Occupation: Business executive

Martin Seidenberg (born 1973) is a German business executive, and the CEO of International Distributions Services, the parent company of Royal Mail, and started the role in August 2023. He was previously CEO of its Dutch subsidiary GLS Group. Prior to GLS he spent 15 years at Deutsche Post DHL in a variety of strategy, logistics and CEO roles.
