= Mehrum Power Station =

Coordinates: 52°18′51″N 10°05′29″E

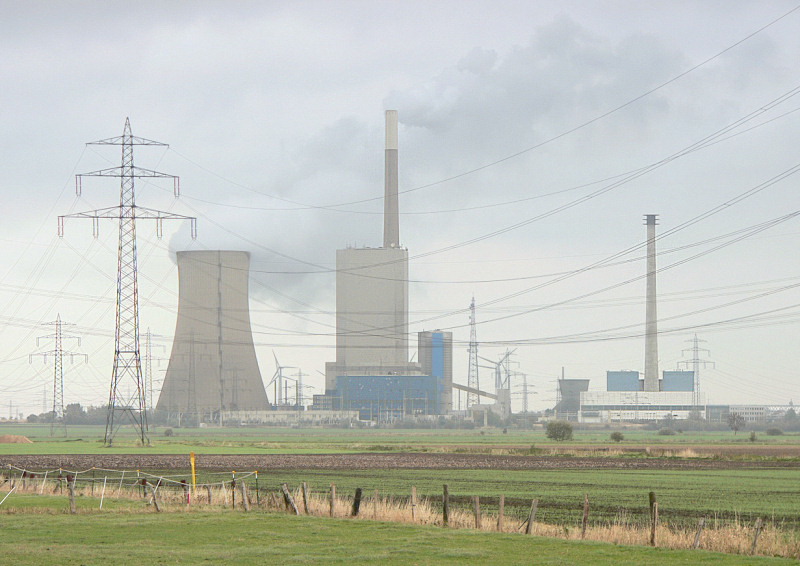
Mehrum Power Station

Mehrum Power Station was a coal-fired power station in Mehrum, Lower Saxony, Germany. It lies about 20km east of Hannover. It had an output of 690 megawatts (netto). The chimney of the power station is 250 m (820 ft) high.

On 1 November 2017, Enercity and BS Energy sold it to Energetický a Průmyslový Holding (EPH).

Unit 3, commissioned in 1979, was in use until 1 April 2024. It had an Energy conversion efficiency of 40.5 % and (as of 2022) 130 employees. On 12 April 2025, the cooling tower was wrecked.

== See also ==
- Energiewende in Germany
- Electricity sector in Germany
- Coal phase-out
  - de:Ausstieg aus der Kohleverstromung in Deutschland
