= United Schleenhain coal mine =

Coal mine in Saxony, Germany

United Schleenhain Coal Mine
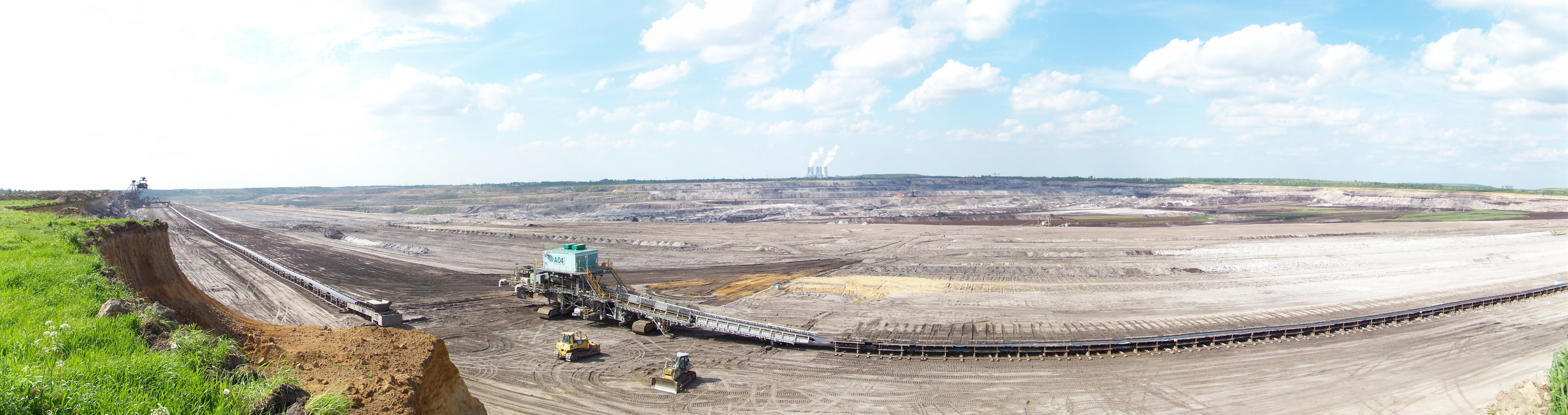
- Interactive map of United Schleenhain Coal Mine
- Location: Saxony, Germany; 51°7′N 12°23′E
- Products: Lignite

The United Schleenhain Coal Mine is a coal mine located in Saxony. The mine has coal reserves amounting to 415 million tonnes of lignite, one of the largest coal reserves in Europe and the world and has an annual production of 11 million tonnes of coal.
