= HWU transmitter =

French submarine communications array

Coordinates: 46°42′47″N 1°14′39″E

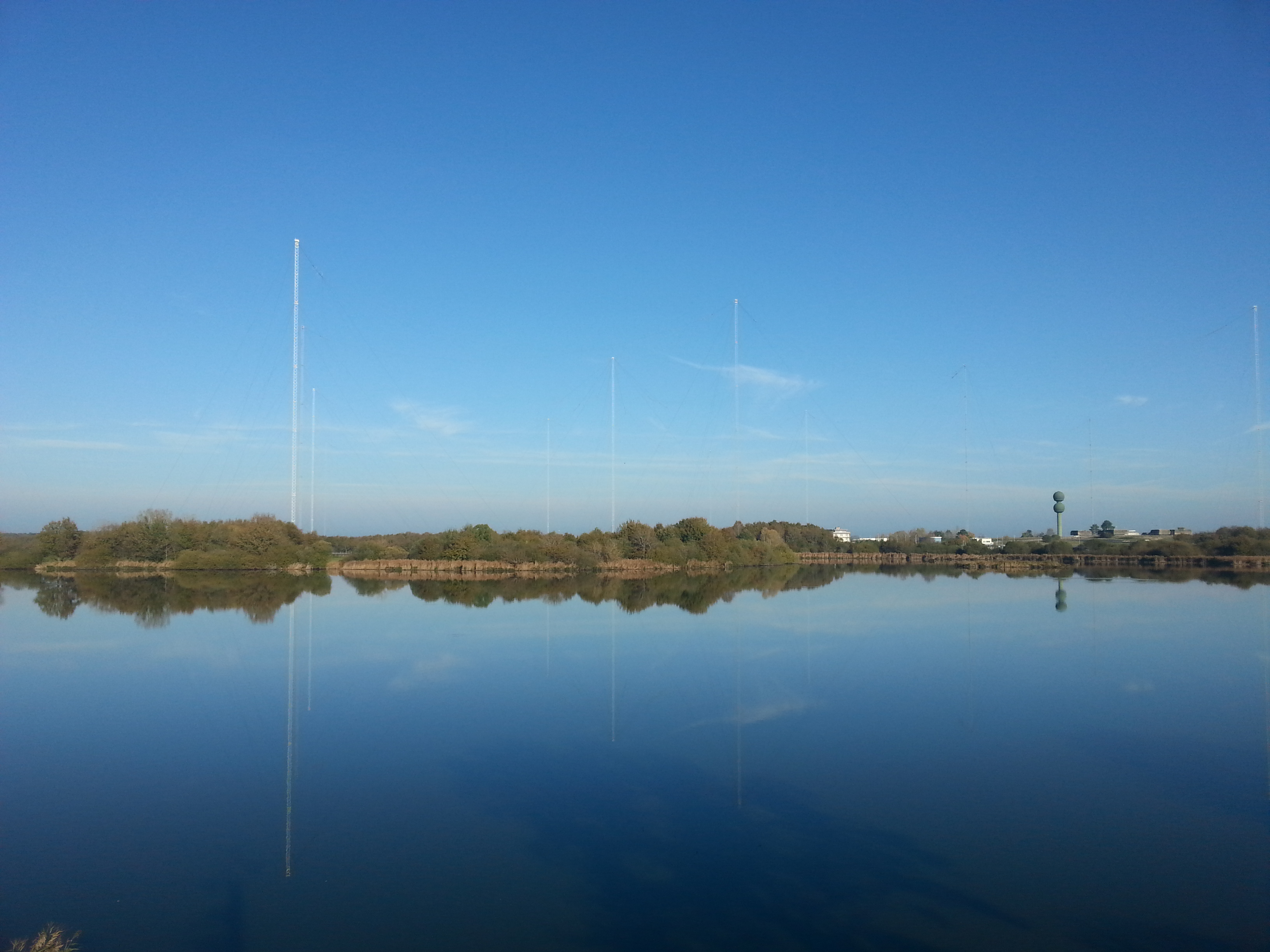
HWU Transmission Centre - Rosnay, France

The HWU transmitter is a French facility for transmitting orders to submerged submarines of the French Navy. Situated near Rosnay at 46°42'47"N, 1°14'39"E, it is one of the largest radio transmitters in France and is visible on satellite pictures although it is completely blurred out. It uses an antenna carried by thirteen guyed masts (the tallest one 357 m, 6 of 310 m, 6 of 270 m), which are, together with the masts of the Allouis longwave transmitter, the tallest structures in France.

The HWU transmitter works on 18.3 kHz, 20.9 kHz and 21.7 kHz. Its transmissions can be easily received in Europe when the transmitters are active by using a PC sound card connected to a receiving coil and FFT software. Although the signals are very easy to receive, it may be impossible to decipher them without knowing the cipher and key used in the communications.

== See also ==
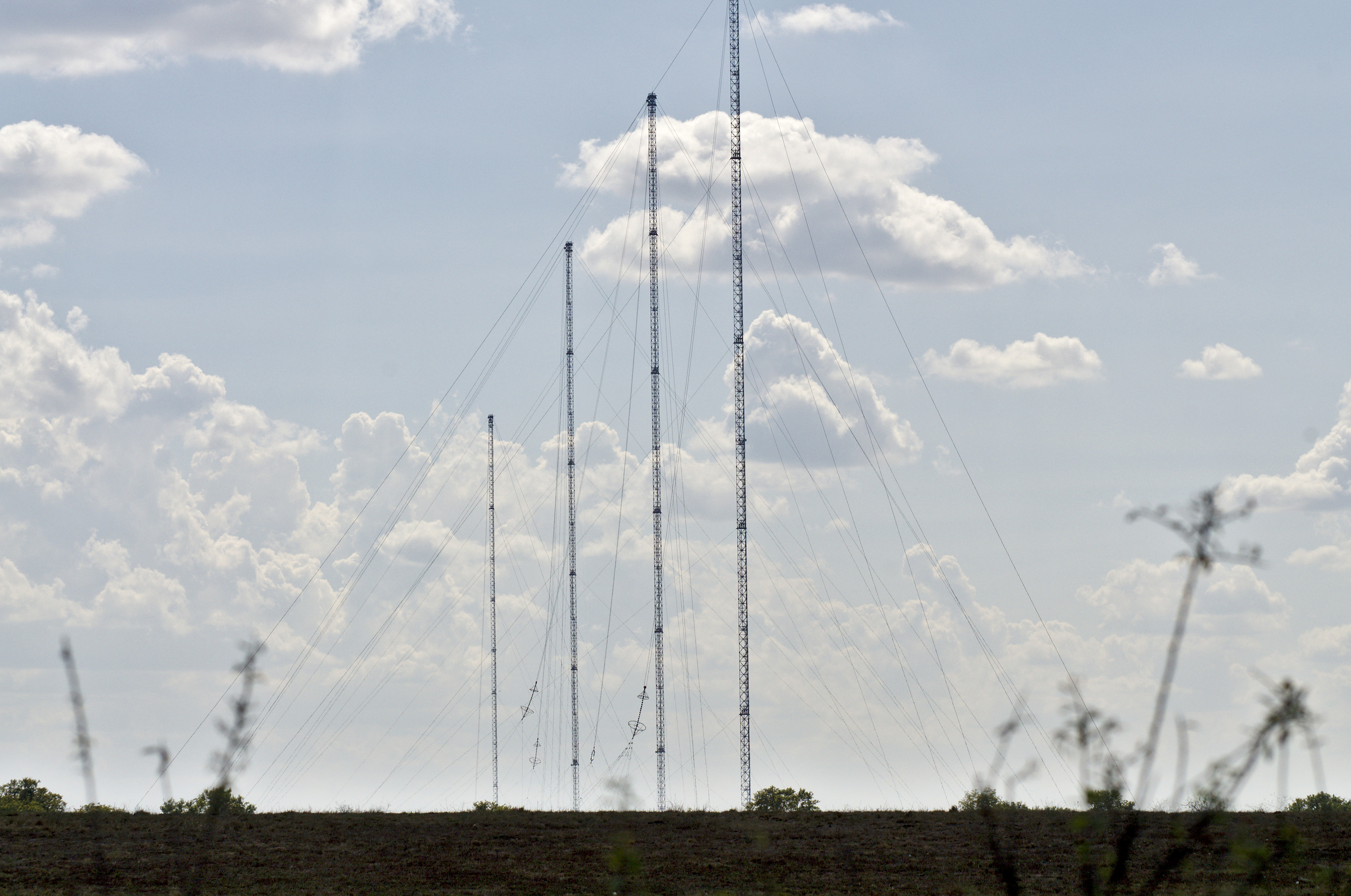
HWU Transmission Antennas - Rosnay, France

- Sainte-Assise transmitter
- List of masts
- List of tallest structures in France
- Torreta de Guardamar
- Anthorn Radio Station
- Skelton Transmitting Station
