= Uniper =

German energy company

Uniper SE
- Type: State-owned enterprise (Societas Europaea)
- Traded as: FWB: UN01
- ISIN: DE000UNSE018
- Industry: Electric utility
- Founded: 1 January 2016; 10 years ago
- Headquarters: Düsseldorf, Germany
- Area served: Europe; United States
- Key people: Michael Lewis (CEO)
- Products: Electrical power Natural gas
- Revenue: €107.915 billion (2023)
- Net income: €6.308 billion (2023)
- Total assets: €64.694 billion (2023)
- Owner: Government of Germany
- Number of employees: 6,863 (2023)
- Subsidiaries: Unipro (till 2022)
- Website: www.uniper.energy

Uniper SE is a German multinational energy company based in Düsseldorf, Germany, which has been a state-owned enterprise since late 2022. It is one of the biggest energy companies by revenue in Europe. The name of the company is a portmanteau of "unique" and "performance", which was given by long-term employee Gregor Recke. Uniper was formed by the separation of E.ON's fossil fuel assets into a separate company that began operating on 1 January 2016. In 2019, the company employed about 6,800 people in over 40 countries. In 2018, around one-third of the employees were based in Germany. Until 2022, it owned a subsidiary company in Russia called Unipro. Uniper was listed on the Frankfurt Stock Exchange.

The company has faced criticism for opening new coal-fueled power plants in Germany as recently as May 2020. Uniper was one of the financiers of the Nord Stream 2 project, which the German government suspended two days before the 2022 Russian invasion of Ukraine. The company was nationalised in December 2022 as a result of the Russian invasion of Ukraine and consequent Russian termination in August 2022 of gas supply in the NordStream pipelines, following which Uniper needed to purchase gas on the spot market at a great premium and ran out of cash in this way.

== History ==
The split of the majority of E.ON's 'upstream' electricity generation business from its 'downstream' retail and distribution business was first announced in April 2015. The company became active on 1 January 2016, with 14,000 employees and is expecting an operating profit (EBITDA) of €4 billion. Arranged below Uniper SE were the Uniper Beteiligungs GmbH and the Uniper Holding GmbH, the latter functioning as holding company for the operative companies such as the Uniper Kraftwerke GmbH. The only nuclear plants in Uniper are Swedish, because German government rules aim to stop companies avoiding nuclear clean-up costs.

In June 2016, the shareholders' meetings of E.ON SE and Uniper SE decided to spin off Uniper from E.ON. It took place through a retrospective transfer of Uniper's business to 195 million new shares created by an increase in noncash capital as of January 1, 2016. It was intended to deconsolidate Uniper from E.ON in the first half of 2017. E.ON sold a 53% stake in the business through a listing on the Frankfurt Stock Exchange on 12 September 2016.

In November 2017, Uniper completed the sale of its stake in the Russian gas field Yuzhno-Russkoye. The Uniper share of 25% was sold for €1.749 billion, plus the transferred liquid funds to the Austrian OMV Group.

In September 2017, Finnish power company Fortum announced it would buy E.ON's remaining 47% stake in Uniper and make a bid for the other 53% held by other shareholders, valuing Uniper at €8 billion. A takeover bid was submitted on 7 November 2017. E.ON accepted the offer on 8 January 2018. Fortum acquired, in total, a 47.35% stake. The deal was completed on 26 June 2018, after approval by various authorities. As of August 18, 2020, Fortum held a 75.01% stake in Uniper.

On 4 July 2019, Uniper and EPH ("Energetický a průmyslový holding a.s.") signed the agreements for the sale of Uniper's activities in France. The scope of transaction includes Uniper's French sales business, two gas-fired power plants in Saint-Avold (Lorraine), two coal-fired power plants in Saint-Avold and Gardanne (Provence), the biomass power plant "Provence 4 Biomasse" in Gardanne and wind and solar power plants.

In 2025, Uniper sold its power plant in Gönyű, Hungary to Veolia.

In October 2026, Apollo made a non binding offer to privatize Uniper, which valued the company at ~$11.2 billion. Germany's finance ministry was looking to sell ~74% of its stake in the company.

=== Impact of Ukraine war ===
==== Bail out ====
Russia's war in Ukraine highlighted the dilemma that Germany faces regarding Russian assets held by German companies, and severely disrupted the company's operations. Uniper announced on 28 April 2022 that it would pay for Russian gas in rubles, in a move that the BBC described as "giving in to Russian demands and helping to undercut EU sanctions on Russia".

In July 2022, the German government and Fortum agreed to bailout Uniper a €15 billion rescue deal after being severely affected by reduced supplies and high prices following the energy standoff with Russia. Germany agreed to pay €267 million for a stake in the ownership of Uniper, while also offering the firm up to €7.7 billion in financing. Under the bailout, a record in German corporate history, the government will take a 30% stake in Uniper, reducing the ownership of Fortum to 56%.

In 2022 Uniper filed a lawsuit against Russia’s Gazprom, claiming €11.6 billion for damages following shortfalls and breach in gas supply under their long term contract.

==== Nationalisation ====
On 20 September 2022, Bloomberg News reported that the German government intended to nationalize the company, purchasing the remainder of Fortum's stake and becoming Uniper's sole owner. News of the transaction caused Uniper shares to decline and a sharp spike in Fortum's share price, resulting in a halt in trading of the latter. Finland's Minister of Ownership Steering Tytti Tuppurainen stated that Finland would not accept the nationalisation of Uniper without a level of compensation being paid. The German government's intention to nationalize the company was formalized the next day. Germany will spend $8 billion to acquire a 99% stake in the company. Uniper published a €40b loss for the first 3 quarters of 2022. The nationalisation was completed in late December 2022.

It was reported in October 2022 that Uniper was "shutting half the office space in its headquarters and lowering temperatures in areas remaining open to save gas" as it struggled to stay afloat ahead of its impending nationalisation.

==== Russian business ====
In April 2023 Russia seized the assets of Uniper Russia, including Uniper's 83.73% stake in Unipro which had already been revalued down to €1.

On 7 June 2024, an arbitration tribunal in Stockholm awarded Uniper over 13 billion euros in damages for gas not supplied by Russia's Gazprom since 2022, also allowing Uniper to terminate long-term contracts with Gazprom. The German government had nationalized Uniper in late 2022 after Russia cut gas supplies, leading Uniper to incur significant costs by purchasing gas at higher market prices.

== Operations ==
Uniper operates in the EU countries Germany, Sweden, the Netherlands, Belgium. Outside of the EU it operates in the United Kingdom, and has offices in the United States, Azerbaijan, Singapore, and the United Arab Emirates. The company used to operate in Russia until 2022 and in Hungary until 2025. In addition to the fossil fuel power generation assets it owns hydropower and nuclear power assets in Sweden. Together, Fortum and Uniper are running the Oskarshamn nuclear power plant and are both involved in the Forsmark nuclear power plant. Both operate hydropower plants in Sweden.

With 34 GW generating capacities, Uniper is one of the largest European electricity producers. Uniper Global Commodities SE trades on the spot and futures market for gas, coal, freight, oil, liquefied natural gas and emission rights on different stock markets and on the over-the-counter-market. Uniper Energy Storage GmbH is responsible for gas storage activities in Europe. The Power-to-Gas plants WindGas Falkenhagen and WindGas Hamburg store renewable energy in the form of electricity, gas or heat. Through electrolyzing, the gained wind energy is transformed into hydrogen and fed into the local gas network. The Uniper Energy Storage GmbH operates gas storages with a capacity of 9 billion cubic metres (3.2×10^{11} cubic feet) in Germany, Austria, and the United Kingdom.

List of power stations of Uniper outside Germany (for power stations in Germany see de:Uniper Kraftwerke):

Location	Energy source	Power	Notes
Connah's Quay	Natural gas	1380 MW	
Cottam	Natural gas	395 MW	
Isle of Grain	Natural gas	1275 MW	
Enfield	Natural gas	408 MW	
Killingholme	Natural gas	600 MW	
Taylors Lane (Willesden)	Oil	132 MW	
Ratcliffe-on-Soar Power Station	Coal	2000 MW	Decommissioned
Nuclear power plant Oskarshamn	Nuclear energy	2308 MW	54.4% share
Nuclear power plant Ringhals	Nuclear energy	3820 MW	29.6% share
Nuclear power plant Forsmark	Nuclear energy	3157 MW	8.5% share
Maasvlakte	Coal	2180 MW	
Rotterdam	Natural gas	269 MW	
Den Haag	Natural gas	112 MW	
Leiden	Natural gas	83 MW	
Maasvlakte	Natural gas	78 MW	
Vilvoorde	Natural gas	265 MW	

In addition, Uniper owns more than 70 hydropower plants with a capacity of 1,553 MW in Sweden.

According to the 2017 Sustainability Report, the power production (totalling 120.8 TWh in 2017) by primary energy source was:

	TWh	
energy source	2017	2016
Gas/Oil	61.9	73
Hard coal	24.3	31.2
Nuclear	11.1	13.6
Hydro	11.8	11
Lignite	11.5	9.7
Renewables	0.2	0.2

== Corporate affairs ==
The supervisory board consist of twelve members. Six members have been appointed by the general meeting, six by the employees through an election set up by Uniper SE. The shareholder representatives are Markus Rauramo (Chairman), Dr. Bernhard Günther (Deputy Chairman), Prof. Dr. Werner Brinker, Judith Buss, Esa Hyvärinen and Nora Steiner-Forsberg. The employee representatives in 2022 were Harald Seegatz (deputy chairman), Holger Grzella, Diana Kirschner, Victoria Kulambi, Magnus Notini and Immo Schlepper.

In January 2023 Uniper announced that Klaus-Dieter Maubach used his right of cancellation and would quit as CEO in March that year. Additionally COO David Bryson and CFO Tiina Tuomela made their resignations public. On 1 March 2023 Michael Lewis, former CEO of E.ON UK, was appointed as new Uniper CEO. Lewis starts as CEO on 1 July 2023. Jutta Dönges became new CFO and Holger Kreetz followed Bryson as COO.

=== Finances ===
The key trends for Uniper are, as of each financial year:

Year	2017	2018	2019	2020	2021	2022	2023
Total revenue (€ mn.)	72,238	78,176	65,804	50,968	163,979	274,121	107,915
Net profit (€ mn.)	−656	−452	610	397	−4,169	−18,979	6,308
Total Assets (€ mn.)	48,302	57,675	49,424	44,637	157,478	146,489	64,694
Number of employees	12,180	11,780	11,532	11,751	11,494	7,008	6,863
