= Limeux transmitting station =

Telecommunications transmission site near Abbeville, France
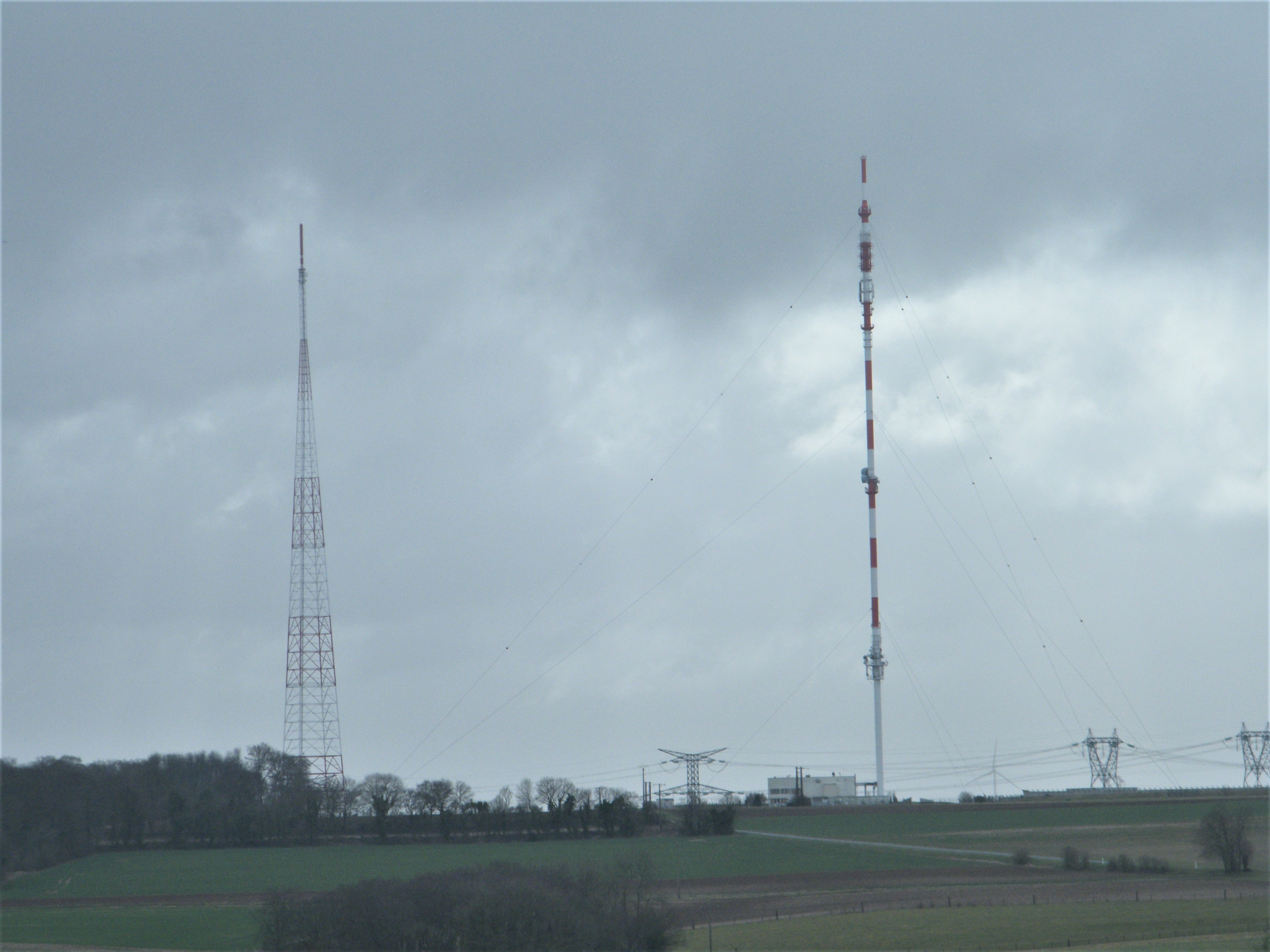
- Interactive map of the Telecommunications transmission site near Abbeville, France area

General information
- Status: Completed
- Type: TV Radio and mobile Phone transmitter
- Location: Limeux, Picardie, France
- Coordinates: 50°00′44″N 1°49′49″E 50°00′44″N 1°50′01″E
- Completed: mast 1: end 1960's / mast 2 : january 2016

Height
- Height: mast 1 : 203 m (666 ft) / mast 2 : 202 m (663 ft)

Design and construction
- Main contractor: TDF

The Limeux transmitting station (50°00′44″N 1°49′49″E) (mast 1) and (50°00′44″N 1°50′01″E) (mast 2) is a facility for FM radio and television and mobile phone transmissions located near Abbeville, Somme, France. It has a 203-metre (666 ft) tall guyed mast for FM radio and analogue and digital television services. It is the tallest built structure in the Somme.

== The building of a second Mast ==
As in most countries, TV Broadcast was a state monopoly in France. As a consequence, when the market opened to competitors, the historic operator TDF had the advantage of already having all the requested infrastructures. By Law, it was decided to permit access of the existing infrastructures to the competitors, paying a rent to the historic operator. The Operator Itas Tim found it more profitable to build its own mast and not paying the rent, thus a second mast was built at the end of 2015. Itas tim switched over its own muxes to the new mast on February, 2nd 2016. But in the end TDF bought the operator Itas Tim at the end 2016.

== Analogue services (Mast 1) ==
FM radio
Radio name	Frequency	Power
France Info	89.8 MHz	2,5 kW
France Inter	93.1 MHz	2,5 kW
France Culture	97.4 MHz	2,5 kW
France Bleu Picardie	100.6 MHz	5 kW

Digital switchover planned date on Abbeville-Limeux TV mast : February 1, 2011.

Analogue TV SECAM with NICAM Subcarrier
Channel Name	UHF Channel	Power	Notes
TF1	63H	380 kW	
France 2	57H	380 kW	will be used for digital broadcasting when DSO completed
France 3 Picardie	60H	380 kW	
Canal+	not transmitted	N/A	This Pay TV was received from Bouvigny TV mast (in analogue) (Switched off on 14/04/10). It is now only available using DTT on Limeux
France 5/Arte	45H	80 kW	
M6	42H	80 kW	

== Digital services ==
Originally transmitted via Transmitter 1, some multiplexes were later moved to a competitor's Transmitter 2. Following the takeover of Itas Tim by TDF, Transmitter 2 was physically dismantled and scrapped due to redundancy with Transmitter 1. Extra compression made it possible to delete mux 5 and then to sell the frequencies over 700 MHz to mobile phone operators.

Following the strategic decision by Canal+ - France's leading pay TV operator - to cease broadcasting its premium channels via Digital Terrestrial Television (DTT), multiplex R3 was officially decommissioned on June 6, 2025.

As a result of this change, R3 effectively hosted only two channels: the news channel LCI and the general entertainment channel Paris Première. As part of the restructuring process, Paris Première was migrated to multiplex R4 with a resolution adjustment (from 1920x1080 to 1440x1080), while LCI was relocated to multiplex R6.

Télévision Numérique Terrestre the French version of Freeview (UK)
Multiplex Name	UHF Channel	Nominal power	Transmitting standard	HD / UHD Resolution	Operator
Multiplex R1 (GR1)	35H	80 kW	DVB-T	HD	TDF
Multiplex R2 (NTN)	31H	80 kW	DVB-T	HD	Towercast
Multiplex R4 (Multi4)	47H	80 kW	DVB-T	HD	Towercast
Multiplex R6 (SMR6)	44H	80 kW	DVB-T	HD	Towercast
Multiplex R7 (MHD7)	37H	80 kW	DVB-T	HD	Towercast
Multiplex R9 (CNH)	33H	2 kW	DVB-T2	UHD	ITAS TIM
