= Parcelforce =

Courier and logistics service in the United Kingdom

Parcelforce Worldwide
- Company type: Trading name
- Industry: Postal Service
- Founded: 1990
- Headquarters: Milton Keynes, England, UK
- Key people: Aaron Barnes (Managing Director)
- Number of employees: 6,500
- Parent: Royal Mail
- Website: parcelforce.com

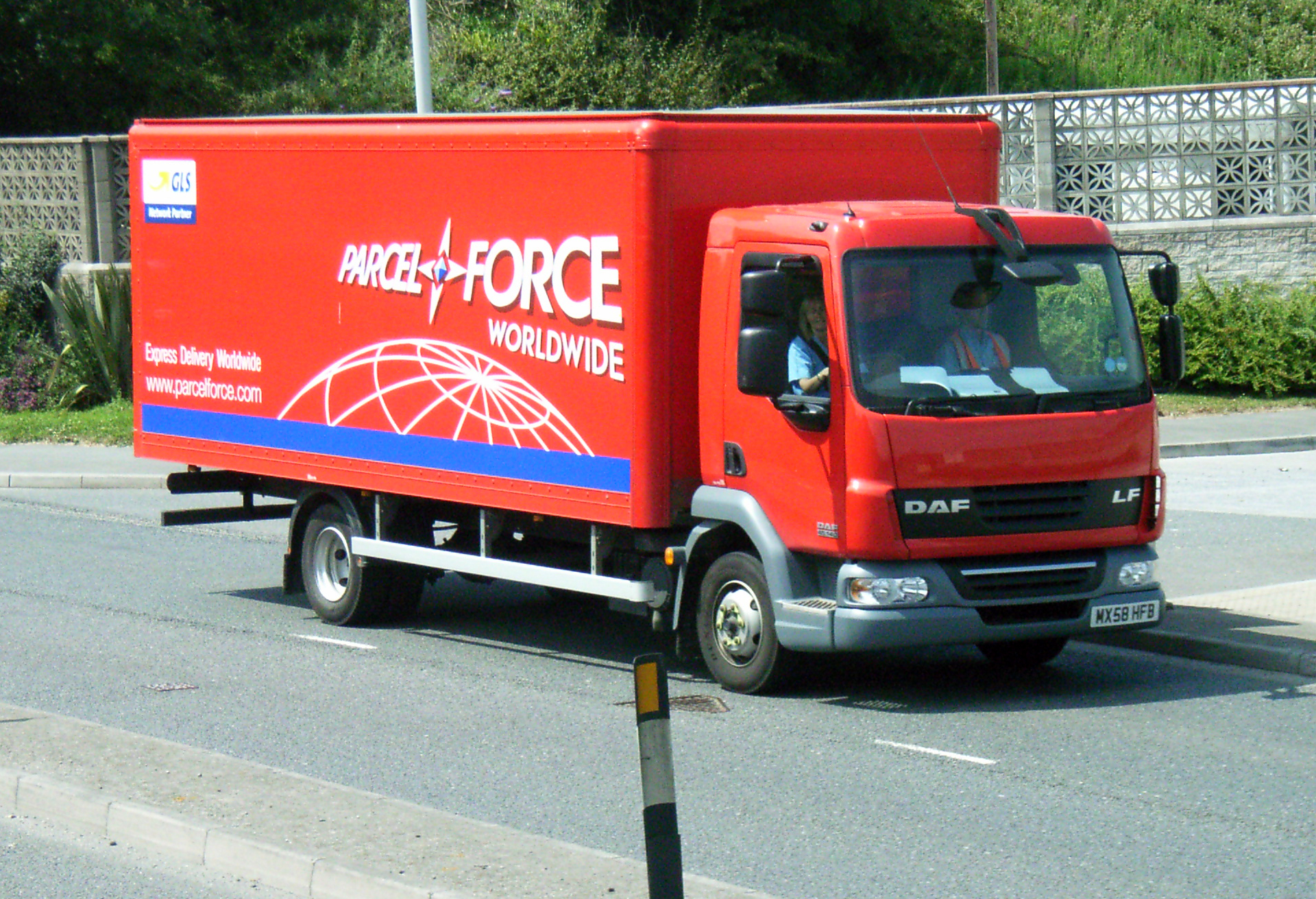
A Parcelforce delivery vehicle in 2009

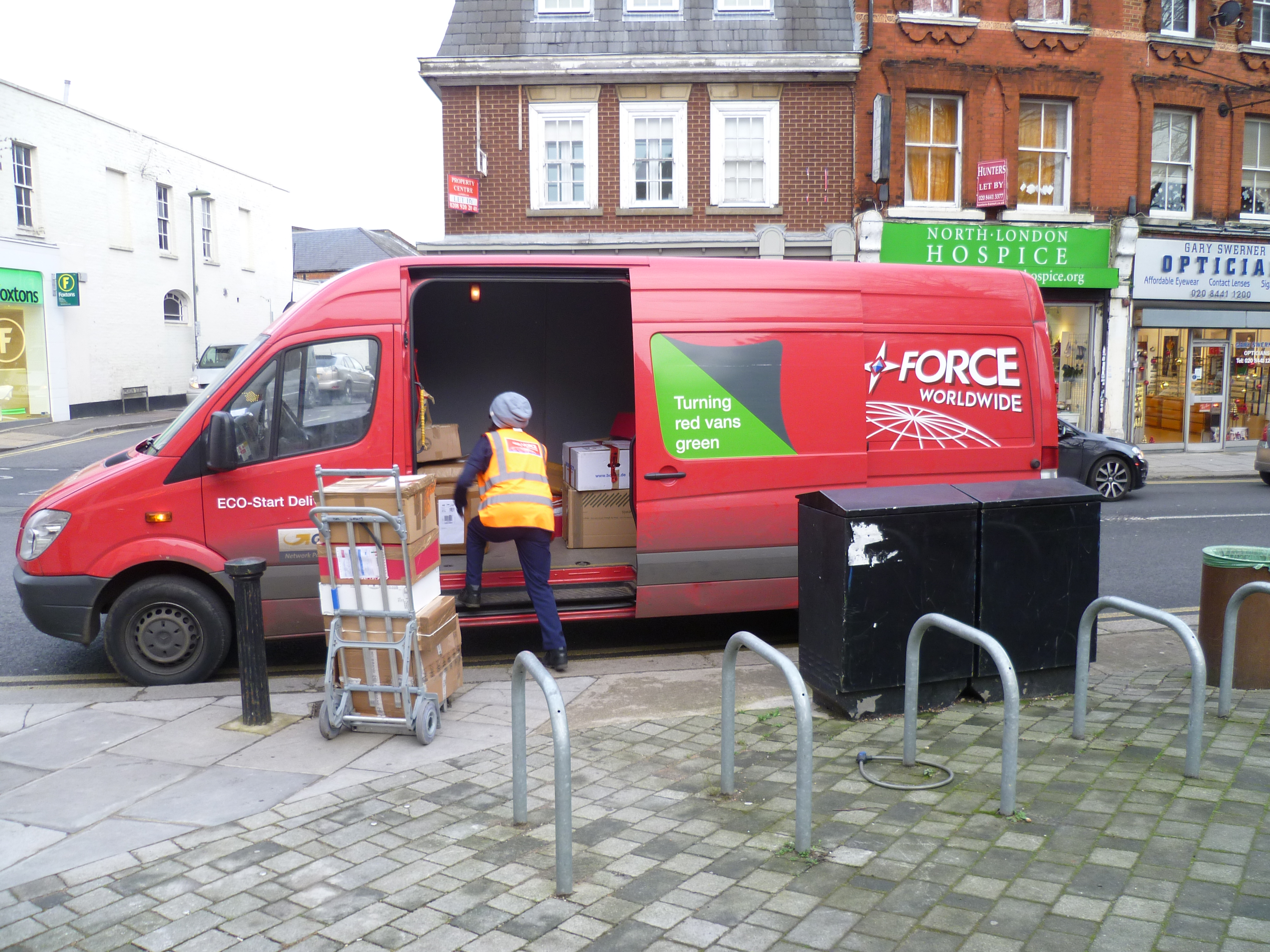
Loading a Parcelforce van in Chipping Barnet, 2015

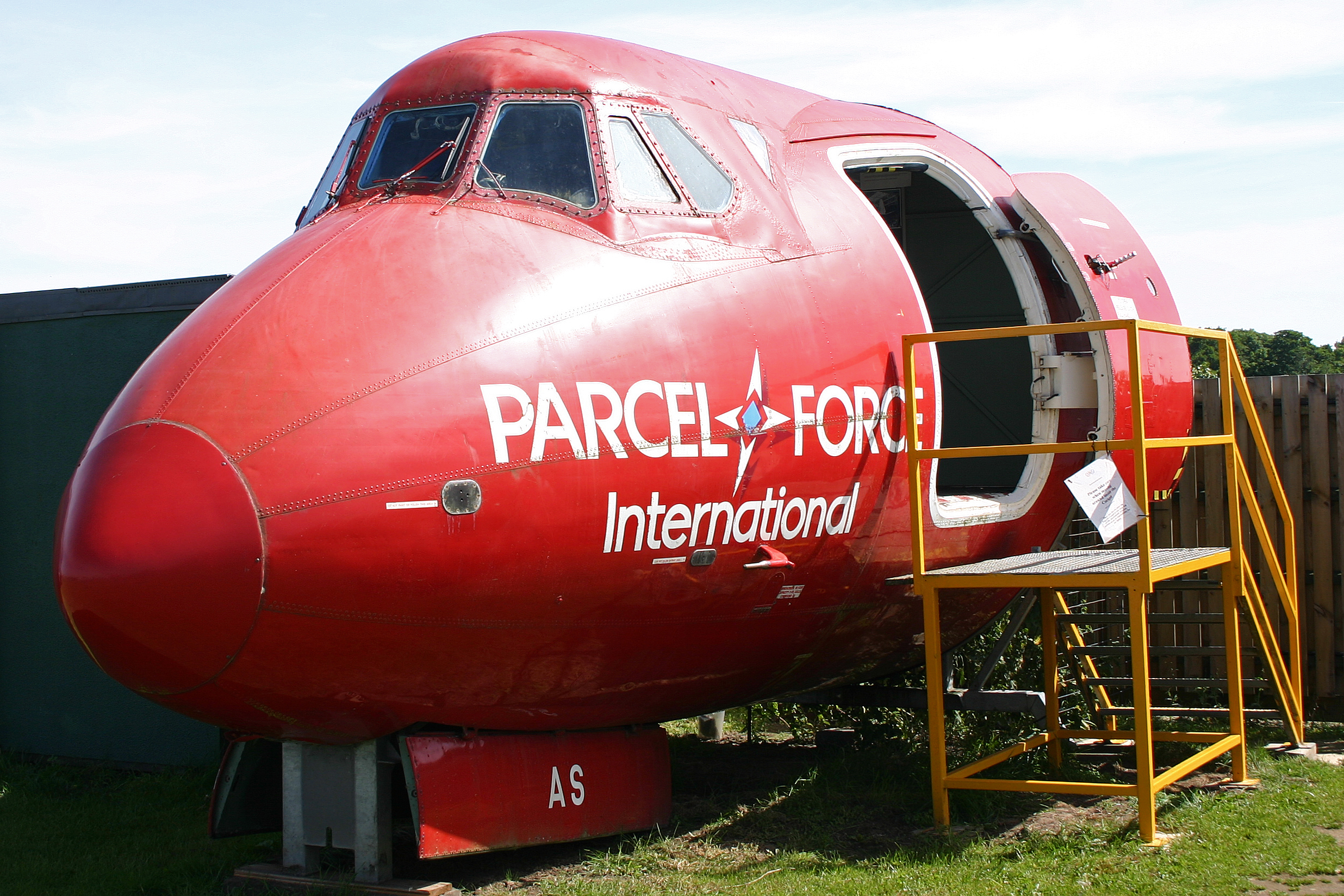
Nose of a Vickers Viscount 806 G-OPAS formerly used for Parcelforce International

Parcelforce Worldwide is a courier and logistics service in the United Kingdom. Parcelforce Worldwide is a trading name of Royal Mail, which is a subsidiary of International Distribution Services, and is organised within the UK Parcels, International and Letters division of the group. The company delivers to destinations worldwide, using an international partner network. Parcelforce Worldwide is a provider of express delivery services covering 99.6% of the world's population, with over 6,500 employees.

Its European delivery partner, General Logistics Systems (GLS), is also a subsidiary of International Distribution Services and delivers more than one million parcels a day across 34 countries in Europe. Parcelforce Worldwide is a direct competitor of other worldwide delivery brands, such as DHL, DX Group, FedEx and UPS.

Parcelforce Limited operates a "hub and spoke" collection and delivery system with two hubs in the West Midlands, south of Coventry. One hub is for parcels for the United Kingdom, and the other for international parcels. The hub for the United Kingdom, one of the country's largest buildings, is a highly automated tracking and sorting centre covering 24,000 square metres (5.9 acres) and can handle up to 58,500 parcels an hour.

== History ==
The Parcel Post service of Royal Mail was started in 1883, though parcel services operated by the railway companies, later Red Star Parcels and British Road Services, were also heavily used for many decades. Royal Mail was split into three divisions in 1986 and in March 1990, Royal Mail Parcels was rebranded as Parcelforce.

In July 1992, the Secretary of State for Trade and Industry, Michael Heseltine, proposed a privatisation of the Parcelforce business. He argued that the company provided most of its services to businesses rather than individuals, and that the competitive market it operated in meant there was no need for it to remain a publicly owned company.

In March 2002, the universal parcels service was transferred to Royal Mail, leaving Parcelforce to concentrate on time-guaranteed, next-day and two-day express deliveries.

In January 2007, Parcelforce Worldwide became the first express carrier in the United Kingdom to give its customers the option to offset the carbon emissions associated with the delivery of their parcels. The company allowed customers to donate 5p for a delivery for the United Kingdom, or 10p for an international delivery to the Woodland Trust. Parcelforce would then match the donation.

In October 2012, Royal Mail announced an investment of £75 million in Parcelforce Worldwide planned over four years, which would involve the opening of new processing centres in Chorley, Lancashire and depots in Basingstoke, Hampshire and Bodmin, Cornwall.

In September 2021, Aaron Barnes took over as managing director of Parcelforce Worldwide.

== Depot network ==
Parcelforce Worldwide operates its collection and delivery services via a network of 54 local depots.
