= Ilek =

Ilek (Russian: Илек) is the name of several places:

- Ilek (river), a tributary of the Ural in Russia and Kazakhstan
- Ilek, Chelyabinsk Oblast, a selo in Ileksky Selsoviet of Ashinsky District of Chelyabinsk Oblast, Russia
- Ilek, Kursk Oblast, a selo in Ilkovsky Selsoviet of Belovsky District of Kursk Oblast, Russia
- Ilek, Orenburg Oblast, a selo in Ileksky Selsoviet of Ileksky District of Orenburg Oblast, Russia
