= Daniel Křetínský =

Czech businessman and lawyer (born 1975)

- Born: 9 July 1975 (age 51); Brno, Czechoslovakia
- Education: Masaryk University
- Occupations: Businessman and investor
- Title: Chairman and CEO, EP Group; Chairman, EPH; Chairman, Sparta Prague; Joint-chair, West Ham United
- Partners: Anna Kellnerová (2017–2023); Marie Jedličková (2025–present)

Daniel Křetínský (Czech: [ˈdanɪjɛl ˈkr̝ɛciːnskiː]; born 9 July 1975) is a Czech billionaire businessman and lawyer. He is chairman and controlling shareholder of EP Group, a European conglomerate built around the energy company Energetický a průmyslový holding (EPH). The group owns energy and infrastructure businesses across Europe and controls International Distribution Services, Groupe Casino and Metro AG.

Křetínský also has investments in retail, postal services and publishing, including significant holdings in Sainsbury's, PostNL and publishing group Editis. In football, he is chairman and co-owner of AC Sparta Prague and joint-chair and indirect 46% owner of West Ham United.

== Early life ==
His biological father is Mojmír Křetínský, computer science professor at Masaryk University, and his mother, Michaela Židlická, is a former justice of the Constitutional Court of the Czech Republic. His stepfather, who raised him, is photographer Vladimír Židlický.

== Career ==
=== Early career ===
In 1999, Křetínský joined J&T as lawyer and became a partner in 2003. Since 2004, he has been the chairman of football club Sparta Prague and he is believed to be its 40% shareholder.

When J&T founded Energetický a průmyslový holding in 2009, he became its chairman and 20% shareholder. He ceased to be a partner of J&T. In 2011, he became chairman and 60% shareholder of EP Industries, that was divested from EPH. In 2016, he took 94% ownership of EPH through a series of transactions including EPH's sale of a 30% stake in subsidiary EPIF where the proceeds were used to buy out other shareholders. As of 2022, EPIF owned 49% of Eustream, a Slovak gas transmission system operator which piped Russian gas to central and eastern Europe.

Since 2014, he has been one of the owners of Czech media house Czech News Center which published the tabloid Blesk.

=== 2018–2020: Expansion into media and retail ===
In October 2018, Křetínský acquired 49% of Matthieu Pigasse's stake in the French newspaper Le Monde. The transaction had not been disclosed beforehand to the newspaper's journalists or its minority shareholder group representing staff and readers. In September 2019, more than 450 journalists signed an open letter asking Pigasse and Křetínský to accept an agreement giving the group approval rights over any future controlling shareholder.

In March 2020, Jérôme Lefilliâtre, a journalist at Libération, published Mister K: Petites et grandes affaires de Daniel Kretinsky, an investigative account of Křetínský's business career and media investments.

In September 2020, Křetínský's investment company VESA Equity Investment acquired a 3.05% interest in the British supermarket group Sainsbury's. By November, VESA had increased its interest in Foot Locker to approximately 10.3%, making it the footwear retailer's largest shareholder.

=== 2021–2023: Football and postal investments ===
On 10 November 2021, 1890s Holdings, an investment company ultimately owned by Křetínský, acquired a 27% stake in English football club West Ham United. Křetínský and Pavel Horský joined the club's board as part of the transaction.

In August 2022, the UK government called in Vesa Equity Investment's proposed increase of its stake in Royal Mail plc, later renamed International Distribution Services (IDS), to more than 25% for assessment under the National Security and Investment Act 2021. Vesa was already the company's largest shareholder. On 31 October, the government concluded its assessment and announced that it would take no further action over the proposed acquisition. Vesa subsequently increased its holding to 25.02% by May 2023.

=== 2024–present ===
Between 2024 and 2026, Křetínský expanded EP Group's interests in logistics, retail and energy. In May 2024, International Distribution Services (IDS), the parent company of Royal Mail and GLS, accepted a takeover offer from EP Group worth approximately £3.6 billion. The British government approved the acquisition after securing commitments concerning Royal Mail's services, workforce and continued presence in the United Kingdom, as well as a "golden share" protecting its headquarters and tax residence. EP Group gained control of IDS in April 2025, and the company was delisted from the London Stock Exchange in June.

A consortium led by Křetínský also took control of French retailer Groupe Casino in March 2024 following its financial restructuring. EP Group held 20% of Thyssenkrupp Steel Europe from July 2024 until September 2025, when negotiations over a proposed joint venture ended. In 2025, Metro AG was delisted under an agreement with Křetínský-controlled EP Global Commerce, while EPH gained control of a 66% interest in Slovenské elektrárne. In April 2026, EPH formed the jointly owned power-generation company TTEP with TotalEnergies, receiving approximately 4.2% of TotalEnergies as part of the transaction.

== Personal life ==
Křetínský dated champion Showjumper, Anna Kellnerová, between 2017, and 2023. She is the daughter of his former business associate, Petr Kellner, who was once listed as the richest man in the Czech Republic.

In 2018, Le Monde reported that Křetínský had acquired in 2015, through an offshore company that he controls, the Grade II listed mansion in, Hampstead known as Heath Hall, for around £20 million (€23m). The property features, 15 bedrooms, 13 bathrooms, a cinema, and a tennis court. The French daily newspaper obtained the information from the leaked Panama Papers.
