= Gardanne =

Commune in Provence-Alpes-Côte d'Azur, France

Gardanne Gardana (Occitan)
- Commune
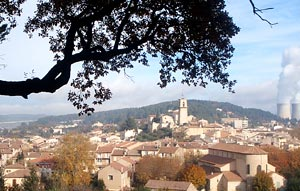
- View of Gardanne

- Coat of arms
- Location of Gardanne
- Location within France Location within Provence-Alpes-Côte d'Azur
- Coordinates: 43°27′19″N 5°28′34″E
- Country: France
- Region: Provence-Alpes-Côte d'Azur
- Department: Bouches-du-Rhône
- Arrondissement: Aix-en-Provence
- Canton: Gardanne
- Intercommunality: Aix-Marseille-Provence

Government
  - Mayor (2026–32): Hervé Granier
- Area^{1}: 27.02 km^{2} (10.43 sq mi)
- Elevation: 205 m (673 ft)
- Highest elevation: 387 m (1,270 ft)
- Lowest elevation: 170 m (560 ft)
- Population (2023): 21,597
  - Density: 799.3/km^{2} (2,070/sq mi)
- Time zone: UTC+01:00 (CET)
  - Summer (DST): UTC+02:00 (CEST)
- INSEE/Postal code: 13041 /13120
- ^{1} French Land Register data, which excludes lakes, ponds, glaciers > 1 km^{2} (0.386 sq mi or 247 acres) and river estuaries.

Gardanne (French pronunciation: [ɡaʁdan]; Occitan: Gardana) is a commune in the Bouches-du-Rhône department in southern France. Its inhabitants are called Gardannais.

== Geography ==
Situated close to Aix-en-Provence and Marseille and on the rail link connecting the two cities, Gardanne is bordered by the Massif du Montaiguet. The terrain is moderately elevated, with some areas reaching over 200 meters (656 feet) above sea level. The surrounding countryside includes forests, vineyards, and former mining sites from the town's historical coal-mining industry. The Arc River flows nearby, contributing to the region's drainage and agricultural viability. Following devastating bush fires in 1979 and 2005, garrigue now covers a wide area of the region.

== History ==
The Hôtel de Ville

The history of Gardanne dates back to 4000 BC, with the discovery of a Neolithic site in 2003. Walls dating back to the first century AD have also been found.

Throughout the Middle Ages the town was enclosed within ramparts and the lordship of Gardanne belonged to different noble families. From the 13th century, the inhabitants claimed franchises and freedoms through their municipal magistrates. In 1454 René d'Anjou bought the estate and would go there until 1480. In 1482 it was bought back by the Forbins and in 1676 the villagers themselves bought back their own land.

In the 1860s a railway was built and mines were dug, attracting Italian, Armenian, Polish, Czech, Spanish and African workers to the village. The deep mine, one of the last surviving in France, was closed down in 2003. During this time frame, The population grew rapidly, from 1,600 inhabitants in 1809, to 20,000 in 1999) until the mine ceased operations in 2003.

In 1886, French painter Paul Cézanne settled in Gardanne with his family, and that year, he began his cycle of paintings on Mount Sainte-Victoire.

The Hôtel de Ville was completed in 1907.

== Energy ==
The Centrale thermique de Provence, a thermal power station is located in Gardanne. It runs on coal and biomass and uses the technology known as the circulating fluidized bed. It has the highest chimney in France which rises to 297 m. In 2018, the site director presented it as the third tallest building in France, after the Eiffel Tower and the Millau viaduct. The plant will be closed before 2022 in order to reduce greenhouse gas (CO_{2}) emissions in accordance with the PPE law.

Gallery

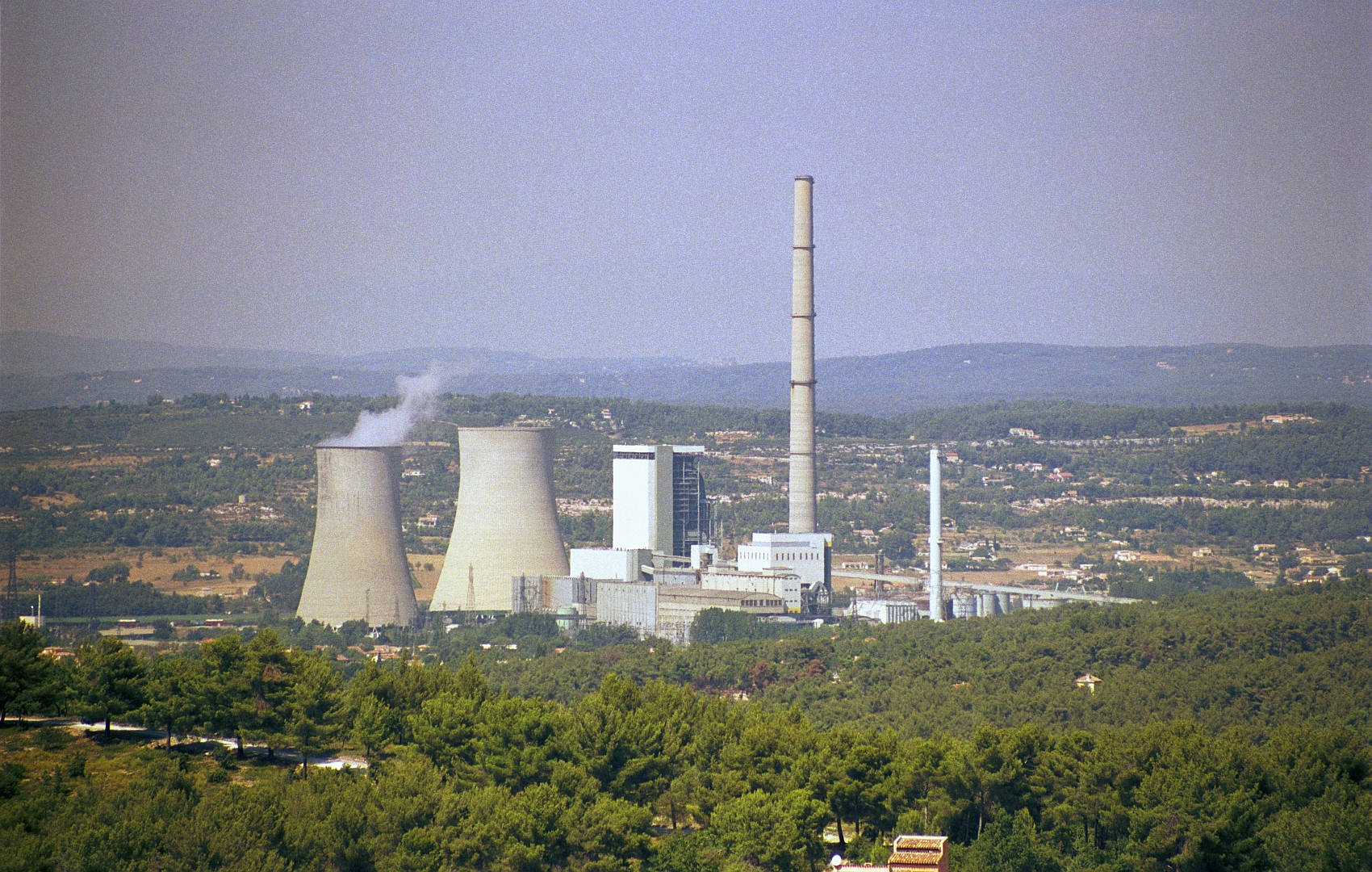
Gardanne power station seen from Mimet

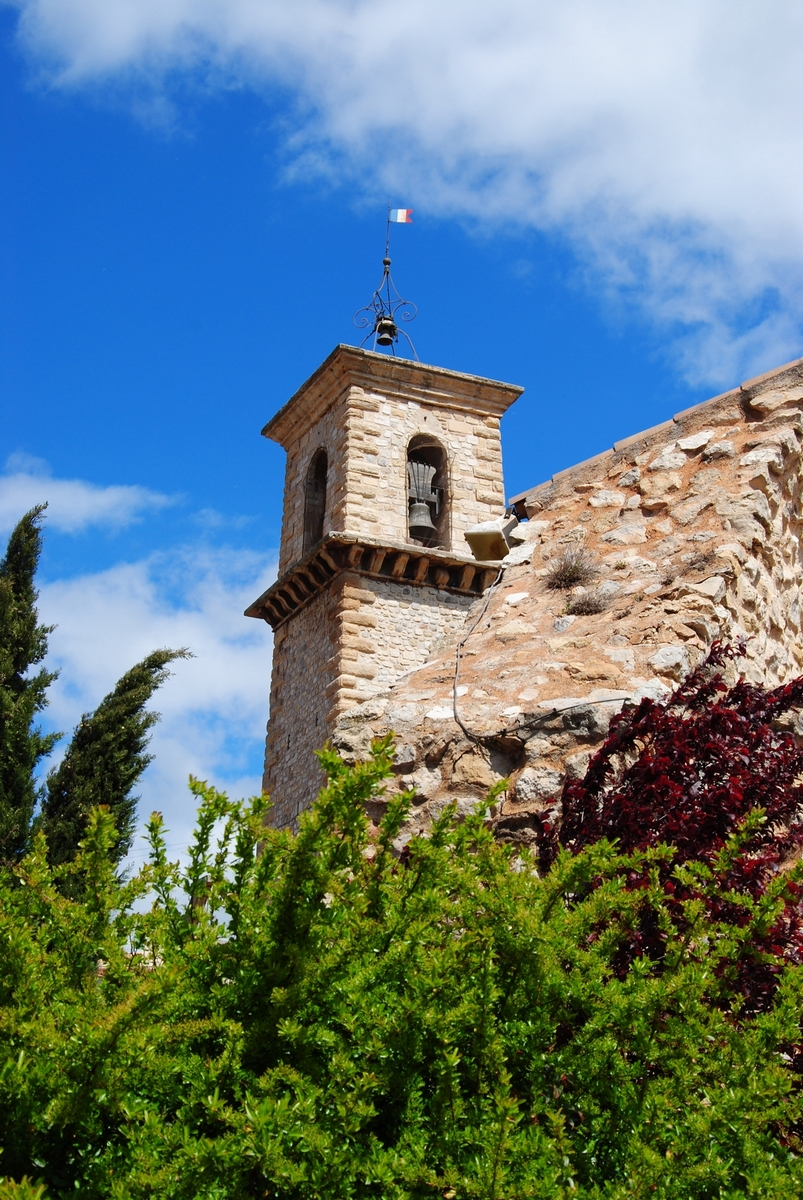
Clocher of Gardanne

== Population ==
Historical population

Year	Pop.	±% p.a.
1793	2,253	—
1800	2,353	+0.62%
1806	2,428	+0.52%
1821	2,823	+1.01%
1831	3,234	+1.37%
1836	2,795	−2.88%
1841	2,609	−1.37%
1846	2,869	+1.92%
1851	2,837	−0.22%
1856	2,710	−0.91%
1861	2,739	+0.21%
1866	2,570	−1.27%
1872	2,566	−0.03%
1876	3,062	+4.52%
1881	2,781	−1.91%
1886	2,657	−0.91%
1891	2,797	+1.03%
1896	3,062	+1.83%
1901	3,593	+3.25%

Year	Pop.	±% p.a.
1906	4,062	+2.48%
1911	4,242	+0.87%
1921	5,301	+2.25%
1926	6,460	+4.03%
1931	7,128	+1.99%
1936	7,334	+0.57%
1946	7,979	+0.85%
1954	8,973	+1.48%
1962	11,261	+2.88%
1968	12,601	+1.89%
1975	14,120	+1.64%
1982	15,122	+0.98%
1990	17,864	+2.10%
1999	19,323	+0.88%
2007	20,903	+0.99%
2012	20,616	−0.28%
2017	20,794	+0.17%
2023	21,597	+0.63%

Source: EHESS and INSEE (1968-2023)

== Politics ==
The commune of Gardanne was governed by the French Communist Party under Mayor Roger Meï from 1977 until 2020. Voters tend towards the left, but rather uncharacteristically, Nicolas Sarkozy gained 53.1% of the vote at the second round of the 2007 French presidential election.

List of mayors
Term	Name	Party
1977–2020	Roger Meï	PCF
2020–incumbent	Hervé Granier	LR

== See also ==
- Provence Power Station
- Communes of the Bouches-du-Rhône department
- Olivier Dubuquoy
