= GLS Group =

European logistics company

General Logistics Systems B.V.
- Industry: Parcel delivery
- Founded: 1999
- Headquarters: Amsterdam, Netherlands
- Key people: Karl Pfaff (CEO)
- Revenue: €6 billion (2025–26)
- Operating income: £69 million (2025–26)
- Number of employees: About 24,000 (2026)
- Parent: International Distribution Services
- Website: gls-group.com

GLS Group (General Logistics Systems B.V.) is a parcel delivery company headquartered in Amsterdam. It delivers parcels in Europe and North America. Together with its partners, it serves more than 50 countries.

The company was formed in 1999 after the British Post Office acquired German Parcel. It is a subsidiary of International Distribution Services (IDS), which came under the control of EP Group in 2025.

== History ==
German Parcel was founded in 1989 by 25 freight forwarders in Neuenstein, Germany. Rico Back was a founding member and the company's first managing director. The British Post Office acquired German Parcel in January 1999. That autumn, German Parcel became part of the newly formed General Logistics Systems (GLS).

The British Post Office’s operations passed to the state-owned Consignia group in 2001. Consignia plc changed its name to Royal Mail Group plc in November 2002. In October 2002, the group brought its European parcel businesses under the GLS name.

GLS expanded its European network by acquiring and setting up local parcel companies. It began operating in Spain in 2005. By 2008, GLS and its partners delivered parcels in 36 European countries. In October 2016, GLS entered the North American market by acquiring Golden State Overnight (GSO), a California-based parcel carrier. It was renamed GLS-US in December 2019.

GLS entered the Canadian market in September 2018 by acquiring Dicom Canada. In December 2021, it extended its network into western Canada by acquiring Mid-Nite Sun Transportation Ltd, a freight carrier operating as Rosenau Transport. In 2022, Royal Mail plc, the parent company of GLS and Royal Mail Group Ltd, changed its name to International Distribution Services plc (IDS). In 2025, EP Group acquired control of IDS.

== Operations ==
GLS Group operates a ground‑based parcel network across Europe and North America, providing delivery solutions for business and consumer customers. Industry profiles describe GLS as one of the larger European parcel carriers, with operations in around 50 countries and a network of more than 120 hubs and 1,600 depots handling hundreds of millions of parcels per year.

=== Parcel and ground ===
GLS’s core business consists of deferred parcel and ground services for B2B and B2C shippers, typically focused on parcels up to around 30 kg. Carrier overviews note that GLS positions itself as a road‑based parcel network, with regular services connecting national networks and partner companies across its European core markets and North American operations.

=== Express ===
In addition to standard ground products, GLS offers various express and time‑definite services in several of its markets. Trade and industry coverage describes GLS as providing next‑day or expedited delivery options on selected routes, positioning these as a complement to its core deferred parcel services.

=== Freight ===
While GLS is primarily a parcel carrier, some national operations also provide additional logistics and freight‑related services. North American materials, for example, refer to GLS offering both parcel and less‑than‑truckload (LTL) services as part of its regional strategy.

=== Cross‑border and international ===
GLS operates cross‑border services linking its European network with operations in the United States and Canada, supporting e‑commerce and business shipments between these regions. Parcel and postal industry media report that GLS has integrated GLS US services with its European network, enabling direct parcel flows between the USA and about 50 European countries with standardised tracking and delivery options.

=== Out‑of‑home network and digital ===
GLS supports home delivery with a network of out‑of‑home options, including parcel shops and parcel lockers. Industry and partner announcements describe how GLS has expanded its locker and pick‑up network in several countries to accommodate growing e‑commerce volumes and demand for flexible delivery.

== Criticism ==
In 2010 the parcel service was 'passed' a review by the German Consumers' Organization. The handling and wrong parcel pick-ups were criticized. The review was repeated in 2014 with similar results. In November 2019 the German magazine Stern published statistics with a 'shock indicator/goods damaged' value of 44,4%.

In mid-September 2016, hundreds of parcel delivery workers took strike action in the Italian cities of Bergamo, Brescia, Piacenza, Bologna and Parma against GLS and its subcontractors to protest against poor working conditions. On the night of 14–15 September 2016, a van broke through a picket line formed by workers in front of the plant operated by GLS subcontractor SEAM in Piacenza. The van struck and killed Egyptian worker Abd Elsalam Ahmed Eldanf. It was reported that eyewitnesses heard the plant's Chief of Staff ordering the driver to break through the picket line. The Piacenza Prosecutor's office concluded that no strike or protest was taking place at that moment and therefore ruled the death was a car accident. The driver was subsequently released, prompting 7,000 workers to take to the streets in Piacenza and at other GLS offices in Italy, as well as from other firms.

== External sources ==
Media related to General Logistics Systems at Wikimedia Commons

- Official website
