= PeaceWomen Across the Globe =

Organization based in Bern, Switzerland

PeaceWomen Across the Globe (PWAG), previously known as 1000 PeaceWomen, is an organization based in Bern, Switzerland that aims to increase the visibility of women promoting peace all over the world.

== History ==
The organization began in 2003 under the direction of Ruth-Gaby Vermont-Mangold, then a member of the Swiss National Council, as an initiative to nominate 1000 women from over 150 countries for the 2005 Nobel Peace Prize. The nomination was notable for including not only celebrities, but also relatively unknown women who have made significant contributions to world peace. Although the prize was ultimately awarded to the International Atomic Energy Agency, the initiative was successful in drawing public attention to the role of women in peacemaking. The organization went on to publish a book, and create an exhibition that was first displayed in Zurich, Switzerland, and has since appeared in over 25 countries, including places such as Xavier University in Cincinnati, Ohio; Lingnan University in Hong Kong, China; and at a UNESCO-sponsored exhibition in Geneva, Switzerland.

Since 2006, PeaceWomen Across the Globe has been one of the NGO members of the Swiss Center for Peacebuilding, which contributes to Swiss foreign policy. The organization is also a member of the Global Network of Women Peacebuilders.

== Members ==
Members of PWAG include:

- Sakena Yacoobi, executive director of the Afghan Institute for Learning
- Amina Afzali, member of the Afghan Cabinet of Ministers
- Malalai Joya, Afghan politician
- Jelka Glumičić, Croatian activist
- Cynthia Basinet, American actress, singer
- Runa Banerjee, Indian social worker and founder of Self Employed Women's Association (SEWA), Lucknow
- Keepu Tsering Lepcha, Indian social worker and founder of Human Development Foundation of Sikkim (HDFS), Sikkim
- Sevim Arbana, Albanian women's rights activist.

== The 1000 PeaceWomen ==
Country of origins	Nominees
Afghanistan	Amina Afzali; Amma Sakinah; Benazir Hotaki; Halima Khazan; Lawangina Khan; Malalai Joya; Palwasha Hassan; Sakena Yacoobi; Sayed Naqi; Shereen Maira Sazawar; Suraya Parlika
Albania	Sevim Arbana
Algeria	Louisa Hanoune; Zazi Sadou
Angola	Eunice Nangueve Inácio; Maria de Jesus Haller
Argentina	María del Carmen Sarthes; Martha Pelloni; Mirta Susana Clara; Olga del Valle Márquez de Arédez; Silvia Vera Ocampo
Armenia	Jemma Hasratyan; Susanna Vardanyan
Australia	Alexandra Gater; Faith Bandler; Jo Vallentine; Kupa Piti Kungka Tjuta; Stella Cornelius; Zohl de Ishtar
Austria	Barbara Nath-Wiser; Hildegard Goss-Mayr; Irma Schwager; Marion Thuswald; Ute Bock
Azerbaijan	Elmira Süleymanova
Bahrain	Sheikha Lulwa Al-Khalifa
Bangladesh	Angela Gomes; Asha Lata Baidya; Beggzadi Mahmuda Nasir; Ebadon Bibi; Hena Das; Khushi Kabir; Masuda Banu Ratna; Mohua Paul; Monowara Begum Monu; Nanda Rani Das; Rafiza Begum; Rahela Khatun; Rokeya Kabir; Sandhya Roy; Shirin Banu Mitil; Sufia Khatun
Barbados	Hazel Magdalene King
Belarus	Galina Drebezova; Irina Grushevaya
Belgium	Jeanne Devos
Benin	Grace Aboh; Grace d'Almeida
Bolivia	Ana María Romero; Domitila Chúngara; Nicolasa Machaca
Bosnia and Herzegovina	Alma Suljević; Azra Hasanbegović; Hatidža Mehmedović; Marijana Senjak; Nadja Mehmedbasić; Nusreta Sivac; Snježana Mulić-Bušatlija
Botswana	Lydia Nyati-Ramahobo
Brazil	Albertina Duarte Takiuti; Alzira Rufino; Ana Maria Machado; Ana Montenegro; Benedita da Silva; Concita Maia; Creuza Maria Oliveira; Eliane Potiguara; Elizabeth Teixeira; Elza Salvatori Berquó; Elzita Santos de Santa Cruz Oliveira; Eva Alterman Blay; Fátima Oliveira; Givânia Maria da Silva; Heleieth Saffioti; Helena Greco; Heloneida Studart; Hilda Dias dos Santos "Mãe Hilda Jitolu"; Jacqueline Pitanguy; Joenia Wapichana; Jurema Batista; Lair Guerra de Macedo; Leila Linhares Barsted; Lenira Maria de Carvalho; Luci Teresinha Choinacki; Luiza Erundina; Maninha Xukuru; Mara Régia di Perna; Margarida Genevois; Maria Amélia de Almeida Teles; Maria Berenice Dias; Maria José de Oliveira Araújo; Maria José Mota; Maria José Rosado Nunes; Mãe Stella de Oxóssi; Marina Silva; Mayana Zatz; Moema Libera Viezzer; Niède Guidon; Nilza Iraci; Procópia dos Santos Rosa; Raimunda Gomes da Silva; Rose Marie Muraro; Ruth de Souza; Schuma Schumaher; Silvia Pimentel; Sueli Pereira Pini; Therezinha Zerbini; Vanete Almeida; Zenilda Maria de Araújo; Zilda Arns Neumann; Zuleika Alambert
Bulgaria	Genoveva Tisheva; Ivanka Nikolova Lecheva; Liliana Lozanova Valcheva
Burkina Faso	Chantal Marie Rachelle Ouédraogo; Katrin Rohde
Burma	Cynthia Maung; Charm Tong; Naw Zipporah Sein; Paw Lu Lu
Burundi	Christine Ntahe; Colette Samoya Kirura; Godelive Miburo; Jeanne Marie Gacoreke; Jeannine Nahigombeye; Léonie Barakomeza; Marguerite Barankitse; Marie Rose Cimpaye; Pélagie Nduwayo-Ndikuriyo; Yvonne Ryakiye
Cambodia	Boua Chanthou; Chea Vannath; Emma Leslie; Mu Sochua; Oddom Van Syvorn; Oung Chanthol; Prak Sokhany; Pung Chhiv Kek Galabru
Cameroon	Hedwig Vinyou, OSF; Marie Béatrice Kenfack Tolevi; Teclaire Ntomp
Canada	Akua Benjamin; Doreen Spence; Julia Morton-Marr; Kama Steliga; Landon Pearson; Louise Arbour; Marjorie "Maggie" Hodgson; Maude Barlow; Muriel Duckworth
Central African Republic	Béatrice Félicité Bobo; Lea Ngaïdana; Simone Clara Kossianga
Chad	Achta Djibrine Sy
Chile	Fanny Sonia Pollarolo Villa; Gladys Marín Millié; Patricia Verdugo Aguirre; Viviana Elisa Díaz Caro
China	Bing Zheng; Chunxia Li; Daiyun Yue; Daofu Chen; Dianmin Wang; E Yang; Fenglan Liu; Fenglan Zhao; Fengxiang Xu; Guangren Zhou; Guilan Wang; Guilian Li; Guimei Zhang; Guirong Tian; Guixin Yu; Hailan Yang; Hua Zhang; Hualian Wang; Isabel Crook; Jianhua Wang; Jianjun Hong; Jianli Yun; Jianmei Guo; Jihui Zhang; Jingrong Xiao; Jinming Zhang; Jiuhua Wu; Jiying Xu; Jiyue Li; Joan Hinton; Jun Li; Jun Liang; Lihong Shi; Lihua Xie; Ling Zhao; Liwen Wang; Luping Zhang; Meihua Jin; Meiqing Hua; Meirong Wu; Min Sun; Mingxia Chen; Pinsong Wang; Qingrong Ma; Rurui Shi; Shana Chang; Shen Tan; Shuhua Huang; Shuqin Zhang; Shuxia Wang; Sihai Long; Tete Li; Wei Cheng; Wenqing Zhang; Xia Wang; Xiaoliang Li; Xiaoxi Li; Xiaoxia Zhu; Xiaoying Zheng; Xin Qi; Xingjuan Wang; Xinlan Ma; Xinzhi Guo; Xiuyu Dong; Xiuyun Shang; Xuan Wang; Xuebo Li; Yanxia Su; Yaojie Gao; Ying Ning; Yinxiu Zhu; Yongchen Wang; Youyun Zhang; Yue Chen; Yuqin Niu; Yuying Chen; Yuzhen Chang; Yuzhen Yin; Zhiying Ma; Zhongxun Liu
Colombia	Ana Teresa Bernal Montañéz; Beatriz Elena Rodríguez Rengifo; Hilda Liria Domicó Bailarín; Luz Perly Córdoba Mosquera; María Beatriz Aniceto Pardo; María Eugenia Zabala viuda de Polo; María Tila Uribe; Norha Patricia Buriticá Céspedes; Nubia Castañeda Bustamante; Rafaela Vos Obeso; Virgelina Chará; Yolanda Becerra Vega
Cook Islands	Paddy Walker
Costa Rica	Elizabeth Odio Benito
Croatia	Ana Marija Raffai; Biserka Momčinović; Dragica Aleksa; Jelka Glumičić; Mirjana Bilopavlović; Spasenija Moro
Cuba	Lázara Lizette Vila Espina
Czech Republic	Věra Vohlídalová
Democratic Republic of Congo	Anne-Marie Mukwayanzo Mpundu; Ève Bazaiba Masudi; Katana Gégé Bukuru; Justine Masika Bihamba; Kongosi Onia Mussanzi; Marie Bapu Bidibundu; Venantie Bisimwa Nabintu; Viviane Bikuba Cibalonza
Denmark	Annelise Ebbe
Dominican Republic	Juana Ferrer
Ecuador	Blanca Campoverde; Elsie Monge; Nela Martínez; Nelsa Curbelo
Egypt	Nada Thabet
El Salvador	Guadalupe Mejía Delgado; María Esperanza Ortega; María Eugenia Aguilar Castro; María Julia Hernández Chavarría; Marta Benavides; Victoria Marina Velásquez de Avilés
Ethiopia	Bogaletch Gebre; Meaza Ashenafi; Netsanet Mengistu
Fiji	Amelia Rokotuivuna; Jane Keith-Reid; Sharon Bhagwan-Rolls; Suliana Siwatibau
Finland	Barbro Sundback
France	Annie Sasco; Cristina Tézenas du Montcel; Solange Fernex; Zarina Khan
French Polynesia	Maire-Bopp Allport Dupont; Unutea Hirshon
Georgia	Irina Yanovskaya; Nino Burjanadze; Nino Javakhishvili; Tiina Ilsen; Tsisana Rapava
Germany	Barbara Gladysch; Bosiljka Schedlich; Cathrin Schauer; Heide Göttner-Abendroth; Judith Brand; Karla-Maria Schälike; Karla Schefter; Lea Ackermann; Maria Christina Färber; Marianne Grosspietsch; Monika Gerstendörfer; Monika Hauser; Ruth Weiss; Sabriye Tenberken; Seyran Ateş
Ghana	Kate Adoo Adeku
Greece	Daphne Economou
Guatemala	Alicia Amalia Rodríguez Illescas; Candelaria Hernández Gabriel; Hilda Morales Trujillo; Lucía Willis Paau; Norma Cruz; Rosalina Tuyuc
Guinea	Cissé Hadja Mariama Sow; Hadja Saran Daraba Kaba; Joséphine Léno
Guinea-Bissau	Macaria Barai
Haiti	Nicole Magloire; Paula Clermont Péan; Rose-Anne Auguste
Honduras	Albertina García Argueta; Bertha Oliva; Esther Ruiz Ortega; Leticia de Oyuela; Itsmania Erohyna Pineda Platero; Reina Isabel Cálix
Hong Kong	Ching Chee Lee; Elizabeth Ann Gray; Lo Sai "Rose" Wu; New Territories Female Indigenous Residents' Committee; Ngun Fung Liu; Shuk Man "Selina" Sun; Wai King Wong; Women Workers' Cooperative; Yuet Lin Yim
Hungary	Szilvia Kállai
Iceland	Ewa Klonowski
India	Abha Bhaiya; Ajeet Cour; Alkaben Jani; America Devi; Anjali Gopalan; Annapurna Maharana; Aruna Roy; Ayo Aidari Trust; Beena Sebastian; Birubala Rabha; Chaggi Bai Bhil; Champa Devi Shukla; Chekkottu Kariyan Janu; Devaki Jain; Dilafrose Qazi; Duiji; Durga Devi; Elizabeth Edattukaran; Ginny Shrivastava; Hakkuben Theba; Indira Jaising; Indrani Sinha; Irom Sharmila Chanu; Janaki; Kavita Srivastava; Keepu Tsering Lepcha; Kiran Bedi; Kishwar Ahmed Shirali; Komal Srivastava; Krishna Ahooja-Patel; Krishna Kumar; Krishnammal Jagannathan; Lakshmi Sahgal; Lalita Ramdas; Lataben Sachde; Latifabano Mohammad Yusuf Getali; Leelakumari Amma; Maglin Peter; Mahasweta Devi; Malika Virdi; Mallika Sarabhai; Maninder "Meenu" Sodhi; Maya John Ingty; Medha Patkar; Meghiben Samariya; Mogullamma; Mohini Giri; Mrinal Gore; Mrinalini Sarabhai; Murari Prameela; Nalini Nayak; Nandita Haksar; Naseeb Mohammad Shaikh; Nasreen Bano; Neera Desai; Neidonuo Angami; Nighat Shafi Pandit; Nilu Rani Patra; Nirmala; Nirmala Deshpande; Omana T. K.; Parmaben Sava; Parveena Ahanger; Pushpa Bhave; Radha Bahin Bhatt; Rajni Kumar; Rani Bang; Rashida Bee; Roshanben Shaikh; Runa Banerjee; Ruth Manorama; Saraswathi; Shabnam Hashmi; Shahjehan Aapa; Shanta Devi; Sharda Devi; Sheila Didi; Shyamala Natarajan; Sonia; Sukha "Doctor"; Sumitra; Sushobha Barve; Teesta Setalvad; Tiliya Devi; Tripurari Sharma; Tsering Landol; Urvashi Butalia; Vandana Shiva; Vasanth Kannabiran; Vina Mazumdar; Yashoda Sharma
Indonesia	Ade Rostina Sitompul; Aleta Baun; Brigitta Renyaan; Dewi Rana Amir; Esthi Susanti Hudiono; Farha Ciciek; Galuh Wandita; Henny Yudea; Hermawati; Hilda Djulaida Rolobessy; Julien Florence Mona Saroinsong; Kamala Chandrakirana; Lily Djenaan; Nani Zulminarni; Nursyahbani Katjasungkana; Paula Makabory; Ratna Indraswari; Samsidar; Maria Cecilia; Sophie Patty; Yosepha Alomang; Yusan Yeblo; Zohra Andi Baso
Iraq	Hero Ahmad; Susan Ahmed-Böhme
Israel	Aida Touma-Suleiman; Amal Elsana Alh'jooj; Anat Biletzki; Angelica Edna Calo Livne; Haya Shalom; Nabila Espanioly; Rela Mazali; Ruchama Marton
Italy	Chiara Lubich; Letizia Battaglia; Luisa Morgantini; Marilee Karl; Paola Battagliola
Ivory Coast	Dandi Lou Hélène Amanan; Lotti Latrous
Jamaica	Madge Saunders
Japan	Katsuko Nomura; Kumiko Yokoi; Song Sin-do; Suzuyo Takazato; Yuki Ando; Yukika Sohma
Jordan	Haifa Abu Ghazaleh; Insaf Arafat; Laurice Hlass; Taghreed Hikmat
Kazakhstan	Dametken Alenova; Irina Unzhakova; Lazzat Ishmukhamedova; Rozlana Taukina
Kenya	Dekha Ibrahim Abdi; Florence Muia; Grace Naninaai Saita; Litha Musyimi-Ogana; Musimbi Kanyoro; Rodah Chepkobus Rotino; Tecla Namachanja Wanjala; Veronica Wanjiru Kinyanjui; Wahu Kaara
Kosovo	Fatmire Feka
Kuwait	Lulwah Al-Qatami; Mudi Al-Essa; Nabeela Abdulla Al Mulla
Kyrgyzstan	Asipa Musaeva; Aziza Abdirasulova; Byubyusara Ryskulova; Gulnara Derbisheva; Raisa Kadyrova; Tolekan Ismailova
Laos	Boualaphet Chounthavong; Douangdeuane Bounyavong; Kommaly Chanthavong; Kongdeuane Nettavong; Layvanh Phanludeth; Ny Luangkhot; Sinuan
Lebanon	Bahia Hariri
Liberia	Mary Brownell; Ruth Perry
Libya	Farida Allaghi
Madagascar	Florentine Bodo Ramambasoa; Lalao Flaurence Randriamampionona
Malawi	Felister Chinthunzi; Helen Munthali; Irene Chaluluka; Rose Chibambo; Violet Chavula
Malaysia	Irene Fernandez; Zainah Anwar
Mali	Aminata Touré; Cissouma Korotoumou Traore; Dembélé Mariam Sidibé; Diakité Fatoumata N'Diaye; Fatimata Touré; Fatoumata Dembélé Diarra; Henriette Carvalho Kouyate; Hiri Maguiraga; Maïmouna Coulibaly Camara; Mama Koite Doumbia; Moussomakan Sakiliba; N'Diaye Korotoumou Traoré; Sirandou Bocoum; Tahanouma Walet Abeb; Togo Mariam Baro
Marshall Islands	Carmen Bigler
Mauritania	Aïssata Kane; Azza Mint Moma
Mauritius	Aurélie Marie-Lisette Talate
Mexico	Guadalupe Hernández Dimas; Macedonia Blas Flores; Maria del Pilar Sertvije de Mariscal; Marta Lamas; Martha Lucía Mícher; Nuria Costa Leonardo; Patria Jiménez; Rosario Ibarra de Piedra; Sandra Jiménez Loza; Sara Lovera; Sylvia Aguilera García; Teresa Ulloa Ziáurriz
Micronesia	Shinobu Mailo Poll
Moldova	Ala Nemerenco; Alina Radu; Cleopatra Vnorovschi
Mongolia	Bat-Sereedene Byamba; Byats-Khandaa Jargal; Chinchuluun Naidandorj; Odonchimeg Puntsag; Orsoo Shijee; Purevsuren Choijamts; Semjidmaa Damba; Tuul Yondon; Zanaa Jurmed
Morocco	Fawzia Talout Meknassi; Najat Maalla M'jid
Mozambique	Paulina Chiziane; Zaida Cabral
Nepal	Anju Chhetri; Binda Pandey; Chhing Lamu Sherpa; Indira Shreshtha; Jagan Suba Gurung; Jhamak Ghimire; Rita Thapa; Sahana Pradhan; Stella Tamang
Netherlands	Adrienne van Melle-Hermans; Rebecca Gomperts; Saskia Kouwenberg; Savitri MacCuish; Shelley Anderson
New Caledonia	Déwé Gorodey
New Zealand	Marilyn Waring; Marion Hancock; Patricia Henderson; Pauline Tangiora
Nicaragua	Esperanza Cruz Rodríguez; Eulalia González Orozco; Gladira Auxiliadora Talavera García; María Hazel Law Blanco; Vilma Núñez de Escorcia; Violeta Vanesa Delgado Sarmiento
Niger	Hadizatou Issa Iyayi; Mariama Keïta; Souna Hadizatou Diallo
Nigeria	Dorothée Cesnabmihlo Aken’ova; Limota Goroso Giwa
North Macedonia	Ermira Mehmeti
Norway	Ida Hydle; Ingrid Eide
Oman	Tiba Al Maoli
Pakistan	Akeela Naz; Akhtar Riazuddin; Anis Haroon; Asma Jahangir; Bilquis Edhi; Dilshad Murtaza; Farida Shaheed; Hilda Saeed; Hina Jilani; Khawar Mumtaz; Kishwar Naheed; Kulsoom Farman; Madeeha Gauhar; Majida Rizvi; Maryam Bibi; Mahmooda Salim Khan; Nafisa Shah; Nasreen Awan; Nigar Ahmed; Nusrat Ara; Parveen Azam Khan; Quratulain Bakhteari; Rubina Feroze Bhatti; Salma Maqbool; Sheema Kermani; Shahla Zia; Yasmin Karim; Zakia Arshad; Zari Sarfaraz
Palau	Gabriela Ngirmang
Palestine	Amneh Al-Rimawi; Amneh Kamal Sulaiman; Hanan Ashrawi; Issam Abdulhadi; Nafeesa Aldeek; Salma Khadra Jayyusi; Yusra Berberi; Zahira Kamal
Panama	Alma Montenegro de Fletcher; Ediofelina Fuentes González; Marta Matamoros
Papua New Guinea	Freda Talao; Helen Hakena; Hilan Los; Josie Tankunani Sirivi; Lorraine Garasu; Mary Kini
Paraguay	Maggiorina Balbuena; María del Pilar Callizo López Moreira; María Ramona Isabel Noguera Dominguez; Nilda Estigarribia
Peru	Angélica Mendoza Almeida; Carmen Rosa Campos Mendoza; Felícitas Estela Linares; Hilaria Supa; María Sumire; María Luisa Álvarez; Pilar Coll; Virginia Vargas
Philippines	Adoracion Cruz-Avisado; Risa Hontiveros; Cecile Guidote-Alvarez; Dinky Soliman; Delia Santiago-Locsin; Elisa Gahapon del Puerto; Hadja Bainon Karon; Haydee Yorac; Irene Santiago; June Pagaduan-Lopez; Loreta Navarro-Castro; Lorenza Palm-Dalupan; Mariani Dimaranan; Marilou Diaz-Abaya; Mary Lou Alcid; Mary Soledad Perpiñan; Miriam Coronel-Ferrer; Miriam Suacito; Myla Jabilles Leguro; Piang Tahsim Albar; Pura Sumangil; Seiko Bodios Ohashi; Teresa Banaynal-Fernandez; Teresita Ang-See; Teresita Quintos Deles; Zenaida Brigida Hamada-Pawid; Zenaida Tan Lim
Poland	Izabela Jaruga-Nowacka; Krystyna Kurczab-Redlich; Maria Szyszkowska
Portugal	Inês Fontinha; Sabine Lichtenfels
Puerto Rico	María Reinat-Pumarejo; Nilda Medina-Diaz; Women Alliance of Viequenses
Qatar	Mouza al-Malki
Romania	Cristina Guseth; Erzsébet Túrós; Negoita Cornelia; Soknan Han Jung
Russia	Aishat Magomedova; Alina Allo; Alla Yaroshinskaya; Almira Adiatullina; Anna Politkovskaya; Asiyat Murtazalieva; Elena Ershova; Ella Polyakova; Fatima Gazieva; Irina Dementieva; Irina Khakamada; Lidiya Grafova; Lyubov Baskhanova; Lyudmila Alexeyeva; Lyudmila Pavlichenko; Lyudmila Varfolomeeva; Mariam Yandieva; Maya Shovkhalova; Natalya Berezhnaya; Olga Doronina; Olga Sokolova; Rosa Bataeva; Svetlana Aliyeva; Svetlana Bocharova; Svetlana Gannushkina; Tatiana Chertoritskaya; Tatiana Kotlyarenko; Toita Yunusova; Valentina Cherevatenko; Valentyna Merkulova; Valeria Porokhova; Zalpa Bersanova; Zarema Omarova; Zuleikhan Bagalova; Zulpa Musostova
Rwanda	Daphrose Mukarutamu; Hilarie Mukamazimpaka; Martine Bonny Dikongue; Mary Kayitesi Blewitt; Mary Balikungeri
Saint Lucia	Frances Iona Erlinger-Ford
Samoa	Fiamē Naomi Mataʻafa
Saudi Arabia	Haifa Jamal Al-Lail; Jowara Al-Angari; Laila Nabih Alnamani
Senegal	Amsatou Sow Sidibé; Betty Faye; Christiane Johnson; Mame Bassine Niang
Serbia	Anna Bu; Gordana Savin; Janja Beč; Sonja Biserko; Stanislava Staša Zajović
Singapore	Bridget Lew; Wong Ting Hway
Slovakia	Daniela Hivešová-Šilanová; Jana Cviková
Slovenia	Anica Mikuš Kos; Svetlana Slapšak
Solomon Islands	Apollonia Bola Talo; Ceciliana Olilaeni; Kathleen Kapei
Somalia	Asha Haji Elmi; Zam Zam Abdullahi Abdi
South Africa	Adelle Potgieter; Busisiwe Virginia Hlomuka; Cordelia Nozukile Tshaka; Daphne Jansen; Edith Matshikiza; Jenet Dlamini; Lesley Ann Foster; Lorna Philander; Mirriam Malala; Nikiwe Nyamakazi; Nosandla Malindi; Regina Makunga; Rolene Miller; Veronica Khosa
South Korea	Yoon Geum-soon; Heisoo Shin; Hyun-Sook Lee; Maria Chol Soon Rhie; Sook-Im Kim; Yu-Jin Jeong
Spain	Maite Pagazaurtundúa; Mercedes García Fornieles; Mireia Uranga Arakistain; Montserrat Sampere Martín
Sri Lanka	A. H.; Dulcy de Silva; Immaculate Joseph; Kumari Jayawardena; Kumudini Samuel; Radhika Coomaraswamy; Saila Ithayaraj; Shanti Christine Arulampalam; Sunila Abeysekera; Vijayakumary Murugiah; Visaka Dharmadasa; Wimalee Karunaretna
Sudan	Aida Ahmed Abdalla; Amna Abd El Rahman Abd El Rasoul; Anita Batris Amiro; Bakhita Mohmed Osman; Bruna Siricio Iro; Ester Kuku Rahal; Fatima Abdelrahim Osman; Fatima Ahmed Ibrahim; Nafisa Mustafa Shargawi; Rachael Nyadak Paul; Saeeda Mohd Bedri Mohd Abu Hadia; Safaa El-Agib Adam; Samia Mohemed Ibrahim; Siham Daoud Anglo; Sudanese Women Empowerment for Peace Program; Zeinab Mohamed Nour
Sweden	Erni Friholt
Switzerland	Anni Lanz; Élisabeth Decrey Warner; Elisabeth Neuenschwander; Irene Rodriguez; Marianne Spiller Hadorn
Syria	Bouthaina Shaaban; Ghada al-Jabi; Najwa Kassab Hassan
Taiwan	Chin Yu Hsu; Ching Feng Wang; Chiu Hsiang Huang; Chuen Juei "Josephine" Ho; De Fen Ho; Fan Ying Yu; Hsiao Chuan Hsia; Kun Lei; Lan Hsiang Hsu; Lin Ching Hsia; Lucie Cheng; Mei Ying Huang; Sheng Hsin Chou; Shou E Feng; Shu Ying Lin; Su Mei Kao Chin; Tsu Chuen Yang; Yu Jane Ku
Tajikistan	Bihodjal Rahimova; Fatimakhon Ahmedova; Gavkhar Juraeva; Viloyat Mirzoyeva
Tanzania	Christina Nsekela; Fatma Hamisi Misango; Neema Mgana; Taghrid Hikmet
Thailand	Phinant Chotirosseranee; Dawan Chantarahassadee; Nasae Yapa; Nualnoy Timkoon; Pinee Moonkaew; Pratin Kwan-On; Somboon Srikhamdokkhae; Somsook Boonyabancha; Thicha na Nakhon; Dhammananda Bhikkhuni; Wilaiwan Saetia; Women’s Group of the Assembly of the Poor
Timor-Leste	Genoveva Ximenes Alves; Maria Domingas Alves; Maria Manuela Perreira
Tonga	Betty Blake
Turkey	Ayse Düzkan; Leyla Zana; Müyesser Günes; Pervin Buldan
Turkmenistan	Mubarak Gurbanova; Natalia Shabunz; Ogul Nabat Babayeva; Sona Chuli-Kuli
Uganda	Jolly Grace Okot; Rosalba Ato Oywa; Sara
Ukraine	Lina Kostenko; Lyubomira Boychishin; Nina Karpachova; Nina Kolybashkina; Olena Suslova; Tatyana Senyushkina; Tetyana Tkachenko; Valentyna Dovzhenko; Yevgeniya Leontyeva; Zoya Kovalenko
United Arab Emirates	Lubna Khalid Al Qasimi
United Kingdom	Anna Hoare; Bernardette McAliskey; Diana Francis; Helen John; Jennifer Ingram; Jo Wilding; Kathy Galloway; Patricia Gaffney; Rebecca Johnson; Tenzin Palmo
United States	Aileen Hernandez; Alice Lynch; Andrea Smith; Anne Firth Murray; Barbara Lee; Barbara Smith; Betty Burkes; Betty Reardon; Candi Smucker; Charlotte Bunch; Chris Norwood; Cora Weiss; Cynthia Basinet; Cynthia McKinney; Dorothy Rupert; Elise M. Boulding; Elizabeth Martínez; Ellen Barry; Grace Paley; Hadayai Majeed; Holly Near; Jane Roberts; Kate Donnelly; Kate Michelman; Kip Tiernan; Linda Burnham; Lois Abraham; Mandy Carter; Maria Varela; Marta Drury; Mary Thunder; Medea Benjamin; Roma Pauline Guy; Rosalie Bertell; Roselle Bailey; Sharon Hutchinson; Susan Sygall; Swanee Hunt; Terry Greenblatt; Yuri Kochiyama
Uruguay	Beatriz Benzano Seré; Belela Herrera; Dora Ignacia Paiva da Silva; María Elena Curbelo Morales
Uzbekistan	Adiba Akhmedjanova; Dildora Alimbekova; Dilorom Mukhsinova; Mutabar Tadjibayeva; Rano Yusupova; Sakhibakhon Irgasheva; Salima Kadyrova; Sarygul Bahadirova; Tamara Chikunova; Tatyana Chabrova
Vanuatu	Motarilavoa Hilda Lin̄i
Venezuela	Ana Lucina García Maldonado; María Inmaculada Lacarra Cabrerizo; María Luisa Navarro Garrido; Noelí Pocaterra; Nora Castañeda; Rosa María Herrera de Hernandez
Vietnam	Bùi Tiến Dũng; Đào Thị Bích Vân; Dương Thu Hương; Hà Thị Khiết; Lê Thị Quý; Nguyễn Thanh Hiện; Nguyễn Thị Bình; Nguyễn Thị Hoài Thu; Nguyễn Thị Hòe; Nguyễn Thị Ngọc Phượng; Trần Thị Lành; Trần Bạch Thu Hà
Western Sahara	Nasra Souelem
Yemen	Raqiya Humeidan
Zimbabwe	Jean Corrneck; Margaret Dongo; Netsai Mushonga
International	Anonyma; Women in Black

== Works ==
- 1000 peacewomen across the globe, Scalo, 2005, ISBN 978-3-03939-039-7

== See also ==
- List of peace activists
- List of women pacifists and peace activists
