= Nicolasa =

Nicolasa is a feminine given name. People with the name include:

- María Nicolasa de Iturbide (1774-1840), Princess of Iturbide
- Nicolasa Dayrit Panlilio (1874-1945), Filipina non-combatant in the Philippine–American War
- Nicolasa Escamilla (known as "La Pajuelera"; fl. 1747 – fl. 1776), Spanish bullfighter
- Nicolasa Machaca (born 1952), Bolivian union leader and health care worker
- Nicolasa Montt (1857–1924), Chilean poet, writer, translator
- Nicolasa Pradera (1870–1959), Basque chef, restaurateur, cookbook author
- Nicolasa Quintremán (1939-2013), Chilean Pehuenche activist
- Nicolasa Valdés (1733-1810), First Lady of Chile
