= Feka =

Feka can refer to:

- Iafeta Paleaaesina (born 1983), nicknamed "Feka", New Zealand former rugby league footballer
- Dren Feka (born 1997), Kosovan footballer
- Fatmire Feka, Albanian peace advocate

== See also ==
- Fika (disambiguation)
