= Keepu Tsering Lepcha =

Indian educationist,

- Born: 1942 (age 83–84); Kingdom of Sikkim
- Occupations: Social worker Civil servant Educationist
- Known for: Service to Lepcha community
- Awards: Padma Shri; Real Heroes Award; CNN-IBN Senior Citizen Award; Jewel of Sikkim; GoS Best Social Service Award

Keepu Tsering Lepcha is an Indian social worker, educationist, former civil servant and the founder of the Human Development Foundation of Sikkim (HDFS), a non governmental organization serving the socio-economically challenged people of Sikkim. A former secretary of the Government of Sikkim, she has served as the project director in the Rural Development Agency of the government. She is a member of the PeaceWomen Across the Globe organization which was shortlisted for the Nobel Peace Prize of 2005, and a recipient of the 2012 Real Heroes Award of the Reliance Foundation and the 2013 Senior Citizen Award of the CNN-IBN. The Government of India awarded her the fourth highest civilian honour of the Padma Shri, in 2009, for her contributions to society.

== Biography ==
Keepu Tsering was born in 1942 in a Lepcha family to a government official in a rural area of the Northeast Indian state of Sikkim and did her primary and secondary education in Gangtok before completing her college studies at Kolkata from where she secured a master's degree. She started her career in 1967 as the principal of the Enchey Senior Secondary School, Gangtok but stayed there only for a short period to move to the Government High School, Gangtok where the majority of students were the children of Tibetan refugees. Moving later to government service, she became the assistant director of education with additional responsibility of managing the primary teachers' training institute, a post she held till 1994, during which time, she is reported to have contributed in bringing out text books for primary classes and training of teachers in the local languages by organizing short term training programmes.

Tsering joined Sikkim Civil Service in 1994 and rose in ranks to the position of a joint secretary. She was in charge of the Rural Development Agency, as a project director, and was involved with the development activities in the rural areas for 28 years. She was the secretary of the Department of Sports and Youth Affairs, at the time of her superannuation in 2000. During her years at the civil service, she also continued her social activities for which she founded the Human Development Foundation of Sikkim (HDFS) in 1997 and was involved in the activities to revive the Lepcha culture and Lepcha language. She also hosted a few Lepcha children in her house, The Lepcha Cottage, and has been taking care of them since 1989. She has been holding the chair of the organization since its inception and the organization which won the National Award for Children's Welfare in 2003, runs a school for the under-privileged children, numbering 400.

Keepu Tsering, who speaks six languages, English, Hindi, Nepali, Bengali, Lepcha and Bhutia and is a spinster by choice, was one among the 1000 PeaceWomen, the global organization which was nominated for the Nobel Peace Prize in 2005, which eventually went to Mohamed ElBaradei. The same year, Sikkim Intellectuals Conference on Humanism, Nationalism and Peace awarded her the title, Jewel of Sikkim. Two years later, she received the Best Social Service Award of the Government of Sikkim, the investiture ceremony taking place on 16 May 2007. The Government of India awarded her the civilian honour of the Padma Shri in 2009 and she received the Real Heroes Award of the Reliance Foundation in 2012. In 2013, CNN-IBN awarded her the Senior Citizen Award for her services to the Lepcha community.

== See also ==
- PeaceWomen Across the Globe
