= Dimaranan =

Dimaranan is a surname. Notable people with the surname include:

- Katrina Dimaranan (born 1993), Filipino-American model, actress, television personality, and beauty pageant titleholder
- Mariani Dimaranan (1925–2005), Filipino Catholic nun and activist
- Zephanie Dimaranan (born 2003), Filipino singer-songwriter
