= Pumarejo =

Pumarejo is a surname. Notable people with the name include:

- Alfonso López Pumarejo (1886–1959), twice served as President of Colombia
- Jaime Pumarejo (born 1980), Colombian information systems administrator and politician
- Julio Mario Santo Domingo Pumarejo (1923–2011), Colombian-American billionaire businessman
- Tavín Pumarejo (1932–2016), Puerto Rican jíbaro singer and comedian
- María Reinat-Pumarejo, Puerto Rican peace and anti-racism activist

== See also ==
- Alfonso López Pumarejo Airport, domestic airport in Valledupar, Colombia
- Estadio Alfonso López Pumarejo, soccer stadium of National University of Colombia
- Pumarejo bridge, bridge over the Río Magdalena in Sitionuevo, Colombia
