= Hadja Bainon Karon =

Filipino politician

Member of 1st Bangsamoro Transition Authority Parliament
- In office 22 February 2019 – 1 August 2022

Chairperson of Bangsamoro Women Commission

Personal details
- Born: 1953 (age 72–73)
- Party: Moro National Liberation Front
- Awards: Nobel Peace Prize nominee with 1000 PeaceWomen

Hadja Bainon Guiabar Karon (born 1953) is a politician from the Philippines, who is a former Member of the Bangsamoro Parliament. She is also Chairperson of the Bangsamoro Women Commission. In 2005 Karon was one of 27 Filipino women, who were nominated for the Nobel Peace Prize, as part of the 1000 PeaceWomen initiative

== Biography ==
Born in 1953, Karon is the eldest of nine children: five of her brothers were killed in separatist fighting. At 18 she married Ibrahim Gampong Sema, a member of Moro National Liberation Front (MNLF), joining the organisation and subsequently leading the Women's Committee of the Central Committee. In 1996, after the signing of the peace agreement, Bainon was appointed to Chief of Division in the Department of Agriculture. From 2002 to 2005 she was appointed to the role of Social Welfare Secretary of the Autonomous Region in Muslim Mindanao (ARMM) by Parouk Hussin.

A leader in the Moro National Liberation Front (MNLF), her faction supported a peace deal in 2012, after Nur Misuari had criticized it. She was elected as an MP for the 1st Bangsamoro Transition Authority Parliament on 22 February 2019. She was not reappointed to the 2nd Bangsamoro Transition Authority Parliament. As of 2024 she continued to be Chairperson of the Bangsamoro Women Commission.

== Recognition ==
In 2005 Karon was one of 27 Filipino women, (Note: The 27 Filipinas who formed part in the 1000 PeaceWomen were Maria Lorenzo "Binky" Dalupan-Palm (born 1952), Cecile Guidote-Alvarez (born 1943), Miriam "Dedet" Suacito (born 1959), Corazon "Dinky" Juliano-Soliman (1953–2021), Adoracion "Dory" Cruz-Avisado (1952–2016), Delia Ediltrudes "Duds" Santiago-Locsin (born 1939), Eliza Gahapon del Puerto (1957–2005), Hadja Bainon Guiabar Karon (born 1953), Haydee Bofill Yorac (1941–2005), Irene Morada Santiago (born 1966), June Caridad Pagaduan-Lopez (born 1951), Loreta Navarro-Castro (born 1948), Sis. Mariani Dimaranan SFIC (1925–2005), Marilou Diaz-Abaya (1955–2012), Mary Lou Alcid (born 1955), Miriam Coronel-Ferrer (born 1959), Myla Jabilles Leguro (born 1968), Piang Tahsim Albar (born 1950), Sis. Puraperla "Pura" Sumangil, A.A. (born 1941), Ana Theresia "Risa" Hontiveros-Baraquel (born 1966), Seiko Bodios Ohashi (born 1960), Sis. Mary Soledad Perpiñan RGS (1937–2011), Teresa Banaynal Fernandez (born 1953), Teresita "Tessy" Ang-See (born 1949), Teresita "Ging" Quinto-Deles (born 1948), Zenaida Brigida "Briggs" Hamada-Pawid (born 1942), and Zenaida "Zeny" Tan Lim (born 1951).) who were nominated for the Nobel Peace Prize as part of 1000 PeaceWomen "in recognition of women's efforts and visibility in promoting peace all over the world."
