= Yugantar Film Collective =

Indian feminist film collective, 1980–1983

Yugantar Film Collective was an Indian feminist film collective making short documentary films between 1980 and 1983.

== History ==
The film collective was founded in Bangalore in 1980 by friends and filmmakers Deepa Dhanraj, Abha Bhaiya, Navroze Contractor, and Meera Rao. It was the first feminist film collective in India.

== Work ==
Between 1980 and 1983, during a time of radical political transformation in India, Yugantar created four pioneering films together with existing or ensuing grassroots women's groups throughout India. The films were shot on 16mm film and included both documentary scenes, fictional improvisational scenes, and reenactments.

Molkarin (Maid Servant) followed a group of domestic workers in the city of Pune. Interviews with the workers exposed oppressive work environments, improper working conditions, and daily humiliations. Hundreds of domestic workers came together to form a group to fight for their rights — first, with a strike that traversed several cities, then with several meetings which produced a manifesto to regulate working conditions.

The group's short film Tambaku Chaakila Oob Ali (Tobacco Ember) was developed in collaboration with workers in a Nipani tobacco factory, documenting a hugely influential unorganized labor movement in 1980s India. Yugantar followed the workers for four months, documenting their routines, gathering accounts of working conditions (including harsh punishments and abuses of power), and finally, showcasing strategy meetings devised for claiming rights.

For Idhi Katha Matramena (Is This Just a Story?), Yugantar collaborated with Sri Shakhti Sanghatana, a feminist research and activist collective based in Hyderabad to write a script detailing domestic abuse and depression. The film challenged Indian societal notions of the home as a place of warmth and affection.

The group worked with members of the Chipko movement, a 1970s Indian forest conservation movement, for their film Sudesha (As Women See It). The film documents reactions of Sudesha, a woman living in the Himalayas, to the arrival of timber traders. Sudesha mobilizes the women in her region to defy both those bent on deforestation and the traditional role of woman in Indian society.

In 1991, Yugantar co-founder Deepa Dhanraj directed Something Like a War, an exploration of India's family planning program.

== Recognition ==
A retrospective of the films of Yugantar was shown at Berlinale as part of Forum Expanded in 2019. The films were digitally restored and archived by the Arsenal Institute for Film and Video Art (Institut für Film und Videokunst) in Berlin. In 2023, the Batalha Centro de Cinema in Porto, Portugal, held a screening of the group's shorts.

== Filmography ==
- 1981 Molkarin (Maid Servant); 25 min.
- 1982 Tambaku Chaakila Oob Ali (Tobacco Ember); 25 min.
- 1983 Idhi Katha Matramena (Is This Just a Story?); 25 min.
- 1983 Sudesha (As Women See It); 30 min.
- 1991 Something Like a War by Deepa Dhanraj; 63min.
