= Joséphine Léno =

Guinean educator, trade unionist and politician

- Employer: National Council of the Transition
- Organization(s): National Union of Teachers of Guinea; Pan-African Organization of the Teaching Profession (OPAPE); World Confederation of Organizations of the Teaching Profession (CMOPE); Economic and Social Council

Guilano Joséphine Léno, also known by Joséphine Lénaud, is a Guinean educator, trade unionist and politician. She was head of the National Union of Teachers of Guinea, a member of the National Council of the Transition (CTRN) and Minister of Labour and Social Affairs.

== Biography ==
Léno worked as an educator and was head of the National Union of Teachers of Guinea. From 1986 to 1995, she was vice president of the Pan-African Organization of the Teaching Profession (OPAPE) and a member of the Executive Committee of the World Confederation of Organizations of the Teaching Profession (CMOPE).

From 1992, Léno was a member of the unicameral National Council of the Transition (French: Conseil national de la transition, CTRN) until legislative elections were held in June 1995. She was also appointed as Minister of Labour and Social Affairs. In 2010, Léno was vice-president then acting president of the Economic and Social Council.

In 2015, Léno was a facilitator of the election of Guinea to the Union of Economic and Social Councils and Similar Institutions of Member States and Governments of La Francophonie (UCESIF).

In September 2022, Léno was appointed to ensure the facilitation of the Inclusive Dialogue Framework, along with Makalé Traoré and Hadja Aicha Bah.

== Awards ==
In 2005, Léno was named a Nobel Peace Prize 1000 PeaceWomen Across the Globe (PWAG).

In 2022, Léno was appointed as a Grand Officer of the National Order of Merit by President of Guinea Mamadi Doumbouya.
