= Abha Bhaiya =

Indian feminist activist

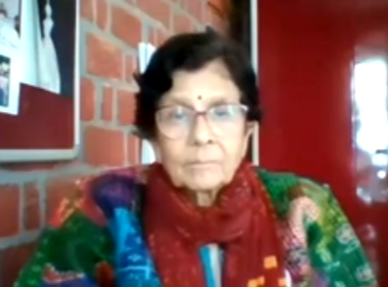
- Abha Bhaiya in 2023
- Born: 1948 (age 77–78) Jaipur, Rajasthan
- Occupation: Women's rights activist
- Education: Bielefeld University (MA); Delhi University (MA)
- Notable awards: Ruth Benedict Prize (2007)

Abha Bhaiya (born 1948) is an Indian feminist activist and cofounder of Jagori Rural Charitable Trust (JRCT), a community-based women empowerment organization. She has been an active participant in women's rights movements since the 1970s, advocating for a range of issues including "social, political and economic rights of women; the status of single women; women's right to health, bodily integrity and well-being; sex and sexualities; against militarization, fundamentalisms; food securities and livelihoods, organic agriculture and the increasing erosion of civil rights of the poorest."

== Early life and education ==
Bhaiya was born in 1948 to a conservative Marwari family in Jaipur, Rajasthan. She has three siblings—two sisters and one brother. Growing up, Bhaiya observed that her brother was afforded preferential treatment in the household, and began to understand "why he was conceived in the first place after three girls". As a child and young adult, she struggled to get an education and to choose a profession aligned with her interests, as her family did not see the merit in educating girls. In 1961, while completing her schooling, she met and befriended poet, author, developmental feminist activist, and social scientist Kamla Bhasin.

Within her social context, Bhaiya had no role models, except her mother. Despite their "rather strained" relationship, she was inspired by her mother's strength to navigate life under extenuating circumstances with minimal resources. For Bhaiya, "living in a conservative family as a married daughter-in-law, confined to home and domesticity", was unimaginable; as a result, she started questioning the "politics of poverty and powerlessness" in the context of "women's oppression and subordination" and began to challenge "traditions, expectations and social taboos, including the institutions of marriage, family and motherhood".

After she completed her postgraduate degree in philosophy at 21 years old, Bhaiya faced immense familial pressure to get married. She was forced to elope from home and seek refuge at Lakshmi Ashram in Kausani, Uttarakhand that was run by Sarla Behn, a British Gandhian social activist. At the Ashram, Bhaiya helped educate girls from marginalized backgrounds and lived a "simple self-dependent life". Later, she agreed to her father's numerous pleas to return home under two conditions: one, she will no longer be goaded into a marriage, and two, she will not be prevented from working.

In 1968, Bhaiya asked Bhasin, who was studying sociology of development at the University of Munster in West Germany, for help in securing a scholarship to study social work in Germany. While attending the University of Bielefeld Germany from 1969 to 1971, she was first exposed to social and political activism. "I realised there that it's not an individual but rather a systemic issue that women are oppressed all over the world," she said. She was greatly influenced by the welfare approach of social work practice in the 1960s Germany while working with homeless communities and children of Gasterbeiters.

She completed her third postgraduate degree from Delhi School of Social Work (DSSW) in 1973. Bhaiya was disappointed by the reliance on primarily American and British textbooks for social work education at DSSW. She felt that it "defeated the purpose" of her return to India to study in a more "socio-culturally contextual environment and seek some real transformations".

== Activism ==
=== 1974–1980: Community organization across Hyderabad slums and formation of Yugantar ===
For two years (1974–1976), Bhaiya served as the program officer for Rural Development Advisory Services in Hyderabad, India, initiating a community development project across the city's slums while leading a team of community organizers. She worked under an Indo-Dutch project and encountered the "most deprived, discriminated, excluded communities" of nomadic tribes and Dalits. For Bhaiya, "a process of de-learning rather than using the [academic] social work approaches of case work, and community organization" began during this time. "There were subjective realities fuelled by the power of politics of different interest groups with varied hierarchies of oppression," she wrote in a journal article about her journey as a feminist activist, "The case work approach was irrelevant as an individual doesn't exist in isolation of economic and social formations and of external powerful political forces supported by various institutions of the state and non-state actors. The community organization had to be replaced by community mobilization strategies and multi-layered dialogues within divided communities inside a slum. When violence broke out in the community, I finally decided to choose to act on behalf of the most powerless men and women. I was reprimanded by the NGO for taking sides and was gently asked to resign. That in such situations a social worker needs to remain objective and neutral was glaringly obvious, and yet it did not convince me as I was too close to the conflictual reality." Her experience in Hyderabad reinforced her fundamental belief that academic social work education needs to interact with people's movements to ensure the development of an inclusive perspective and practice.

In 1980, Bhaiya, Deepa Dhanraj, Meera Rao, and Navroze Contractor founded the Yugantar, India's first feminist film collective. Together, they developed four state-independent documentary films with existing or ensuing women's groups: Molkarin (1981) with Pune, Maharashtra-based domestic workers, Tambaku Chaakila Oob Aali (1982) with female factory workers in Nipani, Karnataka, Idi Katha Maatramena (1983) with Stree Shakhti Sanghatana, a feminist research and activist collective in Hyderabad, and Sudesha (1983) with members of the Chipko movement.

=== 1981–1990: Collaboration with Bhasin on Saheli, Sangat and Jagori ===
Bhasin and Bhaiya were both part of a Delhi-based feminist collective led by Saheli, one of the first few NGOs in the country focusing on women empowerment that was formed by Bhaiya in 1981. "Our concern was [working] with women who had been denied literacy skills," Bhaiya recalled. The feminist-duo started by updating the lyrics of traditional folk songs to reflect feminist messages about "gender inequality, discrimination, experience of violence and denial that women go through at so many levels". Bhasin wrote most of these songs that, according to Bhaiya, "were easy for women to sing" because they were familiar with the tunes. "That was the starting point, Bhaiya said, "We then began imparting literacy to them using slogans that they can do something to change their life."

In a National Herald column, Human rights activist Kavita Srivastava remembers meeting the "two firebrand feminists" in September 1984 at a small-temple town dharamshala in Padampura, Rajasthan. The Women's Development Programme had just launched in the state, and Bhasin-Bhaiya were responsible for training the first group of saathins (women grassroots workers). "We looked at them with deep scepticism and wondered what these Delhiites wanted to do in this training of rural women," Srivastava wrote, "Being the last week of the training, the sessions were being run by the saathins themselves. So they slotted the two Delhi feminists grudgingly in their schedule." During the session, Bhasin-Bhaiya sang women-centred songs in Hindi and were later joined by the saathins who sang their own songs "in their local dialect, describing their suffering, their hopes and their dreams in poignant poetry". According to Srivastava, "the air in the room [...] was filled with laughter, song, dance and ended with us bonding even more."

The 1980s were marked by widespread protests against dowry deaths in India. Women, galvanized by the 1979 Supreme Court acquittal of the policemen accused in the Mathura custodial rape case (1972), took to the Delhi streets demanding amendments to the Indian Penal Code sections related to dowry and rape. Other key events unfolded: the undermining in Shah Bano case related to maintenance allowance for divorced Muslim women (1986); the anti-sati movement (1987); the gang rape of Bhanwari Devi (1992) that led to the introduction of Vishaka guidelines for the protection of women against sexual harassment in the workplace (1997), and the demolition of the Babri Masjid (1992). One of Bhasin's earliest songs, Tod Tod ke Bandhano ko Dekho Behne Aati Hain, emerged as a response to these events and went on to become the signature protest song for women.

Jagori, a training, communication, and documentation centre for women, co-founded by Bhasin-Bhaiya in 1984, has published several books featuring Bhasin's songs over the years. According to Bhaiya, when Jagori was formed, it was explicitly positioned as a feminist organization. "We got a lot of jibes for it but we said we aren't against men. We are against patriarchy, and that men can be feminist," she added. The organization runs several initiatives to support women in rural India, including seven nari adalats (women courts), where local women with literacy skills act as nyaya sakhis (friends of justice). They are familiar with legal know-how and "can go to court on behalf of the aggrieved women".

In 1983, Bhaiya-Bhasin teamed up with south Asian women's rights activists Khushi Kabir (Bangladesh), Suneeta Dhar (India), Rita Thapa (Bangladesh), Muktasree Chakma Sathi (Bangladesh), Anuradha Kapoor (India), Nandita Gandhi, Chandni Joshi (Nepal), Saloni Singh (Nepal), Hisila Yami (Nepal), and others, to form South Asian Network of Activists and Trainers (SANGAT). The core members believed that south-east Asian women in the twentieth century, while divided by geopolitical boundaries, were bound together by shared histories, cultures, and lived experiences of patriarchies, globalization, and militarization. Linked through their struggles and involvement in country-specific women's movements, they saw the creation of a transnational network of regional solidarity as an "essential prerequisite" for peace-building. By 2016, more than 800 young activists and scholars had participated in the month-long residential course on feminist capacity building organized annually by Sangat. Since its inception, the course has expanded to other continents and countries to include women from Iran, Sudan and Turkey.

=== 1991–2002: Setting up Nishtha Trust and Jagori Rural ===
In 1995, Bhaiya along with Monica Ghosh, Kishwar Shirali and Barbara Nath-Wiser set up Nishtha Trust to provide affordable healthcare services to the socially and economically disadvantaged local population of Sidhbari, Himachal Pradesh.

In 2002, Bhasin-Bhaiya started the Jagori Rural Charitable Trust in Himachal Pradesh's Kangra district to work with the "most marginalized" women and to challenge "multiple systems of domination, discrimination and exploitation". The same year, Bhaiya set up a feminist retreat called Training and Research Academy (TARA) in the lower Himalayas to provide facilities for the organization of "workshops, seminars and alternative healing sessions".

"Jagori felt decades ahead of other organizations dedicated to women's empowerment. Many organizations only empower isolated sections of women's lives while ignoring or being complicit in other ways women are oppressed. So at times, the barriers to women's empowerment in rural India seem daunting. Jagori reminded me of what is possible. They were unafraid to tackle issues taboo even in the West. A gay pride flag adorned their dining room; Jagori works to expand access to abortion; their sex education programs were detailed and extensive.

Simultaneously, as comparatively radical as Jagori's feminism was, it never felt unnatural or forced on the communities it worked in. Detractors of feminist endeavors in development often malign feminism as a Western import incompatible with India. They'll even construct false hierarchies of needs to argue that no organization can fight for the LGBT community while purdah (the practice of female seclusion) persists. These naysayers would argue that Jagori should take smaller, less-intersectional bites because rural Himachal allegedly could not chew a feminism that is both environmental and anti-caste. Jagori's work proves these naysayers wrong. Jagori's feminism is boldly intersectional and wildly successful.

At the risk of mixing metaphors, Jagori runs while blowing bubbles. They resoundingly repudiate the notion that communities must progress with piecemeal reforms lest they choke on allegedly 'western' ideas that a teenage girl should be able to discuss her periods openly with her father. Skeptics argue that baby steps protect communities from tripping over Ambedkar's radical beliefs that the dalit woman farmer's electoral reservations must be accompanied by market to which to sell their goods. Jagori proves the skeptics wrong."

— Michael Kinzer, American India Foundation (AIF) Clinton Fellow, after visiting Jagori Rural in 2018

=== 2003–present: Involvement in transnational advocacy for women's rights ===
After attending the Vienna conference and tribunal in 1993, and observing the inner workings of the UN system, Bhaiya's commitment to advance transregional and transnational collaboration for women's rights intensified. In 2001, the Kartini Asia Network (KAN) was conceptualized by the Netherlands-based academic-trio comprising Amrita Chhachhi, Thanh-Dam Truong and Saskia Wieringa to help amplify Asian voices within the global women and gender studies discourse. In the next few years, they were joined by Bhaiya, Bhasin, Nighat Said Khan (Pakistan), and Nursyahbani Katjasungkana (Jakarta) amongst others who wished to build and contribute their own discourses and academic practices.

Since 2003, Bhaiya has been a board member of International Association for the Study Sexuality, Culture and Society (IASSCS), an Amsterdam-based non-profit that supports the global development and dissemination of multidisciplinary social and cultural research on sexuality. By 2016, IASSCS had organized ten international conferences attended by activists, academics, researchers. In addition, the network prioritized research training and support through regular publications, and advanced policy and advocacy work. Bhaiya was appointed as the coordinator of IASSCS' advocacy committee deepened her understanding of country-specific issues related to sexual rights, multiple sexual identities and sexual expression. The participatory leaner-centred frameworks and qualitative feminist research methodologies resulted in two significant publications: Manual on Sexual Rights and Sexual Empowerment (Bhaiya and Wierenga 2007) and Heteronormativity, Passionate Aesthetics and Symbolic Subversion in Asia (Wieringa et al. 2015), examining the life trajectories of women living beyond the bounds of heteronormativity in Jakarta and Delhi, including widows, sex workers and young, urban lesbians. Later, the research and training efforts within IASSCS strengthened activities pertaining to sexuality and sexual rights within Jagori Rural and Sangat. Realising that most women and adolescent girls, especially in rural settings, possessed limited knowledge about their own body, both organizations organized 'body literacy' sessions in almost 60 schools and village collectives to educate young girls about female anatomy and sexuality. Securing acceptance from school authorities to initiate these sessions was a challenging process due to the existing stigma around sex education. "Majority of cases of violence are also related to sex as one of the core issues that creates discord and a sense of lack of fulfilment, especially for women," Bhaiya said, "Our work experience has made the team confi dent of talking about these issues in an open and non-judgmental environment."

In 2011, Bhaiya became one of the founding members of the Women's Regional Network (WRN), a network of civil society leaders and international delegates working to address the interlinked south-Asian issues of peace and security, justice and governance and growing militarization. WRN was launched after representatives from civil society organizations embarked on a listening tour of Afghanistan, Pakistan, and India that concluded with the women unanimously agreeing that their individual work on women's security across conflict-prone areas would greatly benefit from collaborative network-driven efforts.

Bhasin-Bhaiya started the One Billion Rising campaign in 2013 with American playwright and performer Eve Ensler, calling for an end to violence against women and girls globally, that was eventually joined by activists from 176 countries. The campaign included training lawyers, judges, protection officers, and law enforcement personnel on the prevalence and impact of gendered aspect on national economy and politics.

== Other social impact endeavours ==
Between 2006 and 2010, Bhaiya worked as a technical advisor for Deutsche Gesellschaft für Internationale Zusammenarbeit (GIZ) in Kabul, Afghanistan, providing gender mainstreaming and gender strategic planning training for government officials. In 2007, she chaired an internal Meeting on UN Peace Resolution in Brussels. While working as Oxfam's gender consultant in 2009, she reviewed the gender national policy to identify areas for improvement and provide strategic recommendations.

Bhaiya was a member of Freya India, a Mumbai-based documentation-research center. She is a member of Ankur, a Delhi-based educational center for women and children, founder-member of Olakh, a women's resource center in Gujarat, Rajasthan. She's also the founder-member of Mahila Samakhya's national resource group, and served on the executive committee of Mahila Samakhya's Uttar Pradesh chapter.

== Politics ==
In 2017, while speaking at the Salzburg Global LGBT Forum, Bhaiya shared her vision for "alternative families" where LGBT individuals "are not just accepted but become an integral part of the community". She said: "It is important to create an inclusive, safe, and beautiful space in nature and with nature, because I personally find it's not enough to have a biological family. It's important, but not sufficient."

She voiced support for the Kurdish women's movement in 2024, underscoring "the importance of women-led grassroots movements in transforming paradigms of governance and challenging prevailing norms of violence and oppression". She also praised Abdullah Öcalan's "federal model of governance" for offering "hope for a different world order in which women's emancipation is central to overcoming the ills of capitalist civilisation."

== Awards and honours ==
- Women's Sexualities and Masculinities in a Globalizing Asia, edited by Saskia Wieringa, Evelyn Blackwood, and Abha Bhaiya, received the Ruth Benedict Prize for Edited Volume in 2007.

== Selected publications ==
- Kumar, Shewli; Schenck, Catherina; Oberlies, Dagmar; Bhaiya, Abha (2023-12-13). "A Participatory Research Workshop in Northern India—A Transnational Collaboration". Sustainability. 15 (24) 16808. Bibcode:2023Sust...1516808K. doi:10.3390/su152416808.
- Kathuria, Poonam; Bhaiya, Abha, eds. (2018). Indian feminisms: individual and collective journeys. New Delhi: Zubaan Books. ISBN 978-93-85932-02-1.
- Wieringa, Saskia E.; Bhaiya, Abha; Nursyahbani, Katjasungkana (2015-09-01). Heteronormativity, Passionate Aesthetics and Symbolic Subversion in Asia. Liverpool University Press. ISBN 978-1-78284-334-4.
- Bhaiya, Abha (2007). Wieringa, Saskia E.; Blackwood, Evelyn; Bhaiya, Abha (eds.), "Flames of Fire: Expressions and Denial of Female Sexuality". Women's Sexualities and Masculinities in a Globalizing Asia. New York: Palgrave Macmillan US. pp. 203–215, doi:10.1057/9780230604124_11. ISBN 978-0-230-60412-4.
