= Alla Yaroshinskaya =

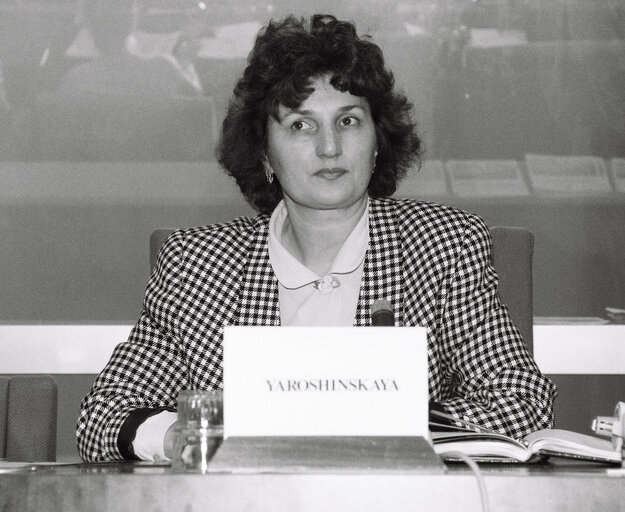
- Born: February 14, 1953 (age 72); Zhytomyr Oblast, Ukraine
- Occupation(s): Politician, journalist, writer
- Office: Member of the Supreme Soviet
- Awards: Right Livelihood Award

Alla Yaroshinskaya (Ukrainian: Алла Олександрівна Ярошинська, romanized: Alla Oleksandrivna Yaroshynska; Russian: Алла Александровна Ярошинская, romanized: Alla Aleksandrovna Yaroshinskaya; born 14 February 1953 in Zhytomyr Oblast) is a Ukrainian politician and journalist. She was a member of the Supreme Soviet from 1989 to 1991, Deputy to the Minister of Press and Information until 1993, and then Adviser to the Russian president Boris Yeltsin and member of the Russian Presidential Council. She has been a prominent campaigner for perestroika and for better aid and information following the Chernobyl disaster. She was President of the Ecological Charity Fund, and is Co-chair of the Russian Ecological Congress, Chief of the Federal Council of the all-Russian Social Democratic Movement and a member of other international committees. She is author or co-author of over 20 books and over 700 articles on freedom of speech, human rights, nuclear ecology and nuclear security.

== Awards ==
She was a 1992 recipient of the Right Livelihood Award, for "revealing, against official opposition and persecution, the extent of the damaging effects of the Chernobyl disaster on local people" and was nominated for the Nobel Peace Prize in 2005 as part of the 1000 PeaceWomen project. She also received the Ukrainian Zolote Pero ("Golden Feather") award.

== Biography ==
As a student at Taras Shevchenko National University of Kyiv, Yaroshinskaya was a political dissident, attempting to expose party corruption, for which she was branded an "unreliable" person and suffered intimidation and administrative penalties. On one occasion the KGB abducted her and tried to force her to abandon her views. Upon graduating, she worked as a correspondent for the local newspaper, The Soviet Zhitomirshchina, for 13 years.

After the election of Mikhail Gorbachev, she co-founded "Za perestroiku" ("For Perestroika"), one of the first political clubs in the USSR, and the NGO Regionalny drazhdansky front (The Regional Civil Front). She also began self-publishing a newspaper, Stenogramma, promoting resistance to the Soviet totalitarian regime. Her husband was put under pressure to divorce her and her son was discriminated against at school.

In late 1986 she began investigating the evacuation following the Chernobyl disaster. She and her husband travelled secretly into radiation-contaminated areas, since the newspaper she worked for had banned such activities. She concluded that evacuees from highly contaminated villages had been resettled in areas barely less contaminated; that the only available food for them was heavily irradiated, their accommodation was inadequate and their health problems were officially denied or ignored. Her article was refused for publication, but she distributed samizdat copies.

In 1989 she was proposed as a candidate to Gorbachev's first parliament, which led to intense criticism of her in the Soviet media, and a criminal case being brought against her for her criticism of the authorities. Despite persecution of her and her supporters, meetings in her support gathered over 20,000 people and she was elected with 90.4%.

On the Ecology and Glasnost Committee of the Supreme Soviet, she continued her campaign for full disclosure of the Chernobyl contamination. In 1990 she was appointed to a Commission inquiring into Chernobyl, and made a presentation on the subject to the European Parliament. Yaroshinskaya and the Commission were systematically obstructed by bureaucrats, and she was not permitted to copy relevant documents. Despite this she succeeded in making copies of top-secret documents of the Politburo of the Central Committee, which she summarised in an article, Forty secret protocols of the Kremlin wise men, published by Izvestia and the Western press.

During a publicly broadcast parliamentary session, Yaroshinskaya presented Gorbachev a video cassette documenting terrible living conditions of people in areas contaminated by Chernobyl, thus breaking the information blockade on Chernobyl. She publicly released top secret reports of the Politburo of the Central Committee. The same day, two assassination attempts were made against her.

Yaroshinskaya initiated many democratic laws in Russia and Ukraine. Following the collapse of the USSR, she published articles criticising Gorbachev, and criticising Ukraine's transformation into a totalitarian "communist reserve". Two criminal cases were brought against her, and eventually persecution forced her and her family to emigrate to Russia.

Yaroshinskaya's political work has involved international security, including the elimination and non-proliferation of nuclear weapons. As a member of the Russian Presidential Council she participated in Preparation Committees of the United Nations (UN) in the UN Conference on Nuclear Non-proliferation Treaty (1995), and in the UN Women's Conference (1995).

Yaroshinskaya is founder and President of the Ecological Charity Fund, the first private ecological charity in Russia. Through the Fund she initiated creation of The Nuclear Encyclopedia, which became a reference for anti-nuclear NGOs around the Commonwealth of Independent States.

Yaroshinskaya is a supporter of the Campaign for the Establishment of a United Nations Parliamentary Assembly, an organisation which campaigns for democratic reformation of the United Nations, and the creation of a more accountable international political system.
