= Azra Hasanbegović =

Bosnian women's rights activist

Azra Hasanbegović is a Bosnian women's rights activist.

== Career ==
Hasanbegović began her social activism in April 1992, after the outbreak of the Bosnian War. In September 1993, she was expelled from her home in Mostar and was able to escape from the city by hiding with a Jewish neighbour and falsifying her documents with a Jewish identity.

Hiding in Zagreb, Hasanbegović worked on documenting the suffering of women refuges from Mostar and Prozor and submitted a report to the United Nations Commission on Human Rights in 1995.

In 1994, Hasanbegović was able to return to Mostar and established the women's association Žena Bosnia and Herzegovina (Žena BiH, Woman of Bosnia-Herzegovina), for Bosniak Muslim and Croat women. The initial 32 women supported each other and made toys and clothes for refugees. The organisation grew to 2000 members.

With 250 former prisoners of war, Hasanbegović established the Agency for Free Legal Aid and Services.

In 2005, Hasanbegović was named a Nobel Peace Prize 1000 PeaceWomen Across the Globe (PWAG).
