= Zazi Sadou =

Algerian women's rights activist

- Occupation: Women's rights activist
- Years active: 1993–present
- Organization: Rassemblement Algérien des Femmes Démocrates (RAFD)
- Known for: Feminist activism during the Algerian Civil War
- Title: Spokeswoman
- Term: 1993–2004
- Awards: Human Rights Prize (1997); 1000 PeaceWomen (2005)

Zazi Sadou is an Algerian women's rights activist. During the Algerian Civil War, she served as spokeswoman for the Algerian women's resistance movement from 1993 to 2004 as the founder of the Rassemblement Algérien des Femmes Démocrates (RAFD), member of the National Committee Against Forgetting and Betrayal and founding member of The Algerian Assembly of Democratic Women (AADW).

== Biography ==
Sadou founded the Rassemblement Algérien des Femmes Démocrates (RAFD), was a member of the National Committee Against Forgetting and Betrayal, and was a founding member of The Algerian Assembly of Democratic Women (AADW). She organised rallies of women in Algeria and wrote for Algerian newspaper El Watan. She was subjected to death threats from extremists for her activism.

As spokeswoman for the RAFD from 1993 to 2004, Sadou collected the testimonies of female survivors of violence perpetrated by the Armed Islamic Group of Algeria during the Algerian Civil War, including kidnappings, rape and torture. Internationally, she presented the testimonies to the world press and Mary Robinson, the United Nations High Commissioner for Human Rights, and attended events with Michel Tubiana, president of the French Human Rights League. The testimonies collected by Sadou were also used in the Shadow Report on Algeria, which was presented to the United Nations Committee on the Elimination of Discrimination Against Women (CEDAW) by the International Women’s Human Rights Law Clinic and Women Living Under Muslim Laws (WLUML) solidarity network in 1999. In 2000, the RAFD established the "Women Resisters Against Fundamentalism and Oblivion Award" for women who resist fundamentalism.

== Awards ==
In 1997, Sadou was awarded the Human Rights Prize by the organization Women, Law and Development International (WLDI).

In 2005, Sadou was named as a Nobel Peace Prize 1000 PeaceWomen Across the Globe (PWAG).
