= Saskia Kouwenberg =

Dutch human rights activist (born 1952)

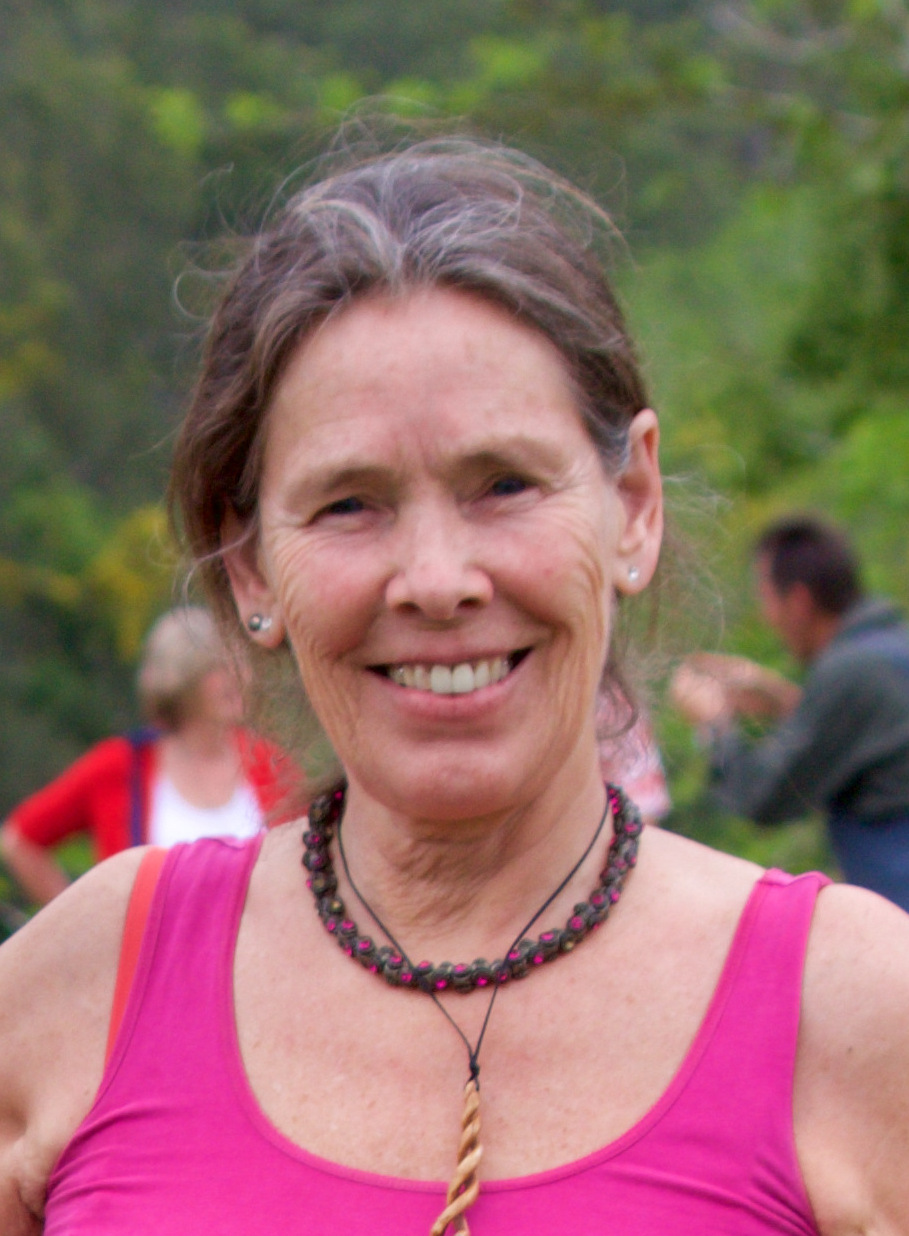
- Kouwenberg in 2017
- Born: 1952 (age 73–74); Zundert, North Brabant, Netherlands
- Occupation: Human rights activist
- Years active: 1981–present
- Known for: Support of East Timorese independence
- Honours: Ordem de Timor-Leste (2017)

Saskia Kouwenberg (born 1952) is a Dutch human rights activist and journalist. She is known for her advocacy for the self-determination of indigenous people, including in Timor-Leste and Maluku, as well as her campaigns against nuclear weapons, colonialism and war, with which she has worked with human rights groups and organisations including Amnesty International and the United Nations. While Kouwenberg has advocated for peace and held mediation meetings, she also supported the raids of military bases as a form of protest.

== Early life ==
Kouwenberg was born and raised in Zundert, a village in North Brabant; her parents were greengrocers. When she was 19, she travelled along the hippie trail to countries including Pakistan, India and Nepal, where she noticed the significant poverty experienced by people there. Upon returning to the Netherlands, Kouwenberg began working in the film industry, including with director Paul Verhoeven, where she worked until the 1980s, when she decided to focus on human rights work.

== Activism ==
Kouwenberg participated in anti-nuclear weapons demonstrations in Amsterdam on 21 November 1981, and went on to help establish a peace camp outside the Volkel Air Base. Kouwenberg used her film-making knowledge to make a documentary about nuclear tests in New Zealand.

Kouwenberg campaigned for land rights for indigenous people in Indonesia, which had previously been a Dutch colony; her father had fought for the Dutch army during the colonial era, and Kouwenberg spoke about feeling colonial guilt. She was part of a delegation that travelled to Maluku to report on interreligious conflicts that had happened there. On 12 November 1991, the Santa Cruz massacre occurred in Dili in the Indonesian-occupied East TImor, in which one of Kouwenberg's friends was killed; British cameraman Max Stahl captured footage of the events, and Kouwenberg smuggled it from Dili to the Netherlands, via Jakarta, in her underwear. The footage was broadcast internationally, and led to greater understanding and support of the East Timorese independence movement, including the establishment of the East Timor Action Network.

== Recognition ==
In 2005, Kouwenberg was part of a thousand women named as the 1000 PeaceWomen, who were nominated for the Nobel Peace Prize.

On 12 April 2017, the Prime Minister of Timor-Leste, Taur Matan Rauk, presented Kouwenberg with the Ordem de Timor-Leste, though she did not receive it until 28 November 2019. On 10 September 2019, she received the People's Prize for Solidarity from La'o Hamutuk, held in Dili, from sister Maria de Lourdes Martins Cruz and the chairman on the 12 November Committee, Gregório Saldanha.

== Personal life ==
In 2000, Kouwenberg returned to the Netherlands to care for her mother, who had been diagnosed with Alzheimer's disease, for the next 14 years. She also went on to care for her sister, who had also been diagnosed with the disease. Kouwenberg wrote a book about her experiences as a carer, entitled Dying, Death and Beyond. Kouwenberg currently lives in Nimbin, Australia.
