= Kommaly Chanthavong =

- Born: 16 March 1944 (age 82)
- Occupation: Sericulturist
- Known for: Co-founder of Phontong Handicraft Cooperative; founder of Mulberries
- Spouse: Noulieme Chanthavong
- Children: 3
- Awards: Ramon Magsaysay Award; 2015

Kommaly Chanthavong (born 16 March 1944) is a traditional silk weaver and founder of Mulberries in Laos. She is the recipient of the Ramon Magsaysay Award in 2015 for the passion for her silk weaving skill that revived and developed the ancient Laotian art, creating livelihoods for thousands of poor and war-displaced Laotians.

== Early life and education ==
Kommaly Chanthavong was born on 16 March 1944. Her father is a farmer from eastern Laos. She learned weaving and silkworm raising from her mother and grandmother when she was six years old. Amidst the Laotian Civil War, She fled to Vientiane after her village was bombed by the Americans in 1961. Her father died during the war.

Chanthavong was able to obtained a diploma in nursing in 1966 at the Ecole des Infirmiers et Infirmieres in Laos. She trained at the Sriracha Hospital in Thailand for six months as a nurse in 1971. In 1972, she married and started her own family.

== Activities ==
Following the Communist takeover of Laos, life became more difficult with Chanthavong having to walk between villages in Laos and Thailand by foot.

Motivated to improve the living conditions of displaced women from the war, Chanthavong with ten members in 1976 organized themselves as the Phontong Weavers. It has grown to become the Phontong Handicraft Cooperative with around 450 members across 35 villages.

In the early 1980s, Chanthavong's group was able to acquire land through a lease from the Laotian government and set up Mulberries Organic Silk Farm, where women were taught to farm for silk and make natural dyes. Mulberries, a social enterprise was set up in 1993, and has grown to support 3,000 people covering five provinces.

She advocates for international regulations to protect traditional weaving cultures in developing countries.

In 1990, Chaanthavong founded Camacrafts to market traditional Lao and Hmong handicrafts.

== Awards and recognition ==
PeaceWomen Across the Globe in 2005, submitted the names of 1,000 women as a collective nomination for the Nobel Peace Prize among which Chanthavong is included.

Chanthavong was among the five recipients of the Ramon Magsaysay Award for 2015. She was recognized for "her fearless, indomitable spirit to revive and develop the ancient Laotian art of silk weaving, improving livelihoods for thousands of poor, war-displaced Laotians, and thus preserving the dignity of women and her nation’s priceless silken cultural treasure"

== Personal life ==
She is married to Noulieme Chanthavong, with whom she has three children.
