= Adrienne van Melle-Hermans =

Dutch peace activist

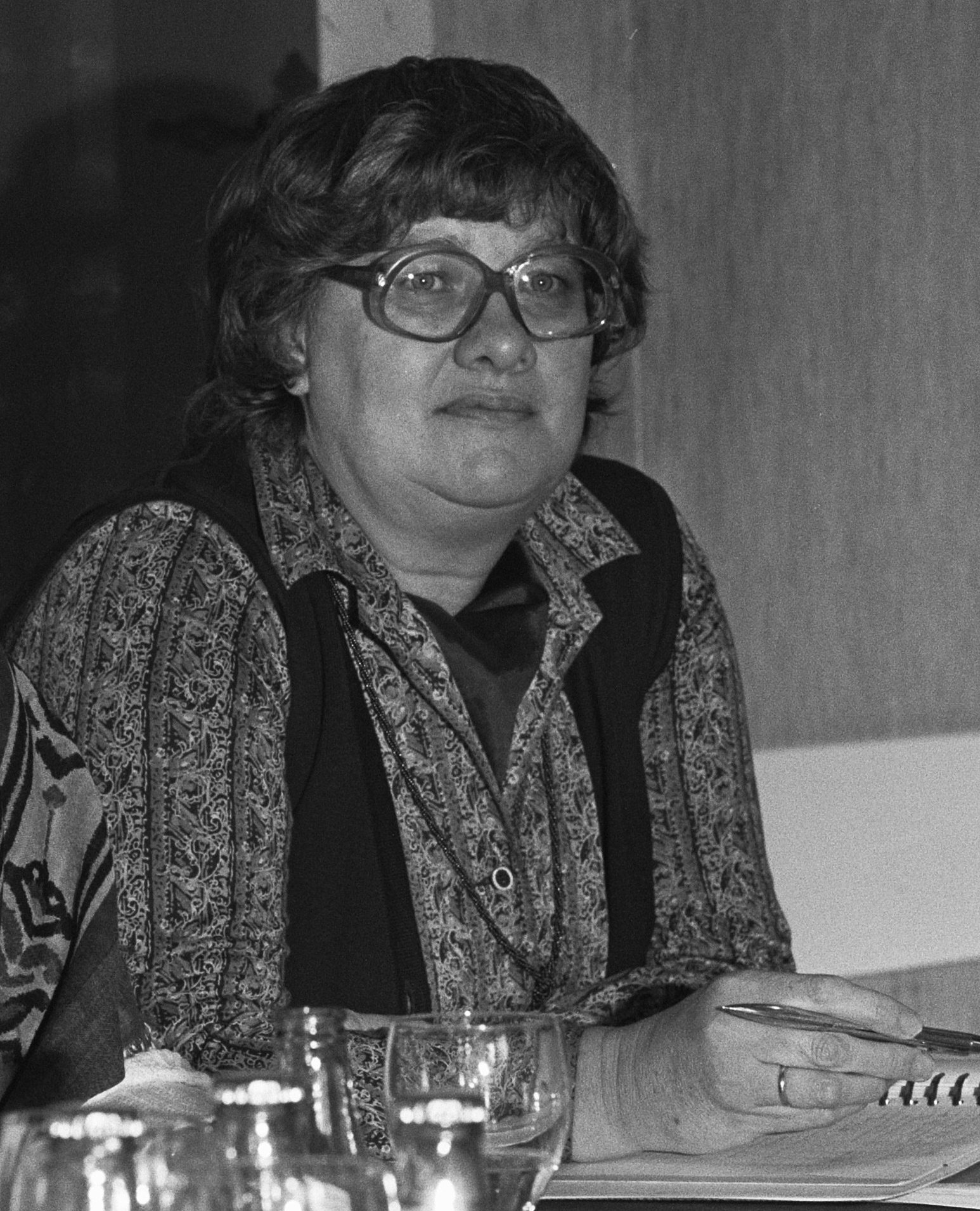
Adrienne van Melle-Hermans (1981)

Adrienne Cécile Marie Hermans better known as Adrienne van Melle-Hermans (25 April 1931 – 23 August 2007) was a Dutch peace activist. She is remembered for opposing racist attitudes towards immigrants and for establishing contact with women from Eastern Europe during the Cold War. In 1979 in The Hague, van Melle-Hermans was a co-founder of Vrouwen voor Vrede (VVS), the Dutch branch of the international movement Women for Peace. She participated in three of the United Nations Conferences on Women: in Copenhagen, 1980, Nairobi, 1985 and Beijing, 1995. In 1991, she campaigned against the rape of women in the former Yugoslavia. She was an active representative of Scouting Nederland until she turned 70. In 2005, Adrienne van Melle-Hermans, was one of the Dutch women nominated unsuccessfully for the Nobel Peace Prize.

== Early life and family ==
Born in the Hague on 25 April 1931, Adrienne Cécile Marie Hermans was the fifth child of the advocate general Johan Charles Joseph Winand Hermans (1885–1954) and his wife Henriette Wilhelmina Maria née Schräder (1892–1947). She was one of the family's seven children. She spent her early childhood in a wealthy Roman Catholic family in Zwollerkerspel and Arnhem. After the Battle of Arnhem in 1944, as a thirteen-year-old she was placed in a family of strangers. Following the death of her mother and her father's remarriage, she was sent to the boarding school O.L. Vrouw ter Eem Lyceum in Amersfoort. She embarked on psychology studies at the University of Leiden but left after a skull injury in a traffic accident.

In 1967, Hermans married Co van Melle, a physician she had met at a missionary conference. The couple moved to Amsterdam for van Melle's work but Adrienne found it difficult to settle there. She returned to Leiden for the birth of her daughter Nienke.

== Career ==
In 1979, van Melle-Hermans took part with other women in a demonstration in The Hague against the use of nuclear weapons. This led to the establishment of Vrouwen voor Vrede (VVS), the Dutch branch of the international movement Women for Peace, which extended its coverage to women's rights in general and issues in regard to refugees. She represented the organization in the United Nations Conferences on Women: in Copenhagen (1980), Nairobi (1985) and Beijing (1995). In March 1983 she arranged for a Dutch delegation to participate in the women's demonstration in Brussels known at STAR: Stop the Arms Race.

After an incident in New York involving her husband had led to their marriage being dissolved, in 1991 she campaigned against rape in the former Yugoslavia. She also participating in raising funding for a therapy centre for traumatized women in Bosia (1994) and in creating an initiative calling for the end of the NATO bombing of Yugoslavia in 1999. She is remembered for opposing racist attitudes towards immigrants and for establishing contact with women from Eastern Europe during the Cold War.

Throughout her active life, van Melle-Hermans was active in the scout movement, helping to organize large-scale jamborees. She continued to serve on the Dutch disputes committee (Geschillencommissie) until she turned 70.

After a four-year fight against cancer, Adrienne van Melle-Hermans died in Amsterdam on 23 August 2007, aged 76.

== Awards ==
In 1999, Vrouwen voor Vrede named van Melle-Hermans peace woman of the year. In 2004, she received the Foundation for Active Nonviolence's Gandhi Peace Dove award. Adrienne van Melle-Hermans, was one of the 1000 Peace Women nominated for the Nobel Peace Prize in 2005 although the nomination was not accepted by the Nobel Prize Committee.

== See also ==
- List of peace activists
