= Nada Thabet =

Egyptian disability rights advocate

Nada Alfy Thabet (Arabic: ندى ثابت) is an Egyptian disability rights advocate, politician and the founder of the Village of Hope for Development and Rehabilitation of Persons with Intellectual Disabilities (VoH) in Borg El Arab, Alexandria.

== Biography ==
Thabet's son Maged was born with physical and learning difficulties. In December 2000 she founded the Village of Hope for Development and Rehabilitation of Persons with Intellectual Disabilities (VoH) in Borg El Arab, Alexandria. By 2018, the VoH was supporting 50 people with disabilities in their education and training in handicrafts. Maged became one of the team of trainers at the VoH.

Thabet has campaigned for health insurance, a pension from birth and the issuing of identity cards for disabled people. She was elected as a Member of the Parliament of Egypt.

== Awards ==
In 2005, Thabet was named a Nobel Peace Prize 1000 PeaceWomen Across the Globe (PWAG).

In April 2018, Thabet was named the 2018 Mother of the Year for Intellectual Disability by the Kuwaiti association Al-Kharafi, after being nominated by Egypt's Ministry of Social Solidarity.

In 2020, Thabet accepted an award from the Japan International Cooperation Agency (JICA) on behalf of the VoH, during the "International Handicapped Day." Japanese youth volunteers have worked at the VoH since 2003.
