= Sevim Arbana =

Albanian women's rights activist (born 1951)

Sevim Arbana (born March 16, 1951) is an Albanian women's rights activist and founder of NGO “Useful to Albanian Women” (UAW) and "Women Bridge for Peace and Understanding”.

== Biography ==
Sevim Arbana was born in 1951. Her father was a member of the Liberation Army in Albania (LANÇ), and fought against the Germans in WWII. Following the war, he joined the anti-communist Legality Party, where he was branded an enemy of the state and imprisoned for 10 years during the rule of Enver Hoxha. Due to her father's beliefs, Arbana's family was persecuted by the Albanian government, resulting in difficulty in completing her education at School of Arts in Tirana.

In 1991, Arbana was arrested by the Serbian Militia at a forum in Kosovo, protesting the lack of funding her women's rights organizations were receiving. Furthermore, Sevim Arbana formerly worked with the now Mayor of Tirana, Erion Veliaj during his time with the Mjaft movement. They have since quit working together following his election to power, with Arbana criticizing him for the lack of support to her women's rights. In 1997, she was elected president of the first umbrella NGO in Albania, the NGO Forum.

In 2005, Sevim Arbana was nominated for a Nobel Peace Prize as part of the 1000 PeaceWomen. In 2019, she was nominated for a Global Woman Award in the category of “Leadership”

She is an editor for the Naim Frasheri publishing house.

== Advocacy ==
In 1993, following the fall of the Soviet Union and People's Socialist Republic of Albania, Arbana founded the non-governmental organization Useful to Albanian Women, the first women's club in Albania, and the Balkan peace organization Women Bridge for Peace and Understanding. Arbana has been described as "first activists after the fall of Communism". The inception of these organizations was prompted by her exposure to The Alexandra Club, the first women's club in the world. Through these organizations, Arbana has founded rehabilitation centers, campaigned against human trafficking, and provided aid to victims of homelessness and domestic abuse.

=== Useful to Albanian Women centre ===
The Useful to Albanian Women centre is an Albanian organization developed to assist women who are victims of domestic or sexual violence, abandonment, or economic hardship. This centre has also served to draw attention to domestic violence rates in Albania and economic hardships women face when fleeing abuse. The centre has also served as a rehabilitation centre for homeless children, provides assistance for teenage mothers in the Roma community, and aids victims of blood feuds. It is estimated that through this centre, Arbana has trained and helped over 7,000 Albanian street children find employment.

During the Kosovo war, the centre was used to house and aid over 3,800 Kosovo and Albanian refugees.

=== Criticism of Edi Rama ===
Following an alleged incident where Edi Rama, prime minister of Albania, "pinched" one of his Cabinet Ministers, Sevim Arbana spoke about the incident on the news program the 'A-Show'. The alleged event occurred in 2013, with Arbana commenting on it in 2019. Following her comment, Enkelejda Mca, the Albanian State Attorney General, filed a 1 million Albanian Lek lawsuit against Arbana for defamation. This lawsuit is amongst 35 other defamation suits that have been criticized as a "way to silence critics".
