= Jelka Glumičić =

Croatian human rights activist (1941–2020)

- Born: 11 November 1941; Netretić, Independent State of Croatia
- Died: 30 December 2020 (aged 79); Karlovac, Croatia
- Occupation: Human rights activist
- Known for: Founder of the Karlovac Human Rights Committee
- Awards: Nominated for the Nobel Peace Prize (2005)

Jelka Glumičić (11 November 1941 – 30 December 2020) was a human rights activist and founder of the Karlovac Human Rights Committee (in 1993), Committee for Women's Rights, Helpline for Women and Children, and of a sheltered housing project for the aged. Glumičić, in partnership with the United Nations Refugee Agency (UNHCR), founded a refugee support organization in 1997 that assisted over 20,000 refugees. Her work included legal, humanitarian, and psychosocial assistance to homeless internally displaced persons during the 1991–1995 war and to returnees after the war.

In 2005, she was nominated for the Nobel Peace Prize by the organisation 1000 PeaceWomen, along with a group of 1000 women activists from around the globe.
