= Saila Ithayaraj =

Sri Lankan women's rights activist (born 1977)

Saila Ithayaraj (born 1977) is a Sri-Lankan women's right activist. She is known for fighting for widow's rights.

== Biography ==
Saila Ithayaraj was born in 1977 in a fisherman's family in Jaffna in the north of Sri-Lanka. In 1987, her father was killed by a shelling during Indian intervention in the Sri Lankan Civil War. As the eldest child of her family, she became a breadwinner to her family along with her mother.

At the age of 18, she married her cousin. After two years, in 1996, her husband was arrested by the Sri Lankan Navy. His body was found a month and a half after his death. From this marriage, Saila has a daughter.

Local conflicts between different states of Sri Lanka forced her family to move. In her new village, Saila became the president of the widow's group Tharaka, established by Shantiham in 2002. The organisation tries to improve the psychological well-being of Sri Lankan people in war zones.

== Activism ==
The main goals of Tharaka under Saila's leadership are to empower widows and to develop villages by improving the education system and infrastructure. Tharaka's fund money is used for maintaining wells and building houses for widows and underprivileged people. Another accomplishment of the group is helping children, who left school because of the war, to come back to education and to arrange private classes for pupils. The organisation also connected women from different regions of Sri Lanka, sharing their experience.

== Acknowledgment ==
In 2005, Saila Ithayaraj was one of 1000 women and one of 12 Sri Lankan peace activists to be nominated for the Nobel Peace Prize as part of the project 1000 PeaceWomen.
