= Khozh-Akhmed Bersanov =

Chechen ethnographer and author

Khozh-Akhmed Bersanov Берсан КIант Хож-Ахьмад
- Born: 12 April 1926; Shami-Yurt, Chechen Autonomous Oblast, Soviet Union
- Died: 22 March 2018 (aged 91); Shami-Yurt, Chechnya, Russia
- Occupations: Ethnographer, author
- Writing career
- Period: 1966 – 2018
- Genres: Historical fiction, short story, children's literature
- Subject: Chechen society

Khozh-Akhmed Bersanov (Chechen: Берсан КIант Хож-Ахьмад; 12 April 1926 – 22 March 2018) was a Chechen ethnographer and author noted for his efforts to preserve Chechen culture throughout the 20th century. Bersanov served as the head of the Chechen-Ingush Ministry of Culture for nearly forty years, and his prolific writings edified moral responsibility and ethics in Chechen culture.

== Biography ==
Bersanov was born in the village of Shami-Yurt to Chechen parents. His father died when he was five, leaving his mother to struggle to raise her four children. Nevertheless, Bersanov was regarded as an intellectual youth among his community—he had advanced two grades within one academic year at the boarding school in the nearby village of Sernovodsk—and was often seen as wise and helpful. Bersanov was unable to finish school, however, as it had been closed during the war against Finland in 1939, and all senior students were conscripted into the Red Army while the others were forced to return home. He returned to work as a secretary in his native village. At the age of seventeen Khozh-Akhmed and his family were removed from Shami-Yurt to Kazakhstan on 23 February 1944, as a result of the forced deportations of most Chechens to Central Asia. The experience would profoundly affect his life and writing, as his time in the Kazakh steppes led him to develop a more conscious appreciation for his Chechen homeland.

Bersanov returned with his family to Chechnya in 1957, acquiring his diploma and working in various government jobs, both in Chechnya and Kazakhstan. He realized, however, that his passion was the development of Chechen as a literary language, as many of the folk histories and cultural traditions had not been written down at the time, and they risked being lost to future generations after the deportation. He joined the faculty of the Chechen-Ingush Ministry of Culture in the mid-1960s, a time when increased cultural awareness had flourished throughout much of the North Caucasus. During this time, Bersanov wrote articles describing the Chechen people to newspapers internationally, as his writings were featured in Bulgaria, Germany, Poland, and the United States, as well as throughout the Soviet Union. He also published the storybooks Lame Starling and Adventures of Hadji Murad in 1966, to popular reception from critics and the press, and gave him a certain degree of renown throughout the region. By the end of the decade, Khozh-Akhmed had become the head of the Chechen-Ingush Ministry of Culture, a position he would hold until the collapse of the Soviet Union in 1991.

Over the years, Bersanov published numerous books, many of which were tailored to a younger audience: In the Wake of the Father (1971) dealt with the experiences of Soviet World War II veterans, and the novels Spring (1979) and Golden Ring (1979) explored the lives of the veterans' sons. Horseman Steel Horse (1983) recounted the exploits of Chechen resistance during the Caucasian War and the history of the Chechen people during peacetime. Friendship, Bonded by Blood (1986) told of the friendship between Chechen war veteran Magomed Gaysurkaev and Russian Ivan Shumov, and probably his best-known book, Treasure of Wisdom, the Path to Happiness (1990), painted a reflective discourse on the Chechen code of honor. The book's circulation soon exceeded five million, and drew glowing reviews from literary editors worldwide.

He once said, "Only books with a view to building and nurturing a whole human being will certainly benefit children. And not every book written on an excellent topic is in itself beautiful." On 12 April 2006 Bersanov celebrated his eightieth birthday in the auditorium of the Chechen Ministry of Culture. Attending guests included writers, poets, journalists, leaders of the Chechen Republic Ministry of Culture, and former colleagues. He is married with ten children, twenty-two grandchildren, and four great-grandchildren. His daughter Zalpa Bersanova, also an ethnographer and author, was nominated for the 2005 Nobel Peace Prize.

== Bibliography ==
- Lame Starling (1966)
- Adventures of Hadji Murad (1966)
- Friends (1968)
- In the Wake of the Father (1971)
- Spring (1979)
- Golden Ring (1979)
- Horseman Steel Horse (1983)
- Gift From Afar (1985)
- Friendship, Bonded by Blood (1986)
- Treasure of Wisdom, the Path to Happiness (1990)
- Animals and Birds in this Region (1992)
- Ialamdovzar (2005)
