= Annelise Ebbe =

Danish peace activist and translator (1950–2020)

Annelise Ebbe (1950–2020) was a Danish peace activist, feminist and translator. She was vice president of the Women’s International League for Peace and Freedom (WILPF), president of Danish branch of the WILPF, founder of the Danish Women in Black network and president of the Danish Peace Council.

== Biography ==
Ebbe joined the Danish Campaign against Nuclear Weapons when she was 15. Her family had been active in the Danish resistance movement against the German occupation during World War II. She was also active in the campaign against the Vietnam War and in the women's rights Red Stocking Movement in the 1970s.

Ebbe studied a master's degree in French language, Nordic languages and Nordic literature at Aarhus University. She translated into the Norwegian, Swedish, English, German and French languages.

Ebbe was founder of the Danish Women in Black (Spanish: Mujeres de Negro) network. She was president of the Danish Peace Council.

In 1994, Ebbe joined the Women's International League for Peace and Freedom (WILPF) and later became international vice president of the organisation and president of Danish WILPF branch. In 1996, she visited the former Yugoslavia. In 2006, Ebbe gave the keynote address at the International Seminar on "Women's Unfinished Agenda." She also spoke at international events on the need for feminist analysis in peacebuilding and was part of a three-member team from the WILPF who visited Kandhamal, Orissa, India, in 2009 to look into the condition of women in relief camps from a humanitarian angle.

In 2003, Ebbe spoke against the Iraq War at a protest organised by the anti-war umbrella organisation Ingen krig mod Irak. She also spoke against the North Atlantic Treaty Organization (NATO)'s claims that the organisation was improving the lives of women in Afghanistan.

Ebbe died in 2020, aged 70.

== Awards ==
In 2005, Ebbe was named a Nobel Peace Prize 1000 PeaceWomen Across the Globe (PWAG).

In 2013, Ebbe was awarded the Drassow's Scholarship, otherwise known as the Writers' Association's Peace Prize.
