= Something Like a War =

- Release date: 1991
- Running time: 52 minutes
- Country: India
- Language: English

Something Like a War is a 1991 Indian documentary by Deepa Dhanraj. It examines India's family planning program revolved on the gender it primarily affects: women.

== Synopsis ==
The film documents the state of reproductive rights for women in India that juxtaposes the detachment of science next to a new form of oppression for women. While examining India's family planning or population control programs, it also focuses on the coerced sterilizations (done by tubal ligation) of women in India and on the opinions of Indian women of these programs and the traditional family life of Indian women.

The film includes footage of a group of women discussing their sexuality and motherhood. The discussions between these women emphasise the challenges women face to be valued for more than their reproductive role. One woman states that women are valued only for their womb, and only if their womb produces a boy. Women in India are objectified by their sexuality and ability to reproduce. This often forces women to hide their sexuality. Once women are able to reproduce they are married off and expected to have children, often at a very young age.

While there is pressure from families to have children, the government also exerts pressure to limit the reproduction of low-income, Dalit and Muslim women, a topic explored in the film.

== Producer ==
Filmmaker Deepa Dhanraj has been involved with the women's rights movement since 1980. She founded Yugantar, a Bangalore-based film collective that mainly focuses on producing films about women's labor and domestic conditions in the southern parts of India. Her other films include The Advocate (2007) Enough of this Silence (2008).
