= Survivors Foundation =

Guatemalan NGO to assist women victims of violence

The Survivors Foundation (in Spanish Fundación Sobrevivientes) is an NGO located in Guatemala that aims to provide emotional, social and legal assistance to hundreds of women victims of violence, looking for justice and protection. The association is composed of women survivors of violence. It was founded in 2003 by Norma Cruz, women's rights activist.

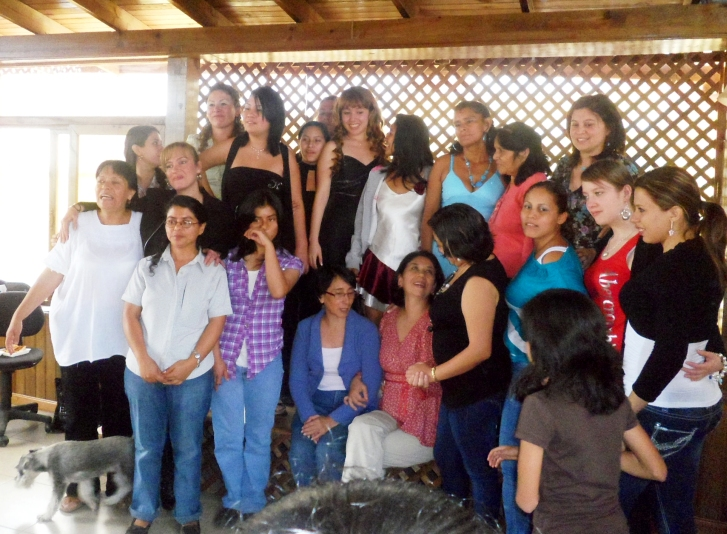
Norma Cruz (in the center, in blue) surrounded by women who could find assistance from Sobrevivientes (2011)

== History ==
In 1999, Claudia Maria Hernandez Cruz, victim of sexual violence, started a struggle with justice. Together with her daughter, Norma Cruz wandered from institution to institution seeking to strengthen the complaint, obtain support, learn procedures, courses of action and get legal support. They faced a distressing reality. Sexual abuse was not characterized as such. The sentences were minimal and these crimes were not relevant to the justice system where stereotypes and paradigms were prevailing. Violence against women was normal.

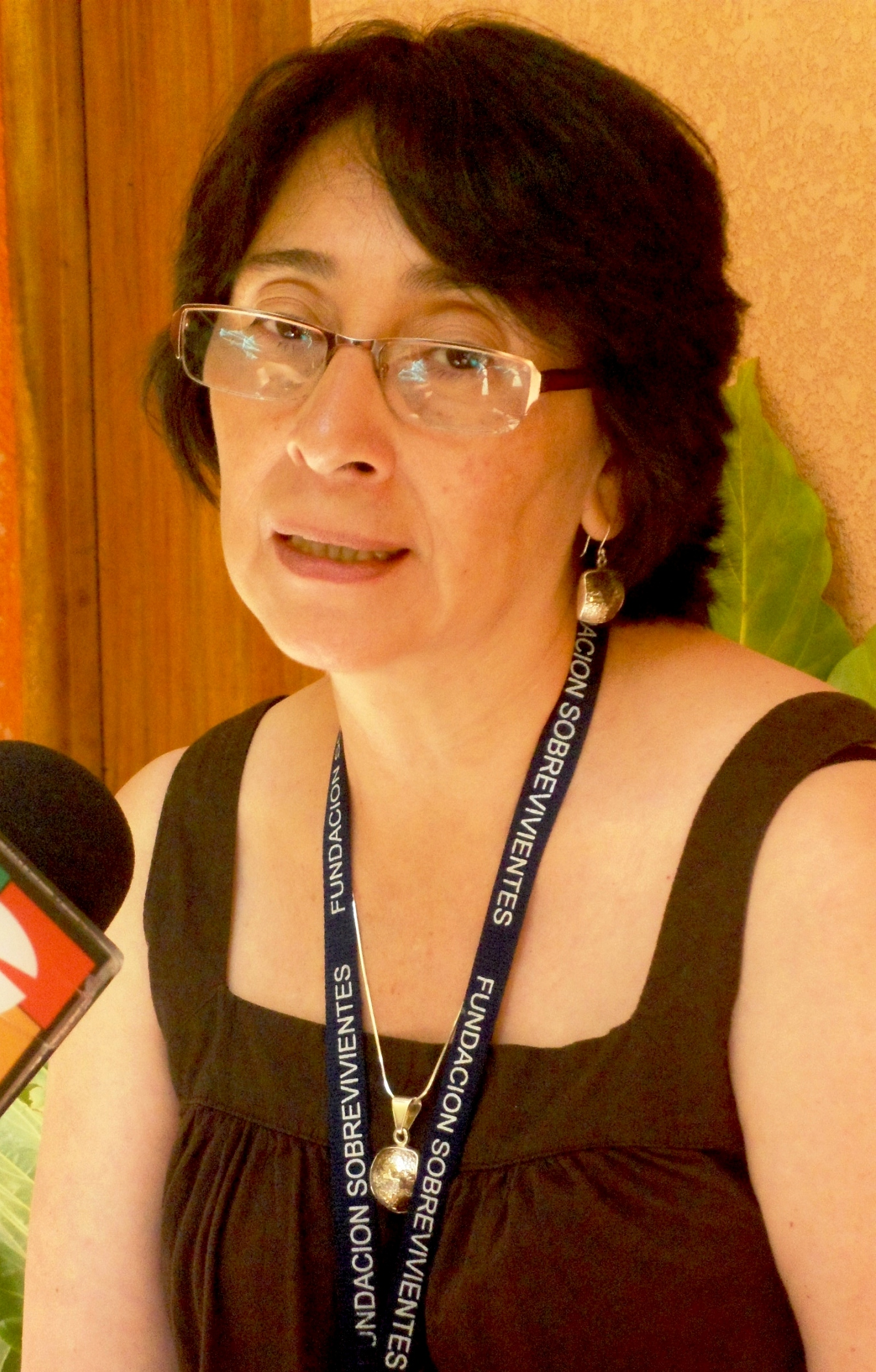
Norma Cruz, director and founder of the Survivors Foundation (2011)

=== Emergence as an association ===
In a waiting room of the Public Ministry of Guatemala, Norma and her daughter met a child victim of rape. Claudia Maria, shocked by such impunity, proposed to her mother to do something. That was the time when the concept that would give life, years later to the Foundation Sobrevivientes, began to take shape. At that time, Claudia Maria and Norma, with what they had learned, began a process of very basic assistance to the small boy and his mother.

Other women joined the initiative. Persons wanting to help, lawyers and psychologists began to build solidarity and raise their voices around the issue. The Public Ministry of Guatemala, the National Civil Police and other institutions began to give them cases requiring assistance. A small office of 5 square meters opened, where legal advice, psychotherapy and social work were given. In January 2003, the initiative adopted the legal form of Association and became Sobrevivientes.

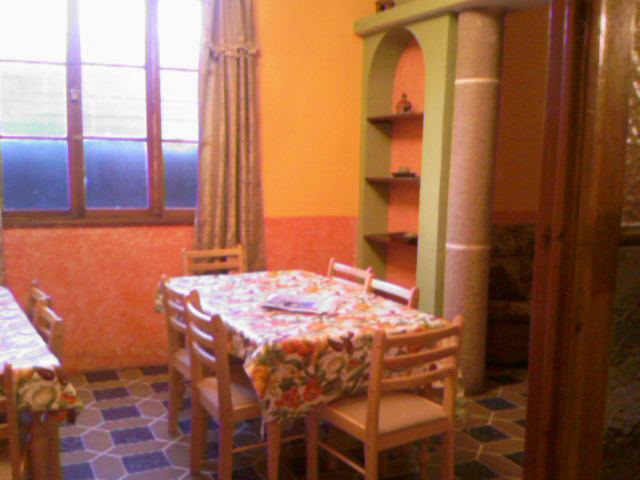
The temporary shelter of the Foundation Sobrevivientes for women in danger

=== Justice in the case of Claudia ===
Claudia Hernandez's case received a verdict. Her stepfather was sentenced to twenty years in prison. This was an achievement in a country where a sentence of this level was unthinkable.

=== From association to foundation ===
The case of Claudia gave hope and caused an accumulation of cases, demanding attention and funds. In order to save resources Norma Cruz moved the office to her home, a small house in Zone 1 of Guatemala City. The home office also became a shelter for children victims of sexual abuse or incest, and for women victims of rape, domestic violence or attempted murder, seeking refuge. Those days were difficult as resources were depleted soon. For the same reason, Norma Cruz sold valuables and raised money with her friends. In June 2006, the association became the Foundation Sobrevivientes.

=== Convictions and protection ===
According to the United States Department of State, in 2007, the Survivors Foundation helped to find, prosecute, and convict 30 murderers of women.

The Survivors Foundation also strives to protect mothers whose babies are stolen: the first step in the supply chain of the lucrative and illegal international adoption business. The Survivors Foundation has given voice to hundreds of victims of domestic violence and sexual abuse and the families of murdered women. It has generated reforms and has inspired others to turn the tide of violence and impunity in Central America.

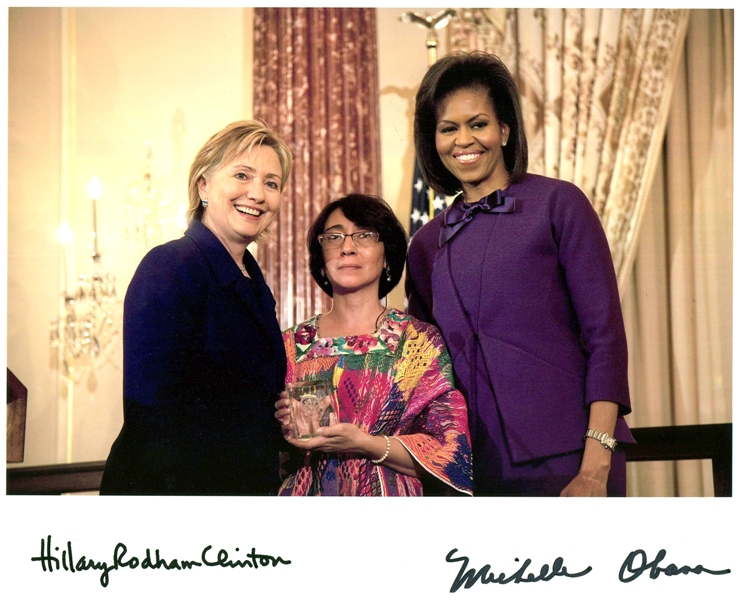
Hillary Clinton and Michelle Obama giving the International Woman of Courage Award to Norma Cruz (2009)

=== Awards ===
In 2009, the U.S. Department of State honored Norma Cruz as an International Woman of Courage. It was stated that Norma Cruz was "an inspiration and symbol of courage and hope for women in Guatemala and women around the world who are working for positive change." She received the award from the U.S. Secretary of State Hillary Clinton and from the First Lady Michelle Obama. In 2011, Norma Cruz received the decoration of Chevalier of the Legion of Honor from the French Ambassador to Guatemala.

=== Threats ===
Since May 2009, Norma Cruz and her family have been subjected to repeated threats of rape and murder by text messages and phone. Although the government of Guatemala has provided police protection, threats followed. This led Amnesty International to designate their work as a "priority case" in 2011. In March 2011, the offices in the department of Chiquimula were damaged by a firebomb. No one was injured in the attack.
