= Kate Adoo Adeku =

Ghanaian academic and gender activist

- Employer: University of Ghana
- Organization(s): The Coalition on Media and Education for Development Africa Forum (CAFOR)

Kate Adoo Adeku is a Ghanaian activist for education, girls rights, health and peace. She has served as chair of the Coalition on Media and Education for Development Africa Forum (CAFOR) and developed adult education programmes.

== Biography ==
Adeku worked as a senior resident tutor at the Adult Education Centre, where she developed distance learning courses on HIV/AIDS prevention that have been influential in the sub-region and South Africa. She taught a basic education programme for communities covering reading, writing and managing finances. Adeku has also worked as a gender researcher at the University of Ghana's Legon campus.

Adeku has served as chair of the Coalition on Media and Education for Development Africa Forum (CAFOR).

== Awards ==
In 2005, Adeku was named a Nobel Peace Prize 1000 PeaceWomen Across the Globe (PWAG).
