= Zalpa Bersanova =

Russian writer

- Occupations: Ethnographer, author
- Writing career
- Period: 1991 - present
- Genres: Academic publishing, historical fiction, short story
- Subjects: Chechen society, First and Second Chechen Wars

Zalpa Khozh-Akhmedovna Bersanova (Chechen: Залпа Хож-Ахмедовна Берсанова) is a Chechen ethnographer and author who has written extensively on the Chechen people and the First and Second Chechen Wars. She is particularly noted for her beliefs that the values of Chechen society have survived the wars. Bersanova, who has written several short stories, as well as a novel based on autobiographical experiences called The Road Home, was one of 35 Russian women nominated for the 2005 Nobel Peace Prize.

== Early life and education ==
Zalpa Bersanova was born into the family of the famous Chechen writer Khozh-Akhmed Bersanov. As a child she wrote poems, fairy-tales and reports in local newspapers. She graduated from school with honors and her passion for history led her to the Department of History at the Chechen-Ingush State University.

== Career ==
After graduation, she worked as a school history teacher and later held the Chair of Philosophy of the Chechen State University. In 1989, she obtained a position of research fellow in the laboratory of sociology of the Chechen Research Institute of Social Sciences. Since then, she has undertaken research on the issues of the Chechen culture and mentality. In 1999, she presented her Ph.D. thesis at the Chair of Ethnology of Moscow State University.

When the First Chechen War broke out in 1994, Bersanova was working on her Ph.D. thesis. The Chechen capital Grozny was being shelled and bombed by the Russian federal army and innocent civilians died in their homes and in the streets. Bersanova understood that she could not stand idly by. First, she took part in the protest meetings, and then she began to write articles and books about the war. She realized that the war had resulted in the Chechen people suffering from deep moral trauma. Since then, she has been researching for several years on the spiritual values of the present-day Chechens. Her findings argue that the Chechen people have a considerable positive potential even after the inhumane tragedy of war and that they maintain faith in the value of compassion and humanistic traditions.

In 1999, Bersanova presented her research in the lecture held in the Andrei Sakharov Museum in Moscow and in 2004 and 2005, she participated in a series of conferences in the United States, funded through the John D. and Catherine T. MacArthur Foundation, on the issues of war and peace. It was there that she conceived the idea of consolidating the efforts of all the researchers of the Chechen culture in order to help stop the violence. Together with her fellow researchers, Bersanova founded the International Center for Chechen Studies, striving to make the real face of the Chechen people and Chechnya's rich history and spiritual cultural achievements visible to the world. She is the author of the anti-war books I Choose the Mountains, The Bought Happiness, and The Road Home.
