= Fatmire Feka =

Albanian peace advocate

Fatmire Feka is an Albanian peace advocate and promoter of reconciliation. She is the founder of "Kids Clubs for Peace" and was named a Nobel Peace Prize 1000 PeaceWomen Across the Globe (PWAG).

== Biography ==
Feka grew up in the ethnically divided village Koshtovë, Mitrovicë, Kosovo and is an Albanian Muslim. In 1999, during the Yugoslav Wars, Feka lost her two older siblings in Kosovo when they were attacked by Serbians and her family's house was set on fire.

When she was 16, she attended a World Vision International summer camp, which was attended by Serbian and Muslim young people. Inspired by this, in 2002, Feka founded "Kids Clubs for Peace." The club grew to over 14 multi-ethnic clubs across Kosovo by 2005.

In November 2002, Feka was selected as an "Angel of Hope" by World Vision Canada. In 2005, Feka was named a Nobel Peace Prize 1000 PeaceWomen Across the Globe (PWAG).
