= Pushpa Bhave =

Indian social activist (1939–2020)

Pushpa Bhave (23 March 1939 – 2 October 2020) was a social activist from Mumbai, Maharashtra, India. She was also a critic, teacher and theater lover.

Bhave was known as the Iron Lady of Mumbai. She was born and brought up in Dadar, Mumbai and completed her Master of Arts degree in Marathi and Sanskrit from Elphinstone College, Mumbai.

She taught Sanskrit at the Ramnarain Ruia College and retired from there in 1999 as the head of the Sanskrit department.

She had taken part in the Samyukta Maharashtra and Goa Liberation movements.

She offered shelter to many underground political leaders such as Mrinal Gore in 1975 during the Emergency.

She was married to the writer and broadcaster Anant Bhave.

Bhave was associated with the social reformer Dr. Narendra Dabholkar. She helped draft the anti-superstition law which Dabholkar was championing.

A conversational memoir based on Bhave's conversations with Medha Kulkarni has been published titled Toils and Troubles — In Conversation with Pushpabai.
