= Laker Jolly Grace Andruvile Okot =

Ugandan activist

- Citizenship: Uganda
- Occupation: Activist
- Awards: Uganda Telecommunications Limited community award, 2006, Nobel Peace prize nominee, 2005

Laker Jolly Grace Andruvile Okot also known as Jolly Grace Okot is a Ugandan activist and a board member of the Gender Tech Initiative (GTI) a non profit organisation promoting gender equality in technology education in Uganda.

== Early life ==
Jolly Grace grew up in northern Uganda region and in 1986 she was abducted by rebels.

== Professional and activist journey ==
After her release from rebel captivity, Jolly Grace worked with several international development organizations, including Médecins Sans Frontières, InterAid International, Oxfam, and UNHCR. She started the Legacy Scholarship, which placed 6,000 girls and almost 4,000 boys in school.

In 2003, she founded HEAL (Health, Education, Art, Literacy, and Sports), an organization that provides dance therapy and other forms of support to children affected by the Lord's Resistance Army (LRA) conflict.

Jolly Grace is also the chief executive officer of Women Empowerment Network and Design (WEND Africa), an organisation based in Gulu (Northern Uganda) which aims to empower women who have been affected by conflict.

== Political career ==
During the 2021 general elections, Jolly Grace was a Democratic Party candidate for the Gulu Woman MP seat. However, she lost the seat to Betty Aol Ochan who obtained a total of 14,706 votes and Jolly Grace obtained 10,458 out 33,602 votes in total.

In 2026, she once again stood for the Gulu Woman MP seat, under the National Resistance Movement (NRM) party this time round but lost to Phoebe Ayoo Obol during the NRM primaries.

== Voluntary role ==
- Board member, archdiocese of Northern Uganda education governing council
- Advisory board, Takataka Uganda
- Former board member, Toro ss and Crested Crane high school
- Public relations, Northern zone district 9213
- Vice President Rotary Club of Gulu
- Fund raising director, Rotary Club of Gulu
- Secretary, the Rotary Foundation Focal Person, Northern zone one
- President elect, rotary year 2023/24
- Patron, the power of one thousand investment club

== Recognition and awards ==
- Nobel Peace prize nominee, 2005
- Uganda Telecommunications Limited community award, 2006
- New Vision Women Achiever, 2013
- Ministry of Foreign Affairs of Finland, Finn Church and Uganda Muslim Youth Development Forum Peace Award, special category Women Peace and Security award, 2021
- Gussosa Humanitarian Service award, 2021
- Lacoba Appreciation award, 2022
- Women in Rotary award, 2022

== See also ==
- Democratic Party (Uganda) politicians
- Betty Aol Ochan
