= Freda Talao =

Papua New Guinean human rights lawyer

Freda Talao is a human rights lawyer and development specialist from Papua New Guinea (PNG).

== Early life ==
Freda Kanek Talao comes from the volcanic Umboi Island in PNG's Morobe Province. She obtained a law degree from the University of Papua New Guinea, a master's degree from Bond University, Queensland, Australia and a master of philosophy in human rights law from the University of Queensland Law School. Additionally, she has a diploma in business from the Southern Cross University in Australia.

== Career ==
From 1995 to 1999, Talao was deputy registrar at the National Court of Papua New Guinea in Port Moresby. From 1998 to 2000, she was the executive director of Peace Foundation Melanesia, an organization that promotes the use of mediation and restorative justice by applying Melanesian custom law, and aims to establish sustainable community justice. At the same time, she was a director of the PNG Conservation Trust Fund. From 2002 to 2009, she was executive director on a voluntary basis at the Individual and Community Advocacy Forum (ICRAF), while carrying out an assignment as a senior development specialist with Australian Aid, As a result of this work, particularly her role in the peacebuilding process after the civil war between the secessionist Bougainville Revolutionary Army and the PNG government, she was one of six PNG women nominated for the Nobel Peace Prize in 2005 as part of the "1000 Peace Women Project". She was the author in 2009 of a country report on human rights in PNG. She was also executive director of the Family and Sexual Violence Action Committee (FSVAC).

From 2005, Talao was a director of the Civil Aviation Safety Authority of Papua New Guinea and, following a merger in 2007, a director of the new National Airports Corporation of PNG. She has worked with the PNG Mama Graun Conservation Trust Fund. In 2012, she was appointed as the first female director of Bank South Pacific (BSP), Papua New Guinea's largest bank, resigning in 2019. From 2014 to 2017, she worked as a lawyer in Papua New Guinea and Brisbane, where she has been based since 2015, carrying out several roles.
