= Safaa El-Agib Adam =

Sudanese social activist

- Born: 1960 (age 65–66); West Darfur
- Citizenship: Sudan
- Occupation: Human Rights Activist

Safaa El-Agib Adam (born 1960, El-Geneina, West Darfur, Sudan) is a social activist.

After graduating from the University of Khartoum, Elagib joined the Save the Children Fund (SCF) UK for a year, working on relief operations in Darfur and relief coordination in Port Sudan. She is currently affiliated with many organizations as a volunteer and private consultant. Elagib's current focuses are supporting underprivileged women and as a peace activist.

Elagib was awarded a human rights prize by the Swiss Freedom and Human Rights Foundation.
