= Real Heroes Award =

Indian service award

The Real Heroes Award
- Awarded for: Humanitarian Work
- Country: India
- Presented by: Reliance Industries; CNN-IBN
- First award: 2008
- Website: Real Heroes Award

Television/radio coverage
- Network: CNN-IBN, IBN-7, IBN-Lokmat

Real Heroes Award, is a social initiative by CNN-IBN in collaboration with Reliance Industries, instituted in 2008 to honour Indians for their contribution to society. The objective of recognising the ordinary citizens who have devoted their lives towards shaping a better society. The first annual ceremony was in 2008, and featured 24 awards.

== Jury ==
The selection process involves a panel of judges checking quoted events, persons and places.

== Slogan ==
Ordinary People Extraordinary Service

== Categories ==
Honouring unsung heroes every year, the award acknowledges the service of people in diverse fields including:

- Women Empowerment
- Youth
- Social Welfare
- Health& Disability
- Education& Children
- Sports
- Environment
- A Life Time Achievement Award is also given to a person who has dedicated his/her life towards the betterment of the society.

=== Images ===
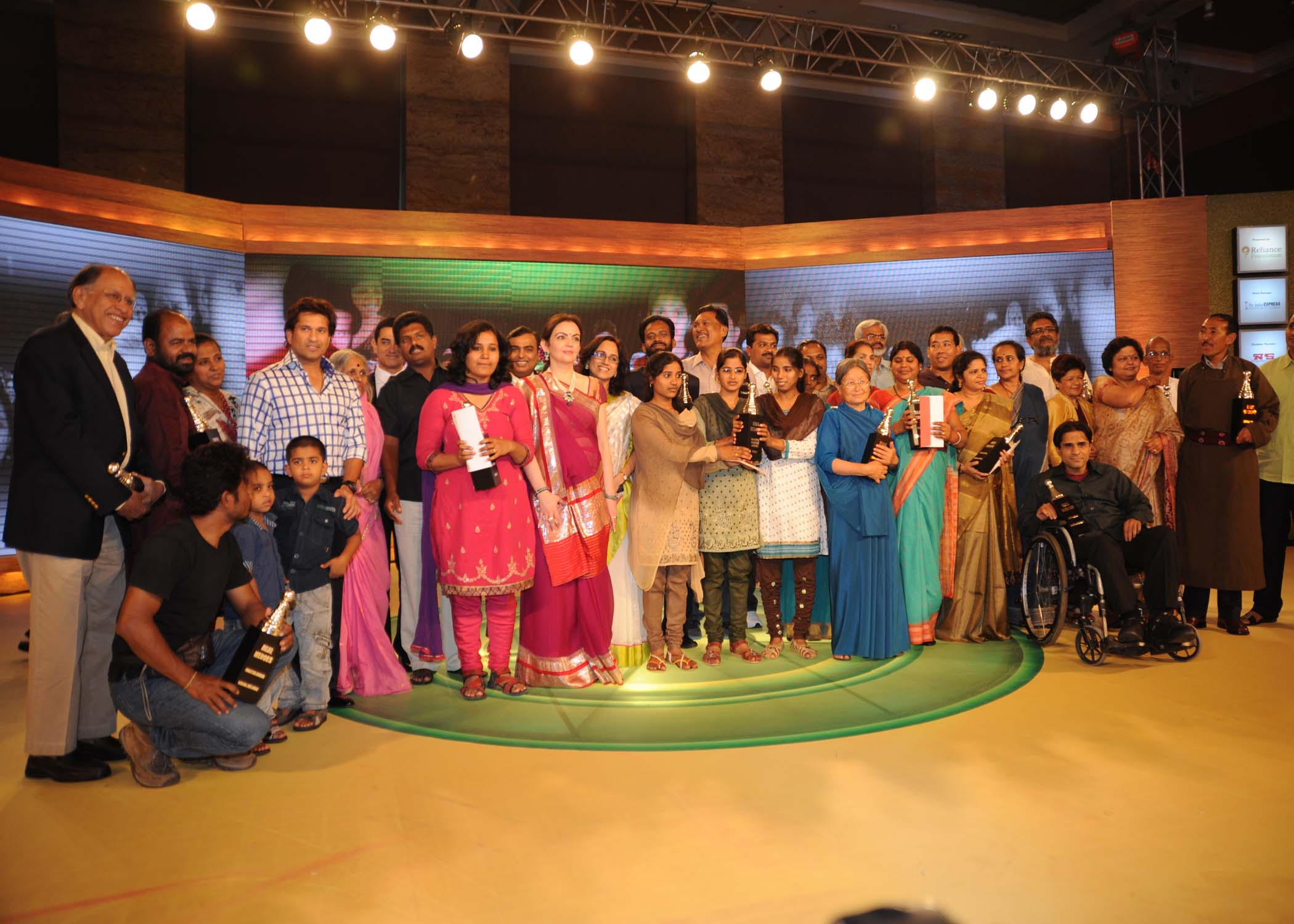

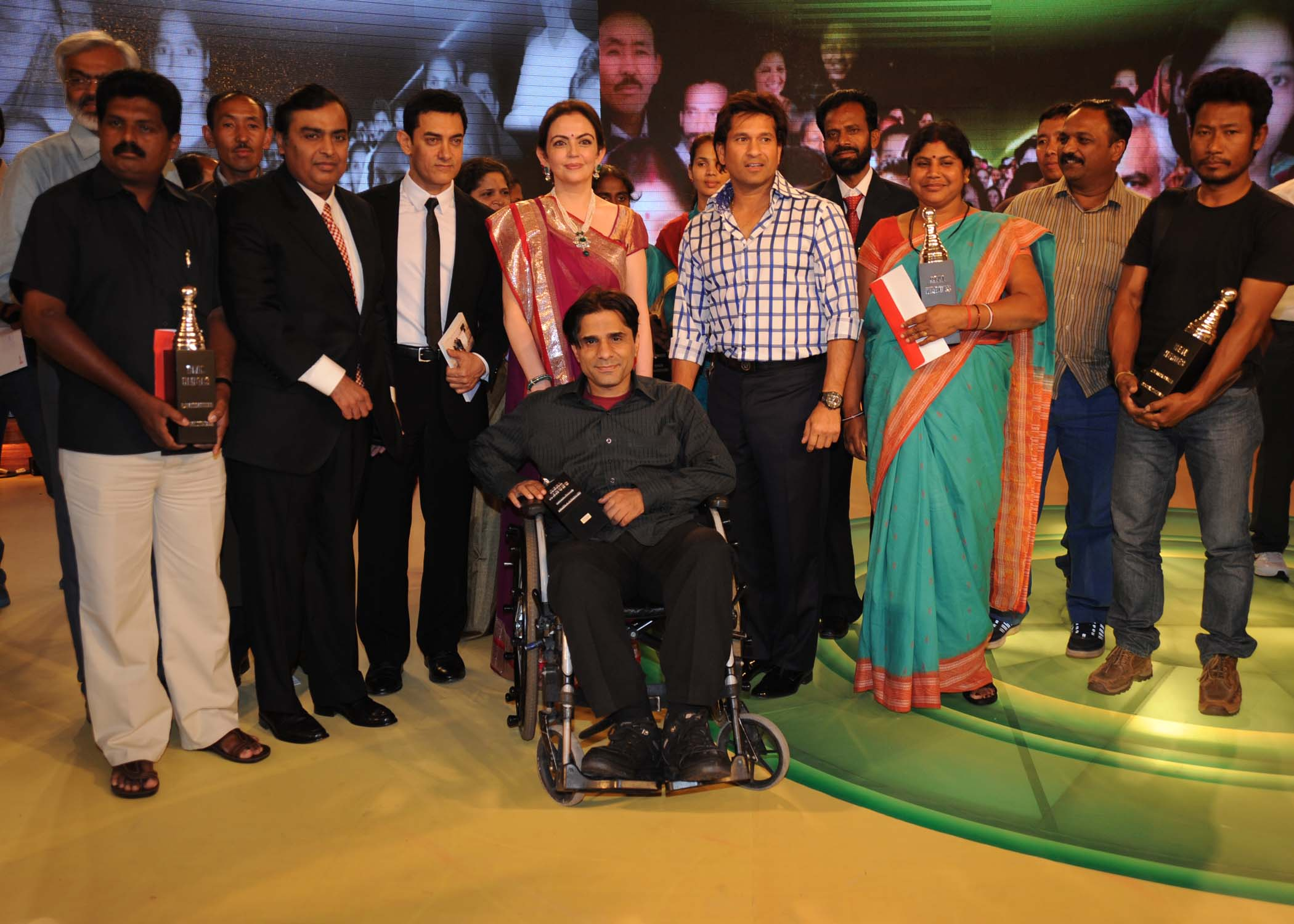
