= Diakité Fatoumata N'Diaye =

Malian diplomat and politician (b. 1954)

Ambassador of Mali to Tunisia
- In office January 2017 – April 25, 2023
- Succeeded by: Moussa Soro Sy

Minister of Social Development, Solidarity, and the Elderly
- In office 2000–2002

Personal details
- Born: April 1954 (age 72) Bamako, French Sudan (now Mali)
- Education: Toulouse Capitole University; University of Paris I

Diakité Fatoumata N'Diaye is a Malian politician and diplomat who has served as Minister of Public Health in 1991, Minister of Health in 1997, and Minister of Social Development between 2000 and 2002. In 2017, N'Diaye became the Malian ambassador to Tunisia.

== Biography ==
N'Diaye was born in Bamako, French Sudan (now Mali) in April 1954. She first went to a regional school in Segou, and continued her studies at the Catholic Mission in Segou where she graduated in 1968. She then studied modern literature at the Lycée de Jeunes Filles de Bamako and transferred to Toulouse Capitole University where she obtained a master's degree in civil law in 1976. N'Diaye obtained a PhD in civil law from the University of Paris I in 1978.

Between 1983 and 1991 N'Diaye was a professor at the National School of Administration. During this time, she also rose up the ranks in the Malian government, becoming an advisor to the general secretariat, head of publications for that department, and then director of the cabinet for the Ministry of Youth and Sports. In 1991, she was appointed as the Minister of Public Health, Social Action, and the Promotion of Women in the transitional government after the 1991 Malian coup d'état. The next year, she was appointed as Minister of Tourism and deputy secretary general of the government. Between 1993 and 1997, N'Diaye was the Minister for the Promotion of Women, and in 1997 became Minister of Health of Mali. As minister of health, N'Diaye focused on efforts to curb tobacco addiction in Mali. Between 2000 and 2002, N'Diaye served as the Minister of Social Development, Solidarity, and the Elderly.

N'Diaye served as mediator and ombudsman for various organizations in the Malian government between 2002 and 2009. She served as secretary-general of Mali between 2009 and 2017, when she was appointed as the Malian ambassador to Tunisia. In April 2023, she was succeeded as ambassador by Moussa Soro Sy.
