= Barbara Nath-Wiser =

Austrian-Indian doctor

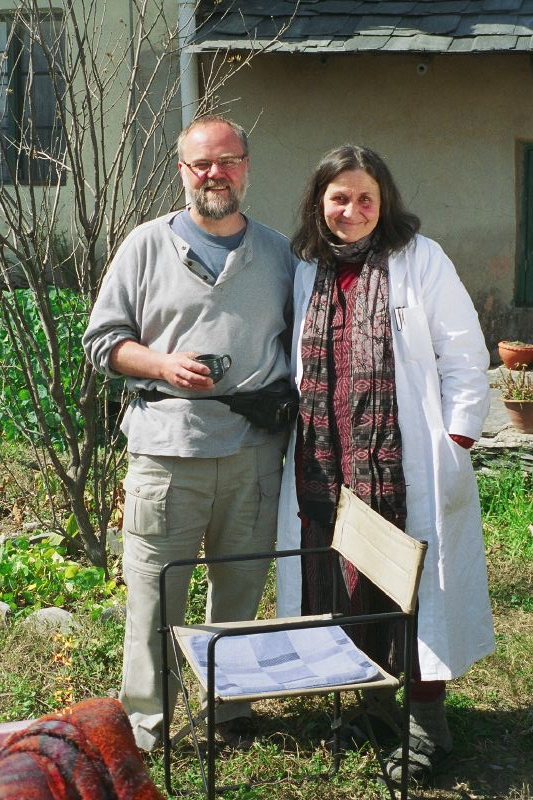
with Dr Barbara Nath-Wiser in 2005

Barbara Nath-Wiser (born February 28, 1949, in Linz) is an Austrian-Indian doctor.

Barbara Nath-Wiser studied medicine in Vienna, then emigrated to India after completing her studies in 1978 to do a yoga training and made the acquaintance of her teacher and later husband Krishan Nath Baba. In 1984, she founded the Nishtha - Rural Health, Education and Environment Center (Sanskrit nishta "trust") for the people of the Kangra Valley in her husband Krishan Nath Baba's home town of Sidhbari in the north Indian state of Himachal Pradesh. In addition to conventional treatment methods, this health center also offers homeopathy, acupuncture and Ayurveda.

In 1986, her husband passed away. Barbara Nath-Wiser decided to stay in India and continue her project. In 2004, Barbara Nath-Wiser was honored with the Two Wings Award. In 2005, she was nominated for the Nobel Peace Prize as part of 1000 Women for the Nobel Peace Prize 2005. In 2015, she was awarded the Golden Decoration of Honor for Services to the Republic of Austria for "outstanding social work", which corresponds to the order level Ritter.

Nath-Wiser's marriage produced two children.
