= Norma Cruz =

Guatemalan human rights activist

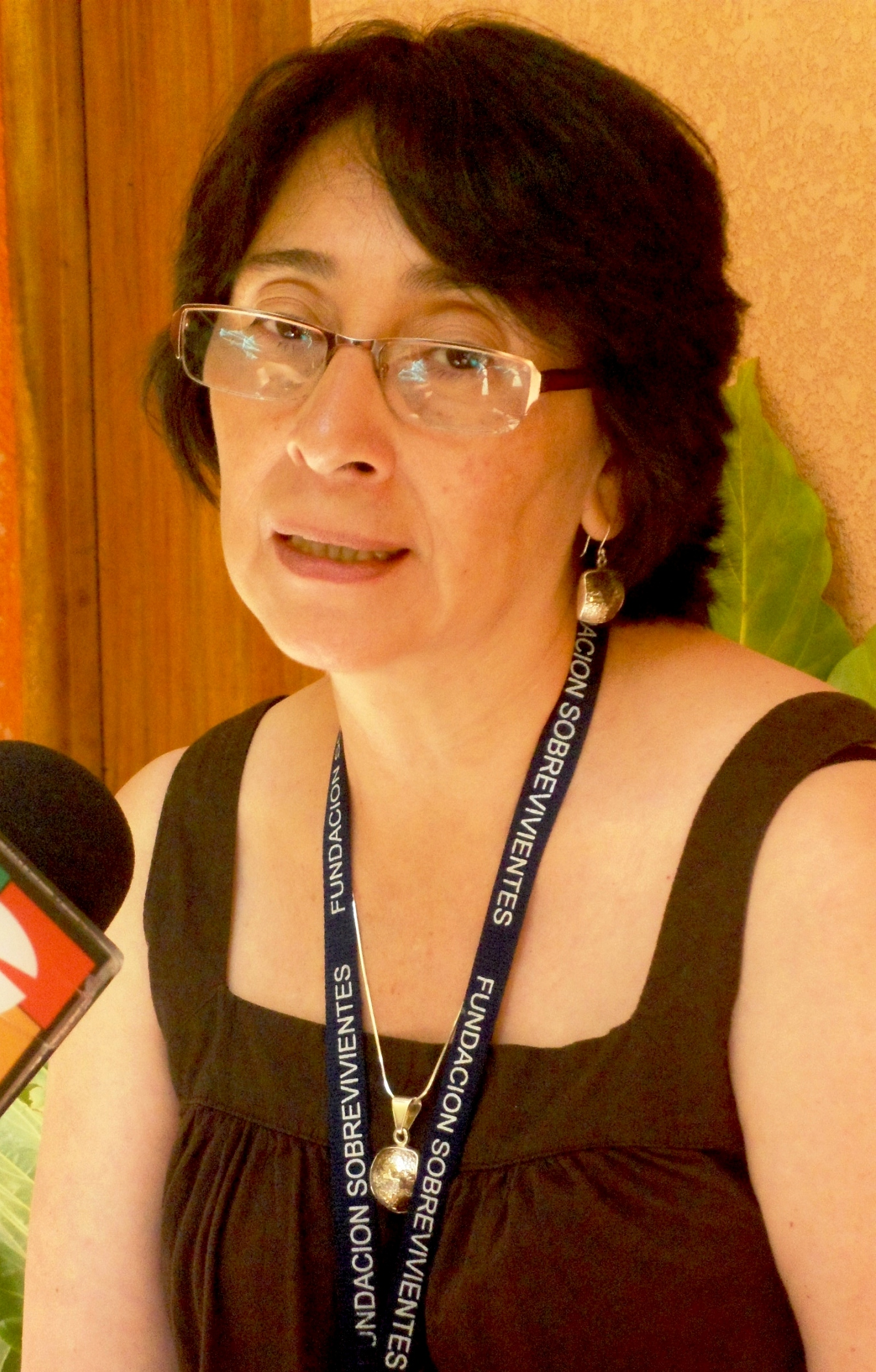
- Occupation: Human rights activist
- Organization: Foundation Sobrevivientes
- Awards: International Women of Courage Award (2009); Chevalier of the Legion of Honor (2011)

Norma Angélica Cruz Córdova is a Guatemalan human rights activist known for her work documenting violence against women.

== Career ==
Norma Cruz is a woman human rights defender. Her work defending human rights includes heading the Fundación Sobrevivientes (Survivors' Foundation), a Guatemala City-based women's rights organization, since its opening on 3 July 1996. This foundation seeks to provide "emotional, social, and legal support to hundreds of female victims seeking justice and protection." According to the US Department of State, "in 2007 alone, her foundation helped find, prosecute and convict 30 individuals accused of murdering women. The NGO runs a victims’ shelter — one of only a handful in the country — and also fights to protect mothers whose babies are stolen as the first link in an illegal and lucrative supply chain for international adoptions."

In Spring 2011, Boston's American Repertory Theater and System of a Down's Serj Tankian dedicated their production of Prometheus Bound to Cruz and seven other activists, stating in program notes that "by singing the story of Prometheus, the God who defied the tyrant Zeus by giving the human race both fire and art, this production hopes to give a voice to those currently being silenced or endangered by modern-day oppressors."

== Threats ==
Since May 2009, Norma Cruz has been subject to repeated threats of rape and murder by text message and phone; her family has also reported threats. Though the Guatemalan government has provided her with police protection, the threats have reportedly continued, leading Amnesty International to name her work a "priority case" in 2011. In March 2011, her organization's offices were damaged by a Molotov cocktail, though no one was hurt in the attack.

== Awards and honors ==
In 2009, the US Department of State named Cruz an International Woman of Courage, stating that Cruz served as "an inspiration and symbol of courage and hope to women in Guatemala and women everywhere who are working for positive change." She received the award from US Secretary of State Hillary Clinton and First Lady Michelle Obama.
