= Nicolasa Machaca =

Bolivian activist and unionist

Nicolasa Machaca Alejandro (born 1952) is a Bolivian union leader and health care worker.

A child of indigenous Quechua farmworkers, Machaca learned to read and became a literacy advocate. She coordinated community aid efforts and worked to empower women through forming mothers' clubs. In 1980, she was involved in the founding of the Bartolina Sisa Confederation, the primary union organization of peasant women in Bolivia. Later that year, she was imprisoned and tortured for her social activism, and she was forced to flee the country. After a stay in Cuba, she returned to Bolivia and studied to become a paramedic.

In 2005, she was nominated for a Nobel Peace Prize as part of PeaceWomen Across the Globe's initiative to nominate a group of 1,000 women for that year's honor.

== Biography ==
Nicolasa Machaca Alejandro was born in 1952 in the Bolivian municipality of Poopó. She grew up in a farming family, which raised sheep and cows and planted potatoes and fava beans. Machaca did not begin school until age 10, and she was bullied for being so much older than her classmates, so she dropped out shortly after enrolling. However, a few years later, she learned to read and began leading literacy courses in her community. She also became involved in the community's Mothers' Club, although she was not yet a mother herself.

Machaca began meeting provincial leaders and forming a network there, and in 1974 she represented Kurawara, her ayllu (indigenous community), at the Congress of Peasant Women in Oruro.

In 1977, Machaca left Kurawara and settled in Oruro, having been chosen to oversee programs for women in her province.

In 1980, she came to be considered a threat to the regime of Luís García Meza, and one night she was taken by military forces and imprisoned in the Oruro jail. After two months of imprisonment, interrogation, and torture, in early 1981 Machaca's body was thrown in the cab of a truck and she was brought to Obispo Santistevan Province, where they left her. She managed to find another truck to bring her to La Paz. She took refuge in the house of a fellow activist, who found a doctor and helped her flee the country. She traveled to Cuba via Lima, and in Havana she was brought to the hospital. Her condition was critical, and it was feared that she would have to have both legs amputated, but the doctors managed to save them.

Machaca stayed in Cuba for a year and a half, returning to Bolivia after García Meza was ousted. She continued her activist work and worked for Radio Pío XII in Oruro. In 1985, she enrolled in the Instituto Politécnico Tomás Katari, graduating as a paramedic. She went on to lead projects at that institution to bring medical staff to remote communities.

As a founding member of the Bartolina Sisa Confederation, Machaca continued her union activism, but she paired it with work on social services.

She was among the 1,000 women nominated by PeaceWomen Across the Globe for the 2005 Nobel Peace Prize.

In 2011, she was named the first president of the "Juana Azurduy" Social Organization of Quechua Women, which aims to empower women in peri-urban neighborhoods of Sucre.

== Personal life ==
In 1991, she married Benjamín Cuéllar, whom she met during her work providing medical services to communities in Potosí Department. The couple moved to Sucre, where they raised their three children: Rosa, Ernesto, and Carmen Julia.

== Bibliography ==
- Machaca, Nicolasa. (1999). Nicolasa Machaca : una mujer que desafió a su destino. SNV. OCLC 84838628.
