= Kongdeuane Nettavong =

- Born: 6 July 1947; Xiangkhouang
- Occupation: Writer, librarian
- Employer: National Library of Laos

Kongdeuane Nettavong (born 6 July 1947) is a Laotian librarian and author. She was Director of the National Library of Laos from 1989 until 2010.

Kongdeuane Nettavong was born in 1947 in Xiangkhouang Province. She graduated from Laval University in Quebec in 1970 with a bachelor's degree in geography and earned a master's degree in archival studies in Paris in 1974. After teaching history and geography at the Teachers Training College in Vientiane, she became deputy director of the Museum and Archeology Department at the National Library of Laos.

At the National Library, Nettavong oversaw the Preservation of Lao Manuscripts Programme (PLMP), which to preserve and digitize over hundreds of thousands of palm leaf and mulberry tree paper manuscripts in Lao and Pali from hundreds of Laotian temples and monasteries. In conjunction with the PLMP, she organized the 2004 Conference on the Literary Heritage of Laos.

She also established the Archives of Traditional Music in Laos (ATML), which preserves and documented traditional Laotian music. Nettavong herself is an accomplished player of the khaen, the traditional Lao mouth organ, and author of a book on khaen music, Mon saneh siang khaen phaen din koet (2018).

She is the author and co-author of a number of other books, including Lao Folktales (2008).

== Bibliography ==
- (editor) The literary heritage of Laos: preservation, dissemination, and research perspectives, Vientiane: National Library of Laos, 2005.
- (with Wajuppa Tossa) Lao folktales, Westport, 2008
- Mon saneh siang khaen phaen din koet, Vientiane: Lansang Media, 2018
