= Siham Daoud Anglo =

Sudanese Human Right activist (born 1961)

- Born: 1960 (age 65–66); Sudan
- Occupation: Activist

Siham Daoud Anglo (Arabic: سهام داوود born in 1960) is a Sudanese Human Rights activist in community development and peace building.

Anglo was among 16 Sudanese women nominated for their efforts in Peace building in Sudan, and mentioned together with the 1000 women proposed for the Nobel Peace Prize in 2005. Anglo profile picture was one of the three women on the book cover featuring 1000 women form the global.

In 1987, Anglo took the initiative of assisting the displaced women in the Sudan. She established a training center that generates women's labor skills in many work areas. She began the work from her own house, which put a lot of pressure on her family. Anglo initiated this project to support displaced Nubian women, women from other tribes, and their families in the Zagalona area Omduramn. The project was started by teaching women crafting and fabric dying and Sewing and "Tie-Dye” in 1994, about 180 women have completed their training and their new skills serves as medium of livelihood for their families.

The illiteracy fighting classes by Anglo's center has helped many women in Sudan to read and write. Anglo actively participated in the Nuba Mountains Women for Peace (NMWP) in 1998.

== Work ==
Anglo through Sudanese women for peace involved in building capacity of women and helped them to make peace building efforts.

Through Angalo work with women in the Zag Rags Center she trained hundred of women on sewing and crafting enable them to have income.

Anglo speech at the Deir Ezzor Council Conference.

“Our conference was a symbol of hope and peace, and witnessed the declaration of a new dawn of democracy and transparency in Syria, and the rising of the sun of freedom, illuminating the paths of the future with the light of justice and equality, as the voices and hands of the Deir Ezzor Council were united under a roof of determination and resolve, and the new leadership was chosen with a strong will and hearts filled with hope.”

— Logofs-party.com, Siham Daou : Our conference was a symbol of hope and peace and witnessed the declaration of a new dawn for democracy and transparency in Syria
