= María Reinat-Pumarejo =

Puerto Rican peace activist

María Reinat-Pumarejo is a Puerto Rican peace and anti-racism activist.

== Biography ==
María Reinat-Pumarejo was born in Aguadilla, Puerto Rico in a working-class family. After her parents' divorce, she was adopted into a family of similar background and started to work at the age of 14. Her first education is a bachelor's degree of arts in socials sciences (mainly concentrated in history) at the University of Puerto-Rico. After receiving a degree, she moved to the state of Massachusetts with her daughter Saraivy. Despite the fact, that she had to work at three jobs to support her family, she became a master of arts in education and counselling psychology from the University of Massachusetts. Her work as an activist started in 1988 when she became a participant of Casa Latina where she worked on increasing voter registration in Northampton, Massachusetts. In 1992 María Reinat Pumajero cofound the Institute for Latino Empowerment. In 1997, after the birth of her son Gabriel Hatuey, she decided to return to Puerto-Rico.

" I had been living there for 10 years and I got pregnant. I thought that I was going to raise a child again, and that again he was going to be part of an education system which is biased in favour of white people and which has internalized prejudices towards Latinos. In the end, the decision to come back was very clear.”

There she continued her work as a peace-activist and participated in a campaign against usage the island of Vieques as a bombing range and testing ground by US Navy. The campaign ended in May 2003 with demilitarization of the island and its designation as a National Wildlife Refuge.

She is the cofounder of the ILE, later evolved into Colectivo Ilé, an anti-racist collective of woman in Puerto Rico, (the Institute for Latino Empowerment) and core trainer at the PISAB (People's Institute for Survival and Beyond). She is a director of Colectivo Ilé: Organizers for Consciousness-in-Action committed to anti-oppression in Puerto-Rico and US, the ILE, the establisher of Undoing Racism Organizing Committee in Western Massachusetts, lector at the University of the Sacred Heart and a member of International Women Against Militarism Network. She regularly speaks on the limitations of the census questions that require people to select a single race, and does not allow multiple races as an answer.

== Articles ==
María Reinat-Pumarejo is co-author and collaborator of several works about anti-racism and women rights:

- Resistance, Resilience and Respect for Human Rights: Women Working Across Borders for Peace and Genuine Security by Ellen-Rae Cachola, Gwyn Kirk, Lisalinda Natividad, María Reinat Pumarejo, 2009
- ‘Pulling Up Myths from the Root:’ Designing and Implementing an Anti-Racist Curriculum About the African Heritage for Third Graders in Puerto Rico, 2009
- Guide to anti-racist teaching of African heritage in Puerto Rico, 2009.
- Women Warriors of the Afro-Latina Diaspora, 2012.
- Palenque: Puerto Rican anthology of black, antiracist, Africanist and Afro-descendant themes: narrative and poetry, 2013.
- Fair conversation about racism and racial and gender privileges in Puerto Rico, 2019.

== Awards ==
In 2005 she was nominated for the Nobel Peace Prize as one of the 1000 Women for Peace.

María Reinat-Pumarejo received a City of Guernica 2006 Award for Peace and Reconciliation and Martin Luther King, Jr. Roundtable 2016 Medal of Honor for her anti-racist and solidarity work in Puerto Rico.
