= Mariani Dimaranan =

Filipino nun and activist (1925–2005)

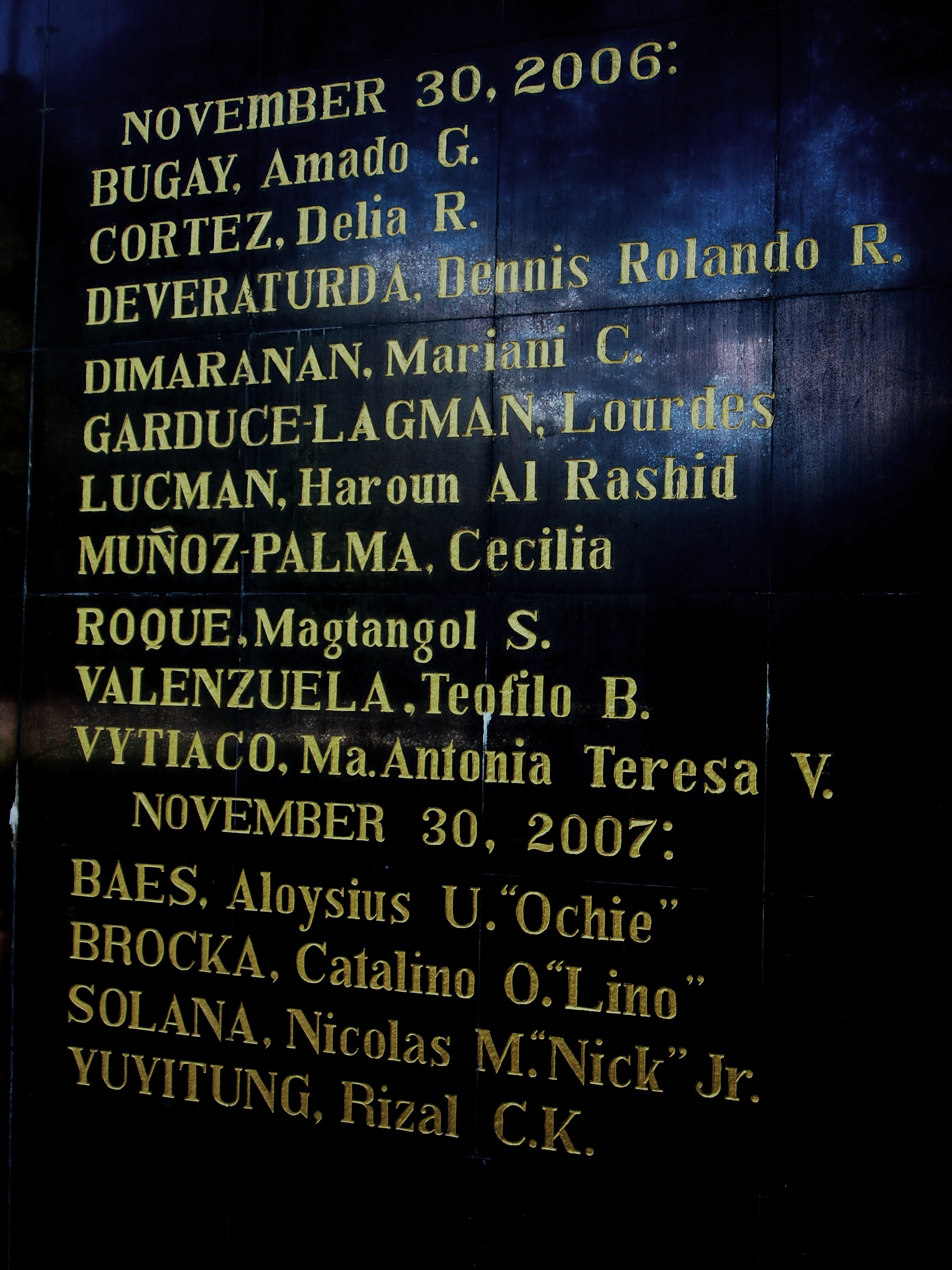
- Detail of the Wall of Remembrance at the Bantayog ng mga Bayani, showing names from the 2006 batch of Bantayog Honorees, including that of Mariani Dimaranan.
- Church: Roman Catholicism
- Archdiocese: Manila

Personal details
- Born: February 1, 1925 Lubang, Mindoro, Philippine Islands
- Died: December 17, 2005 (aged 80) Quezon City, Philippines

Mariani Cuevas Dimaranan, S.F.I.C. (February 1, 1925 – December 17, 2005) was a Catholic nun and activist in the Philippines who fought against the dictatorship of Ferdinand Marcos.

Dimaranan headed Task Force Detainees of the Philippines, created in the early years of martial law in the Philippines by the Association of Major Religious Superiors of the Philippines to investigate and document human rights abuses.

She became a political detainee in 1973 after she was accused of being a communist. She was also accused of writing articles against Marcos. Dimaranan denied the charges against her.

Her name is inscribed on the Bantayog ng mga Bayani Wall of Remembrance, a memorial that honors martyrs and heroes who fought the dictatorship.
