= Adélaïde Charlier =

Belgian climate activist (born 2000)

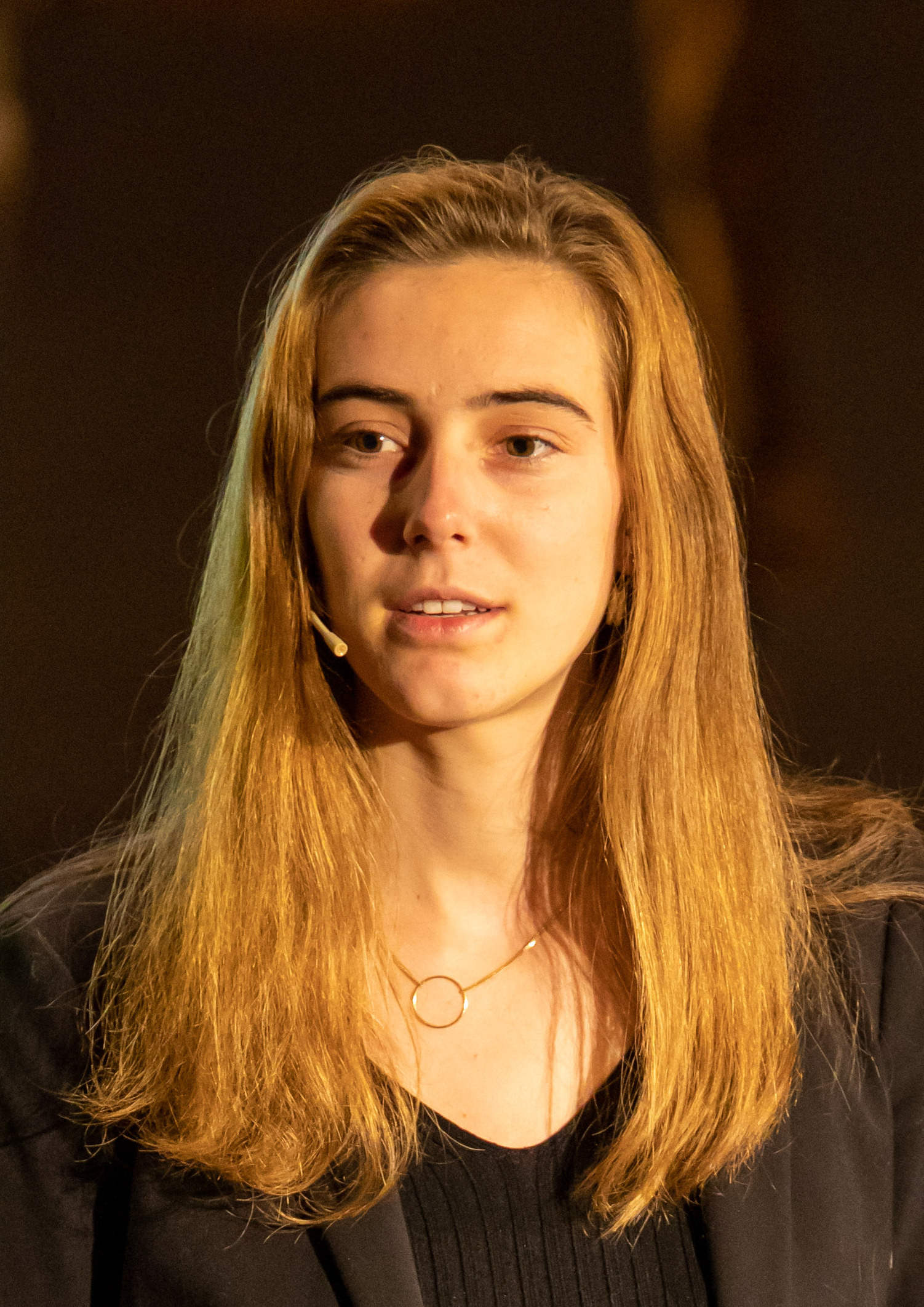
- Born: 9 December 2000 (age 25); Namur, Belgium
- Education: United Nations International School of Hanoi (2012–2016) Collège Notre-Dame de la Paix (2016–2019) Vrije Universiteit Brussel (from September 2020)
- Occupation: Climate activist
- Known for: Youth for Climate

Adelaide Charlier (born 9 December 2000) is a Belgian activist fighting for climate and social justice. She co-founded the Youth for Climate movement in Belgium. She is mainly known for her involvement in the fight against climate change. Inspired by the actions of Greta Thunberg, she is one of the leading figures, alongside Kyra Gantois and Anuna De Wever, of the first school strikes for climate in Belgium.

== Biography ==
Charlier was born on 9 December 2000, in Namur.

In 2018, she co-founded the Youth for Climate movement in Belgium with the aim of raising awareness and encouraging young people to act against climate change. Since then, she has organized several climate marches and protests and has been present in the media to talk about global warming and social justice.

Between 2018 and 2019, she became the French-speaking Belgian representative for Amnesty International.

Since 2020, she has been a student in Political & Social Sciences at Vrije Universiteit Brussel (VUB) and at Ghent University (UGent).

Adélaïde is also passionate about sports: she was part of the swimming team at the United Nations International School of Hanoi and regularly practices triathlon.

== Activism ==
=== Ecological awareness ===
Charlier became aware of the climate cause in her early teens, while living with her family in Vietnam. From 2012 to 2016, she attended the United Nations International School of Hanoi, a United Nations school where the climate issue was particularly discussed.

=== Student strike for the climate ===
As the Youth for Climate "climate strikes" began in Flanders under the initiative of activists Anuna De Wever and Kyra Gantois, Charlier was asked to extend the mobilization to Wallonia. She quickly became one of the spokespersons and figures of the movement. At the time, she was still a student at Collège Notre-Dame de la Paix (Namur).

=== COP25 - Atlantic Crossing ===
In October 2019, Charlier crossed the Atlantic Ocean by sailboat to attend the COP25 in Santiago, Chile, accompanied by other activists such as Anuna De Wever. During their journey, they learned that Chilean President Sebastian Piñera had decided to cancel the COP25, following a severe social crisis in the country.

== Documentaries ==
=== La Meuf du climat ("The Climate Girl") ===
In 2021, the RTBF produced "La Meuf du climat", a 52-minute documentary dedicated to Charlier. Directed by Quentin Ceuppens, the documentary portrays the young woman from Namur by interviewing her close friends, family, scientists, and Greta Thunberg, who has become one of her best friends.

=== Sœurs de combat ===
Charlier appears in the documentary "Sœurs de combat", a film about youth engagement in favour of the climate, directed by Henri De Gerlache. The film was broadcast by the RTBF.

=== I Am Greta ===
In 2020, Charlier appeared in the documentary by Nathan Grossman, I am Greta.

== Awards and honors ==
In September 2019, Charlier was awarded the Medal of Walloon Merit by the Walloon government, on the occasion of the Fêtes de Wallonie. She is decorated by Willy Borsus, Vice-President of Wallonia.

In January 2020, she received the "Namuroise of the Year" award in the "Commitment to the Planet" category, for her leadership in climate marches.

In February 2022, the Lobby Awards 2021 granted her the title of "Female Leadership of the Year".

== Publications ==
Charlier is a co-author of the book "Quel monde pour demain, dialogue entre générations" (2020) with Esmeralda of Belgium, Anuna De Wever, and Sandrine Dixson-Declève. The book addresses climate issues in the form of a dialogue and proposes solutions for a more sustainable future.

== Notes and references ==
=== Related articles ===
- Future generations
- School Strike for Climate
- Youth for Climate
- Greta Thunberg
- Special Report on Global Warming of 1.5 °C
- Severn Cullis-Suzuki, teenager who delivered a speech at the 1992 Rio Summit
- Murray Bookchin
- Arne Næss
- Derrick Jensen (activist)
- Al Gore
