= Anuna De Wever =

Belgian climate activist

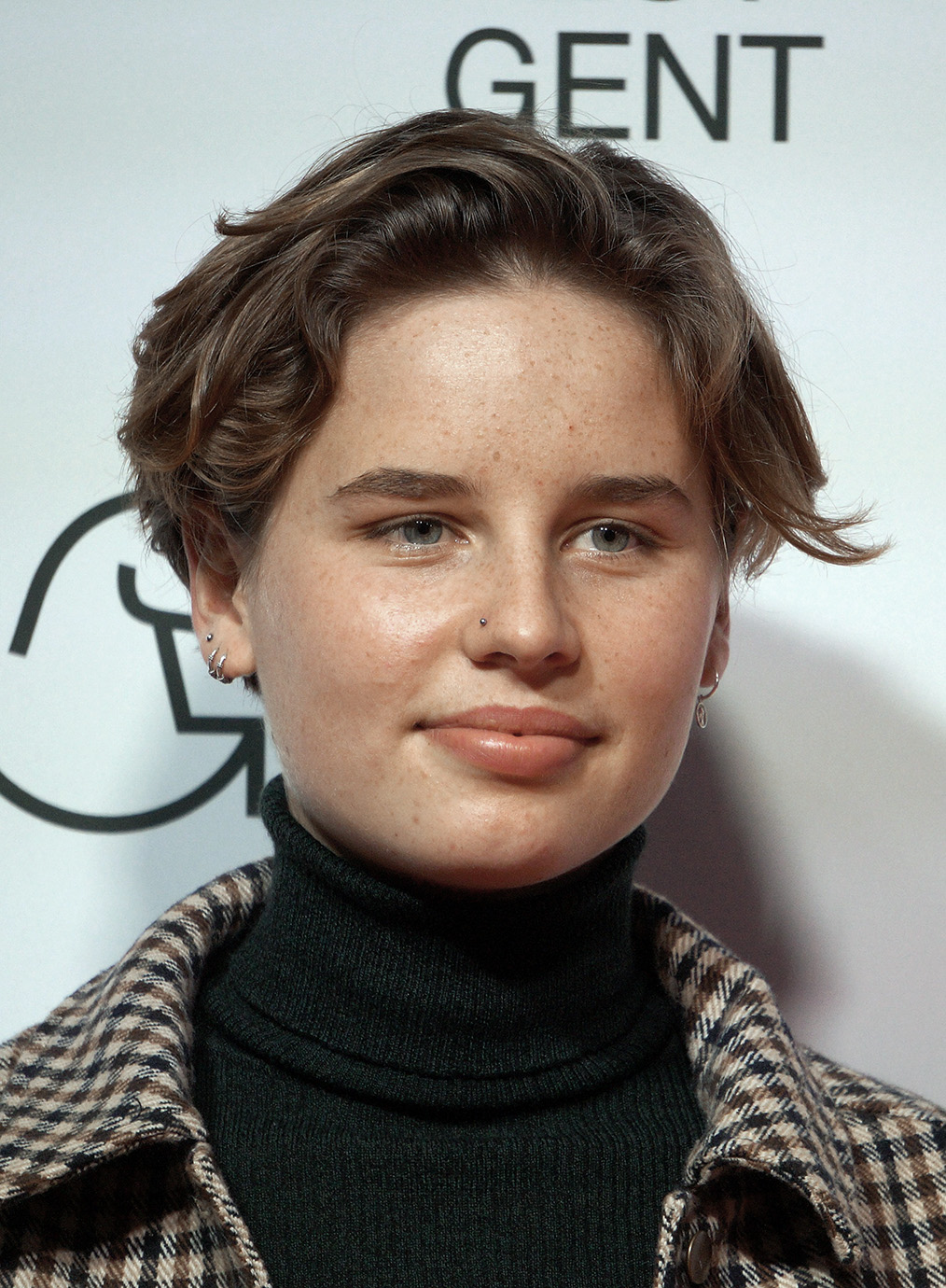
- Anuna De Wever in October 2020
- Born: 16 June 2001 (age 25); Mortsel, Belgium
- Known for: Fridays for Future

Anuna De Wever Van Der Heyden (born 16 June 2001) is a Belgian climate activist and was one of the leading figures in the Belgian branch of Fridays for Future.

== Early life and activism ==
De Wever was born in Mortsel, Belgium. With Kyra Gantois and Adélaïde Charlier, De Wever became one of the leading figures in the School strike for climate movement in Belgium. As a result, from February to May 2019 they had a weekly column in the magazine HUMO.

In the aftermath of the school strikes in Belgium, centre-right Flemish minister for the environment Joke Schauvliege was obliged to resign after falsely claiming that the Belgian State Security Service had information indicating that the climate strike was a political front organisation.

Personal differences led to a fissure within the Belgian Youth for Climate movement, with the departure of co-founder Kyra Gantois in August 2019.

De Wever made an appearance at the 2019 Pukkelpop music festival, attempting to engage the audience to call attention to the climate issues. This call angered some festival goers who harassed their group, hurled bottles of urine at them, and followed them back to their campsite, uttered death threats and destroyed their tent, forcing security to intervene. Because the attackers had been carrying a variant of the Flag of Flanders favoured by far-right elements of the Flemish Movement, the organizers banned such flags from the event, confiscating 20.

In October 2019, De Wever was among the youngest climate activists to set sail on the Regina Maris for a low-carbon trans-Atlantic journey to the 2019 United Nations Climate Change Conference in Santiago, Chile.

In February 2020, after returning from South America, they took an internship with the Greens–European Free Alliance in the European Parliament, without becoming a member of the party.

De Wever identifies as non-binary.

They received criticism for calling Gert Verhulst an "old white straight male", which prompted reply from the Belgian Secretary of State, Asylum and Immigration Sammy Mahdi who said: "Can we stop reducing a person's opinion to age, skin color, sexual orientation and gender?".

== Awards ==
- In May 2019, De Wever and Kyra Gantois jointly received the Ark Prize of the Free Word.
- In September 2019, De Wever and Adélaïde Charlier received Amnesty International Belgium's Ambassador of Conscience Award on behalf of Youth for Climate.
