= Global Day of Climate Action 2020 =

Worldwide protest for the climate

Global Day of Climate Action is a worldwide direct action protest that took place on 25 September 2020, organized by Fridays For Future and other active organizations, such as Youth for Climate and 350.org. This protest is as part of Fridays For Future activities, that aim at attracting world attention on the effect of climate change and to increase awareness regarding the rapid increase of global emissions and resources worldwide.

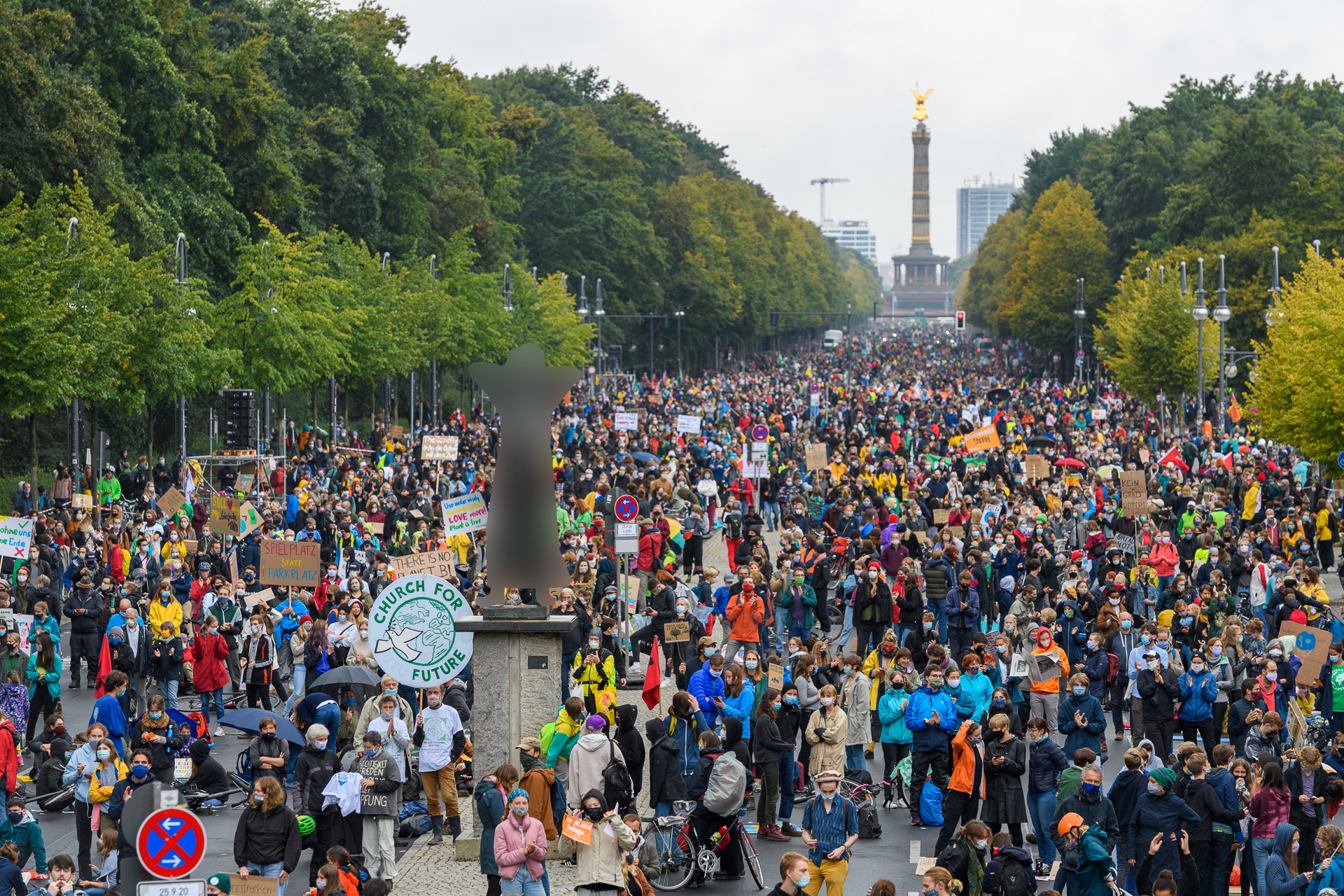
Protest in Berlin, 25 September 2020

Thousand of cities held events and demonstrations to urge concrete measures in the fight against the climate crisis, and protest for young people’s right to a future. According to the statistics of the event, the participants were as follows: 154 countries, 2362 cities, and 3615 events. However, it's claimed that the number of participants was restricted due to Covid rules.
