= Fridays for Future =

International youth movement for climate action

- Part of the climate movement
- Maximum number of school strikers per country: 1000 1000+ 10000+ 100000+ 1000000+
- Date: Since 20 August 2018, mostly on Fridays, sometimes on Thursdays, Saturdays or Sundays
- Location: International
- Caused by: Political inaction against global warming
- Goals: Climate justice
- Methods: Student strike
- Status: Active

Parties
Youth

Lead figures
| Greta Thunberg | |

Number
- 1.4 million (for 15 March 2019); 4 million (for 20 September 2019); 2 million (for 27 September 2019)

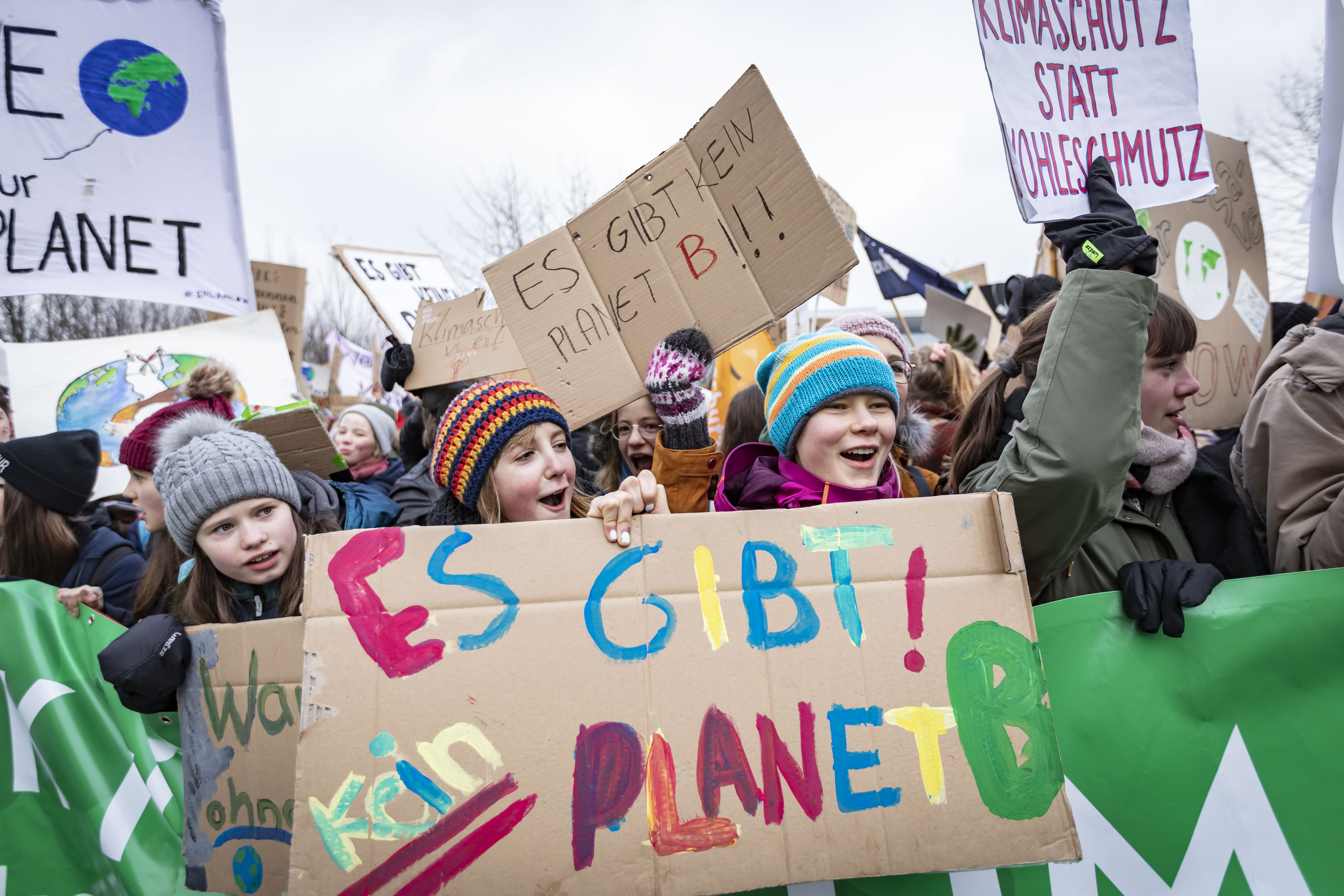
Children at a Fridays for Future protest in Germany, 2019

Fridays for Future (FFF), also known as the School Strike for Climate (Swedish: Skolstrejk för klimatet [ˈskûːlstrɛjk fœr klɪˈmɑ̌ːtɛt]), is an international movement of school students who skip Friday classes to participate in demonstrations to demand action from political leaders to prevent climate change and for the fossil fuel industry to transition to renewable energy. Publicity and widespread organising began after Swedish pupil Greta Thunberg staged a protest in August 2018 outside of the Swedish parliament, the Riksdag, holding a sign that read "Skolstrejk för klimatet" ("School strike for the climate").

A global strike on 15 March 2019 gathered more than one million strikers in 2,200 strikes organised in 125 countries. On 24 May 2019, in the second global strike, 1,600 protests across 150 countries drew hundreds of thousands of strikers. The May protests were timed to coincide with the 2019 European Parliament election.

The 2019 Global Week for Future was a series of 4,500 strikes across over 150 countries, focused around Friday 20 September and Friday 27 September. Likely the largest climate strikes in world history, the 20 September strikes gathered roughly 4 million protesters, many of them schoolchildren, including 1.4 million in Germany. On 27 September, an estimated two million people participated in demonstrations worldwide, including over one million protesters in Italy and several hundred thousand protesters in Canada.

== Earlier school climate strikes ==
In November 2006, the Australian Youth Climate Coalition was formed to organise climate change actions involving youth and school children. In 2010, in England there were school walkouts over climate change, linked to a Climate Camp. In late-November 2015, an independent group of students invited other students around the world to skip school on the first day of the 2015 United Nations Climate Change Conference in Paris. On 30 November, the first day of the conference, a "Climate strike" was organised in over 100 countries; over 50,000 people participated. The movement focused on three demands: 100% clean energy; keeping fossil fuels in the ground, and helping climate refugees.

== Greta Thunberg and beginnings, 2018 ==
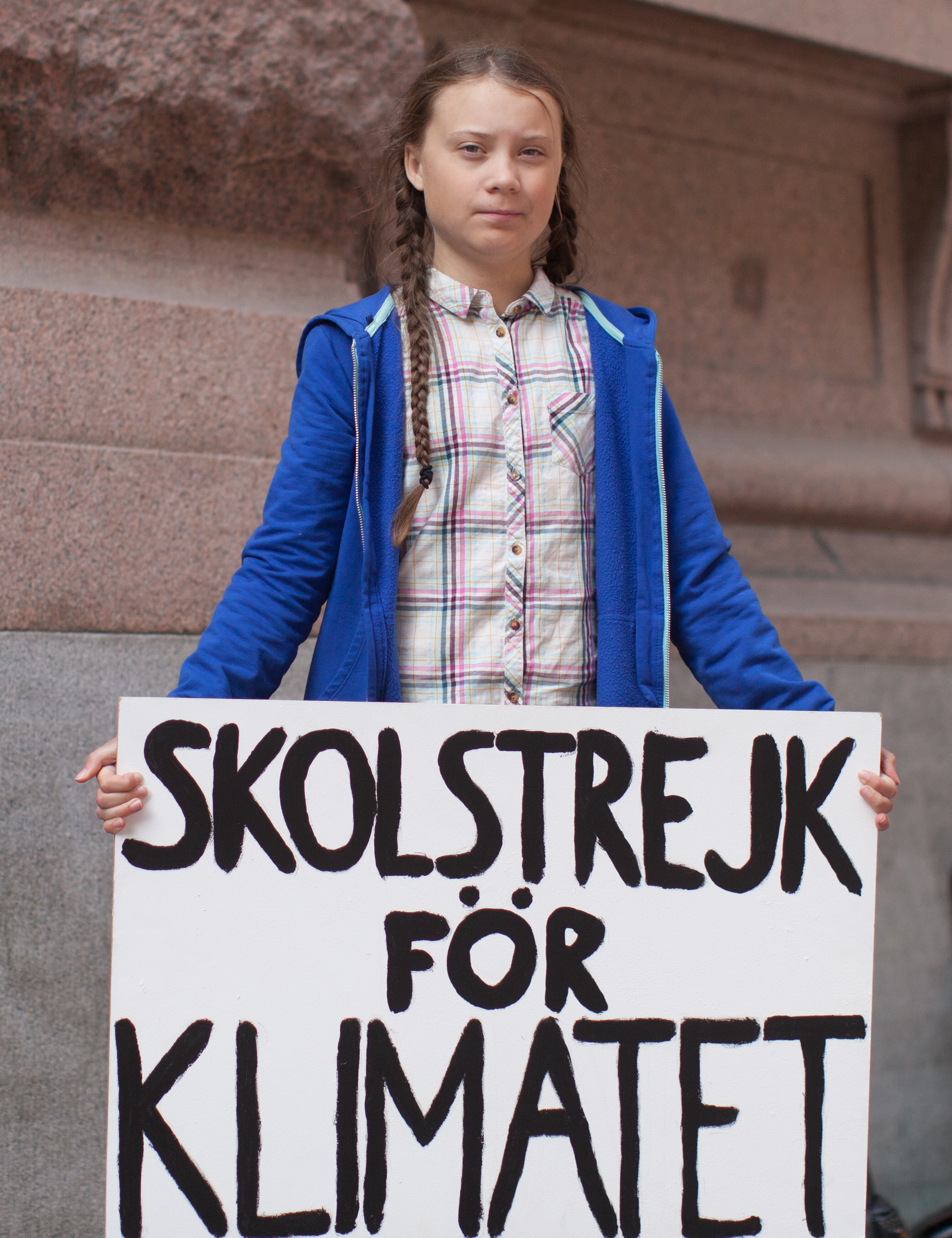
Greta Thunberg in front of the Swedish parliament in Stockholm, August 2018

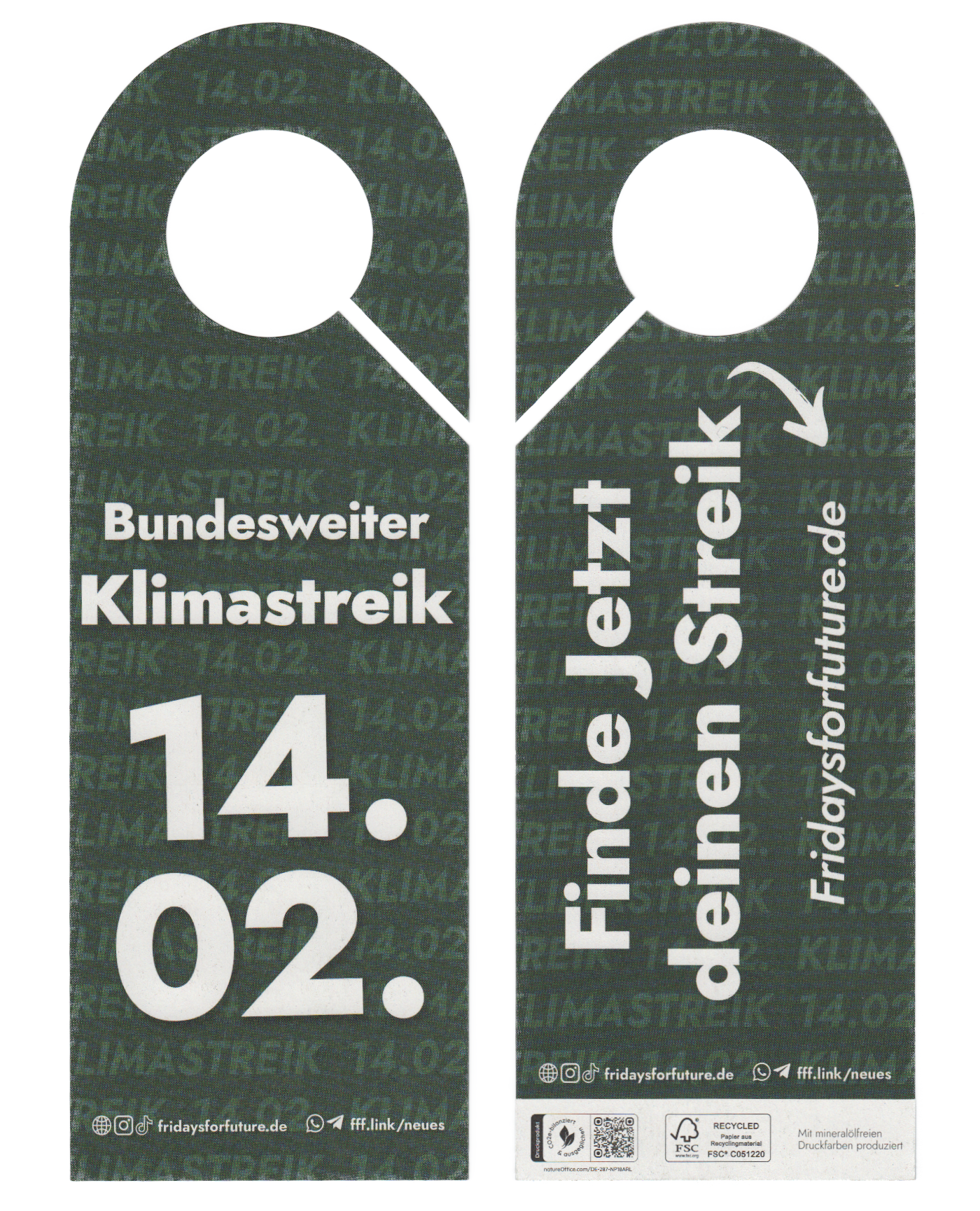
A door hanger promoting the German‑wide climate strike scheduled for 14 February 2025

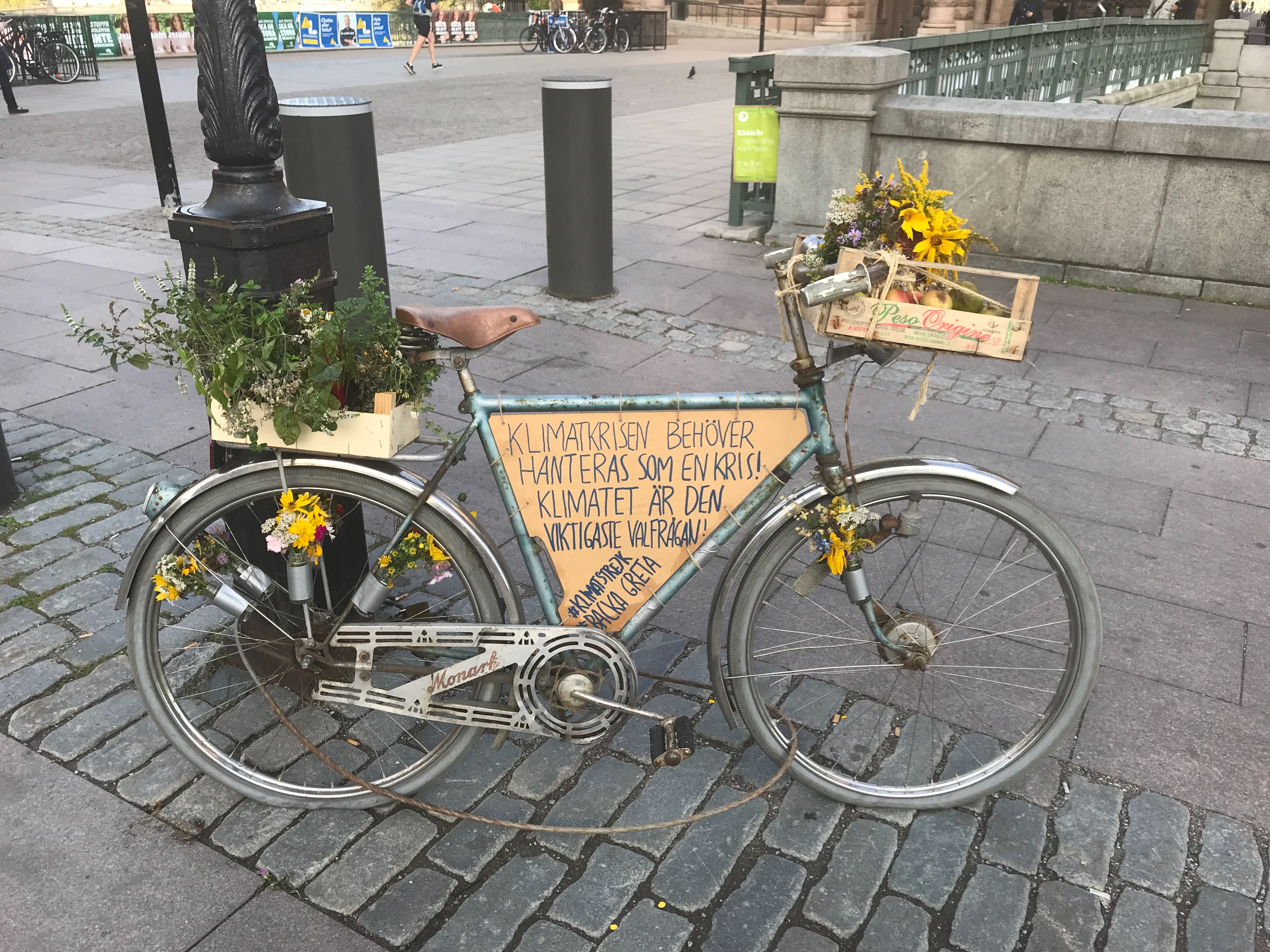
An activist's bicycle in Stockholm on 11 September 2018: "The climate change must be treated as a crisis! The climate is the most important election issue!"

On 20 August 2018, the Swedish climate activist Greta Thunberg, then in ninth grade, decided to not attend school until the 2018 Sweden general election on 9 September after heat waves and wildfires in Sweden. She has said she was inspired by the teen activists at Marjory Stoneman Douglas High School in Parkland, Florida, who organised the March for Our Lives. Thunberg protested by sitting outside the Riksdag every day during school hours with a sign that read "Skolstrejk för klimatet" ("school strike for the climate"). Among her demands were that the Swedish government reduce carbon emissions per the Paris Agreement. On 7 September, just before the general elections, she announced that she would continue to strike every Friday until Sweden aligns with the Paris Agreement. She coined the slogan Fridays for Future, which gained worldwide attention, and inspired school students across the globe to take part in student strikes.

School strikes for climate began to be organised around the world, inspired by Thunberg. The first strike to number more than one person took place in The Hague in September outside the Dutch parliament, led by Sandor van Gessel, Anne-Laure Stroek, Ianthe Minnaert and Ellis van der Borgh. In the days that followed, in Australia, thousands of students began to strike on Fridays, ignoring Prime Minister Scott Morrison's call for "more learning in schools and less activism". Galvanised by the COP24 Climate Change Conference in Katowice, Poland, strikes continued at least in 270 cities in December in countries including Australia, Austria, Belgium, Canada, the Netherlands, Germany, Finland, Denmark, Japan, Switzerland, the United Kingdom, and the United States.

== Growing movement, 2019 ==
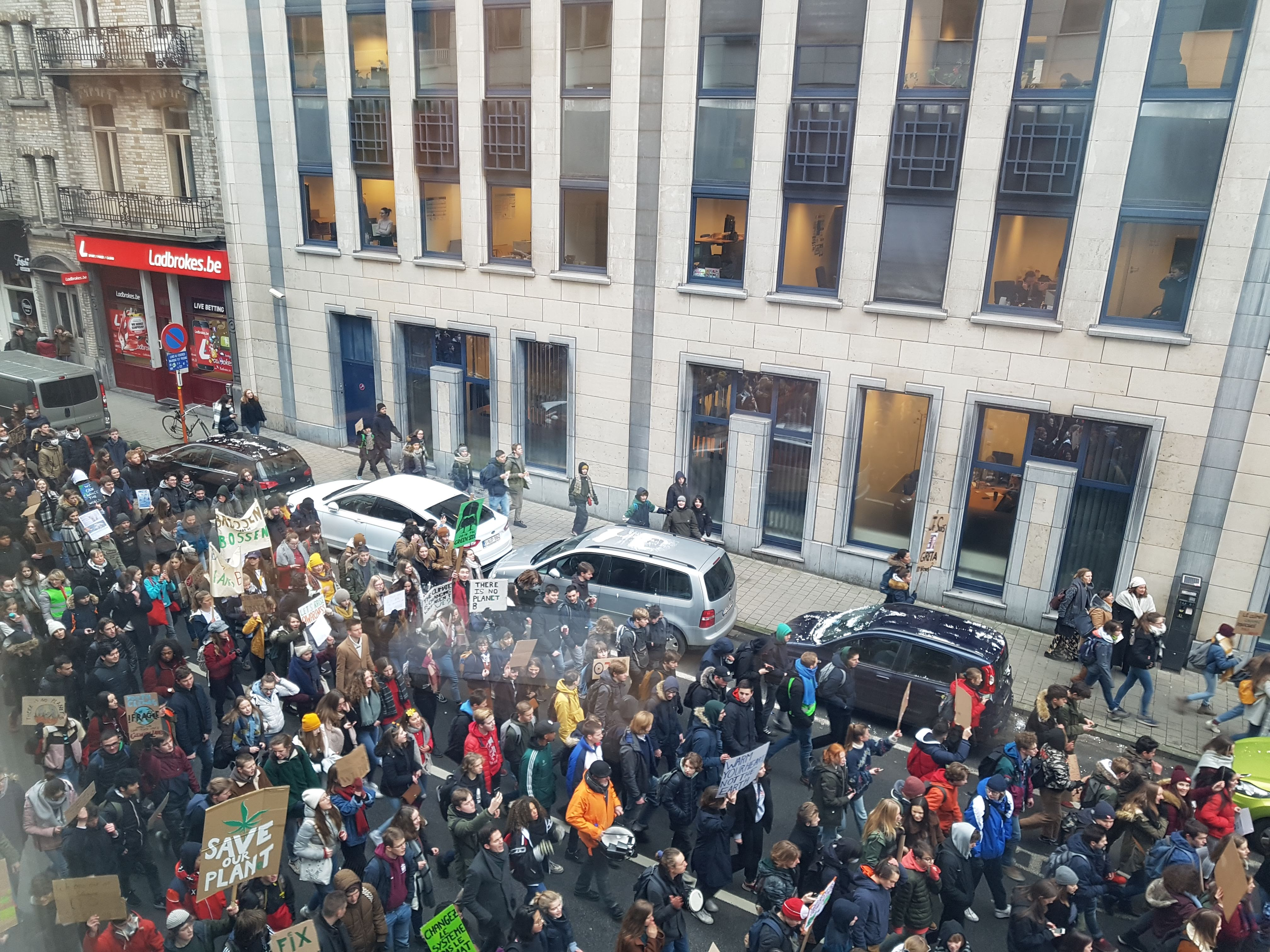
Brussels, 24 January 2019

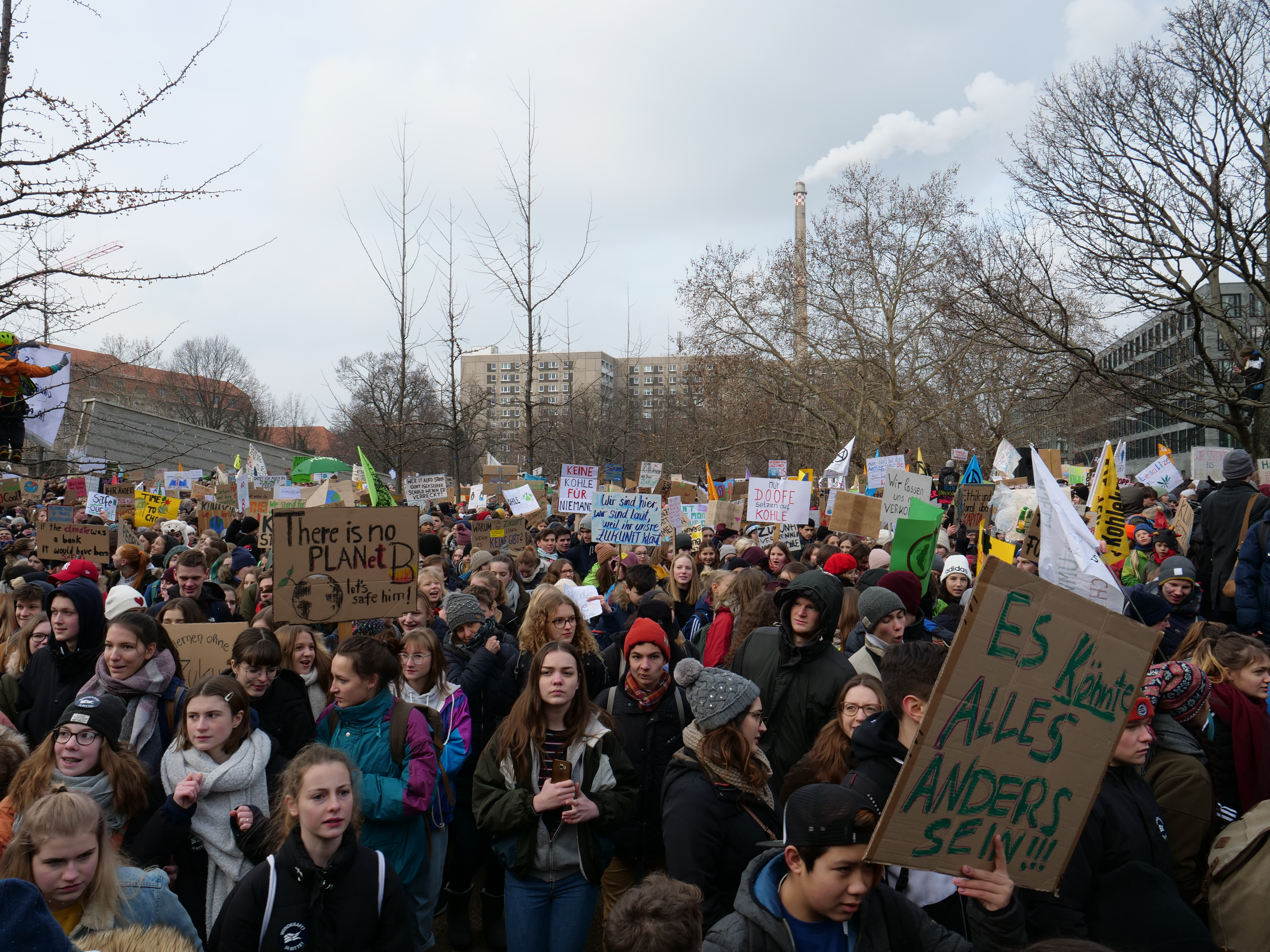
Climate strike in Berlin on 25 January 2019

In 2019, strikes were organised again in the countries listed above and in other countries, among them Colombia, New Zealand, and Uganda. Mass strikes took place on 17 and 18 January 2019, when at least 45,000 students protested in Switzerland and Germany alone, against insufficient policies on global warming. In several countries, including Germany and the UK, pupils demanded the change of laws to reduce the voting age to 16 so that they could influence public elections in favour of the youth.

In August 2019 Thunberg travelled to New York City on a two-week journey by sailboat to continue calling attention to the work needed to address the climate crisis. She participated in school strikes being planned in the United States on 20 September, and soon after she spoke at the UN Climate Summit on 23 September 2019, in New York City.

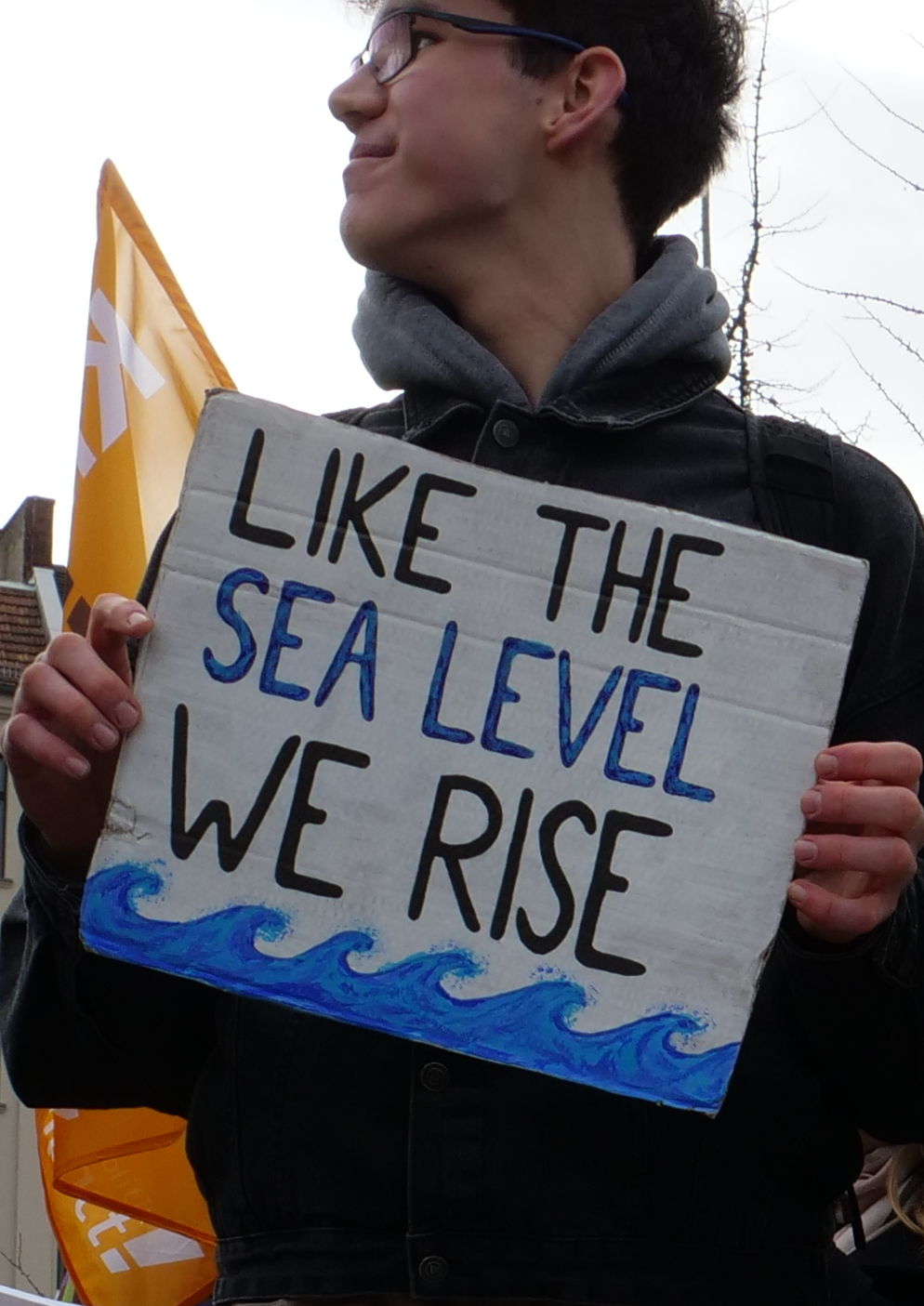
Protester with a placard at a rally at Invalidenpark, Berlin on 8 February 2019

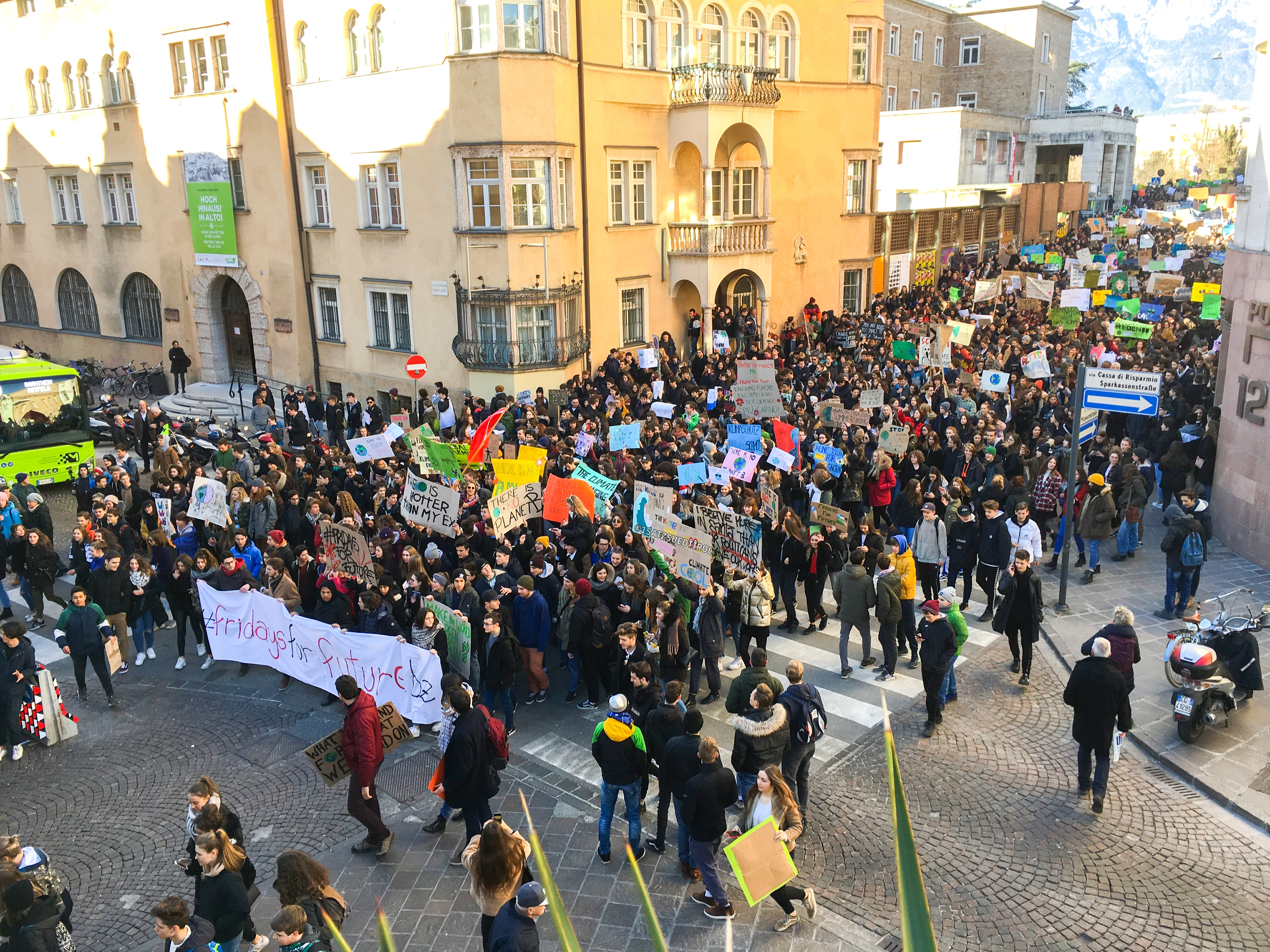
Bolzano, 15 February 2019

In Germany, regional groups were organised, communicating autonomously within WhatsApp groups and spreading their messages using flyers and social media. By February 2019, more than 155 local groups were counted by the movement. In United States, organizers coordinated on a state-by-state level and communicated autonomously within Slack groups and spreading their messages using flyers and social media. By February 2019, more than 134 groups were counted by the movement. The organisations Sunrise Movement, 350.org, OneMillionOfUs, Earth uprising, Future Coalition, Earth Guardians, Zero Hour, and Extinction Rebellion helped to coordinate.

The Belgian environment minister for Flanders, Joke Schauvliege, resigned on 5 February 2019 after falsely claiming the state security agency had evidence that the school strikes in Belgium were a "set‑up".

In the United Kingdom, on 13 February 2019, following open letters in support of the socio-political movement Extinction Rebellion in 2018, 224 academics signed an open letter giving their "full support to the students" attending the School Strike for Climate action. On Friday 15 February, more than 60 actions in towns and cities within the United Kingdom took place, with an estimated 15,000 strikers taking part.

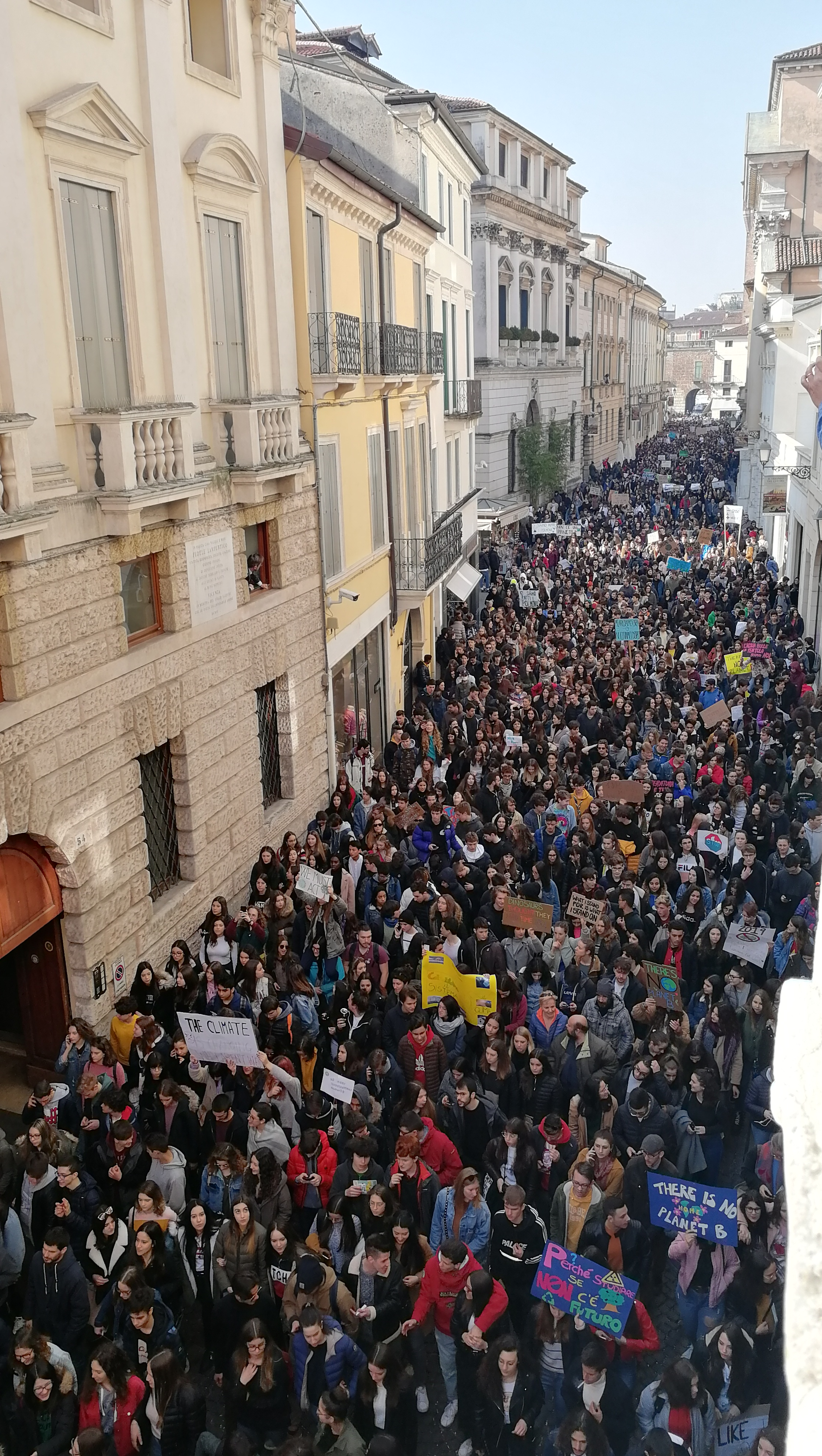
Vicenza, 15 March 2019

Climate scientist Stefan Rahmstorf, Potsdam Institute for Climate Impact Research, addressed a Fridays for Future climate strike in Potsdam, Germany that same day. On 21 February 2019, the President of the European Commission, Jean-Claude Juncker, stated his intent to spend hundreds of billions of euros on climate-change mitigation, amounting to a fourth of the EU budget. He announced this in a speech next to Greta Thunberg, and media credited the school-strike movement with provoking the announcement.

On 5 March 2019, 700 German-speaking researchers signed a statement in support of the school strikes in that country. Other researchers were invited to support the statement and it has been signed by over 26,800 scientists from mainly Germany, Austria and Switzerland.

On 9 May 2019, during a European Union summit in Sibiu, representatives of the movement from all over Europe met with several national leaders of European countries and handed them an open letter, which was signed by over 16,000 European climate strikers and their supporters.

=== Global Climate Strike for Future of 15 March 2019 ===
On 15 March 2019, a series of school strikes took place, urging adults to take responsibility and stop climate change. More than a million people demonstrated in about 2,200 events worldwide across 125 countries.

On 1 March 2019, 150 students from the global coordination group of the youth-led climate strike (of 15 March), including Thunberg, issued an open letter in The Guardian, saying:

We, the young, are deeply concerned about our future. [...] We are the voiceless future of humanity. We will no longer accept this injustice. [...] We finally need to treat the climate crisis as a crisis. It is the biggest threat in human history and we will not accept the world's decision-makers' inaction that threatens our entire civilisation. [...] Climate change is already happening. People did die, are dying and will die because of it, but we can and will stop this madness. [...] United we will rise until we see climate justice. We demand the world's decision-makers take responsibility and solve this crisis. You have failed us in the past. If you continue failing us in the future, we, the young people, will make change happen by ourselves. The youth of this world has started to move and we will not rest again.

In Scotland, city councils of Glasgow, Edinburgh, Highland and Fife gave permission for children to attend the strikes. In Finland parental consent letters were sent to schools and in the Finnish city of Turku the school board proclaimed that children had a constitutional right to take part in the strikes.

On the morning of 15 March in a Guardian guest editorial, titled "Think we should be at school? Today's climate strike is the biggest lesson of all", school-climate-strikers Thunberg, Anna Taylor, Luisa Neubauer, Kyra Gantois, Anuna De Wever, Adélaïde Charlier, Holly Gillibrand and Alexandria Villaseñor, reiterated their reasons for striking.

In Germany, more than 300,000 pupils demonstrated in 230 cities with more than 25,000 in Berlin alone. The striking students were supported by newly-founded initiative Parents for Future. In Italy more than 200,000 students demonstrated (100,000 in Milan according to the organisers). In Montreal more than 150,000 attended; Stockholm 15,000 to 20,000, Melbourne 30,000, Brussels 30,000, and Munich 8,000. Other cities included Paris, London, Washington, Reykjavík, Oslo, Helsinki, Copenhagen and Tokyo. In Antarctica, at least seven scientists held a supportive rally at the Neumayer Station III of Alfred Wegener Institute.

In New Zealand, the strikes were quickly overshadowed by Christchurch mosque shootings which took place the same day. The strike in Christchurch was abandoned for safety reasons, with students told to go home or otherwise shelter-in-place. The strikes continued in other New Zealand centres, many strikers oblivious to the shootings. One striker only learned of the shootings when she turned on the evening television news expecting to see the strikes as the top story.

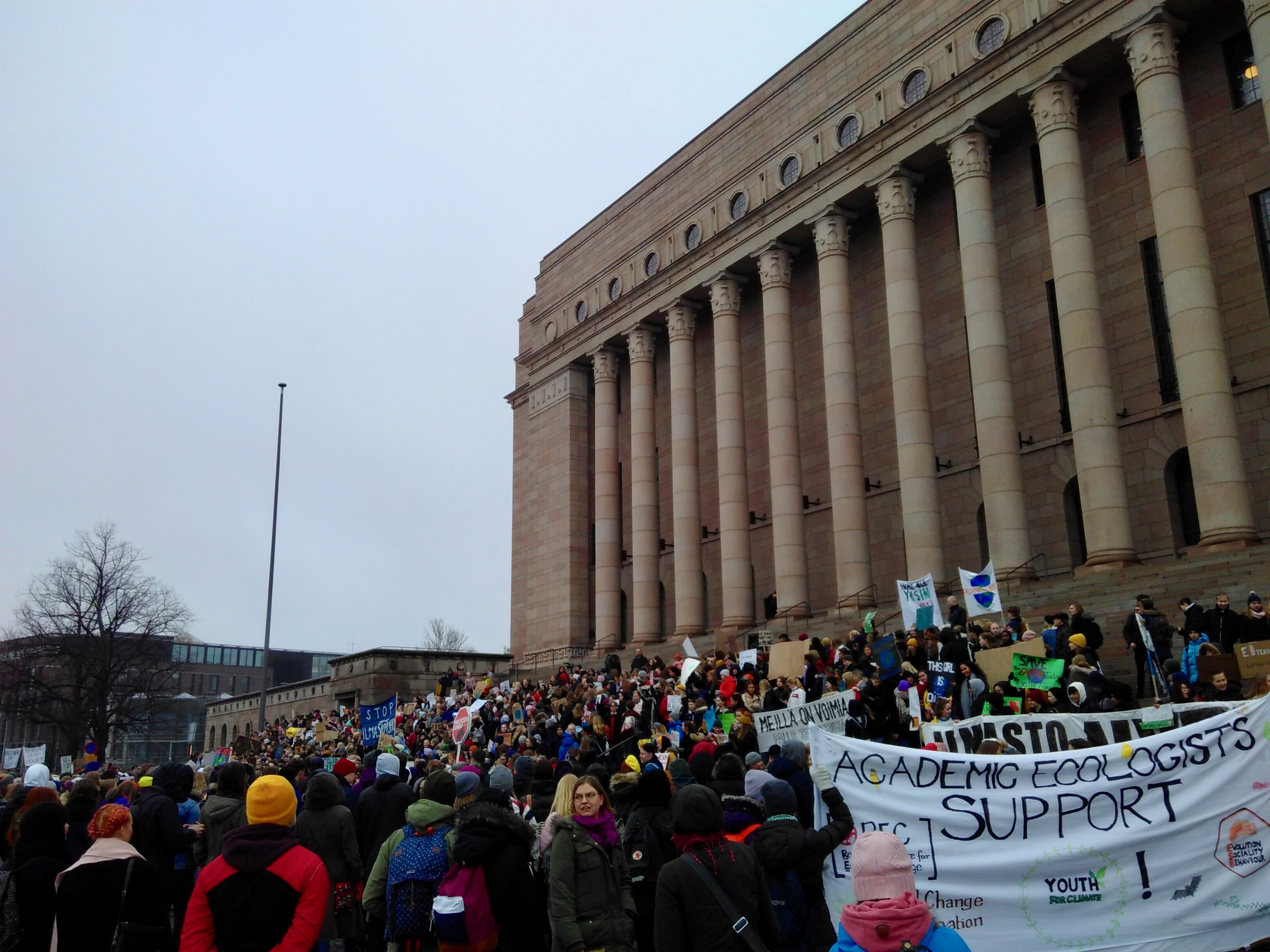
School Strike for Climate in front of the Parliament House, Helsinki, 15 March 2019

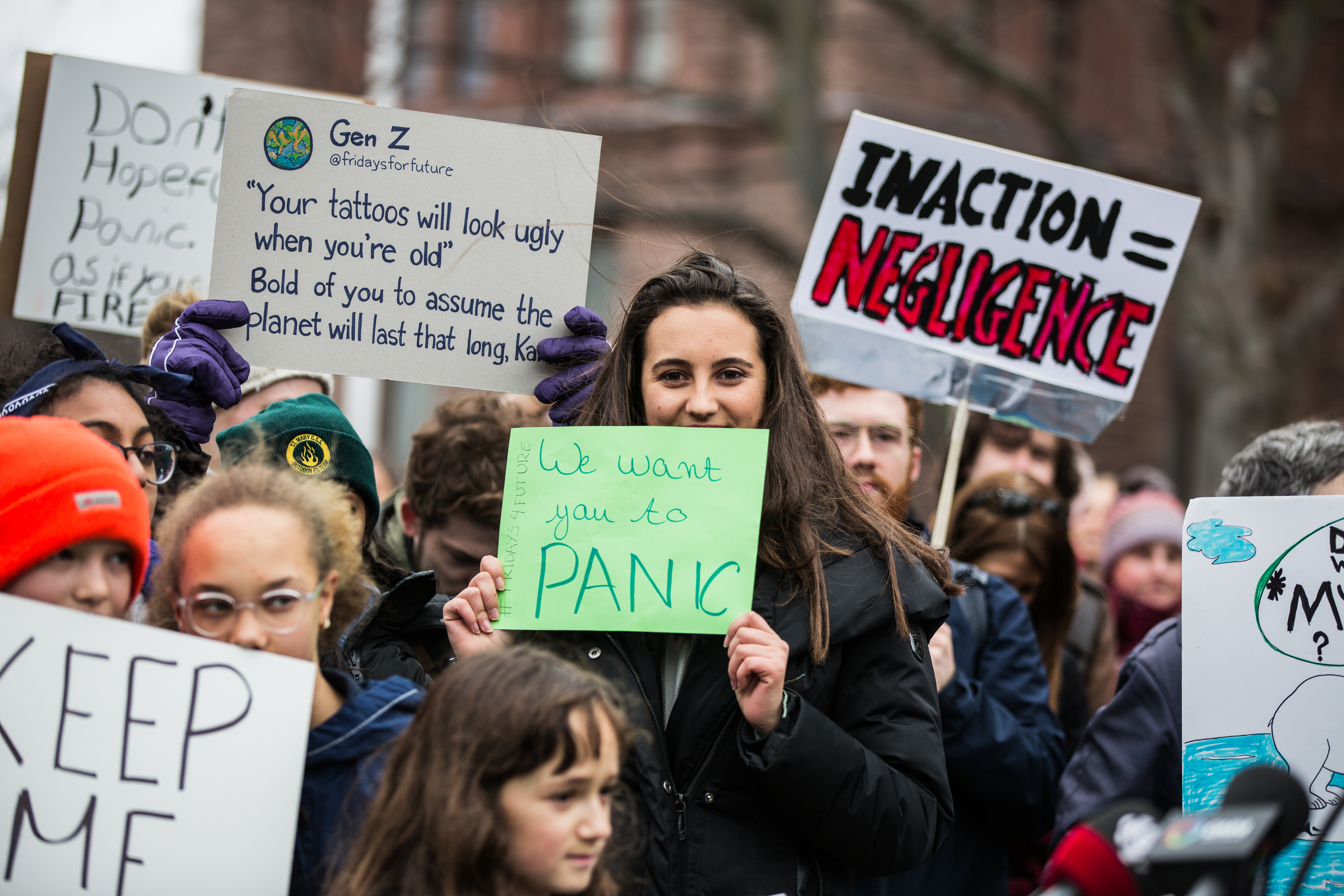
"Fridays for Future" 15 March Toronto

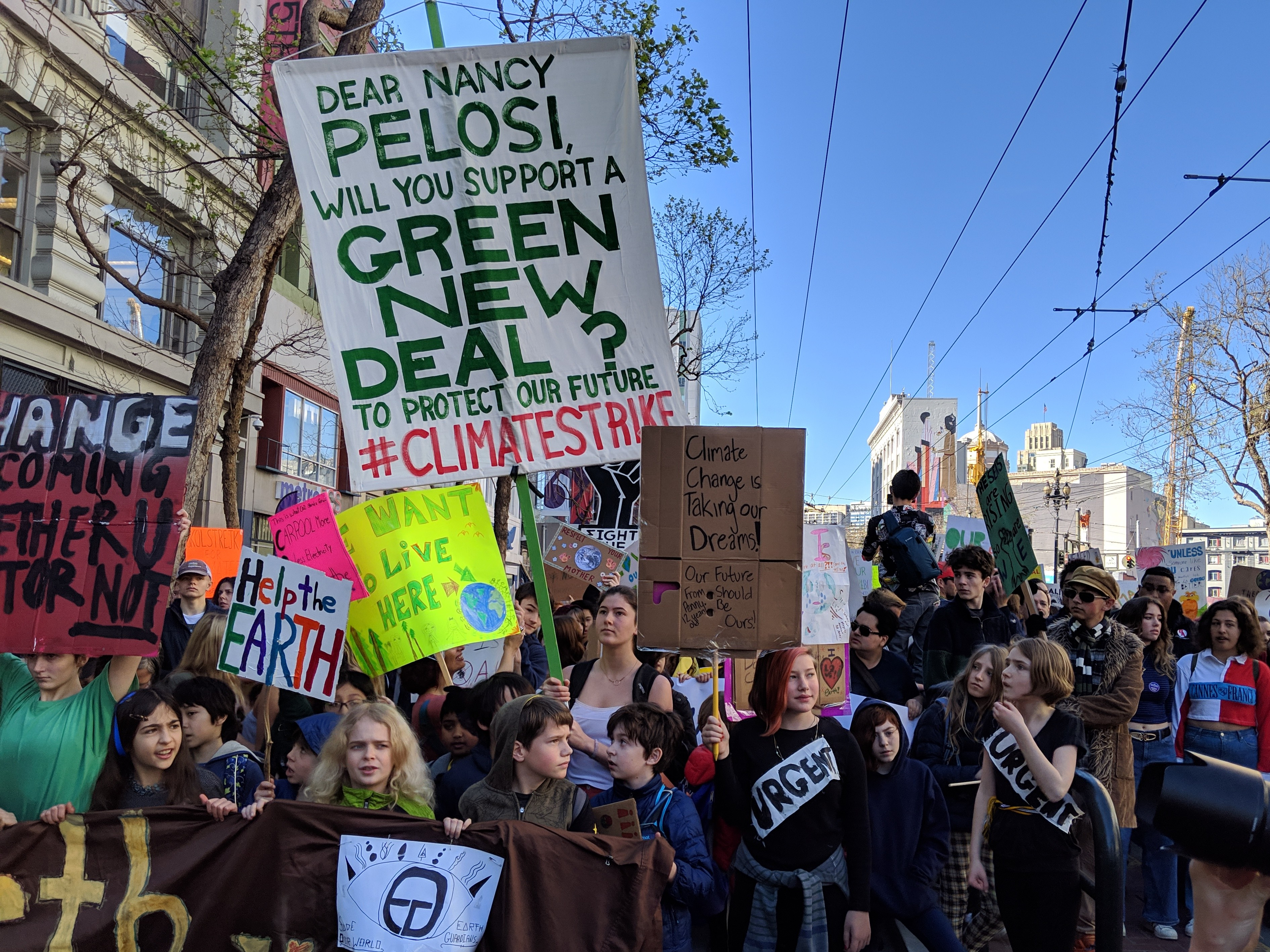
School strike in San Francisco on 15 March 2019

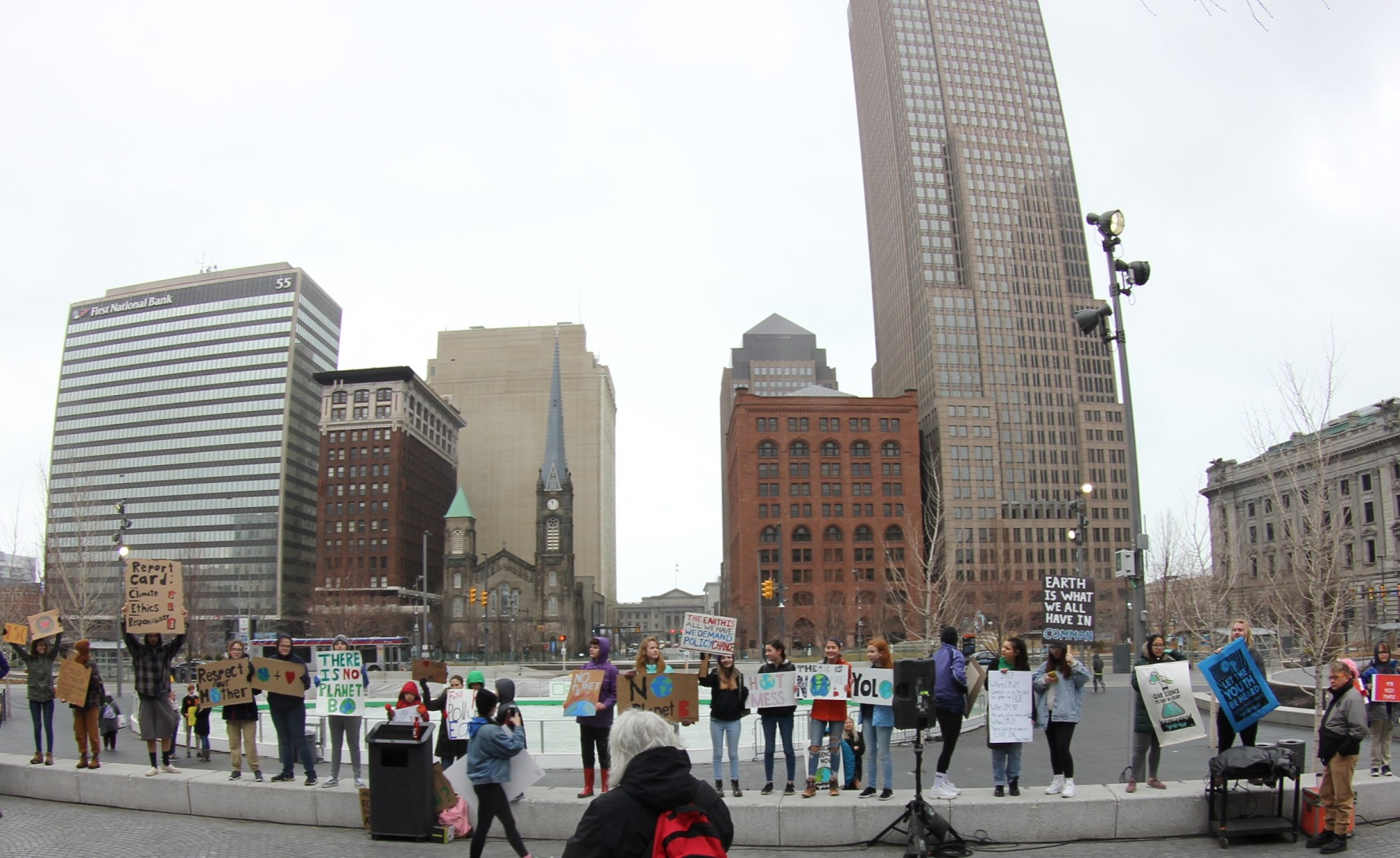
School strike in Cleveland on 15 March 2019

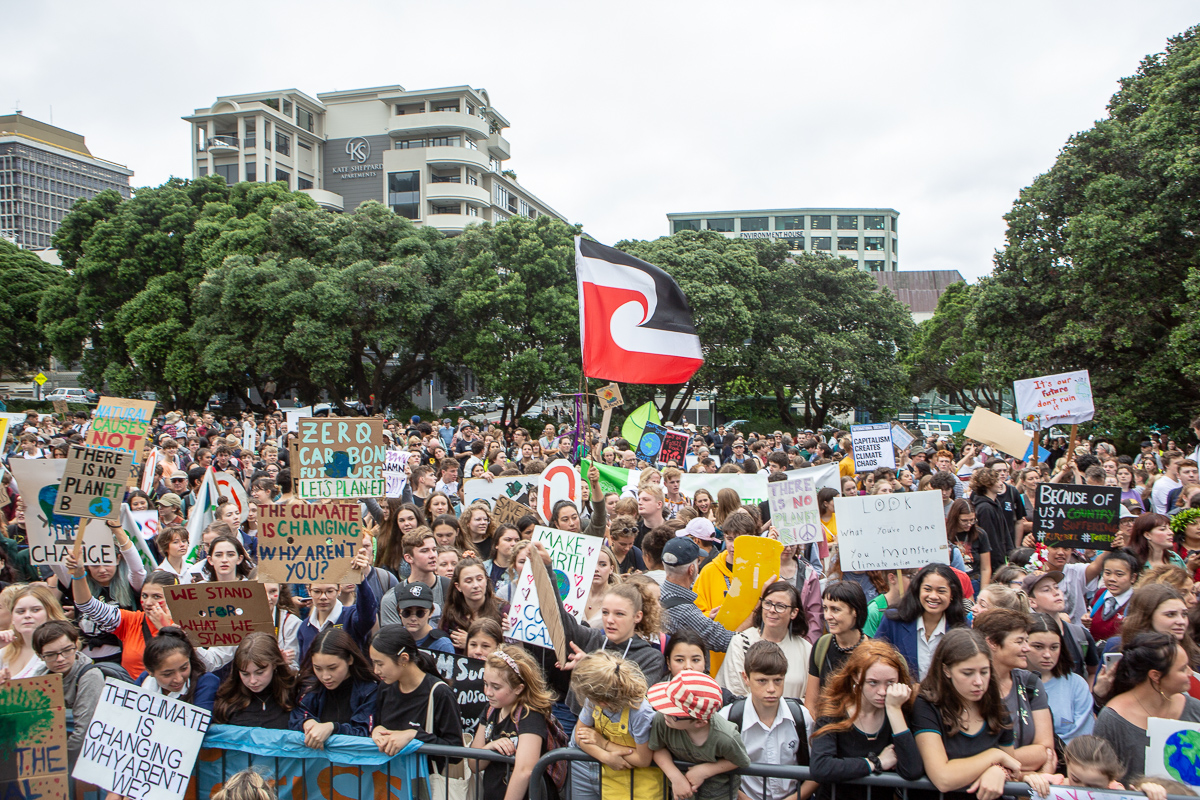
School strike for climate in Wellington on 15 March 2019

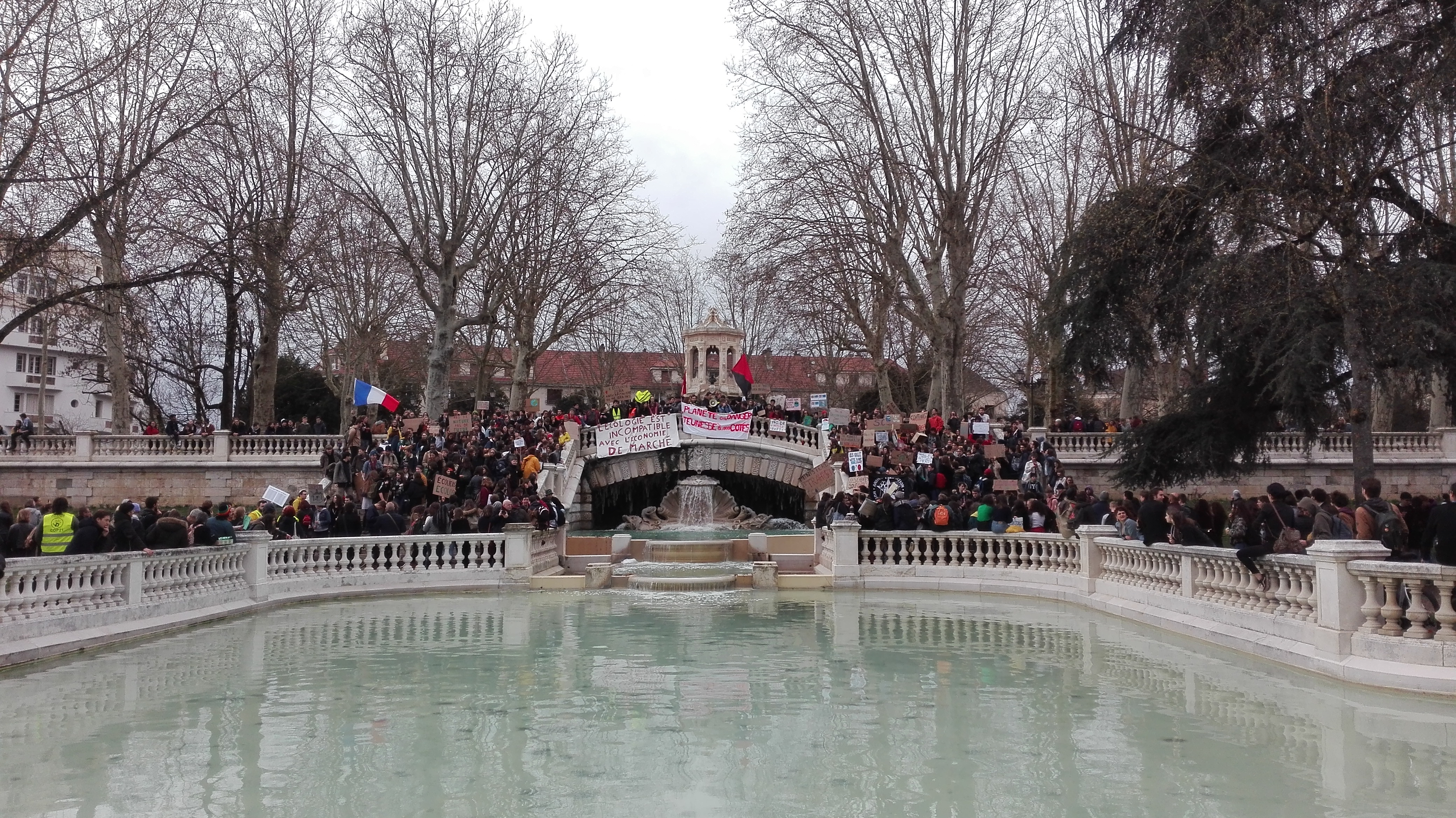
A speech being delivered from the stairs of the Jardin Darcy, in Dijon (Côte-d'Or, Burgundy, France) for the global climate strike on 15 March 2019

=== Second Global Climate Strike on 24 May 2019 ===
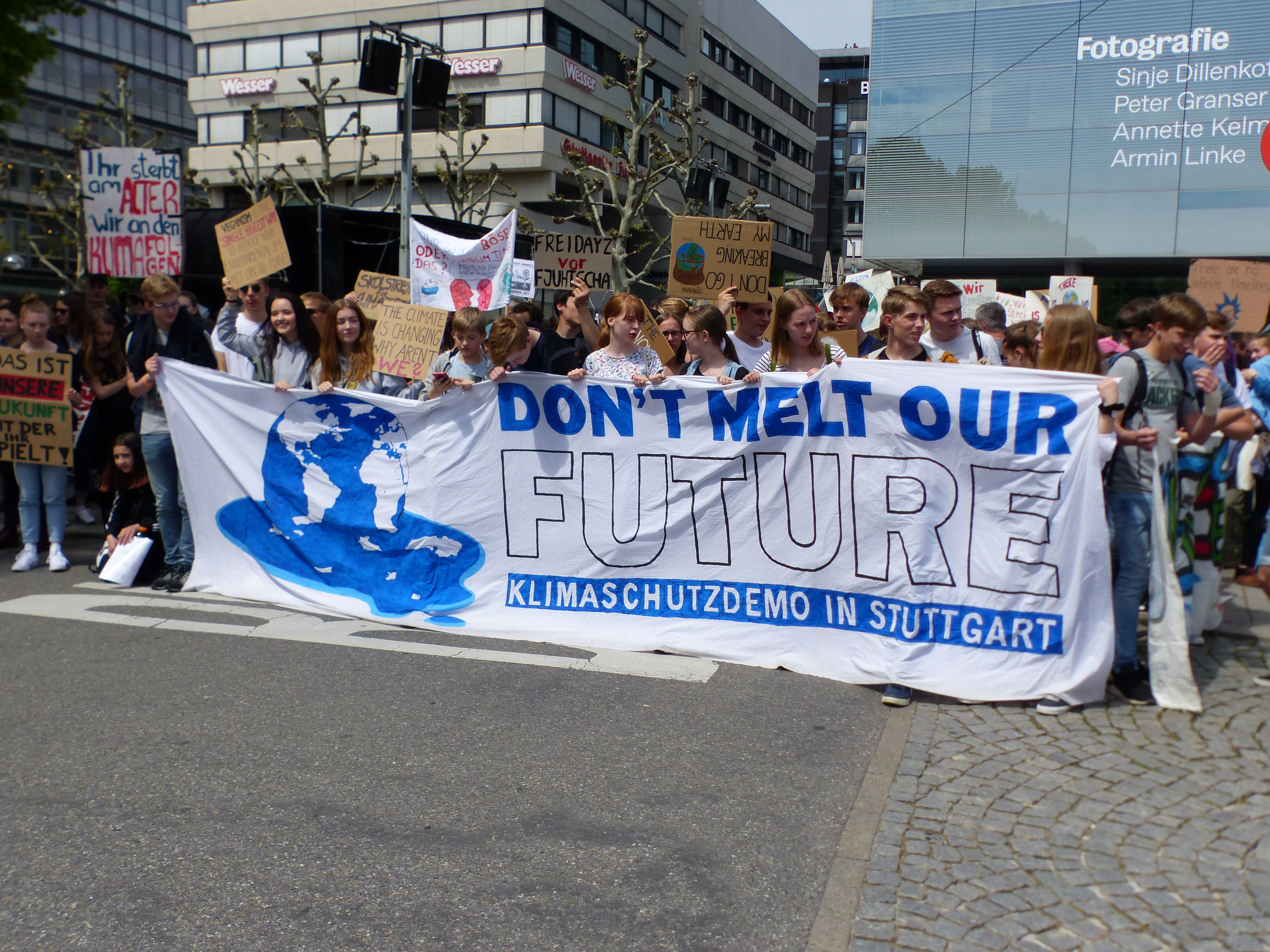
Climate Strike in Stuttgart on 24 May 2019

Climate Strike in Lisbon on 24 May 2019

A second wave of global climate strikes began with actions in New Zealand and Australia on 24 May 2019. Hundreds of thousands of school students around the world struck in more than 1600 towns in at least 125 countries. Thunberg, one of the organizers, said that the strike took place on the second day of the four-day 2019 European Parliament election to affect it. Polls conducted at the time show that climate change was an important issue for voters in the election—the most important issue for German voters.

=== International climate strike in Aachen on 21 June 2019 ===
Fridays for Future Deutschland called for a major climate strike under the motto "Climate justice without borders – United for a future" also inviting people from 17 countries to come to Aachen on 21 June 2019. Protesters gathered at several points all over the city (including at Aachen main station, Westpark, RWTH CARL and Vaals) representing different chapters of the movement. Accompanied by several musical groups, they then walked or drove with bicycles through the streets to the main event at the Tivoli, thereby blocking larger parts of the traffic infrastructure for hours. Some protesters occupied a house, a bridge and several poles to raise large posters. A number of 10,000 to 20,000 people was anticipated. According to the organizers, with eventually 40,000 protesters this peaceful event turned out to be the largest single FFF climate strike in a German city that far. (Note: Except for the "Wald retten – Kohle stoppen!" (English: "Save the forest – Stop coal!") demonstration on 6 October 2018 at the Hambach Forest, which drew some 50,000 people, but was more focused on stopping lignite mining and saving the forest rather than preventing climate change in general.) The police acknowledged the originally anticipated numbers. Among the many speakers were Cyril Dion (France), Karen Raymond (India), Tetet Nera-Lauron (Philippines) and Jesse (Netherlands), Milan Schwarze and Sina Chom (Ende Gelände), as well as activists from the Hambach Forest, Pacific Climate Warriors, Alle Dörfer bleiben! (English: All villages stay!) and All in for Climate Action. Artists participating in the event included Brass Riot, Culcha Candela, Bodo Wartke, Moop Mama, Ruslana Lyzhychko, KingzCorner, Leo Holldack and Davide Martello. Among the protesters were Rezo and Anton Hofreiter.

In parallel to this event, a group of Ende Gelände 2019 activists started protests at the nearby Garzweiler II open-pit lignite mine, blocking various mining infrastructure over the weekend. FFFD had recently declared its solidarity with this movement, stating that under the circumstances civil disobedience would be a legitimate form of protest to save the future, but, organising another demonstration on 22 June 2019 in Hochneukirch/Jüchen in the direct neighbourhood of the open-pit mine, that Fridays for Future would remain on the legal side.

On 19 June 2019, shortly before the events, the city of Aachen had followed several other German cities and declared a "climate emergency" state.

=== International conference in Lausanne on 5–9 August 2019 ===
From 5 to 9 August 2019, the University of Lausanne hosted 450 young Europeans from the climate strike movement for the "SMILE for Future" conference ("Summer Meeting in Lausanne Europe"). On 9 August 2019, the conference ended with a demonstration and the publication of the Lausanne Climate Declaration stating the values, objectives and measures proposed by the movements' participants in Lausanne.

=== Global Week of Climate Action on 20–27 September 2019 ===
Protest attendee numbers from 20 to 27 September 2019, by country: 1,000,000+ 100,000+ 10,000+ 1,000+ 100+ Small protests, unclear numbers

The September Global Week for Climate Action was a series of strikes and events from 20 to 27 September 2019, primarily focused on the two Fridays 20 and 27 September. Timed to occur around the UN Climate Action Summit on 23 September, the protests were planned in 4500 locations across 150 countries.

Organizers of 20 September protests reported that over 4 million people participated in strikes worldwide, including 1.4 million participants in Germany and 300,000 protesters in Australia. On 27 September, an estimated two million people participated in demonstrations worldwide, including over one million protesters in Italy and several hundred thousand protesters in Canada.

=== Fourth Global Climate Strike on 29 November 2019 ===
On 29 November 2019, three days before the start of the United Nations Climate Change Conference (COP25) in Madrid, demonstrations took place in 2,400 cities across 157 countries to protest government inaction on the climate crisis. The organizers estimated the number of participants at 2 million, including about 630,000 people in Germany.

A week later, the central COP25 protest took place in Madrid, with an estimated turnout of half a million, in which FFF activists from all over the world participated.

== Later events, 2020s ==
=== Global Climate Strike on 25 September 2020 ===
On 25 September 2020, a global climate strike took place. Strikes were scheduled in thousands of locations around the globe.

=== Global Climate Strike on 19 March 2021 ===
On Friday 19 March 2021, another global climate strike saw protests in hundreds of places around the planet; due to the ongoing COVID-19 pandemic, the scale of in-person gatherings was much reduced compared to previous years.

=== Dissolution of Auckland chapter in June 2021 ===
On 15 June 2021, the Auckland chapter of New Zealand's School Strike 4 Climate movement formally disbanded on the grounds that it had been racist towards BIPOC (Black, Indigenous and people of colour). The group said that it would no longer organise strikes and instead pledged to "uplift BIPOC-led climate justice spaces." The dissolution of the Auckland chapter of the NZ School Strike movement drew mixed responses. Mary Moeono-Kolio, the Wellington coordinator of 350 Pacific Climate Warriors, and School Strike founder and national coordinator Sophie Hanford stated there was no room for racists in the climate movement and called for indigenous leadership on climate justice. Indigenous youth climate advocacy group Te Ara Whatu spokesperson Anevili welcomed the decision as a means of tackling racism but expressed concerned that activists of colour could be blamed for the Auckland chapter's dissolution.

=== Global Climate Strike on 24 September 2021 ===
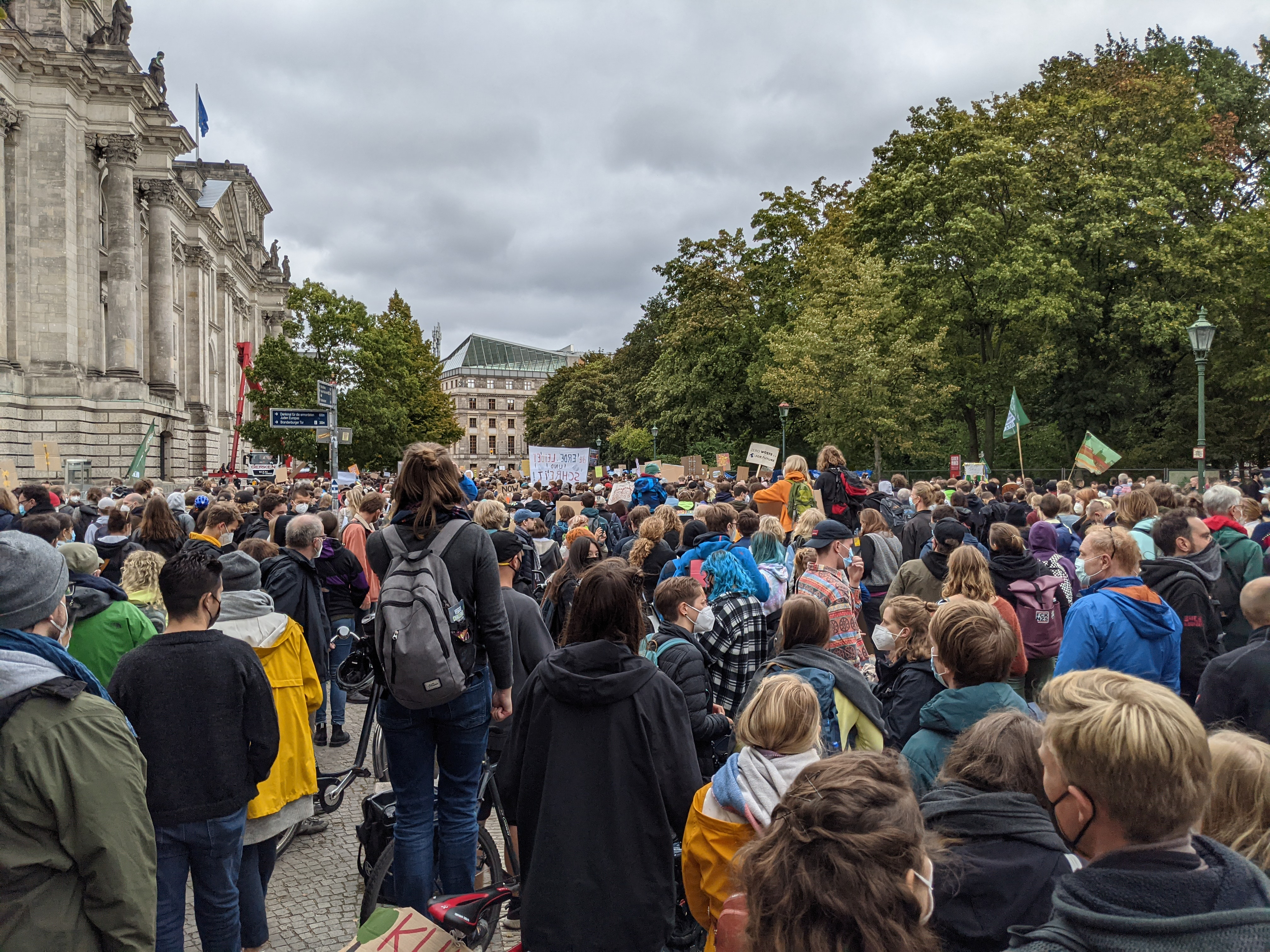
Global Climate Strike in Berlin on 24 September 2021

On 24 September 2021 strikes were scheduled in more than 1400 locations around the globe. Strikes were held in more than 90 countries with big events in Europe, America and Africa. Some of the largest demonstrations were held in Germany. Greta Thunberg addressed more than 100,000 people in Berlin and declared that "No political party is doing enough".

=== Global Climate Strike on 25 March 2022 ===
On 25 March 2022, a global climate strike took place.

=== Global Climate Strike on 23 September 2022 ===
On 23 September 2022, a global climate strike took place. More than 30,000 people took part in Berlin.

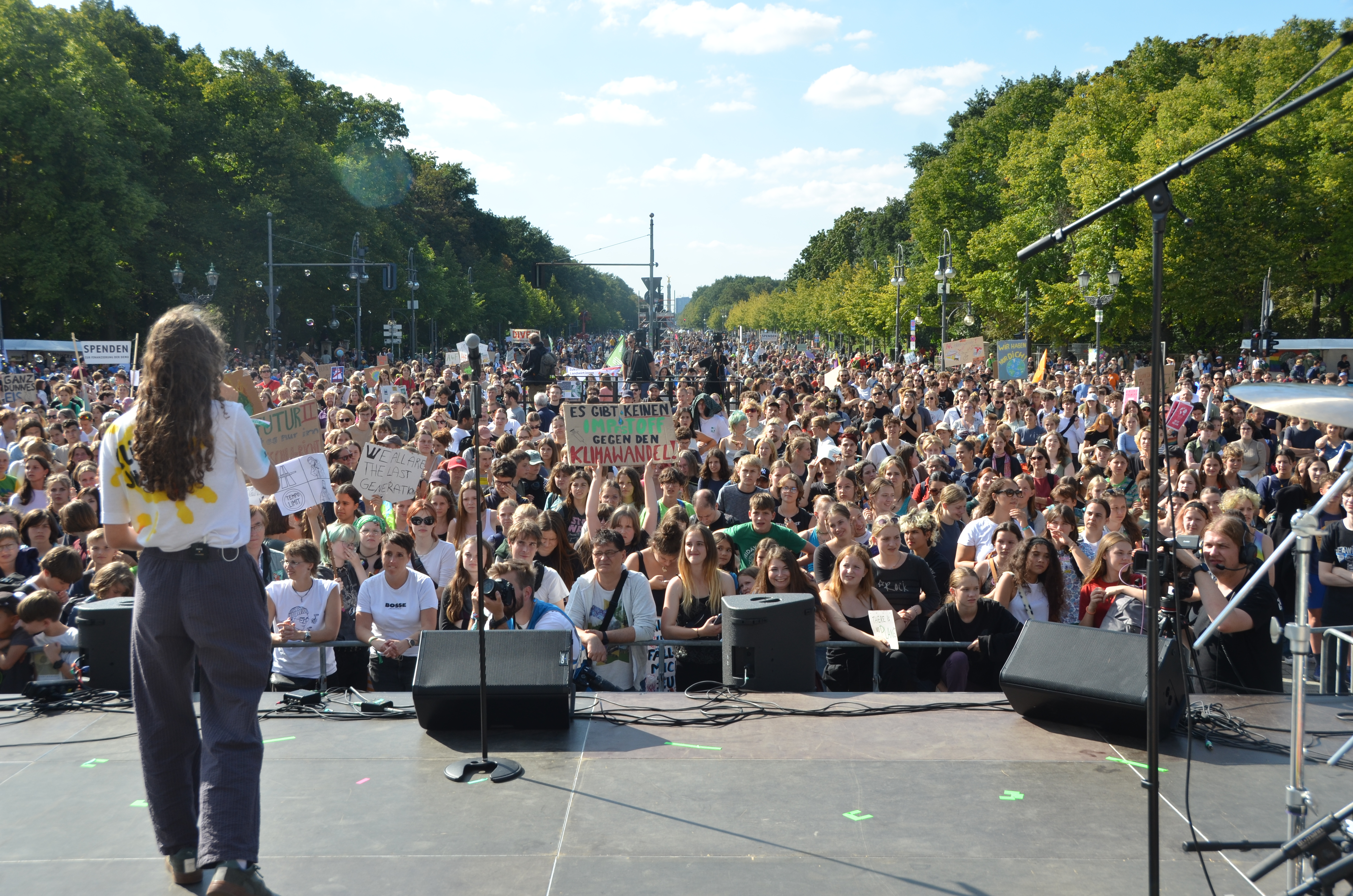
Fridays for Future Climate Strike in Berlin, 2023

=== Global Climate Strike on 3 March 2023 ===
On 3 March 2023, a global climate strike took place. In Germany strikes were scheduled in more than 240 locations, including in Berlin where more than 18,000 people took part. According to FFF Germany more than 220,000 people protested against German climate policies, especially in the transport sector.

In New Zealand, climate strikes were held in several cities and towns including Auckland, Wellington, Christchurch, Dunedin, Nelson, Napier, New Plymouth and Palmerston North.

=== Split of German chapter ===
In November 2023, Fridays for Future Germany, the largest chapter of the international Fridays for Future movement, split away from the international movement and founder Greta Thunberg after Thunberg brought a Palestinian person on stage with her during an Amsterdam protest. Volker Becker, president of the German–Israeli Society, said that Thunberg's support for Palestine signaled "the end of Greta Thunberg as a climate activist." Fridays for Future Sweden co-authored an article in The Guardian with Thunberg, emphasizing the unity of the climate crisis with protests against the Gaza genocide.

== Digital climate strike ==
The climate strike online movement, sometimes referred to as "digital strike", was started by two Asian-American climate activists, Iris Zhan, from Howard County, Maryland, United States; and George Zhang, from Los Angeles, California; in April 2019. This branch of climate striking was created to make climate activism accessible to those unable to strike physically. In March 2020, following the outbreak of the COVID-19 pandemic, Greta Thunberg encouraged the movement to not gather in the streets or town squares, but to instead sit at home with a sign and post the image on the Internet. The movement has since amassed notable popularity due to restrictions passed regarding large gatherings during the COVID-19 pandemic lockdowns, receiving attention from organisations such as Greenpeace and Amnesty International.

Since its formation, the Fridays for Future Digital movement has engaged in a series of campaigns aimed at raising awareness of various climate justice issues. These include efforts to teach climate change education in schools and protect indigenous climate activists from harmful government policies.

== Scientific background ==
Global warming—the progression from cooler historical temperatures (blue) to recent warmer temperatures (red)—is being experienced disproportionately by younger generations. With continued fossil fuel emissions, that trend will continue.

The emission of vast amounts of carbon dioxide and other greenhouse gases by human activities is warming the climate, through the greenhouse effect. In the historical past the greenhouse effect, driven by volcanic and microbial carbon dioxide emission, prevented the earth from being permanently encased in ice, but since humanity industrialised, atmospheric carbon dioxide has increased and is causing ever more harmful global warming and climate change. The only processes that take carbon dioxide out of the atmosphere (once takeup by acidifying the oceans is saturated) are geological—locking up of carbon by weathering and formation of rocks as carbonates and other compounds, on a timescale of hundreds of thousands of years—and botanical, uptake of carbon by vegetation, locking it up unless the vegetation burns or rots without being replaced, on a timescale of, at best, centuries.

Adults in positions of authority, in the form of fossil fuel corporations and global governments, are seen as being responsible for large carbon dioxide emissions, and doing far too little to reduce them. A 2019 statement by over 12,000 scientists says that "Young people's concerns are justified and supported by the best available science".

=== Support from scientists ===
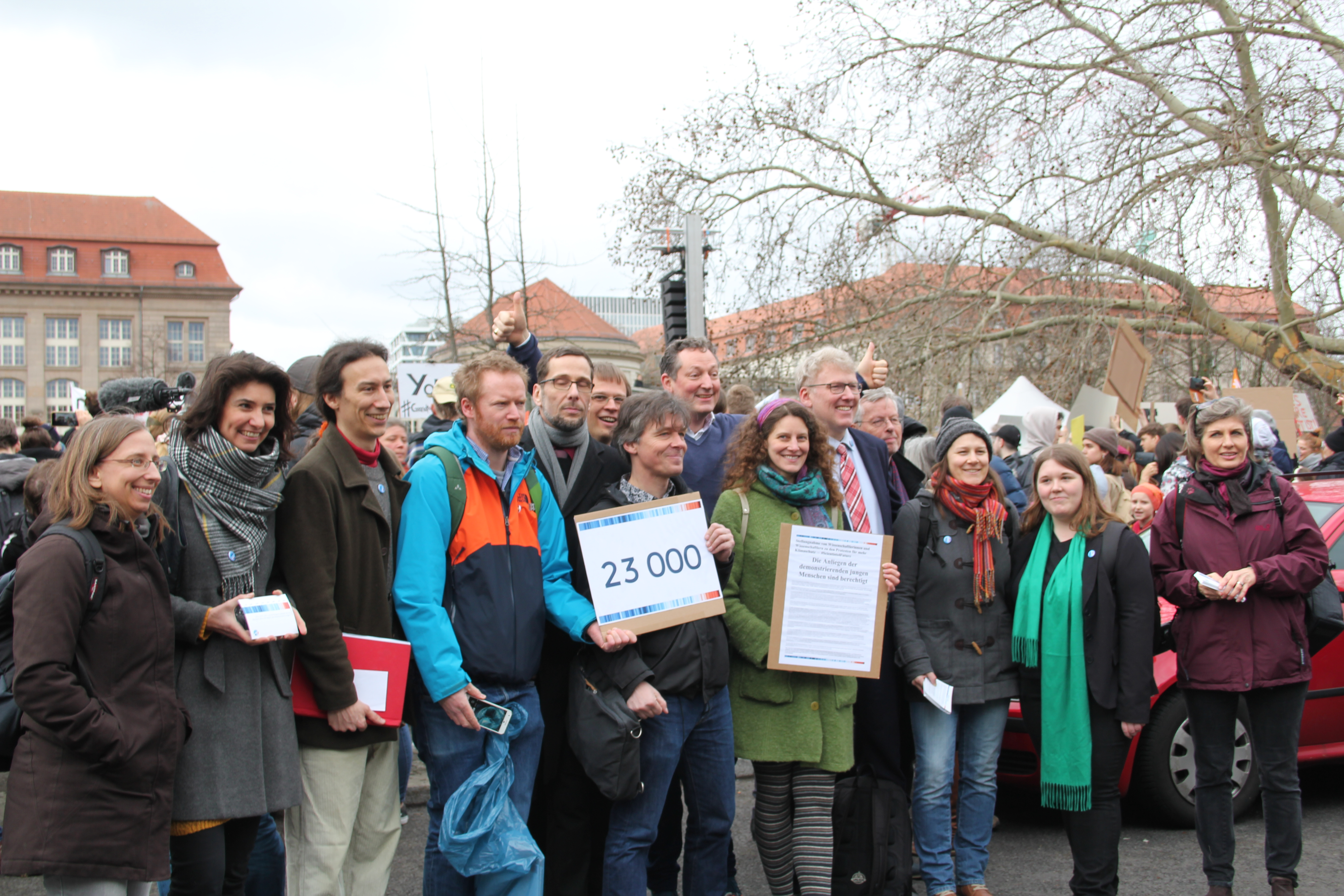
German scientists Volker Quaschning, Eckart von Hirschhausen, Henning Krause, Martin Visbeck and Gregor Hagedorn, at 15 March 2019 climate march at Invalidenpark, Berlin-Mitte, in front of the Federal Ministry for Economic Affairs and Energy

On 31 January 2019, more than 3,400 Belgian scientists and academics signed an open letter in support of the school strikes. The letter reads "On the basis of the facts supplied by climate science, the campaigners are right. That is why we, as scientists, support them." This was followed by an open letter in support of the school strikes in the Netherlands, signed by 340 scientists, and by 1,200 researchers in Finland signing a letter, on 11 March 2019, supporting the strikes. An article published in Nature in March 2019 listed many other expressions of support, and no criticisms, from scientists, with comments such as "The idea of a climate strike is innovative. It's provocative, and I think it's the right form of non-violent civil disobedience".

In Germany, Austria, and Switzerland a group of scientists founded Scientists for Future (S4F) in support of the factual correctness of the claims formulated by the movement. The statement was signed by over 26,000 German-language scientists and scholars.

On 14 March 2019, the Club of Rome issued an official statement in support of Thunberg and the strikes, urging governments across the world to respond to this call for action and cut global carbon emissions.

In early April 2019, a letter titled "Concerns of young protesters are justified" was published in Science. The letter declared that the climate strikers' concerns are "justified and supported by the best available science" and was signed by over 3,000 scientists worldwide.

In June 2019, 1,000 healthcare professionals in the UK and elsewhere, including professors, eminent public health figures, and former presidents of royal colleges, called for widespread non-violent civil disobedience in response to "woefully inadequate" government policies on the unfolding ecological emergency. They called on politicians and the news media to face the facts of the unfolding ecological emergency and take action. They supported the school strike movement and Extinction Rebellion.

On 14 October 2020, FFF Germany released a report from the Wuppertal Institute it had earlier commissioned. The underlying numerical study used scenario analysis to articulate a credible pathway for Germany to be carbon neutral by 2035.

Fridays For Future International created an appeal endorsed by Scientist Rebellion and 61 scientists, including Michael Meeropol, Don Trent Jacobs Allan J. Singer, Stefan Sommer. The appeal is linking peace, justice and climate. The central argument of the appeal is that addressing the ecological crisis requires ending overconsumption, which cannot be achieved while wars continue, as economic growth (GDP) directly fuels military capacity. Since climate change poses a threat to all, including the wealthy, the appeal advocates for the establishment of peace and justice as a shared interest for all parties. 24 organisations endorsed the appeal as well as some prominent activists like Tori Tsui, Betsy Rosenberg.

== Reactions by schools, politicians, and parents ==
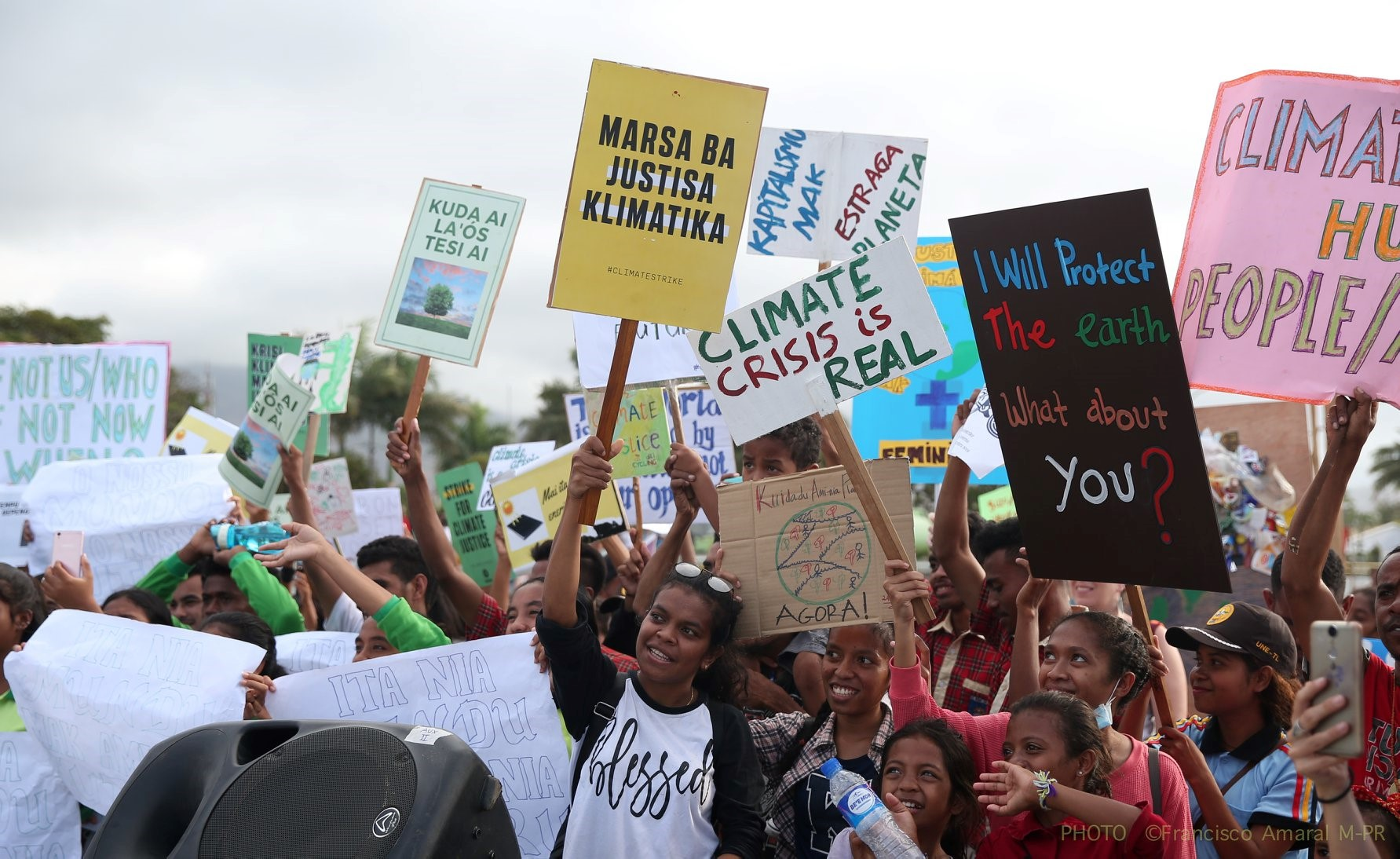
September 2019 climate strike in Dili, East Timor

The strikes have been both praised and criticised by adults in positions of authority. In the European Union, the movement enjoyed significant support by Volt Europa, a progressive and federalist European political alliance, which, according to a report by Parents for Future before the European Elections 2019, shared all demands published by Fridays for Future in April 2019.

Conservative politicians in the United Kingdom and Australia have described the strikes as truancy; some children have been punished or arrested for striking or demonstrating. Then UK Prime Minister Theresa May criticised the strikes as wasting lesson and teaching time. Jeremy Corbyn, former leader of the Labour Party and Leader of the Opposition, and Sir Vincent Cable, Leader of the Liberal Democrats, both voiced their support for the strikes, as did leaders of other UK parties. UK energy minister Claire Perry said that she would have joined the strikes in her younger days. David Reed, director of charity Generation Change, pointed out that "the school leaders seem to have missed the point of efforts over the past decade to raise education standards. For what does excellence in education look like if it's not pupils being engaged enough on issues such as climate change to do something about them?"

Prime Minister of Australia Scott Morrison called for "more learning and less activism" following the strikes. Australia's Education Minister Dan Tehan said that if school students think that issues are important, they should take action after school or on weekends.

In New Zealand, there was mixed response from politicians, community leaders, and schools. Students were threatened to be marked as truant by some principals for attending the strike without their parents' or school's permission. Judith Collins, and several other members of parliament were dismissive of the impact of the strike, while Climate Change Minister James Shaw expressed support noting that little attention would be paid to marchers protesting on the weekend.

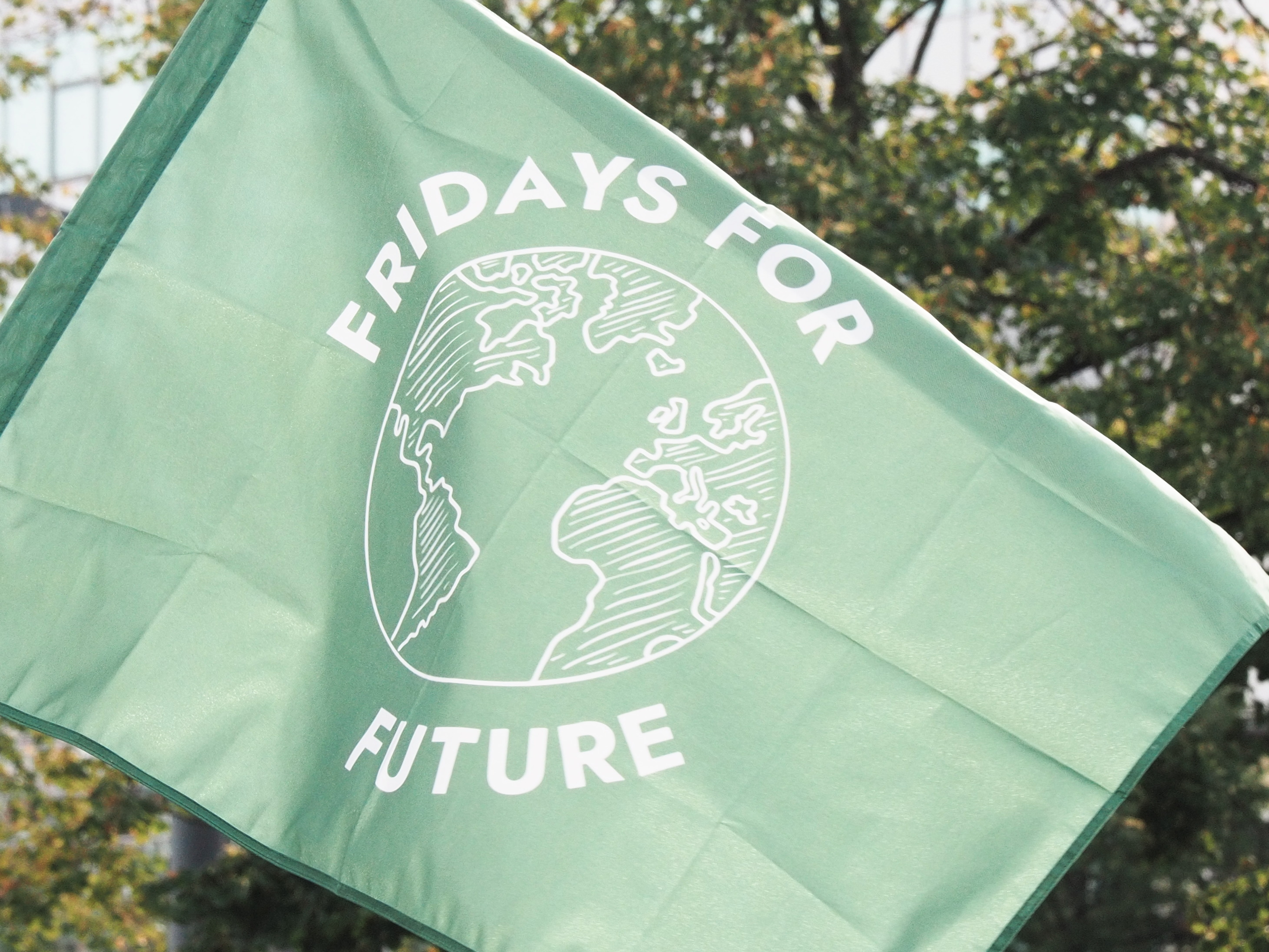
A Fridays for Future flag during a demonstration on 23 September 2022 in Germany

On 15 March 2019 the UN Secretary-General António Guterres embraced the strikers, admitting that "My generation has failed to respond properly to the dramatic challenge of climate change. This is deeply felt by young people. No wonder they are angry." Guterres invited world leaders to a UN summit in September 2019 with "concrete realistic plans to enhance their nationally determined contributions by 2020".

Many parents, including public figures, have supported the children's climate strikes. A spokesperson for the "Our Kids' Climate" organisation says that "an adult's presence can help keep strikers safe," and "suggests bringing a sign that will resonate with other parents, for example a sign that says "I'm a concerned mom." Moms Clean Air Force recommends contacting school officials, providing snacks for the children, and standing with signs in solidarity.

The Elders Climate Action organisation has created T-shirts which feature a grandparent hand in hand with a child, and seeks to mobilise "grandparents, great aunts and great uncles ... while there is still time to protect the well-being of our grandchildren."

Showing a trend of new environment-related dictionary terms, "climate strike" was named Collins Dictionary's 2019 word of the year. Collins lexicographers had noticed a hundredfold increase in the use of the term in 2019, the largest of any word on their list.

== Censorship ==
=== India ===
In July 2020, the website of the Indian collective of Fridays for Future groups was blocked by the Government of India. The groups were leading a campaign against a controversial new EIA Draft proposed by the government.

== Awards ==
On 7 June 2019, Fridays for Future and Greta Thunberg were honoured with Amnesty International's Ambassador of Conscience Award. Secretary General Kumi Naidoo said:

We are humbled and inspired by the determination with which youth activists across the world are challenging us all to confront the realities of the climate crisis. Every young person taking part in Fridays for Future embodies what it means to act on your conscience. They remind us that we are more powerful than we know and that we all have a role to play in protecting human rights against climate catastrophe.

== See also ==
- Climate justice
- Earth Strike
- Individual action on climate change
- List of school climate strikes
- Youth activism
