= Hilda Morales Trujillo =

Lawyer and Women's rights activist

Hilda Morales Trujillo is a lawyer in Guatemala who has become internationally known for her work in defending women's rights and as a campaigner for Guatemala's Network for Non-Violence Against Women. In 2004 she shared the Amnesty International Ambassador of Conscience Award with Mary Robinson.

== Background ==
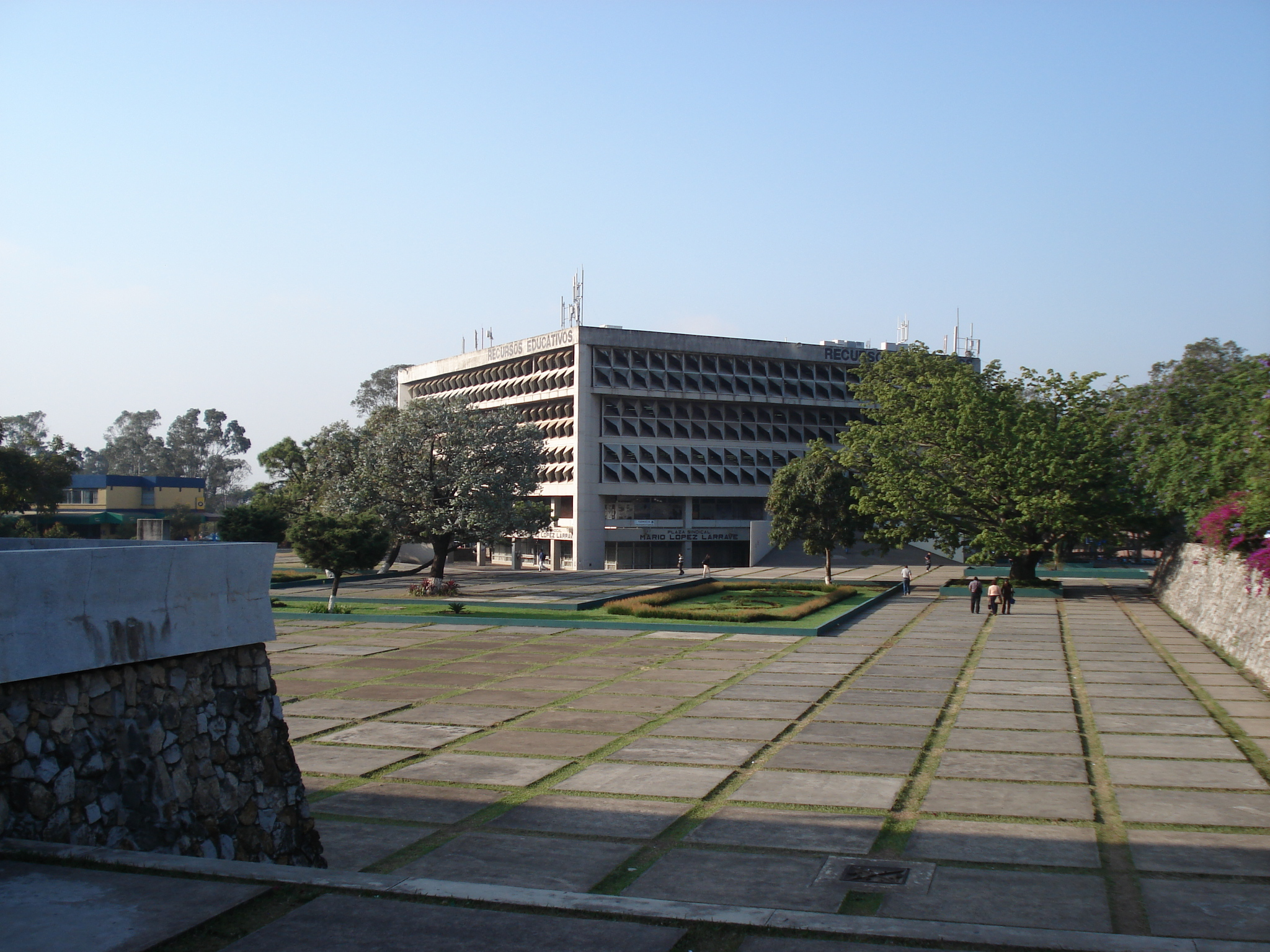
Brenda graduated in law from University of San Carlos in Guatemala City.

Trujillo was born in Ciudad Flores, Petén, Guatemala in 1943. She graduated in law from University of San Carlos of Guatemala in 1970. Many of her early cases involved domestic violence. After being appointed Professor of Family Law at the University of San Carlos she lectured for eight years in family law and on the need for law to provide legal protection for women and their children.

In 1991 she was appointed a delegate to the National Women’s Office (ONAM). In 1993 after the coup d’etat, she was appointed Vice Minister for Work and Social Security, helping to establish the Unit for the Promotion of Women Workers.

In 1994 Trujillo was involved in petitioning the Guatemalan state to ratify the Inter-American Convention for the Prevention, Punishment and Eradication of Violence Against Women. In 1996 she helped pass a law for the Prevention, Punishment and Eradication of Domestic Violence. In 1997 as part of the Network against Violence against Women (Red de la No Violencia contra Mujeres) Tujillo authored a report on the family courts refusal to apply the Law for the Prevention, Punishment and Eradication of Domestic Violence. Her findings and recommendations were approved in 2000, establishing the National Commission for the Prevention of Domestic Violence (CONAPREVI).

== Campaign against rape and murder of women and children ==
Trujillo's primary concern is preventing more examples of the thousands of women who have been raped and then murdered, often in an horrific manner, over the last decade. In 2009, the Amnesty International report on human rights violations in Guatemala included this section on violence against women and children (the core area of Trujillo's work):
"The police reported that 687 women were the victims of homicide in 2008; their bodies frequently showed signs of rape and other torture. The Office of the UN High Commissioner for Human Rights reported in January that discriminatory practices by the authorities persisted, resulting in a failure to investigate killings of women and a tendency to blame the victim. In April, Congress passed a new Law Against Femicide. The law received a mixed response from civil society organizations." This social violence has been referred to by Trujillo as "femicidio".

== Amnesty International Ambassador of Conscience Award ==
In 2004, Trujillo shared the Amnesty International Ambassador of Conscience Award with Mary Robinson former President of Ireland and United Nations High Commissioner for Human Rights.
