= Collège Saint-Paul (Godinne) =

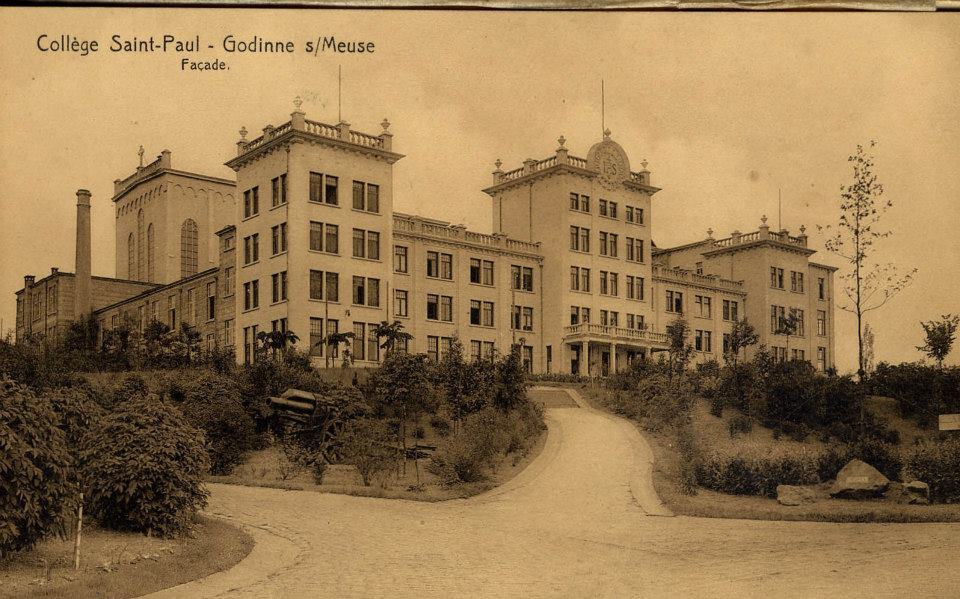
The front of the school in 1933

The Collège Saint-Paul is an educational institution located in Godinne, a village near Namur (Belgium) that merged with a neighboring school, the Collège de Burnot. Together they now form the Collège de Godinne-Burnot.

== History ==
The Collège Saint-Paul de Godinne is an elementary and secondary Jesuit school with a boarding school. The boarding school was only for boys until it became mixed in 2018. It was originally built to house the students of the Collège Notre-Dame de la Paix in Namur, whose premises became too small. The first pupils arrived in 1927.

=== The western part ===
To the west, the ground floor was initially occupied by parlors. In 1971, these parlors were turned into administrative offices and, later, into primary classes in addition to the offices. In 2016, the offices were moved to the first floor to make the opening of new primary classes possible. In that way the premises on the ground floor were free and ready to accommodate new pupils. Until the early 2000s the upper floors were occupied by the community of the Jesuit Fathers (bedrooms, refectory, chapel).

=== The southern part ===
Since its construction, the southern part of the school has been used for educational purposes. Study and recreation rooms are located on the ground floor, while the various classrooms and the library (established shortly after 1985) are located on the first floor. The last two floors are occupied by the boarding school's dormitories that were built over two floors with a passageway, serving the rooms on the upper floor and leaving the central space clear.

== Notable former students ==
- Stromae
- Benoît Poelvoorde

== See also ==
- List of Jesuit sites in Belgium
- Diocese of Namur
