= Holly Gillibrand =

Scottish environmental activist

Holly Gillibrand (born 2005) is a Scottish environmental activist.

== Overview ==
Gillibrand is an organizer for Fridays for Future Scotland. She serves as a youth advisor for the charity Heal Rewilding, which aims to return more land to nature, as well as being a young ambassador for Scotland: The Big Picture and a campaigner for animal welfare charity OneKind. She has written for the Lochaber Times.

Gillibrand was named the 2019 Glasgow Times Young Scotswoman of the Year. She was also named by BBC Radio 4 as one of 30 inspiring women on its Woman's Hour Power List 2020, and was interviewed on the show.

== History ==
Gillibrand was born in 2005 in Fort William, Scotland in the UK.

In 2018, at the age of 13, Gillibrand became aware of the global environmental crisis. She started skipping school to take part in the school strike for climate change campaign and was featured in the media. A year later, she was listed by the BBC as a young global climate activist.

In August 2020, Gillibrand supported Chris Packham in a national campaign to stop wildlife crime. In November of that year, she and other youth activists had a Question and Answer session with Alok Sharma.

Along with other Scottish environmental activists, Gillibrand starred in the BBC Scotland film The Oil Machine (2022), which details the reliance of the United Kingdom on North Sea oil.
