= Collège Notre-Dame de la Paix =

Our Lady of Peace College
- Collège Notre-Dame de la Paix
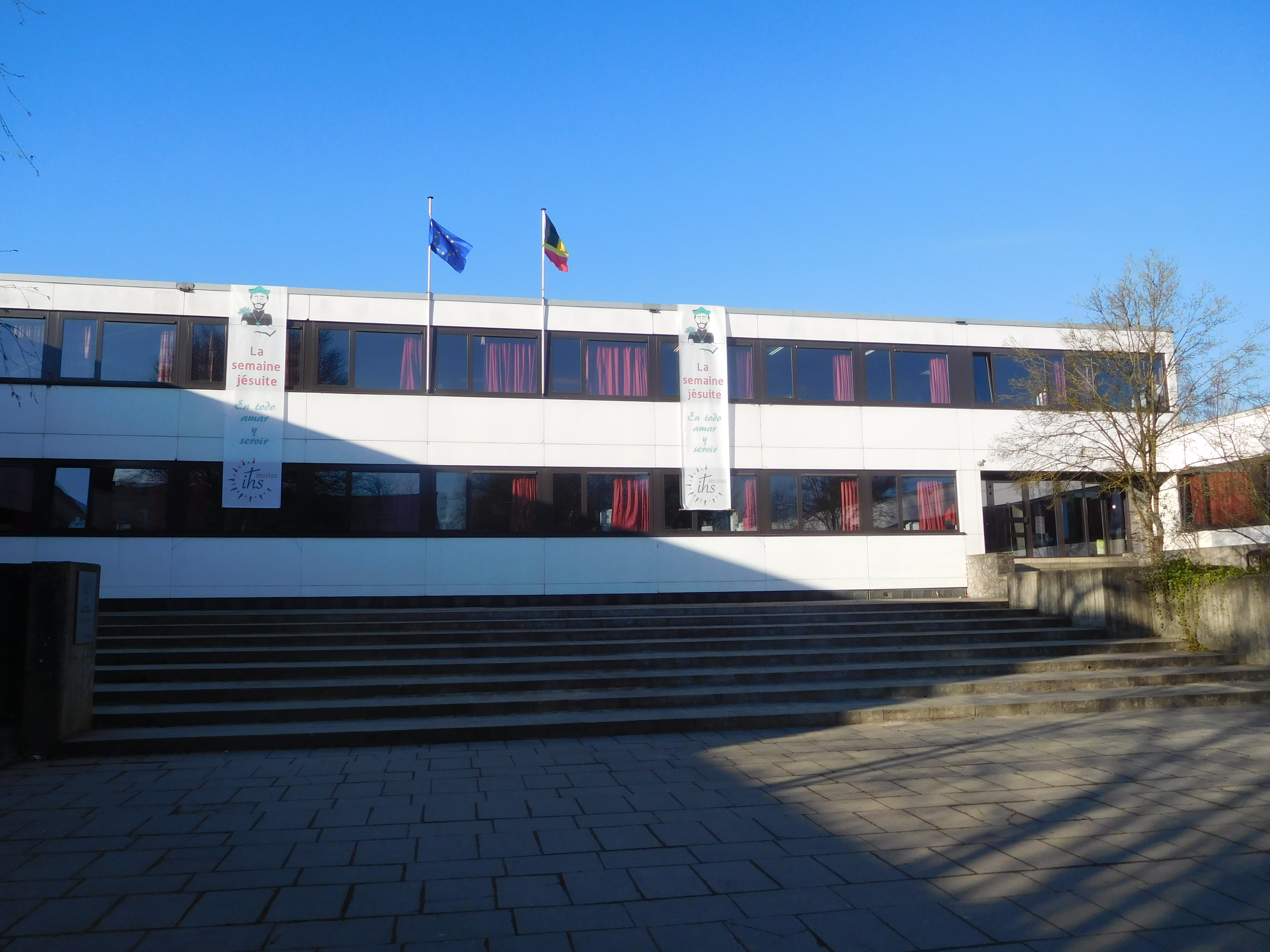

Location
- Erpent, Namur; Belgium
- 50.43987°N 4.89667°E

Information
- Type: Primary and Secondary
- Religious affiliation: Catholic
- Established: 1831
- Director: Anne Coulonval
- Affiliation: Jesuits
- Website: cndp-erpent.be

Collège Notre-Dame de la Paix is a mixed Catholic primary and secondary school in Erpent, Namur, Belgium. Its origins go back to 1610 and the creation of the College of Namur by the Jesuits in the centre of Namur. After the suppression of the Jesuits in 1773 and Belgian independence, the college was opened in 1831 on the rue be Bruxelles in the centre of Namur and in 1971 the entire school was transferred to Erpent, Namur.

== History ==
In 1610, the Jesuits built the College of Namur in the centre of the city. It was built on the street that become the rue du Collège. The college complex included the Church of Saint-Ignace. In 1645, the church was consecrated, later it became the Church of Saint-Loup. In 1773, there was the suppression of the Society of Jesus and the college became the Royal College.

In 1814, the Society of Jesus was restored. In 1831, after Belgian independence, the Jesuits returned to Namur and opened a new college in the buildings of the former Benedictine Abbey of Peace-Notre-Dame. The site was restored and enlarged by Fr Herman Meganck. Faculties of the University of Namur still occupy the site. Originally, there were twelve students and during the first seven years all the students were boarders. In 1838, the doors of the college were opened to external students, after a request from the Bishop of Namur, Nicolas-Joseph Dehesselle. Originally, the college and the university occupied the same site and were under the jurisdiction on a single rector.

In 1926, part of the college left Namur to create Collège Saint-Paul in the Godinne area of Namur. And at the end of the 1960s, the site was too small to accommodate the university and the college. A new site for the college was built in the Erpent area of Namur. The architect was Georges Housiaux (1933-2013), he also designed the restoration of the Casino de Namur, after it burned down in 1980. The first intake for the college in Erpent was in 1971.

== Status ==
The college is part of the association of 'Jesuit Colleges and Institutes of French-speaking Belgium' as well as the General Secretariat of Catholic Education (French: Secrétariat Général de l’Enseignement Catholique). In 2019, the college was given €1.3million by the Government of Wallonia to build a new sports hall and cafeteria. In addition, at the college, delegates from other schools in Namur agreed on how to support students who engage in climate protests.

== See also ==
- Ratio Studiorum
- List of Jesuit sites in Belgium
- Diocese of Namur
