= Westpark (Aachen) =

Park in the west of Aachen

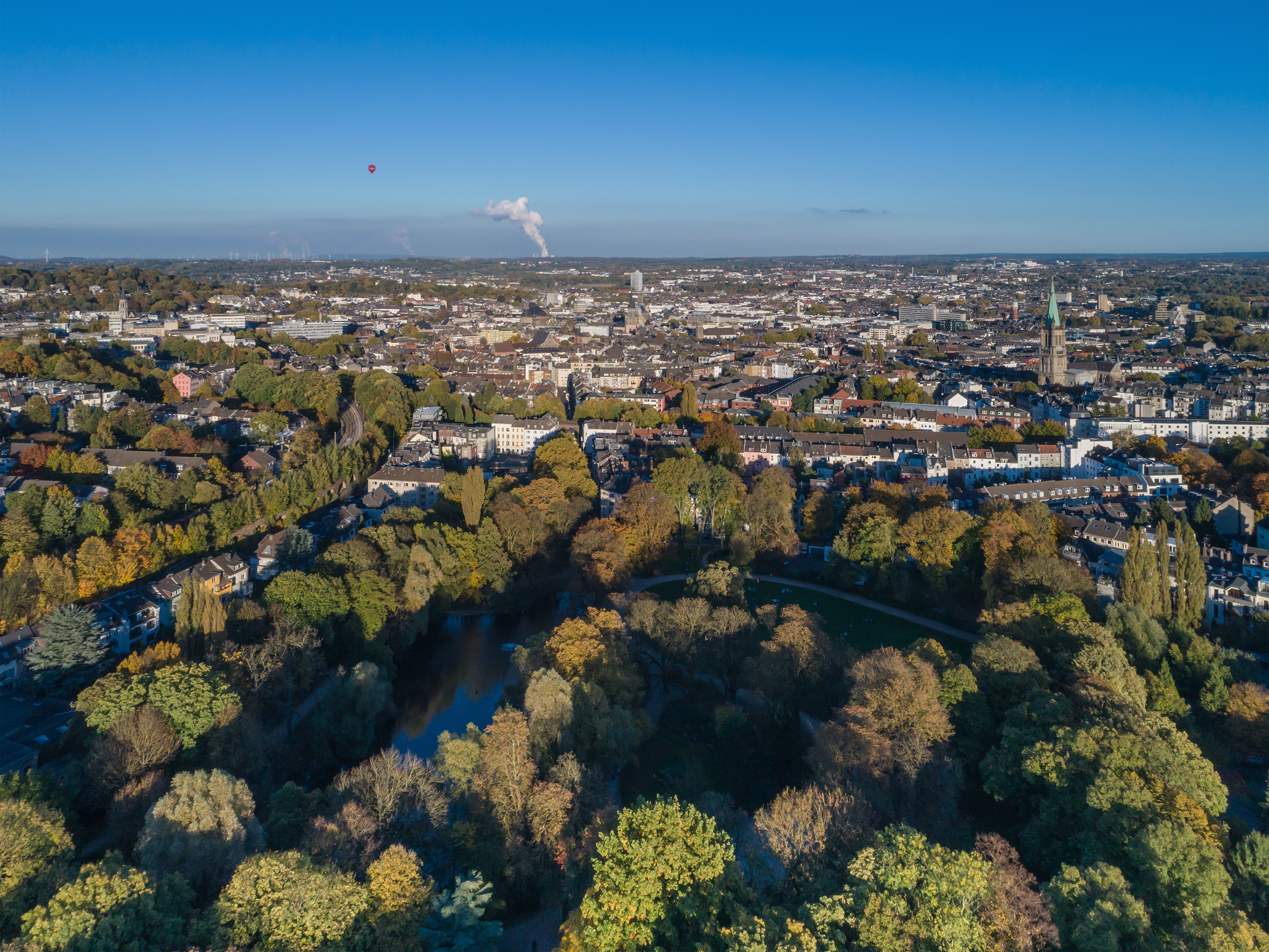
Westpark, aerial view

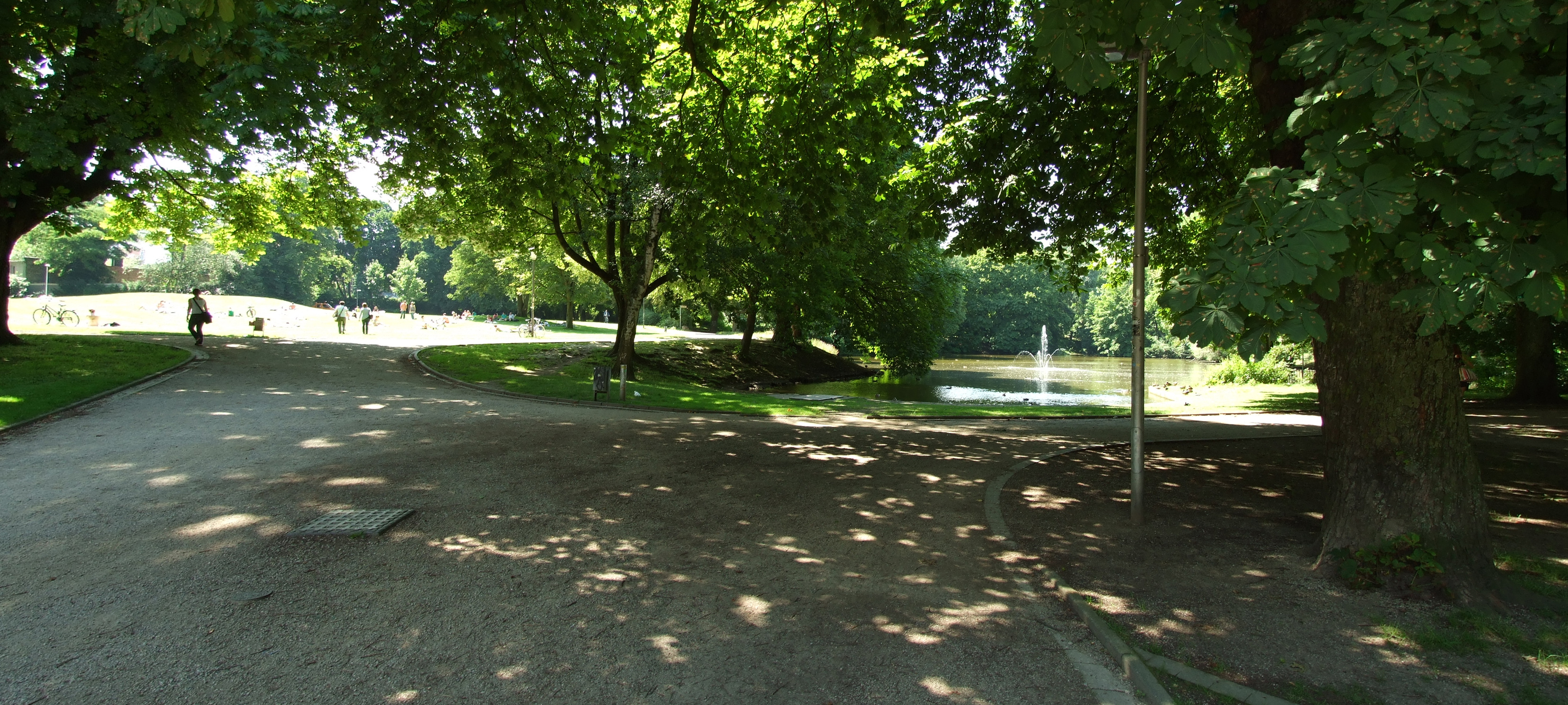
The entrance Lochnerstraße/Gartenstraße from the direction of the Alleenring

The Westpark is a park in the west of Aachen, which is bounded by Gartenstraße, Welkenrather Straße and Vaalser Straße.

== History ==
=== Origins ===
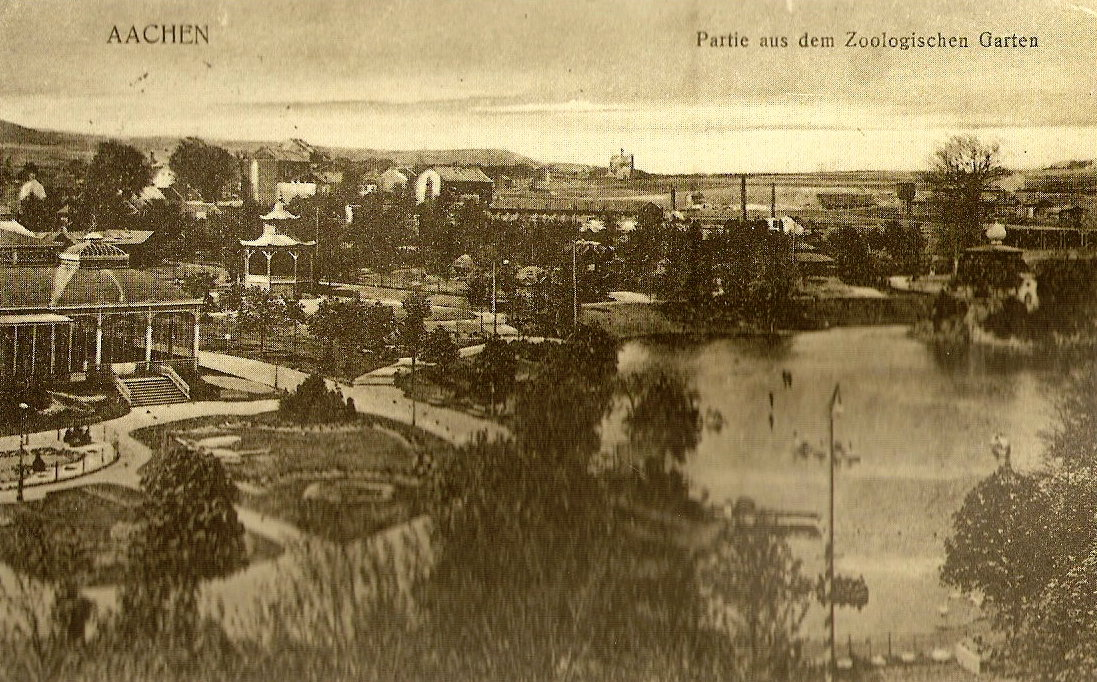
Zoological garden around the turn of the century

A committee led by Emil Lochner, an Aachen textile factory owner, bought the green spaces in front of the Junkerstor in 1882. In the year 1885 the Lochnergarten was formed And formed the substitute for the splendid English garden at the Lochnervilla between Lochnerstrasse and Karlsgraben. In the same year, the zoological garden Aachen was opened under the leadership of the textile manufacturer Lochner, which housed about 50 giant snakes, bears and tigers as well as numerous domestic animal species.

The park was financed partly by shares. In 1882 a glass palace was built next to the park with a large, round hall with many annexed rooms, the walls of which were made of glass. This palace accommodated up to 3,000 visitors.

Around the year 1901 there was a cycle track in the then Lochnerpark, where five students and six school kids from the football club Alemannia (today Alemannia Aachen) held their training with the ball. In the year of the closure of the race track in 1908 the Aachen cycling club Zugvogel 09 also held its first training sessions.

In 1905 the park was temporarily closed because the feed and transport costs for the animals of the Zoological Garden had been underestimated.

In Hugo Junkers's notebooks from 1909, a "permanent circus" in today's Westpark is mentioned.

=== World War I ===
During the First World War, a hospital and a recovery home for soldiers were set up in the glass palace of the park, but it was completely destroyed by a major fire in 1917. The park was revived by the reopening on 23 May 1920. From then on he was named Westpark. Two years later, in 1922, a new but considerably smaller glass palace was opened on the grounds.

=== World War II ===
Already in the year 1935 one could row again go on the pond in the park. In the same year, a zoo was added. In the years before and during the Second World War between 1935 and 1944 it was called "Tier- und Pflanzengarten Aachen" (animal and plant garden Aachen). A large part of the animals died in a bomb attack in 1944. The rest of the animal stock was sold to Ulm.

After the end of the Second World War all existing buildings in the Westpark were demolished. From the time of the zoo, only a pond at the exit to Lochnerstraße has been preserved.

== Present day ==
Today, the Westpark serves the majority of the people from Aachen's west for recreation. For sporting activities, there is a football field, table tennis and a basketball court, as well as numerous playing facilities for children. Some park visitors also practice niche sports such as Slackline, Footbag und Ultimate Frisbee.

In the summer, the park is used by citizens until late in the evening for barbeques. After complaints from local residents grilling in the park is only permitted in the meadow on the Weststraße. This is now also enforced by the Ordnungsamt (office of administration).

At the Westpark are buildings of the Arbeiterwohlfahrt (Workers' Welfare Federal Association) and a depot of the city of Aachen. At the beginning of 2010, on the side of Park, 19 large trees were felled due to fungus attack, as they posed a threat to the AWO building.
