= Ambassador of Conscience Award =

Human rights award

- Awarded for: human rights award
- Date: 2003
- Presented by: Amnesty International
- Website: http://www.amnesty.org/

The Ambassador of Conscience Award is Amnesty International's most prestigious human rights award. It celebrates individuals and groups who have furthered the cause of human rights by showing exceptional courage standing up to injustice and who have used their talents to inspire others. It also aims to generate debate, encourage public action and raise awareness of inspirational stories and human rights issues. The award ceremonies were organised by Art for Amnesty on behalf of Amnesty International up to 2016.

The award was conceived and created in 2003 by Bill Shipsey, the founder of Art for Amnesty. The Award was inspired by a poem written by Seamus Heaney for Amnesty International in 1985. The poem, "From the Republic of Conscience" ends with the lines:"Their embassies he said, were everywhere but operated independently and no ambassador would ever be relieved". Seamus Heaney presented the Award to Václav Havel in the Abbey Theatre in Dublin in November 2003 Nadine Gordimer presented the Award to Nelson Mandela in November 2006 at the Nelson Mandela Foundation in Johannesburg. The Heaney poem was read by Vanessa Redgrave at the inaugural award for Václav Havel in 2003.

== Recipients ==
- 2003 - Václav Havel, former President of the Czech Republic
- 2004 - Mary Robinson, former President of Ireland and UN High Commissioner for Human Rights, and Hilda Morales Trujillo, Guatemalan women's rights activist
- 2005 - Irish rock band U2 and their manager Paul McGuinness
- 2006 - Nelson Mandela, former President of South Africa
- 2008 - Peter Gabriel, musician and humanitarian activist
- 2009 - Aung San Suu Kyi, leader of the Burmese National League for Democracy. The award was subsequently withdrawn on 12 November 2018.
- 2013 - Malala Yousafzai, Pupil, blogger, activist, and Harry Belafonte, American singer, human right and social justice activist
- 2015 - Joan Baez, American folk singer, songwriter and activist and Ai Weiwei, Chinese contemporary artist and activist
- 2016 - Angélique Kidjo, Beninese singer-songwriter and Lutte Pour Le Changement (LUCHA), a youth movement committed to peaceful protest in Goma and Le Balai Citoyen, a political grassroots movement in Burkina Faso and Y'en a Marre, a group of Senegalese rappers and journalists
- 2017 - Alicia Keys, American musician and activist; the movement for rights for indigenous people in Canada
- 2018 - Colin Kaepernick, former NFL quarterback and activist; kneeling protest at racial injustice
- 2019 - Greta Thunberg, Swedish environment activist and the Fridays for Future Movement, part of School strike for climate
