= Lao royal family =

1904–1975 ruling family of the Kingdom of Laos

The royal standard

The Lan Xang Hom Khao dynasty (Lao: ລາຊະວົງລ້ານຊ້າງຮົ່ມຂາວ) or Lao royal family was the ruling family of the Kingdom of Laos from 1904 to 1975 and the group of close relatives of the monarch of the Kingdom of Laos. King Sisavang Vong was the founder of the modern family, consisting of a number of persons in the Lao royal dynasty of the Khun Lo, who are related to the king of Laos, who are entitled to royal titles, and some of whom performed various official engagements on behalf of the royal family and ceremonial duties of state when the kingdom existed. The Lao royal family are now based in France, where they work to achieve a change of government in Laos.

== Downfall ==
In 1975, the Pathet Lao, led by another royal, Souphanouvong, overthrew the Royal Government and arrested many members of the royal family. The King, the Queen, Crown Prince and the King's brothers were taken to a remote location to a re-education camp, where it is believed that they died, although there has been no official confirmation either way. In 1980 Prince Soulivong Savang, became head of the Royal House of Laos as Prince Sauryavong Savang was acting regent for his nephew, Vong Savang.

== Royal family ==
Members of the royal family include the king and queen (who are now deceased):

- King Savang Vatthana (1907–1977 or 1984)
- Queen Khamphoui (1909–1982)

Their children and grandchildren

- Crown Prince Vong Savang (1931–1979) and Crown Princess Mahneelai Panya (1939–)
  - Prince Soulivong Savang (1963–) and Princess Chandrasukra
  - Prince Thayavong Savang (1965–) and Princess Malika Khammao (1977–)
  - Princess Manisophana Savang (1965–) and Prince Saya Khamphhan Panya (1963–)
  - Princess Sawee Nahlee Savang (1967–) and Santi Inthavong (1961–)
  - Prince Kiranvong Savang (1969–)
  - Princess Manilama Savang (1977–)
  - Prince Anouratha Varman
- Princess Savivanh Savang (1933–2007) and Prince Sisumang Manivong (1927–)
- Prince Sisavang (1935–1978) and Princess Mekham Ratsami (1940–)
  - Prince Sayantha Sisavang (1969–)
  - Prince Bouneya Sisavang (1971–)
  - Prince Sathienna Sisavang
  - Prince Sui Sisavang
  - Princess Samiya Sisavang
  - Princess Lolita Sisavang
- Princess Thala Savang (1935–2006) and Prince Sisouphanouvong Sisaleumsak (1930–)
- Prince Sauryavong Savang (1937–2018) and Princess Dalavan (1944–)
  - Prince Southira Sauryavong Savang (1967–)
  - Prince Dayavant Sauryavong Savang (1969–)
  - Prince Balavant Sauryavong Savang (1972–)
  - Princess Krishnajina Sauryavong Savang (1974–)
  - Princess Mariana Gilnaji Savang (2001–)

== Royal styles and titles ==
The sovereign of the Kingdom of Laos is styled as Samdach Brhat Chao Maha Sri Vitha Lan Xang Hom Khao Phra Rajanachakra Lao Parama Sidha Khattiya Suriya Varman Brhat Maha Sri, while the consort of the sovereign is styled as Mahadevi or Samdach Brhat Rajini Akkhara Maha Sri.

The kings of Laos could marry a various number of wives (King Sisavang Vong married 15); and only women of royal birth could have the title Samdach Brhat Rajini Ekka Akkhara Maha Sri, if the king had more than one wife. If she was a commoner, her title was Mom. When there was a vice-king, they would be styled as the Uparaja, but since 1959, on the death of Prince Phetsarath Rattanavongsa, the position was abolished.

The crown prince and crown princess had the title of Anga Mahkuta Raja Kumara. If the sovereign has any sons, he will be given the style Anga Sadet Chao Fa Jaya and if any daughters, she will be styled as Anga Sadet Chao Fa Nying. If the crown prince has as a son he would be titled as Anga Sadet Chao Rajadhanadha, with the style of His Royal Highness.The daughters of the heir apparent would be styled as Anga Sadet Chao Nying Rajadhanadha, with the style of Her Royal Highness added to their title.

The princes are titled as Chao and princesses are titled as Chao Nying. In the southern provinces, they were titled as Chao Nang. If a prince marries a commoner, they would have the title Mom.

The other grandsons of the sovereign will be granted the title Sadet Chao and granddaughters of the sovereign would be styled as Sadet Chao Nying.

The other descendants of former sovereigns in the male line would be styled as Sadu Chao Jaya, with the style of His Highness, while female descendants of former sovereigns in the male line Sadu Chao Nying (with the style of Her Highness).

Other titles conferred on senior Princes of the Royal House, included the following, in order of precedence:
1. Samdach Chao Maha Upayuvaraja
2. Samdach Chao Maha Uparaja
3. Chao Raja Varman
4. Chao Raja Putra
5. Chao Raja Mabanda Varman
6. Chao Raja Mabanda
7. Chao Raja Baktinaya

== See also ==
- List of monarchs of Laos
- Royal Lao Government in Exile
