= History of Laos (1945–present) =

Facet of the history of Laos

This article details the history of Laos from 1945 to the present.

Note: this article follows the system for transliterating Lao names used in Martin Stuart-Fox's History of Laos. It may differ from systems used in other articles.

== Kingdom of Laos ==
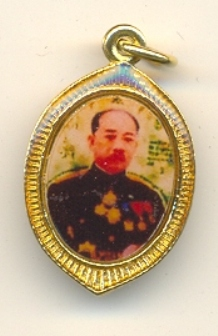
Good-luck charms of Prince Phetxarāt, who many Lao believe possessed magical powers, are widely sold in Laos today.

On 27 August 1945 Prince Phetxarāt took charge of Viang Chan (Vientiane) from the Japanese, although as Prime Minister of Luang Phrabāng he had no authority outside the Kingdom's borders. The French were already in control of Luang Phrabāng, and with the support of the Prince of Champāsak they were also regaining control in the south. When it became clear that the King would not budge from his loyalty to France, Phetxarāt (who had no fondness for the King and the Crown Prince) unilaterally declared the unification of the country, nominally under the crown of Luang Phrabāng, and then declared Lao independence.

In September the Chinese Army arrived to find that a Lao government of sorts was in command of Viang Chan. Uncertain what to do, the Chinese commander recognised Phetxarāt, and in Luang Phrabāng the Chinese disarmed the French forces. But the Allied governments refused to recognise Phetxarāt's government, and in October de Gaulle advised the King by telegram to dismiss him as Prime Minister of Luang Phrabāng. In retaliation, Phetxarāt declared the King deposed.

Phetxarāt put his younger half-brother Suphānuvong in charge of organising the defence of the new independent Laos with the titles Minister of Defence and Interior. Suphānuvong was married to a Vietnamese and had spent most of the war in Vietnam, where he had become a close supporter and ally of Ho Chi Minh. On his advice Ho's forces supported Phetxarāt's government, but they could spare few forces from the struggle against the French in Vietnam, which was always their first priority. Phetxarāt's brother Suvannaphūmā became Minister for Public Works. Among those who came from Vietnam with Suphānuvong was Kaisôn Phomvihān, half-Vietnamese and a dedicated communist, who in time became the leader of the Lao communists and Vietnam's principal agent in Laos. Thus by the end of 1945 all the leaders of the next 30 years of political conflict were in place.

But the pretensions of the Lao Issara government were largely illusory. Only the presence of the Chinese army in occupation of the northern half of the country was preventing the French from attacking Viang Chan from their base in the south of the country. Thailand and the Allies were suspicious of the apparent role of communists in the government, although in reality this was very slight. In March 1946 the Chinese were finally persuaded to stop plundering the country and go home, and this was the signal for the French to advance to Savannakhēt.

Suphānuvong led his motley forces to meet the French before they got to Viang Chan, but at Thākhaek they were routed, and Suphānuvong himself badly wounded. The Lao Issara government fled to Thailand and set up a government in exile in Bangkok. On 24 April the French occupied Viang Chan, and in mid May they arrived in Luang Phrabāng to rescue the grateful King. As a reward for his loyalty, in August the French proclaimed him King of Laos. The Principality of Champāsak was abolished, and Prince Bunūm na Champāsak compensated with the title Inspector-General of the Kingdom.

=== French make a late effort to upgrade Laos ===
The French now made a belated effort to give Laos the institutions of a modern state. The Garde Indigène was replaced by a Lao National Guard, and a Lao police force established. Elections for a Constituent Assembly, on the basis of universal male suffrage, were held in December 1946, and in 1947 the Assembly adopted a constitution confirming the status of Laos as a constitutional monarchy and an "autonomous state" within the French Union. A senior high school was opened in Viang Chan, and new schools opened in Pākxē, Savannakhēt and Luang Phrabāng.

New hospitals and clinics were also established, although there was an acute shortage of qualified staff for them. A crash program to train more Lao civil servants was also instituted. In August 1947 elections were held for the National Assembly, and 35 deputies were elected. A royal relative, Prince Suvannarāt, became Prime Minister of Laos at the head of a cabinet composed entirely of members of influential Lao-Lum families. This was to remain a characteristic of Lao politics. Various transient political parties came and went, but the same 20-odd families alternated in office, feuding with each other over the spoils of office.

=== Laos gains independence (1950) ===
In 1949, as the French position in Vietnam worsened and the continuing goodwill of the Lao became more important, further concessions were made. Lao ministers took control of all government functions except foreign affairs and defence, although the almost total dependence of the economy on French aid made this new independence more apparent than real. In February 1950, Laos was formally declared an independent state, and was recognised as such by the United States and Great Britain.

Laos applied to join the United Nations, but its application was vetoed by the Soviet Union. None of these measures disguised the fact that France remained in essential control of the country. Foreign affairs, defence and finance remained under de facto French control, and justice was only slowly devolved to Lao ministers. Most importantly, the French Army retained the right to operate freely in Laos, and to issue orders to Lao forces without reference to Lao ministers.

Meanwhile, the Lao Issara government-in-exile planned a nationalist revolt against the French and what they saw as their Lao puppets in Viang Chan. For a time the Lao Issara forces, under the command of Suphānuvong, were able to operate from bases in Thailand, and achieved some successes, particularly around Savannakhēt. But in November 1947 a military coup in Bangkok brought Marshall Phibun back to power. Encouraged by the Americans, he sought to repair Thailand's relations with France, and shut down the Lao Issara bases. The Lao Issara could now only mount operations into Laos from territory controlled by the Vietnamese Communists, but this came at a political price which the non-communist Lao Issara leaders, Phetxarāt and Suvannaphūmā, were not prepared to pay.

In January 1949 Lao Communists led by Kaisôn established a new Communist-controlled Lao military force in Vietnam, nominally loyal to the Lao Issara government but in fact answerable to the Indochinese Communist Party. Suphānuvong sided with the Communists over control of this new force, and this led rapidly to a split in the Lao Issara. In July 1949 the non-communist leaders of the Lao Issara declared the government-in-exile dissolved, and most of its members, led by Suvannaphūmā, returned to Laos under an amnesty. Only Phetxarāt remained in exile, but by now he had lost his previous influence. In August 1951, Suvannaphūmā became Prime Minister for the first time, confirming his status as the new leader of the non-communist Lao.

== Communism in Laos ==
The Indochinese Communist Party (ICP) was founded by Ho Chi Minh and others in Hong Kong in 1930. Its membership was at first entirely Vietnamese, but, as its name indicates, it was given responsibility by the Communist International in Moscow for the whole of French Indochina. During the 1930s it recruited a handful of Lao members, mainly teachers and other middle-ranking civil servants with some western education. In terms of social structure, Laos offered few opportunities for orthodox communist agitation theory. It had few wage labourers apart from some in the tin-mining industry.

There was no "agrarian question" in Laos: more than 90 percent of Lao were rice-farmers who owned their own land. There were no landlords as in China and no landless rural proletariat. The only leadership positions in the Free Laos Front. These included Faidāng Lôbliayao, a leader of the Hmong people of the north, and Sīthon Kommadam, son of the southern rebel Ong Kommadam and a leader of the southern Lao-Thoeng.

Nevertheless, by the late 1940s the ICP had recruited a core of activists, some of them part-Vietnamese, such as Kaisôn, others married to Vietnamese, such as Nūhak Phumsavan. The discrediting of the French and the failure of the Lao Issara government gave them their opportunity, because after 1949 the struggle against colonial rule could only be carried on from bases in Vietnam and with the support of the Vietnamese communists.

In August 1950 the communists established a "front" organisation, the Free Laos Front (Naeo Lao Issara), under the presidency of Suphānuvong. This in turn formed a "Resistance Government of the Lao Homeland." The phrase Pathēt Lao ("Lao Homeland") thus became established as the general name of the Lao communist movement until 1975. The communists shrewdly promoted representatives of the upland ethnic minorities to leadership positions in the Free Laos Front. These included Faidāng Lôbliayao, a leader of the Hmong people of the north, and Sīthon Kommadam, son of the southern rebel Ong Kommadam and a leader of the southern Lao-Thoeng. Since the communist base areas were mainly inhabited by ethnic minority peoples, this helped consolidate support in these areas. But the communist leadership remained firmly in Lao-Lum hands. When in 1955 a separate Lao communist party was created (the Lao People's Revolutionary Party or Phak Paxāxon Lao), with Kaisôn as General Secretary and Nūhak as his deputy, all the members of the Politburo were Lao-Lum.

The Lao communist party remained under the supervision of the Vietnamese party, and throughout the following twenty years of warfare the Pathēt Lao was dependent on Vietnam for arms, money and training. A large number of Vietnamese forces fought alongside the Pathēt Lao, and Vietnamese "advisers" usually accompanied Pathēt Lao military commanders. The anti-communist Lao government always accused the Pathēt Lao of being Vietnamese puppets, but this was an over-simplification.

The Lao and Vietnamese communists were fighting for the same goals - first the eviction of the French, then the establishment of socialism, and the Lao knew they could not achieve either of these objectives on their own. Communist ideology taught that "proletarian internationalism" was a duty of all communists. The Lao communists freely accepted Vietnamese leadership as the quickest and indeed only way to achieve their aims.

Even after they had overthrown the government, the Pathēt Lao depended on Vietnamese soldiers and political advisers to keep control of the country. Their government had a relationship with Vietnam similar to that of the Eastern European Communist governments to the Soviet Union. The price they paid for Vietnamese support was the hostility of the majority of the Lao-Lum, who disliked the Vietnamese more than they did the French. It was not until the later 1960s that the Pathēt Lao began to gain support in the Lao-Lum areas.

== Geneva and the first coalition (1954) ==
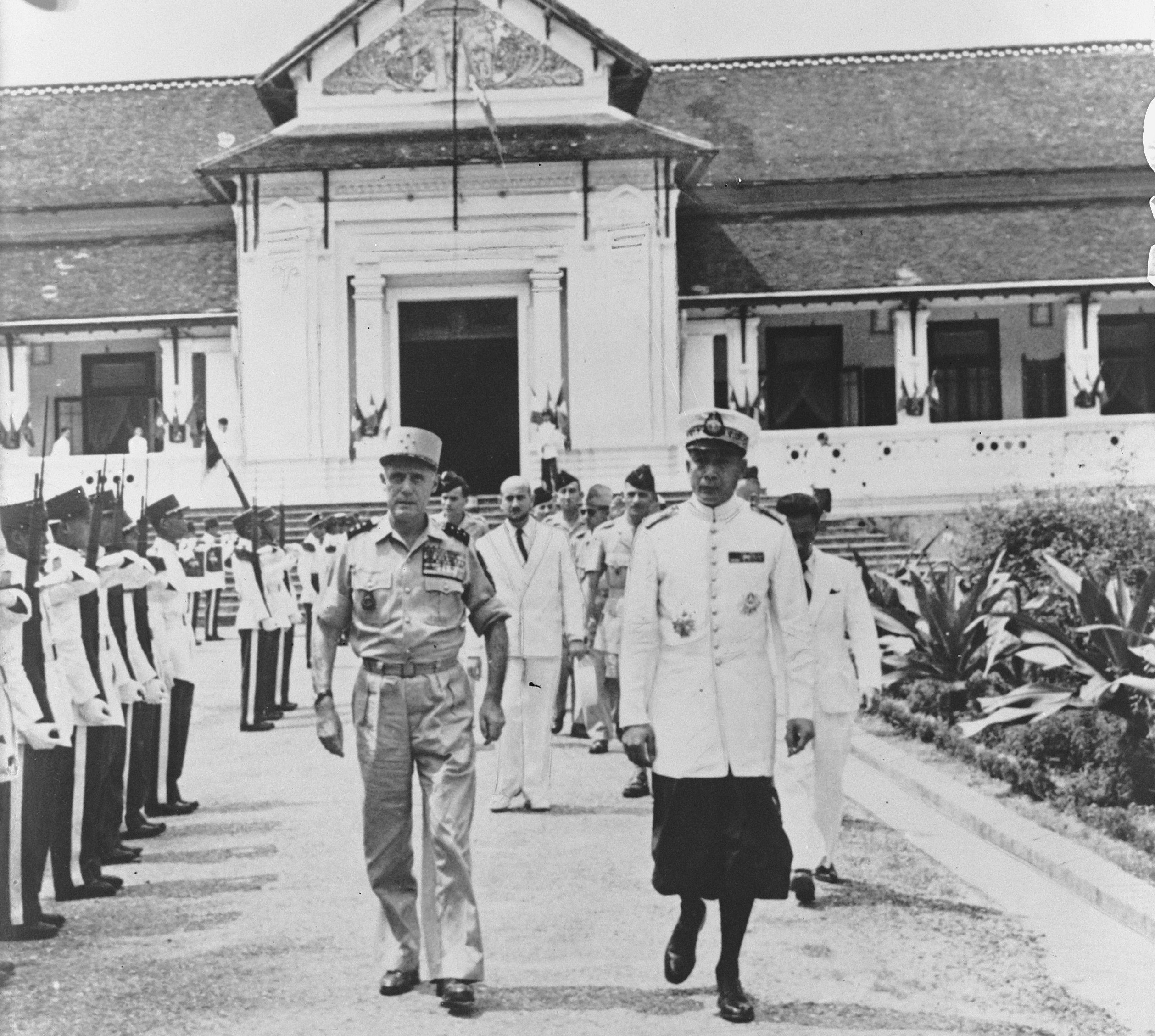
French General Salan and Prince Sisavang Vatthana in Luang Prabang, 4 May 1953

The early 1950s saw continuing instability in the Lao government in Viang Chan. The influx of French forces, accompanied by much French and American aid money, fuelled an economic boom, accompanied by high inflation, in the towns, but this did little to benefit the peasant majority. The diversion of funds to military purposes retarded development of fields like health and education. The government remained weak and faction-ridden, and also increasingly corrupt as leading politicians found ways for themselves and their relatives to profit from the foreign money pouring into the country. Suvannaphūmā remained the leading non-communist politician and retained the confidence of the King, but right-wingers, led by Bunūm na Champāsak, opposed his policy of coalition and reconciliation with the Pathēt Lao. Nevertheless, Lao independence, at first a facade for continued French rule, gradually became a reality.

In 1953 the country obtained full independence from France, but the Pathēt Lao, with Vietnamese aid, had gained control over a large area of territory, albeit thinly populated, in the mountainous areas along the Vietnamese border, and also over some areas in the south, where rule from Viang Chan had never been popular. The decline of French power left the Royal Lao government vulnerable, and Pathēt Lao and Vietnamese forces advanced to within 30 km of Luang Phrabāng.

As the French became increasingly bogged down in Vietnam, political opposition in France to the Indochina war grew stronger. In May 1954 the French suffered a defeat at Dien Bien Phu in northern Vietnam which, while of no great consequence militarily, was a political disaster. The French government resigned and Pierre Mendès-France became prime minister on a policy of getting out of Indochina. An international conference on Indochina had already been convened in Geneva, and as it met it was confronted with the new situation following Dien Bien Phu.

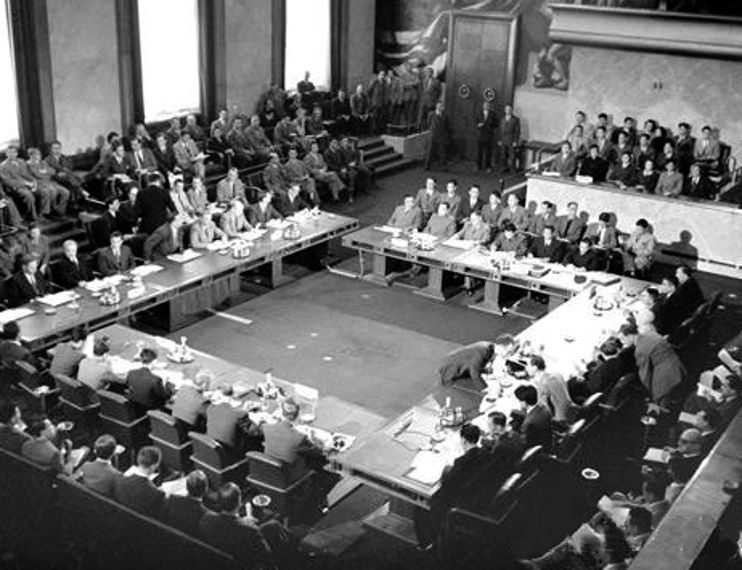
The Geneva Conference of 1954.

Laos was a secondary issue at Geneva, and the decisions made about Laos were dictated by the settlement in Vietnam. Foreign Minister Phuy Xananikôn represented the Lao government and Nūhak represented the Pathēt Lao (as part of the Vietnamese communist delegation), but they were little more than observers of decisions made by the great powers. It was agreed to make Laos an independent, neutral country with a coalition government representing all parties including the Pathēt Lao.

A ceasefire was to be concluded, and this was to be followed by the withdrawal of all foreign forces, the disbanding of the Pathēt Lao army, the formation of a coalition government, and free elections. When news of this agreement reached Laos, there was violent anger among anti-communist politicians, which focused on Phuy for having agreed to these terms. In September a gang funded by right-wing elements attempted to assassinate Phuy. He was slightly wounded, but Defence Minister Ku Vôravong was killed. The resultant crisis forced Suvannaphūmā to resign, and Katay Don Sasorith formed a new government.

=== After the Geneva conference ===
Two months after the Geneva conference, North Vietnam began plotting against the government of Laos. A military organisation was created called Group 100. Its headquarters was established at Ban Namèo. Its purpose was to organise, train, direct and supply the army of the Pathēt Lao. North Vietnam had no particular interest in the Geneva Conference or in the creating a neutral Laos other than in their use in strengthening their grip on the eastern portions of the country. According to the Geneva Accords in article 13, the cessation of hostile outsiders granted for the withdrawal of the foreign forces - the French and Vietnamese volunteer units - from Laos. This part of the agreement, in accordance with Article 4a were to be completed within 120 days.

Katāy was a much less subtle figure than Suvannaphūmā, and he found the task of implementing the Geneva agreements beyond him. The essential problem was that although the French forces departed on schedule, the Vietnamese forces supporting the Pathēt Lao in their upland base areas did not, and the Lao government had no means of forcing them to do so. Under the agreements, the Pathēt Lao forces were supposed to assemble in Houaphan and Phongsālī provinces before disbanding.

Instead the Pathēt Lao and the Vietnamese continued to treat these provinces as their own "liberated areas," refusing to allow government officials to exercise authority, and also evicting the local Hmong forces which had supported the French and were now loyal to the Lao government. They also maintained their underground forces in the south.

After a year of stalemate, the government went ahead with elections in the rest of the country in December 1955. After the elections Katāy's government was defeated in the new National Assembly, and Suvannaphūmā returned to office, still determined to create a neutralist coalition government. Suvannaphūmā always believed that the Lao, if left alone, could settle their own differences, and that he could come to an agreement with his half-brother Suphānuvong.

The United States did not ratify the Geneva agreements, and the Eisenhower administration, particularly the militantly anti-communist Secretary of State, John Foster Dulles, shared the views of the right-wing Lao politicians. Under Dulles's influence the US had backed the French war in Vietnam, and now that the French were leaving he was determined that the US would take over France's role of supporting anti-communist forces in Vietnam and preventing Ho Chi Minh's forces taking over southern Vietnam. This, he believed, necessitated maintaining an anti-communist government in Laos and preventing Vietnam using Laos as a transport route to south Vietnam.

To get around the prohibitions of the Geneva agreements – which the United States had pledged to honour – the US Department of Defense in December 1955 established a disguised military mission in Vientiane called the Programs Evaluation Office (PEO). The PEO became operational on 13 December 1955 and worked under the cover of the civilian aid mission and was staffed by military personnel and headed by a general officer, all of whom wore civilian clothes and had been removed from Department of Defense rosters of active service personnel.

Over the 1955-61 period, the PEO gradually supplanted the French military mission in providing equipment and training to the Royal Lao Army and the anti-communist Hmong Tribe. In this way, the US was footing the entire cost of keeping the Royal Lao Army in the field in the same way that the Soviets and Vietnamese footed the entire cost of the Pathēt Lao, and the Central Intelligence Agency (CIA) was providing intelligence and political direction. The US therefore strongly opposed Suvannaphūmā's efforts to bring the Pathēt Lao into the government and to make Laos a "neutral" country. What neutrality meant in practice was allowing permanent Vietnamese occupation of the east of the country and allowing the Pathēt Lao to keep their army in the field. Suvannaphūmā's efforts to settle the conflict in Laos always failed due to the refusal of the Vietnamese to leave and the refusal of the Pathēt Lao to disarm.

In August 1956 Suvannaphūmā reached an agreement with Suphānuvong. He was helped by his elder brother Prince Phetxarāt, who returned to Laos in 1956 after ten years in exile, and played the role of mediator and elder statesman until his death in 1959. A coalition government was formed in which Suphānuvong became Minister for Planning and Reconstruction, and another Pathēt Lao leader, Phūmī Vongvichit (1909–94) was Minister for Religion and Fine Arts. The Pathēt Lao agreed to allow the reintegration of Houaphan and Phongsālī provinces, and to integrate the Pathēt Lao army into the Royal Lao Army. Guarantees were given that Laos would be a neutral country and would not allow its territory to be used as a base for aggression against any of its neighbours. The coalition government formally took office in November, and in May 1958 reasonably free elections were held, at which the Pathēt Lao won nine seats in the National Assembly out of 21 contested. Suphānuvong won the Viang Chan seat with the highest vote of any candidate in the country.

The 1956 agreement was welcomed by France, Britain, the Soviet Union, China and both Vietnamese governments. The US was muted in its opposition, and did not carry out previous threats to cut off aid if the Pathēt Lao joined the government. But behind the scenes the US embassy continued to encourage anti-communist Lao politicians to question the agreement. The Vietnamese and Lao communists also had no intention of honouring the spirit of the 1956 agreement, which they saw in purely tactical terms.

Some Pathēt Lao weapons were handed over, and two battalions of Pathēt Lao troops were nominally designated as units of the Royal Lao Army. The bulk of the Pathēt Lao forces, led by Kaisôn, withdrew to bases on the Vietnamese border to await developments. The Vietnamese also continued to use the mountains of the frontier zone as a safe haven and transport route (later known as the Ho Chi Minh trail).

Suvannaphūmā turned a blind eye to this rather than risk the unity of his government, but the CIA was fully aware of these facts. US aid, directed by the US Agency for International Aid (USAID), continued at the rate of US$40 million a year (in a country of 3 million people), but deliberately bypassed Suphānuvong's Ministry for Planning and Reconstruction and was channelled to the Army and friendly politicians.

== North Vietnamese invasion (1958–1959) ==
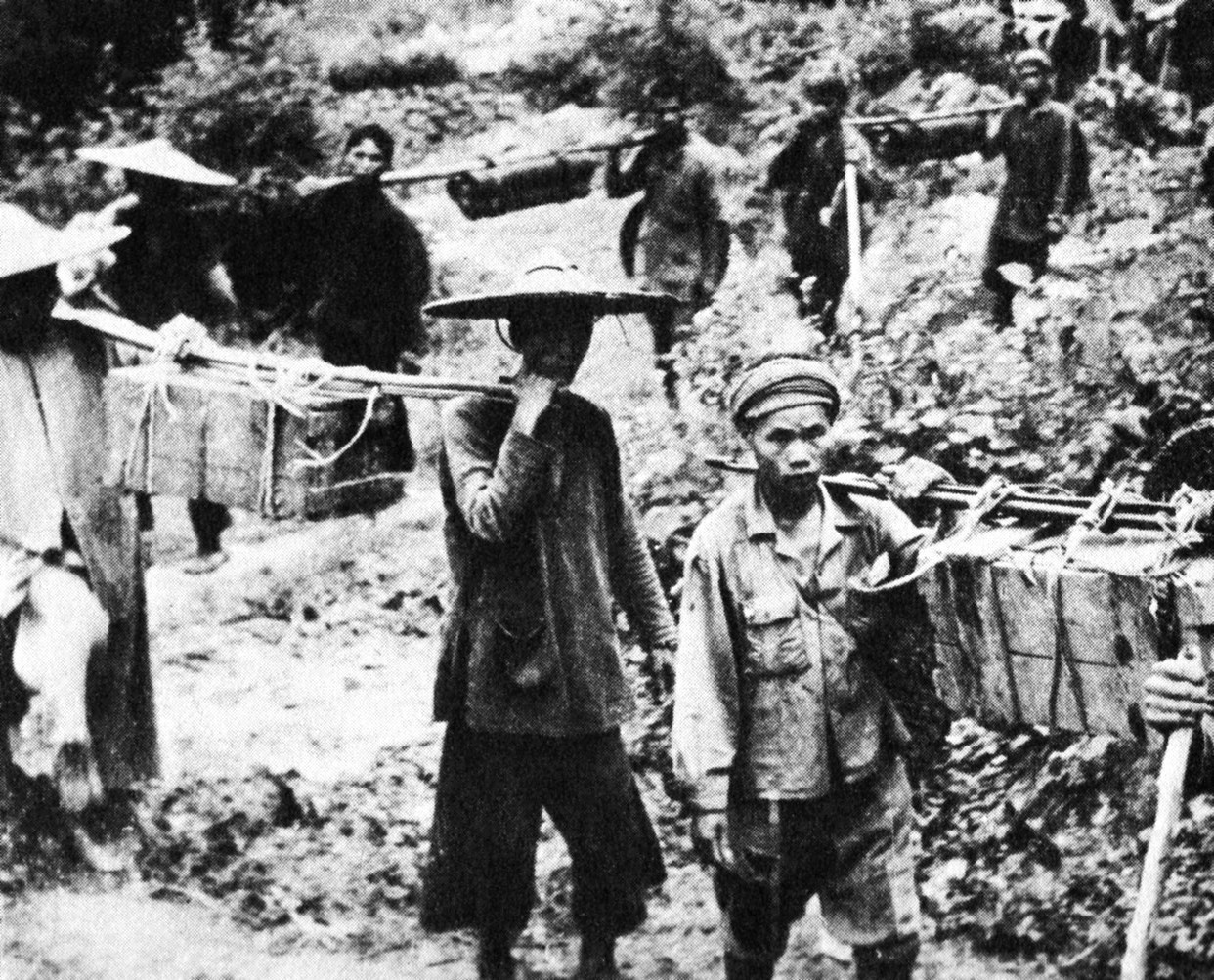
The Ho Chi Minh trail from the very beginning was using Vietnamese and Laotian people as seen in a captured Vietcong's photo, circa 1959

In December 1958, North Vietnamese Army units crossed into Laos and took by force several villages in Xépôn District. As contrasted to their other occupations, in this instance North Vietnam began flying their flag over the territory and officially announced it was part of Vietnam. Though the government was granted extraordinary powers to deal with the crisis by the National Assembly, it did nothing. And in doing nothing, it lost much of its credibility with the patriotic parties.

In July 1959, the North Vietnamese army increased its participation in attacks on government forces. The attacks usually took the form of North Vietnamese regulars attacking a defended position, overcoming most of the resistance and then letting their Pathēt Lao allies claim the victory by occupying the position. Two months later, North Vietnam created a new organisation known as Group 959 located inside Laos at Na Kai. Group 959 became in effect the Vietnamese supreme command controlling, organising and equipping the Pathet Lao. The group would continue to exist until 1968 when it was rendered redundant through the takeover by North Vietnam's army of the war inside Laos.

Partly as a result of corruption in the distribution of international aid, and partly because of the venal and unreliable character of many Lao politicians, Suvannaphūmā's government soon ran into difficulties. The US and other aid donors insisted on currency reform to stem the runaway inflation which they themselves had caused by pumping money into such an underdeveloped economy. Suvannaphūmā resisted, fearing the effect that devaluation would have on the Lao people.

In August 1958 the US suspended aid payments, which the anti-coalition and opportunist forces in the Assembly took as a signal to bring down Suvannaphūmā. Following his resignation Phuy Xananikôn, who now had the support of the US Embassy, again became prime minister, and the Pathēt Lao ministers were not re-appointed. The new Defence Minister was Phūmī Nôsavan, a right-winger closely aligned with the Americans. Under his command the army once again became an anti-communist force. The two ex-Pathēt Lao battalions immediately reverted to the Pathēt Lao.

In December Phuy partly suspended the constitution and began to rule under emergency powers, which he used to purge Pathēt Lao supporters from the civil service, and to arrest Suphānuvong and the other Pathēt Lao leaders in Viang Chan. In July 1959 fighting soon broke out all over the country. At this juncture the elderly King Sīsavāngvong died and was succeeded by his son Savāngvatthanā, who was as pro-American as his father had been pro-French, and well known for his prophecy that he would be the last King of Laos.

The occupation by North Vietnamese security forces in December 1958 of several villages in Xépôn District near the Demilitarised Zone (DMZ) between North Vietnam and South Vietnam was an ominous development. The Laos Government immediately protested the flying of the North Vietnamese flag on Laotian territory. Hanoi claimed the villages had historically been part of Vietnam.

With regard to precedent, this was a decidedly modest claim - nonetheless, it represented a unilateral reinterpretation of the French map used by the Truong Gia Armistice Commission in the summer of 1954 to draw the DMZ, and, backed by force of arms, constituted nothing less than aggression. Phoui received extraordinary powers from the National Assembly to deal with the crisis. But the failure to regain their lost territory rankled the Laotian nationalists, who were hoping for a greater degree of United States support.

Fighting broke out all along the border with North Vietnam. North Vietnamese regular army units participated in attacks on 28–31 July 1959. These operations established a pattern of North Vietnamese forces leading the attack on a strong point, then falling back and letting the Pathet Lao remain in place once resistance to the advance had been broken. The tactic had the advantage of concealing from view the North Vietnamese presence. Rumors of North Vietnamese in the vicinity often had a terrifying effect, however. Among the men who heard such rumours in the mountains of Houaphan Province that summer was a young Royal Lao Army captain named Kong Le. Kong Le had two companies of the Second Paratroop Battalion out on patrol almost on the North Vietnamese border. When they returned to Xam Nua without encountering the enemy, they found that the garrison had decamped, leaving the town undefended.

The Vietnamese party's strategy was by now decided with regard to South Vietnam. At the same time, the party outlined a role for the LPP that was supportive of North Vietnam, in addition to the LPP's role as leader of the revolution in Laos. Hanoi's southern strategy opened the first tracks through the extremely rugged terrain of Xépôn district in mid-1959 of what was to become the Ho Chi Minh Trail.

== Failure of neutralism (1960-1964) ==
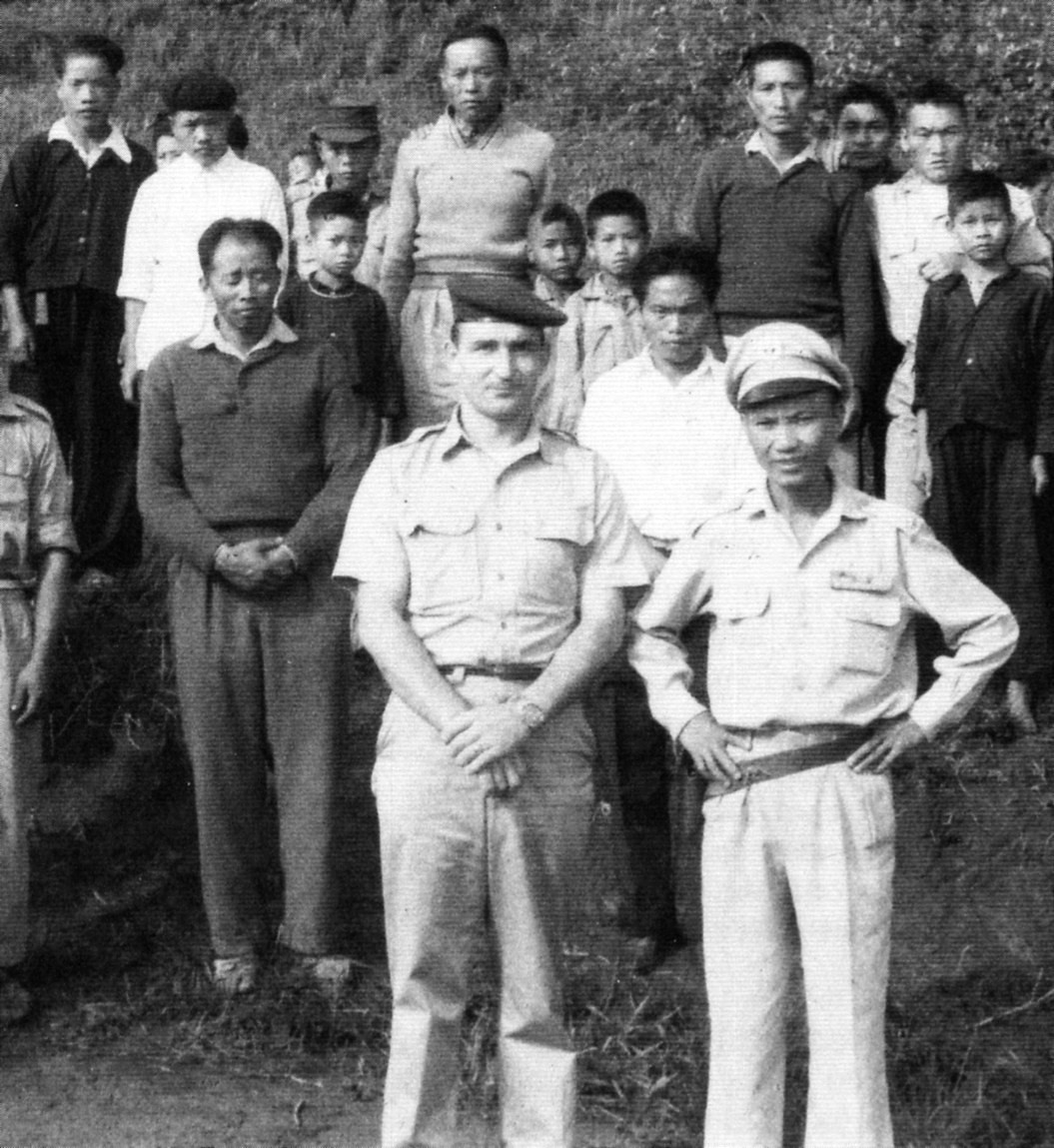
The Laotian Armed Forces training Centre at Khang Khai, Laos, March 1960

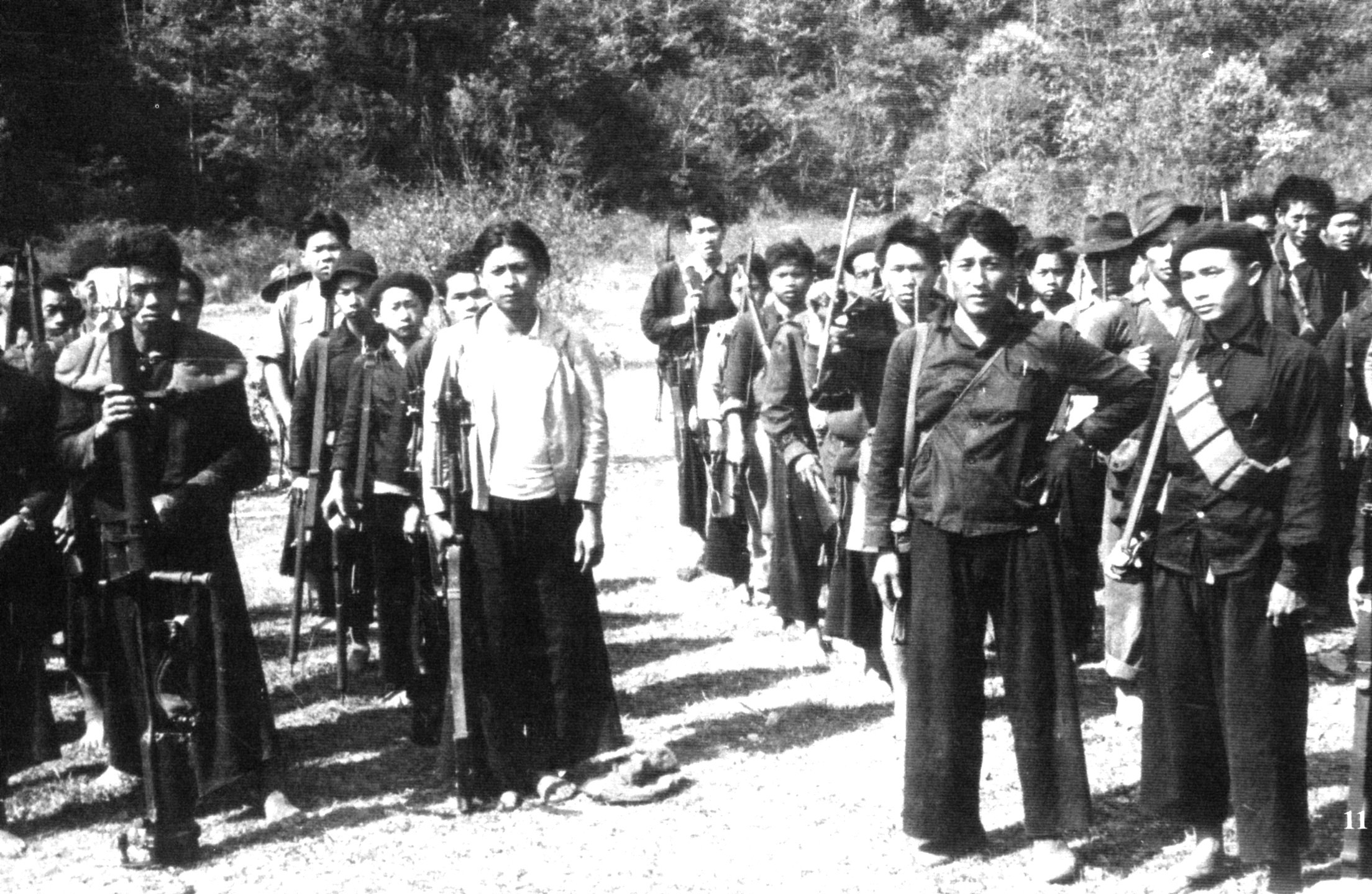
Anti-communist Hmong guerrilla troops in 1961.

Despite its repression of the Pathēt Lao, Phuy's government did not give the right-wingers the sort of power they wanted, and in December Phūmī Nôsavan staged Laos's first military coup. Viang Chan was occupied and Phuy arrested, but Phūmī was forced to back down when the King, at the urging of western ambassadors, refused to appoint him Prime Minister. A compromise was reached whereby a royal relative, Prince Somsanit Vongkotrattana, became nominal Prime Minister while Phūmī remained Defence Minister and became the real power in the government.

The new government was at once embarrassed by the dramatic escape of Suphānuvong and the other Pathēt Lao leaders from prison - they had converted their guards, who fled with them to Vietnam. The government was also opposed by elements of the army which continued to support Suvannaphūmā and his neutralist policies.

On 9 August 1960, led by Captain Kông Lae, they staged a lightning coup, demanding that the National Assembly meet and reinstate Suvannaphūmā. Faced with an angry mob supporting the coup, the Assembly complied, and Suvannaphūmā formed his third government. The PEO was immediately evacuated by Air America. In an attempt to neutralise right-wing opposition, Suvannaphūmā offered to include Phūmī Nôsavan in the new government, but instead Phūmī went south to join Bunūm na Champāsak in forming an anti-communist "Revolutionary Committee" with US backing.

Kông's coup split the army, with some garrisons supporting him and some supporting Phūmī. Since the Americans were paying the army's bills, however, Kông's units could not sustain themselves for long, and had no choice but to seek an alliance with the Pathēt Lao, a move which Suvannaphūmā supported in dramatic fashion by flying to the Pathēt Lao headquarters at Xam Neua in the mountains to issue a joint appeal with Suphānuvong for Lao unity and neutralism. This was a great propaganda coup for the Pathēt Lao, and led to a renewed Pathēt Lao - Vietnamese advance which soon occupied most of the north and east of the country.

For the first time the Pathēt Lao began receiving substantial Soviet military and financial aid, and Soviet advisors appeared in Laos. For the US, this was a signal for all-out war. Massive aid was sent to Phūmī and Bunūm in the south, and in October they advanced towards Viang Chan. A quorum of the National Assembly met at Savnannakhēt and declared Suvannaphūmā deposed and replaced by Bunūm. In December the rightist army reached Viang Chan and after three days heavy fighting, in which about 500 people were killed, took the city. Suvannaphūmā fled to Cambodia, while Kông's forces withdrew to the Pathēt Lao areas, which now took in a large portion of the country.

At this point the international political climate changed with the end of the Eisenhower Administration and the inauguration of John F. Kennedy. The Kennedy Administration took the view that American interests were best served by ending the Lao conflict through the enforcement of the Geneva agreements of 1956, a policy Kennedy agreed on at his summit with Nikita Khrushchev in Vienna in June 1961. As a result, the Geneva conference reconvened, but both the Americans and the Soviets had some trouble getting their "puppets" to agree to compromise. Phūmī and Bunūm rightly feared that any agreement would rob them of their military victory and bring the despised Suvannaphūmā back to power. It took serious threats from the US Embassy and the Thai military to force their compliance.

The Pathēt Lao believed they were on the verge of conquering the whole country, and late 1961 they began an offensive in Luang Namthā province which soon routed Phūmī's forces. Communist discipline held and they agreed to a compromise in which they had no real faith. In June Suvannaphūmā, Suphānuvong and Bunūm met in the Plain of Jars and agreed to a government of eleven neutralists, four rightists and four Pathēt Lao. Bunūm retired from politics, and Suphānuvong and Phūmī became deputy prime ministers in Suvannaphūmā's fourth government, which took office in June 1962 with the support of all the powers.

Even before the Second Coalition government took office, however, its principal sponsors in the US were losing faith in its value. As the Vietnam War began to escalate, the use of the Ho Chi Minh trail as a supply route from North Vietnam to the communist forces in the south increased, and it became obvious that the Vietnamese had no intention of withdrawing their forces from Laos as they had twice agreed at Geneva to do.

For North Vietnam, the use of Lao territory was a strategic necessity, and not something on which they would compromise. Agreements meant nothing to them. Further, they had no particular respect for the idea of an independent Laos. By late 1962 it was therefore also becoming a necessity for the US to prevent this. The Soviets and Vietnamese continued to openly aid to the Pathēt Lao, while the US continued to arm and train Hmong irregular forces under Vang Pao in the Plain of Jars. There was no attempt to reintegrate the Pathēt Lao areas with the rest of Laos, and the Pathēt Lao did not even pretend to disarm their forces.

The neutralist forces, commanded by Kông, agreed to accept US aid, which caused a split within the neutralist ranks, with some going over to the Pathēt Lao. By April 1963 fighting had broken out again in the Plain of Jars. By the end of the year fighting was widespread, the Pathēt Lao was again advancing, and the neutralists were being squeezed out as a political and military force. In April 1964 there was another attempt at a rightist coup, led by General Kupasit Athai, commander of the Viang Chan garrison and an ally of Phūmī. Suvannaphūmā was briefly arrested, but when the Americans refused support to the coup it collapsed, but the Pathēt Lao ministers left the capital and did not return, effectively ending the Coalition government.

=== Conflict ===
The conflict was divided into five military regions:

- Military Region I at Luang Prabang was dominated by the royal family and the former commander in Chief of the Royal Laos Army, General Oune Rathikul. The region commander was Brigadier General Tiao Say~vong, a half brother of the king. The region was located in northwest Laos and covered four provinces: Phong Saly, Houa Khong, Sayaboury and Luang Prabang.
- Military Region II, in the northeastern section of Laos, was under Major General Vang P.ao, the Hmong guerilla war hero of Laos. It covered two provinces: Houa Phan (Samneua), and Xieng Khouang. The headquarters was at Long Cheng, northwest of the Plain of Jars.
- Military Region III in central Laos was headquartered at Savannakhet and covered two provinces; Khammouane (Thakitek) and Savannakhet. This region was commanded by General Bounpon and later by Brigadier General Nouphet Dao Heuang, in July 1971. The real power in this region was the Insixiengmay family led by Minister Leuam Insixiengmay, Vice Premier and Minister of Education. (His wife is elder sister of mother bouanphan who is a wife of Chao Boun oum na champasack).
- Military Region IV, with headquarters at Pakse, included the six provinces of southern Laos: Saravane, Attopeu, Champassak, Sedone, Khong Sedone, and Sithandone (Khong Island). It was dominated by the Nachampassak family led by Prince Boun Oum Nachampassak. The commander of Military Region IV was Major General Phasouk S. Rassaphak, a member of the Champassak family. He commanded this area for almost a decade and a half until finally replaced by the author, Brigadier General Soutchay Vongsavanh, in July 1971.
- Military Region V contained Borikhane and Vientiane Provinces, the capital province of Laos, was headquartered at Chinaimo Army Camp and was led by Major General Kouprasith Abhay until he was replaced by Brigadier General Thongligh Chokbeng Boun in July 1971.

== Laotian Civil War (1953–75) ==
Between 1964 and 1968 the conflict in Laos was essentially between the US-supported government forces and the Pathēt Lao, backed by North Vietnam. The Pathēt Lao in these years was not a real threat to the government. The real problem for the government was corruption and warlordism within the national army. Regional army commanders did not co-operate with each other effectively and spent more time on political manoeuvres than on fighting the Pathēt Lao. Suvannaphūmā continued to argue for a neutralised Laos, and both sides paid lip-service to this ideal, but neither was prepared to yield any part of its strategic position to achieve it. In particular, the North Vietnamese had no intention of withdrawing any part of their army from the areas of the country it occupied.

Suvannaphūmā remained in office despite frequent threats to resign. The US no longer bothered opposing his neutralist views because, as the paymasters of the Lao army, they could ignore him. The North Vietnamese on the other hand consider Laos an underdeveloped neighbour that needed their guidance and continued in their attempts to topple the government.

In 1968 the North Vietnamese army moved the Pathēt Lao forces aside and took over the fighting of the war. In January, North Vietnam sent its 316th Division forward toward the Nambac Valley, where seven of the government's best military units were located. The valley was surrounded and pounded with artillery until the base eventually fell. The battle effectively ended the role of the Royal Lao Army for the next several years. While the Pathēt Lao were an ineffective force, the North Vietnamese army with its Soviet-provided field artillery and tanks was beyond anything that the Lao Army could deal with. The government disbanded all its forces greater than the size of a battalion and disengaged from the conflict.

Between 1968 and 1973 the war in Laos escalated. It became a battlefield in the war between the United States and North Vietnam. The CIA trained Hmong militias and Thai Army forces, on the government side, and the North Vietnamese Army with the assistance of the Pathēt Lao, on the communist side. The country was divided into two zones: one - comprising about two-thirds of Laos but containing only about a quarter of its population - effectively controlled by North Vietnam and its allies, and the other - consisting of little more than the Mekong Valley but containing most of the Lao population - effectively controlled by the government backed by the US.

The Pathēt Lao, for reasons discussed earlier, were willing collaborators in the Vietnamese control of their zone of operations. They knew that the only way they could hope to take power in Laos was via the power of the North Vietnamese. While it is often said that Laos was a vital supply route for North Vietnam, the reality was not quite so tidy. Portions of Southern Laos were useful to North Vietnam, but North Vietnam occupied large sections of the country that had nothing to do with supply routes.

=== US objectives ===
The US objective in Laos was to push government control as far eastward as practical. It sought to prevent the North Vietnamese and Pathēt Lao forces holding the Plain of Jars. After 1968, the US accomplished this mainly through Vang Pao's Hmong militia and massive bombing of communist positions. The other US objectives were intelligence gathering and interruption of North Vietnam's use of the Ho Chi Minh trail, and for this it relied on air power. During this period Laos was bombed more heavily than any other country ever has been in history: much infrastructure in the Pathēt Lao zone was destroyed and many were made refugees. The North Vietnamese objectives were more complicated. Their primary goal was to keep the Ho Chi Minh trail in the south open, and to prevent the US using Laos as a base for raids into North Vietnam. The war degenerated into the two sides pushing each other into or out of the Plain of Jars.

In 1969 Richard Nixon became President of the US and began the long process of winding down the Vietnam War and finding a political settlement. But this brought no immediate draw-down in Laos. The new administration pursued the same goals by the same means, and in fact during 1969 and 1970 the bombing campaign against the North Vietnamese and Pathet Lao increased in intensity. In the spring of 1969 the North Vietnamese attempted to hold the Plain of Jars through the rainy season. This led to a coordinated campaign that lead to a disastrous defeat of the North Vietnamese. Under constant pressure, their resistance collapsed in the Plain of Jars. They abandoned millions of dollars' worth of military equipment and were chased almost to the North Vietnamese border. The success however was short-lived. The North Vietnamese launched a two-division counteroffensive led by a large tank force. All the gains of that year were lost back to the North Vietnamese.

In March 1970 the Cambodian government of Lon Nol ended the policy of ignoring the Vietnamese presence in the country. The port of Sihanoukville in Cambodia, which had effectively been a North Vietnamese Army supply terminal for years, was closed by the government. Cambodia soon collapsed into war. This had the effect of making the supply routes from North Vietnam through Laos even more important to the North Vietnamese. In the spring of 1970 the North Vietnamese Army began advancing westward deeper into Laos than ever before. During the same year, units of the Thai Army entered the conflict. These so-called Unity Battalions were in theory volunteers, but were effectively Thai regulars.

In 1971 the Royal Lao Army came back into the conflict. The North Vietnamese advance deep into the country destroyed the status quo and prompted the Army back into action. In July the Thai and irregular forces attempted a repeat of the successful 1969 offensive into the Plain of Jars. But the North Vietnamese had learned from their previous mistakes and withdrew in good order ahead of the offensive. While much territory was captured, no serious damage was done to the North Vietnamese Army.

The Thai and irregular forces built a chain of fortifications down the middle of the Plain of Jars. In 1971 the US sponsored an incursion into southern Laos by the South Vietnamese army, with the aim of severing the trail and shoring up the South Vietnamese government as the US withdrew its combat troops. The invasion was bitterly resisted by North Vietnamese and was decisively defeated. The North Vietnamese also retaliated by capturing several provincial capitals which it had previously surrounded but not tried to take.

About 50,000 people were killed in Laos in the course of the war, many of them Lao civilians. While the ethnic minorities who mainly populated the mountains of the Pathēt Lao areas suffered terribly as a result of the war, the majority of the Lao-Lum people in the Mekong Valley towns were little effected in a military sense. The influx of US personnel and money (an estimated $US500 million in US aid alone) produced an economic boom in the towns as service industries grew to meet the demands of the war and the large resident American civilian population.

Lao generals and politicians, led by Phūmī Nôsavan until his fall from power in 1965, grew rich on corruption, drug dealing, prostitution and smuggling, and large numbers of ordinary Lao moved into the cash economy for the first time, particularly in Viang Chan, which grew rapidly. The war also exposed the Lao to the full force of western popular culture for the first time, with an effect that both the Pathēt Lao and conservative Buddhists regarded as deeply corrupting of Lao tradition and culture.

During these years the Pathēt Lao sought to project an image of moderation both domestically and internationally. Suphānuvong, as head of the Lao Patriotic Front, was the public face of the Pathēt Lao, while the Communist Party and its leader Kaisôn remained in the background. At its 1968 congress, the Front issued a 12-point program which made no mention of socialism, but called for a Government of National Union and free elections, and promised respect for Buddhism and the monarchy. The fact that Suphānuvong was a royal prince as well as a communist seemed to many Lao a reassurance that the Pathēt Lao in power would pursue a moderate path.

In the Pathēt Lao zone, the communists followed conspicuously moderate policies, although there were some attempts at collectivising agriculture where this was possible. The Pathēt Lao were effective providers of basic services, despite the difficulties created by the endless bombing, and also effective at mobilising the upland minorities. Most notably, the Pathēt Lao were largely free from corruption. On the negative side, as most Lao knew, their policies were largely controlled by the North Vietnamese.

=== Peace agreement (1973) ===
In January 1973, following Nixon's re-election, a peace agreement was announced between North Vietnam and the US. Following the pattern which had been established in Geneva in 1954, a peace settlement in Laos was agreed on as a side issue to the Vietnam question. The two sides in Laos had been in informal discussions since the previous July, and once their respective patrons had consented, they quickly signed a ceasefire and announced an Agreement on the Restoration of Peace and National Reconciliation. The main provisions were the formation of a Third Coalition government, with Suvannaphūmā as prime minister and 12 ministers from each side. The National Assembly, which had long lost its political legitimacy, was to be replaced by a Consultative Council of 42 members - 16 from each side plus ten agreed nominees. This body, to be chaired by Suphānuvong, was given equal status with the government, making Suphānuvong in effect co-ruler of the country.

There was no mention of the Pathēt Lao giving up de facto control of its zone. Its armed forces were to be integrated into the national army in theory, but the timetable was never really certain. While the agreement required the North Vietnamese Army to leave Laos, the Vietnamese never left. The arrangements reflected the vastly strengthened position of the Pathēt Lao since the Second Coalition government. In recognition of this, the rightists attempted a last-gasp coup in Viang Chan in August, but it quickly collapsed, since by then many Lao recognised that it was only a matter of time before the Pathēt Lao took power.

During 1974 and 1975 the balance of power in Laos shifted steadily in favour of the Pathēt Lao as the US disengaged itself from Indochina. Suvannaphūmā was tired and demoralised, and following a heart attack in mid-1974 he spent some months recuperating in France, after which he announced that he would retire from politics following the elections scheduled for early 1976. The anti-communist forces were thus leaderless, and also divided and deeply mired in corruption.

Suphānuvong, by contrast, was confident and a master political tactician, and had behind him the disciplined cadres of the communist party and the Pathēt Lao forces and the North Vietnamese army. The end of American aid also meant the mass demobilisation of most of the non-Pathēt Lao military forces in the country. The Pathēt Lao on the other hand continued to be both funded and equipped by North Vietnam.

In May 1974 Suphānuvong put forward an 18-point plan for "National Reconstruction," which was unanimously adopted - a sign of his increasing dominance. The plan was mostly uncontroversial, with renewed promises of free elections, democratic rights and respect for religion, as well as constructive economic policies. But press censorship was introduced in the name of "national unity," making it more difficult for non-communist forces to organise politically in response to the creeping Pathēt Lao takeover. In January 1975 all public meetings and demonstrations were banned. Recognising the trend of events, influential business and political figures began to move their assets, and in some cases themselves, to Thailand, France or the US

In 1975, the Pathēt Lao forces on the Plain of Jars supported by North Vietnamese heavy artillery and other units began advancing westward. In late April, the Pathēt Lao took the government outpost at Sala Phou Khoum crossroads which opened up Route 13 to a Pathēt Lao advance toward Muang Kassy. For the non-Pathēt Lao elements in the government, compromise seemed better than allowing what had happened in Cambodia and South Vietnam to happen in Laos. A surrender was thought to be better than a change of power by force.

== Communist Laos (1975–1991) ==
In March 1975, confident that the US no longer had the wherewithal to intervene militarily in Indochina, the North Vietnamese began their final military offensive in South Vietnam, which by the end of April carried them to victory with the fall of Saigon. A few days earlier the Khmer Rouge army had entered Phnom Penh. The Pathēt Lao now knew that victory was within reach, and with the Vietnam war over the North Vietnamese authorized the seizure of power in Laos.

Demonstrations broke out in Viang Chan, denouncing the rightists and demanding political change. Rightist ministers resigned from the government and fled the country, followed by senior Royal Lao Army commanders. A Pathēt Lao minister took over the defence portfolio, removing any chance of the Army resisting the Pathēt Lao takeover. Suvannaphūmā, dreading further conflict and apparently trusting Suphānuvong's promises of a moderate policy, gave instructions that the Pathēt Lao were not to be resisted, and the US began to withdraw its diplomatic personnel.

The Pathēt Lao army entered the major towns of southern Laos during May, and in early June occupied Luang Phrabāng. Panic broke out in Viang Chan as most of the business class and many officials, officers and others who had collaborated with the US scrambled to get their families and property across the Mekong to Thailand. Recognising that the cause was lost, Vang Pao led thousands of his Hmong fighters and their families into exile - eventually about a third of all the Lao Hmong left the country. Pathēt Lao forces entered an almost deserted Viang Chan in August.

For a few months the Pathēt Lao appeared to honour their promises of moderation. The shell of the coalition government was preserved, there were no arrests or show-trials, and private property was respected. Diplomatic relations with the US were maintained, despite an immediate cut-off of all US aid. Other western countries continued to offer aid, and Soviet and eastern European technicians began to arrive to replace the departed Americans.

=== Start of totalitarianism ===
In December 1975, there was a sharp change in policy. A joint meeting of the government and the Consultative Council was held, at which Suphānuvong demanded immediate change. There was no resistance. On 2 December the King agreed to abdicate, and Suvannaphūmā resigned. The Lao People's Democratic Republic was proclaimed with Suphānuvong as president. Kaisôn Phomvihān emerged from the shadows to become Prime Minister and the real ruler of the country. Kaisôn immediately began the process of establishing the new republic as a one-party communist state.

No more was heard of elections or political freedoms: non-communist newspapers were closed, and a large-scale purge of the civil service, army and police was launched. Thousands were dispatched for "re-education" in remote parts of the country, where many died and many more were kept for up to ten years. This prompted a renewed flight from the country. Many of the professional and intellectual class, who had initially been willing to work for the new regime, changed their minds and left - a much easier thing to do from Laos than from either Vietnam or Cambodia. By 1977, 10 percent of the population had left the country, including most of the business and educated classes.

The leadership group of the Lao People's Revolutionary Party had hardly changed since the party's foundation, and did not change significantly during its first decade in power. Real power in the party rested with four men: General Secretary Kaisôn, his trusted deputy and economics chief Nuhak Phumsavan (both from humble origins in Savannakhet), planning minister Sālī Vongkhamxao (who died in 1991) and the Army commander and security chief Khamtai Siphandôn. The party's French-educated intellectuals - President Souphanavong and education and propaganda minister Phumi Vongvichit - were more widely seen in public and were Politburo members, but not part of the inner group.

All these leaders were Lao-Lum: while the ethnic minorities had provided most of the troops for the Pathēt Lao army, their leaders were confined to symbolic roles in front organisations rather than admitted to the inner core of party leadership. In 1975 the party had only 30,000 members in a country of 3.5 million people. Of these, a substantial number were members of ethnic minorities from the former Pathēt Lao zone, who had joined the party for pragmatic or patriotic reasons rather than through a real understanding of communism. The number of committed communists among the Lao-Lum majority of the Lao population was very small.

The public policy of the party was to "advance, step by step, to socialism, without going through the stage of capitalist development." This objective made a virtue of necessity: there was no chance of Laos having a "stage of capitalist development" while 90 percent of its population were subsistence farmers, and no chance of an orthodox Marxist path to socialism via a working class revolution in a country which had no industrial working class.

The party leaders, having fought for 30 years to achieve power, now had to confront the question of what "socialism" meant in a country such as Laos, and how it was to be achieved in circumstances of poverty and isolation, when most administrative and professional personnel had fled the country. Out of public sight, the policy of the party was generally determined by Vietnam. The policies of Vietnam led to the economic isolation of Laos from all its neighbours which in turn led to its total dependence on Vietnam.

=== Agricultural collectivisation ===
For Kaisôn the path to socialism lay in emulating first the Vietnamese and then the Soviet models. "Socialist relations of production" must be introduced, and this, in an agricultural country, meant primarily the collectivisation of agriculture. All land was declared to be state property, and individual farms were merged into large-scale "co-operatives." The means of production - which in Laos meant buffalo and wooden ploughs - were to be owned collectively. By the end of 1978 most of the lowland Lao rice-growers had been subjected to collectivisation.

The program was deeply unpopular. The Pathēt Lao had never had much active support in these areas, and the peasants felt no sense of gratitude to the communists for having freed them from oppressive landlords, since there had been few in Laos. The peasants engaged in passive resistance, including the slaughter of livestock, and many emigrated to Thailand. The impossibility of controlling the long Lao-Thai border meant that farmers could easily sell their crops on the free market in Thailand.

As a result, state food procurements fell sharply, and this, coupled with the cutoff of American aid, postwar cutback of Vietnamese/Soviet aid and the virtual disappearance of imported goods, produced shortages, unemployment and economic hardship in the towns. Matters were made worse in 1979 when the Vietnamese invasion of Cambodia, and subsequent Sino-Vietnamese War, resulted in the Lao government being ordered by Vietnam to break off relations with China, ending another source of foreign assistance and trade.

=== Economic deterioration ===
The deteriorating economic situation soon led to active resistance to the communist regime. Incidents of sabotage escalated, particularly in the south, and a shadowy Lao National Revolutionary Front began guerilla operations from bases in Thailand, just as the communists themselves had done in the 1940s. In 1976 the army seized power again in Thailand, and the anti-communist military regime closed off all exports to Laos, making economic conditions even worse, and actively supported the Lao opposition: shortly afterwards a plot to assassinate Kaisôn, engineered by exiles with Thai support, was exposed.

As well as economic grievances, the resistance was fuelled by resentment in urban areas over the government's restrictions on freedom of movement, tight censorship and curtailment of "decadent" western cultural activities such as cinema and nightclubs. The exodus of educated people to Thailand led to a partial collapse of the education system, leaving large numbers of idle young people as a ready source of discontent.

The Vietnamese, Soviet and eastern European technicians and advisors had little interest in developing the country other than as a source of resources to be extracted, and infrastructure and plants soon deteriorated. Lack of money and skilled personnel, plus an anti-Chinese political line directed by Vietnam, plus the Thai trade embargo, caused interruptions to vital services such as electricity.

Ruptured relations with China and Thailand made Laos totally dependent on Vietnam. In 1977 a 25-year treaty of friendship was signed, providing for large numbers of Vietnamese advisors and for 30,000 Vietnamese troops to stay in the country. The Vietnamese were as unpopular as ever with the majority of the Lao people, despite a barrage of propaganda designed to encourage "solidarity" between the two countries. The belief that the communists were allowing the Vietnamese to take over Laos fuelled opposition.

During 1978 and 1979 the government became increasingly alarmed about the security situation. Both China and Thailand were supporting insurgencies in different parts of the country, and the resistance of the Hmong in central Laos revived with covert assistance from the exiled Hmong leaders in Thailand. The Laotian government reaction was to arrest the elderly King, his Queen and the Crown Prince, and deport them to a remote location near the Vietnamese border, where they died of neglect and lack of medical attention. For many years the fate of the Lao royal family remained unknown, but in the 1990s the truth leaked out and caused wide resentment in Laos.

=== Pull-back from Marxist orthodoxy ===
In mid-1979 the government, apparently at the urging of Soviet advisors who feared that the communist regime was on the point of collapse, announced a sudden reversal of policy. Kaisôn, a lifelong communist, showed himself to be a more flexible leader than many had expected. In a major speech in December, he admitted that Laos was not ready for socialism. "This policy cannot be successfully implemented in the economic field, and it is suicidal because any party which tries to implement such a policy will only meet with bankruptcy." Citing Lenin's "New Economic Policy" of the 1920s, he conceded that capitalist relations of production would have to be restored if the economic decline of the country was not to continue and be exploited by "enemies" of the regime.

Kaisôn's model was not Lenin, however, but China's Deng Xiaoping, who at this time was starting the free-market reforms that laid the foundation for China's subsequent economic growth. Collectivisation was abandoned, and farmers were told that they were free to leave the "co-operative" farms, which virtually all of them promptly did, and to sell their surplus grain on the free market. Other liberalisations followed. Restrictions on internal movement were lifted, and cultural policy relaxed. As in China, however, there was no relaxation of the party's grip on political power.

=== Insurgency in Laos ===
The conflict between Hmong militias and the Pathet Lao continued in isolated pockets following the end of the Civil War. The government of Laos has been accused of committing genocide against the Hmong in collaboration with the Vietnamese army, with up to 100,000 killed out of a population of 400,000. From 1975 to 1996, the United States resettled some 250,000 Lao refugees from Thailand, including 130,000 Hmong.

In 1990, deputy minister of science and technology Thongsouk Saysangkhi resigned from the Government and Party, calling for political and economic reform. He was arrested and died in captivity in 1998.

=== Relations with Vietnam ===
Relations with Vietnam had secretly set the strategy for the LPRP during the struggle to achieve full power, and the "sudden" opportunity to establish the LPDR in 1975 left no leeway to consider foreign policy alignments other than a continuation of the "special relations" with Vietnam. The relationship cultivated in the revolutionary stage predisposed Laos to Indochinese solidarity in the reconstruction and "socialist construction" phases and all but ensured that relations or alignments with China and Thailand would be wary and potentially unfriendly. Further, the LPRP, unlike the Cambodian communists under Pol Pot, was far too accustomed to accepting Vietnamese advice to consider striking out on its own.

The final seizure of power by the hitherto secret LPRP in 1975 brought both a public acknowledgment of the previously hidden North Vietnamese guidance of the party and genuine expressions of gratitude by the LPRP to its Vietnamese partners. The challenge facing the ruling group—the construction of a socialist society—was seen as a natural extension of past collaboration with North Vietnam. The revolution was simply entering a new phase in 1975, and the LPRP leaders congratulated themselves upon ousting the imperialists and looked forward to advice and economic as well as military support, which was not available from any neighbour or counterrevolutionary state.

LPRP leaders were accustomed to discussing policies as well as studying doctrine in Hanoi. They formalised governmental contacts with their mentors at biannual meetings of the foreign ministers of Cambodia, Laos, and Vietnam starting in 1980 and through the joint Vietnam-Laos Cooperative Commission, which met annually to review progress of various projects. Other levels of co-operation between Laos and Vietnam existed, for example, party-to-party meetings and province-to-province exchanges, as well as mass organisations for youths and women. Meetings of the commission were held regularly.

The primary channels for Vietnam's influence in Laos, however, were the LPRP and the LPA. In the LPRP, long-standing collaboration and consultation at the very top made special committees unnecessary, whereas in the LPA, the Vietnamese advisers, instructors, and troops on station constituted a pervasive, inescapable influence, even though they scrupulously avoided public exposure by sticking to their designated base areas. Cooperation in the military field was probably the most extensive, with logistics, training, and communications largely supplied by Vietnam throughout the 1970s and 1980s (heavy ordnance and aircraft were provided by the Soviet Union).

The phrase "special relations" came into general use by both parties after 1976, and in July 1977, the signing of the 25-year Lao-Vietnamese Treaty of Friendship and Cooperation legitimised the stationing of Vietnamese army troops in Laos for its protection against hostile or counterrevolutionary neighbours. Another element of co-operation involved hundreds of Vietnamese advisers who mentored their Laotian counterparts in virtually all the ministries in Vientiane. Hundreds of LPRP stalwarts and technicians studied in institutes of Marxism–Leninism or technical schools in Hanoi.

The resources that Vietnam was able to bestow upon its revolutionary partner, however, were severely limited by the physical destruction of war and the deadening orthodoxy of its economic structures and policies. However, it could put in a good word for its Laotian apprentices with the Soviet Union, which in turn could recommend economic assistance projects to its East European satellite states. Yet, Vietnam's influence on Laos was determined by economic assistance and ideology as well as by geographical and historical proximity. The two nations fit together, as the leaders liked to say, "like lips and teeth". Vietnam provided landlocked Laos a route to the sea, and the mountainous region of eastern Laos provided Vietnam a forward strategic position for challenging Thai hegemony in the Mekong Valley.

Despite the political and military alliance between Vietnam and the Soviet Union, the Vietnamese Communist leadership saw to it that Soviet influence be remain limited in the LPDR. In the mid-1980s, the Vietnamese leaders, unnerved by the efforts of Mikhail Gorbachev to reach reconciliation with China, decided to reinforce their grip over Laos, even at the expense of their Soviet allies. In May–June 1985, Truong Chinh, Vietnam's head of state, paid his first official visits to Laos and the People's Republic of Kampuchea, during which decisions were made to reduce Laotian imports from Thailand, and further redirect Laotian foreign trade toward the Vietnamese ports of Da Nang and Ho Chi Minh City. In late 1985, the Laotian government, probably due to Vietnamese pressure, asked the USSR to withdraw all Soviet civilian advisers from the LPDR, whereas the number of Vietnamese advisers underwent a simultaneous increase.

During the 1980s, Vietnam's regional opponents attributed to it a neocolonial ambition to create an "Indochina Federation". This phrase can be found in early pronouncements of the ICP in its struggle against the French colonial structures in Indochina. The charge, exaggerated as it was, lost its currency once Vietnam withdrew its troops from Cambodia in 1989 and subsequently from Laos. Laos's dependence on Vietnam since 1975 could then be perceived as a natural extension of their collaboration and solidarity in revolution rather than as domination by Vietnam.

With the departure of Vietnamese military forces—except for some construction engineers—and the passing of most senior Vietnamese revolutionary partners, the magnetism of the special relationship lost its grip. Further, Vietnam was never able to muster large-scale economic aid programs. It launched only 200 assistance projects between 1975 and 1985, whereas the Soviet Union generated considerably more in the way of contributions. In 1992 the long-standing Vietnamese ambassador to Laos, a veteran of fourteen years' service, characterised the relationship as composed "d'amitié et de coopération multiforme entre les pays" (of friendship and diverse co-operation between the two countries). This pronouncement was far less compelling than the "objective law of existence and development" formulation sometimes expressed in the past.

Although Vietnam's historical record of leadership in the revolution and its military power and proximity will not cease to exist, Laos struck out ahead of Vietnam with its New Economic Mechanism to introduce market mechanisms into its economy. In so doing, Laos has opened the door to rapprochement with Thailand and Russia at some expense to its special dependence on Vietnam. Laos might have reached the same point of normalisation in following Vietnam's economic and diplomatic change, but by moving ahead resolutely and responding to Thai and Russian gestures, Laos has broadened its range of donors, trading partners, and investors independent of Vietnam's attempts to accomplish the same goal. Thus, Vietnam remains in the shadows as a mentor and emergency ally, and the tutelage of Laos has shifted dramatically to development banks and international entrepreneurs.

== Contemporary Laos (1991–present) ==
The abandonment of agricultural collectivization and the end of totalitarianism brought with them new problems, which grew worse the longer the communist party enjoyed a monopoly of power. These included increasing corruption and nepotism (a traditional feature of Lao political life), as ideological commitment faded and self-interest arose to replace it as the major motivation for seeking and holding office. The economic benefits of economic liberalisation were also slow to emerge.

Unlike China, Laos did not have the potential for rapid economic growth through free market mechanisms in agriculture and the fostering of export-driven low-wage manufacturing. This was partly because Laos was a small, poor, landlocked country while China had the advantage of decades more communist development. As a result, the Lao farmers, most living at little more than subsistence level, could not generate the surpluses, even given economic incentives, that the Chinese peasants could and did after Deng's decollectivisation of agriculture.

Cut off from educational opportunities in the west, many young Lao were dispatched for higher education in Vietnam, the Soviet Union or eastern Europe, but even crash education courses took time to produce trained teachers, engineers and doctors. In any case, the standard of training in some cases was not high, and many of the Lao students lacked the language skills to understand what they were being taught. Today many of these Lao regard themselves as a "lost generation" and have had to gain new qualifications at western standards to be able to find employment.

In 1985, recognising the disappointing results of the party's first decade in power, Kaisôn introduced the New Economic Mechanism. Although justified with appropriate socialist phraseology, this policy amounted in effect to abandoning state ownership and control of the economy. The state bureaucracy was reduced in size and its role in economic management reduced, subsidies to state industries were abolished, managers were told that they should aim to make their enterprises profitable (which inevitably meant shedding employees), and retail prices were deregulated.

While long-term benefits were expected from these reforms, in the short term they produced inflation, unemployment among workers from the loss-making state sector, and resentment and insecurity among the urban population. The reforms thus did little to bolster the standing of the communist regime, particularly since its concessions to capitalism had cost it much of its ideological legitimacy. Fortunately for the party, the opposition forces were too weak and disorganised to take advantage of the party's vulnerable position.

The international position of Laos also remained precarious. Deference to Vietnam had resulted in the political and economic isolation of Laos. Its other borders with China and Thailand were hostile and closed. The policies of the government had left it dependent on Vietnam as its only ally and source of assistance. By the mid-1980s relations with China had begun to thaw as Chinese anger at Lao support for Vietnam in 1979 faded and Vietnamese power within Laos diminished.

By 1986 official ties had been restored, although relations remained cool. Ambassadors were exchanged in 1988, the same year Vietnam officially withdrew its troops from both Laos and Cambodia (in fact some troops remained in Laos). At the same time, Laos made the first steps to repairing relations with the US, co-operating with US efforts to find the remains of American air-crew shot down over Laos during the Indochina war.

This restoration of ties was seen as necessary both to enable American aid and investment to resume, and to end covert US support for the low-level anti-communist insurgency which continued to flicker in the south. The government also hoped that the US would use its influence to urge Thailand to ease its economic and political pressure on Laos. In 1984 and again in 1987 there were border clashes between Thai and Lao forces in a disputed territory in Xainyaburī province, and Thai restrictions on trade continued to hurt Laos.

With the collapse of communism in eastern Europe, which began in 1989 and ended with the fall of the Soviet Union in 1991, came a profound shock to the Lao communist leaders. Ideologically, it did not suggest to the Lao leaders that there was anything fundamentally wrong with socialism as an idea, but it confirmed for them the wisdom of the concessions in economic policy they had made since 1979. More practically, the Soviet Union had been the largest contributor of foreign aid to Laos, but in 1989 Mikhail Gorbachev told Kaisôn that aid would have to be sharply reduced.

Aid was cut off completely in 1990, creating a renewed economic crisis. Laos was forced to ask France and Japan for emergency assistance, and also to ask the World Bank and the Asian Development Bank for aid. This had further consequences. The international agencies required further economic liberalisation and reform as a precondition for large-scale aid. Laos was also forced to mend its fences with the non-communist countries if it wanted their assistance. Laos was helped in this by the restoration of civilian government in Thailand after 1992, which ended the confrontationist policies of the previous military regimes. Finally, in 1989, Kaisôn visited Beijing to confirm the restoration of friendly relations, and to secure Chinese aid.

In the 1990s the old guard of Lao communism passed from the scene. Suphānuvong retired in 1991 and died in 1995. He was succeeded as president by Kaisôn, while Khamtai Siphandôn became prime minister, but Kaisôn in turn died in November 1992, and was succeeded as president by Nuhak Phumsavan and as party leader by Khamtai, who thus emerged as the effective ruler of the country. In 1998 Nuhak retired and Khamtai succeeded him as president, a post he continued to hold until 2006, at 81 the last of the generation of leaders who waged the "thirty-year struggle" for power. General Sisavath Keobounphanh became prime minister in 1998, and was succeeded in 2001 by Boungnang Vorachith.

Since the 1990s the dominant factor in the Lao economy has been the spectacular growth in the South-East Asian region, and particularly in Thailand. In 1994 an Australian-funded bridge was opened linking Viang Chan with the Thai city of Nong Khai: this has become the country's most important piece of infrastructure, because it has linked Laos to the booming Thai economy. (Since then another bridge has been built crossing the Mekong river at Pākxē linking the Lao areas west of the Mekong and the Lao-Thai border and Ubon Ratchathani further west in Thailand. A third bridge, called the Second Thai-Lao Friendship Bridge has been built connecting Savannakhet to Mukdahan in Thailand, opened on 9 January 2007. Also see Third Thai-Lao Friendship Bridge and Fourth Thai-Lao Friendship Bridge.)

To take advantage of this, the Lao government lifted virtually all restrictions on foreign trade and investment, allowing Thai and other foreign firms to set up and trade freely in the country. Lao and Chinese exiles were also encouraged to return to Laos, and to bring their money with them. Many did so - today a member of the former Lao royal family, Princess Manilai, owns a hotel and health resort in Luang Phrabāng, while some of the old Lao elite families, such as the Inthavongs, again operate (if not live) in the country.

Of equal benefit to Laos was the rapid expansion of tourism in South-East Asia, in which again Thailand was a leading participant. The Lao government saw the possibilities of income from tourism in the 1990s, but the almost total lack of tourist infrastructure, the poor transport system, the non-convertibility of the Lao currency and fears by some communist officials of political dangers and "cultural pollution" from an influx of foreigners all acted as barriers. The American writer Brett Dakin, who worked as an adviser to the Lao National Tourism Authority, has written an amusing account of the struggles of the Lao bureaucracy to adapt to the demands of the tourism industry.

Among his projects was "Visit Laos Year" in 1999–2000, which began the current boom in tourism to Laos. Today Laos is a popular tourist destination, with the cultural and religious glories of Luang Phrabāng (now a UNESCO World Heritage Site) being particularly popular. A host of small businesses have grown up to serve the tourist trade, providing welcome employment to thousands of people, while foreign (mainly Thai) airlines, bus companies and hotels have moved in to fill the infrastructure gaps that the Lao government lacks the funds or expertise to provide.

Since the reforms of the 1980s, Laos has achieved sustained growth, averaging six percent a year since 1988, except during the 1997 Asian financial crisis. But subsistence agriculture still accounts for half of GDP and provides 80 percent of total employment. Much of the private sector is controlled by Thai and Chinese companies, and indeed Laos has to some extent become an economic and cultural colony of Thailand, a source of some resentment among Lao. Laos is still heavily dependent on foreign aid, but Thailand's ongoing expansion has increased demand for timber and hydroelectricity, Laos's only major export commodities. Recently Laos has normalised its trade relations with the US, but this has yet to produce any major benefits. The European Union has provided funds to enable Laos to meet membership requirements for the World Trade Organization. A major hurdle is the Lao kip, which is still not an officially convertible currency.

The communist party retains a monopoly of political power, but leaves the operation of the economy to market forces, and does not interfere in the daily lives of the Lao people provided they do not challenge its rule. Attempts to police the religious, cultural, economic and sexual activities of the people have been largely abandoned, although Christian evangelism is officially discouraged. The media is state controlled, but most Lao have free access to Thai radio and television (Thai and Lao are mutually comprehensible languages), which gives them news from the outside world.

Modestly censored Internet access is available in most towns. Lao are also fairly free to travel to Thailand, and indeed illegal Lao immigration to Thailand is a problem for the Thai government. Those who challenge the communist regime, however, receive harsh treatment. Amnesty International has continued to document illegal detention and torture of political detainees. Various opposition groups operate in Thailand and the US, but there seems little evidence of active opposition inside Laos. For the time being most Lao seem content with the personal freedom and modest prosperity they have enjoyed over the past decade.

In March 2006 Khamtai stepped down as Party leader and President, and was succeeded in both posts by Choummaly Sayasone, aged a relatively youthful 70. Like Khamtai, Choummaly had a military background, and was generally seen as unlikely to initiate major reforms. In january 2016, Bounnhang Vorachit succeeded Choummaly Sayasone as president and leader of the ruling Lao People's Revolutionary Party (LPRP).

Due to the COVID-19 pandemic in Laos, land borders were largely closed and flights halted for almost two years between May 30, 2020 and May 9, 2022, with 14-day quarantine required for incoming travellers. Within Laos, various lockdowns led to unemployment spiking as high as 30% in late 2021 with an estimated 42% of children not attending school temporarily or permanently.

In January 2021, Prime Minister Thongloun Sisoulith became new secretary general of the ruling Lao People’s Revolutionary Party replacing retiring Bounnhang Vorachit. Leader of the ruling party is the most powerful post in the country. In March 2021, Thongloun Sisoulith was also elected as the new President of Laos.

== See also ==
- CIA activities in Laos
- North Vietnamese invasion of Laos
- Laotian Rebellion (1826-1828)

== Sources ==
- Schanche, Don A. (1970), Mister Pop, New York: David McKay, OCLC 68288
- McCoy, Alfred (1972), The Politics of Heroin in Southeast Asia, Harper & Row, ISBN 0060129018, archived from the original on 16 February 2015 (The link is to the complete text of the book.)
- Thompson, Larry Clinton (2010), Refugee workers in the Indochina exodus, 1975-1982, Jefferson, N.C. : McFarland & Co., ISBN 9780786445295
- Warner, Roger (1996), Shooting at the moon : the story of America' clandestine war in Laos, South Royalton, Vt. : Steerforth Press, ISBN 1883642361
- Martin Stuart-Fox, A History of Laos, Cambridge University Press 1997
- Kenneth Conboy, War in Laos 1954-1975, Squadron/Signal publications 1994
- Jean Deuve, "Le royaume du Laos, 1949-1965", Paris, L'Harmattan, 2003, 387 p.
