= Royal Palace, Luang Prabang =

Palace in Laos

Coordinates: 19.8921°N 102.1356°E

Royal Palace
- Haw kham
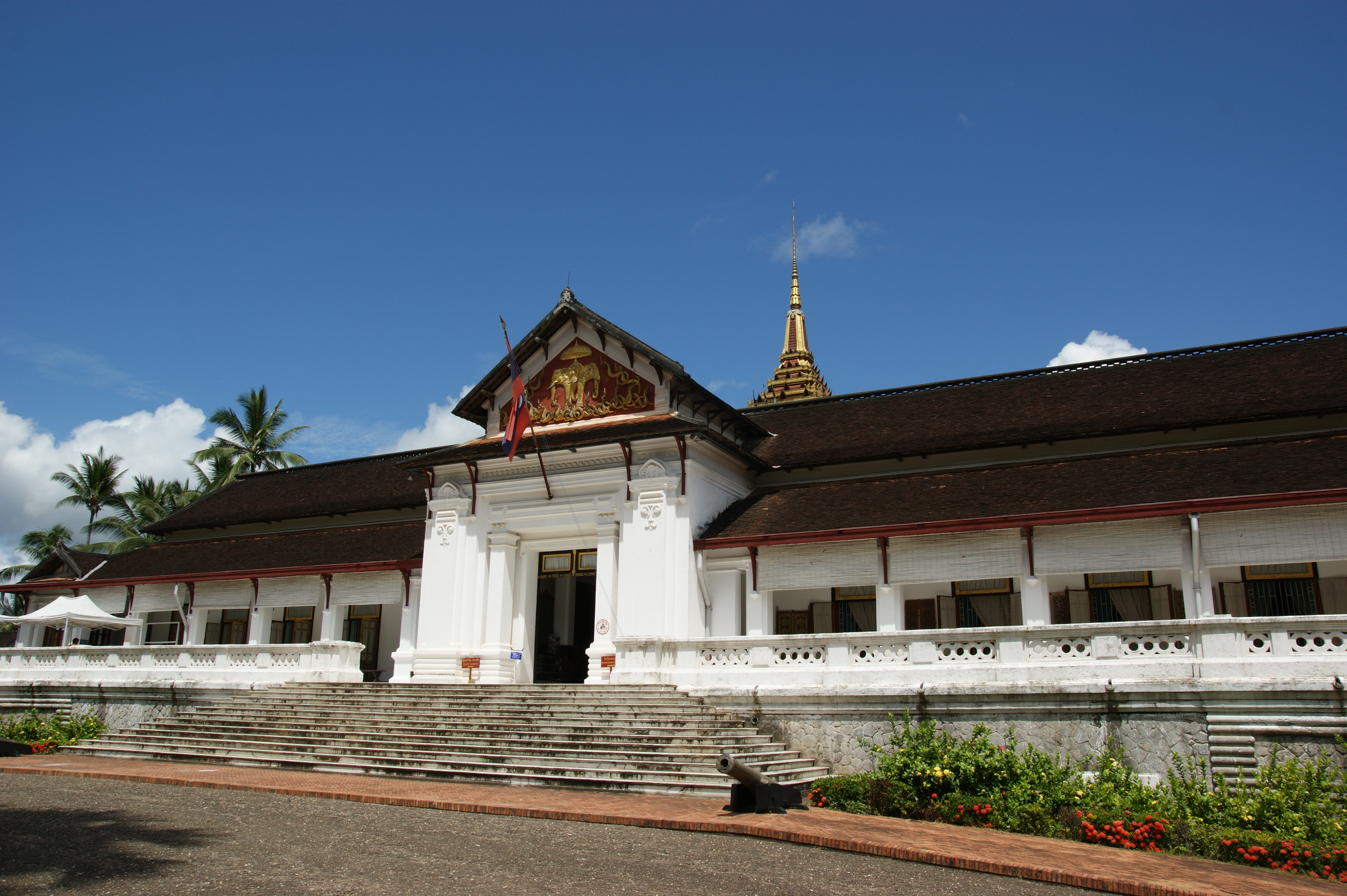
- The Royal Palace in Luang Prabang
- Interactive map of the Royal Palace area
- Former names: Haw Kham

General information
- Type: Former royal residence
- Architectural style: Lao and French Beaux-Arts style
- Location: Luang Prabang, Laos
- Construction started: 1904
- Completed: 1909
- Owner: Lao government

Technical details
- Floor count: 1

The Royal Palace (officially Haw Kham, Lao: ຫໍຄຳ Lao pronunciation: [hɔ̌ɔ.kʰám]) in Luang Prabang, Laos, was built in 1904 during the French colonial era for King Sisavang Vong and his family. The site for the palace was chosen so that official visitors to Luang Prabang could disembark from their river voyages directly below the palace and be received there. After Sisavang's death, the crown prince Savang Vatthana and his family were the last to occupy the grounds. In 1975, the monarchy was overthrown by the communists, and the royal family were taken to re-education camps. The palace was then converted into a national museum.

== Grounds ==
On the palace grounds, there are buildings surrounding the palace, including:

- kitchen / storage
- royal barge shelter
- conference hall
- Haw Phra Bang
- staff headquarters

There is a lotus pond and two cannons at the entrance of the palace. A statue of Sisavang Vong stands outside the conference hall.

== Architecture and furnishings ==
The architecture of the palace has a mix of traditional Lao motifs and French Beaux-Arts styles. It is laid out in a double-cruciform shape, with the entrance on one side of the lower crossbar. Above the entrance is a three-headed elephant sheltered by the sacred white parasol, the symbol of the Lao monarchy. The steps to the entrance are made of Italian marble. There are royal religious objects on display in the large entrance hall.

On the right of the entrance is the king's reception room, where busts of the Luang Phrabang and later, Lao monarchs are displayed along with two large gilded and lacquered Ramayana screens, crafted by local artisan Thit Tanh. The walls are covered with murals that depict scenes from traditional Lao lifestyles, painted in 1930 by French artist Alix de Fauntereau. Each of the walls is intended to be viewed at a different time of day, depending on the light that enters the windows on one side of the room, which matches the time of day depicted.

In the right front corner room of the palace, which opens to the outside, is a collection of the palace's most prized art, including the Phra Bang, cast of a gold, silver, and bronze alloy. This Buddha stands 83 cm tall and weighs around 50 kg. Legend has it that the statue was made around the 1st century in Sri Lanka and was later gifted by the Khmer king to his son-in-law King Fa Ngum, in 1359.

The Siamese twice took the image to Thailand, in 1779 and 1827, but it was returned to Laos by King Mongkut in 1867. The room includes another Buddha, engraved with large elephant tusks, and three beautiful saew mâi khán (embroidered silk screens with religious imagery) that were crafted by the queen.

On the left of the entrance hall, the secretary's reception room is filled with paintings, silver, and china that have been presented to Laos as diplomatic gifts from Myanmar, Cambodia, Thailand, Poland, Hungary, Russia, Japan, Vietnam, China, Nepal, the United States, Canada, and Australia. These objects are grouped by "socialist" and "capitalist" countries. One exhibit donated by the US is a piece of Moon rock obtained by an Apollo mission.

The next room to the left was once the queen's reception room. Large royal portraits of King Savang Vatthana, Queen Khamphoui, and Crown Prince Vong Savang, painted by Russian artist Ilya Glazunov in 1967, are hung on the walls. There are friendship flags from China and Vietnam and replicas of sculpture from the Indian National Museum.

In the far rooms are the royal family's bedrooms and living quarters. The bedrooms have been preserved as they were in 1975, when the king was forced from the palace. There is a dining hall and a room that contains royal seals and medals.

The throne room contains the crown jewels of Laos.

== Gallery ==
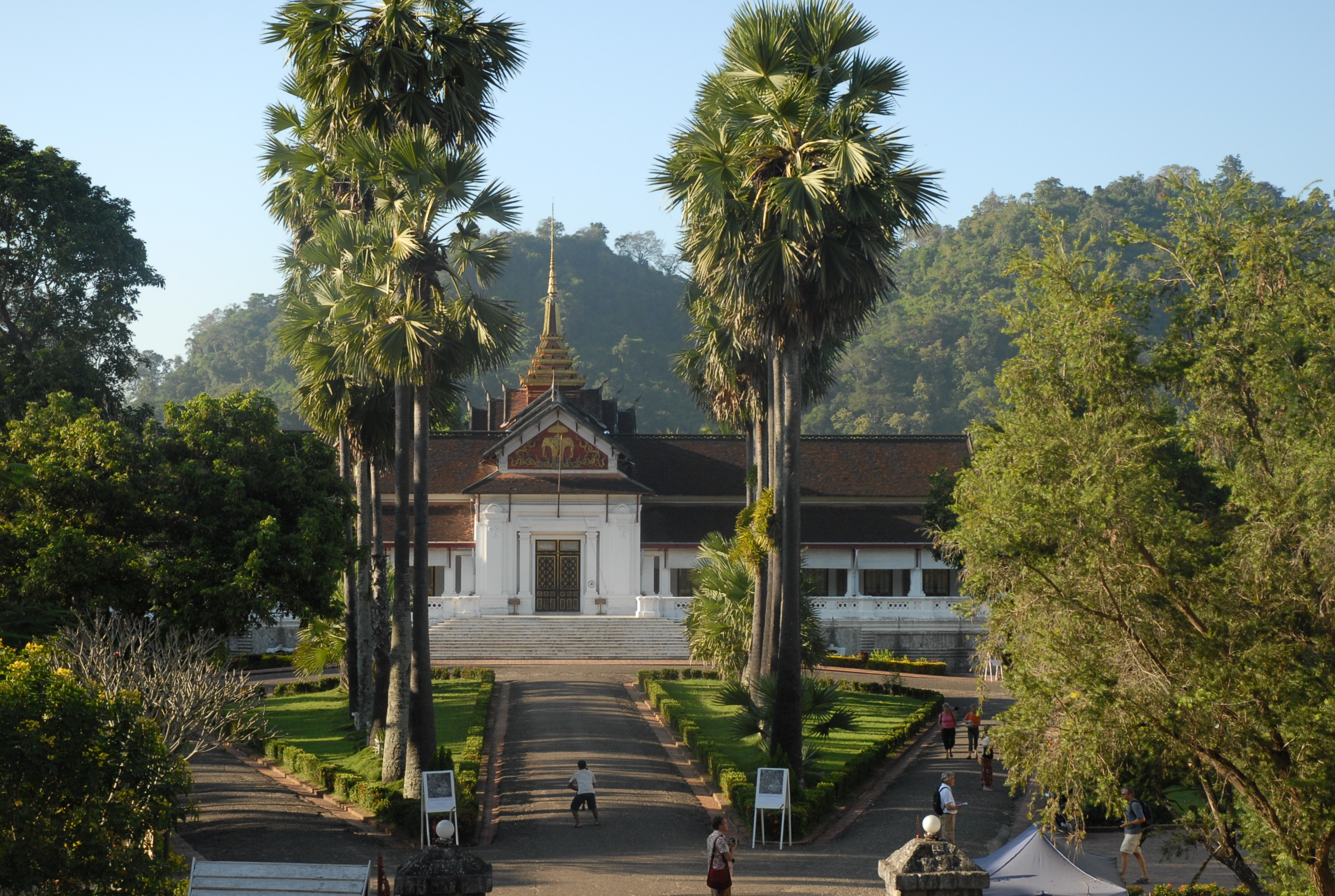
Front view of the palace

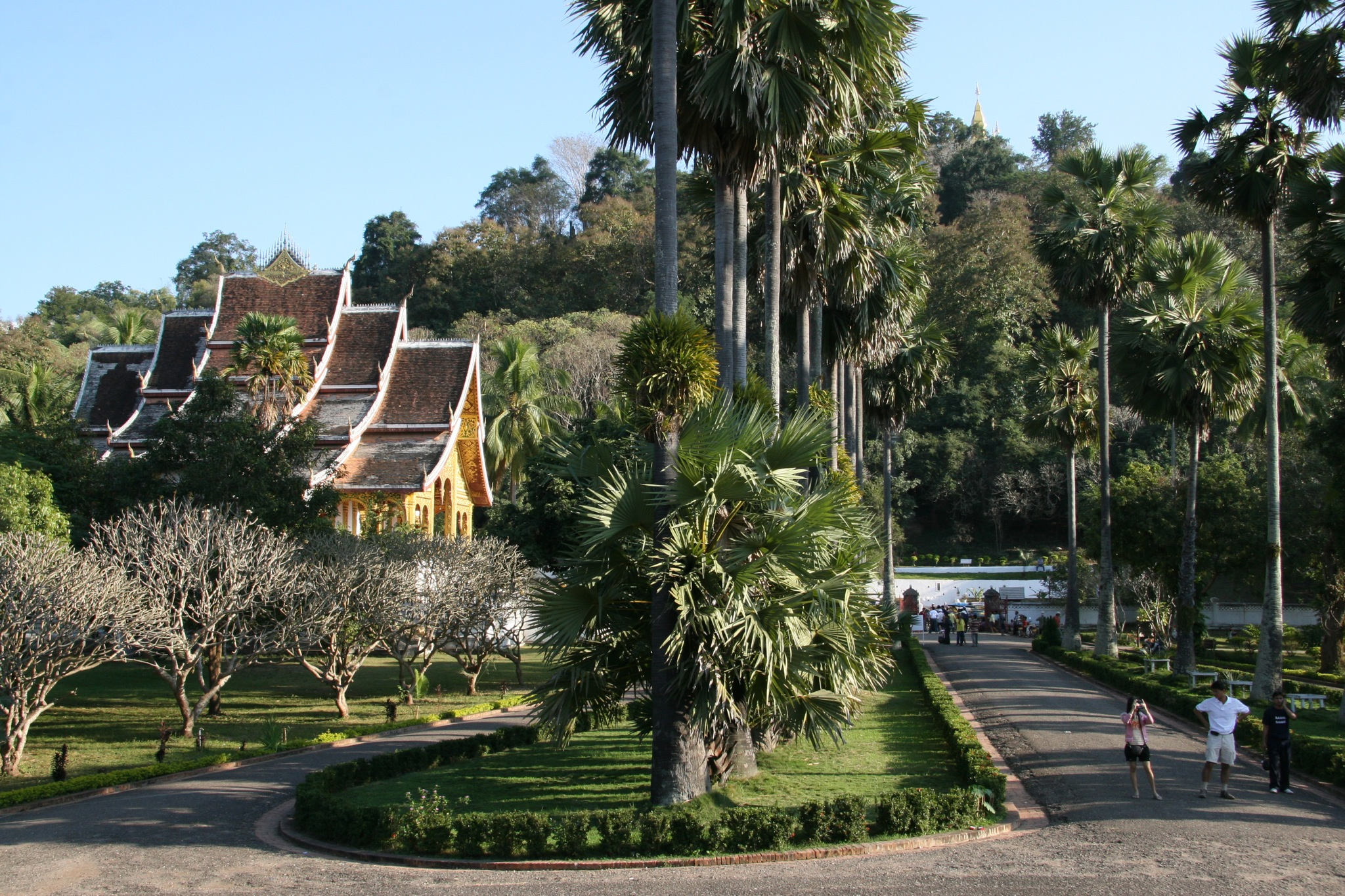
Haw Pha Bang

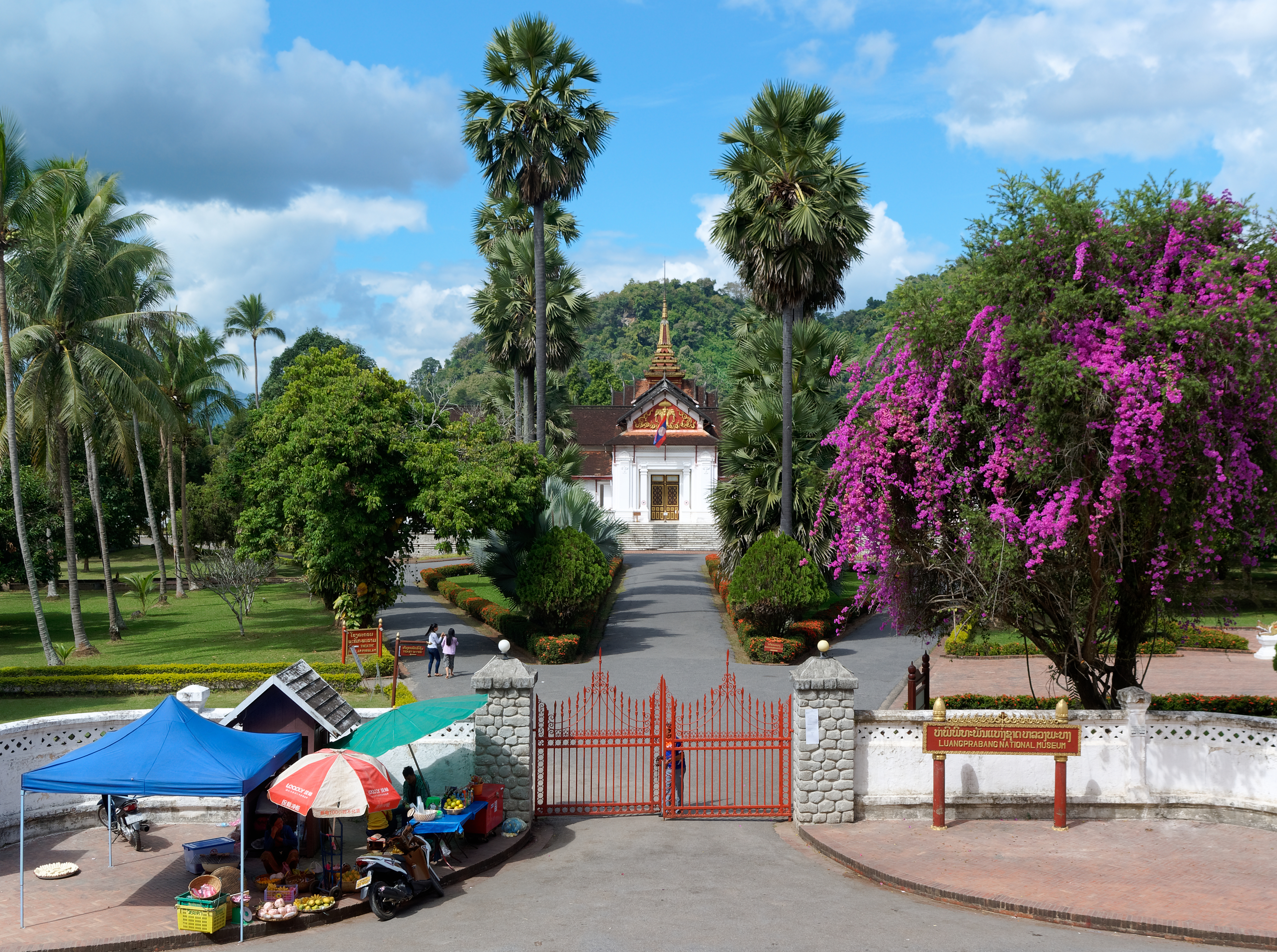
Luang Prabang National Museum

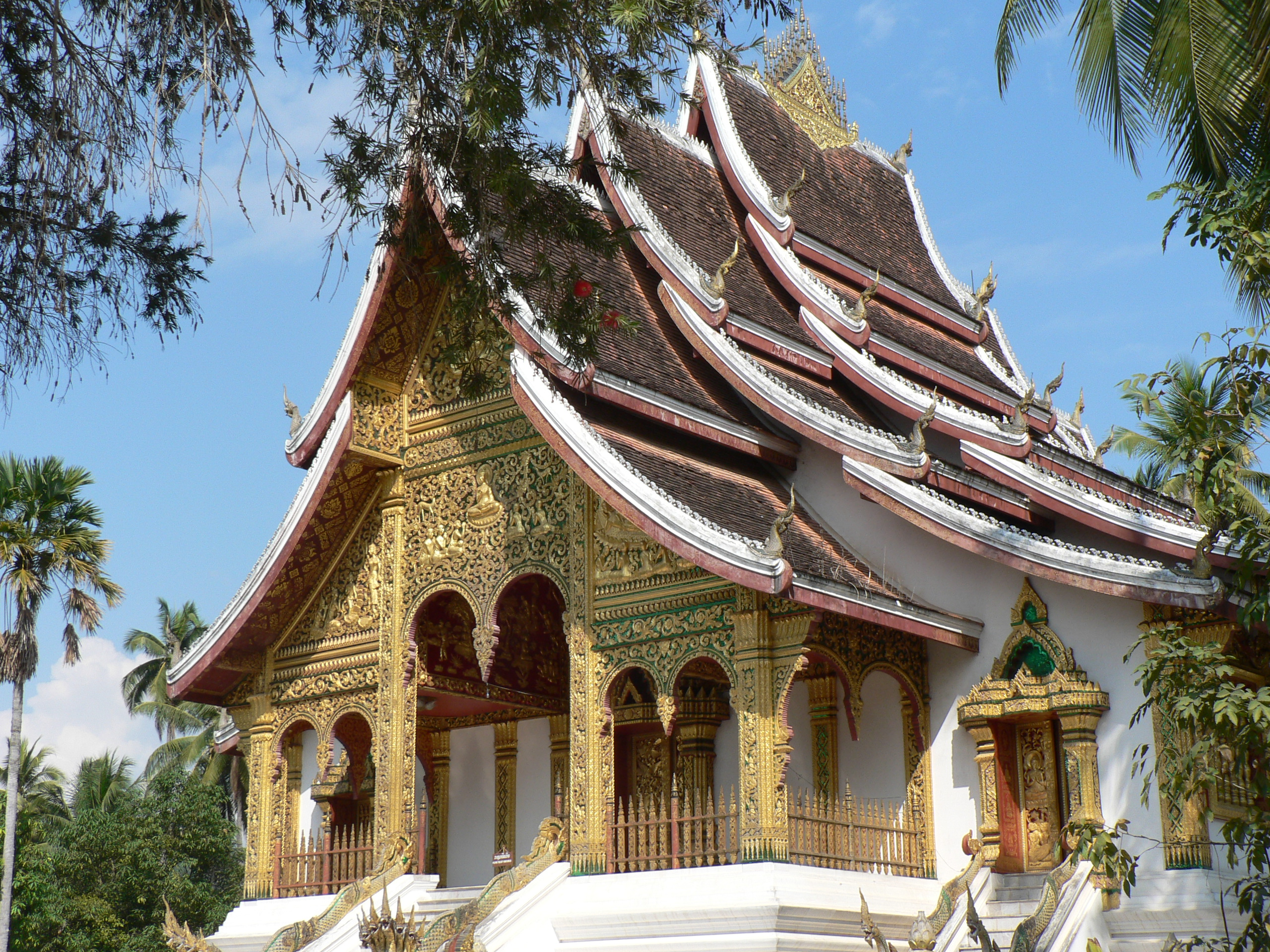
Temple at Royal Palace

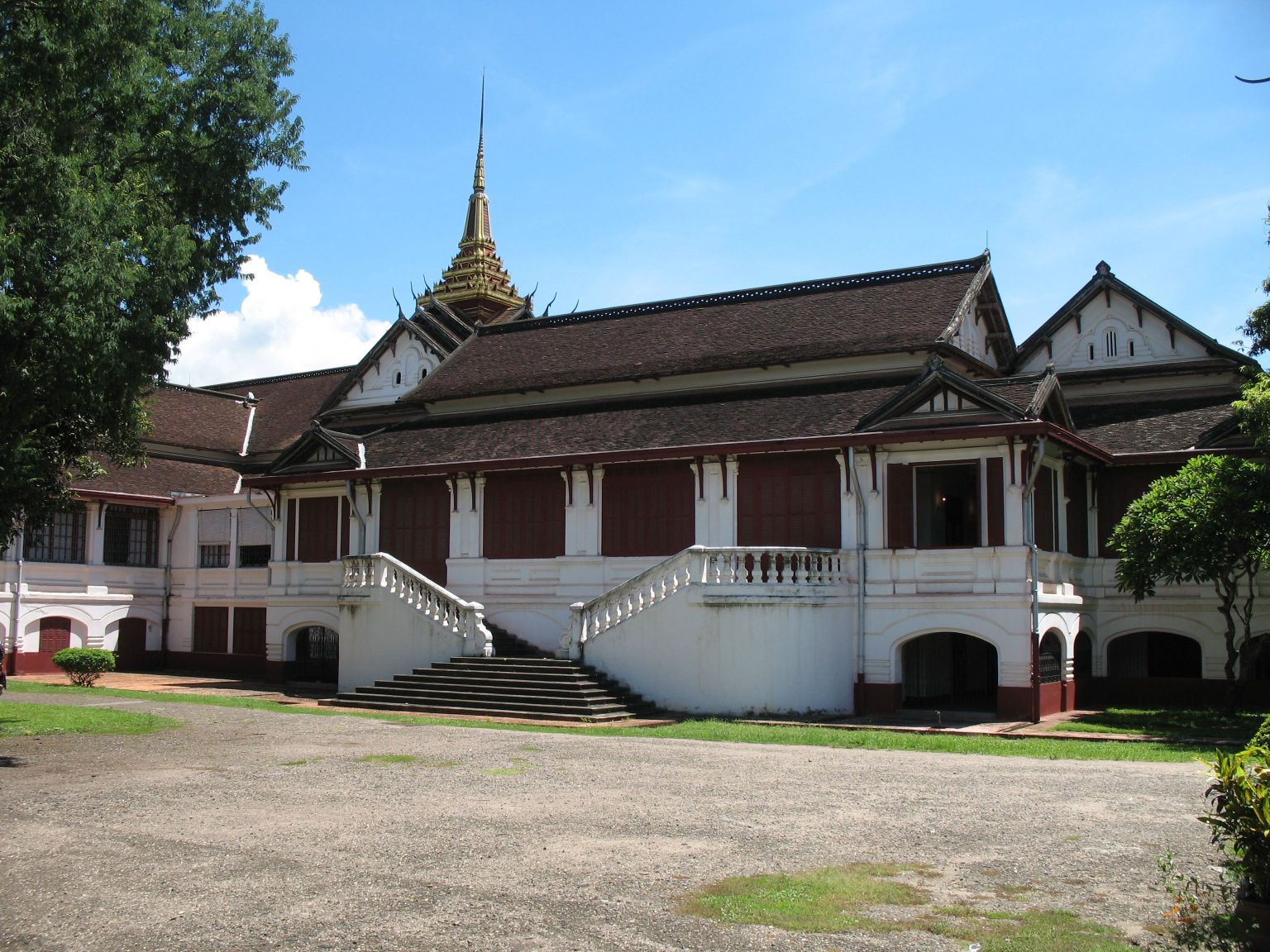

== Literature ==
- Lenzi, Iola (2004). Museums of Southeast Asia. Singapore: Archipelago Press. p. 200. ISBN 981-4068-96-9.
- Cummings, Joe (2002). Lonely Planet Laos. Lonely Planet. p. 352 pages. ISBN 1-86450-373-4.
