= Vang Tao Incident =

Terrorist incident in Laos

Coordinates: 15°07′53″N 105°28′10″E

Vang Tao Outpost (Laos)

The Vang Tao Incident occurred on 3 July 2000, when a group of armed insurgents and mercenaries attacked a Lao customs outpost at the southern border town of Vang Tao. The raiders, as they came to be described, were easily routed leaving six of their own dead and 27 were arrested by Thai authorities. Of those, 11 were Thai nationals.

The attack followed a series of bombings in Vientiane attributed to Hmong rebels and coincided with a month-long lobbying visit by Prince Sauryavong Savang and Crown Prince Soulivong Savang to the United States. Some analysts concluded that the raid was likely a demonstration to gain financial and political support from Laotians abroad.
