= Soulivong Savang =

Heir to the Lao throne

King of Laos (In Exile)
- Reign: 1980–present
- Predecessor: Vong Savang
- Born: 8 May 1963 (age 63); Luang Phrabang, Laos
- Spouse: Chansouk Soukthala (m. 2007)
- House: Khun Lo Dynasty
- Father: Vong Savang
- Mother: Mahneelai

Soulivong Savang (Lao: ສຸລິວົງ ສະຫວ່າງ; born 8 May 1963) is a grandson of the last King of Laos Sisavang Vatthana and the current heir to the Lao throne following the death of his father Vong Savang.

Laos was a monarchy until 1975, when the communist Pathet Lao seized control of the nation, causing Sisavang Vatthana to abdicate his throne. He was imprisoned and died at an uncertain time in the late 1970s or early 1980s. Soulivong Savang lives in exile in Paris.

== Biography ==
Soulivong Khantharinh was born on 8 May 1963 at the Royal Palace in Luang Prabang to Crown Prince Vong Savang and Crown Princess Mahneelai of the Kingdom of Laos.

After the communist revolution, some members of the royal family were placed in re-education camps where they reportedly died, although Prince Souphanouvong later became President of the newly established republic. Prince Khantharinh escaped from captivity in Laos with his younger brother Prince Thanyavong Savang in 1981, arriving in France as refugees.

== Education ==
Soulivong Savang attended the University of Clermont-Ferrand in France and also obtained a law degree.

== Political aspirations ==
He has been working to restore democracy as well as "social and charitable reforms" to Laos. "The restoration of the monarchy would be up to the Lao people", he said. His uncle Prince Sauryavong Savang was regarded as head of the Laotian royal family and acted as regent to his nephew. A Royal Lao Government in Exile exists.

On 19 September 1997, Soulivong Khantharinh and his Uncle Prince Sauryavong Khantharinh initiated a Royal Lao Conference in Seattle, Washington, United States. Over five hundred Lao exiles and representatives of the Hmong, Kmu, Mien, Thaidam and all ethnic minority community attended. This conference established the Lao Representative Abroad Council.

On 19 September 1999, a second conference was held in Montreal, Quebec, Canada, to follow up the progress of LRAC work and focus on non-profit organizations to support the local and worldwide community through community development, social services, education and job development, promoting cultural activity. Soulivong capitalized on the rise in royalist sentiment in neighbouring Thailand.

The Laotian exile community – 100,000 in France, 40,000 in Australia and half a million in the United States – has been fractured ethnically between Lao and Hmong. The crown prince said he tells both groups that a constitutional monarchy is their best hope of unity.

== Personal life ==
On 10 November 2007, the Prince married Princess Chansouk Soukthala. The ceremony, which took place in Mississauga, Ontario, Canada, was attended by 800 guests. The bride, Princess Chansouk, is a daughter of the former military Prosecutor Prince Tanh Soukthala and Princess Bounchanh Soukthala.

== See also ==
- Lao royal family
- Prince Souvanna Phouma
- Prince Phetsarath Ratanavongsa
- Pathet Lao
- Prince Souphanouvong

Soulivong Savang Khun Lo Dynasty Born: 8 May 1963
Titles in pretence
Preceded by Vong Savang	— TITULAR — King of Laos; 2 May 1978?/1980?/1984?- Reason for succession failure: Monarchy abolished in 1975 – Communist take over	Incumbent; Heir: Thayavong Savang
