= Thanyavong Savang =

Lao Prince

- Born: 17 April 1964 (age 62); Luang Phrabang, Laos
- Spouse: Princess Malika Khammao
- Issue: Prince Kiranvong Savang; Prince Anouratha Varman Savang; Princess Manisophana Savang; Princess Sawee Nahlee Savang; Princess Manilama Savang
Names
- Thanyavong Savang
- House: Khun Lo Dynasty
- Father: Vong Savang
- Mother: Mahneelai

Thanyavong Savang (Lao: ເຈົ້າທັນວົງ ສະຫວ່າງ, born 17 April 1964) is a surviving member of the now deposed royal family of the Kingdom of Laos. He was born at the Royal Palace, Luang Prabang, Laos. His father is Crown Prince Vong Savang and his mother is Princess Mahneelai.

== Biography ==
In 1981, he escaped from Luang Prabang to Vientiane, and then to Thailand with his older brother, Crown Prince Soulivong Savang. They arrived in France as political refugees.

On September 16th, 2001, he, along with Prince Sauryavong Savang, Princess Dalavan, Prince Soulivong Savang and the Lao Community in France made tribute to the victims of September 11 attacks. This was made with a religious ceremony "sak anicha", following the rites of Buddhism, in the Vat pagoda Vélouvanaram in Chamigny in Seine et Marne under the direction of the Vénérable Chanthi Souphanthavong.

He is currently exiled and living in Florida, USA, and is active in Lao communities abroad to help preserve and promote Lao culture.
