= Sauryavong Savang =

Laotian prince (1937–2018)

- Savang in 2012
- Born: 22 January 1937; Laos
- Died: 2 January 2018 (aged 80); Paris, France
- Spouse: Princess Dalavan
- Issue: Prince Sthira Sauryavong; Prince Dayavant Sauryavong; Princess Balavant Sauryavong; Princess Krishnajina Sauryavong; Princess Mariana Gilnaji Savang
- House: Khun Lo dynasty
- Father: Sisavang Vatthana
- Mother: Khamphoui

Prince Sauryavong Savang (22 January 1937 – 2 January 2018) was the youngest son of King Sisavang Vatthana of Laos.

== Biography ==
In 1965, he married Princess Dalavan and they had four children, Sthira Sauryavong, Dayavant Sauryavong, Balavant Sauryavong, and Krishnajina Sauryavong.

Control of the Kingdom of Laos was seized by communist forces in August 1975. In November 1975, the Prince escaped from Laos by swimming across the Mekong river to Thailand. He became head of the Laotian royal family and acted as regent for his nephew Crown Prince Soulivong Savang.

Prior to leaving Laos, he headed the Office of Crown Properties. He worked for Renault in France.

In September 1997, he and his nephews Crown Prince Soulivong Savang and Prince Thayavong Savang initiated a Royal Lao Conference in Seattle, United States, over three hundred Lao exiles and representatives of the Hmong community. A resolution was established at this historic meeting between the Lao and Hmong leaders and the royal family and it held the common goal to change "the totalitarian regime to a genuine democratic system", and "the reunification of the Lao people".

In July 2000, he came under harsh criticism from some quarters after allegedly ordering the Vang Tao raid; he denied prior knowledge of the military attack against the Communist government of Laos.

He worked along with other surviving members of the Laos royal family such as Prince Mangkra Souvannaphouma, Crown Prince Soulivong Savang and Prince Thayavong Savang to establish a constitutional monarchy in Laos.

He died in Paris on 2 January 2018.
