= Savivanh Savang =

Laotian princess (1933–2007)

- Princess Savang, aged 24, at her marriage ceremony, September 21 1957.
- Born: September 21 1933; Luang Phrabang
- Died: 4 January 2007 (aged 73); Nice, France
- Spouse: Prince Sisumang Manivong
- House: Khun Lo Dynasty
- Father: Sisavang Vatthana
- Mother: Khamphoui

Princess Savivanh Savang Manivong (September 21 1933 – 4 January 2007) was the daughter of King Savang Vatthana and Queen Khamphoui. She was educated in Luang Prabang, France and England, the princess served in the court of her father, the King of Laos, until the fall of the monarchy to communist forces in 1975. She went into exile in the city of Nice, France, where continued to politically pressure the communist government to provide human rights for women in Laos.
