= Vong Savang =

Last Crown Prince of Laos

- King Of Laos
- Vong Savang c. 1960s
- Born: 27 September 1931; Luang Phrabang, Laos, French Indochina
- Died: 2 May 1978 (aged 46); Vieng Xai, Laos
- Spouse: Princess Mahneelai Panya (m. 1962)
- Issue: Prince Soulivong Savang; Prince Thanyavong Savang; Princess Manisophana Savang; Princess Sawee Nahlee Savang; Prince Kiranvong Savang; Prince Anourathavarman Savang
Names
- Vong Savang (or Varman Savangsa)
- House: Khun Lo Dynasty
- Father: Sisavang Vatthana
- Mother: Khamphoui

Vong Savang (Lao: ເຈົ້າຟ້າຊາຍມົງກຸດຣາຊະກຸມາຣວົງສະຫວ່າງ; 27 September 1931 – 2 May 1978) was the last Crown Prince of the Kingdom of Laos. After the Laotian Civil War in 1975, he and his family were arrested by the Pathet Lao and sent to re-education camps, where they died.

== Early life ==
He was born on 27 September 1931, at the Royal Palace Luang Prabang, Laos to King Savang Vatthana and Queen Khamphoui. He was educated at Montpellier University and later École sciences et politiques in Paris. He became the Crown Prince (Anga Mahkuta Raja Kumara) on 29 October 1962, and married Princess Mahneelai Panya (born 29 December 1941) on 4 August 1962. They had four sons and three daughters.

== Death ==
Having read the royal rescript of abdication of his father on 2 December 1975, he lived in a private residence with his family until 1977, when they were arrested and taken to northern Laos and placed in a re-education camp. He reportedly died there on 2 May 1978.

== Issue ==
The children of Vong Savang and Mahneelai are:

| Name | Birth | Death |
|---|---|---|
| Soulivong Savang | 8 May 1963 | |
| Thanyavong Savang | 17 April 1964 | |
| Manisophana Savang | 1965 | |
| Sawee Nahlee Savang | 1967 | |
| Kiranvong Savang | 1969 | |
| Manilama Savang | 1976 | |
| Anourathavarman Savang | 1978 | |

== Honours ==
=== National ===
- Knight Grand Cross of the Order of the Million Elephants and the White Parasol.
- Medal of the Reign of King Sisavang Vong, 1st class.
- Medal of the Reign of King Savang Vatthana, 1st class.

=== Foreign ===
- Japan : Knight Grand Cordon of the Supreme Order of the Chrysanthemum (April 1965).
- Cambodia : Knight Grand Cross of the Royal Order of Cambodia.
- Nepal : King Birendra Coronation Medal (24 February 1975).
- Thailand : King Rama IX Royal Cypher Medal, First Class (13 July 1962).

Vong Savang Khun Lo Dynasty Born: 27 September 1931 Died: -2 May 1978/1980?
Titles in pretence
| Preceded by Savang Vatthana | — TITULAR — King of Laos; March 1978?–2 May 1978/1980? Reason for succession failure: Monarchy abolished in 1975 – Communist take over | Succeeded by Soulivong Savang |
