= Sisavang Vatthana =

Last monarch of the Kingdom of Laos (reigned 1959–1975)

- King Of Laos
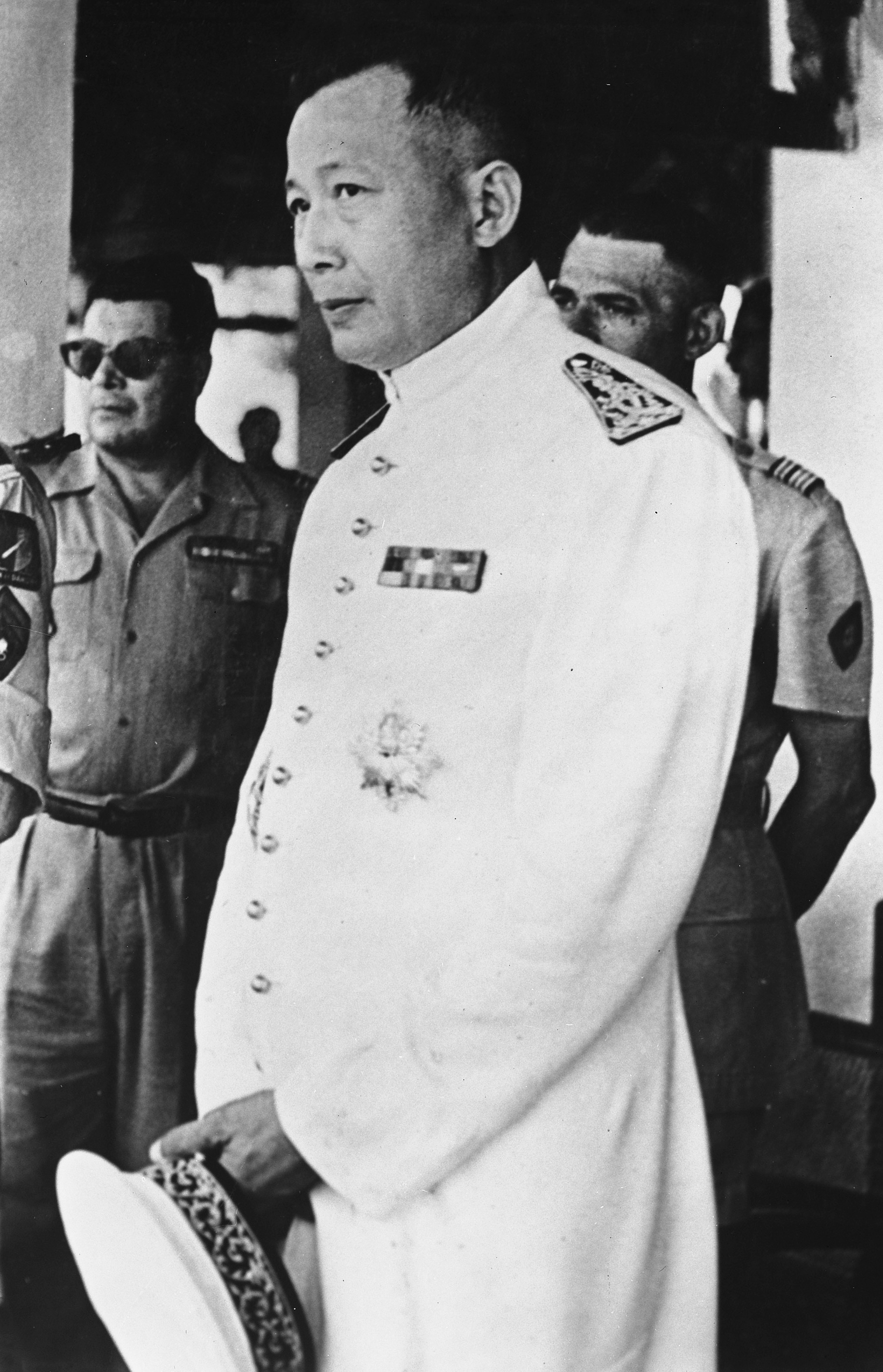
- Sisavang Vatthana on 3 November 1959, shortly after his accession upon the death of his father on 29 October

King of Laos
- Reign: 29 October 1959 – 2 December 1975
- Predecessor: Sisavang Vong
- Successor: Monarchy abolished; Prince Souphanouvong as president
- Prime Ministers: See list: Phoui Sananikone Sounthone Pathammavong Kou Abhay Somsanith Vongkotrattana Souvanna Phouma Quinim Pholsena (Disputed) Boun Oum
- Born: 13 November 1907; Luang Phrabang, Laos, French Indochina
- Died: 13 May 1978 (aged 70); Sam Neua, Laos
- Spouse: Queen Khamphoui
- Issue: Crown Prince Vong Savang; Princess Savivanh Savang; Princess Thala Savang; Prince Sisavang Savang; Prince Sauryavong Savang
- House: Khun Lo Dynasty
- Father: Sisavang Vong
- Mother: Kham-Oun I
- Religion: Theravada Buddhism

Prime Minister of Laos
- In office 15 October 1951 – 21 November 1951
- Monarch: Sisavang Vong
- Preceded by: Phoui Sananikone
- Succeeded by: Souvanna Phouma

Sisavang Vatthana (Lao: ພຣະບາທສົມເດັຈພຣະເຈົ້າມະຫາຊີວິຕສີສວ່າງວັດທະນາ) or sometimes Savang Vatthana (full title: Samdach Brhat Chao Mavattaha Sri Vitha Lan Xang Hom Khao Phra Rajanachakra Lao Phengdara Parama Sidha Khattiya Suriya Varman Brhat Maha Sri Savangsa Vadhana; 13 November 1907 – 13 May 1978) was the last king of the Kingdom of Laos and the 6th prime minister of Laos serving from 29 October to 21 November 1951. He ruled from 1959 after his father's death until his forced abdication in 1975. His rule ended with the takeover by the Pathet Lao in 1975, after which he and his family were sent to a re-education camp by the new government.

== Early life and education ==
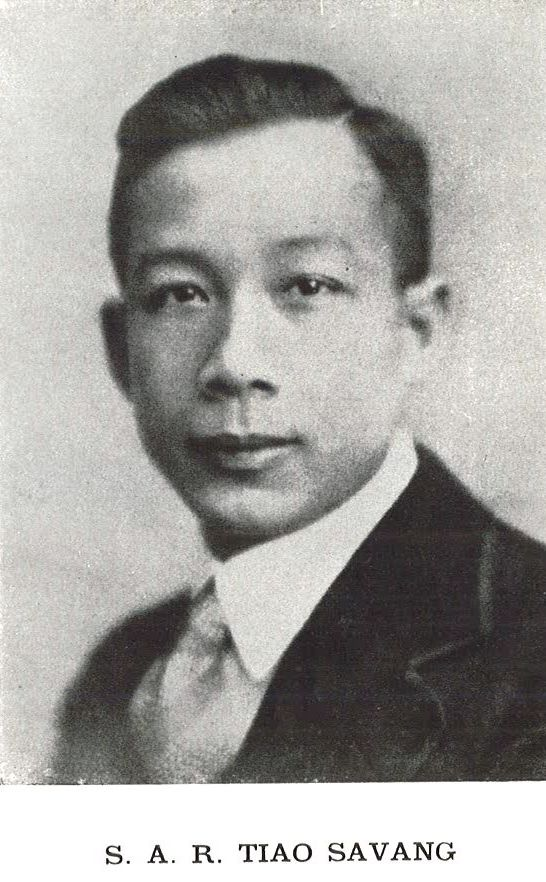
Prince Savang in 1943

Savang Vatthana was the son of Sisavang Vong, who later became King of Laos. He was a cousin of Prince Souvanna Phouma. At the age of ten, he was sent to France, where he attended a lycée in Montpellier and then the École Libre des Sciences Politiques, now Sciences Po, in Paris. According to Time, after a decade abroad he could no longer speak Lao, and he had to be instructed by a palace functionary for years after his return.

He married Khamphoui, a cousin. Unlike his polygamous father, he took only one wife, and the couple had five children.

== Crown prince ==
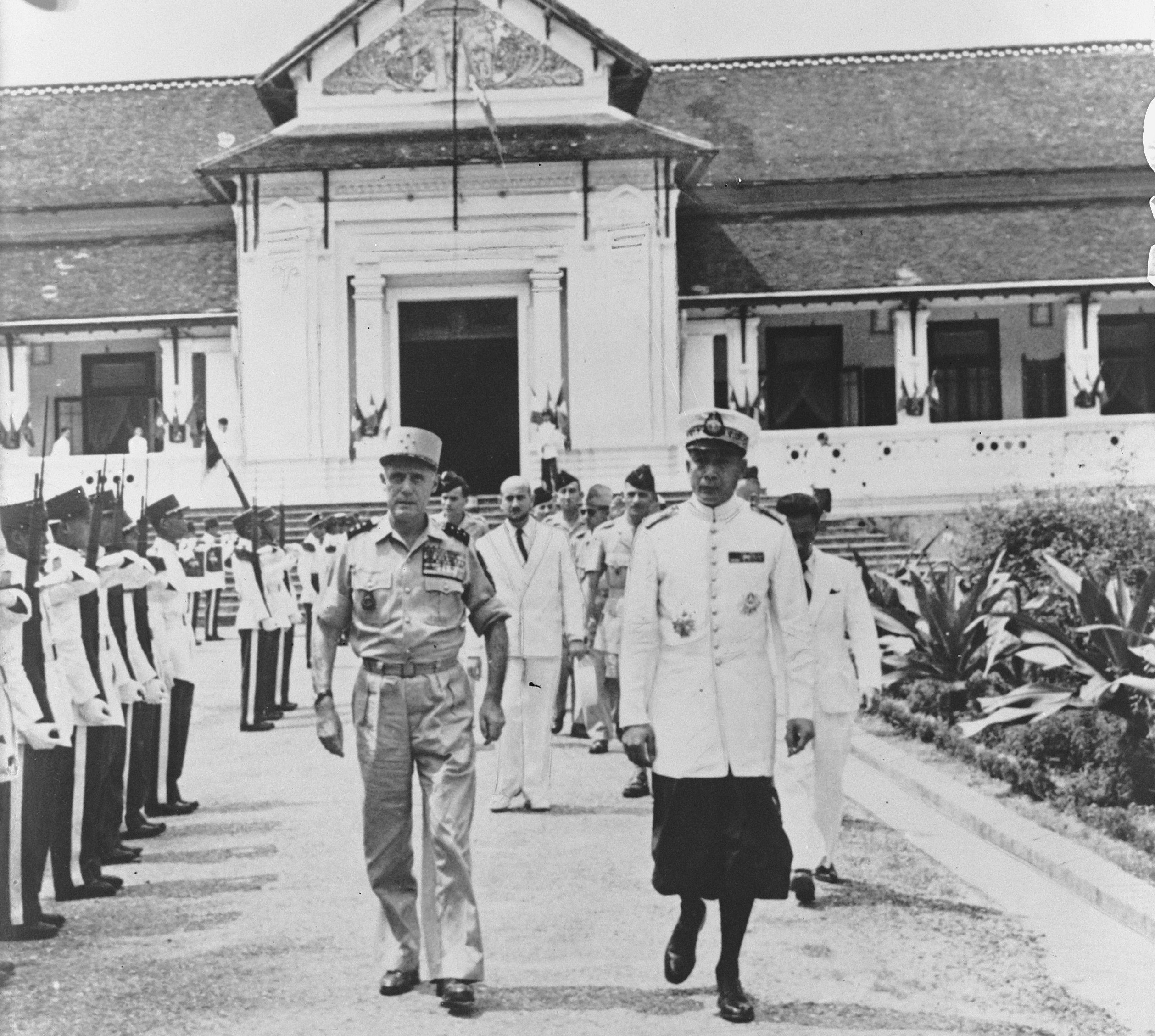
French General Salan and Prince Savang in Luang Prabang, 4 May 1953

Under an arrangement made with the French in 1941, Savang Vatthana, as crown prince, became chairman of the King's Council.

After Japan overthrew the French administration in Indochina in March 1945, his father sent him to the Japanese headquarters in Saigon, where he vigorously protested against the Japanese actions in Laos. Although he brought money back from Saigon, the government's coffers were empty by the end of June 1945.

== Reign ==
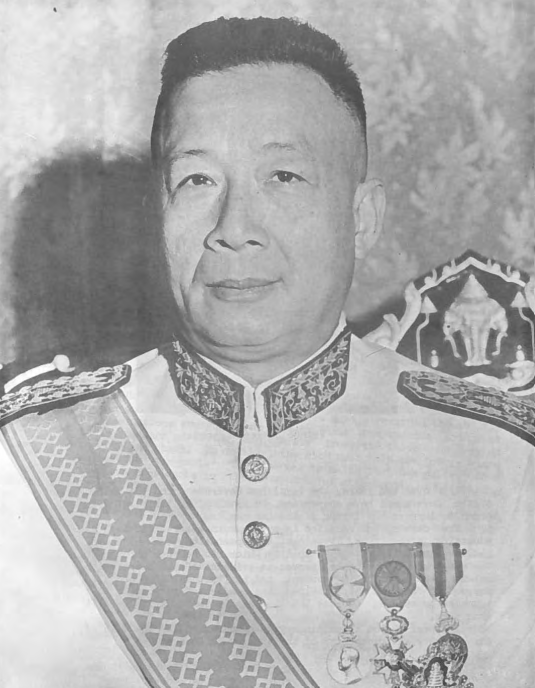
King Savang in 1964

Savang Vatthana succeeded to the throne in 1959, after his father died at the age of 74. His father's cremation took place in Luang Prabang in April 1961, after the body had lain in a sandalwood coffin for 18 months. He was never formally crowned, and he postponed his coronation until the end of the war.

In 1961, Time described the king as a "rather puritanical fellow" who had clashed with his father, and wrote that his "most striking characteristic politically is a lethargy so profound that it is almost spectacular". He was devoted to Buddhism and guarded a sacred Buddha image in the belief that "as long as the Buddha is in our hands, the country is safe". A reviewer of Christopher Kremmer's history of the dynasty described him as gentle and devout, and more absorbed in his orchards than in government.

=== Civil war and neutrality ===
After a coup by Captain Kong Le in August 1960 and the Battle of Vientiane in December, the National Assembly voted confidence in a government led by Prince Boun Oum on 4 January 1961, while the ousted neutralist prime minister, Souvanna Phouma, maintained that he was still legally in office. After the 1962 Geneva agreements on the neutrality of Laos, Souvanna Phouma headed a coalition government.

In early 1963, accompanied by Souvanna Phouma, the king toured countries that had signed the Geneva agreements, visiting the Soviet Union before travelling to the United States, with Poland, China and North Vietnam to follow. He was in the United States from 21 to 27 February 1963, including a state visit to Washington on 25–27 February, where he met President John F. Kennedy. He told Kennedy that "up to the present the Crown has kept outside any partisan politics", and that the Laotian problem was part of a broader context in which China had to be taken into account. In a joint statement, the king reaffirmed his country's support for the Geneva agreements, and Kennedy said that respect for Lao neutrality, independence and sovereignty remained the basis of American policy.

In April 1967, the king and queen received the Australian prime minister Harold Holt at Luang Prabang. The reviewer of Kremmer's book wrote that in the 1960s the king allowed the United States to bomb guerrilla-held territory in the northeast, and that he and Souvanna Phouma pursued a policy of appeasement.

== Abdication and imprisonment ==
After the Pathet Lao gained control of the country in 1975, Souvanna Phouma and Prince Souphanouvong flew to Luang Prabang on 29 November and persuaded the king to abdicate. The Lao People's Democratic Republic was proclaimed on 2 December 1975, and the former king was given the title of supreme adviser to the president.

The new regime feared that the former king could become a symbol of popular resistance. According to The Christian Science Monitor, the communists did not kill him outright, partly because he had a relative in the party, but judged him too powerful a symbol to leave free. In 1977, he was moved with the queen and the crown prince to Camp 01 in Houaphan province. He was held in "Camp Number One", which held high-ranking officials of the former government. He was the oldest prisoner in the camp, and he turned 70 during the early months of his imprisonment, whereas the average age of the prisoners was about 55.

== Death ==
According to the Library of Congress country study of Laos, the crown prince died in Camp 01 on 2 May 1978, and the king died eleven days later of starvation. The queen died in December 1981, and all three were reportedly buried in unmarked graves without any official announcement. A letter published in The New York Times in 1990 cited a 1987 report in World Press Review that the king and the crown prince had died within eleven days of each other in May 1978.

The government confirmed the deaths only in December 1989, when Kaysone Phomvihane, during a visit to France, acknowledged the king's death in a passing remark that attributed it to old age. Accounts of the date differ. Kremmer, drawing on the memoir of a former prisoner, Khamphan Thammakhanty, concluded that the king died about two months after the crown prince, around 1980, and was buried in an unmarked grave. The Christian Science Monitor reported in 1993 that Laotians had learned of his death only in 1991.

The royal palace in Luang Prabang was preserved largely as he had left it, with gifts he had received, including fragments of the Moon from Richard Nixon and a silver desk set from John F. Kennedy. His former chef recalled him as a kind man who loved French food and read Proust.

== Honours ==
- Thailand
  - Order of the Rajamitrabhorn, Knight (1963)

== See also ==
- King Sisavang Vong
- Monarchs of Laos
- Pathet Lao
- Kingdom of Laos
- Soth Phetrasy
- Lao royal family

Sisavang Vatthana Khun Lo Dynasty Cadet branch of the 1984? Born: 13 November 1907 Died: March 1978?/13 May
Regnal titles
Preceded by Sisavang Vong	King of Laos; 29 October 1959 – 2 December 1975	Monarchy abolished Communist takeover
Political offices
Preceded by Sisavang Vong as King of Laos	Head of State of Laos as King of Laos; 29 October 1959 – 2 December 1975	Succeeded by Prince Souphanouvong as President of Laos
Preceded by Phoui Sananikone	Prime Minister of Laos; 15 October 1951 – 21 November 1951	Succeeded by Prince Souvanna Phouma
Titles in pretence
New title	— TITULAR — King of Laos; 2 December 1975 – March 1978?/13 May 1984?	Succeeded by Vong Savang
