= Khamphoui =

- Queen Consort of Laos

Queen Consort of Laos
- Tenure: 29 October 1959 – 2 December 1975
- Born: 12 July 1912; Luang Prabang, Laos, French Indochina
- Died: 12 December 1981 (aged 69); Sop Hao, Laos
- Spouse: Sisavang Vatthana
- Issue: Crown Prince Vong Savang; Princess Savivanh Savang; Princess Thala Savang; Prince Sisavang Savang; Prince Sauryavong Savang
- Father: Chao Krum Mahasenapati
- Mother: Khamoune

Khamphoui (Lao: ພຣະອັຄຣະມະເຫສີເຈົ້າຍິງຄຳຜຸຍ/ພຣະນາງຄຳຜຸຍ; 12 July 1912 – 12 December 1981) was Queen of Laos as the wife of Sisavang Vatthana, the second (and last) King of Laos. She was arrested with the rest of her family and reportedly died in a re-education camp in 1982.

== Early life ==
She was born in Luang Prabang, then capital city of the Kingdom of Luang Prabang (now part of Laos) in French Indochina, on 12 July 1912.

On 7 August 1930, she married Sisavang Vatthana and they had five children: Crown Prince Vong Savang, Prince Savang, Prince Sauryavong Savang, Princess Savivanh Savang, and Princess Thala Savang. She had a happy marriage with King Sisavang Vatthana, who abolished polygamy.

== Queen of Laos ==
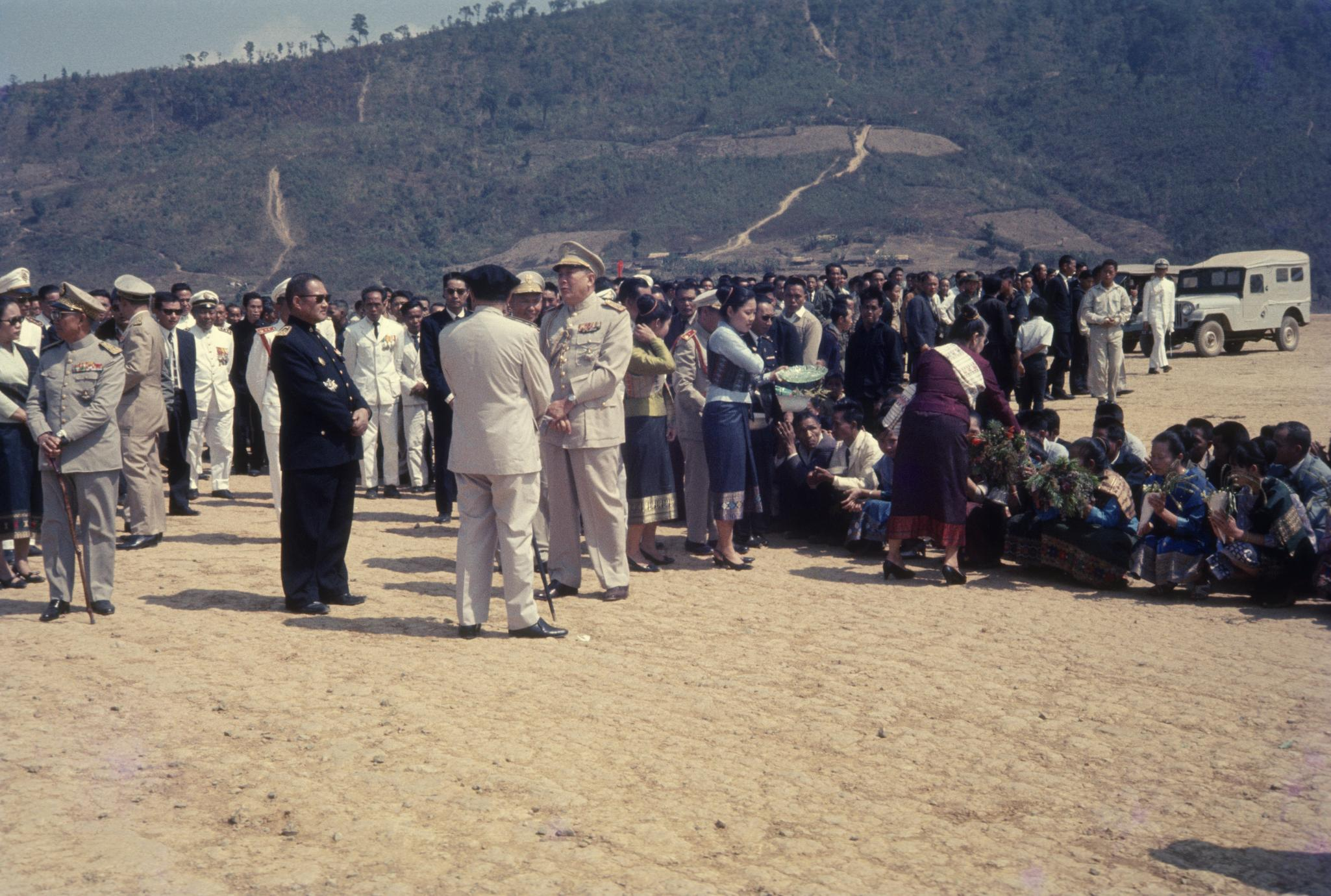
King Savang Vatthana, Queen Khamphoui, Chao Saykham (Xieng kouang governor), Prime Minister Souvanna Phouma, Gen. Vang Pao, and more others during king visit in Sam Thong, 1968.

She became Queen Consort of Laos in late October 1959. As queen, she and her husband attended public events and ceremonies. In 1963, she accompanied the king on an official state visit to the United States, where they were hosted by US President, John Kennedy.

Her husband was forced to abdicate the throne on 2 December 1975. After the coup, the former royal couple lived in house arrest in the former royal palace. She was arrested in 1977 along with the former King and her family, and sent to a Communist 're-education camp'. After their arrest, the former Royal Palace was made in to a museum.

She reportedly died in 1982 in a Communist 're-education camp' in northern Laos along with her husband and their son Crown Prince Vong Savang, probably around Sop Hao.

=== Honours ===
- (Thailand) Dame Grand Cross of the Order of Chula Chom Klao
