= List of Boholanos =

This is a list of Boholano by blood and affinity.

Prominent Boholanos include Philippine president Carlos P. Garcia, Francisco Dagohoy, and Datu Sikatuna.

== Heroes ==
- Francisco Dagohoy of Inabanga, Bohol who led the longest Philippine revolt against the Spaniards
- Tamblot, babaylan or priest to a local diwata (deity) who stirred up a religiously-motivated uprising against the Spaniards
- Datu Sikatuna, Boholano chieftain who was part of the famous blood compact with Miguel Lopez de Legazpi

== Arts and culture ==
- Napoleon Abueva, Father of Modern Philippine Sculpture, national artist
- Karyapa, first known poet of the Philippines

== Scientists, researchers and discoverers ==
- Czarina Saloma, sociologist
- Caesar Saloma, applied physicist, 9th chancellor of UP-Diliman
- Filemon Cloma, discoverer of Kalayaan Islands
- Tomas Cloma, honorary vice-admiral, father of Philippine Maritime Education, and founder of PMI Colleges.
- Leonardo O. Munalim,, applied linguist and educator, 16th among PH linguists in 2025 AD Scientific Index Google Scholar

== Public service ==
- Carlos P. Garcia of Talibon, Bohol - the 8th President of the Philippines
- Jose A. Clarin, senator
- Olegario Clarin, senator
- Juan Torralba, senator
- Ernesto Herrera, senator
- Leoncio Evasco Jr., cabinet secretary
- Ernesto Pernia, secretary and director of NEDA
- Julius Caesar Herrera, Assistant Executive Secretary of the SSS commission in 1985 and then Labor Arbiter of the National Labor Relations commissions - Region VII in 1986, President of (VGLP)Vice Governor's League of the Philippines 3rd term First time in the history in Vice governor's League
- Jane Censoria Cajes, Sangguniang Kabataan National Federation President, 2007-2010
- Edwin Lacierda of Loon, Bohol, the Presidential Spokesperson of President Benigno Aquino III.
- Conrado D. Marapao, governor of the "free" government in World War II.
- Romulo Neri of Loon - executive director of the National Economic and Development Authority (NEDA)
- Virgilio Mendez, former director of NBI
- Leonardo S. Esclamado of Duero, former Senior Superintendent of Philippine National Police, Region 10

== Education and research ==
- Cecilio Putong, secretary of Education
- Christopher Bernido, educator, Ramon Magsaysay Awardee
- José Abueva, educator, 16th president of University of the Philippines
- Florencio Ahat Ello, educator, 4th Department of Education Superintendent of South Cotabato province, 1969 to 1978 during the martial law era
- Leonardo O. Munalim, applied linguist and educator, 16th among PH linguists in 2025 AD Scientific Index Google Scholar
- Maria Victoria Carpio-Bernido, educator

== Religion ==
- Alberto Uy serves as the Metropolitan Archbishop of Cebu, having been appointed on July 16, 2025, after previously serving as the seventh Bishop of Tagbilaran since 2016.
- Romulo Valles, president of Catholic Bishops' Conference of the Philippines, Fourth Archbishop of the Archdiocese of Davao, fifth Archbishop of the Archdiocese of Zamboanga and Fourth Bishop of the Diocese of Kidapawan.
- Bernardito Auza, Apostolic nuncio to Spain
- Mariano Gaviola y Garces, former Archbishop of Lipa
- Cosme Damian Racines Almedilla, Third Bishop of the Diocese of Butuan.
- Crispin Varquez, current Bishop of the Diocese of Borongan.
- Rev Fr BGEN Raul Sabornido Ciño, Retired Chief Chaplain of the AFP

== Sports ==
- Lauro Mumar, FIBA World Championship medalist, Philippine National Basketball Hall of Famer
- Bernie Fabiosa, PBA legend, 25 Greatest Players of the PBA, played from 1975-1991
- Lawrence Mumar, basketball player and coach
- Nonito Donaire of Talibon- four-division world boxing champion
- Simeon Toribio of Carmen - Olympian, athletics
- Reynaldo Bautista, boxer
- Czar Amonsot, boxer
- Mark Magsayo, boxer
- Peter Naron, PBA playerd, drafted 1994
- Arvin Adovo, PBA player, drafted 2001
- Al Francis Tamsi, PBA player, drafted 2016
- Dexter Zamora, PBA player, drafted 2019

== Entertainment ==
- Cesar Montano - actor, director, host
- Yoyoy Villame, singer, king of Filipino novelty songs
- Luke Mejares, singer
- Giselle Sanchez, actress and comedian
- Sheree Bautista, actress and dancer
- Roberto Amay Bisaya Reyes, actor
- Colet Vergara / Maria Nicolette Florenosos Vergara - Member of P-pop Girl Group BINI (Main Singer, Lead Rapper, Lead Dancer)
- Rebecca Lusterio, actress
- Rebecca del Rio, actress
- Richelle Angalot, actress
- Maryo J. de los Reyes, film and television director
- Joan Almedilla, Broadway star in New York City
- Marco Sison, singer
- Jane De Leon, actress
- Yamyam Gucong, actor and comedian
- Hailee Steinfeld - singer, Hollywood actress (ancestral origins from Panglao, Bohol)
- Vivoree Esclito - actress, singer, television personality
- Karen Gallman - Binibining Pilipinas Intercontinental 2018 and Miss Intercontinental 2018
- Pauline Amelincx - Belgian-Filipino Model; Miss Supranational 2023 1st Runner Up
- Brian G. Smith - American YouTuber and farmer
