= Order of Civic Merit of Laos =

Order of Civic Merit Ordre de Mérite Civique ອິສະຣິຍາພອນພົນລະເມືອງດິແຫ່ງຊາດ
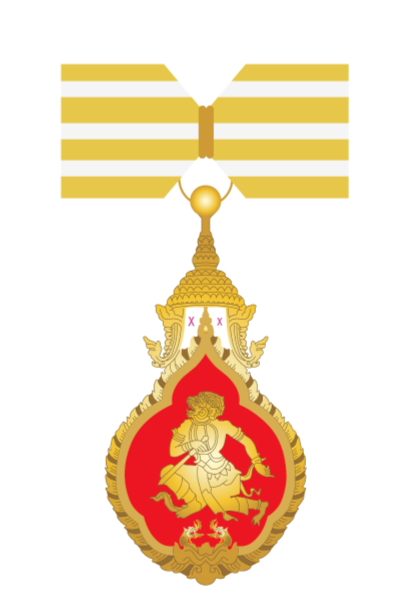
- Order of Civic Merit, class "Commander"
- Type: Order of Civic Merit
- Awarded for: Meritorious and courageous service to the State
- Description: Badge: Obverse: in center, gold figure of the King of the Monkey Army (Hanuman) clutching sword, on red enamel background, surrounded by frieze of small ribbon like protuberances, and at top fixed Royal Lao Crown suspension; Reverse: plain, 34mm across
- Presented by: Royal Lao Government in Exile
- Eligibility: Civil Officials and Military Officers
- Status: Currently awarded
- Established: November 20, 1950 under Royal Ordinance No. 186
- Ribbon of the order

The Order of Civic Merit of the Kingdom of Laos (Lao: ອິສະຣິຍາພອນພົນລະເມືອງດິແຫ່ງຊາດ Isarinyaphon Phonlameuongdi Aehngsad) was established on November 20, 1950 under Royal Ordinance No. 186 by H.M. Sisavang Phoulivong, The King of Laos. It is an Order of Civic Merit for civil officials and military officers. It was awarded for meritorious and courageous service to the State in three classes (1. Commander, 2. Officer, and 3. Knight). Until 1975 the approval authority was the Prime Minister of the Royal Lao Government. The current approval authority is H.E. Professor Maha Khamphoui Sisavatdy, Prime Minister of the Royal Lao Government in Exile as an elected successor to the Office of the Prime Minister of the Royal Lao Government.

== Classes and insignia ==
- Commander (ຕະຕິຍາພອນ Tatiyaphon)

Design: gold badge (Obverse: in center, gold figure of the King of the Monkey Army (Hanuman) clutching sword, on red enamel background, surrounded by frieze of small ribbon like protuberances, and at top fixed Royal Lao Crown suspension; Reverse: plain), 34mm across, suspended from a cravat. Ribbon: 36mm; orange yellow 7mm, white 3mm, orange yellow 6½mm, white 3mm, orange yellow 6½mm, white 3mm orange yellow 7mm; Service bar – with rosette and silver wings.

- Officer (ຈະຕູດຖາພອນ Jatutaphon)

Design: gold breast badge (Obverse: in center, gold figure of the King of the Monkey Army (Hanuman) clutching sword, on red enamel background, surrounded by frieze of small ribbon like protuberances, and at top fixed Royal Lao Crown suspension; Reverse: plain), 34mm across, with rosette on suspension ribbon. Ribbon: 36mm; orange yellow 7mm, white 3mm, orange yellow 6½mm, white 3mm, orange yellow 6½mm, white 3mm orange yellow 7mm; Service bar – with rosette.

- Knight (ປັນຈະມາພອນ Banjamaphon)

Design: silver breast badge (Obverse: in center, silver figure of the King of the Monkey Army (Hanuman) clutching sword, on red enamel background, surrounded by frieze of small ribbon like protuberances, and at top fixed Royal Lao Crown suspension; Reverse: plain), 34mm across, with suspension ribbon. Ribbon: 36mm; orange yellow 7mm, white 3mm, orange yellow 6½mm, white 3mm, orange yellow 6½mm, white 3mm orange yellow 7mm; Service bar – without rosette.

Insignia
| Commander | Officer | Knight |

== Distinguished knights and dames ==
- H.M. Sisavang Vatthana of Laos
- H.R.H. Prince Sauryavong Savang, Prince Regent of Laos
- H.E. Souvanna Phouma, Prime Minister of Kingdom of Laos 1962-1975
- Keo Viphakone, diplomat and politician (2021)
- Sergey Lavrov, foreign minister of Russia since (2008)
