= Koul Panha =

- គល់ បញ្ញា
- Born: Phnom Penh, Cambodia
- Education: Master's degree
- Occupation: Human rights activist
- Years active: 1993-date
- Organization(s): COMFREL (The committee for Free and Fair Elections in Cambodia)
- Awards: Ramon Magsaysay Award

Koul Panha (Khmer: គល់ បញ្ញា) is an executive director of a non-governmental organization COMFREL (The Committee for Free and Fair Elections in Cambodia) in Cambodia. COMFREL was established in 1997 with an aim to facilitate free, fair and meaningful elections in Cambodia. Koul took charge as Executive Director of COMFREL in 1998.

== Early life ==
Panha was eight years old when his father and relatives were killed due to the Khmer Rouge regime in Cambodia. He started teaching in capital city of Cambodia, Phnom Penh after having attained his university degree. By the early 1990s, he got involved in the human rights movement in Cambodia and also worked for Free and Fair elections. After joining COMFREL, Koul completed his master's degree in Politics of Alternative Development.

== Ramon Magsaysay Award ==
In 2011, Koul Panha was awarded the Ramon Magsaysay Award for his work for Electoral reforms in Cambodia.

== See also ==
- Ramon Magsaysay Award
- Oung Chanthol
- List of Ramon Magsaysay Award winners
