= Koto Matsudaira =

Japanese diplomat

- Born: 5 February 1903; Tokyo, Japan
- Died: 4 May 1994 (aged 91)
- Resting place: Myōkei-ji, Kanazawa, Ishikawa; 36°33′25.9″N 136°38′59.9″E
- Education: Tokyo Imperial University
- Occupation: Diplomat
- Spouses: Ai Yuhara; Marita Matsudaira
- Children: 1
- Parents: Ichisaburō Matsudaira (father); Tami Yamamura (mother)

Koto Matsudaira (松平 康東, Matsudaira Kōtō; 5 February 1903 – 4 May 1994) was a Japanese diplomat who served as an ambassador to the United Nations from 1957 to 1961.

== Biography ==
Matsudaira was born in Tokyo on 5 February 1903, the eldest son of Ichisaburō Matsudaira, a shipowner, and Tami Yamamura. He attended high school in Tokyo and then studied law at Tokyo Imperial University. Although he entered foreign service in 1926, he attained an academic degree in 1927. He then went to Paris where he received a Juris Doctor in 1931. That same year, he also obtained a diploma from the École Libre des Sciences Politiques.

Matsudaira first joined the League of Nations as a Japanese delegate to Geneva in 1932. Two years later, he was sent to the contract department of the Japanese Foreign Office until early 1941. Matsudaira then served as the first secretary at the Embassy of Japan in Washington, D.C. where his uncle Saburō Kurusu also worked. After the attack on Pearl Harbor, he was interned there along with Kurusu until being repatriated to Japan. In 1944, he went to the Embassy of Japan in Moscow to serve as the first secretary. He helped negotiate a draft of the Treaty of San Francisco in 1951.

He was appointed as the ambassador to Canada in March 1954, serving in that capacity until May 1957. He was then appointed as a Permanent Representative to the United Nations in May 1957 until May 1961.

When asked about the offensiveness of the term "Jap" on a television program by John Wingate on 7 June 1957, Matsudaira reportedly replied, "Oh, I don't care. It's a [sic?] English word. It's maybe American slang. I don't know. If you care, you are free to use it." Upon receiving a letter from Shosuke Sasaki about the topic on 5 July, Matsudaira asked one of his secretaries to write a reply. He apologized for his earlier remarks upon being interviewed by reporters from Honolulu and San Francisco on 5 August. He then pledged cooperation with the Japanese American Citizens League (JACL) to help eliminate the term "Jap" from daily use.

In 1958, when the United States sent its forces to Lebanon during the 1958 Lebanon crisis, Matsudaira considered the move debatable. Although he was prepared to support the resolution, Gunnar Jarring, upon being instructed by Östen Undén, declared that the move by the United States changed the fulfillment conditions for the resolution. Following Jarring's calls for suspending the activities of the UN in Lebanon, the Security Council held the debate until adjourning upon Matsudaira's suggestion. Later that year, Matsudaira served as President of the United Nations Security Council in October. He served in that position again in October 1959.

In 1960, Matsudaira attended a pioneer banquet hosted by the JACL, where he gave an address to several JACL members and Issei urging cooperation between nations for world peace.

In early 1961, in reference to Japan refusing a request by Dag Hammarskjöld to send Japan Self-Defense Forces officers to Lebanon in 1958, Matsudaira reportedly stated, "it is not consistent for Japan to preach UN cooperation on the one hand and to refuse all participation in UN forces." He later withdrew that statement after calls for resignation from opposition parties. Later that same year, he began serving as an ambassador to India.

In 1962, regarding the Sino-Indian War, Matsudaira insisted on Japanese support for India while warning against Chinese expansionism. On 9 November, when Matsudaira asked the Ministry of Foreign Affairs to give aid to India, Torao Ushiroku, who directed the Asian Bureau at the time, gave a brief response, saying that "Indians inherently expect others to assist them, but they never show any appreciation."

Matsudaira died on 4 May 1994. His resting place is at Myōkei-ji in Kanazawa, Ishikawa Prefecture.

== Personal life ==
Matsudaira was married to Ai Yuhara. In 1951, Matsudaira sent his daughter, Tokiko, to live with the family of Murray Sprung in New York City while attending school. Sprung met Matsudaira while helping prosecute Japanese war criminals. Sometime during his tenure in India, he remarried to his Chilean wife, Marita Matsudaira.

== Ancestry ==
Ancestors of Koto Matsudaira

4. Matsudaira Kōnyū
2. Ichisaburō Matsudaira
1. Koto Matsudaira
6. Yamamura Fusatoshi
3. Tami Yamamura

== Selected bibliography ==
- Le droit conventionnel international du Japon (The International Conventional Law of Japan, 1931)
- A Diplomat's Life

Diplomatic posts
Preceded by Sadao Iguchi	Japanese Ambassador to Canada; 1954–1957	Succeeded by Toru Hagiwara
Preceded by Toshikazu Kase	Japanese Ambassador to the United Nations; 1957–1961	Succeeded by Katsuo Okazaki
Preceded by Hashim Jawad	President of the United Nations Security Council; 1958	Succeeded by Jorge Illueca
Preceded by Egidio Ortona	President of the United Nations Security Council; 1959	Succeeded by Jorge Illueca
Preceded by Shiroshi Nasu	Japanese Ambassador to India; 1961–1965	Succeeded by Osamu Itagaki
