= Nababan =

Batak surname originating in Indonesia

Nababan is one of Toba Batak clans originating in North Sumatra, Indonesia. People of this clan bear the clan's name as their surname.

- Abdon Nababan (born 1964), Indonesian activist
- Hitler Nababan (born 1973), Indonesian politician
- Putra Nababan (born 1974), Indonesian journalist
- S. A. E. Nababan (1933-2021), Indonesian Lutheran minister
