= Nuon =

Nuon may refer to:

- Nuon (DVD technology), a technology for DVD players
- N.V. Nuon Energy, a utility company from the Netherlands
- Nuon Chea (1926–2019), Cambodian politician and war criminal
- Nuon Phaly (1942–2012), Cambodian human rights activist
- Nungon language of Papua New Guinea
