= Westenberg =

Westenberg is a surname. Notable people with the surname include:

- Hans Westenberg (1898–?), Dutch-Indonesian agriculturist
- Robert Westenberg (born 1953), American actor, acting teacher, and academic
