= Keo Viphakone =

Laotian civil servant (1917–2006)

Personal details
- Born: Henri Boucharon; 15 August 1917 Luang Prabang
- Died: 13 April 2006 (aged 88)
- Spouse: Khamboua Sengsathit
- Education: Sisawat College; Training Center for Indochina Inspectors of Water and Forests of Phnom Penh
- Awards: Ramon Magsaysay Award for Government Service; Order of the Million Elephants and the White Parasol; Medal of the Kingdom of Laos in Gold; Medal of the Lao Veterans Legion; Chevalier of the Legion of Honour

Henri Boucharon (15 August 1917 – 13 April 2006), better known by his adopted Lao name Keo Viphakone, was a Laotian diplomat, nationalist and public servant who demonstrated exemplary performance in his various government posts. For his achievements, he garnered several awards including Commander grade of the Order of the Million Elephants and the White Parasol, Chevalier of the Legion of Honour (1953), and Ramon Magsaysay Award for government service in 1967.

== Personal life and education ==
The eldest of seven children, Keo belonged to an upper-middle-class family in Luang Prabang. His father was a French soldier and for this, he could have been a French citizen. When Keo's father returned to France after suffering an illness, he had attempted to take Keo with him but Keo's grandmother refused to let her favorite grandson go. The same grandmother almost succeeded in keeping Keo away from school until a teacher found him playing by a Mekong River tributary and brought him back to school.

While his school records show that his birth date was April 15, 1920 making it seem that he was eight years old at the time of his school admission, Keo was actually already eleven years old when he started his primary education.

Finishing at the top of his class at the Lycee in Vientiane where he learned French and English, he went on to enroll in Sisawat College in 1939. At the onset of the Japanese occupation of Cambodia, Keo entered the Training Center for Indochina Inspectors of Water and Forests of Phnom Penh where he graduated with distinction in 1941.

== Career ==
After his studies in Cambodia, Keo returned to Laos to work at the Water and Forest Service. With Japan's defeat in World War II, Keo's nationalistic sentiments grew and he joined the Lao Issara movement. It was at this point in time when he decided to stop using his birth name.

Keo was appointed as chief of Cabinet by Prince Phetsarath Ratanavongsa when the latter established his government in October 1945. In 1946, French troops entered Laos and Lao Issara leaders including Keo were forced to flee to Thailand. While exiled, Keo started a charcoal-making and marketing project in order to raise funds for the Issara government. In 1949, Keo returned to Laos following the establishment of the Royal Lao Government and was named chief of the Forest and Land Division in the Ministry of Economic Affairs.

From 1951 to 1958, Keo lived as a diplomat, first at the French High Commission as representative of Laos. He was posted in Paris as First Secretary of the Lao Embassy in 1953 where he was made a Chevalier of the Legion of Honor for promoting friendship and understanding between Laos and France. At that time, he also served as Secretary General of the High Council of the French Union. He then served as counselor of the Royal Lao Embassy in Washington, D.C. From 195 to 1958 he was part of the Permanent Mission of Laos to the United Nations.

Keo returned to Laos in 1958 and took on the responsibility of improving the rural areas in Laos as administrator of the Rural Development Program. Challenges faced during those days were insufficient roads and bridges, schools, teachers, wells, sanitary facilities, dispensaries, and health workers. On the other hand, the ongoing fight between the government and the communists became a hindrance to development efforts. Obtaining foreign aid, Keo was able to pull off the Rural Development Plan with the construction of 701 schools; 153 dispensaries, markets, training centers, crematories and warehouses; 203.5 kilometers of roads; 72 bridges and 10 air strips; 14 irrigation systems, 44 water storage and flood control dams; and 15 fishponds. In addition, villagers and soldiers were trained in rural development techniques.

Under the 11th Royal Lao Government, Keo served as Minister of Economics and Rural Development Affairs from April 5, 1960, to August 9, 1960. From March 23, 1962, to June 1974, under the 14th Lao Three-Party Government, he was Vice-Minister of Social Welfare. He kept this post even after the government reshuffle under Souvanna Phouma’s 14th government.

As Laotian ambassador to France from December 1974, Keo sought political asylum in France with the ongoing war between the government and the Communists. He lived with his relatives while in Paris.

Later on as Secretary of State for Social Welfare, Keo gained the support of Filipino organization Operation Brotherhood to train workers needed in the programs that he developed. As Laos's demand for skilled labor increased, Keo initiated studies on labor laws in Laos which led to the creation of the Labor Department which shall focus on developing skilled manpower.

Throughout his career as public servant, Keo lived in integrity and simplicity, having a simple house and without even a car of his own.

== Honors ==
- Chevalier of the Legion of Honour (1953)
- Order of the Million Elephants and the White Parasol, Grand Cross with Collar and Commander grades
- Order of the Reign of Laos
- Order of Civic Merit of Laos
- Ramon Magsaysay Award for Government Service (1967)
- Combat Veteran’s Medal of Laos
- Medal of the Kingdom of Laos in Gold
- Medal of the Lao Veterans Legion
