= Pablo Torre =

Pablo Torre may refer to:

- Pablo Torre (director), Argentine producer, film director, and screenplay writer
- Pablo Torre (footballer) (born 2003), Spanish footballer
- Pablo Torre (journalist) (born 1985), American sportswriter

== See also ==
- Pablo Torres (disambiguation)
