= Yoon Hye-ran =

Community activist in Cheonan, South Korea

- Hangul: 윤혜란
- RR: Yun Hyeran
- MR: Yun Hyeran

Yoon Hye-ran (born 1969) is a community activist in Cheonan, South Korea. She established and initially managed the YMCA in Cheonan. In 1998 she founded Citizens Opening the World for Welfare (COWW) to address social welfare in Cheonan, especially for the elderly. She also founded the Citizens Alliance for a Walkable Cheonan and formed the Cheonan Ombudsman Group to monitor the city's social services. In 2005 she received the Ramon Magsaysay Award for Emergent Leadership.
