= Zacarias Sarian =

Filipino development journalist

Zacarias "Zac" Bolong Sarian was a Filipino development journalist and recipient of the 1974 Ramon Magsaysay Award for his work in the field. He had a foreign service degree from the University of the Philippines Diliman.

== Career ==
As the agriculture columnist for the Manila Chronicle in the 1960s, Sarian proposed and received funding for a monthly magazine on farming and gardening. He edited the magazine, called Philippine Farms and Gardens, from May 1964 until its last issue in September 1972. The magazine was among the large group of publications closed after the declaration of martial law by Ferdinand Marcos.

Sarian was the agriculture editor and columnist for the Manila Bulletin, a Philippine broadsheet.
