= Tony Tay =

Singaporean businessman

Tony Tay is a businessman and founder of volunteer group (Willing Hearts) that provides meals to poor people in Singapore. He is the recipient of Ramon Magsaysay Award in 2017.
