= Rosario and Silvino Encarnacion =

- Born: Rosario Encarnacion; January 15, 1910; Aliaga, Nueva Ecija, Philippine Islands Silvino Encarnacion; February 17, 1913; Muñoz , Nueva Ecija, Philippine Islands
- Died: 1989 (aged 78–79) (Rosario); November 1990 (aged 80) (Silvino)
- Occupations: Teacher (Rosario), Barangay liutenant (Silvino)
- Known for: Founders of the Barrio Bantug Credit Cooperative Union
- Awards: Ramon Magsaysay Award (1968)

Rosario and Silvino Encarnacion were a Filipino couple known for setting up the Barrio Bantug Credit Cooperative Union.

== Early lives ==
Rosario was born on January 15, 1910, in Aliaga, Nueva Ecija while Silvino was born on February 17, 1913, in Muñoz of the same province. Rosario was orphaned at a young age while Silvino's father was an elementary teacher who later worked as a farmer tending to public land in the barrio of Bantug. Rosario went to Cabanatuan for her high school education. She finished her studies in 1968.

== Advocacy ==
Rosario and Silvino Encarnacion became active in advocating for the rights of workers in Bantug. Half of the proceeds of the workers are often given to the landlords and used to pay debt. Silvino was a politician and was elected as barangay lieutenant in 1950, 1951, and 1958. They also provide shelter to foreigners. This include Angel Mandac who works for the Philippine Rural Reconstruction Movement (PRRM).

Mandac convinced the couple to establish a cooperative on April 1, 1960, the Barrio Bantug Credit Cooperative Union. The organization acted as a credit union providing loans to low income residents of Bantug. For their work with the cooperative, they were awarded the Ramon Magsaysay Award in 1968.

== Personal lives ==
Rosario and Silvino Encarnacion first met at an elementary school in Bantug, Muñoz where Rosario is employed as a teacher. They married on June 1, 1946.

== Deaths ==
Rosario retired from teaching in 1971 and later died in 1986. Silvino died in November 1990.
