= Lahpai Seng Raw =

- လဖိုင်ဆိုင်းရော်
- Born: 1949 (age 76–77)
- Education: Rangoon University
- Known for: Metta Development Foundation

Lahpai Seng Raw (Burmese: လဖိုင်ဆိုင်းရော်) is the founder of Myanmar's largest civil society group, Metta Development Foundation. Founded in 1997, the group runs healthcare, agriculture and peace projects in Kachin State. In July 2013, she was awarded a Ramon Magsaysay Award.

== Biography ==
Seng Raw earned a degree in psychology from Rangoon University; she began working with internally displaced people along the Myanmar-China border from 1987 to 1997. During that period, she became the development officer-in-charge in Kachin Independence Organization's humanitarian wing (ROKA). In 1997, she started the Metta Development Foundation, a non-government organization that helps displaced people of war afflicted zones in the country.
