= Augustine Joung Kang =

South Korean activist and credit union pioneer

- Born: Kang Joung-ryul; October 8, 1923; Wolji-ri, Haeun-myon, Ryonggang-gun, Pyongannam-do, Korea
- Died: August 22, 2009 (aged 85); Madison, Wisconsin, U.S.
- Awards: Ramon Magsaysay Award

Korean name
- Hangul: 강정렬
- Hanja: 康貞烈
- RR: Gang Jeongryeol
- MR: Kang Chŏngnyŏl

Augustine Joung Kang (October 8, 1923 – August 22, 2009) was a recipient of the Ramon Magsaysay Award for his practical democracy and use of regional cooperation to foster economically and humanly sound credit unions.
