= Ramon Magsaysay Award =

National award in Philippines

Ramon Magsaysay Award Gawad Ramon Magsaysay
- Awarded for: Outstanding contributions in Government Service, Public Service, Community Leadership, Journalism, Literature and Creative Communication Arts, Peace and International Understanding and Emergent Leadership
- Country: Philippines
- Presented by: Ramon Magsaysay Award Foundation
- First award: 1958
- Website: www.rmaward.asia

The Ramon Magsaysay Award (Filipino: Gawad Ramon Magsaysay) is an annual award established to perpetuate former Philippine President Ramon Magsaysay's example of integrity in governance, courageous service to the people, and pragmatic idealism within a democratic society. The prize was established in April 1957 by the trustees of the Rockefeller Brothers Fund based in New York City with the concurrence of the Philippine government. It is often called the "Nobel Prize of Asia".

== History ==
In May 1957, seven prominent Filipinos were named to the founding board of trustees of the Ramon Magsaysay Award Foundation, the non-profit corporation tasked with implementing the awards program. Later on, the board of trustees diversified and included prominent Asians from all over the Asian continent and outlying islands. The Ramon Magsaysay Award Foundation gives the prize to Asian individuals achieving excellence in their respective fields.

The award is named after Ramon Magsaysay, the seventh president of the Philippines. This has generated criticism due to allegations of brutal suppression of dissent and subserviency to the US government during Magsaysay's tenure as defense secretary and president.

== Award categories ==
The award recognizes and honors individuals and organizations in Asia regardless of race, creed, sex, or nationality, who have achieved distinction in their respective fields and have helped others generously without anticipating public recognition.

The awards used to be given in six categories, five of which were discontinued in 2009:

- Government Service (1958–2008)
- Public Service (1958–2008)
- Community Leadership (1958–2008)
- Journalism, Literature, and Creative Communication Arts (1958–2008)
- Peace and International Understanding (1958–2008)
- Emergent Leadership (since 2001)

== Awardees ==
The winners of the Ramon Magsaysay Awards come from different parts of Asia, although there are some instances where the winners came from countries outside Asia who had served, worked or accomplished something in different Asian countries. As of 2021, recipients have come from twenty-two Asian countries.

The following is a partial list of the awardees of the Ramon Magsaysay Award. Awardees' individual nationality or country of origin and citizenship are indicated.

Starting 2009, the Award is no longer being given in fixed categories except for Emergent Leadership.

=== Government Service (1958–2008) ===
To recognize outstanding service in the public interest in any branch of government, including the executive, judicial, legislative, or military.

Year	Image	Recipient	Nationality or Base Country	Citation
1958		Chiang Monlin (1886–1964)	Taiwan	"The Board of Trustees recognizes his distinguished leadership of the Chinese and American Commission that has been largely instrumental in bringing about significant improvements in the rural life of his countrymen."
1959		Sir Chintaman Dwarakanath Deshmukh (1896-1982)	India	"for their exemplary performance in the service of their respective governments. As our late president regarded government office as a public trust, this ideal has characterized the careers of the one in India and the other in the Philippines."
1959		Jose Vasquez Aguilar (1900–1980)	Philippines	"for their exemplary performance in the service of their respective governments. As our late president regarded government office as a public trust, this ideal has characterized the careers of the one in India and the other in the Philippines."
1960	Not awarded			
1961		Raden Kodijat (1890–1968)	Indonesia	"for his dedicated and skillful direction of the massive yaws eradication effort that is freeing his countrymen from a disfiguring and crippling disease."
1962		Francisca Reyes-Aquino (1899–1983)	Philippines	"her original research on Filipino folk dance and music, preserving this rich heritage for future generations."
1963		Akhtar Hameed Khan (1914–1999)	Pakistan	"for his inspiring personal commitment of experience, erudition and energy to scientific testing and application of a viable pattern for rural reform among his people."
1964		Yukiharu Miki (1903–1964)	Japan	"for his humanistic foresight in engineering rapid but orderly modernization, assuring well-being for the entire community."
1965		Puey Ungphakorn (1916–1999)	Thailand	"for his dedication, unquestioned integrity and high order of professional skill brought to the management of Thailand’s public finance."
1966		Fon Saengsingkaew (1907–1980)	Thailand	"his farsighted design in creating and staffing superior mental health services for his country."
1967		Keo Viphakone (1917–2006)	Laos	"his sustained initiative and integrity in inaugurating public services for Lao villagers under handicaps that easily could have excused defeat."
1968		Li Kwoh-ting (1910–2001)	Taiwan	"for his vigorous, rational guidance of Taiwan’s economy, generating one of the world’s most rapid rates of industrial growth."
1969		Hsu Shih-chu (b. ?)	Taiwan	"for his enthusiastic yet practical role in establishing on Taiwan's rural health, sanitation, and family planning services that are models for developing nations."
1970	Not awarded			
1971		Ali Sadikin (1926–2008)	Indonesia	"for his innovation, foresight and compassion in design and management of a modern administration giving residents of Indonesia's capital a sense of increased well-being in a finer community."
1972		Goh Keng Swee (1918–2010)	Singapore	"for his role in transforming Singapore's economy during 1960s"
1973		Balachandra Chakkingal Sekhar (1929–2006)	Malaysia	"for his leadership of scientific and technical advance that assure a more prosperous and stable future of rubber growers"
1974		Hiroshi Kuroki (1907–2001)	Japan	"for his role in modernizing Miyazaki Prefecture as its governor"
1975		Mohamed Suffian bin Moh. Hashim (1907–2001)	Malaysia	"for his uprightness and humanity in adapting western legal form to realities of his own plural society"
1976		Elsie Tu (1913–2015)	Hong Kong	"for his role in making Hong Kong Government more responsive to the less affluent"
1977		Benjamin Galstaun (1913–1989)	Indonesia	"for his role in guiding a new generation of Indonesians toward understanding and valuing animals and nature in Asia"
1978		Shahrum bin Yub (1934–2016)	Malaysia	"for his role in making a living museum an enlightening experience for all ages"
1986		Ben Mboi (1935–2015)	Indonesia	"for the couple's open-hearted invigoration of government and cooperating agencies in East Nusa Tenggara Province of Indonesia"
1986		Nafsiah Mboi (b. 1940)	Indonesia	"for the couple's open-hearted invigoration of government and cooperating agencies in East Nusa Tenggara Province of Indonesia"
1988		Miriam Defensor Santiago (1945–2016)	Philippines	"for bold and moral leadership in cleaning up a graft-ridden government agency."

=== Public Service (1958–2008) ===
To recognize outstanding service for the public good by a private citizen.

Year	Image	Recipient	Nationality or Base Country	Citation
1958		Mary Rutnam (1873–1962)	Canada; Ceylon	"for her gift of service to the Ceylonese people and the example she has set by her full life of dedication as a private citizen to the needs of others."
1959		Joaquin Vilallonga, S.J. (1868–1963)	Spain; Philippines	"for their compassionate concern for others whom society had cast aside."
1959		Tee Tee Luce (1895–1982)	Burma	"for their compassionate concern for others whom society had cast aside."
1960		Henry Holland (1875–1965)	United Kingdom; Pakistan	"for the selfless dedication of their renowned surgical skills to combat the blight of blindness in a remote hinterland."
1960		Ronald Holland (b. ?)	United Kingdom; Pakistan	"for the selfless dedication of their renowned surgical skills to combat the blight of blindness in a remote hinterland."
1961		Nilawan Pintong (1915–2017)	Thailand	"for her volunteer participation and leadership in developing constructive civic enterprises that have given women a new and creative role in Thailand."
1962		Horace Kadoorie (1902–1995)	United Kingdom; Hong Kong	"for their practical philanthropy working in partnership with Government and struggling cultivators to promote rural welfare in the Colony of Hong Kong."
1962		Lawrence Kadoorie (1899–1993)	United Kingdom; Hong Kong	"for their practical philanthropy working in partnership with Government and struggling cultivators to promote rural welfare in the Colony of Hong Kong."
1963		Helen Kim (1899–1970)	South Korea	"for her indomitable role in the emancipation and education of Korean women and sustained participation in civic affairs, symbolizing to Korean women their awakening."
1964		Nguyễn Lạc Hoá (1908–1989)	Vietnam	"for his extraordinary valor in defense of freedom, strengthening among a beleaguered people the resolution to resist tyranny."
1965		Jayaprakash Narayan (1902–1979)	India	"for his constructive articulation of a public conscience for modern India."
1966		Kim Yong-ki (1908–1988)	South Korea	"for his example of Christian principles practically applied to improve agriculture and imbue rural life with new joy and dignity."
1967		Sithiporn Kridakorn (1883–1971)	Thailand	"for vigorously defending the interests of Thai farmers, critically challenging government policies with the pragmatism of a man who knows the soil."
1968		Seiichi Tobata (1899–1983)	Japan	"for his incisive contributions toward modernization of Japan's agriculture and the sharing of its experience with developing nations."
1969		Kim Hyung-seo (b. ?)	South Korea	"for his sturdy, productive leadership of fellow refugees and other landless countrymen in reclaiming for themselves new agricultural land from the sea."
1970	Not awarded			
1971		Pedro Orata (1899–1989)	Philippines	"for his 44 years of creative work in education, particularly his conception and promotion of barrio high schools for rural Filipino youth."
1972		Cecile Guidote-Alvarez (b. 1943)	Philippines	"for their leadership in the renaissance of the performing arts, giving a new cultural content to popular life."
1972		Gilopez Kabayao (1929–2024)	Philippines	"for their leadership in the renaissance of the performing arts, giving a new cultural content to popular life."
1973		Bishop Antonio Fortich, D.D. (1913–2003)	Philippines	"for their engineering of an experiment in rural development giving small, indebted farmers in Dacongcogan Valley control of their livelihood and new hope."
1973		Benjamin Gaston (1913–1974)	Philippines	"for their engineering of an experiment in rural development giving small, indebted farmers in Dacongcogan Valley control of their livelihood and new hope."
1974		Madurai Shanmukhavadivu Subbulakshmi (1916–2004)	India	"for her exalting rendition of devotional song and magnanimous support of numerous public causes in India over four decades."
1975		Phra Chamroon Parnchand (1926–1999)	Thailand	"for curing thousands of drug addicts with unorthodox yet efficacious herbal and spiritual treatment in his monastery."
1976		Hermenegild Joseph Fernandez (1945–2010)	France; Sri Lanka	"for his effective teaching of skills, values and discipline that build underprivileged and delinquent boys into self-respecting, useful citizens."
1977		Fe Villanueva del Mundo (1911–2011)	Philippines	"for her lifelong dedication and pioneering spirit as a physician extraordinary to needy Filipino children."
1978		Prateep Ungsongtham Hata (b. 1952)	Thailand	"for bringing learning, better health and hope to impoverished children otherwise denied services in the portside slum of Klong Toey."
1979		Chang Kee-ryo (1911–1995)	South Korea	"for his practical, personal Christian charity in founding the Blue Cross Medical Cooperative in Pusan, giving the poor right to quality healthcare."
1980		Ohm Dae-sup (1921–2009)	South Korea	"for his abiding commitment toward making knowledge a tool for life-betterment in rural Korea."
1981		Johanna Sunarti Nasution (1923–2010)	Indonesia	"for her leadership of a volunteer movement, institutionalizing social services through cooperation by diverse civic and religious groups, schools and government agencies."
1982		Manibhai Desai (1920–1993)	India	"for his practical fulfillment of a vow made to Mahatma Gandhi 36 years ago to uplift, socially and economically, the poorest villagers."
1983		Fua Hariphitak (1910–1993)	Thailand	"for preserving and teaching a younger generation art forms that distinguish Thailand’s unique graphic and architectural heritage."
1984		Thongbai Thongpao (1926–2011)	Thailand	"for his effective and fair use of his legal skills and pen to defend those who have 'less in life and thus need more in law.'"
1985		Baba Amte (1914–2008)	India	"for his work-oriented rehabilitation of Indian leprosy patients and other handicapped outcasts."
1986		Abdul Sattar Edhi (1928–2016)	Pakistan	"for giving substance in an Islamic society to the ancient humane commandment that thou art thy brother's keeper."
1986		Bilquis Bano Edhi (1947–2022)	Pakistan	"for giving substance in an Islamic society to the ancient humane commandment that thou art thy brother's keeper."
1987		Hans Bague Jassin (1917–2000)	Indonesia	"for preserving for Indonesians their literary heritage."
1988		Masanobu Fukuoka (1913–2008)	Japan	"for his demonstration to small farmers everywhere that natural farming offers a practical, environmentally safe, and bountiful alternative to modern commercial practices and their harmful consequences."
1989		Lakshmi Chand Jain (1925–2010)	India	"for his informed and selfless commitment to attack India's poverty at the grass-roots level."
1991		Princess Maha Chakri Sirindhorn (b. 1955)	Thailand	"for making her royal office an instrument of enlightened endeavor for Thailand, and her sparkling embodiment of the best that is Thai."
1992		Angel Alcala (1929–2023)	Philippines	"for his pioneering scientific leadership in rehabilitating the coral reefs of the Philippines and in sustaining for Filipinos the natural abundance of their country's marine life."
1993		Banoo Jehangir Coyaji (1917–2004)	India	"for mobilizing the resources of a modern urban hospital to bring better health and brighter hopes to Maharashtra's rural women and their families."
1994		Mechai Viravaidya (b. 1941)	Thailand	"for his mounting creative public campaigns in Thailand to promote family planning, rural development and a rigorous, honest, and compassionate response to the plague of AIDS."
1995		Asma Jahangir (1952–2018)	Pakistan	"for challenging Pakistan to embrace and uphold the principles of religious tolerance, gender equality, and equal protection under the law."
1996		John Woong-Jin Oh, K.B.J. (b. 1944)	South Korea	"for arousing in Korea a compassion for the poor by personifying the scriptural injunction to Love Thy Neighbor."
1997		Mahesh Chander Mehta (b. 1946)	India	"for his claiming for India's present and future citizens their constitutional right to a clean and healthy environment."
1998		Sophon Suphapong (b. 1946)	Thailand	"for stimulating Thailand's rural economy by helping hundreds of rural cooperatives and community organizations own and operate their own businesses as affiliates of a major Thai oil company."
1999		Rosa Rosal (b. 1931)	Philippines	"for her lifetime of unstinting voluntary service, inspiring Filipinos to put the needs of others before their own."
2000		Liang Congjie (1932–2010)	China	"for his courageous pioneering leadership in China's environmental movement and nascent civil society."
2001		Wu Qing (b. 1937)	China	"for path-breaking advocacy on behalf of women and the rule of law in the People's Republic of China."
2002		Ruth Pfau, F.C.M. (1929–2017)	Pakistan	"for her lifelong dedication to eradicate leprosy and its stigma in Pakistan, and other loving gifts to her adopted country."
2003		Gao Yaojie (1927–2023)	China	"for her fervent personal crusade to confront the AIDS crisis in China and to address it humanely."
2004		Jiang Yanyong (1931–2023)	China	"for his brave stand for truth in China, spurring life-saving measures to confront and contain the deadly threat of SARS."
2005		Teten Masduki (b. 1963)	Indonesia	"for challenging Indonesians to expose corruption and claim their right to clean government."
2005		Viswanathan Shanta (1927–2021)	India	"for her leadership of Chennai's Cancer Institute (WIA) as a center of excellence and compassion for the study and treatment of cancer in India."
2006		Park Won-soon (1955–2020)	South Korea	"for his principled activism fostering social justice, fair business practices, clean government, and a generous spirit in South Korea's young democracy."
2007		Kim Sun-tae (b. ?)	South Korea	"for his inspiring ministry of hope and practical assistance to his fellow blind and visually impaired citizens in South Korea."
2008		Center for Agriculture and Rural Development Mutually Reinforcing Institutions (CARD MRI)	Philippines	"for its successful adaptation of microfinance to the Philippines, providing self-sustaining and comprehensive financial services for half a million poor women and their families."
2008		Therdchai Jivacate (b. 1941)	Thailand	"for his dedicated efforts in Thailand to provide inexpensive, practical, and comfortable artificial limbs to even the poorest amputees."

=== Community Leadership (1958–2008) ===
To recognize leadership of a community toward helping the disadvantaged have fuller opportunities and a better life.

Year	Image	Recipient	Nationality or Base Country	Citation
1958		Vinoba Bhave (1895–1982)	India	"for his furtherance of the cause of arousing his countrymen toward voluntary action in relieving social injustice and economic inequalities."
1959		Tenzin Gyatso, 14th Dalai Lama (b. 1935)	Tibet	"for his leadership of the Tibetan community's gallant struggle in defense of the sacred religion that is the inspiration of their life and culture."
1960		Tunku Abdul Rahman (1903–1990)	Malaysia	"for his guidance of a multiracial society through its constitutional struggle for independence, toward communal alliance and national identity."
1961		Gus Borgeest (1909–2013)	United Kingdom; Hong Kong	"for his establishing of a model for resettlement and rehabilitation of refugees that enhances their self-respect and productive capabilities."
1962		Palayil Narayanan (1923–1996)	Malaysia	"for their championship of the workers' cause through vigorous advancement of responsible and free trade unionism."
1962		Koesna Poeradiredja (1902–1976)	Indonesia	"for their championship of the workers' cause through vigorous advancement of responsible and free trade unionism."
1963		Verghese Kurien (1921–2012)	India	"for their creative coordination of government and private enterprise to improve the supply of an essential food and sanitation in one of Asia's largest and most crowded urban complexes and to raise living standards among village producers."
1963		Dara Nusserwanji Khurody (1906–1983)	India	"for their creative coordination of government and private enterprise to improve the supply of an essential food and sanitation in one of Asia's largest and most crowded urban complexes and to raise living standards among village producers."
1963		Tribhuvandas Kishibhai Patel (1903–1994)	India	"for their creative coordination of government and private enterprise to improve the supply of an essential food and sanitation in one of Asia's largest and most crowded urban complexes and to raise living standards among village producers."
1964		Pablo Torres Tapia (1908–1967)	Philippines	"for his steadfast determination in mobilizing the savings of his community to provide workable credit facilities for its productive needs."
1965		Lim Kim San (1916–2006)	Singapore	"for his marshalling of talents and resources to provide one-fifth of Singapore's burgeoning population with decent, moderately-priced housing amidst attractive surroundings."
1966		Kamaladevi Chattopadhyay (1903–1988)	India	"for her enduring creativity with handicrafts and cooperatives, as in politics, art and the theater."
1967		Abdul Razak Hussein (1922–1976)	Malaysia	"a politician administering with quiet, efficient and innovative urgency the reshaping of his society for the benefit of all."
1968		Silvino Encarnacion (1913–1990)	Philippines	"for their wise management of accredit cooperative that soundly improves life in their low-income barrio, without incurring bad debts."
1968		Rosario Encarnacion (1910–1989)	Philippines	"for their wise management of accredit cooperative that soundly improves life in their low-income barrio, without incurring bad debts."
1969		Ahangamage Tudor Ariyaratne (1931–2024)	Ceylon	"for his founding and inspired guidance of the Sarvodaya Shramadana Movement, combining voluntary service in meeting village needs with an awakening of man's potential when he cultivates his best instincts."
1970	Not awarded			
1971		M.S. Swaminathan (1925–2023)	India	"for his contributions as scientist, educator of both students and farmers, and administrator toward generating a new confidence in India’s agricultural capabilities."
1972		Hans Westenberg (1898–1990)	Netherlands; Indonesia	"for his practical propagation of new crops and promotion of better methods among Sumatra's small farmers who have learned to trust and profit from his ideas."
1973		Krasae Chanawongse (b. 1934)	Thailand	"for demonstrating that a doctor dedicated to service can overcome the most stubborn of obstacles in bringing effective health services to neglected and impoverished rural people."
1974		Fusaye Ichikawa (1893–1981)	Japan	"for her lifetime labors advancing with exemplary political integrity her countrywomen's public and personal freedom."
1975		Lee Tai-Young (1914–1998)	South Korea	"for her effective service to the cause of equal judicial rights for the liberation of Korean women."
1976		Toshikazu Wakatsuki (1910–2006)	Japan	"for bringing to his country's most depressed citizens the highest type of technically competent and humanely inspired health care, thus creating a model for rural medicine."
1977		Ela Ramesh Bhatt (1933–2022)	India	"for making a reality of the Gandhian principle of self-help among the depressed work of forced of self-employed women."
1978		Tahrunessa Abdullah (b. 1937)	Bangladesh	"for leading rural Bangladeshi Muslim women from the constraints of purdah toward more equal citizenship and fuller family responsibility."
1979		Rajanikant Arole (1934–2011)	India	"“for creating a self-sustaining rural health and economic betterment movement in one of the poorer regions of West-Central India."
1979		Mabelle Arole (b. 1935)	India	"“for creating a self-sustaining rural health and economic betterment movement in one of the poorer regions of West-Central India."
1980		Fazle Hasan Abed (1936–2019)	Bangladesh	"for his organizational skill in demonstrating that Bangladeshi solutions are valid for needs of the rural poor in his burdened country."
1981		Pramod Karan Sethi (1927–2008)	India	"for application of his surgical genius and his joining of doctors, craftsmen and community in a popular program enabling the crippled and limbless to resume near normal lives."
1982		Chandi Prasad Bhatt (b. 1934)	India	"for his inspiration and guidance of Chipko Andolan, a unique, predominantly women’s environmental movement, to safeguard wise use of the forest."
1983		Ir. Anton Soedjarwo (b. 1948)	Indonesia	"for stimulating Javanese villagers to genuine self-reliance with simple, readily applicable appropriate technology."
1984		Muhammad Yunus (b. 1940)	Bangladesh	"for enabling the neediest rural men and women to make themselves productive with sound group-managed credit."
1985		Zafrullah Chowdhury (1941–2023)	Bangladesh	"for his engineering of Bangladesh’s new drug policy, eliminating unnecessary pharmaceuticals, and making comprehensive medical care more available to ordinary citizens."
1986		John Vincent Daly, S.J. (1935–2014)	United States; South Korea	"for their education and guidance of the urban poor to create vigorous, humanly sound satellite communities."
1986		Paul Jeong Gu Jei (b. 1944)	South Korea	"for their education and guidance of the urban poor to create vigorous, humanly sound satellite communities."
1987		Aree Valyasevi (b. 1925)	Thailand	"for his contribution in improving the diets and promoting the good health of millions of Thai children."
1988		Mohammad Yeasin (1936–1999)	Bangladesh	"for moving rural Bangladeshis to self-reliance and economic security through an efficiently and honestly managed village cooperative."
1989		Kim Im-soon (b. ?)	South Korea	"for nurturing hundreds of abandoned and handicapped children to adulthood in an atmosphere of beauty and love."
1991		Shih Cheng Yen (b. 1937)	Taiwan	"for reawakening Taiwan’s modern people to the ancient Buddhist teachings of compassion and charity."
1992		Shoaib Sultan Khan (b. 1933)	Pakistan	"for nurturing self-reliant development and bringing hope to the forgotten peoples of high Pakistan."
1993		Abdurrahman Wahid (1940–2009)	Indonesia	"for guiding Southeast Asia’s largest Muslim organization as a force for religious tolerance, fair economic development, and democracy in Indonesia."
1994		Sima Samar (b. 1957)	Afghanistan	"for acting courageously to heal the sick and instruct the young among the Afghan refugee community in Pakistan and in her war-torn homeland."
1994		Fei Xiaotong (1910–2005)	China	"for giving Chinese substance to the modern social sciences and applying them rigorously to the needs of China and its people."
1995		Ho Ming-Teh (1922–1998)	Taiwan	"for improving rural Taiwan with good deeds and sturdy bridges."
1996		Pandurang Shastri Athavale (1920–2003)	India	"for tapping the ancient wellsprings of Hindu civilization to inspire spiritual renewal and social transformation in modern India."
1997		Eva Maamo (1940–2026)	Philippines	"for her compelling example in bringing humane assistance and healing arts to the poorest Filipinos."
1998		Nuon Phaly (1942–2012)	Cambodia	"for her selfless commitment to helping war-traumatized women and children rebuild their spirits and lives in the wake of Cambodia's great national tragedy."
1999		Angela Gomes (b. 1952)	Bangladesh	"for helping rural Bangladeshi women assert their rights to better livelihoods and to gender equality under the law and in everyday life."
2000		Aruna Roy (b. 1946)	India	"for empowering Indian villagers to claim what is rightfully theirs by upholding and exercising the people's right to information."
2001		Rajendra Singh (b. 1959)	India	"for leading Rajasthani villagers in the steps of their ancestors to rehabilitate their degraded habitat and bring its dormant river back to life."
2002		Cynthia Maung (b. 1959)	Myanmar	"for her humane and fearless response to the urgent medical needs of thousands of refugees and displaced persons along the Thailand-Burma border."
2003		Shantha Sinha (b. 1950)	India	"for guiding the people of Andhra Pradesh to end the scourge of child labor and send all of their children to school."
2004		Prayong Ronnarong (b. 1937)	Thailand	"for leading fellow farmers in demonstrating that the model of self-reliant local enterprises, supported by active community learning, is the path to rural prosperity in Thailand."
2005		Sombath Somphone (b. 1956)	Laos	"for his hopeful efforts to promote sustainable development in Laos by training and motivating its young people to become a generation of leaders."
2006		Gawad Kalinga Community Development Foundation	Philippines	"for harnessing the faith and generosity of Filipinos the world over to confront poverty in their homeland and to provide every Filipino the dignity of a decent home and neighborhood."
2006		Antonio Meloto (b. 1950)	Philippines	"for harnessing the faith and generosity of Filipinos the world over to confront poverty in their homeland and to provide every Filipino the dignity of a decent home and neighborhood."
2007		Mahabir Pun (1955)	Nepal	"for his innovative application of wireless computer technology in Nepal, bringing progress to remote mountain areas by connecting his village to the global village."
2008		Prakash Amte (b. 1948)	India	"for enhancing the capacity of the Madia Gonds to adapt positively in today's India, through healing and teaching and other compassionate interventions."
2008		Mandakini Amte (b. 1950)	India	"for enhancing the capacity of the Madia Gonds to adapt positively in today's India, through healing and teaching and other compassionate interventions."

=== Journalism, Literature, and the Creative Communication Arts (1958–2008) ===
To recognize effective writing, publishing, or photography or the use of radio, television, cinema, or the performing arts as a power for the public good.

Year	Image	Recipient	Nationality or base country	Citation
1958		Robert McCulloch Dick (1873–1960)	United Kingdom; Philippines	"for the courageous and constructive contribution each has made in the profession of journalism as a power for the public good."
1958		Mochtar Lubis (1922–2004)	Indonesia	"for the courageous and constructive contribution each has made in the profession of journalism as a power for the public good."
1959		Tarzie Vittachi (1921–1993)	Ceylon	"for their defense of civil rights and press freedom and their able stewardship of the power of the press which they have discharged with a sense of responsibility in keeping with the highest traditions of journalism."
1959		Edward Michael Law-Yone (1911–1980)	Burma	"for their defense of civil rights and press freedom and their able stewardship of the power of the press which they have discharged with a sense of responsibility in keeping with the highest traditions of journalism."
1960	Not awarded			
1961		Amitabha Chowdhury (1927–2015)	India	"for his scrupulous and probing investigative reporting in protection of individual rights and community interests."
1962		Chang Chun-ha (1918–1975)	South Korea	"for his editorial integrity in publication of a nonpartisan forum to encourage dynamic participation by intellectuals in national reconstruction."
1963	Not awarded			
1964		Richard Wilson (b. ?)	United Kingdom; Hong Kong	"for their accuracy, impartiality and continuing research for facts and insights in recording Asia’s quest for economic advancement."
1964		Kayser Sung (1919–2010)	China; Hong Kong	"for their accuracy, impartiality and continuing research for facts and insights in recording Asia’s quest for economic advancement."
1965		Akira Kurosawa (1910–1998)	Japan	"for his perceptive use of the film to probe the moral dilemma of man amidst the tumultuous remaking of his values and environment in the mid-20th century."
1967		Satyajit Ray (1921–1992)	India	"for his uncompromising use of the film as an art, drawing themes from his native Bengali literature to depict a true image of India."
1968		Tôn Thất Thiện (1924–2014)	Vietnam	"for his enduring commitment to free inquiry and debate."
1969		Mitoji Nishimoto (1899–1988)	Japan	"for his 44 years of discerning design of Japan’s superior educational radio and television broadcasting system."
1970	Not awarded			
1971		Prayoon Chanyavongs (1915–1992)	Thailand	"for his use of pictorial satire and humor for over three decades in unswerving defense of the public interest."
1972		Yasuji Hanamori (1911–1978)	Japan	"for his cogent advocacy of the interests, rights and well-being of the Japanese consumer, especially the hard-pressed housewife."
1973		Michiko Ishimure (1927–2018)	Japan	"as the 'voice of her people' in their struggle against the industrial pollution that has been distorting and destroying their lives."
1974		Zacarias Sarian (1937–2020)	Philippines	"for his standards of editing and publishing interesting, accurate and constructive farm news."
1975		Boobli George Verghese (1927–2014)	India	"for his superior developmental reporting of Indian society, balancing factual accounts of achievements, shortcomings and carefully-researched alternatives."
1976		Sombhu Mitra (1915–1997)	India	"for creating a relevant theater movement in India by superb production, acting and writing."
1977		Mahesh Chandra Regmi (1929–2003)	Nepal	"for his chronicling of Nepal's past and present, enabling his people to discover their origins and delineating national options.
1978		Yoon Suk-joong (1911–2003)	South Korea	"for his more than 1,000 poems and songs that over 40 years have fostered joyful, positive values among Korean children."
1979		L. T. P. Manjusri (1902–1982)	Sri Lanka	"for his preserving for the people of Sri Lanka and the world the 2,000-year-old tradition of classical art found in their great Buddhist temples."
1980		F. Sionil José (1924–2022)	Philippines	"for his intellectual courage and his concern for and encouragement of Asian and other writers and artists, for many of whom his Solidaridad Book Shop is a cultural mecca."
1981		Gour Kishore Ghosh (1923–2000)	India	"for his sagacious courage and ardent humanism in defense of individual and press freedom amidst pressures and threats from left and right."
1982		Arun Shourie (b. 1941)	India	"a concerned citizen employing his pen as an effective adversary of corruption, inequality and injustice."
1983		Marcelline Jayakody (1902–1998)	Sri Lanka	"for enriching his country's 'world of song and music' with spiritual and human rejoicing."
1984		Rasipuram Krishnaswami Laxman (1921–2015)	India	"for his incisive, witty, never malicious cartoons illuminating India's political and social issues."
1985		Lino Brocka (1939–1991)	Philippines	"for making cinema a vital social commentary, awakening public consciousness to disturbing realities of life among the Filipino poor."
1986		Radio Veritas	Philippines	"for its crucial role in using truth to depose an oppressive and corrupt regime and restore Filipino faith in the electoral process."
1987		Diane Ying Yun-peng (b. 1941)	Taiwan	"for her contribution of economic reporting and business journalism to Taiwan's industrial and commercial vitality."
1988		Ediriweera Sarachchandra (1914–1996)	Sri Lanka	"for creating modern theater from traditional Sinhalese folk dramas and awakening Sri Lankans to their rich cultural and spiritual heritage."
1989		James Reuter, S.J. (1916–2012)	Philippines	"for employing his gifts as writer, theatrical director, and broadcaster, but most of all as teacher, to make the performing arts and mass media a vital force for good in the Philippines."
1990	Not awarded			
1991		Kuntagodu Vibhuthi Subbanna (1932–2005)	India	"for enriching rural Karnataka with the world's best films and the delight and wonder of the living stage."
1992		Ravi Shankar (1920–2012)	India	"for enriching India and the world with his sublime mastery of the sitar and with music 'that colors the mind.'"
1993		Bienvenido Lumbera (1932–2021)	Philippines	"for asserting the central place of the vernacular tradition in framing a national identity for modern Filipinos."
1994		Abdul Samad Ismail (1924–2008)	Malaysia	"for applying his intellect and journalistic skills to champion national independence, cultural revival, and democratic nation-building in Malaysia."
1995		Pramoedya Ananta Toer (1925–2006)	Indonesia	"for illuminating with brilliant stories the historical awakening and modern experience of the Indonesian people."
1996		Nick Joaquin (1917–2004)	Philippines	"for exploring the mysteries of the Filipino body and soul in sixty inspired years as a writer."
1997		Mahasweta Devi (1926–2016)	India	"for her compassionate crusade through art and activism to claim for tribal peoples a just and honorable place in India's national life."
1998		Ruocheng Ying (1929–2003)	China	"for enhancing China’s cultural dialogue with the world-at-large and with its own rich heritage through a brilliant and preserving life in the theater."
1999		Raul Locsin (1923–2003)	Philippines	"for his enlightened commitment to the principle that, above all, a newspaper is a public trust."
1999		Lin Hwai-min (b. 1947)	Taiwan	"for revitalizing the theatrical arts in Taiwan with modern dance that is at once eloquently universal and authentically Chinese."
2000		Atmakusumah Astraatmadja (1938–2025)	Indonesia	"for his formative role in laying the institutional and profession foundations for a new era of press freedom in Indonesia."
2001		Wannakuwattawaduge Amaradeva (1927–2016)	Sri Lanka	"for his life of dazzling creativity in expression of the rich heritage and protean vitality of Sri Lankan music."
2002		Bharat Koirala (b. 1942)	Nepal	"for developing professional journalism in Nepal and unleashing the democratizing powers of a free media."
2003		Sheila Coronel (b. ?)	Philippines	"for leading a groundbreaking collaborative effort to develop investigative journalism as a critical component of democratic discourse in the Philippines."
2004		Abdullah Abu Sayeed (b. 1939)	Bangladesh	"for cultivating in the youth of Bangladesh a love for books and their humanizing values through exposure to the great works of Bengal and the world."
2005		Matiur Rahman (b. 1946)	Bangladesh	"for wielding the power of the press to crusade against acid throwing and to stir Bangladeshis to help its many victims."
2006		Eugenia Duran Apostol (b. 1925)	Philippines	"for her courageous example in placing the truth-telling press at the center of the struggle for democratic rights and better government in the Philippines."
2007		Palagummi Sainath (b. 1957)	India	"for his passionate commitment as a journalist to restore the rural poor to India's consciousness, moving the nation to action."
2008		Akio Ishii (b. 1955)	Japan	"for his principled career as a publisher, placing discrimination, human rights, and other difficult subjects squarely in Japan’s public discourse."

=== Peace and International Understanding (1958–2008) ===
To recognize contributions to the advancement of friendship, tolerance, peace, and solidarity as the foundations for sustainable development within and across countries.

Year	Image	Recipient	Nationality or Base Country	Citation
1958		Operation Brotherhood	Philippines	"in acknowledgement of the spirit of service to other peoples in a time of need, with which it was conceived and has been carried forward, as well as the international amity it has fostered."
1959	Not awarded			
1960		Y.C. James Yen (c. 1890–1990)	Taiwan	"for his continuing concern for the whole man and molding his social institutions, rather than simply refashioning the physical environment."
1961		Genevieve Caulfield (1888–1972)	United States; Thailand	"for her international citizenship and guidance to full and useful lives of those in other lands afflicted like herself."
1962		Mother Teresa, M.C. (1910–1997)	Albania; India	"for her merciful cognizance of the abject poor of a foreign land, in whose service she has led a new congregation."
1963		Peace Corps in Asia	United States	"in recognition of the Peace Corps Volunteers serving in the Near East, Africa and Latin America."
1964		Welthy Honsinger Fisher (1879–1980)	United States; India	"for her unstinting personal commitment to the cause of literacy in India and other Asian countries whose teachers have sought her guidance."
1965		Bayanihan Folk Arts Center	Philippines	"for their projection of a warm and artistic portrayal of the Filipino people to audiences on five continents."
1966		Committee for Coordination of Investigations of the Lower Mekong Basin and Cooperating Entities	Cambodia	"for its purposeful progress toward harnessing one of Asia's greatest river systems, setting aside divisive national interests in deference to regional opportunities."
1967		Shiroshi Nasu (1888–1984)	Japan	"for his practical humanitarianism, enhancing cooperation in agriculture by learning through multinational experience."
1968		Cooperative for American Relief Everywhere (CARE)	United States; Philippines	"for its constructive humanitarianism, fostering dignity among the needy in Asia and on three other continents for over 22 years."
1969		International Rice Research Institute (IRRI)	Philippines	"for its seven years of innovative, interdisciplinary teamwork by Asian and Western scientists, unprecedented in scope, that is achieving radical, rapid advances in rice culture."
1970	Not awarded			
1971		Saburō Ōkita (1914–1993)	Japan	"for his sustained and forceful advocacy of genuine Japanese partnership in the economic progress of her Asian neighbors."
1972	Not awarded			
1973		Summer Institute of Linguistics	United States; Philippines	"for its inspired outreach to non-literate tribespeople, recording and teaching them to read their own languages and enhancing their participation in the larger community of man."
1974		William Masterson, S.J. (1910–1984)	United States; Philippines	"for his multinational education and inspiration of rural leaders prompting their return to and love of the land."
1975		Patrick James McGlinchey, S.S.C.M.E. (1928–2018)	Ireland; South Korea	"for mobilizing international support and foreign volunteers to modernize livestock farming in his adopted country."
1976		Henning Holck-Larsen (1907–2003)	Denmark; India	"for his signal contribution towards India's technical modernization, complementing industrialization with human concern."
1977		College of Agriculture, University of the Philippines at Los Baños (UPLB)	Philippines	"for its quality of teaching and research, fostering a sharing of knowledge in modernizing Southeast Asian agriculture."
1978		Soedjatmoko Mangoendiningrat (1922–1989)	Indonesia	"for his persuasive presentation of the case for developing Asia's basic needs in the councils of world decision making."
1979		Association of Southeast Asian Nations (ASEAN)	Indonesia	"for its supplanting national jealousies that led to confrontation, with increasingly effective cooperation, goodwill among the neighboring peoples of Southeast Asia."
1980		Shigeharu Matsumoto (1899–1989)	Japan	"for building constructive relations between Japanese and others through shared knowledge of their diverse histories, needs and national aspirations."
1981		Augustine Joung Kang (1923–2019)	South Korea	"for his practical democracy and use of regional cooperation to foster economically and humanly sound credit unions."
1982	Not awarded			
1983		Aloysius Schwartz (1930–1992)	United States; South Korea	"for mobilizing European and American support to succor acutely deprived Korean youngsters, homeless elderly and infirm."
1984		Jiro Kawakita (1920–2009)	Japan	"for winning the participating of remote Nepalese villagers in researching their problems, resulting in practical benefits of potable water supplies and rapid ropeway transport across mountain gorges."
1985		Harold Ray Watson (b. 1934)	United States; Philippines	"for encouraging international utilization of the Sloping Agricultural Lang Technology created by him and his coworkers to help the poorest of small tropical farmers."
1986		International Institute of Rural Reconstruction (IIRR)	Philippines	"for its training of agrarian development workers from four continents, enabling them to share experience and ideas for more effective progress."
1987		Richard William Timm, C.S.C. (1923–2020)	United States; Bangladesh	"for his 35 years of sustained commitment of mind and heart to helping Bangladeshis build their national life."
1988		The Royal Project	Thailand	"for its concerted national and international effort to curtail opium growing by bringing worthy livelihoods to Thailand’s hill tribes."
1989		Asian Institute of Technology (AIT)	Thailand	"for shaping a new generation of engineers and managers committed to Asia in an atmosphere of academic excellence and regional camaraderie."
1990	Not awarded			
1991		Press Foundation of Asia	Philippines	"for guiding Asia's press to look beyond national borders and speak intelligently to complex issues of regional change and development.
1992		Washington SyCip (1921–2017)	Philippines	"for fostering economic growth and mutual understanding in Asia through professionalism, public-spirited enterprise, and his own esteemed example."
1993		Noboru Iwamura (1927–2005)	Japan	"for heeding the call of the true physician in a lifetime of service to Japan's Asia neighbors."
1994		Eduardo Jorge Anzorena (b. 1932)	Argentina; Japan	"for fostering a collaborative search for humane and practical solutions to the housing crisis among Asia’s urban poor."
1995		Asian Institute of Management (AIM)	Philippines	"for setting regionwide standards for excellence and relevance in training Asians to manage Asia's business and development."
1996		Toshihiro Takami (1925–2019)	Japan	"for enlisting community leaders from fifty countries in the common cause of secure, sustainable, and equitable livelihoods for the world's rural people."
1997		Sadako Ogata (1927–2019)	Japan	"for invoking the moral authority of the United Nations High Commissioner for Refugees to insist that behind the right of every refugee to asylum lies the greater right of every person to remain at home in peace."
1998		Corazon Aquino (1933–2009)	Philippines	"for giving radiant moral force to the nonviolent movement for democracy in the Philippines and in the world."
1999	Not awarded			
2000		Jockin Arputham (1947–2018)	India	"for extending the lessons of community building in India to Southeast Asia and Africa and helping the urban poor of two continents improve their lives by learning from one another."
2001		Ikuo Hirayama (1930–2009)	Japan	"for his efforts to promote peace and international cooperation by fostering a common bond of stewardship for the world's cultural treasures."
2002		Pomnyun Sunim (b. 1953)	South Korea	"for his compassionate attention to the human cost of Korea's bitter division and his hopeful appeal for reconciliation."
2003		Tetsu Nakamura (1946–2019)	Japan	"for his passionate commitment to ease the pain of war, disease, and calamity among refugees and the mountain poor of the Afghanistan-Pakistan borderlands."
2003		Seiei Toyama (1906–2004)	Japan	"for his twenty-year crusade to green the deserts of China in a spirit of solidarity and peace."
2004		Laxminarayan Ramdas (1933–2024)	India	"for reaching across a hostile border to nurture a citizen-based consensus for peace between Pakistan and India."
2004		Ibn Abdur Rehman (1930–2021)	Pakistan	"for reaching across a hostile border to nurture a citizen-based consensus for peace between Pakistan and India."
2006		Sanduk Ruit (b. 1954)	Nepal	"for placing Nepal at the forefront of developing safe, effective, and economical procedures for cataract surgery, enabling the needlessly blind in even poorest countries to see again."
2007		Tang Xiyang (1930–2022)	China	"for guiding China to meet its mounting environmental crisis by heeding the lessons of its global neighbors and the timeless wisdom of nature itself."
2008		Ahmad Syafi'i Maarif (1935–2022)	Indonesia	"for guiding Muslims to embrace tolerance and pluralism as the basis for justice and harmony in Indonesia and in the world at large."

=== Emergent Leadership (2001–present) ===
To recognize an individual, forty years of age or younger, for outstanding work on issues of social change in his or her community, but whose leadership may not yet be broadly recognized outside of this community.

Year	Image	Recipient	Nationality or Base Country	Citation
2001		Oung Chanthol (b. 1967)	Cambodia	"for her resolute activism on behalf of working people and their place in Indonesia’s evolving democracy."
2001		Dita Indah Sari (b. 1972)	Indonesia	"for rising courageously to confront and eliminate sex trafficking and gender violence in Cambodia."
2002		Sandeep Pandey (b. 1965)	India	"for the empowering example of his commitment to the transformation of India's marginalized poor."
2003		Aniceto Guterres Lopes (b. 1967)	Timor Leste	"for his courageous stand for justice and the rule of law during East Timor’s turbulent passage to nationhood."
2004		Benjamin Abadiano (b. 1963)	Philippines	"for his steadfast commitment to indigenous Filipinos and their hopes for peace and better lives consonant with their hallowed ways of life."
2005		Hye-Ran Yoon (b. 1969)	South Korea	"for her catalytic role in enabling Cheonan's civil society to exercise its social responsibilities dynamically and democratically."
2006		Arvind Kejriwal (b. 1968)	India	"for activating India's right-to-information movement at the grassroots, empowering New Delhi's poorest citizens to fight corruption by holding government answerable to the people."
2007		Chen Guangcheng (b. 1971)	China	"for his irrepressible passion for justice in leading ordinary Chinese citizens to assert their legitimate rights under the law."
2007		Chung To (b. ?)	United States; Hong Kong	"for his proactive and compassionate response to AIDS in China and to the needs of its most vulnerable victims."
2008		Ananda Galappatti (b. ?)	Sri Lanka	"for his spirited personal commitment to bring appropriate and effective psychosocial services to survivors of war and natural disasters in Sri Lanka."
2009		Ka Hsaw Wa (b. 1970)	Myanmar	"for dauntlessly pursuing nonviolent yet effective channels of redness, exposure, and education for the defense of human rights, the environment, and democracy in Burma."
2010	Not awarded			
2011		Nileema Mishra (b. 1972)	India	"for her purpose-drive zeal to work tirelessly with villagers in Maharashta, India, organizing them to successfully address both their aspirations and their adversities through collective action and heightened confidence in their potential to improve their own lives."
2012		Ambrosius Ruwindrijarto (b. ?)	Indonesia	"for his sustained advocacy for community-based natural resource management in Indonesia, leading bold campaigns to stop illegal forest exploitation, as well as fresh social enterprise initiatives that engage the forest communities as their full partners."
2013	Not awarded			
2014		Randy Halasan (b. 1982)	Philippines	"for his purposeful dedication in nurturing his Matigsalug students and their community to transform their lives through quality education and sustainable livelihoods, doing so in ways that respect their uniqueness and preserve their integrity as indigenous peoples in modernizing Philippines."
2015		Sanjiv Chaturvedi (b. 1974)	India	"for his exemplary integrity, courage and tenacity in uncompromisingly exposing and painstakingly investigating corruption in public office, and his resolute crafting of program and system improvements to ensure that government honorably serves the people of India."
2016		Thodur Madabusi Krishna (b. 1976)	India	"for his forceful commitment as artist and advocate to art’s power to heal India's deep social divisions, breaking barriers of caste and class to unleash what music has to offer not just for some but for all."
2017	Not awarded			
2018	Not awarded			
2019		Ko Swe Win (b. 1978)	Myanmar	"for his undaunted commitment to practice independent, ethical, and socially engaged journalism in Myanmar, for his incorruptible sense of justice and unflinching pursuit of the truth in crucial but underreported issues, and his resolute insistence that it is in the quality and force of media's truth-telling that we can convincingly protect human rights in the world."
2020	Not awarded due to COVID-19 pandemic			
2021	Not awarded			
2022		Gary Bencheghib (b. ?)	France; Indonesia	"for his inspiring fight against marine plastic pollution, an issue at once intensely local as well as global; his youthful energies in combining nature, adventure, video, and technology as weapons for social advocacy; and his creative, risk-taking passion that is truly a shining example for the youth and the world."
2023		Korvi Rakshand (b. 1985)	Bangladesh	"for his courage, vision and dedication to education and social change. He founded the JAAGO Foundation in 2007, which provides free, quality and government-recognized English-language education to over 30,000 underprivileged students across Bangladesh. He also inspired thousands of young people to join his cause of social transformation."'
2024		Farwiza Farhan (b. 1986)	Indonesia	"for her profound understanding of the vital connection between nature and humanity, her commitment to social justice and responsible citizenship through her work with forest communities, and her promotion of greater awareness of the need to protect the beating heart and lungs of her country's and Asia's rich but endangered natural resources."

=== Uncategorized (2009–present) ===
Year	Image	Recipient	Nationality or Base Country	Citation
2009		Deep Joshi (b. 1947)	India	"for his vision and leadership in bringing professionalism to the NGO movement in India by effectively combining 'head' and 'heart' in the transformative work of rural development."
2009		Krisana Kraisintu (b. 1957)	Thailand	"for placing pharmaceutical rigor at the service of patients through her untiring and fearless dedication to producing much-needed generic drugs in Thailand and elsewhere in the world."
2009		Ma Jun (b. 1968)	China	"for harnessing the technology and power of information to address China's water crisis, and mobilizing pragmatic, multisectoral and collaborative efforts to ensure sustainable benefits for China's environment and society."
2009		Antonio Oposa Jr. (1924–2015)	Philippines	"for his path-breaking and passionate crusade to engage Filipinos in acts of enlightened citizenship that maximize the power of law to protect and nurture the environment for themselves, their children, and generations still to come."
2009		Yu Xiaogang (b. 1950)	China	"for fusing social science knowledge with a deep sense of social justice, in assisting dam-affected communities in China to shape the development projects that impact their natural environment and their lives."
2010		Tadatoshi Akiba (b. 1942)	Japan	"for his principled and determined leadership in a sustained global campaign to mobilize citizens, pressure governments, and build the political will to create a world free from the perils of nuclear war."
2010		Fu Qiping (b. 1969)	China	"for his enterprising leadership and undeniable success in demonstrating how village-level economic development can be achieved without damage to the environment."
2010		Huo Daishan (b. 1953)	China	"for his selfless and unrelenting efforts, despite formidable odds, to save China's great river Huai and the numerous communities who draw life from it."
2010		A.H.M. Noman Khan (b. ?)	Bangladesh	"for his pioneering leadership in mainstreaming persons with disabilities in the development process of Bangladesh, and in working vigorously with all sectors to build a society that is truly inclusive and barrier-free."
2010		Pan Yue (b. 1960)	China	"for his bold pursuit of a national environmental program, insisting on state and private accountability, encouraging state-citizen dialogue, and raising the environment as an issue of urgent national concern."
2010		Christopher Bernido (b. 1956)	Philippines	"for their purposeful commitment to both science and nation, ensuring innovative, low-cost, and effective basic education even under Philippine conditions of great scarcity and daunting poverty."
2010		Maria Victoria Carpio-Bernido (1961–2022)	Philippines	"for their purposeful commitment to both science and nation, ensuring innovative, low-cost, and effective basic education even under Philippine conditions of great scarcity and daunting poverty."
2011		Alternative Indigenous Development Foundation, Inc. (AIDFI)	Philippines	"for their collective vision, technological innovations, and partnership practices to make appropriate technologies improve the lives and livelihoods of the rural poor in upland Philippine communities and elsewhere in Asia."
2011		Harish Hande (b. 1967)	India	"for his passionate and pragmatic efforts to put solar power technology in the hands of the poor, through a social enterprise that brings customized, affordable, and sustainable electricity to India’s vast rural populace, encouraging the poor to become asset creators."
2011		Hasanain Juaini (b. 1964)	Indonesia	"for his holistic, community-based approach to pesantren education in Indonesia, creatively promoting values of gender equality, religious harmony, environmental preservation, individual achievement, and civic engagement among young students and their communities."
2011		Koul Panha (b. ?)	Cambodia	"for his determined and courageous leadership of the sustained campaign to build an enlightened, organized and vigilant citizenry who will ensure fair and free elections – as well as demand accountable governance by their elected officials – in Cambodia's nascent democracy."
2011		Tri Mumpuni (b. 1964)	Indonesia	"for her determined and collaborative efforts to promote micro hydropower technology, catalyze needed policy changes, and ensure full community participation, in bringing electricity and the fruits of development to the rural areas of Indonesia."
2012		Chen Shu-chu (b. 1951)	Taiwan	"for the pure altruism of her giving, which reflects a deep, consistent, quiet compassion, and has transformed the lives of the numerous Taiwanese she has unselfishly helped."
2012		Francis Kulandei (b. 1946)	India	"for his visionary zeal, profound faith in community energies and sustained programs in pursuing the holistic economic empowerment of thousands of women and their families in rural India."
2012		Syeda Rizwana Hasan (b. 1968)	Bangladesh	"for her uncompromising courage and impassioned leadership in a campaign of judicial activism in Bangladesh that affirms the people s right to a good environment as nothing less than their right to dignity and life."
2012		Yang Saing Koma (b. ?)	Cambodia	"for his creative fusion of practical science and collective will that has inspired and enabled vast numbers of farmers in Cambodia to become more empowered and productive contributors to their country's economic growth."
2012		Romulo Davide (b. 1934)	Philippines	"for his steadfast passion in placing the power of discipline of science in the hands of Filipino farmers, who have consequently multiplied their yields, created productive farming communities, and rediscovered the dignity of their labor."
2013		Ernesto Domingo (b. 1930)	Philippines	"for his exemplary embrace of the social mission of his medical science and profession; his steadfast leadership in pursuing 'health for all' as a shared moral responsibility of all sectors; and his groundbreaking and successful advocacy for neonatal hepatitis vaccination, thereby saving millions of lives in the Philippines."
2013		Komisi Pemberantasan Korupsi (Corruption Eradication Commission)	Indonesia	"for its fiercely independent and successful campaign against corruption in Indonesia, combining the uncompromising prosecution of erring powerful officials with farsighted reforms in governance systems, and the educative promotion of vigilance, honesty and active citizenship among all Indonesians."
2013		Lahpai Seng Raw (b. 1949)	Myanmar	"for her quietly inspiring and inclusive leadership – in the midst of deep ethnic divides and prolonged armed conflict – to regenerate and empower damaged communities and to strengthen local NGOs in promoting a non-violent culture of participation and dialogue as the foundation for Myanmar's peaceful future."
2013		Shakti Samuha	Nepal	"for transforming their lives in service to other human trafficking survivors; for their passionate dedication towards rooting out a pernicious social evil in Nepal; and for the radiant example they have shown the world in reclaiming the human dignity that is the birthright of all abused women and children everywhere."
2014		Hu Shuli (b. 1953)	China	"for her unrelenting commitment to truthful, relevant, and unassailable journalism; her fearless promotion of transparency and accountability in business and public governance; and her leadership in blazing the way for more profession and independent-minded media practices in China."
2014		Saur Marlina Manurung (b. 1972)	Indonesia	"for her ennobling passion to protect and improve the lives of Indonesia's forest people; and her energizing leadership of volunteers in SOKOLA's customized education program that is sensitive to the lifeways of indigenous communities and the unique development challenges they face."
2014		Omara Khan Massoudi (b. 1948)	Afghanistan	"for his courage, labor, and leadership in protecting Afghan cultural heritage, rebuilding an institution vital for Afghanistan's future; and remind his countrymen and peoples everywhere that in recognizing humanity's shared patrimony, we can be inspired to stand together in peace."
2014		The Citizens Foundation	Pakistan	"for the social vision and high-level professionalism of its founders and those who run its schools in successfully pursuing their conviction that, with sustained civil responsiveness, quality education made available to all – irrespective of religion, gender, or economic status – is the key to Pakistan's brighter future."
2014		Wang Canfa (b. 1958)	China	"for his discerning and forceful leadership – through scholarly work, disciplined advocacy, and pro bono public interest litigation – in ensuring that the enlightened and competent practice of environmental law in China effectively protects the rights and lives of victims of environmental abuse, especially the poor and the powerless."
2015		Kommaly Chanthavong (b. 1950)	Laos	"for her fearless, indomitable spirit to revive and develop the ancient Laotian art of silk weaving, creating livelihoods for thousands of poor, war-displaced Laotians, and thus preserving the dignity of women and her nation's priceless silken cultural treasure."
2015		Ligaya Fernando-Amilbangsa (b. 1943)	Philippines	"for her single-minded crusade in preserving the endangered artistic heritage of southern Philippines, and in creatively propagating a dance form that celebrates and deepens the sense of shared cultural identity among Asians."
2015		Anshu Gupta (b. 1970)	India	"for his creative vision in transforming the culture of giving in India; his enterprising leadership in treating cloth as a sustainable development resource for the poor; and in reminding the world that true giving always respects and preserves human dignity."
2015		Kyaw Thu (b. 1959)	Myanmar	"for his generous compassion in addressing the fundamental needs of both the living and the dead in Myanmar – regardless of their class or religion – and his channeling personal fame and privilege to mobilize many others toward serving the greater social good."
2016		Japan Overseas Cooperation Volunteers	Japan	"for their idealism and spirit of service in advancing the lives of communities other than their own, demonstrating over five decades that it is indeed when people live, work, and think together that they lay the true foundation for peace and international solidarity."
2016		Bezwada Wilson (b. 1966)	India	"for his moral energy and prodigious skill in leading a grassroots movement to eradicate the degrading servitude of manual scavenging in India, reclaiming for the dalits the human dignity that is their natural birthright."
2016		Dompet Dhuafa	Indonesia	"for redefining the landscape of zakat-based philanthropy in Indonesia, unleashing the potential of the Islamic faith to uplift, irrespective of their creed, the lives of millions."
2016		Conchita Carpio Morales (b. 1941)	Philippines	"for her moral courage and commitment to justice in taking head-on one of the most intractable problems in the Philippines; and promoting by her example of incorruptibility, diligence, vision and leadership, the highest ethical standards in public service."
2016		Vientiane Rescue	Laos	"for its heroic work in saving Laotian lives in a time and place of great need, under the most deprived of circumstances, inspiring by their passionate humanitarianism a similar generosity of spirit in many others."
2017		Gethsie Shanmugam (b. 1934)	Sri Lanka	"for her compassion and courage in working under extreme conditions to rebuild war-scarred lives; her tireless efforts over four decades in building Sri Lanka's capacity for psychosocial support; and her deep inspiring humanity in caring for women and children, war's most vulnerable victims."
2017		Yoshiaki Ishizawa (b. 1937)	Japan	"for his selfless, steadfast service to the Cambodian people; his inspiring leadership in empowering Cambodians to be proud stewards of their heritage; and his wisdom in reminding us all that cultural monuments like the Angkor Wat are shared treasures whose preservation is thus, also our shared global responsibility."
2017		Lilia Bagaporo de Lima (b. 1960)	Philippines	"for her unstinting, sustained leadership in building a credible and efficient Philippine Economic Zone Authority (PEZA), proving that the honest, competent and dedicated work of public servants can, indeed, redound to real economic benefits to millions of Filipinos."
2017		Abdon Nababan (b. ?)	Indonesia	"for his brave, self-sacrificing advocacy to give voice and face to his country's IP communities; his principled, relentless yet pragmatic leadership of the world’s largest IP rights movement; and the far-reaching impact of his work on the lives of millions of Indonesians."
2017		Tony Tay (b. 1947)	Singapore	"for his quiet, abiding dedication to a simple act of kindness – sharing food with others – and his inspiring influence in enlarging this simple kindness into a collective, inclusive, vibrant volunteer movement that is nurturing the lives of many in Singapore."
2017		Philippine Educational Theater Association	Philippines	"for its bold, collective contributions in shaping the theater arts as a force for social change; its impassioned, unwavering work in empowering communities in the Philippines; and the shining example it has set as one of the leading organizations of its kind in Asia."
2018		Youk Chhang (b. 1961)	Cambodia	"for his great, unstinting labor in preserving the memory of the Cambodian genocide, and his leadership and vision in transforming the memory of horror into a process of attaining and preserving justice in his nation and the world."
2018		Maria de Lourdes Martins Cruz (b. 1962)	Timor Leste	"for her pure humanitarianism in uplifting Timor Leste's poor; her courageous pursuit of social justice and peace; and her nurturing the development of autonomous, self-reliant, caring citizens, so vital in new, post-conflict nations in the world."
2018		Howard Dee (b. 1930)	Philippines	"for his quietly heroic half-century of service to the Filipino people; his abiding dedication to the pursuit of social justice and peace in achieving dignity and progress for the poor; and his being, by hid deeds, a true servant of his faith and an exemplary citizen of his nation."
2018		Bharat Vatwani (b. 1958)	India	"for his tremendous courage and healing compassion in embracing India's mentally-afflicted destitute, and his steadfast and magnanimous dedication to the work of restoring and affirming the human dignity of even the most ostracized in our midst."
2018		Võ Thị Hoàng Yến (b. 1966)	Vietnam	"for her dauntless spirit and prodigious energy in rising above her condition; her creative, charismatic leadership in the sustained campaign to break down physical and mental barriers that have marginalized PWDs in Vietnam; and for being a shining, inspirational model for the young in her country and elsewhere in the world."
2018		Sonam Wangchuk (b. 1966)	India	"for his uniquely systematic, collaborative and community-driven reform of learning systems in remote northern India, thus improving the life opportunities of Ladakhi youth, and his constructive engagement of all sectors in local society to harness sciences and culture creatively for economic progress, thus setting an example for minority peoples in the world."
2019		Raymundo Pujante Cayabyab (b. 1954)	Philippines	"for his compositions and performances that have defined and inspired Filipino popular music across generations; his indomitable, undeterred confidence to selflessly seek, mentor and promote young Filipino musical genius for the global stage; and his showing us all that music can indeed instill pride and joy, and unify people across the many barriers that divide them."
2019		Kim Jong-ki (b. 1947)	South Korea	"for his quiet courage in transforming private grief into the mission to protect Korea's youth from the scourge of bullying and violence; his unstinting dedication to the goal of instilling among the young the values of self-esteem, tolerance, and mutual respect; and his effectively mobilizing all sectors of the country in a nationwide driver that has transformed both policy and behaviors towards building a gentler, non-violent society."
2019		Ravish Kumar (b. 1974)	India	"for his unfaltering commitment to a professional, ethical journalism of the highest standards; his moral courage in standing up for truth, integrity, and independence; and his principled belief that it is in giving full and respectful voice to the voiceless, in speaking truth bravely yet soberly to power, that journalism fulfills its noblest aims to advance democracy."
2019		Angkhana Neelaphaijit (b. 1956)	Thailand	"for her unwavering courage in seeking justice for her husband and many other victims of violence and conflict in southern Thailand; her systematic, unflagging work to reform a flawed and unfair legal system, and the shining proof she is that the humblest ordinary person can achieve national impact in deterring human rights abuses."
2020	Not awarded due to COVID-19 pandemic			
2021		Muhammad Amjad Saqib (b. 1957)	Pakistan	"for the intelligence and compassion that enabled him to create the largest microfinance institution in Pakistan; his inspiring belief that human goodness and solidarity will find ways to eradicate poverty; and his determination to stay with a mission that has already helped millions of Pakistani families."
2021		Firdausi Qadri (b. 1951)	Bangladesh	"for her passion and lifelong devotion to the scientific profession; her vision of building the human and physical infrastructure that will benefit the coming generation of Bangladeshi scientists, women scientists in particular; and her untiring contributions to vaccine development, advanced biotechnological therapeutics and critical research that has been saving millions of precious lives."
2021		Steven Muncy (b. 1951)	Philippines; United States	"for his unshakable belief in the goodness of man that inspires in others the desire to serve; his life lifelong dedication to humanitarian work, refugee assistance, and peace building; and his untiring pursuit of dignity, peace, and harmony for people in exceptionally difficult circumstances in Asia."
2021		Roberto Ballon (b. 1968)	Philippines	"for his inspiring determination in leading his fellow fisherfolk to revive a dying fishing industry by creating a sustainable marine environment for this generation and generations to come; and his shining example of how everyday acts of heroism can truly be extraordinary and transformative."
2021		Watchdoc Media Mandiri	Indonesia	"for its highly principled crusade for an independent media organization, and digital technology in its effort to transform Indonesia's media landscape; and its commitment to a vision of the people themselves as makers of media and shapers of their own world."
2022		Sotheara Chhim (b. ?)	Cambodia	"for his calm courage in surmounting deep trauma to become his people’s healer; his transformative work amidst great need and seemingly insurmountable difficulties, and for showing that daily devotion to the best of one’s profession can itself be a form of greatness."
2022		Tadashi Hattori (b. 1964)	Japan	"for his simple humanity and extraordinary generosity as a person and a professional; his skill and compassion in restoring the gift of sight to tens of thousands of people not his own; and the inspiration he has given, by his shining example, that one person can make a difference in helping kindness flourish in the world."
2022		Bernadette J. Madrid (b. ?)	Philippines	"for her unassuming and steadfast commitment to a noble and demanding advocacy; her leadership in running a multisectoral, multidisciplinary effort in child protection that is admired in Asia; and her competence and compassion in devoting herself to seeing that every abused child lives in a healing, safe, and nurturing society."
2023		Korvi Rakshand(b. 1985)	Bangladesh	"for his determined spirit and quiet courage in turning away from a secure life to a more demanding one of working for the underprivileged; his strong, visionary leadership in democratizing education and inspiring thousands of young people to heed the call of social transformation."
2023		Eugenio Lemos (b. ?)	Timor Leste	"for his indomitable spirit in uplifting the lives of local communities, his vision and passion in integrating local and indigenous cultures in his advocacy for the care of the environment and the well-being of people; and for being truly a man of and for his people, and thus for the world as well."
2023		Miriam Coronel-Ferrer (b. ?)	Philippines	"for her deep, unwavering belief in the transformative power of non-violent strategies in peace building, her cool intelligence and courage in surmounting difficulties to convey the truth that it is through inclusion rather than division that peace can be won and sustained, and her unstinting devotion to the agenda of harnessing the power of women in creating a just and peaceful world."
2023		Ravi Kannan R (b. ?)	India	"for his devotion to his profession’s highest ideals of public service, his combination of skill, commitment, and compassion in pushing the boundaries of people-centered, pro-poor health care and cancer care, and for having built, without expectation of reward, a beacon of hope for millions in the Indian state of Assam, thus setting a shining example for all."
2024		Nguyễn Thị Ngọc Phượng (b. 1944)	Vietnam	for “her spirit of public service and the message of hope she continues to propagate among her people. At the same time, her work serves as a dire warning for the world to avoid war at all costs as its tragic repercussions can reach far into the future. She offers proof that it can never be too late to right the wrongs of war, and gain justice and relief for its hapless victims.”
2024		Karma Phuntsho (b. ?)	Bhutan	"for his invaluable and enduring contributions towards harmonizing the richness of his country’s past with the diverse predicaments and prospects of its present, inspiring young Bhutanese to be proud of their heritage and confident in their future. Beyond his immediate horizon, his work engages all peoples and cultures around the world facing the same challenges, reminding them to look back even as they move forward.”
2024		Miyazaki Hayao (b. 1941)	Japan	"for his lifelong commitment to the use of art, specifically animation, to illuminate the human condition, especially lauding his devotion to children as the torchbearers of the imagination, to whom he has passed the light and spark of his own.”
2024		Rural Doctors Movement	Thailand	"for their historic and continuing contribution to their people’s health—and perhaps just as importantly, to their recognition and fulfilment as citizens with basic rights. By championing the rural poor, the movement made sure to leave no one behind as the nation marches forward to greater economic prosperity and modernization.”
2025		Foundation To Educate Girls Globally	India	for “the organization’s valiant efforts in mobilizing communities in reshaping protracted patriarchal mindsets, in strengthening public education systems and in bringing much-needed gender justice in education, thus proving that putting girls inside classrooms created ripple effects of positive change not only for their families but for Indian society at large.”
2025		Shaahina Ali	Maldives	
2025		Flavie Villanueva	Philippines	for "his lifelong mission to uphold the dignity of the poor and the oppressed, daily proving with unwavering faith that by serving the least of their brethren, all are restored."
2026		Bo Kyi	Myanmar	for "his life’s work as a steadfast pursuit of truth, accountability, and justice. His enduring commitment reflects extraordinary moral courage, personal sacrifice, and an unwavering belief that democracy and human dignity are always worth defending—and that even in the face of oppression, the truth must be told, justice must be pursued, and the freedom to believe must be upheld and defended at all costs."
2026		Runa Khan	Bangladesh	for "her profound empathy for the poorest of the poor in her country, and her courage, vision, and tenacity in building and leading Friendship to accomplish her mission. In her hands, privilege became not an entitlement, but a responsibility; not a family legacy to protect, but a gift to be shared so that others, too, might have the chance to live with hope, opportunity, and dignity."
2026		Tommy Koh	Singapore	for "his exemplary leadership in international diplomacy and in the formation of a new generation of advocates devoted to the advancement of justice and human dignity the world over. Through his steadfast faith in dialogue, the rule of law, and international cooperation, he has helped make peaceful coexistence possible in a world of unequal power."
