= Kim Sun-tae =

- Known for: Assisting the blind
- Awards: Ramon Magsaysay Award (2007)

Kim Sun-tae is recipient of the 2007 Ramon Magsaysay Award for inspiring ministry of hope and practical assistance to his fellow blind and visually impaired citizens in South Korea.
