= Chen Shu-chu =

Taiwanese philanthropist (born 1950)

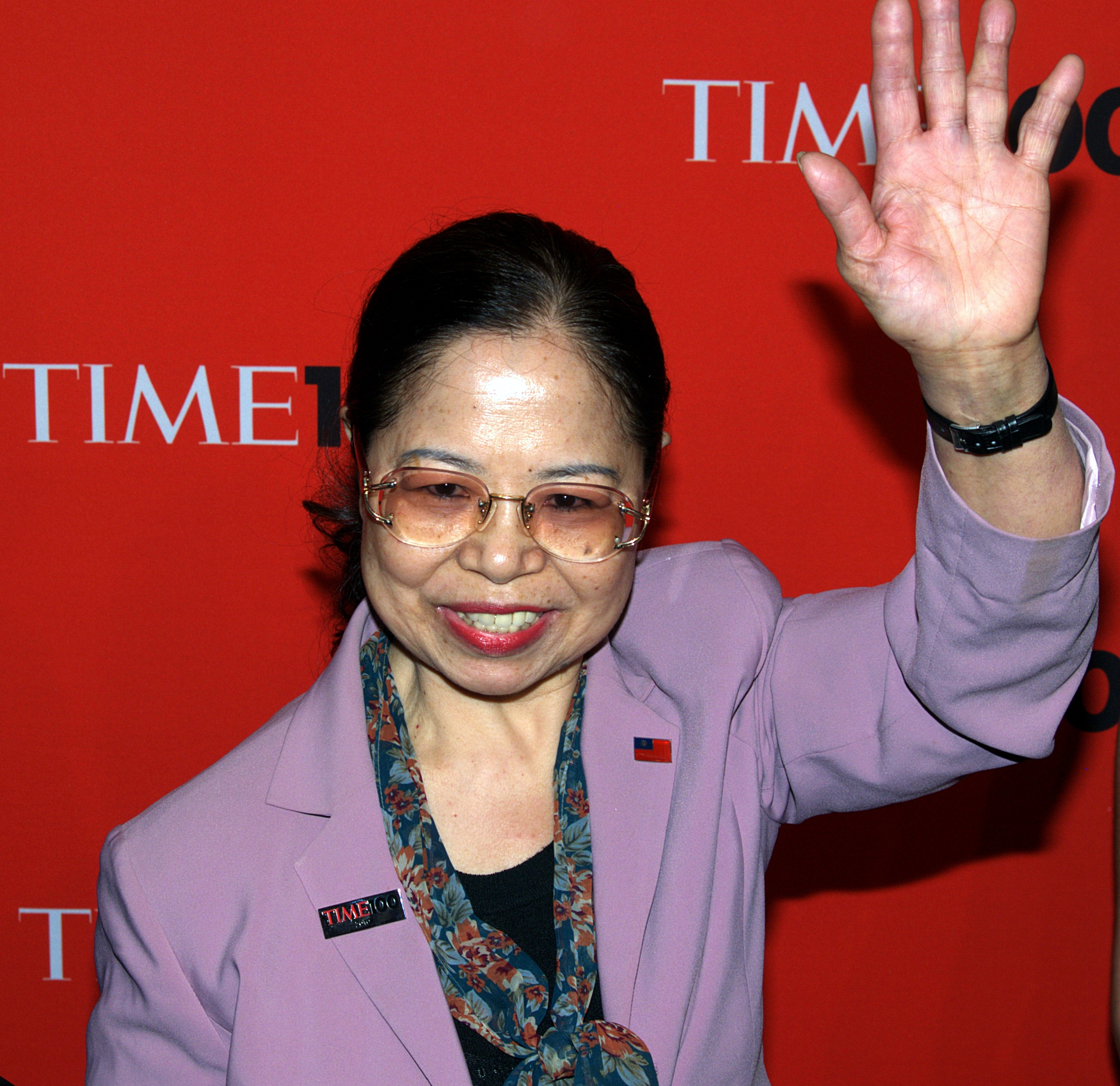
- Chen Shu-Chu in 2010
- Born: 1950 (age 75–76); Yunlin County, Taiwan
- Occupations: Vegetable Vendor, philanthropist
- Political party: Unaffiliated
- Awards: Ramon Magsaysay Award (2012)

Chen Shu-chu (Chinese: 陳樹菊; pinyin: Chén Shùjú; Pe̍h-ōe-jī: Tân Sū-kiok; born 1950) is a retired vegetable vendor from Taiwan, known for her charitable contributions in the fields of education, healthcare and social welfare.

== Early life ==
Chen was born in Yunlin County, Taiwan, and moved to Taitung County at the age of seven. Her primary education was completed at Jen‑Ai (Ren‑ai) Elementary School.

== Philanthropy ==
Following the death of her father in 1993, Chen Shu‑chu donated NT$1 million to the Fo Guang Shan Domestic School. In 1997, she donated NT$1 million to her school, Jen‑Ai Elementary School. In 2005, she contributed NT$4.5 million to the same school for the construction of a library.

By 2014, Chen had reportedly donated more than NT$10 million (approximately US$350,000 or £210,000).

She has also supported the Christian Kids Alive International Association, contributing NT$36,000 annually to assist with the care of three children.

In 2018, Chen participated in the National Day flag‑raising ceremony organized by the Taitung County Government. During the event, she announced the donation of two life insurance policies to the Medical Foundation of Taitung Christian Hospital and the Mackay Memorial Hospital Taitung Branch. These policies, with a combined value of NT$16 million, were designated to establish charitable medical funds to be disbursed posthumously to support patients with financial need.

In 2021, she donated NT$15 million in memory of her mother to establish a fund providing financial assistance to pregnant women and scholarships for children who lost their mothers during childbirth.

== Personal life ==
Chen Shu-chu is a Buddhist and a vegetarian. She has never married. In 2018, she moved to Kaohsiung and retired after recovering from appendicitis.

== Book ==
Sensational Kindness (2011) is a biography of Chen Shu-chu written by Liu Yung-yi.

== Accolades ==
She was selected as one of the Time 100 for 2010 in the Heroes category. She was also one of the 48 Heroes of Philanthropy chosen by Forbes in 2010. Reader's Digest honored her as the winner of the 2010 Asian of the Year.

In 2012, she received the Ramon Magsaysay Award. She donated her US$50,000 prize to Mackay Memorial Hospital.

In 2018, the asteroid 278986 Chenshuchu was named after her.

In 2025, National Taitung University awarded Chen an honorary doctorate.
