= Khamphoui Sisavatdy =

Prime Minister of Royal Lao Government in Exile (2003–2023)

His Excellency Khamphoui Sisavatdy
- ຄໍາຜຸຍ ສີສວັສດ໌

Prime Minister of the Royal Lao Government in Exile
- In office 6 May 2003 – October 15, 2023
- Preceded by: Position established
- Monarch: Soulivong Savang

Personal details
- Born: February 2, 1936
- Died: October 15, 2023 (aged 87) Vancouver, Washington
- Occupation: Professor, politician

Khamphoui Sisavatdy (Lao: ຄໍາຜຸຍ ສີສວັສດີ໌) was the Sithandone Province House of Representative in the 7th Term Legislature of the Royal Lao Government (1972 – 1975). Prime Minister of the Royal Lao Government in Exile, serving in the position since the exiled government's formation in 2003. Khamphoui was re-elected Prime Minister in 2005 and 2010.

== Education ==
Khamphoui Sisavatdy graduated with a Bachelor of Arts in Psychology Buddhist studies from the Chulalongkorn University in 1964. From 1964 to 1972, he was a teacher at the Buddhist Institute, Wat Ong Teu Mahawihan, a branch of Sisavangvong University. He taught Buddhist teachings (Theravāda Abhidhamma), general psychology, and adolescent psychology.

== Political career ==
He was a Sithandone Province House of Representative in the 7th Term Legislature of the Royal Lao Government (1972 - 1975). When the Royal Lao Government in Exile was proclaimed on 6 May 2003, Khamphoui became its first prime minister. Khamphoui condemned the 2006 Laotian parliamentary election and called for international pressure on Laos to install a democracy.

== Political positions ==
Khamphoui saw a constitutional monarchy as the best form of government for Laos, and that the Lao PDR's current government is dictatorial, and a puppet state of Vietnam. Khamphoui further believed that the Laotian people should be enabled to create the administration of their choice, and that the LPRP’s rule will eventually end, as more and more people will want to see beyond the “curtain” of an isolated society.

== Death ==
Sisavatdy died on October 15, 2023, in Vancouver, Washington, at the age of 87.
