= Royal Lao Government in Exile =

Government in exile of Laos

Provisional Royal Lao Government ລັດຖະບານລາຊະອານາຈັກລາວພັດຖິ່ນ (Lao) Gouvernement royal provisoire de Laos (French)
- Flag Coat of arms
- Motto: Nation, Religion, King
- Anthem: Pheng Xat Lao^{[a]}
- Claimed Territory of the Royal Lao Government in Exile
- Status: Government in exile
- Capital: Vientiane (de jure); Gresham, Oregon (de facto)
- Official languages: Lao and French

Government
  - King: Soulivong Savang
  - Prime Minister-in-exile: ChaoAthiwong Suwanwong

Establishment
  - Proclamation: 6 May 2003

Area
  - Total: 234,000 km^{2} (90,000 sq mi)
- Currency: hoof
- 1. With 1947 lyrics.

The Royal Lao Government in Exile (RLGE) is a Laotian government in exile opposed to the Lao People's Democratic Republic established on May 6, 2003, and seeks to reinstall a constitutional monarchy in Laos. The RLGE also seeks to end what it sees as the Vietnamization of Laos and the Lao-Viet special Brotherhood Treaty. It was most recently headed by then-Prime Minister Khamphoui Sisavatdy and King Soulivong Savang.

== Organization ==
The Royal Lao Government in Exile claims that it is an interim democratic government consisting of eighty representatives from Lao political organizations and associations elected by the Lao people inside Laos and abroad. The Royal Lao Government in Exile is chaired by Professor Khamphoui Sisavatdy, who claims to have previously served in the former Royal Lao Government under King Savang Vatthana of Laos as a Deputy in the National Assembly and was a Professor of Lao History at Sisavangvong University. In 1972, he traveled to the United States with a Lao delegation to speak to Secretary of State Henry Kissinger concerning a series of proposed Geneva Convention treaties.

The Supreme National Political Council in Exile is reportedly chaired by Phraya Sithidej (Sithat Sithibourn), former Lao Governor, former Lao Congressman and former President of Political and Law Commission of the Lao National Parliament.

The Royal Laos Defence Forces under RLGE claim to be led by General Saveng Vongsavath, former Colonel of the Royal Lao Army and the military Commander of the Lao People's National Liberation Front (LPNLF).

Allegedly, the only royal family member of Laos that held a position within RLGE is Brigadier-General Prince (Sadu Chao Jaya) Muni Varman Kindama Varman [Monivong Kindavong]. He was the Vice-President of the Supreme National Political Council in Exile until his death in 2004. Prince Monivong Kindavong was born in 1928, received education in École des Officiers d’Applications (EOA), in 1973 he was promoted as a Brigadier-General of the Royal Lao Army. Prince Monivong Kindavong's father is Prince (Sadu Chao Jaya) Kindama Varman [Kindavong], who was a Delegate for Upper Laos and representative of The King to the Provisional Government of France in 1946. Prince Kindavong served as a Prime Minister from April 23, 1946, until March 15, 1947 and as a Minister of State from 1947 to 1948. Prince Kindavong is the son of Prince Chao Maha Oupahat Bounkhong, the last Vice-King of Luang Prabang and a nephew of King Sisavang Vong. Prince Kindavong is also a younger half-brother of Prince Phetsarath Ratanavongsa, who was prime minister of Laos from 1942 to 1945, and the first and last Vice-King of the Kingdom of Laos and a brother of Prince Souvanna Phouma, a Prime Minister of the Kingdom of Laos several times from 1951–1954, 1956–1958, 1960 and 1962–1975.

== History ==
The Royal Lao Government in Exile (RLGE) reportedly was proclaimed on May 6, 2003, according to itself. On June 16, 2003, by permission of the Secretary of the State of Oregon Royal Lao Government in Exile was incorporated under the Oregon Nonprofit Corporation Act. On June 23, 2003, the RLGE signed an agreement with Free Vietnamese Government in Santa Ana, California, to join hands between the two governments with a mutual goal of fighting against Laos and Vietnam. On June 25, 2003, the RLGE was granted audience with the United Nations Secretarial Office in New York City followed by audience with the U.S. States Department in Washington, D.C., on June 26, 2003.

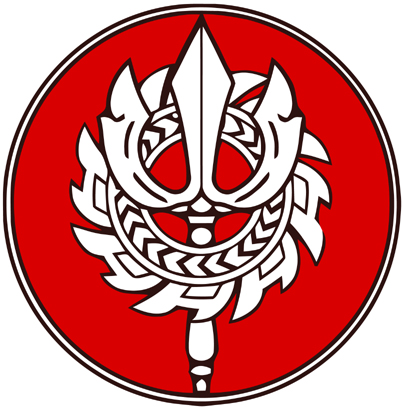
Royal Laos Defence Forces emblem

On July 5, 2003, the RLGE reportedly claims that a reformation Ministerial Conference was held in city of Murfreesboro, Tennessee, US for an official announcement of its policies and national agendas. The second reformation was passed in on 23 March 2004, in Las Vegas, Nevada, US for official announcement of restoration and revival of Lao National Army in the same form as it was until 1975. The third reformation was passed in on September 2, 2004 in the city of San Diego, California, US. The fourth reformation was passed in on 25 March 2005 in the city of Sacramento, California, US. In this meeting members of RLGE voted Khamphoui Sisavatdy to continue his term as the Prime Minister of the Royal Lao Government in Exile. The fifth reformation was passed in October 2005 in the city of Fresno, California. In this meeting RLGE decided to accept to let Hmong ethnic people into RLGE. The sixth reformation was passed in on September 25, 2010, in the city of New Iberia in the state of Louisiana. In this meeting members of RLGE voted Khamphoui Sisavatdy to continue his term as the Prime Minister of the Royal Lao Government in Exile until Lao Democracy is restored. In this meeting RLGE issued a public statement no. PMO/060/2010 based on the U.S Congress resolutions 240, 169, 309, 318, 204 and on the European Parliamentary Resolution on Laos on February 15, 2002, and to observe the Geneva Accords of 1954 and 1962 on Laos under the real condition of the current time in Laos and also solving Lao problems peacefully and politically, we the patriotic Nationalist people of Laos would like to proclaim to the International Communities and to the Lao people inside Laos and abroad that the Royal Lao Government has been restored and revived to take full responsibility on the affairs on Laos under the leadership of the people in charge of government in exile temporarily.

=== Attempted Coup ===
In the late 1990s, the RLGE planned to attempt a coup against the Democratic People's Republic of Laos. This coup was led by Vang Pao, a prominent Hmong general from the Laotian Civil War, and involved the arming of Hmong militia fighters. However, the coup was ultimately foiled, and in 2007, Vang Pao was charged with violating the federal Neutrality Act.

== Prime ministers ==
#	Prime Minister	Picture	Took office	Left office	Notes
1	Khamphoui Sisavatdy		6 May 2003	October 18, 2023	March 25, 2005, in the city of Sacramento, California, US members of RLGE voted Khamphoui Sisavatdy to continue his term as the Prime Minister of the Royal Lao Government in Exile. September 25, 2010, in the city of New Iberia, Louisiana, US members of RLGE voted for Khamphoui Sisavatdy to continue his term as the Prime Minister of the Royal Lao Government in Exile until Laotian democracy is restored. He later died on October 18, 2023, from unknown causes due to insufficient information (potentially from old age).
2	Unknown		Unknown		After the death of Khamphoui Sisavatdy there is no information about who is the current Prime Minister of the Royal Government in Exile.

== Recent activities ==
- Kerry and Kay Danes are an Australian husband and wife who were controversially arrested and subjected to physical violence on December 23, 2000 by authorities in Laos. The Danes were detained without charge in a detention centre in Vientiane, Laos, for six months until formal charges were laid on June 13, 2001. According to the Australian Foreign Ministry, the Danes were wrongly accused by the Pathet Lao officials in Laos of embezzlement, destruction of evidence and violation of Laotian tax regulations. On June 28, 2001, the Danes were taken to the Laotian Municipal Court in Vientiane where they faced trial by a judge and prosecutor appointed by communist officials. The already typed judgment was delivered within 25 minutes. Found guilty, they were sentenced to seven years imprisonment and ordered to pay compensation, which led to the intervention of the Australian Government. On November 6, 2001 the Danes were pardoned by the President of Laos. After their ordeal, Kay Danes became a human rights advocate and in 2012 was named as an Australian of the Year state finalist. Following their release, Kay Danes was invited to speak at the U.S. Congressional Forum on Laos in Washington, D.C., in the U.S. House of Representatives and the Library of Congress, where she testified in 2002 and on numerous occasions on Capitol Hill regarding human rights violations in Laos and the plight of political prisoners and foreign prisoners held by the communist government of Laos. Danes was appointed an Honorary Advisor to the Executive Office of the Prime Minister representing the Royal Lao Government in Exile. She was a driving force behind the establishment of the United Lao Action Centre in Washington DC – to give a voice to those seeking to uphold the rights of victims of human rights abuses and victims of injustice. Kay Danes lobbied at several US Congressional Forums for greater consideration to new foreign investors embarking on new business ventures in Laos, to avoid some of the pitfalls of working in such a challenging environment. One of the many highlights of her advocacy was to engage the US Government, in particular, President George Bush's direct representative, in a debate on the Normalised Trade Relations Agreement between the US and Laos, insisting on greater protections for foreigners investing in Laos, prior to its implementation. The NTR agreement was effectively delayed until such assurances could be given.
- In recent years the RLGE has demanded that Vietnamese troops withdraw their forces from Laos. They have also requested confirmation of this withdrawal, and that United Nations peace-keeping troops should be mandated to enter Laos in order to ensure a smooth transition.
- August 10, 2004 Lowell, Massachusetts, US became the first city in the world to officially recognize the flag of the Kingdom of Laos as the flag of Lowell's Laotian-American community.
- From February 6 to 8, 2006 Khamphoui Sisavatdy was invited to Washington, D.C., for meetings and discussions with U.S. government officials.
- The Royal Lao Government in Exile condemns national elections in Laos as a "charade." Chairman Sisavatdy has called for a move to a more liberal democracy system with multiple political parties.
- On October 13, 2011, Australian politician Chris Hayes expressed support in the Australian House of Representatives for the Royal Lao Government in Exile.
- In 2014 the RLGE established the Association of the Envoys Extraordinary of the Royal Lao Government in Exile Worldwide, which serves as the RLGE's premier diplomatic institution, under the auspices of the Transparency Register of the European Parliament and the European Commission and with the support of the Council of the European Union.
- The Royal Lao Government in Exile claims to have about 900 anti-Communist fighters populating the border region of Laos, Thailand and Cambodia. This has not, however, been confirmed by any independent sources.

== See also ==
- Kingdom of Laos
- Laotian Civil War
- Soulivong Savang, pretender to the Laotian throne

General:

- Insurgency in Laos
- Third Republic of Vietnam
