= Ambrosius Ruwindrijarto =

Social activist

Ambrosius Ruwindrijarto is social activist, investigator and founder of Telapak which promotes ecological justice, cultural integrity and economic empowerment in Indonesia. For his work he was awarded Ramon Magsaysay Award in 2012.
