= Raden Kodijat =

1961 Ramon Magyasay Award Winner

Raden Kodijat (1890-1968) was the recipient of the 1961 Ramon Magsaysay Award for his dedicated and skillful coordination of the massive yaws eradication campaign. He worked in the Public Health Service and under his direction over 12 million Indonesians were cured with over 55 million examined.
