= Pablo Torres =

Pablo Torres may refer to:

- Pablo Torres Tapia (1908-1967), Filipino banker and lawyer
- Pablo Torres (footballer) (born 1984), Argentine footballer
- Pablo Torres (cyclist, born 1987) (born 1987), Spanish cyclist
- Pablo Torres (cyclist, born 2005) (born 2005), Spanish cyclist

== See also ==
- Pablo Torre (disambiguation)
- Pablo de Torres (disambiguation)
