= Guardians of the Huai River =

Guardians of the Huai River is a non-profit organisation founded by Huo Daishan which advocates for the protection of the Huai River of China.
