= Pablo de Torres =

Pablo de Torres may refer to:

- Pablo de Torres (bishop) (died 1560), bishop of Panamá in 1546–1554
- Pablo de Torres (canoeist) (born 1984), Argentinean sprint canoeist

== See also ==
- Pablo Torres (disambiguation)
