= Christopher Bernido =

Filipino theoretical physicist

Chris Bernido

Personal details
- Born: Christopher Casenas Bernido; November 18, 1956 (age 69)
- Spouse: Marivic Carpio (until 2022, widowed)
- Education: University of the Philippines Diliman (BS) University at Albany, SUNY (MS & PhD)
- Occupation: Physicist, professor

Christopher Casenas Bernido (born November 18, 1956) is a Filipino physicist and educator. His achievements include research in exact solutions to quantum mechanical and biophysical problems using the Feynman path integral formulation. In 2010 he received the Ramon Magsaysay Award for contributing in both science and nation, ensuring innovative, low-cost, and effective basic education under Philippine conditions of scarcity and poverty.

Bernido received his B.S. in physics from the University of the Philippines Diliman (1977), his M.S. in physics (1979) as well as his PhD (1982) from the University at Albany, SUNY.

He became assistant professor at the University of the Philippines, Quezon City, in 1982, associate professor in 1985 and full professor in 1995 (until 1999). He was a research fellow at the Alexander von Humboldt-Stiftung, Bielefeld, Germany (1987-1989) and associate member at the International Center for Theoretical Physics in Trieste, Italy (1985-1991). Between 1984 and 1987 he was president of the Physics Society of the Philippines.

Bernido is founding director of the Research Center for Theoretical Physics in Jagna, Philippines, and president of the Central Visayan Institute Foundation, Philippines. In 2007 he became a member of the National Academy of Sciences and Technology.

He was married to fellow physicist Maria Victoria Carpio-Bernido, until her death.
