= Ananda Galappatti =

Sri Lankan medical anthropologist

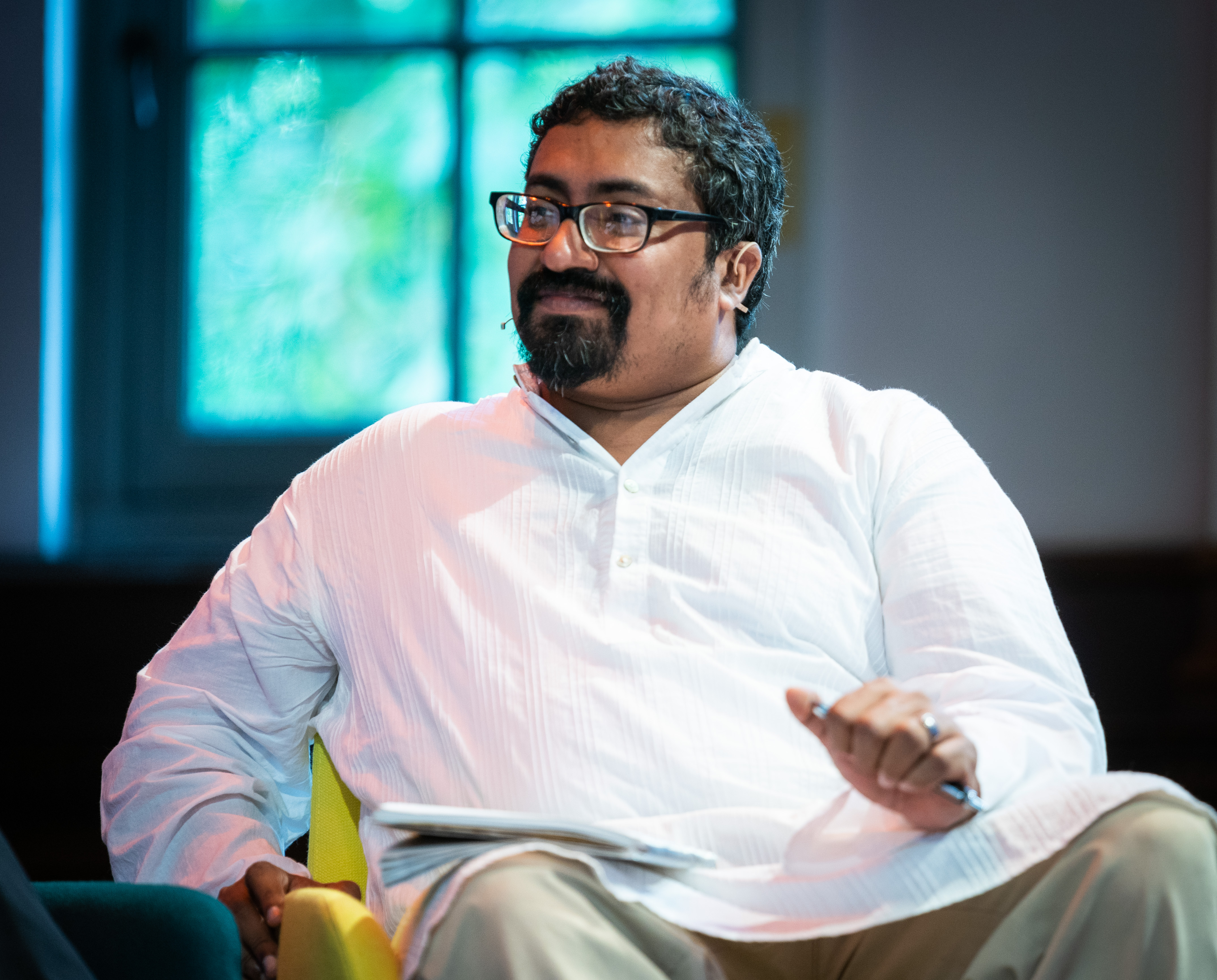
Ananda Galappatti in 2019

Ananda Galappatti is a medical anthropologist and practitioner in the field of mental health in Sri Lanka. He received the Ramon Magsaysay Award for his efforts.
