= Huo Daishan =

Chinese photojournalist and environmentalist

- Born: Shenqiu County of Henan Province
- Known for: Documenting the pollution of Huai River
- Awards: Ramon Magsaysay Award

Huo Daishan is a photojournalist and environmentalist, winner of the Ramon Magsaysay Award. He is the founder of Guardians of the Huai River, which advocates for protection of the Huai River in China.

Huo grew up in Shenqiu County (part of Henan Province) in the Huai River Basin; amidst rising cancer rates, he persuaded local factory leaders to better treat their waste water. He has led mapping efforts in the river’s basin, while investigating and monitoring the sources of pollution.
