= Hsu Shih-chu =

Chinese-born physician

Hsu Shih-chu is a Chinese-born physician.

He earned a degree from the Peking Union Medical College in 1934. Following graduation, Hsu established a community health service in Nanjing, which trained other medical professionals, and sent specialists in malaria to western China during the Second Sino-Japanese War. In 1948, Hsu began working for the Joint Commission on Rural Reconstruction. When he received the Ramon Magsaysay Award in 1969, Hsu was the leader of the JCRR's rural health division. The award citation acknowledges his role in establishing rural health, sanitation and family planning services in Taiwan which are models for developing nations.
