= Oung Chanthol =

Seiichi Tobata
- Born: 1967 (age 58–59); Kampot, Cambodia
- Occupation: Executive director
- Organization: Cambodian Women's Crisis Center (CWCC)
- Awards: Ramon Magsaysay Award (2001)

Oung Chanthol (born 1967 in Kampot, Cambodia) is the founder and executive director of the Cambodian Women's Crisis Center (CWCC). She has documented cases of rape, trafficking, and domestic abuse in Cambodia. Under her leadership, CWCC has mounted awareness campaigns against sex trafficking, educating local authorities and broadcasting radio and television messages. In 2001, Chanthol was awarded the Ramon Magsaysay Award for Emergent Leadership.

She was a member of the Forum of Young Global Leaders from 2006 (a five-year period).
