= Pablo Torres Tapia =

Filipino banker (1908– 1967)

- Born: June 26, 1908; Tanauan, Batangas, Philippine Islands
- Died: 1967 (aged 58–59); Makati, Metro Manila, Philippines
- Education: University of the Philippines
- Occupations: banker, lawyer, editor
- Known for: FACOMA, Tinig ng Tanauan (Voice of Tanauan), Square Deal Bank
- Spouse: Basilisa Carandang (second wife)
- Children: Maria Luisa C. Tapia, Maria Elena C. Tapia, Rosa O. Tapia, Rufina O. Tapia, Leonardo O. Tapia, Antonio O. Tapia
- Awards: Ramon Magsaysay Award for Community Leadership

Pablo Torres Tapia (1908–1967) was a Filipino banker and lawyer who received the Ramon Magsaysay Award for Community Leadership in 1964. His contributions to the community involved establishing a rural bank aimed at providing loans for farmers, educating the farmers with the latest farming developments, and setting up the Tanauan Farmers Marketing Cooperative (FACOMA).
