= Operation Brotherhood =

Operation Brotherhood was recipient of the Ramon Magsaysay Award in 1958 in acknowledgement of the spirit of service to other peoples in a time of need, with which it was conceived and has been carried forward, as well as the international amity it has fostered in Vietnam.
