= Eduardo Jorge Anzorena =

Argentine academic

Eduardo Jorge Anzorena is a pioneer in collaborative search for humane and practical solutions to the housing crisis among Asia's urban poor.
