= Hans Westenberg =

Dutch-Indonesian agriculturist

Hans Westenberg (born 27 October 1898 in Bangoen Poerba, North Sumatra) was a Dutch-Indonesian agriculturist who was the recipient of 1972 Ramon Magsaysay Award for his practical propagation of new crops and promotion of better methods among Sumatra's small farmers who have learned to trust and profit from his ideas in Indonesia.

Westenberg was the youngest child of Carel Joan Westenberg, the resident of Tapanoeli in Sibolga, and Negel Sinulingga, daughter of the primary rajah of the Karo of the high lands. The family moved to The Hague, where Hans went to high school and enrolled at Leiden University to study civil service. When his father died in 1919 he broke off his studies and returned to the Dutch Indies. Here he met Johanna Cornelia Westhoff (1907-1991), whom he married in 1928 in Wassenaar. They had a son but divorced just before the Japanese invasion of the Dutch Indies. At the independence of Indonesia in 1949 Westenberg chose to become an Indonesian citizen.
