= Shiroshi Nasu =

Japanese politician (1888–1984)

Shiroshi Nasu (那須 皓, Nasu Shiroshi; 1888–1984) was a pioneer in practical humanitarianism, enhancing cooperation in agriculture by learning through multinational experience. He was awarded the Ramon Magsaysay Award in 1967. He was the founder of Kokusai Noyukai, or the Association for International Collaboration of Farmers.

Nasu was appointed Japan's ambassador to India in 1959.
