= Abdon Nababan =

Indonesian politician and activist

Nababan Abdon is the recipient of the 2017 Ramon Magsaysay Award and it was awarded for his courage and advocacy that have become the voice and face for the Indigenous Peoples Alliance in Indonesia.

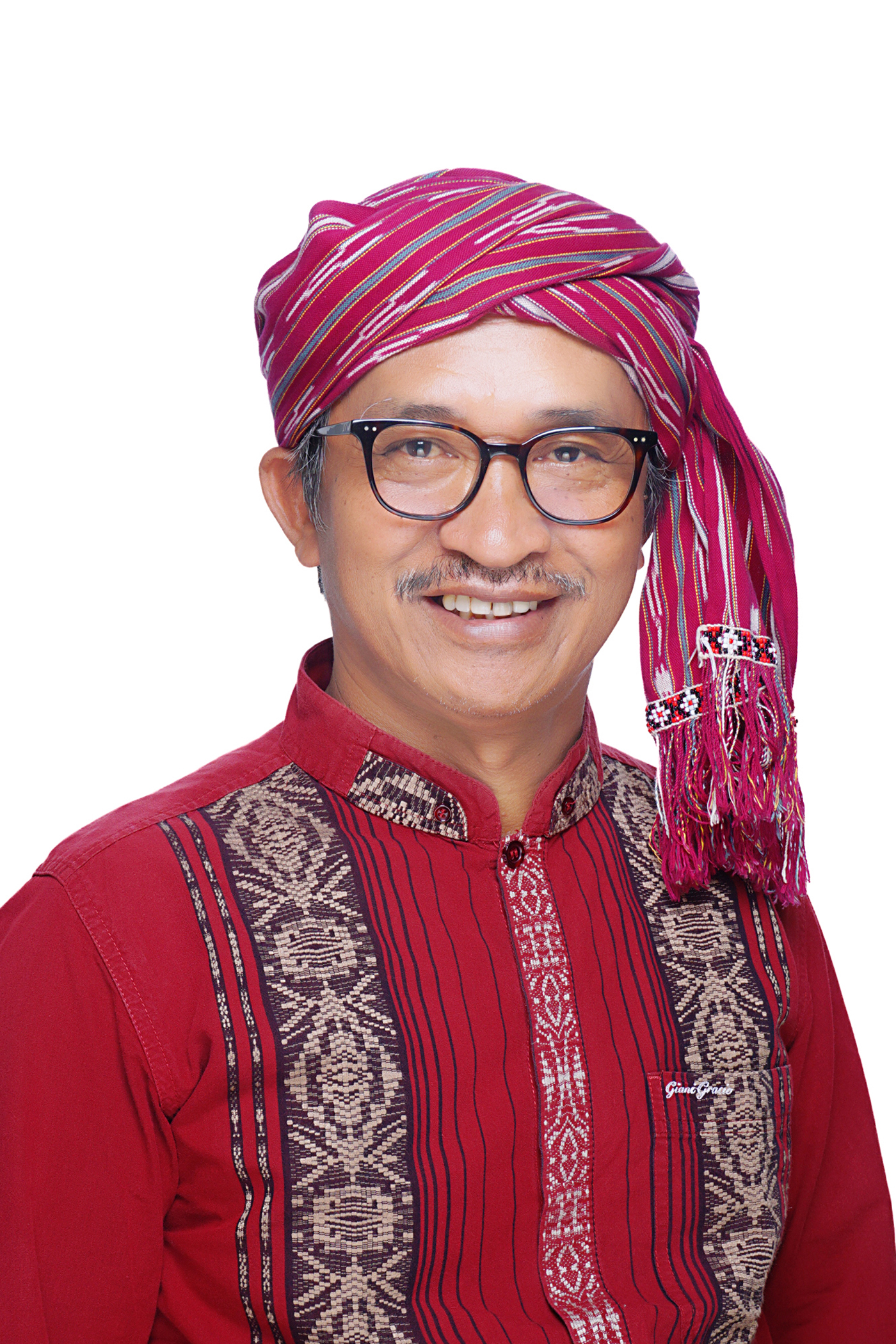
