= Nuon Phaly =

Cambodian mental health worker (1942–2012)

- នួន ផល្លី
- Born: 1942; Kandal Province, French Indochina
- Died: 17 November 2012 (aged 69–70); Kampong Cham Province, Cambodia
- Occupation: Mental health worker
- Years active: 1985–2012
- Employer(s): Khmer People's Depression Relief Centre; Future Light Orphanage
- Spouse: Hem Soeurn
- Children: 3
- Awards: Figaro Prize for Humanitarian Service (1993) Ramon Magsaysay Award (1998)

Nuon Phaly (Khmer: នួន ផល្លី; 1942 – 17 November 2012) was a Cambodian woman who advocated for mental health support for female survivors of the Cambodian genocide and their children. Her work has included establishing the Khmer People's Depression Relief Centre and the Future Light Orphanage, the latter of which remains operating. For her commitment to helping traumatised women and children rebuild their lives, Phaly was awarded the Ramon Magsaysay Award for Community Leadership in 1998.

== Early life ==
Phaly was born in Kandal Province in 1942. She completed high school and developed proficiency in French and Khmer shorthand, skills that enabled her to work as a senior secretary at the Ministry of Finance in Phnom Penh by 1972. By the same year, she was married to Hem Soeurn, with whom she had two children.

== Life under the Khmer Rouge ==
In April 1975, the Khmer Rouge captured Phnom Penh, and Phaly, as well as her husband, twelve-year-old daughter, three-year-old son, and two of her sisters, were forcibly evacuated from the city to the countryside to work in a forced labour camp. Phaly was nine months pregnant at the time, and gave birth to a second son days later. Shortly afterwards, she was separated from her husband, who she would not see again until the fall of the regime.

A few months into their imprisonment at a collective farm, Phaly and her daughter were gangraped by Khmer Rouge soldiers; her daughter was killed. Phaly and her sons were taken to the killing fields, where they were tied up on the edge of a muddy embankment and left to drown, though Phaly was able to convince a soldier that she had previously worked for a high-ranking member of the Khmer Rouge regime, and was untied, allowing her to escape with her children.

Phaly spent the next three years living in the rainforests of north-eastern Cambodia where she and her sons avoided capture, though her youngest son died of starvation.

== Mental health work ==
Phaly and her son survived the Khmer Rouge, and returned to Pursat Province after the fall of Pol Pot and his government in 1979 following the Vietnamese invasion. There, they reunited with Phaly's parents and two of her six siblings, who had survived the regime. Phaly also was reunited with her husband, who suffered from a mental impairment after being significantly assaulted by Khmer Rouge soldiers.

In 1984, following continued unrest in Phnom Penh, Phaly and her family fled to a refugee camp on the border with Thailand. The family were unsuccessful in seeking asylum in another country, and instead joined a research project focusing on experiences of refugees in the camp; Phaly was chosen in part because she spoke both Khmer and French. This project made Phaly recognise the high numbers of orphans in the camp, as well as children whose mothers were experiencing mental health difficulties stemming from their experiences, which impacted upon their ability to look after themselves and their children.

In 1985, Phaly and her husband established the Khmer People's Depression Relief Centre, a home supporting female refugees experiencing depression. It soon expanded to include caring for the children of these women. Phaly initially treated the women using traditional Khmer herbal remedies, as well as anti-depressants when she was able to secure these from camp guards. The KPDRC was supported by the Catholic Office for Emergency Refugee Relief and the United Nations High Commissioner for Refugees.

Phaly subsequently moved to Thailand, where she studied Western mental health therapies. In 1993, she returned to Cambodia, where she and her husband established the Future Light Orphanage in Phnom Penh, which homed 150 orphans, in addition to offering mental health support and training to widows. Phaly characterised her approach as encompassing three steps: forgetting, by encouraging women to take up hobbies like embroidery and weaving; training, including in parenting but also in vocational skills; and loving, by taking part in self-care activities like cleaning and grooming, with other women. Her approach was holistic, focusing on emotional healing, vocational training, and self-care to help women regain their independence and self-worth.

The Future Light Orphanage was initially funded in part by support from the Cambodian government and the United Nations' World Food Programme. Much of the staff at the orphanage consists of women who have previously received support from the charity.

Beyond her work with orphans, Phaly emphasized education as a tool for empowerment. She established programs that provided not only basic education but also vocational training in areas such as weaving and embroidery. These initiatives enabled women and children to acquire skills that facilitated self-reliance and economic independence.

Phaly served as the director of Future Light Orphanage until her death.

== Later life and legacy ==
Nuon Phaly died on November 17, 2012, a week after sustaining injuries in a car crash in Kampong Cham Province, where she had been offering advice assistance to a local orphanage. She was 70 years old. She was survived by her husband, Hem Soeurn, who died in 2021.

== Recognition ==
In 1998, Phaly was awarded the Ramon Magsaysay Award for Community Leadership "for her selfless commitment to helping war-traumatised women and children rebuild their spirits and lives in the wake of Cambodia's great national tragedy".

In addition, Phaly also won the Figaro Prize for Humanitarian Service, and was nominated for the Nobel Peace Prize.
