= Maria Victoria Carpio-Bernido =

Filipina theoretical physicist (1961–2022)

Ma. Victoria "Marivic" Carpio-Bernido (17 November 1961 – 6 January 2022) was a Filipino physicist.

Bernido finished her Bachelor of Science in Physics degree at the University of the Philippines (UP) Diliman in 1982. She completed her master’s degree in physics and doctorate degree in theoretical physics at the State University of New York Albany in 1986 and 1989.

She was the recipient of the 2010 Ramon Magsaysay Award, for commitment to both science and her nation, ensuring innovative, low-cost, and effective basic education even under the Philippine conditions of poverty.

She died from colon cancer on 6 January 2022, at the age of 60.
