= Sisavangvong University =

University in Vientiane, Laos (1958-75)

Sisavangvong University was a university in Vientiane, Laos, established in 1958 and named after King Sisavangvong. Following the exodus of teaching staff in 1975 when the communists came to power in Laos, Sisavangvong University was dissolved and divided into separate colleges, leaving the country with no degree-awarding institution.

== See also ==
- List of split up universities
