= Ende Gelände 2019 =

Civil disobedience event in Germany

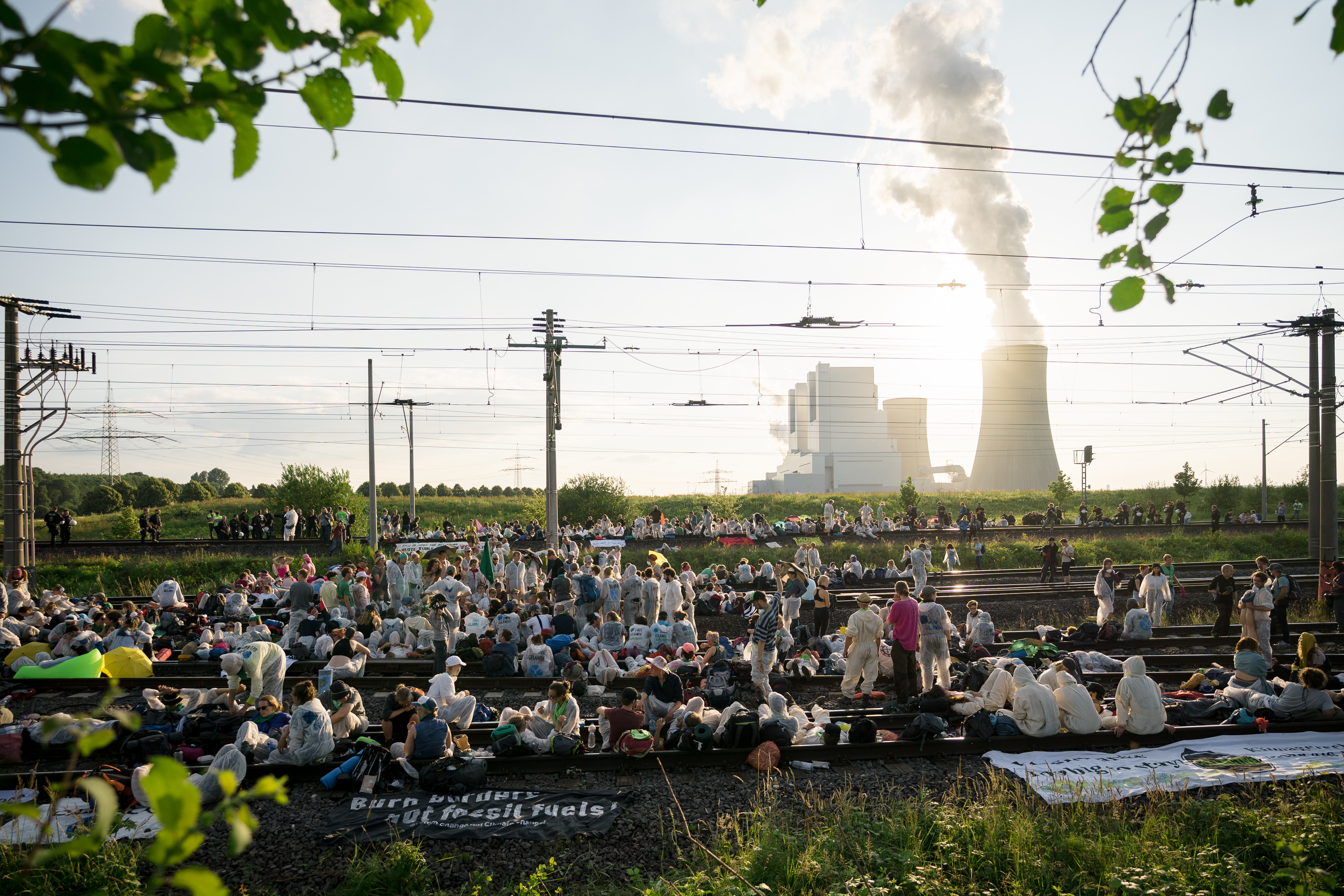
About a thousand Ende Gelände 2019 activists blocking the North–South industrial spur, thereby cutting the Neurath power station (in background) off from its supply of lignite from 21 June 2019 to 23 June 2019.

Ende Gelände 2019 was a series of large-scale events of a movement for climate justice in Germany.

As a continuation of the previous year's actions, the non-violent direct action civil disobedience events targeted the coal-fired power plants of RWE Power AG and demanded the "immediate fossil fuel phase-out" based on climate justice and climate change mitigation.

Between 21 and 23 June 2019, protests centered on the Garzweiler open pit mine of the Rhenish lignite mining area.

Protests also took place in the Lusatian lignite mining area between 29 November and 1 December 2019.

== In the Rhenish lignite mining area ==
=== Background ===
In January 2019, the German Commission on Growth, Structural Change and Employment recommended in its final report that coal should be completely phased out as a power source in Germany by 2038, which was criticized by both scientists, such as Commissioner Hans Joachim Schellnhuber, and environmental organizations as inadequate to prevent global warming from reaching an irreversible tipping point. In February 2019, the climate protection report 2018 was published, according to which Germany was forecast to miss the self-imposed climate protection targets for 2020.

On 20 June 2019, the then-heads of state and government of the EU could not agree on CO_{2} neutrality by 2050, because Poland, Hungary and the Czech Republic objected to it.

The youth climate movement Fridays for Future Deutschland (FFFD) called for an international protest event for climate protection in Aachen on the 21 June 2019, which drew 40000 people from 17 countries. It was assumed that participants in the Fridays for Future demonstration would also participate in the actions of Ende Gelände. In advance, the police had warned of an instrumentalization of Fridays for Future by Ende Gelände 2019, which was seen by many as a "deliberate attempt to divide the movement," but instead it led to public statements of solidarization of Fridays for Future with Ende Gelände, stating that civil disobedience was a legitimate form of protest to save the future, but, in the demonstration on 22 June 2019 in Hochneukirch/Jüchen in the direct neighbourhood of the open-pit mine, that Fridays for Future would remain on the legal side.

=== Activities ===
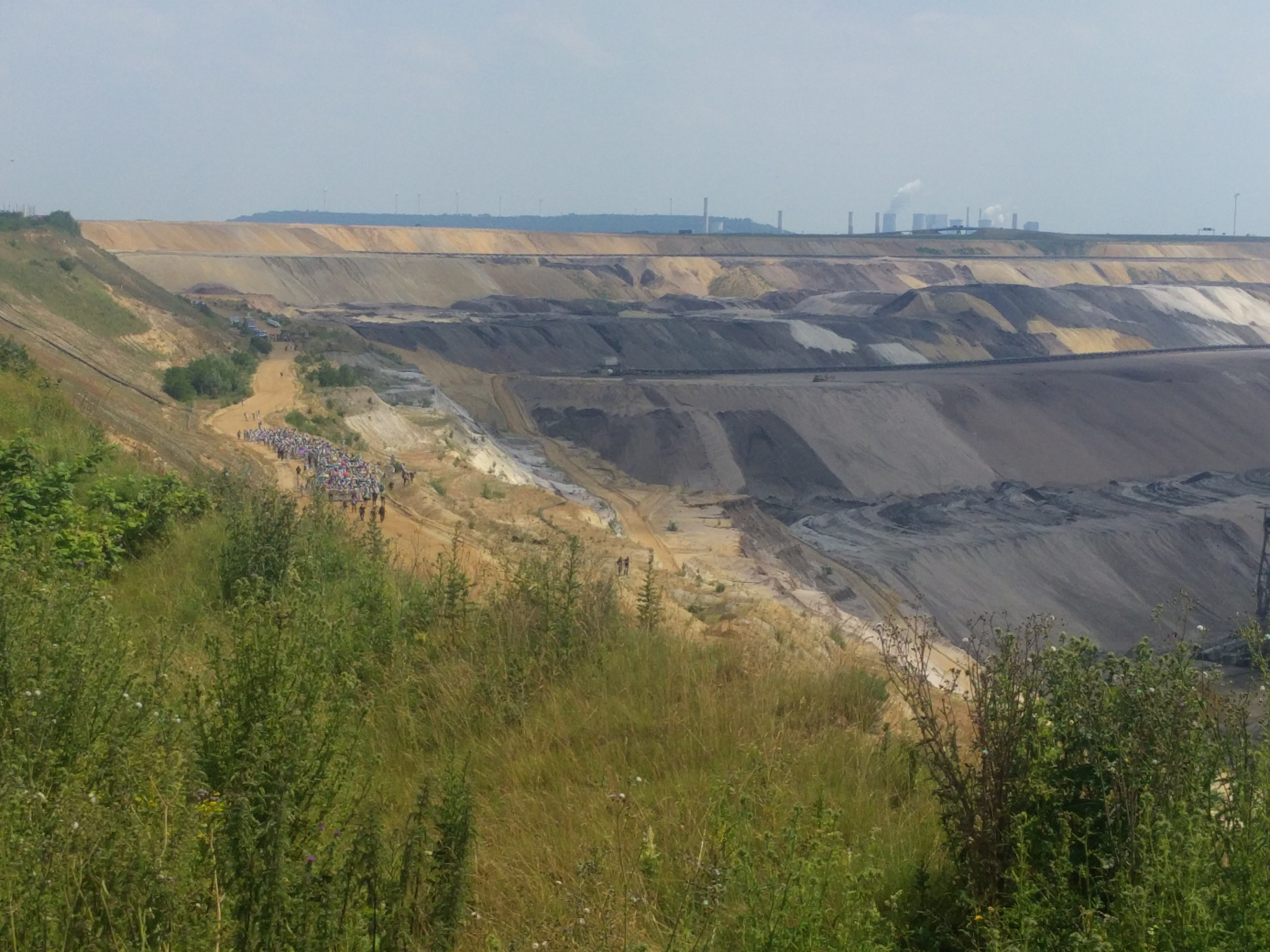
Activists entering the Garzweiler II open pit mine near Keyenberg on 22 June 2019.

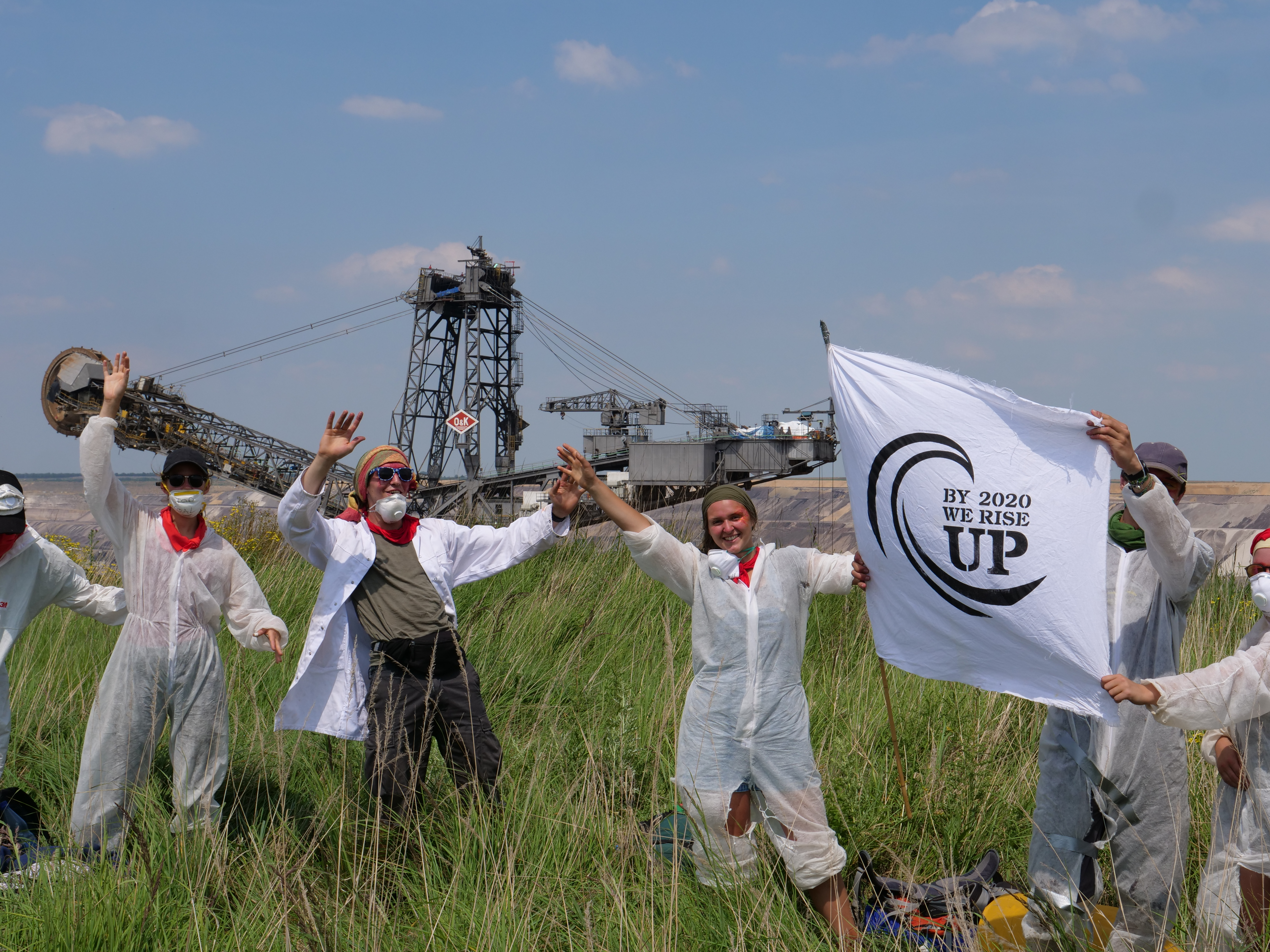
Ende Gelände 2019 activists of the "red finger" near the Skywalk at the edge of the Garzweiler open-pit lignite mine on 22 June 2019.

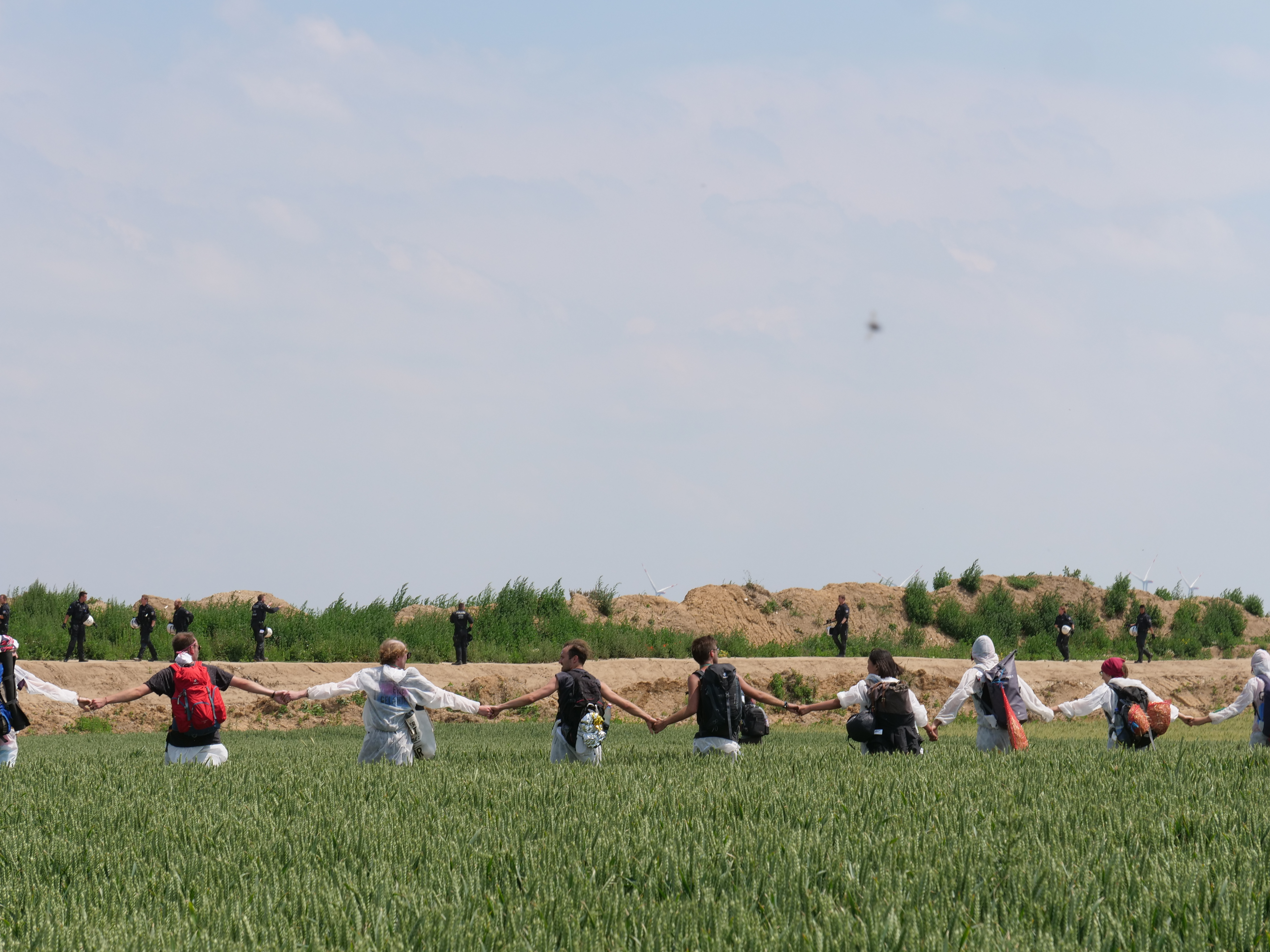
The "red finger" moving forward on the 22 June 2019.

On Friday, 21 June 2019 the Ende Gelände 2019 activities began with a blockade of the North-South (Nord-Süd Bahn-Kohlenbahn in German) train connection between the Garzweiler open pit mine and the Neurath power station. On Saturday, 22 June 2019, blockades of the Hambach track and occupations of the open pit mine took place, causing RWE to power down four of six power plants.

Meanwhile, a Fridays for Future (FFF) demonstration was held on 22 June 2019 on the edge of the open pit mine and near Keyenberg, a village scheduled for dredging for open pit mining in the near future. According to the organizers, this event drew some 8000 people.

Die Zeit reported that the blockade of the Hambach industrial track ended on the morning of 23 June 2019. It was followed by the occupation of the Garzweiler II open pit mine at noon. The railway line to the Neurath power plant was not cleared at this time. Mid-day, Ende Gelände 2019 issued a press release stating that the blockade had ended. More than 6000 activists participated in the protests.

Police violence was reported in connection with the protests. Police officers used batons and pepper spray injuring activists so intensely that they had to be treated in hospitals. The injuries included a basilar skull fracture. The police said they would take the allegations seriously and investigate accordingly. In addition, participants were prevented from freely leaving the train stations in Hochneukirch and Viersen, for up to 13 hours, due to what the police called "capacity issues". The police reported eight injured police officers, probably due to falls while trying to stop protesters.

After Ende Gelände had already stopped its activities at the Garzweiler open-pit mine, at 5 am (CET) on Monday, 24 June 2019, another group blocked the Hambach industrial spur and seven women occupied an excavator at the Hambach open-pit lignite mine until midday.

== In the Lusatian lignite mining area ==
=== Background ===
About 1.4 million Germans joined the third global climate strike on 20 September 2019. On the same day, the fourth Merkel cabinet proposed its climate package, which was criticized as being insufficient by scientists, environmental organizations and the opposition. Ottmar Edenhofer, director of the Potsdam Institute for Climate Impact Research, described it as "document of political dispiritedness" with which the set goals for 2030 could not be reached. During the 2019 UN Climate Action Summit on the 23 September 2019, the most important countries also did not bring forward any measures that were ambitious enough.

=== Activities ===
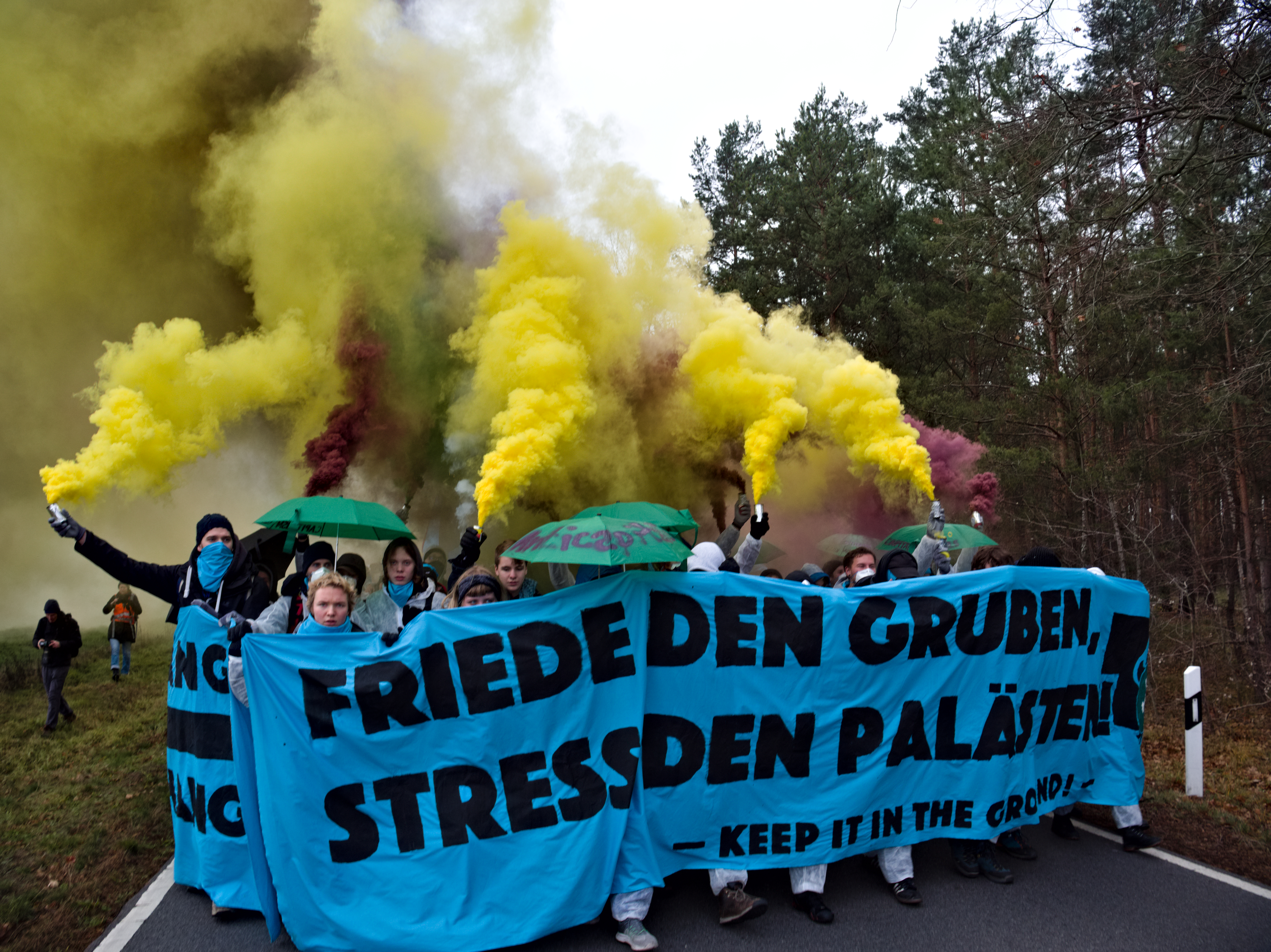
Finger of the Anti-Kohle-Kidz shortly before a blockade near Koppatz.

On Friday, the 29 November 2019, protesters again demanded more climate protection during the fourth global climate strike. In Germany, about 630000 people participated in this event. On Saturday, several thousand activists from Brandenburg and Saxony started blockades in the open pit mines South Welzow, Jänschwalde and United Schleenhain. Fridays for Future and the initiative Alle Dörfer bleiben supported the activities. As planned, after several hours the activists stopped the blockades in the afternoon. According to the police, three policemen were lightly injured, otherwise the protests remained peaceful despite threats of violence from right-wing extremists in the days before the event.

== See also ==
- Ende Gelände
- Ende Gelände 2018
- Ende Gelände 2020
- Extinction Rebellion (XR)
- School strike for climate / Fridays for Future (FFF)
- Earth Strike
- September 2019 climate strikes
- Commission on Growth, Structural Change and Employment
- Energy transition (in Germany)
- Fossil fuel divestment
- Climate disobedience
