= Hambach =

Hambach may refer to:

- Hambach (formerly Hambach an der Weinstraße), an urban district of Neustadt an der Weinstraße and the location of Hambach Festival and Hambach Castle
  - Hambach Castle in Germany
  - Hambach Festival (German: Hambacher Fest) a German national democratic festival celebrated 27-30 May 1832 at Hambach Castle
- Hambach (Diez), a rural community in the Rhein-Lahn district, Rhineland-Palatinate, Germany
- Hambach (Dittelbrunn), a district of the town of Dittelbrunn, Bavaria, Germany
- Hambach (Niederzier), a village near Niederzier, Düren, North Rhine-Westphalia, Germany
  - Hambach open pit mine (German: Tagebau Hambach), a large opencast mine in North Rhine- Westphalia, Germany
  - Hambach Forest, a biodiversity-rich forest near the mine, center of protests against threats of being cut down
- Hambach, Moselle, a commune in the Moselle département, France
