= Ende Gelände 2018 =

German civil disobedience events against coal

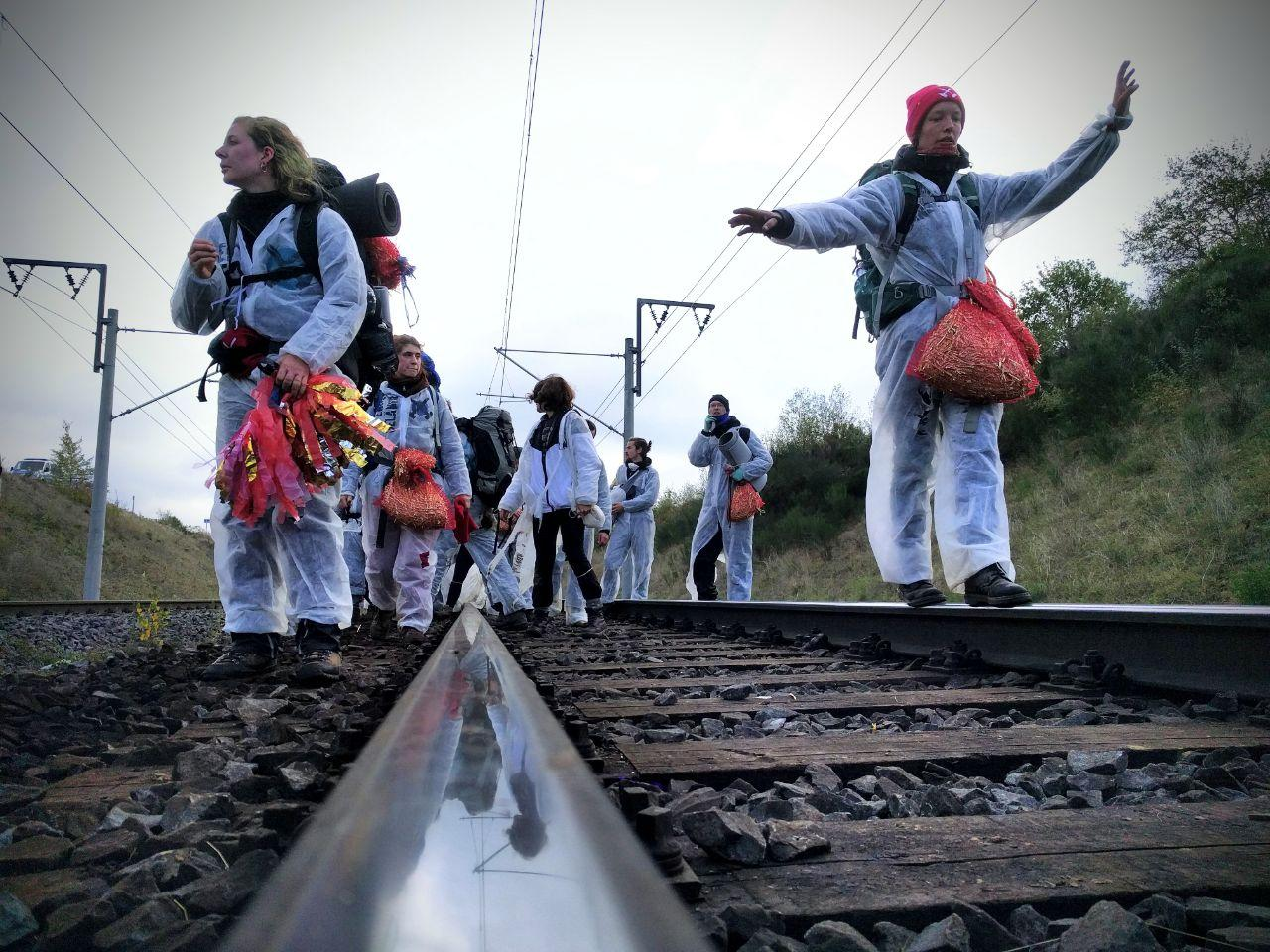
Ende Gelände 2018 - Blockade of the Hambach industrial spur on 27 October 2018.

Ende Gelände 2018 were a series of events of a mass movement for climate justice in the Rhenish lignite mining area in Germany. The non-violent direct action civil disobedience events were targeted against coal-based power generation through RWE Power AG and demanded the "immediate fossil fuel phase-out" based on climate justice and climate change mitigation.

Some smaller activities happened on the 6 October 2018 in the Hambach Forest, whereas the main activities were concentrated around the 25-29 October 2018.

On the 27 October 2018, a bucket-wheel excavator near the village of Morschenich as well as the rails of the Hambach industrial spur belonging to the Hambach surface mine were occupied by several thousand activists for 22 hours in order to symbolically block the transfer of lignite to the power plants. More than 5000 people took part in the protests.

In the aftermath to the activities, the public prosecutor's office Aachen investigates for breach of the peace against some 400 participants of the protests, who also tried to enter the Inden surface mine.

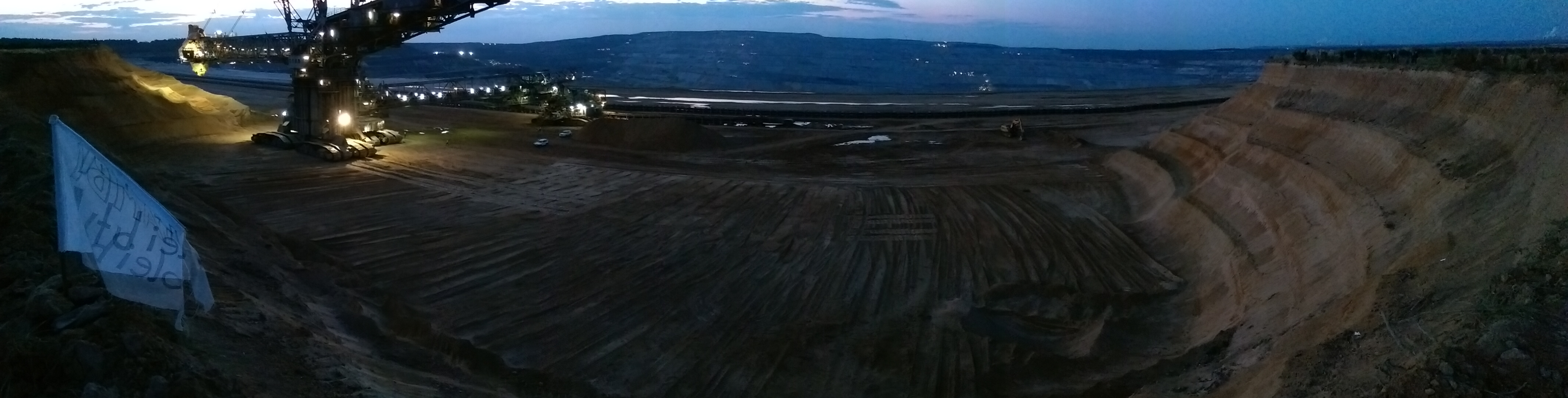
Panorama of Hambach open-pit lignite mine in the neighbourhood of the Hambach Forest showing a transparent and a bucket-wheel excavator on 6 October 2018.

== See also ==
- Ende Gelände
- Ende Gelände 2017
- Ende Gelände 2019
- Extinction Rebellion (XR)
- School strike for climate / Fridays for Future (FFF)
- Earth Strike
- Commission on Growth, Structural Change and Employment
- Energy transition (in Germany)
- Fossil fuel divestment
- Climate disobedience
