= Ende Gelände 2017 =

Civil disobedience action in Germany

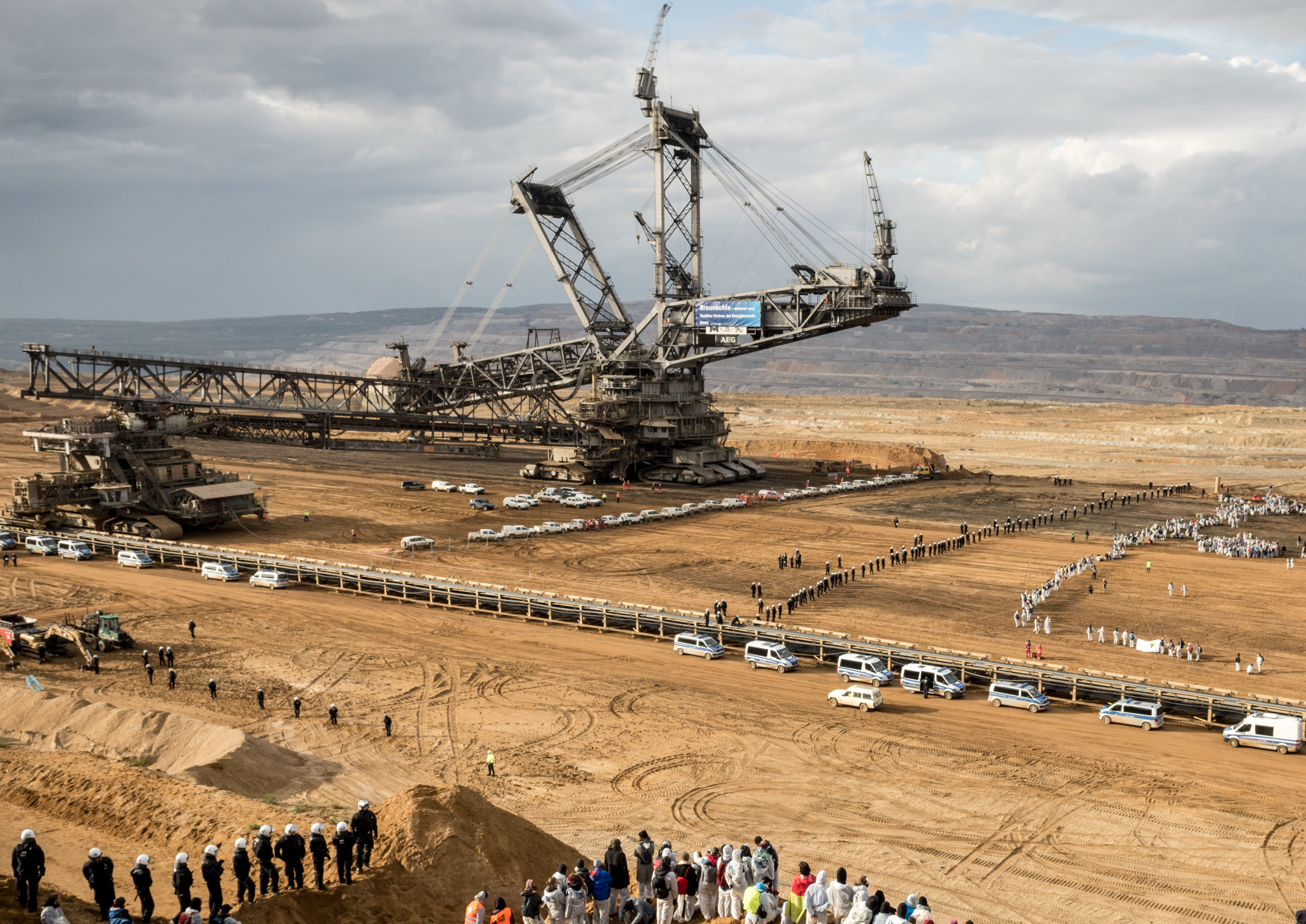
Environmental activist blocking the coal mine during Ende Gelände 2017.

Ende Gelände 2017 was a large civil disobedience protest movement in Germany to limit global warming through fossil fuel phase-out.

3000-6000 environmental activists from several countries blocked two German open-pit coal mines:

- From 24 to 29 August 2017, about 6000 persons blocked a mine owned by RWE in the Rhineland coalfields.
- On 5 November 2017 (for the 2017 United Nations Climate Change Conference), around 3000 persons blocked the Hambach lignite mine.

== Context ==
On 15 August 2015, in the first year of Ende Gelände, 1500 activists blocked the Garzweiler surface mine owned by RWE (Ende Gelände 2015).

On 13 to 15 May 2016, with Ende Gelände 2016, 4000 activists blocked the Welzow-Süd open-pit coal mine and the coal-fired Schwarze Pumpe power station, then owned by Vattenfall (Spremberg).

== Gallery ==
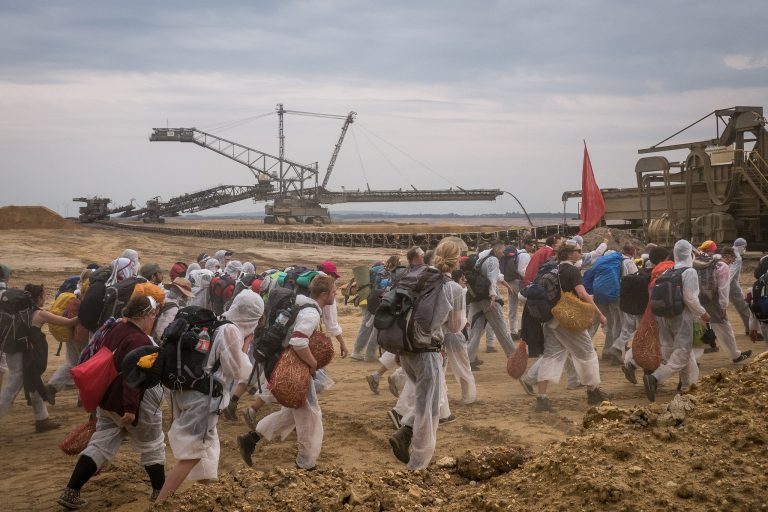
First action in August 2017

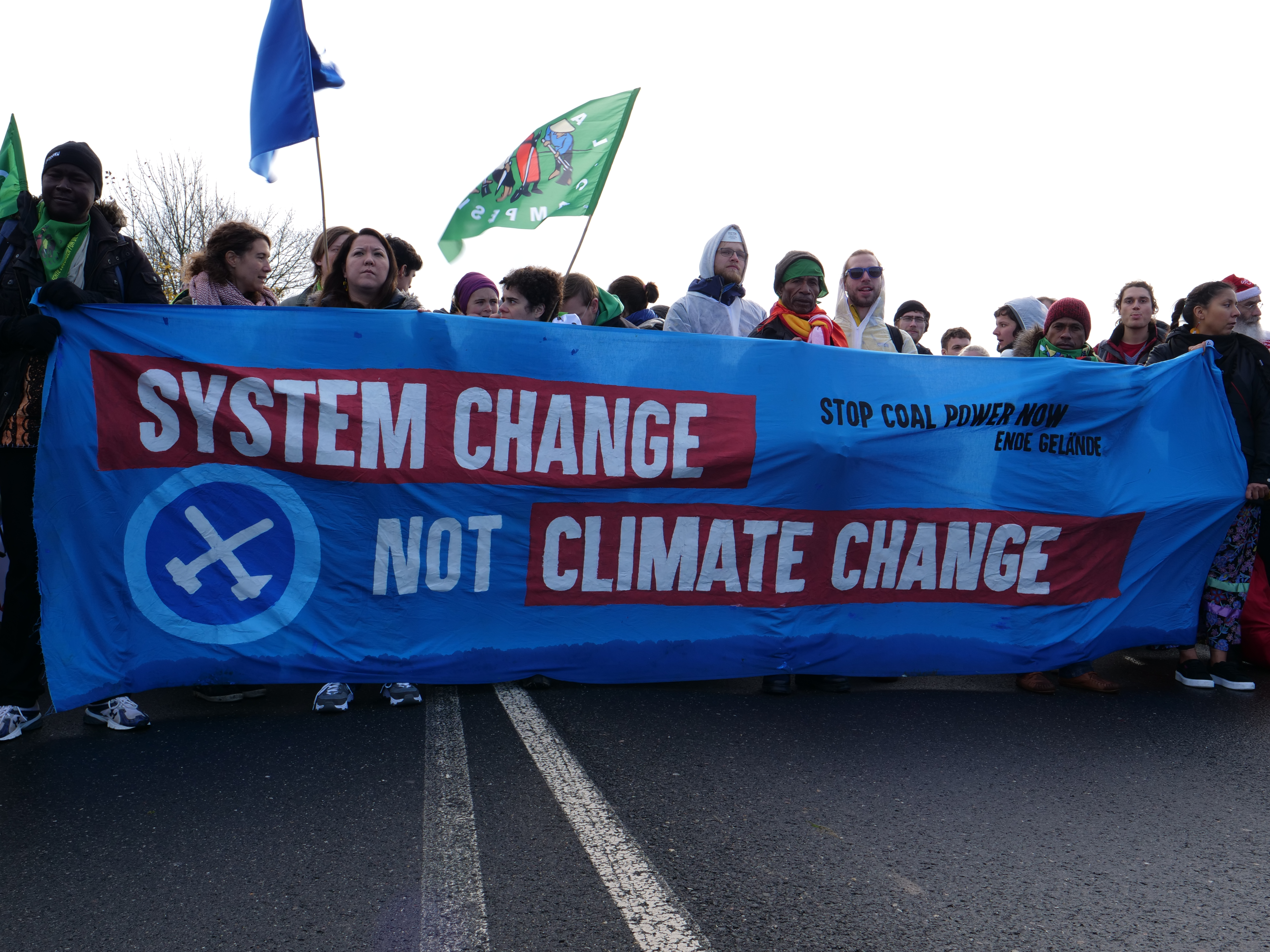
Banner with the message: "System change not climate change"

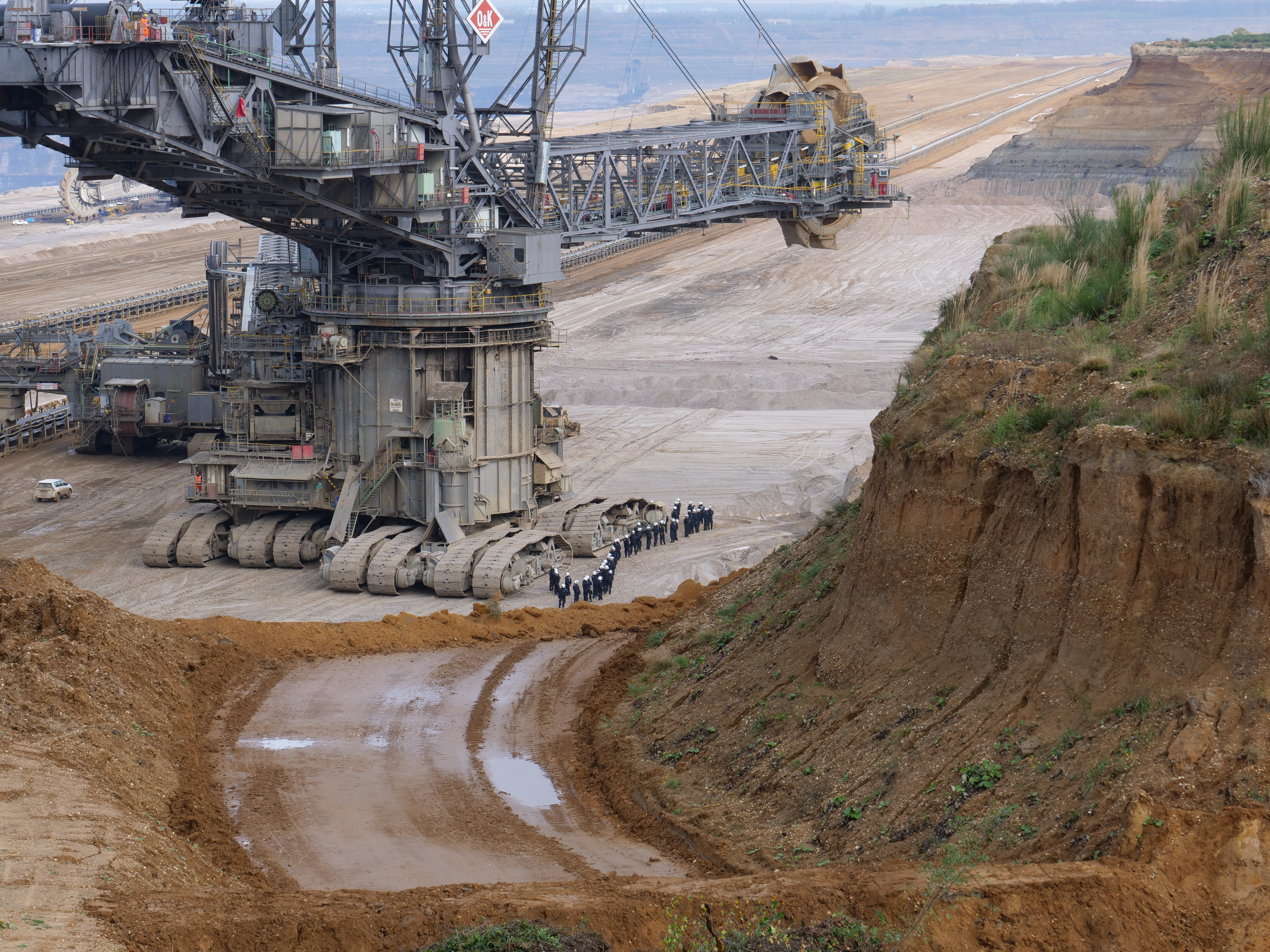
Policemen in front on the giant coal excavator

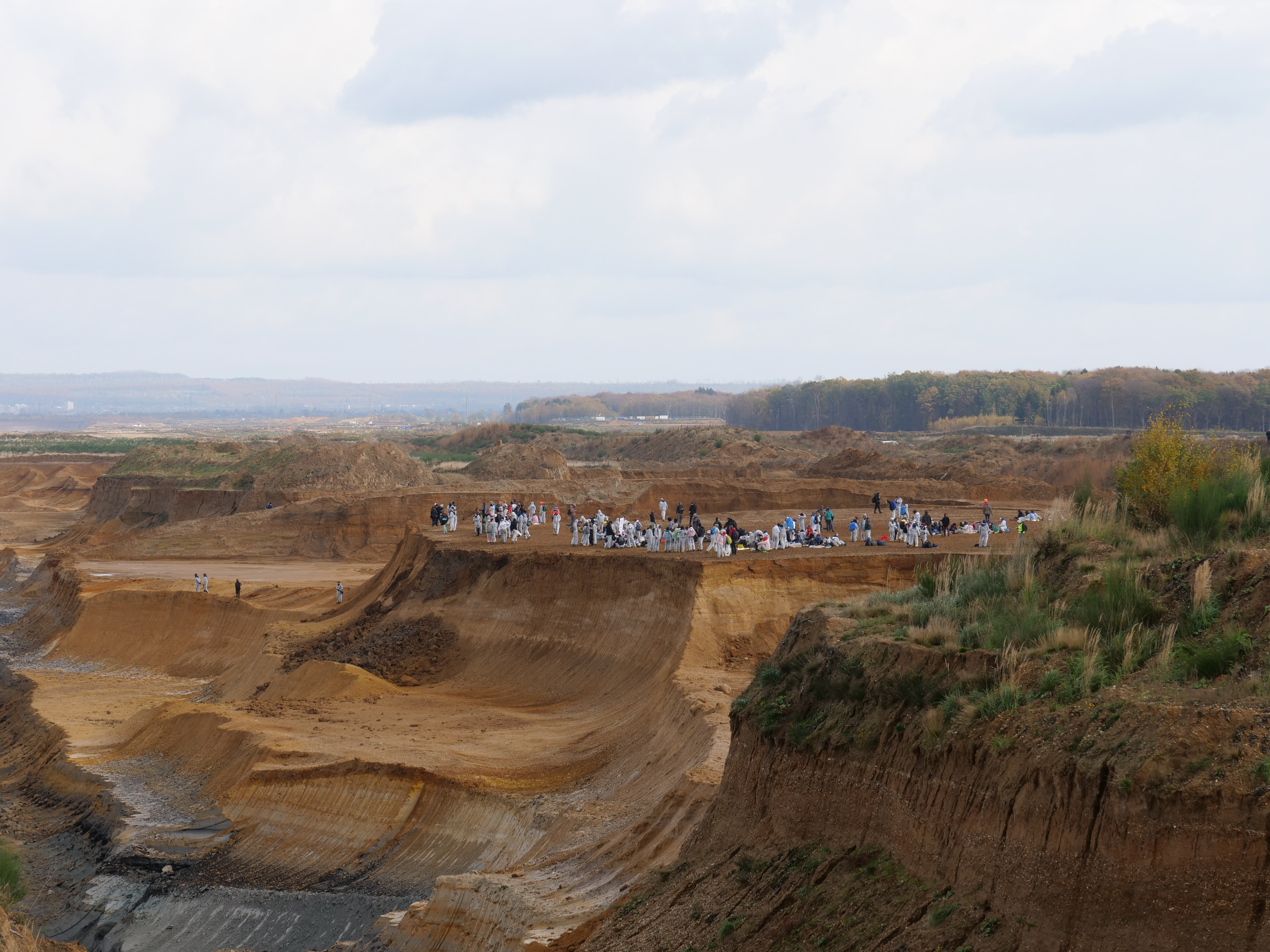
Demonstrators in the mine

== See also ==
- Climate disobedience
- Climate justice
- Energy transition (in Germany)
- Ende Gelände
- Ende Gelände 2016
- Ende Gelände 2018
- Fossil fuel divestment
- Hambach Forest
