= Davide Martello =

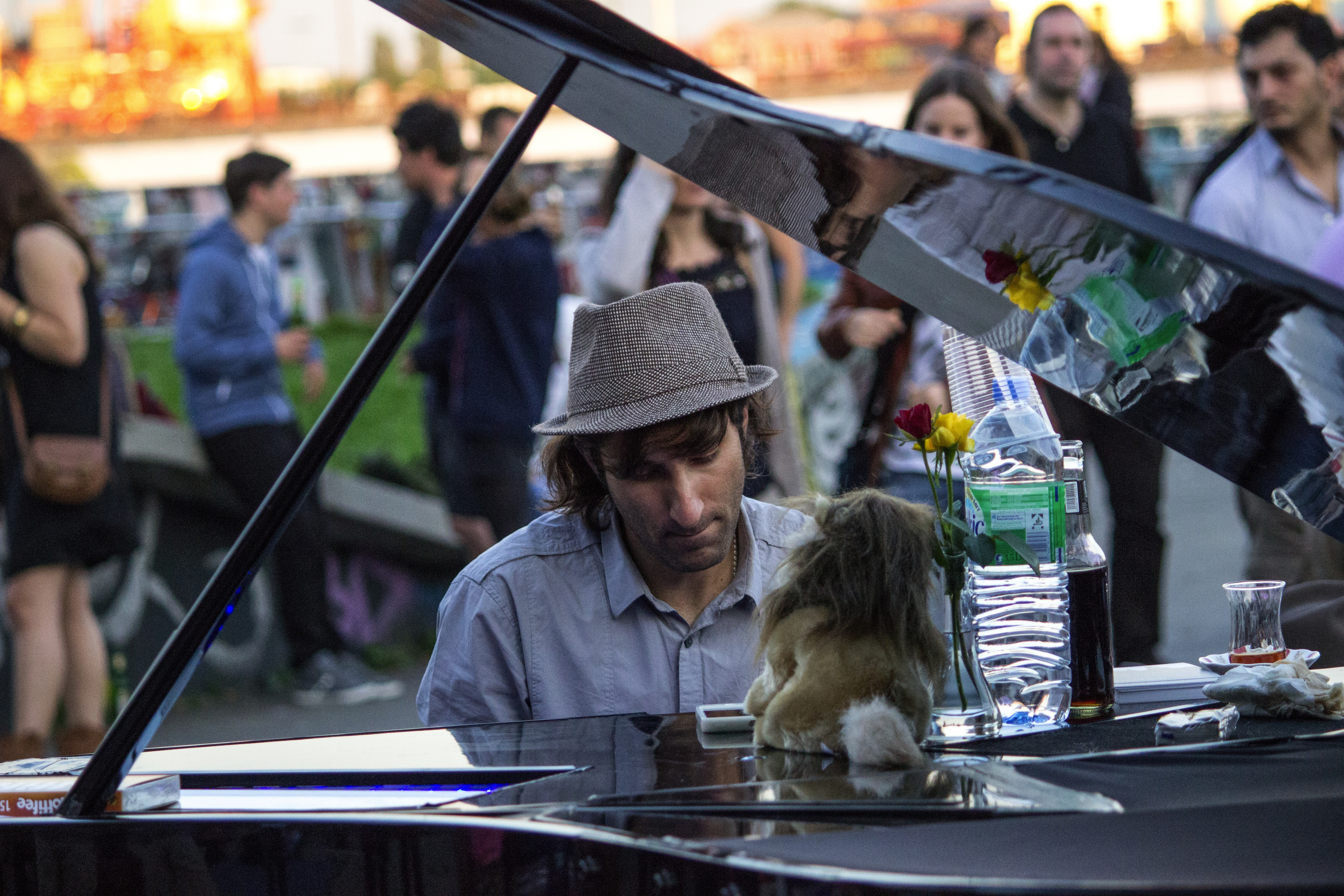
- Martello in Park Fiction, Hamburg, 5 July 2013

Background information
- Also known as: Klavierkunst
- Born: November 1, 1981 (age 45)
- Origin: Lörrach, Germany
- Occupation: Pianist
- Instrument: Piano

Davide Martello, also known as Klavierkunst (born 1 November 1981 in Lörrach in the southwest of Baden-Württemberg), is a German pianist of Italian descent. He was raised in Tuningen, between the Black Forest and the Swabian Jura.

He is known for travelling around conflict zones to play his baby grand piano, which he tows behind his bicycle using a powered trailer. Martello has been recognised by the European parliament for his "outstanding contribution to European cooperation and the promotion of common values". According to his website his aim is to play in every capital of the world.

== Performances ==
Over Christmas 2012 he played in Afghanistan, for the soldiers in Mazar-i-Sharif, Kunduz and Termez (Uzbekistan).

During the Gezi Park protests, in the evening of 12 June 2013, a concert was held in Taksim Square to an audience of thousands, centered on a 14-hour-long piano recital on a grand piano by Martello, on a world tour, on a piano he had built himself. The evening proceeded peacefully without police intervention, though the following day the police confiscated the piano.

He also performed at the Maidan revolution in Kyiv and in Donetsk during the war in Donbas.

In 2015 he performed at the sites of the January 2015 Île-de-France attacks. Later that year in the aftermath of the November 2015 Paris attacks, on 14 November 2015, Martello rode his grand piano by bike to the Bataclan theatre (the venue where 89 people were killed in a terror attack) and started playing "Imagine" from John Lennon in tribute to the victims of the Paris attacks for a crowd gathered outside the hall.

On 6 October 2018 Martello performed at the "Wald retten - Kohle stoppen" demonstration against the cutting of the Hambach Forest to extend the Hambach open pit mine in Germany.

In March 2019, on the way to play at a pier in San Francisco, Martello wrecked his piano on a hill on Bay Street, but was able to mend it sufficiently to play as planned.

In June 2020, he played in Minneapolis, Minnesota during protests after the murder of George Floyd.

In March 2022, he played at the Ukrainian-Polish border with refugees from the Russian invasion.

On 5 April 2025, he played at a protest in Niš, Serbia giving his support to the students in the ongoing country-wide protests. The next day, on 6 April 2025 at 4 AM, police approached him and conveyed to him that he's being deported, allegedly because of misrepresented purpose of the stay.
