= Hambach Forest =

Ancient forest located near Buir in North Rhine-Westphalia, western Germany

Coordinates: 50.9074°N 6.4488°E

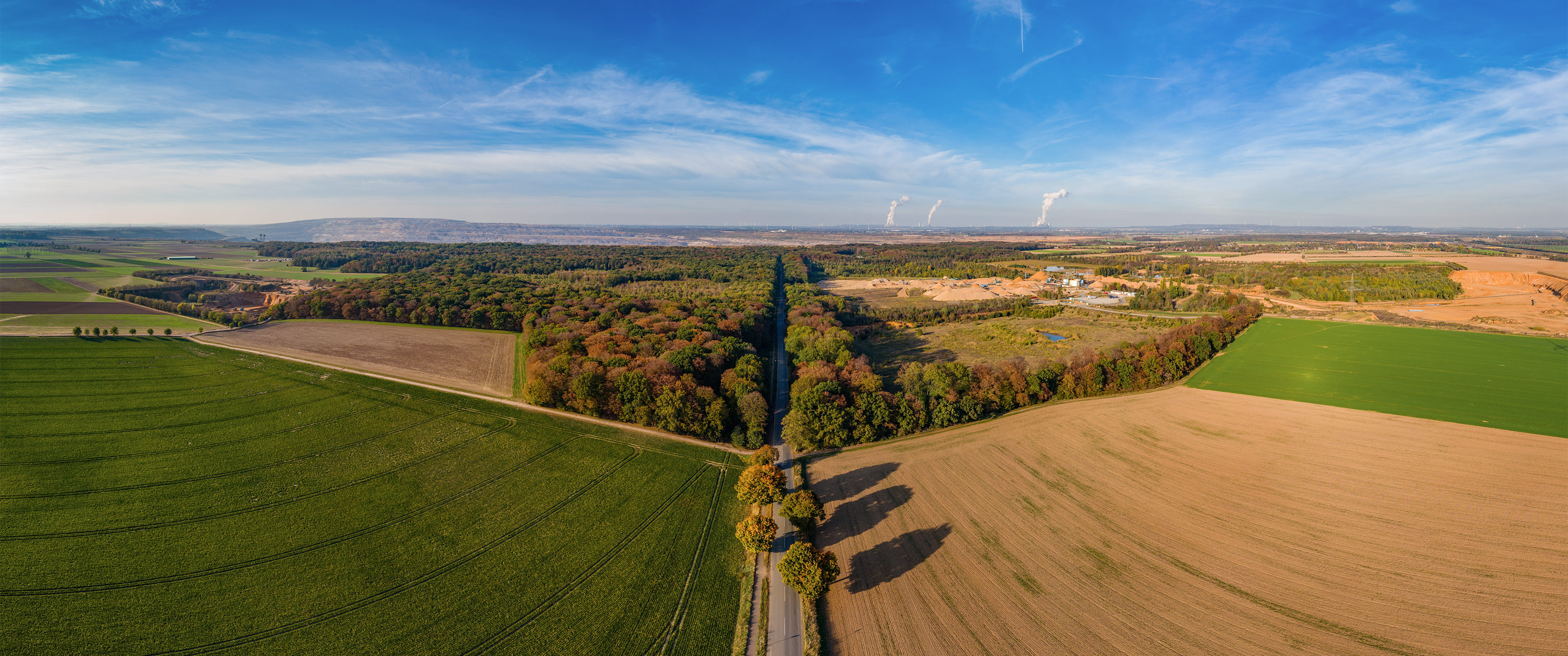
Aerial view of Hambach Forest from the south, October 2018

Hambach Forest (German: Hambacher Wald, Hambacher Forst (German pronunciation: [ˈhambaxɐ ˈfɔʁst]), Bürgewald, Die Bürge) is an ancient forest located near Buir in North Rhine-Westphalia, western Germany, between Cologne and Aachen. It was planned to be cleared as part of the Hambach surface mine by owner RWE AG. There were protests and occupations from 2012 against this, and in 2020 a law was passed to preserve what remains of it.

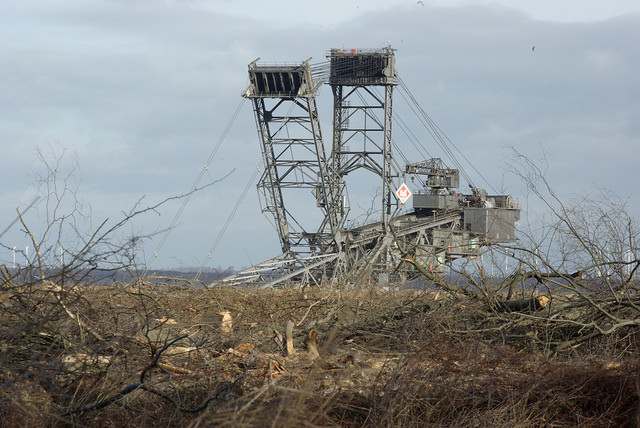
Area of destroyed forest with excavator

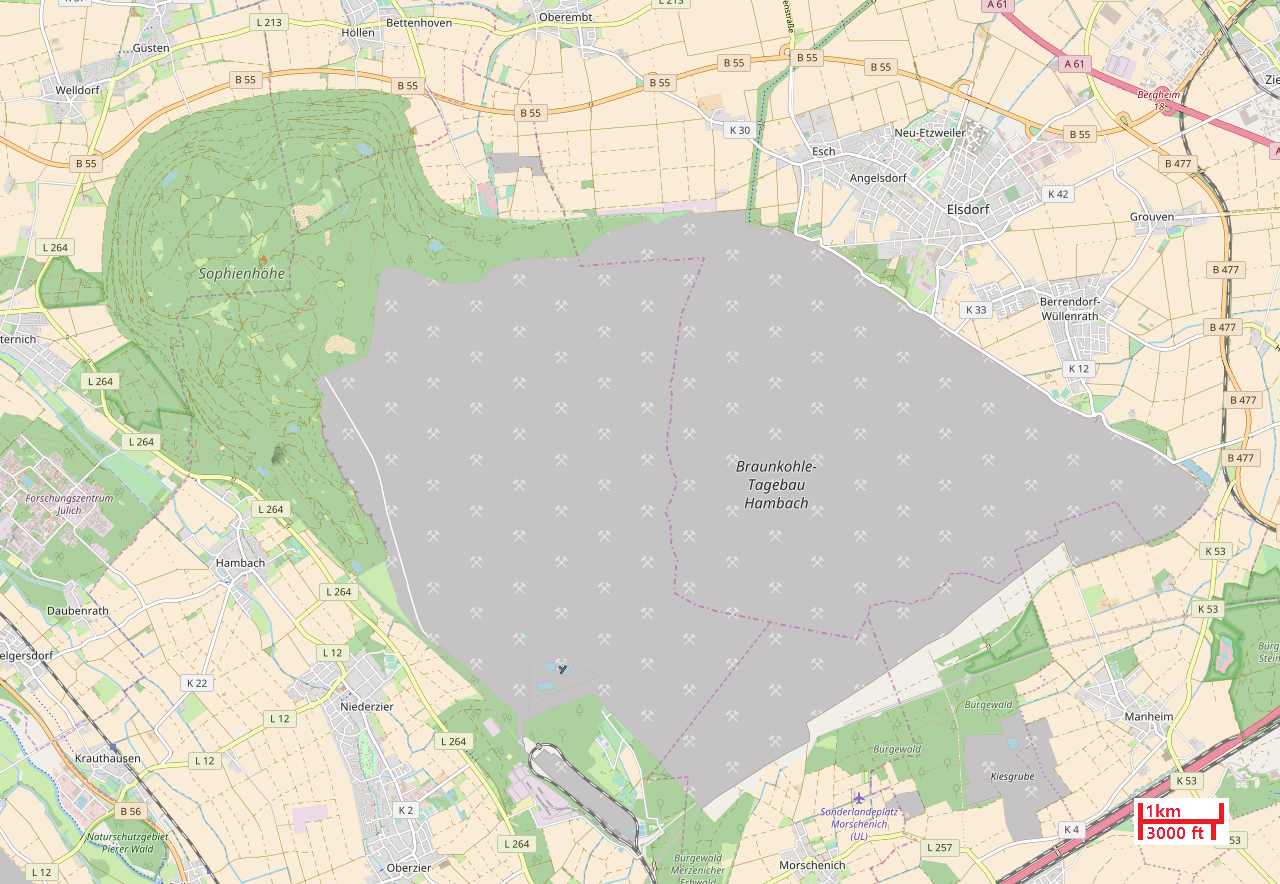
Hambach surface mine (gray); remaining Hambach Forest in the south (NE of Morschenich (de)); recultivated Sophienhöhe in NW, 2017

== The forest ==
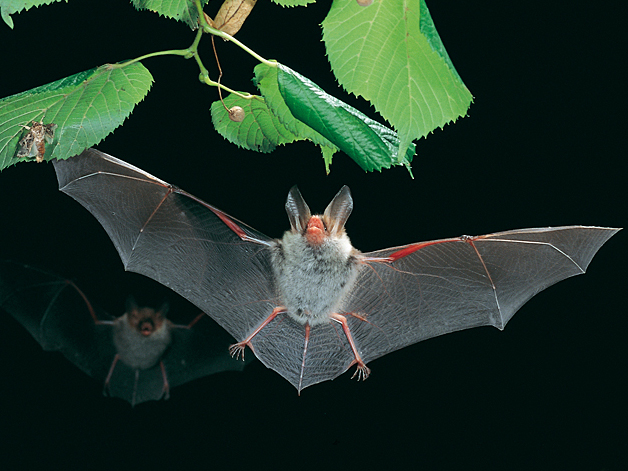
Hambach Forest's rare Bechstein's bat population was threatened.

Hambach Forest is rich in biodiversity and home to 142 species regarded as important for conservation. The forest has been called "the last remnant of a sylvan ecosystem that has occupied this part of the Rhine River plain between Aachen and Cologne since the end of the last ice age". Only ten percent of Hambach Forest still remains, and the remaining forest is severely threatened by mining for brown coal. Of special interest is the rare Bechstein's bat population, which is strictly protected according to annex II and annex IV of the European Habitats Directive. An Environmental Impact Assessment study has never been conducted. The Administrative Court in Cologne denied the necessity of such a study in November 2017 because the permission for the mining operations was given in the 1970s, long before Environmental Impact Assessment studies became mandatory.

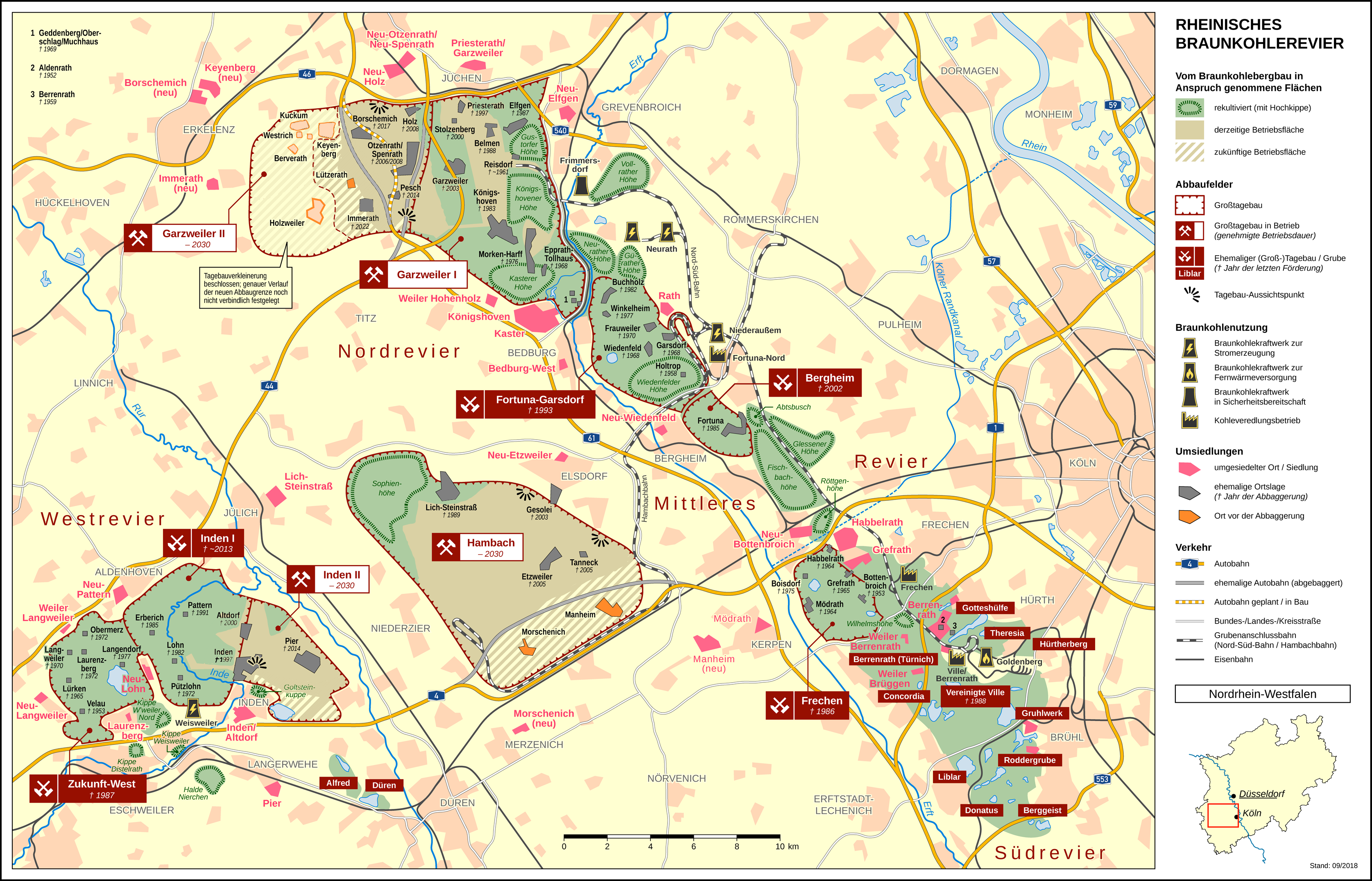
Lignite mining in the area, as of 2018. Hambach pit mine is left of center.

== Lignite mining ==
The area is part of the Rhenish Lignite Mining Area (German: Rheinisches Braunkohlerevier (de)), and the Hambach surface mine is the largest open pit mine in Germany, as of 2018. RWE AG has owned the land since the 1960s or earlier and held an official permit to clear forests in the area since the 1970s. The company repeatedly argued that Hambach Forest must be cleared to ensure future energy supply. RWE spokesperson Guido Steffen stated “I’ve known Hambach for decades, before the mine. It was a great forest ... It’s a pity it must be logged. We’re not doing this because we have fun logging trees, but out of economic necessity. Germany needs energy.”

The usual process is to excavate the lignite/brown coal beneath it with huge excavator machines and then burn it in steam-electric power generation. The 2018 map to the right shows the extent of excavation activities until then. On this map, Hambach Forest (around abandoned old Morschenich) is not displayed at all, but under a hatching meaning "future area of operations".

== First occupations by environmentalists (2012–2014) ==
Since 2012, Hambach Forest had been a political standpoint for environmentalists who protested against the German energy company RWE AG because of the open-pit Hambach surface mine neighboring the site. At 85 square kilometres (33 square miles), the mine is the largest of its kind in Europe.

An area within the forest was occupied by those opposing the clearance for lignite extraction. They sought to close the mine and save the remaining sections of the forest which are under threat of being cut down to allow the expansion of the mine.

The first occupation lasted from April to November 2012. A second occupation started in September 2013 and lasted until March 2014, followed by a third occupation from April to October 2014.

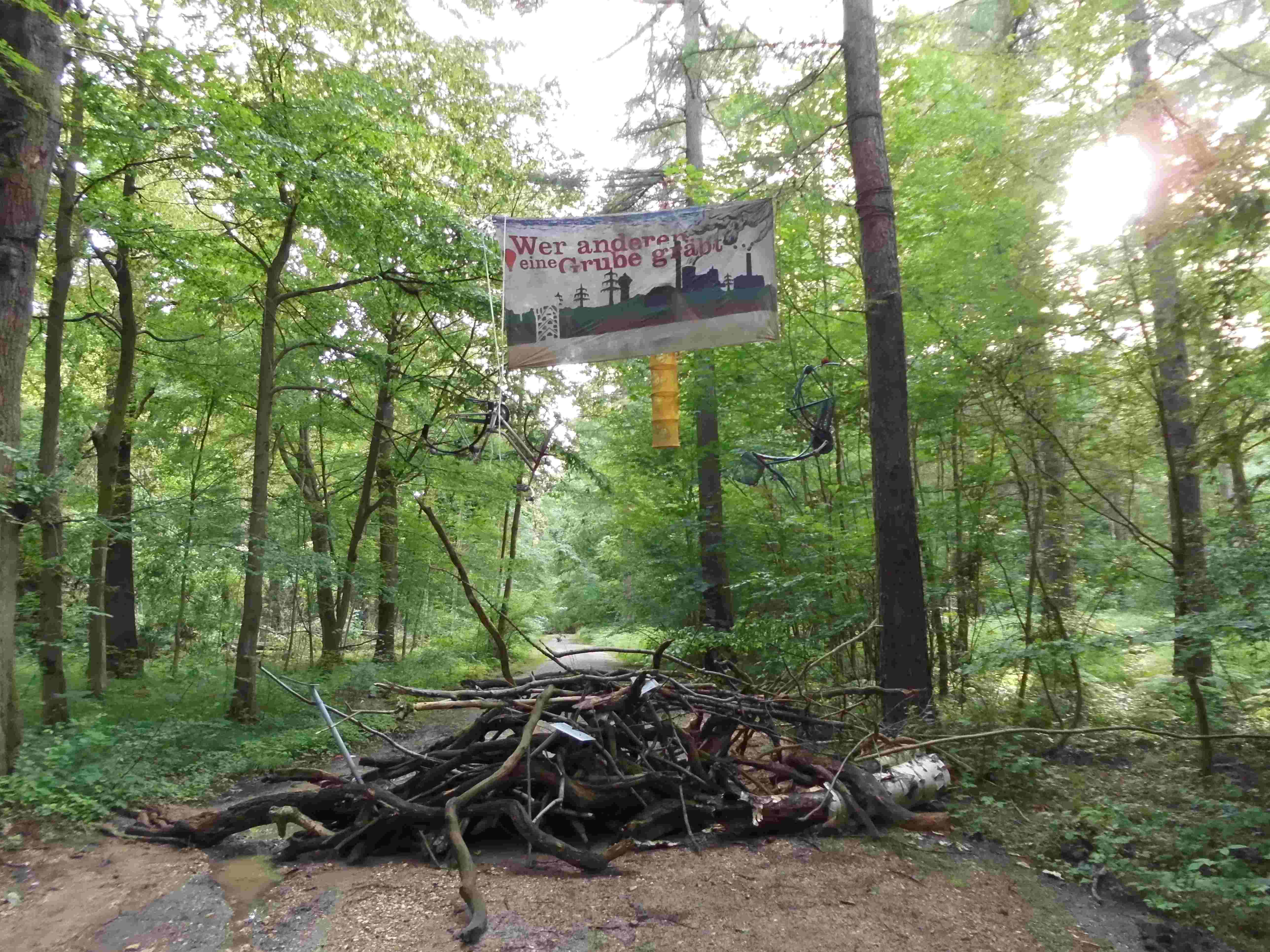
Barricade (September 2016)

== Fourth occupation (2015–2018) ==
The fourth occupation period started in 2015 and lasted until 2018. It involved a settlement with around two dozen tree houses and numerous road barricades. The barricades were erected to prevent mining company and police vehicles from entering.

=== BUND lawsuit and court order ===
Cutting seasons last from 1 October until the end of February and usually 70–80 hectares are cleared in each period. The tree cutting operations in the 2017/2018 cutting season ended after just two days in November 2017, after the Higher Administrative Court in Münster ordered a halt. According to BUND, the environmental protection association that filed the corresponding lawsuit, Hambach Forest, with its common oak, hornbeam and lily of the valley populations, is a habitat of type 9160 of annex I of the European Habitats Directive (Council Directive 92/43/EEC of 21 May 1992). Of special interest in this lawsuit was the Bechstein's bat, which is strictly protected according to annex II and annex IV of the European Habitats Directive.

=== 2018 arrests of activists ===
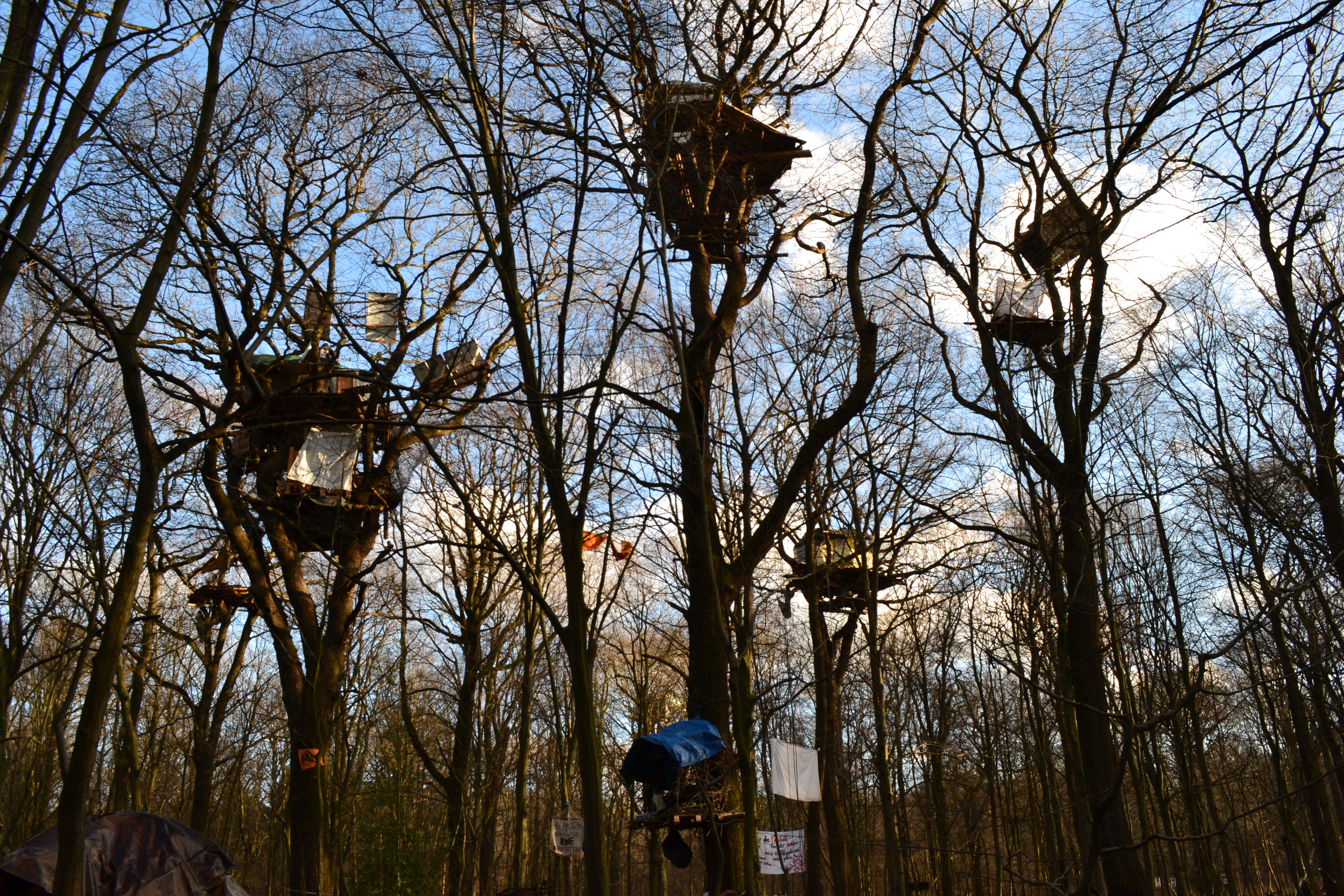
Treehouses in Hambach Forest (February 2018)

On 22 January 2018, nine Hambach Forest activists were arrested for resisting a barricade eviction . All of the arrested refused to give any details about their identities and remained unknown in pretrial detention and also in the courtroom. One activist, who was freed from a lock-on on a tripod, was sentenced to six months on parole after a pretrial detention of 67 days in Cologne-Ossendorf jail. Two activists were released after 52 days in pretrial detention in Cologne-Ossendorf jail after a medical examination revealed that they were likely under 21 years old and should therefore be processed under juvenile law.

A 22-year-old activist from Australia joined the occupation in March 2018 and planned to stay for two weeks in order to take part in a treehouse-building workshop. She was arrested on 19 March, one week after her arrival, after she was identified as being part of a group from whom firecrackers were thrown in the direction of police officers. She decided not to give any personal details and tried to stay anonymous. As a consequence, she was taken into pretrial detention (as "Unknown Person III" [UP III]), thereby missing her flight back home to Australia one week later. According to the prosecutor she was identified one day before her trial, which took place on 31 July 2018. She was sentenced to nine months in prison, without parole. She was released after a court hearing on 4 October.

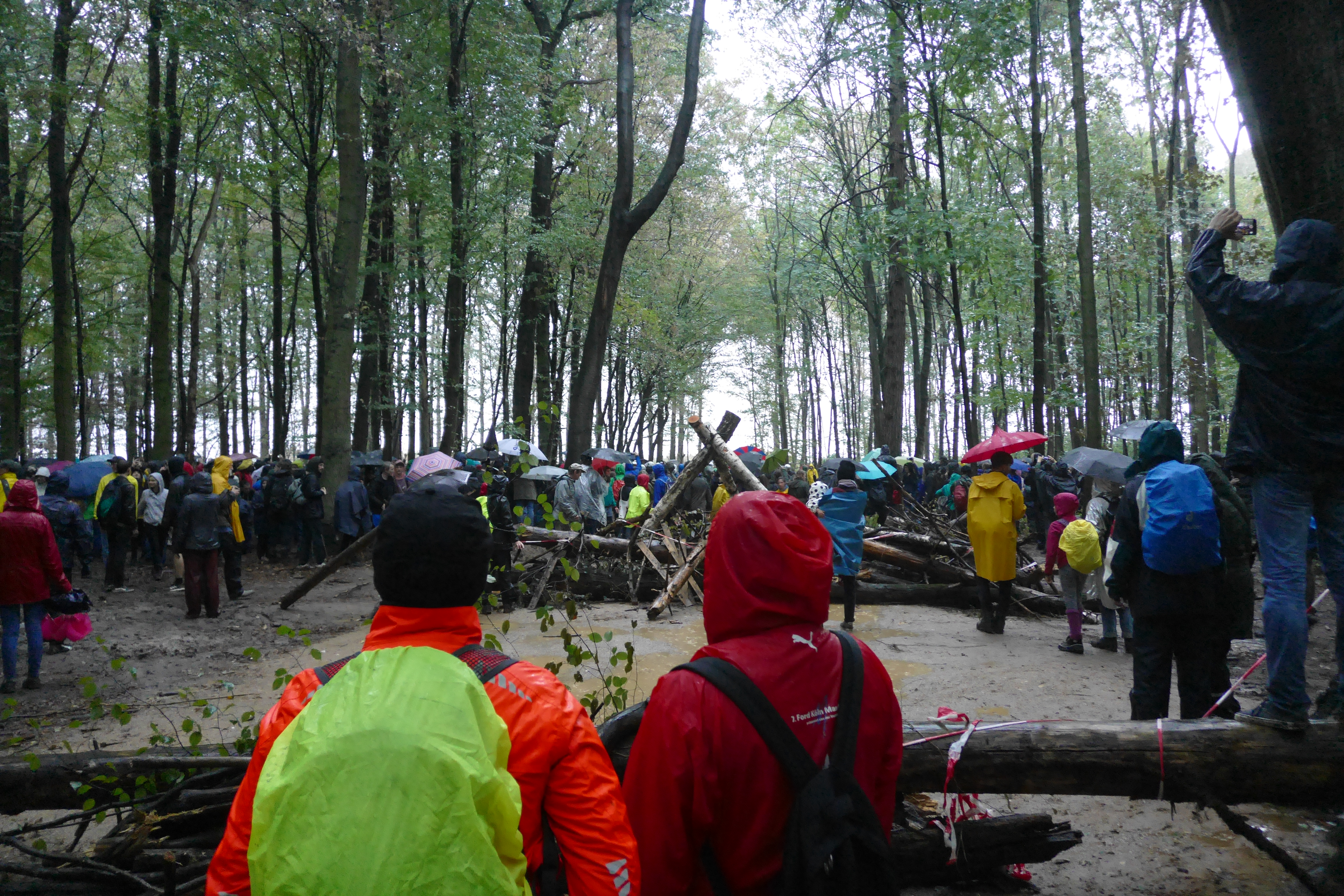
Newly erected barricades (September 2018)

=== Police clearing the tree houses (September 2018) ===
On 13 September 2018 a large scale police operation started initiated by North Rhine-Westphalian Ministry of Construction to evict more than fifty tree houses which existed for up to six years because they didn't comply with fire safety regulation standards. To protect life and limb of the tree house occupants was announced as an important goal of the operation.

=== Journalist falls and dies ===
As evictions continued, on 19 September 2018, the 27-year old artist, blogger and journalist Steffen Meyn fell through a walkway of 15 meters height in the treehouse village of Beechtown and died. Meyn was working on a long-time documentary project of the activities in the Hambach Forest. Immediate resuscitation efforts failed.

The eviction of tree houses was stopped immediately after that incident by Herbert Reul, North Rhine-Westphalia's interior minister. He said "We cannot just proceed as normal — at least I can't."

The eviction proceedings resumed on 23 September 2018. According to a police statement all 86 tree houses had been evicted and destroyed on 2 October 2018.

=== Police clearance ruled illegal ===
A Cologne court ruled on 8 September 2021 that the eviction had been carried out under a false pretext and was therefore illegal. According to the court, the police operation, as authorized by the North Rhine-Westphalia state government, had “pretended” to enforce fire protection rules when the real aim was to clear the protest camp.

== Fifth occupation (2018–2020) ==
=== Court order stops clearance again (October 2018) ===
On 5 October 2018 the Higher Administrative Court (Oberverwaltungsgericht) of Münster ruled that the clearance of Hambach Forest by RWE had to stop immediately until evidence brought by BUND could be evaluated. The evidence in question concerned the threat to the local Bechstein's bat population. The final court decision was expected for 2020. Activists started to build new tree houses again.

=== Large demonstration (October 2018) ===
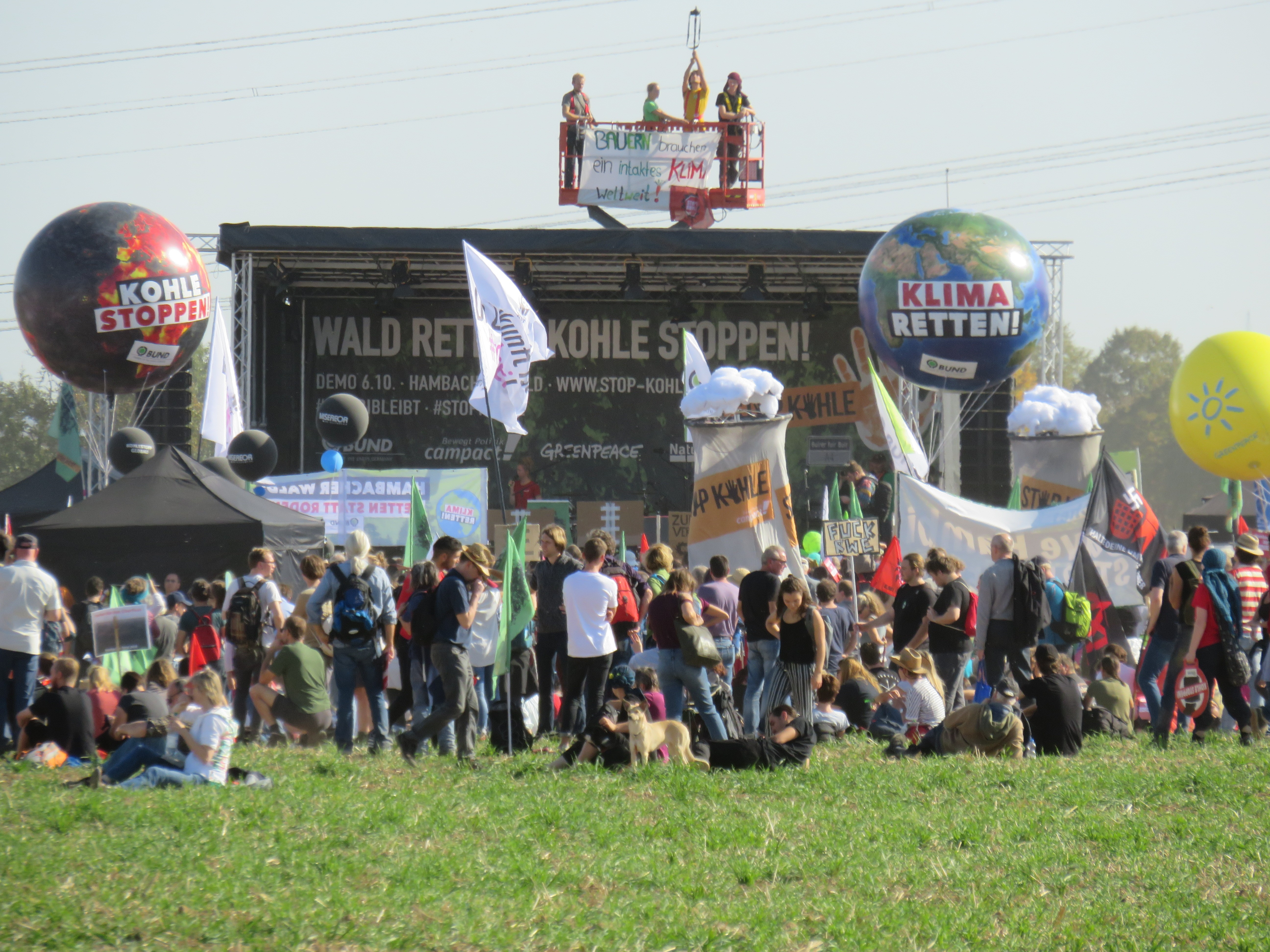
Demonstration Wald retten – Kohle stoppen! near Hambacher Forst (6 October 2018)

On 6 October 2018 there was a large demonstration "Wald retten – Kohle stoppen!" (English: "Save the forest – Stop coal!") near Hambach Forest. It was organized by BUND, Campact, Greenpeace, NaturFreunde Deutschlands (Friends of Nature), the local initiatives Buirer für Buir and Arbeitsgemeinschaft "Bäuerliche Landwirtschaft" (AbL), and others. Originally planned for 5000 people, and with 25000 people anticipated before the event was temporarily forbidden two days earlier, there were 50000 participants according to the organizers; the police acknowledged some 25000 to 30000. The demonstrators celebrated the recent court decision in a peaceful festival atmosphere with many speeches, demanding an end to the use of coal to generate power. Participating speakers included Michael Müller (NaturFreunde Deutschlands), Jens Sannig (pastor), Ulf Allhoff-Cramer (Detmold farmer), Antje Grothus (Buirer für Buir), Hubert Weiger (BUND), Martin Kaiser (Greenpeace), Mamadou Mbodji (NaturFreunde Internationale), Helene Nietert (Camp for Future), Christoph Bautz (Campact), Jochen Flasbarth (BMU), Annalena Baerbock (Bündnis 90/Die Grünen), Bernd Riexinger (Die Linke), Michael Zobel (forest educator), Ingo Bajerke (Keyenberg), Uwe Hiksch (Naturfreunde), and Milan Schwarze (Ende Gelände). Various musicians supported the event with live performances including Eddi Hünecke, Revolverheld, Tonbandgerät, Die Höchste Eisenbahn, Gerd Schinkel, Joe Löhrmann, Davide Martello, and Piri-Piri.

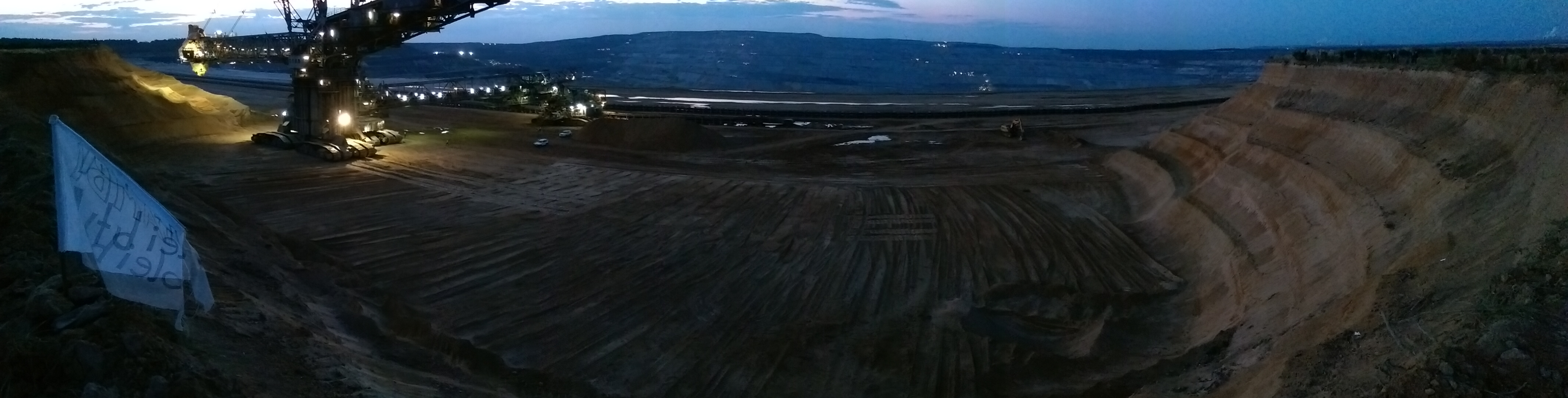
Panorama of Hambach open-pit lignite mine in the neighbourhood of the Hambach Forest showing a protest banner and a bucket-wheel excavator on 6 October 2018

=== 2019 ===
When Greta Thunberg was awarded the Golden Camera Award in March 2019, she dedicated the prize to those protecting the Hambach Forest. She then visited the site, saying "It makes me incredibly sad, to see all this destruction, in this area that used to be a forest ecosystem, and I feel sorry for the people who have to move."

=== 2020 ===
In January 2020, the preservation of the Hambach Forest was agreed at a top-level meeting of the German government and the four federal states affected by the coal phase-out. The "Roadmap for Coal Phase-out" law was passed in July.

== Gallery ==
Views from within Hambach Forest

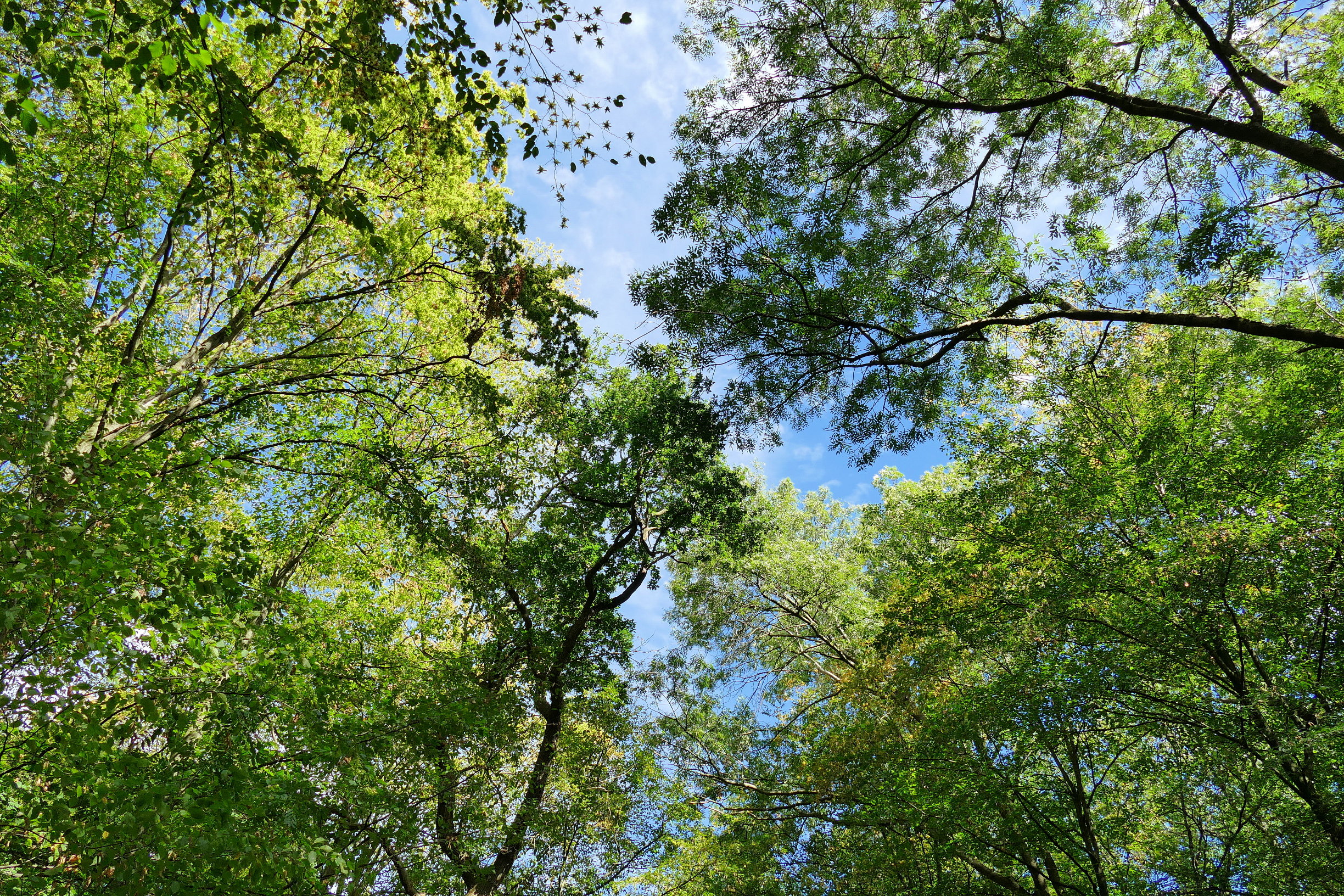
Near Morschenich (de)
September 2018

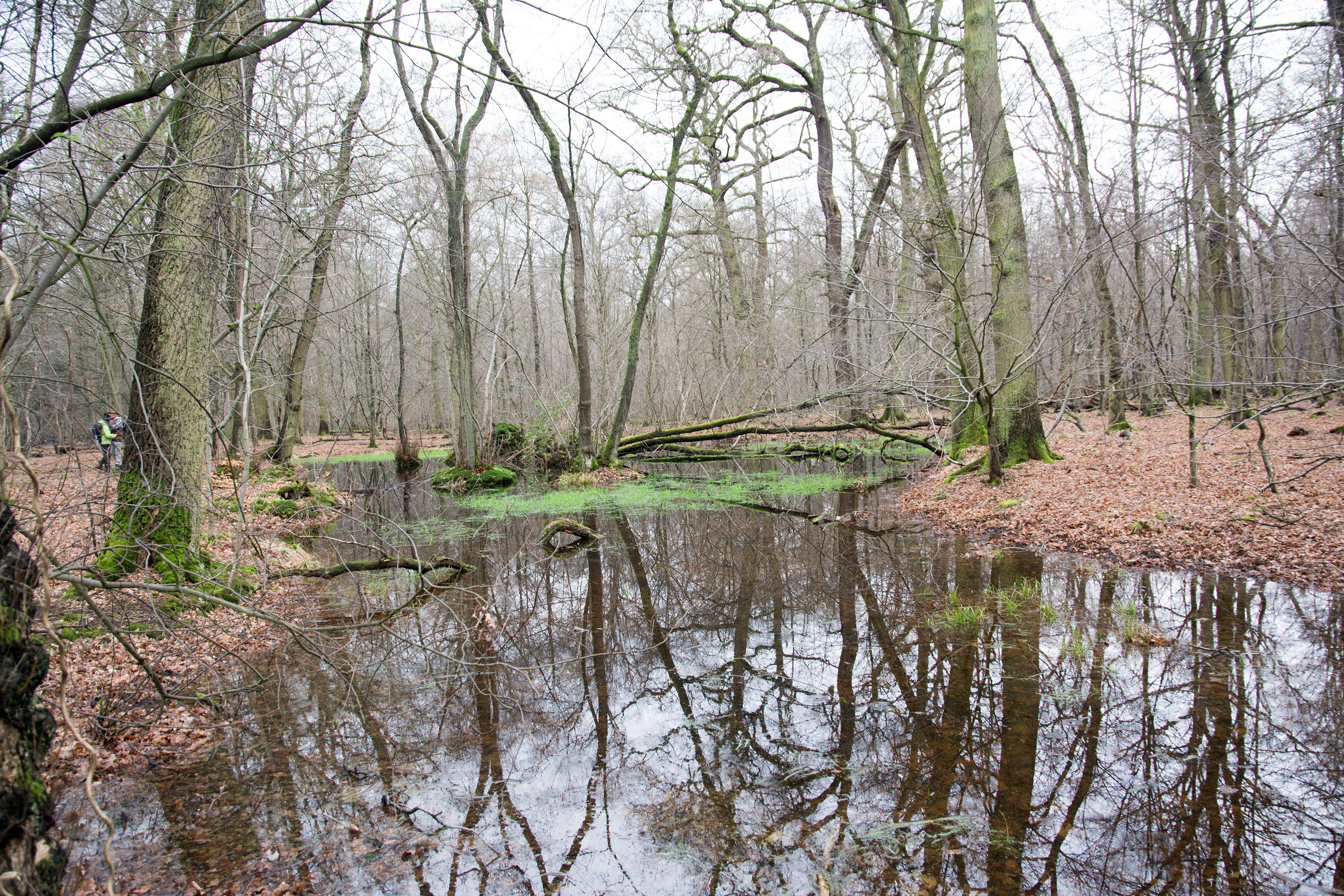
The last pond in Hambach Forest, February 2016

== See also ==
- Ende Gelände 2017
- Ende Gelände 2018
- September 2019 climate strikes
- Morschenich
- Manheim (Kerpen)
- Hambach (Niederzier)
- Arnold of Arnoldsweiler
- Deforestation
- Direct action
- Environmental protection
- Sophienhöhe
- Hambach industrial spur
- Forest in Germany
- Forest protection
- Akbelen Forest forest in Turkey being cut down to make way for lignite mine
- Fossil fuel phase-out
- Commission on Growth, Structural Change and Employment
- Lützerath bleibt!
