= Garzweiler surface mine =

Surface lignite mine in Germany

Garzweiler mine
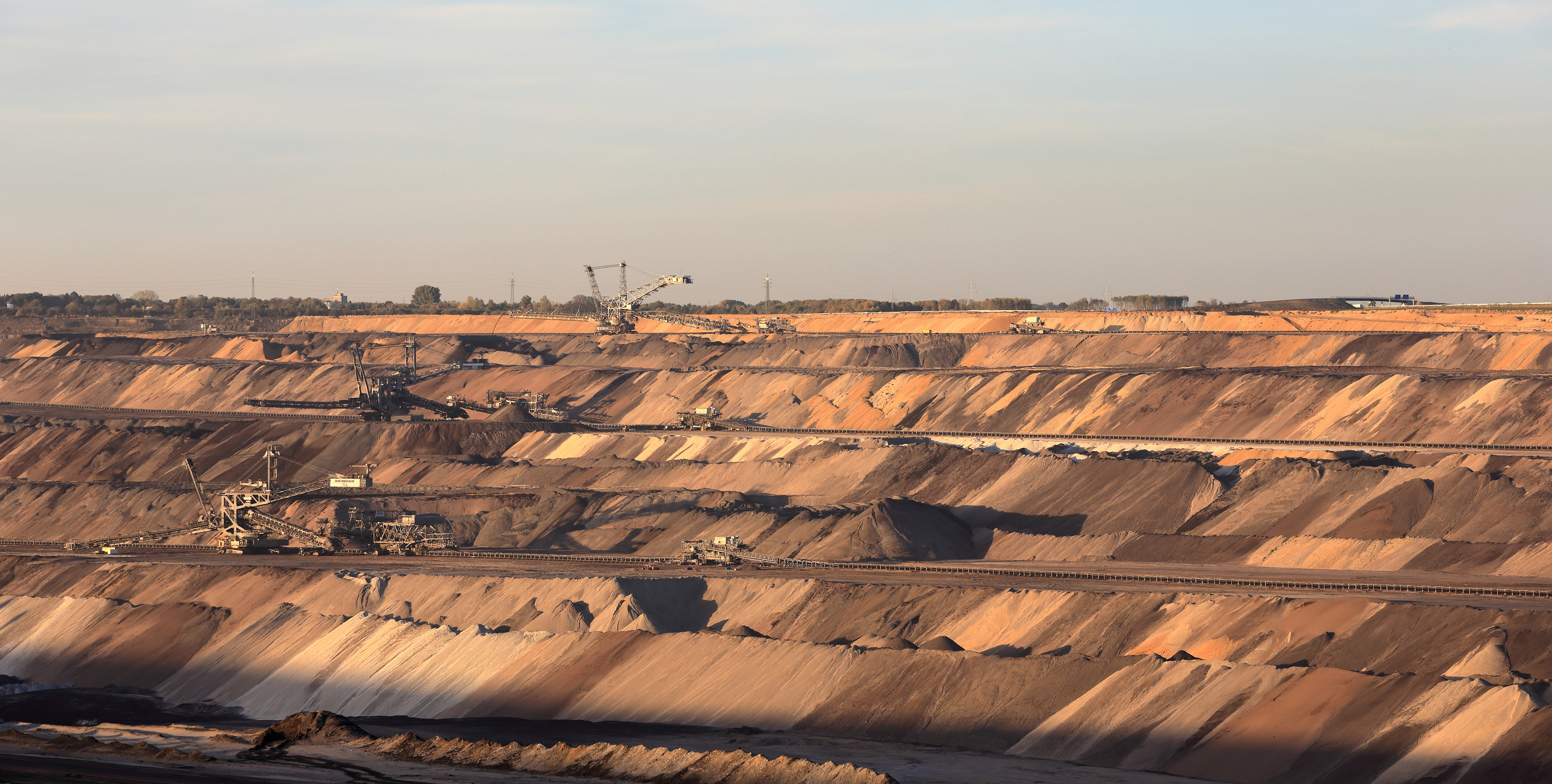
- Panoramic view of Tagebau Garzweiler

- Location within Germany
- Location: Germany; 51°03′15″N 6°30′35″E
- Products: Lignite
- Company: RWE

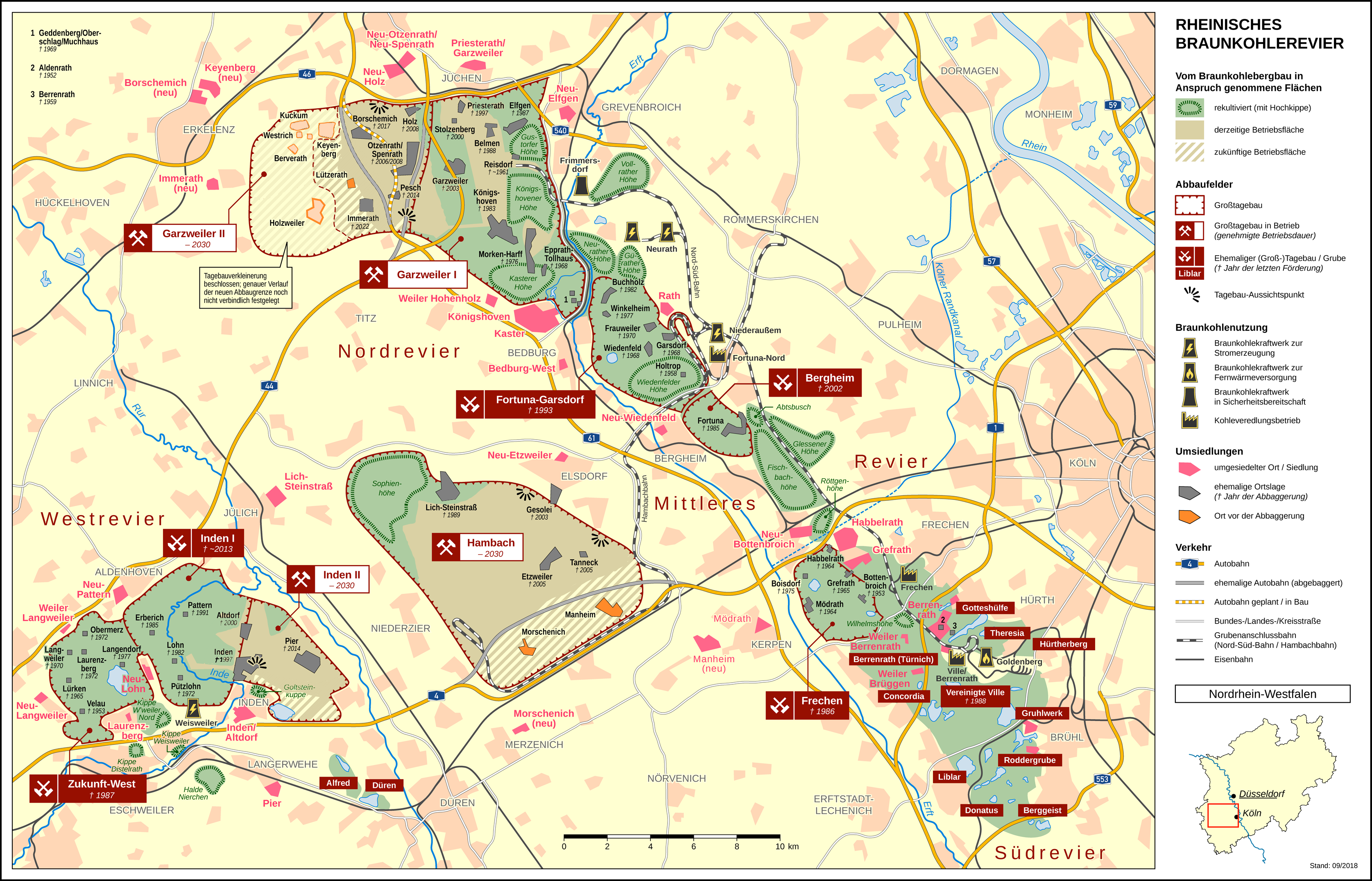
Lignite mines in North Rhine-Westphalia

The Tagebau Garzweiler (German pronunciation: [ˈtaːɡəbaʊ̯ ˈɡaʁt͜sˌʋaɪ̯lɐ]) is a surface mine (German: Tagebau) in the German state of North Rhine-Westphalia. It is operated by RWE and used for mining lignite. The mine currently has a size of 48 km^{2} (19 sq mi) and got its name from the village of Garzweiler which previously existed at this location. The community was moved to a section of Jüchen with the same name.

== The open-pit mine ==
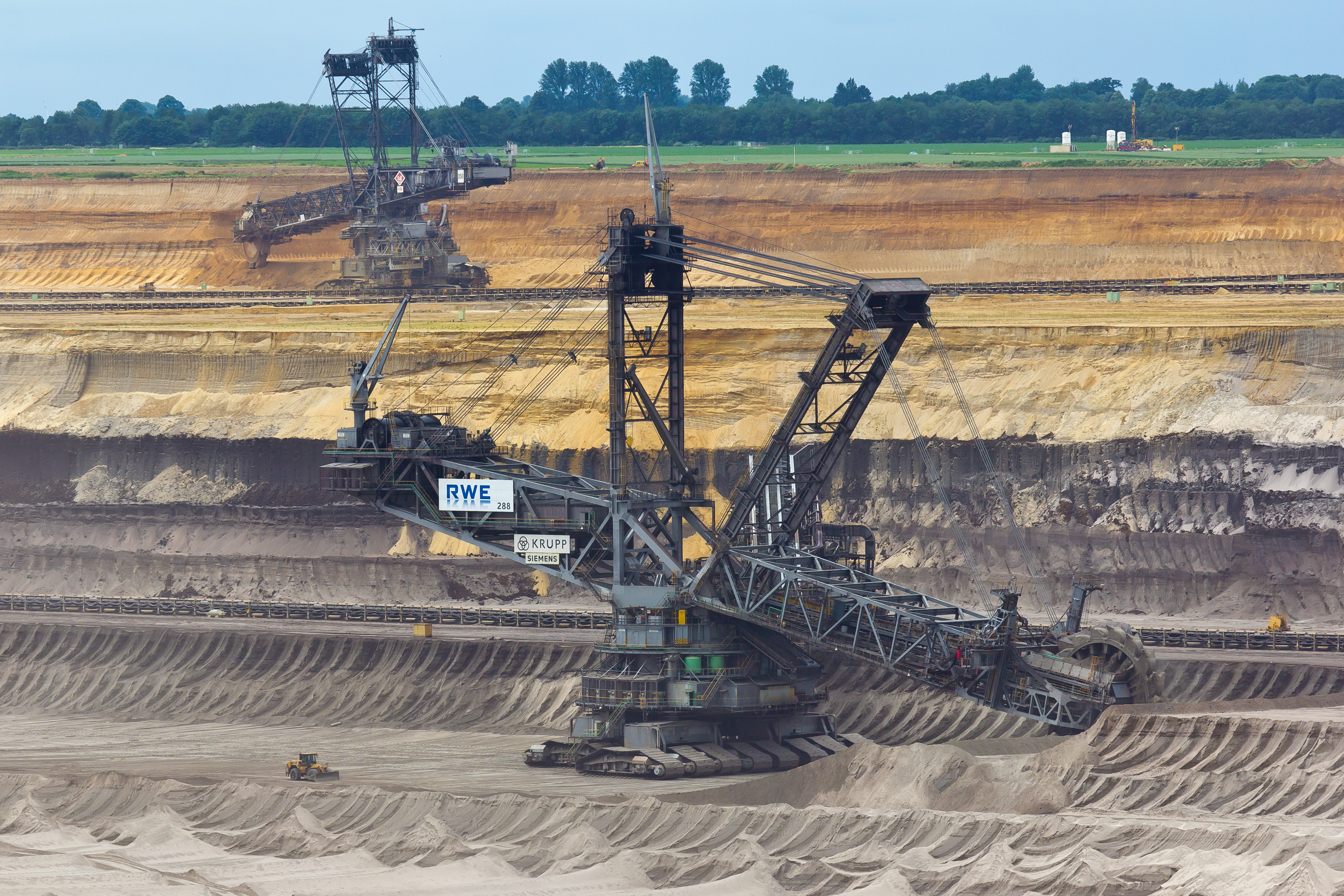
Bucket wheel excavators in Garzweiler surface mine

The mine is located west of Grevenbroich and exploitation is progressing towards Erkelenz. Mining was originally limited to the 66 km^{2} (25 sq mi) Garzweiler I area located east of the A 44 motorway. Mining in the 48 km^{2} (19 sq mi) Garzweiler II area started in 2006 and was estimated to take until around 2045 to fully exploit both sectors. In October 2022, the black-green state government Wüst II and RWE agreed to stop mining lignite at the Garzweiler opencast mine from 2030 onwards. The villages saved by the agreement are to be revitalised; resettlers can buy back houses from RWE.

The lignite is used for power generation at nearby power plants such as Neurath and Niederaußem. In 2015, 1500 protesters took part in civil disobedience against the mine on the basis that it is Europe’s biggest source of CO_{2} emissions. Around 1000 people entered the coal mine and all of the diggers in its pit were brought to a standstill.

It is not yet known what effect the plan to phase out all coal-fired power plants in Germany by 2038 will have on the Garzweiler lignite mine system.

== Traffic ==
The A 44 and A 61 motorways that crossed the planned mine area were affected as well. The A 44 was closed in 2005, dismantled in 2006 and traffic rerouted to the widened A 61 and A 46 motorways. In 2017, as the mine expanded to the west, the A 61 was closed with traffic diverted onto a stretch of newly built A 44n to the east of its original route. As of January 2023, there will be no restoration of previous traffic infrastructure efficiency as stated before, as the part of A 61 which served as connection between two major motorway junctions (Mönchengladbach-Wanlo and Jackerath, respectively) won't be rebuilt after mining efforts are set to come to an end in 2030.

== Displacement of people ==
In the early 1980s, it is estimated that more than 30,000 people had to be moved for the Garzweiler mine. These people had to leave their houses and move. Plans for Garzweiler II required that 12 more towns would have to be removed, with around 12,000 more people being relocated. This has caused many controversies, resulting in residents protesting to save the respective towns from demolition.

== See also ==
- Church of St. Lambertus, Immerath
- Berverath
- Keyenberg
- Lützerath
- Kuckum
- Oberwestrich
- Unterwestrich
- North–South industrial spur
- Ende Gelände 2015
- Ende Gelände 2019
- Inden surface mine
- Hambach surface mine
- Rhenish lignite mining area
- List of lignite mines in Germany
- List of active mines in Germany
- Commission on Growth, Structural Change and Employment
