= Sophienhöhe =

Artificial hill in North Rhine-Westphalia, Germany

Coordinates: 50°56′14″N 6°26′57″E

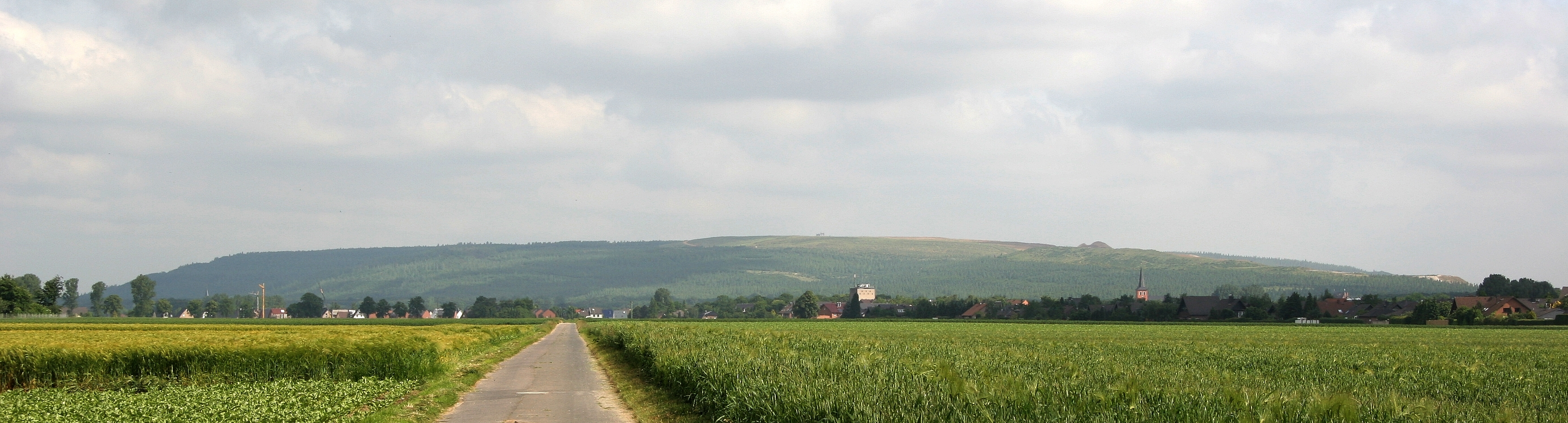

The Sophienhöhe (301.8 m AMSL) is the largest artificial hill worldwide, created by surface mining at the open cast lignite mine Tagebau Hambach operated by RWE Power AG in Düren (district), North Rhine-Westphalia, Germany.

== Location ==
Sophienhöhe is about 6 km east of the city centre of Jülich, bordering Niederzier and Titz at the north-end of the open pit Tagebau Hambach. The distance (in respect to sea-level) between the top of Sophienhöhe and the lowest point of the pit is 594.8 meters. Tagebau Hambach is the lowest surface point in Europe, lying 293 meters below sea level. The CIA still maintains that Neuendorf bei Wilster is Germany's lowest point.

The highest points of Sophienhöhe are Höller Horn (291.5 m AMSL), Jülicher Kopf (285.8 m AMSL) and the Roman Tower (301.8 m AMSL).

== See also ==
- List of mountains and hills in North Rhine-Westphalia
- Hambach Forest
- Morschenich
- Manheim (Kerpen)
