= Friends of Nature =

Non-Profit pro-nature organisation

- Naturfreunde International
- Abbreviation: NFI
- Formation: 1895; 131 years ago
- Founded at: Vienna, Cisleithania, Austria-Hungary
- Website: nf-int.org/en

Friends of Nature (international abbreviation: NFI, for German: Naturfreunde International) is a non-profit organisation with a background in the social democratic movement, which aims to make the enjoyment of nature accessible to the wider community by providing appropriate recreational and travel facilities. It encourages sustainable tourism and international friendship.

It is also known as Naturfreunde (German), Les Amis de la Nature (French), Amici della Natura (Italian), La Naturamikoj (Esperanto), and Natuurvrienden or NIVON (Dutch).

== Background ==
The International Friends of Nature (IFN), based in Vienna, is the umbrella organisation of the national Friends of Nature federations.

Publications of the various sections include a handbook detailing all the houses and magazines published by various sections (such as Naturefriends - Great Britain - Bulletin, Les Amis de La Nature, La Migranto – in Esperanto by "Esperantistoj Naturamikoj" etc.).

=== Tradition ===
The Friends of Nature organisation was founded in Vienna in 1895. The group was founded by three activists, Karl Renner, a law student and future President of Austria, Georg Schmiedl, a schoolteacher, and Alois Rohrauer, a blacksmith. In the age of incipient tourism, the organisation succeeded in making nature accessible to broader population strata by providing requisite recreational and travel facilities.

The organisation was banned by the Nazis in 1933, but revived in 1945 after the Second World War.

=== Commitment to sustainable development ===
International environmental campaigns, such as "100,000 Trees for Europe" or "Blue Rivers for Europe" are intended to enhance environmental awareness in Europe and to offer members opportunities to take action in the interest of the environment. In 1995, the Friends of Nature set up the "Institute for Integrative Tourism". The "Manifesto for a New Europe" (1993) and the "Manifesto for a Social, Ecological and Peaceful Future" (1996) proposals submitted to the Inter-governmental Conference of the European Union, and the "Green Paper - The Alps" are examples of international lobbying by the Friends of Nature.

=== Friends of Nature worldwide ===
With 350,000 members organised in approximately 45 member organisations, the Friends of Nature are among the biggest non-profit and non-governmental organisations worldwide. They provide environmentally sound travel programmes for their members and run over 700 Nature Friends Houses mainly in Europe. The houses vary in size and facilities.

=== Nature Friends Los Angeles ===
Nature Friends Los Angeles was founded in 1920 in Sierra Madre, California. Nature Friends members, some of whom were immigrants from Germany and Hungary, completed building the chalet style clubhouse in 1923. The original building had only two stories. A dance hall was added in 1927. The site served as a nature sanctuary, retreat center, community resource and welcoming garden. In 2025, the Eaton Fire destroyed more than 9,400 structures, and Nature Friends LA was completely lost. "The site of weddings, socials and classes, the volunteer-based organization is fundraising to build a new center.”

=== International Young Nature friends ===
In the 1970s, a group of young members of four Nature friends' organisations (Germany, Austria, Switzerland and the Netherlands) created a youth umbrella to network and support youth work in the movement. The organisation was formalised and has extended to current 26 member and partner organisations. The organisation was officially funded in 1975 with the first Secretary General Jochem Zimmer from Germany.

The International Young Nature friends (IYNF) cooperated and were supported by the Council of Europe's Directorate Youth and Sport. In 2002, after more than ten years of seating in Brussels, the office of IYNF was moved to Prague, Czech Republic where the Secretariat of IYNF is currently located.

IYNF is a founding member of the European Youth Forum where Young Nature friends belonged to the socialist family or the family of non-formal education organisations.

International Young Nature friends provides trainings and international activities to the members of its network on different topics every year. They are also active in international conference such as the COP of the UNFCCC, actively lobbying for the interests of the young people of both Europe and beyond, concerned with environmental issues, social justice and the climatic change.

=== Accommodation ===
The movement quickly spread across Europe. As it was founded with the goal of making outdoor recreation accessible to all, particularly working-class families, while emphasizing environmental conservation and sustainable tourism.

The houses serve as affordable accommodation options for hikers, cyclists, and other outdoor enthusiasts. They are hubs for environmental education, cultural exchange, and collective outdoor experiences.
