= Earth Strike =

Climate activist movement

- Earth Strike logo (match with leaf)
- Formation: 10 November 2018; 7 years ago
- Purpose: Form a general strike to protest political inaction on climate change
- Location: International
- Fields: Labor movement Environmental movement

Earth Strike was an international grassroots movement calling for a global general strike for climate action. Their aim was a global general strike on 27 September 2019. The Earth Strikes were part of the worldwide September 2019 climate strikes, which gathered millions of protesters.

The movement has had public support from organizations including Extinction Rebellion and Fridays for Future, as well as public figures including Noam Chomsky.

== History ==
=== Foundation ===
Earth Strike was founded on 10 November 2018 after a user on the subreddit r/Chomsky called for a "General Strike to Save The Planet". The post quickly gathered attention within Reddit, and the r/EarthStrike subreddit was formed to organise a general strike. The initial protests were held on 15 January 2019, with 27 September being announced as the date for the "Earth Strike". General strikes in Iceland in 1975 and India in 2019 were cited as inspirations.

=== Days of action ===
- 19 July 2019 - Youth Strike for Climate
- August 2019 - Climate protest
- September 2019 climate strikes

=== September 2019 global climate strikes ===
The September 2019 global climate strikes took place on 20 and 27 September 2019. An estimated 6 million people participated in strikes worldwide. The protests were organised by a broad coalitions of movements and organisations internationally, including Earth Strike, Fridays For Future, 350.org, and various trade unions. The protests included school strikes, labour strikes, and street protests and rallies.

== See also ==
- Earth Day
- Earth Hour
- Ecotax
- Environmentalism
- Extinction Rebellion
- Green ban
- Green economy
- Green growth
- Green politics
- Green recovery
- Just Transition
- School strike for climate
