= Hambach surface mine =

Open-pit coal mine in North Rhine-Westphalia, Germany

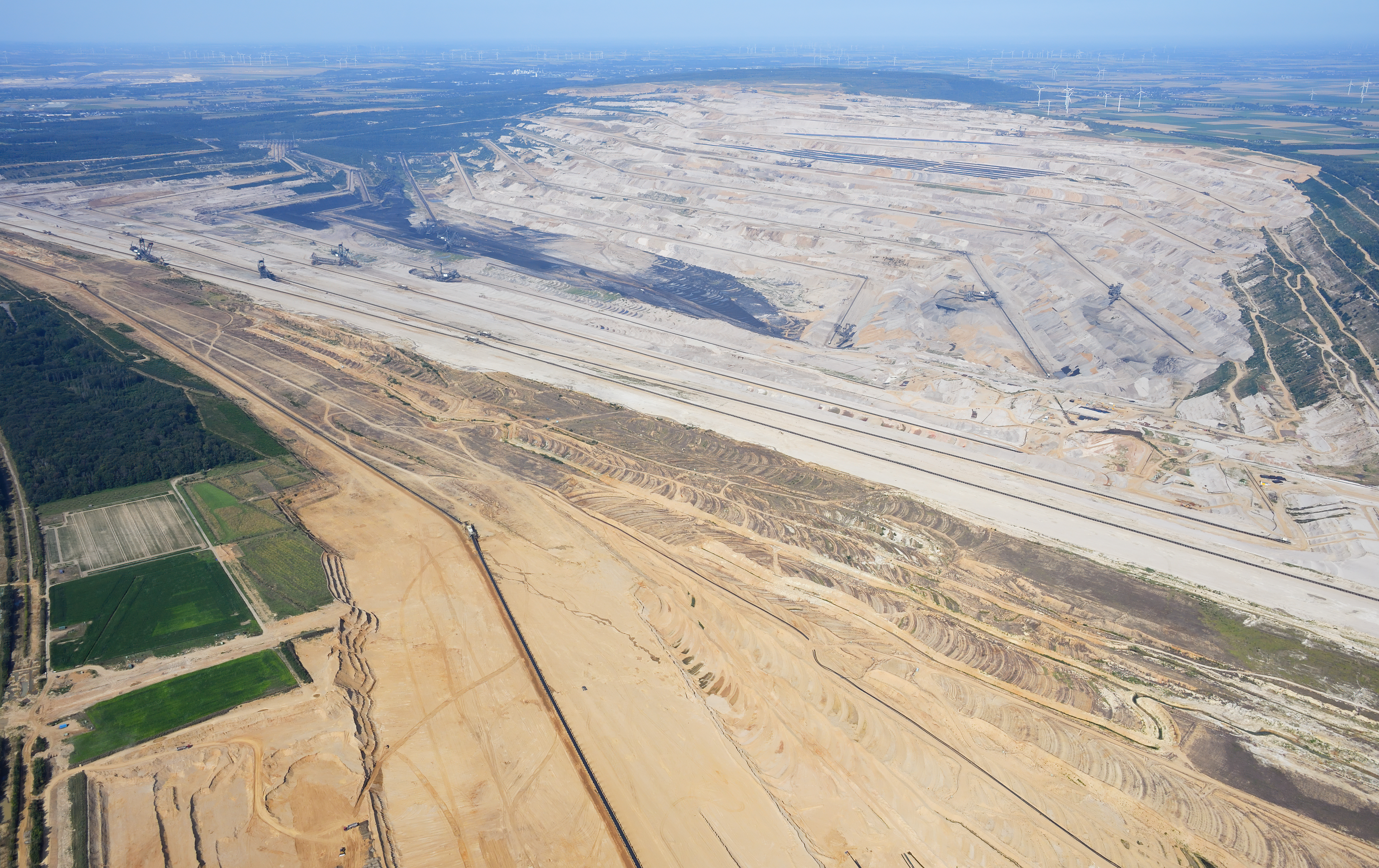
- Aerial view of Hambach surface mine
- Interactive map of Hambach surface mine
- Location: Niederzier and Elsdorf, North Rhine-Westphalia, Germany; 50°54′39″N 6°30′10″E
- Products: Lignite
- Type: Open-pit
- Opened: 1978
- Closed: 2029 (planned)
- Company: RWE

The Tagebau Hambach is a large open-pit coal mine (German: Tagebau) in Niederzier and Elsdorf, North Rhine-Westphalia, Germany. It is operated by RWE and used for mining lignite.

The mine is on the site of the ancient Hambach Forest, which was purchased by RWE in 1978. The company then cut most of the forest down and cleared it to mine. Only 10% of the forest area remains. RWE planned to clear half of the remaining area between 2018 and 2020. This plan was met with massive protests in the autumn of 2018 and was temporarily stopped in October 2018 by the supreme administrative court of North Rhine-Westphalia (Oberverwaltungsgericht für das Land Nordrhein-Westfalen).

Having begun in 1978, the mine's operation area currently (as of end of 2017) has a size of 43.8 km^{2}, with the total area designated for mining having a size of 85 km^{2}. It is the deepest open pit mine in relation to sea level: the bottom of the pit, with up to 500 metres (1,640 ft) from the surface, is 299 metres (981 ft) below sea level, the deepest artificially made point in both North Rhine-Westphalia and the entire European Union.

The mine ceased expansion in 2020 following a government agreement to preserve the adjacent forest. RWE continues extraction within the existing boundaries, with full cessation of lignite mining planned by 2030 as part of Germany's coal phase-out. The site is being gradually transformed into a reclaimed landscape, including the future Hambach lake.

== Data ==
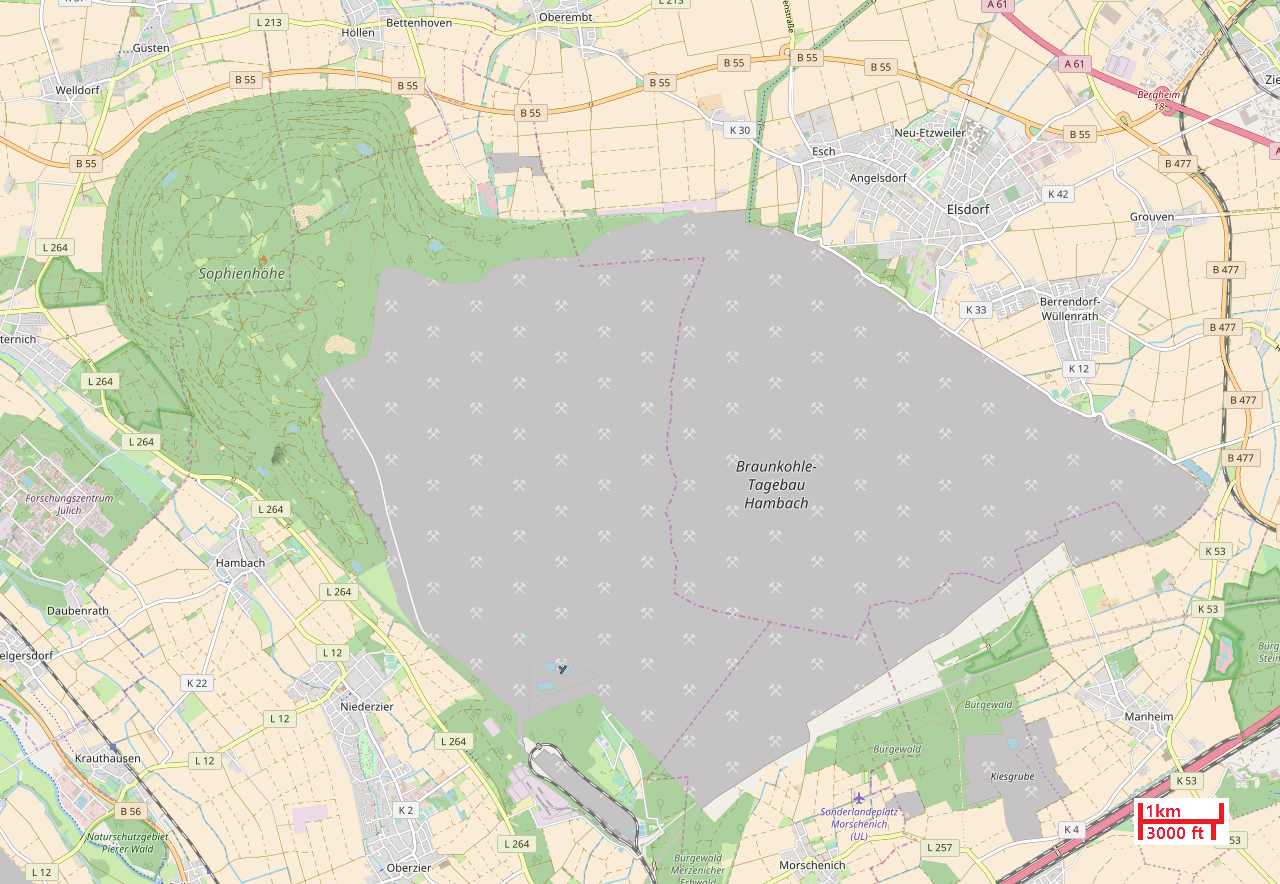
Hambach surface mine (grey), recultivated area adjacent (above to the left), remaining Hambach Forest (below to the right, "Bürgewald")

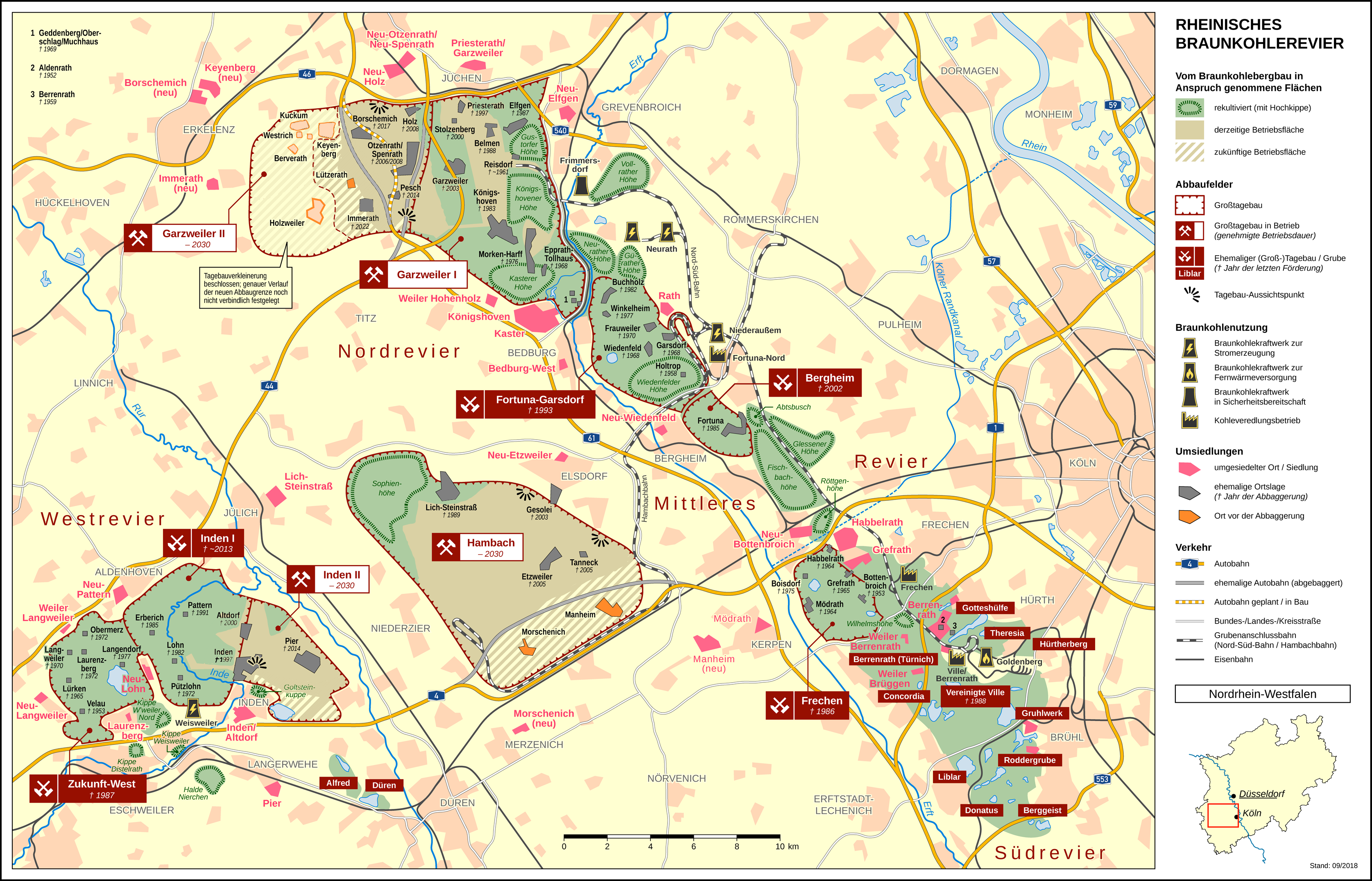
Lignite mines in North Rhine–Westphalia

The open pit operator RWE, then known as Rheinbraun, initiated the permitting process for open-pit mining in 1974 and was able to commence operations in 1978. The first excavator began its work on 15 October 1978. This was accompanied by the resettlement of local villages and towns and the largest forest area in the region, the Hambach Forest, was largely cleared. On 17 January 1984, the first brown coal was mined.

Hambach is the largest open-pit mine in Germany, with an area of 3,389 hectares (as of 2007), with an approved maximum size of 8,500 hectares. About forty million tons of lignite are produced annually in this mine. It has recently been estimated that 1,772 million tons of lignite are still available for mining. The lignite was created from extensive forests and bogs, which developed in the Lower Rhine Bay between thirty and five million years ago. The geology of the Lower Rhine Bay is characterized by long-lasting subsidence movements in the last thirty million years, which led to the deposition of up to 1,300 m-thick sediment layers through the North Sea and many rivers. This today consists of lignite seams up to 100 m thick.

At 299 m below sea level, the deepest point of the Hambach open-pit mine forms the deepest artificial depression in North Rhine-Westphalia and the European Union.

Since 1995, the giant bucket-wheel excavator Bagger 293 is used to remove the overburden. It holds several Guinness world records for terrestrial vehicles.

The open-cast mine annually produces a spoil amount of 250 to 300 million m³. The ratio of overburden to coal is 6.2:1. The extracted lignite is transported via the Hambach industrial spur to Bergheim-Auenheim, and from there via the North–South industrial spur to the power stations at Niederaussem, Neurath, Frimmersdorf, and Goldenberg, near Hürth-Knapsack. The overburden was, until 16 April 2009, partially transported by conveyor belt to the Bergheim mine, which has run out of coal and therefore been refilled and recultivated. The visible mark of the open pit is the Sophienhöhe spoil tip, which is considered to be the largest human-made hill, towering over the flat landscape by 200 metres.

From 2013, the open-pit area is to be extended southeast. For this, the villages of Morschenich and Manheim must be relocated. The A4 motorway and the Hambach industrial spur, by which the lignite is transported to the power stations, were laid around three kilometres to the south, parallel to the Cologne-Aachen railway line. In addition, a small piece of the federal highway 477 was moved east.

== Subsequent use ==
=== Lake ===
The open-pit mine was put into operation in 1978. Every year, about 0.3 cubic kilometres of material are moved, so that coal and soil with a volume of about 18.6 km^{3} will be mined by the time the coal runs out in 2040. By April 2009, the overburden was being transported by conveyor belt to refill the now-exhausted Bergheim mine. Due to the accumulation of about 1 km^{3} of material at the Sophienhöhe and the extracted coal, a residual hole was created, which is set to be filled with water after the completion of mining activities.

=== Pumped-storage plant ===
In addition to complete flooding, construction of a pumped-storage power plant is also an option on the site. A patent from 1995 states that such a pumped-storage plant in the Hambach open-cast mine can be realized and can provide many times the pumped-storage capacity currently available in Germany. The increased use of renewable energy makes this option more important and is being followed with interest by the mining authority.

=== Floating solar park ===
On 6 May 2020, Meyer Burger, a manufacturer of solar cell production machinery, presented its idea for a huge solar park in the Hambach open-cast mine. This would generate electricity with a capacity of around ten gigawatts, which would roughly correspond to the combined power generation capacity of the Weisweiler, Neurath, Niederaussem, and Frimmersdorf coal-fired power plants, which are currently dependent on the open-cast mines. Considerations for later use of the area of fifty square kilometres include flooding to form a lake landscape. According to Meyer Burger CEO, Gunter Erfurt, it would be conceivable to cover Lake Hambach with solar modules. Up to fifty million solar modules could be installed as a floating solar park, as has already been realised in other parts of the world.

According to Erfurt, the construction of a state-of-the-art plant for cell and module production is currently being evaluated. In an interview with Radio Rur, Uwe Rau replied that such an idea was feasible, as a major advantage of the Hambach open-cast mine was the power transmission lines already in place due to the coal-fired power plants in the area, which could thus continue to be used.

RWE Power AG announced in May 2020 that photovoltaic projects for the Sophienhöhe are conceivable.

Andreas Pinkwart, Minister for Economic Affairs, Innovation, Digitisation and Energy of North Rhine-Westphalia, also expressed his support for the project.

== Criticism and protests ==
Since around 2012, an area within the remaining part of the Hambach Forest has been occupied by environmentalists to prevent its planned destruction by RWE.

The occupation involves a settlement with around two dozen tree houses and numerous road barricades. The barricades were erected to prevent mining company and police vehicles from entering.

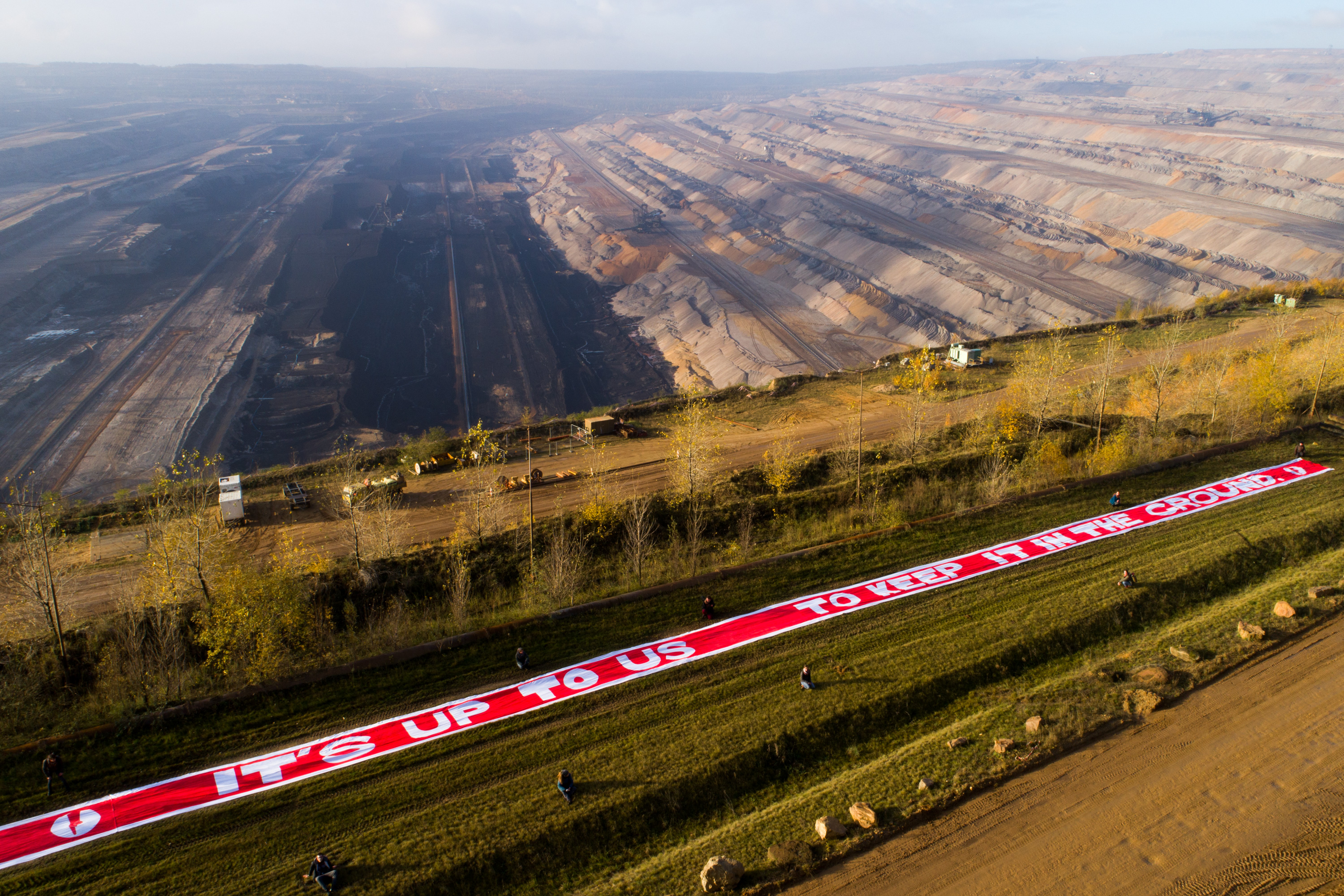
Banner project by JunepA in Tagebau Hambach, 2017

In November 2017, environmentalists entered the mine and temporarily halted operations. They were met with police using horses and pepper spray.

In 2004, Greenpeace activists demonstrated against climate damage in the Hambach mine due to power generation using lignite. They flew over the open pit with a hot air balloon, occupied an excavator for several days, and painted it partly pink. On 13 May 2009, the joint activity of the local action group of citizens' initiatives against the relocation of the A4 and Friends of the Earth Germany (BUND) failed before the Federal Administrative Court. The plaintiffs tried to stop the relocation of the A4, which was deemed necessary for the planned extension of the open-pit mine and justified this, inter alia, with feared noise pollution, as well as the possible threat to the protected Bechstein bat and other species. In 2009, construction of the new section of motorway began. In September 2014, it was opened to traffic.

Since 2008, there have been increasing complaints about possible damage to the hill in the Elsdorf-Heppendorf area. Since the burden of proof lies with the complainants, it is difficult to prove the mining operator guilty. The newly formed brown coal committee therefore decided on 16 April 2010 to set up the Bergschaden Braunkohle NRW reclamation service for damage victims in the Rhenish lignite mining area. The former chairman of the Higher Regional Court Hamm Gero Debusmann was appointed chairman of the recourse office.

In November 2012 and March 2013, the police cleared tent and hut camps of mining opponents in the remaining Hambach Forest. In 2012, a squatter had to be fetched from a six-metre deep tunnel and the following year, two activists were roped off a tree platform. Later, a new camp was built at another location in the Hambach Forest.

In September 2018, a journalist died after falling from the tree structures built by activists.

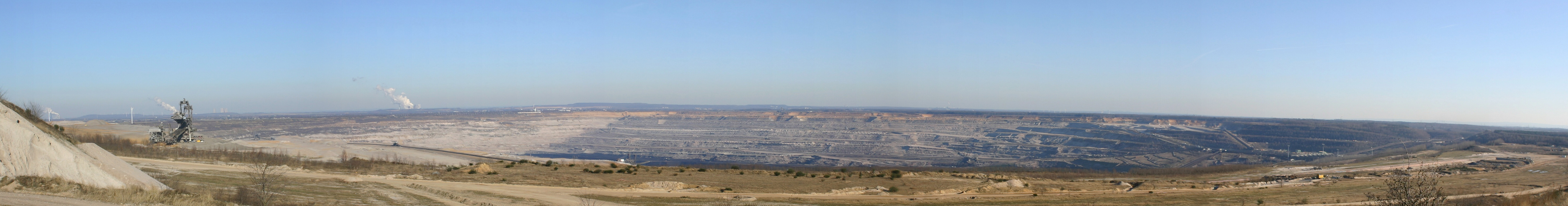
Panoramic view from Sophienhöhe
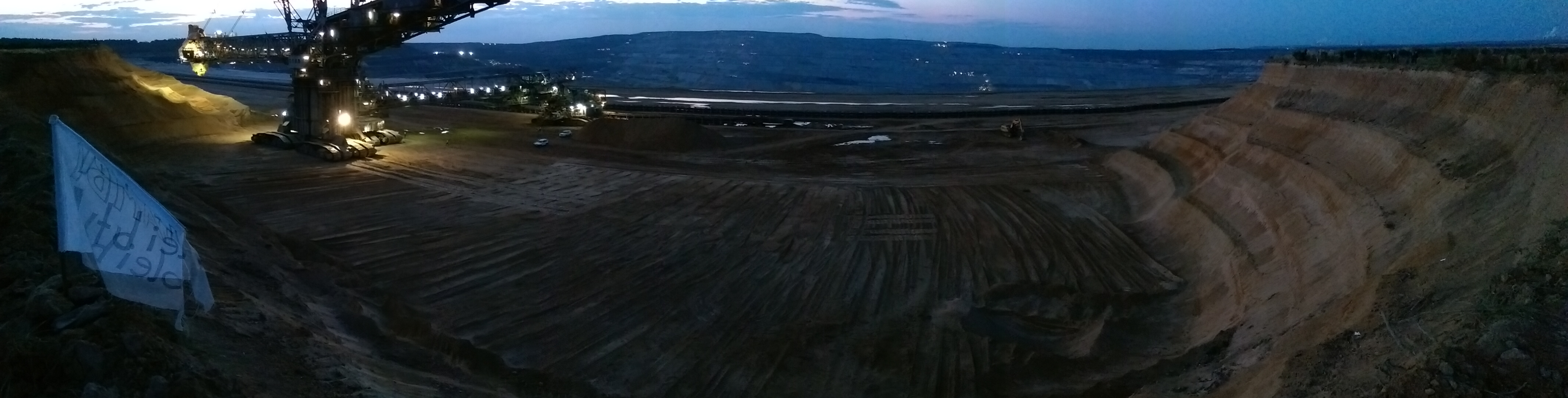
Hambach open-pit lignite mine in the neighbourhood of the Hambach Forest, showing a bucket-wheel excavator during the demonstrations on 6 October 2018

== See also ==
- Étang de Lavalduc – lowest naturally occurring point in the European Union
- Ende Gelände 2017
- Ende Gelände 2018
- Garzweiler open pit mine
- Commission on Growth, Structural Change and Employment
- Rheinisches Braunkohlerevier
