= Commission on Growth, Structural Change and Employment =

German Commission

Commission on Growth, Structural Change and Employment (German: Kommission für Wachstum, Strukturwandel und Beschäftigung (WSB), originally Kommission für Wachstum, Strukturwandel und Regionalentwicklung, commonly just called Kohlekommission, that is coal commission, in Germany) is a commission created by the German federal government on 6 June 2018, after the governing coalition of the Christian Democrats (CDU/CSU) with the Social Democrats (SPD) in February 2018.

The committee was supposed to submit its final report to the federal government on 1 February 2019. Submission of the recommended measures on social and structural development and financing of States, in which brown coal is extracted, was expected by the end of October 2018. These measures should include climate change mitigation policy measures, especially a fossil fuel phase-out plan with a target phase-out date and measures to achieve the greenhouse gas emission reduction goal by 2020 Germany has committed to.

The commission's report was published in January 2019 recommending Germany to entirely phase out and shut down the 84 remaining coal-fired plants on its territory by 2038. While this was applauded as a success by some, others, including scientists and climate experts, argued that this still would not be fast enough, and that to prevent the climate from reaching an irreversible tipping point, the phase out must have happened by 2030 already.

== See also ==
- Hambach Forest
- Ende Gelände 2018
- Ende Gelände 2019
- Rhenish lignite mining area
- Lusatian lignite mining area
- Middle German lignite mining area
- School strike for climate / Fridays for Future (FFF)
- September 2019 climate strikes
