= Klima Action Malaysia =

Climate activist group in Malaysia

Klima Action Malaysia (KAMY) is a Malaysian climate activist group that was started by a group of youths. They were founded in 2019 and are one of the only grassroots climate activist groups in Malaysia.

== Aims ==
The grassroots movement demands climate policies based on peace, equity and democracy urging politicians to take a stand on climate action. They have been actively involved in initiatives which includes multi-language advocacy, climate protests, capacity building workshops and community awareness since April 2019 in an effort to empower communities and reach a larger demographic.

== Activities ==
Klima Action Malaysia organised the MY Climate Strike on 21 September 2019 as part of the Global Climate Strike that was held worldwide in the same month for a week. KAMY had the support of Greenpeace Malaysia and Amnesty International Malaysia to organise this protest that was supported by almost 1000 Malaysians and 50 environmental activist and supporters that marched from Sogo to Dataran Merdeka. The strike began with speeches from notable activists. The protest ended with a die-in, a symbolic performance of climate activists dying for earth where everyone dropped to the ground.

As part of the project #MISIBANTUA, Klima Action Malaysia has taken the initiative to send aid and immediate relief to indigenous communities in Malaysia during the movement control order through collaboration with several NGOs such as Shaq Koyok, Gerimis Project, KUASA and Diri Bumi Ecological. They have sent aid to a total of 1548 families, amounting to 6192 individuals.

KAMY has partnered with Diribumi Ecological Practice and Global Youth Biodiversity Network (GYBN) in conjunction with International Day for Biological Diversity on the 22 May 2020. This project documents and showcases a video series of permaculture activities conducted by youths during the 2020 pandemic. It was also released in the United Nations Decade on Biodiversity IG.
