= September 2019 climate strikes =

Fridays for Future global school climate strikes

- Part of the school climate strikes
- Date: 20–27 September 2019
- Location: Global
- Caused by: Climate change concerns
- Methods: Protest

Lead figures
| Future Coalition; Greta Thunberg; UK Student Climate Network | |

Number
- 6–7.6 million, globally

Protest attendee numbers from 20 to 27 September 2019, by country: 1,000,000+ 100,000+ 10,000+ 1,000+ 100+ Small protests, unclear numbers

The September 2019 climate strikes, also known as the Global Week for Future, were a series of international strikes and protests to demand action be taken to address climate change, which took place from 20 to 27 September 2019. The strikes' key dates were 20 September, which was three days before the United Nations Climate Summit, and 27 September. The protests took place across 4,500 locations in 150 countries. The event stemmed from the Fridays for Future school strike for climate movement, inspired by Swedish climate activist Greta Thunberg. The Guardian reported that roughly 6 million people participated in the events, whilst 350.org – a group that organised many of the protests – claim that 7.6 million people participated.

The 20 September protests were likely the largest climate strikes in world history. Organisers reported that over 4 million people participated in strikes worldwide, including 1.4 million participants in Germany. An estimated 300,000 protesters took part in Australian strikes, a further 300,000 people joined UK protests and protesters in New York – where Greta Thunberg delivered a speech – numbered roughly 250,000. More than 2,000 scientists in 40 countries pledged to support the strikes.

A second wave of protests took place on 27 September, in which an estimated 2 million people took part in over 2,400 protests. There were reported figures of one million protesters in Italy, and 170,000 people in New Zealand. In Montreal, where Greta Thunberg spoke, the Montreal school board cancelled classes for 114,000 of its students. An estimated 500,000 protesters, including several federal party leaders, joined the march in Montreal.

== Background ==
A call to join the global climate strike on 20 September 2019

The strike is the third global strike of the school strike for climate movement. The first strike in March 2019 had 1.6 million participants from over 125 countries. The second in May 2019 was timed to coincide with the 2019 European Parliament election, consisting of over 1,600 events in 125 countries. The third set of global strikes were scheduled primarily for 20 and 27 September. They were timed to occur around the UN Youth Climate Summit (21 September) and the UN Climate Action Summit (23 September). 27 September is also the anniversary of the publishing of Silent Spring, a 1962 book which was key to starting the environmentalist movement.

== Actions by country ==
=== Afghanistan ===
In Kabul, youth marched against climate change under the protection of army troops. The public health ministry of Afghanistan reported that thousands of Afghan people die annually from air pollution.

=== Angola ===
Over 50,000 children and youth gathered for the first time in the capital city of Luanda in solidarity on the climate change movement.

=== Antarctica ===
A small group of researchers stationed at Antarctica joined the strike.

=== Antigua and Barbuda ===
Students from various schools in the islands country lined the streets near the Botanical Gardens in the capital city of St. John's and chanting "we want climate justice now", "sea levels are rising and so are we" and "keep our carbon in the soil no more oil".

=== Argentina ===
Argentina scheduled 18 marches for 20 September as part of the global climate strike. Young Argentinians who demanded urgent measures were concentrated in the central Plaza de Mayo in the capital city of Buenos Aires. In addition to the international slogans, Argentina had the motto "We do not want to be the garbage dump of the world", in reference to the controversial decree president made by president Mauricio Macri that made the criteria for importing waste from other countries more flexible.

On 27 September, a further 30 strikes took place.

=== Australia ===
The Global Climate Strike started in Australia. On 20 September, organisers estimated that over 300,000 people attended 100 rallies across the country. Over 2,500 businesses allowed employees to take part in the strikes, or closed entirely for the day. In Melbourne, the protest gathered an estimated 100,000 participants. Organisers claim that 80,000 people took part in a protest at The Domain in Sydney. A strike in Brisbane gathered a reported 30,000 protesters, whilst organisers reported figures of 22,000 in Hobart, 15,000 in Canberra, 10,000 in Perth, 10,000 in Newcastle and 8,000 in Adelaide.

Australian protests called for the government to reach "100 percent renewable energy generation and exports" by 2030, to refrain from starting new fossil fuel projects and to fund "a just transition and job creation for all fossil fuel industry workers and communities". As of 2019, Australia is a leading exporter of coal and liquefied natural gas. Protesters also demanded the halt of all construction of the Adani-Carmichael coal mine in central Queensland. The Adani mine has been a major source of contention in Australian politics since its initial approval in 2014.

At Bondi Beach, activists removed cigarette butts and bits of plastics from the sand.

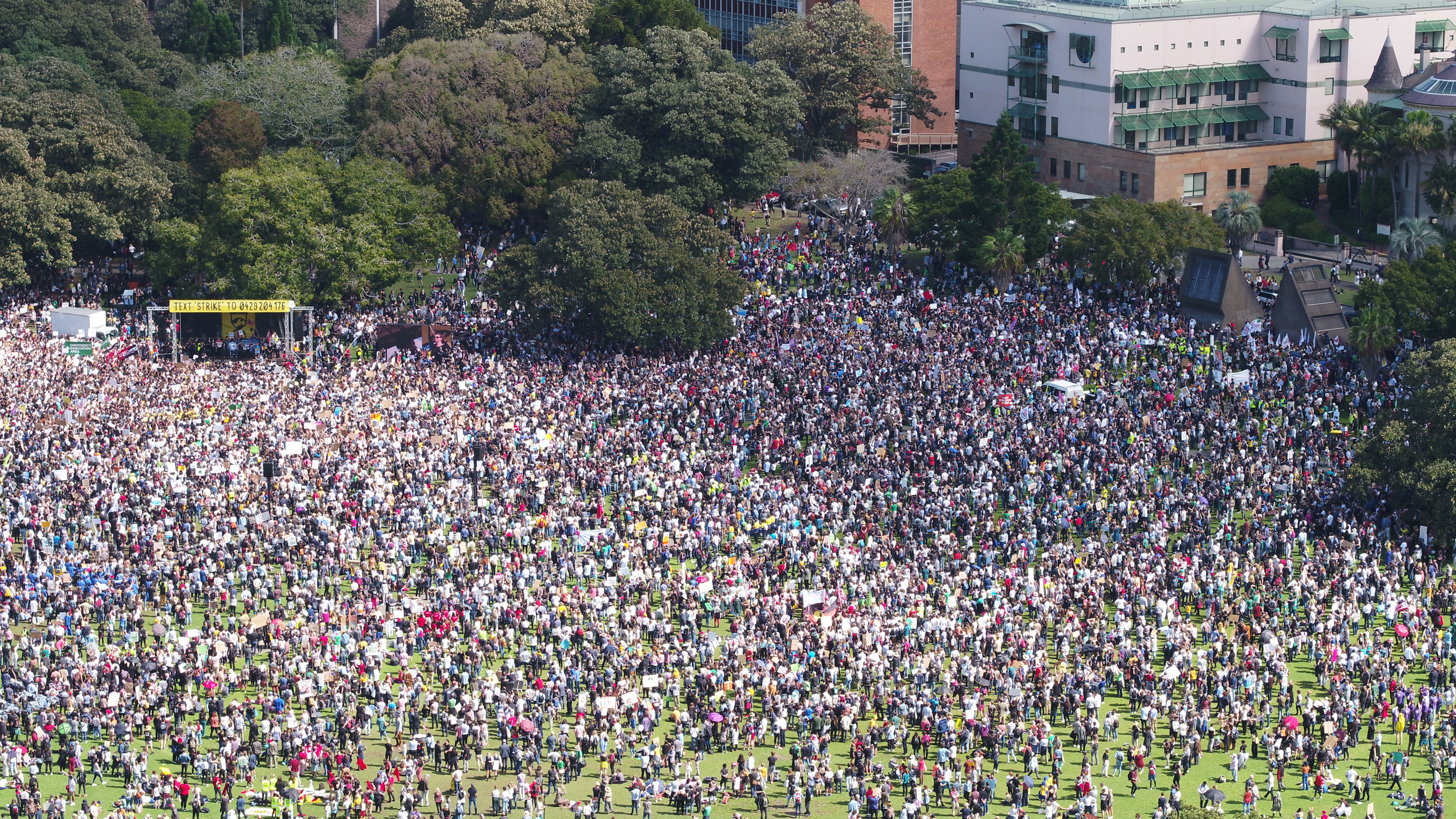
Protesters in Sydney on 20 September 2019

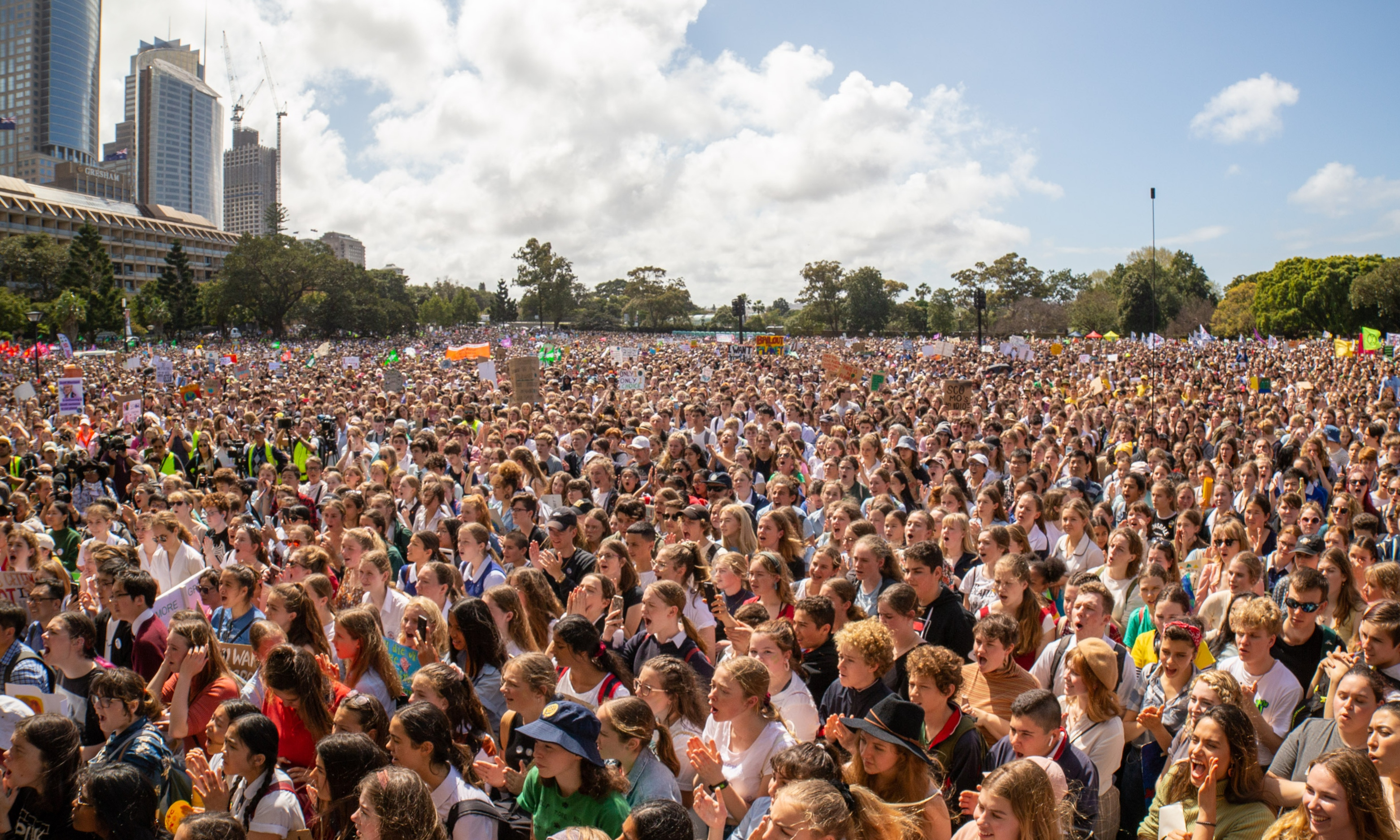
Protesters in Sydney on 20 September 2019

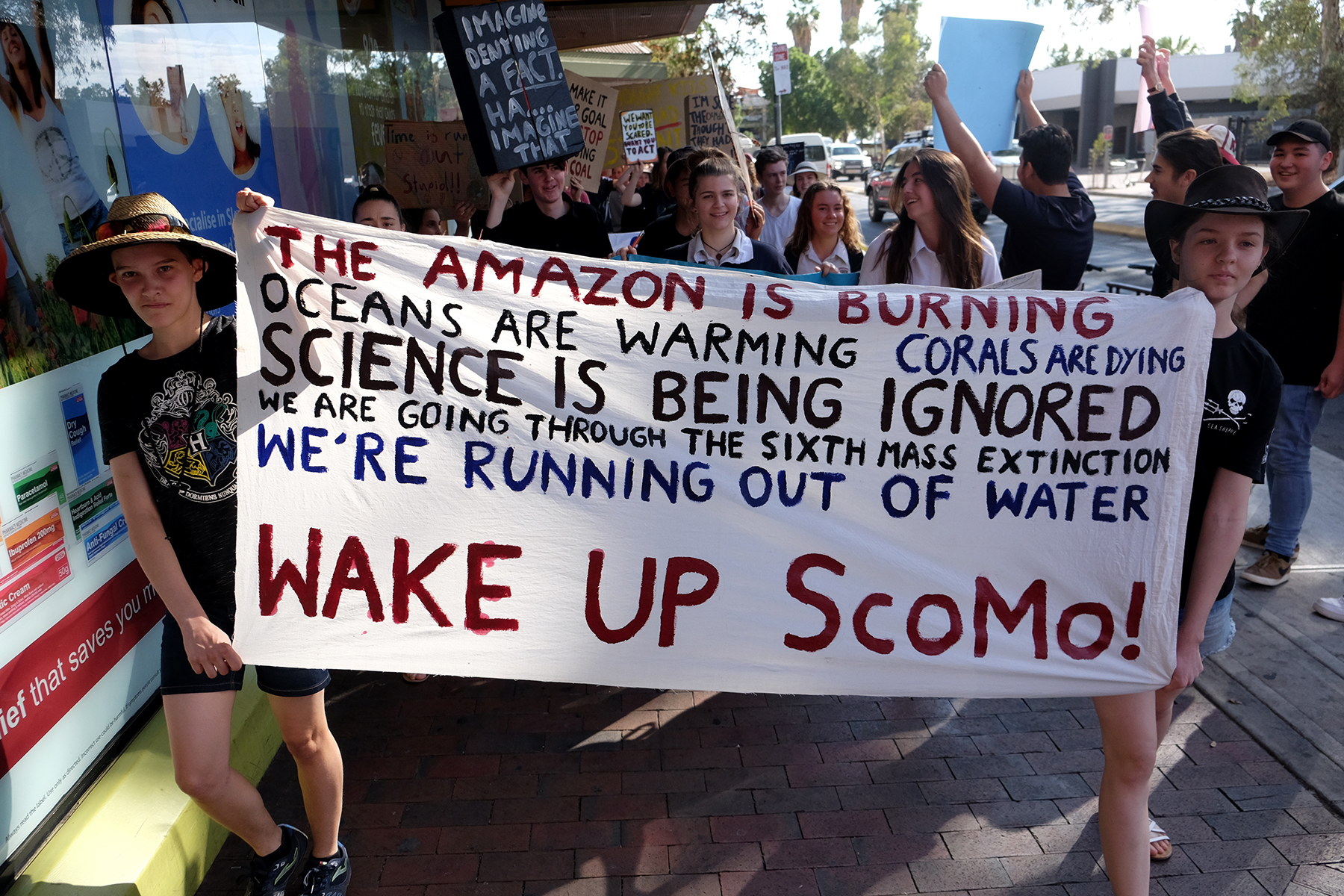
Protesters in Alice Springs

=== Austria ===
Around 150,000 students marched in the streets of Austria on 27 September, as part of the climate strike with the demonstrations have been declared as school events in the capital city of Vienna as well in states of Burgenland and Vorarlberg.

=== Bangladesh ===
Protests in Dhaka were joined by thousands of school children from different schools, urging world leaders to take action and forming a human chain.

=== Belarus ===
A single-person strike took place in Minsk. One member of Belarus Young Greens, Veronica Yanovich went on a strike on her own, holding a banner. This strike drew media attention in Belarus.

=== Belgium ===
According to the police, 15,000 people were on the streets in Brussels participating in the global protest. Some media outlets reported that some schools made the protest into an extracurricular activity to help motivate students and not punish them for attending.

=== Bolivia ===
Students from La Paz and Cochabamba jointly took part in the climate strike that aimed to demand urgent action from leaders to stop the negative impacts on the environment, with the youth marching through the Paseo del Prado of La Paz and forming a human carpet. The protest included speeches about the fire in Chiquitania where the youth demanded the repeal of the law authorizing deforestation in the country's east, and requested the declaration of a national climate emergency. Students and teachers from the University of San Simón in Cochabamba marched to demand an indefinite stop on environmental destruction in the Chiquitania area.

=== Bosnia and Herzegovina ===
A protest was held in Bosnia's capital of Sarajevo in front of the Eternal Fire memorial with other protests also held in other Bosnian cities.

=== Brazil ===
In Brazil, 48 protests were planned. Thousands protested in cities such as Rio de Janeiro, São Paulo and Brasília. Protestors rallied urging the Brazilian government to take a stance in combat the increase in Amazon rainforest deforestation and wildfires.

=== Bulgaria ===
Three events on the climate strikes were organised by Fridays for Future with a procession held in Bulgaria's capital of Sofia from the National Palace of Culture. A second procession was held in Varna at the entrance of the Sea Garden while in Samokov, the public gathered at Zahari Zograf Square.

=== Burundi ===
In Bujumbura, 35 activists cleared rubbish on the shores of Lake Tanganyika.

=== Canada ===
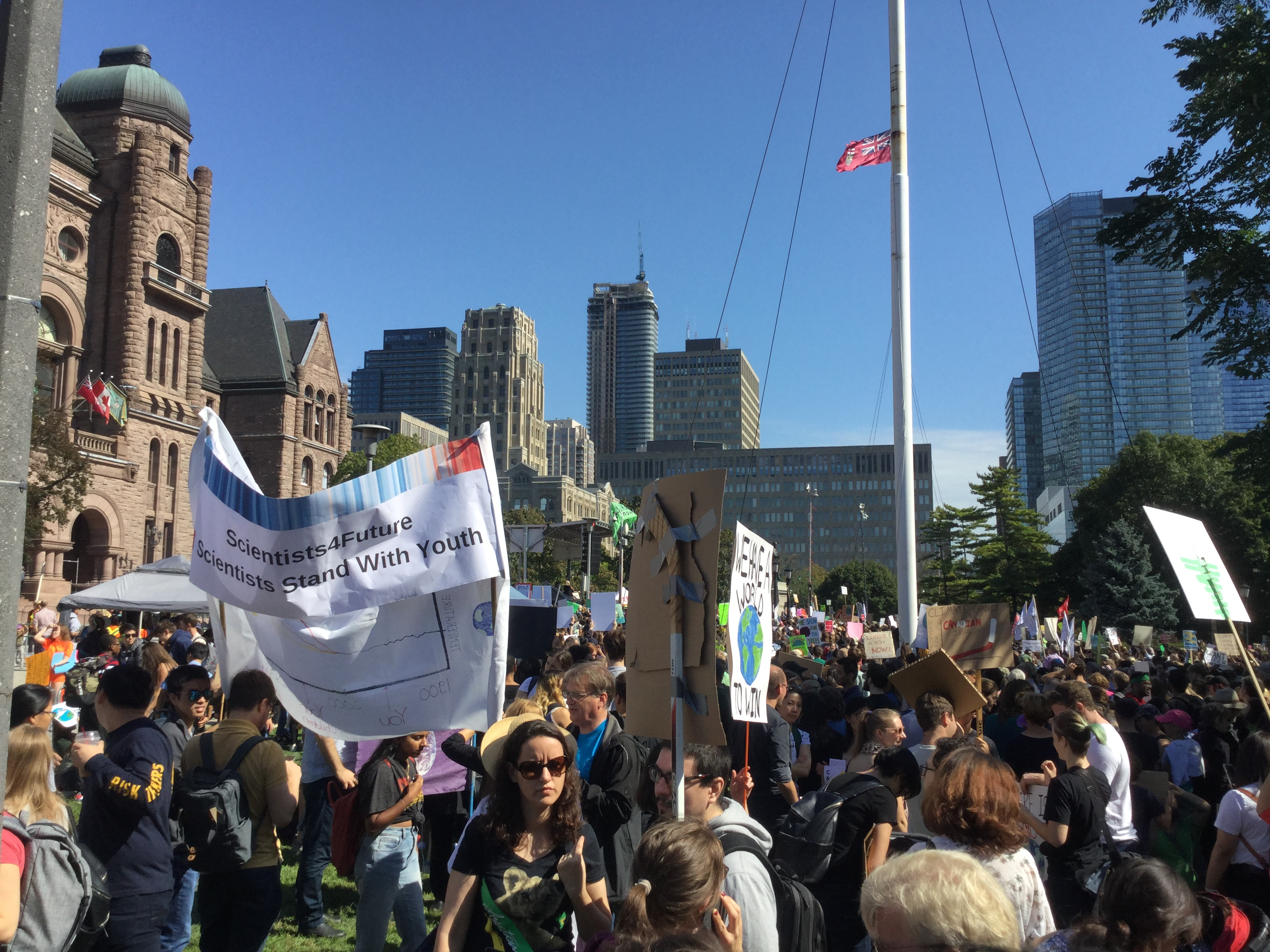
Protesters at Queen's Park in Toronto on 27 September 2019

Strikes began on 20 September, with "die-in" demonstrations staged in Vancouver and many other cities across the country. A "die-in" is a protest in which people lie on the floor, closing their eyes or staring blankly above them, as if they were dead. Further climate action demonstrations were scheduled across 80 locations on 27 September, when Greta Thunberg arrived in Montreal, Quebec. The city's largest school board, Commission scolaire de Montréal, cancelled classes for their 114,000 pupils to allow them to attend. The Toronto District School Board advised teachers to avoid scheduling tests or assignments on that day. However, students under 18 years of age were required to obtain parental permission. Further strikes were planned at Dawson College in Montreal, and at the University of British Columbia.

On 27 September, at least 85 Canadian cities and towns participated in climate strike actions. Over 100,000 people turned up to a demonstration in Vancouver and another 20,000 in Victoria. The school districts of Vancouver and Surrey permitted students to join the march, provided they had parental approval. 600 students from the University of Calgary skipped morning classes in order to join a rally near city hall. Crowd sizes in Ottawa exceeded those on Canada Day celebrations. Some people chanted their slogans in both official languages of English and French. In Halifax, Nova Scotia, more than 10,000 protesters marched through the downtown area. In Edmonton, Alberta, thousands protested near the provincial legislature, but stopped short of criticizing the fossil fuel industry. Some even expressed their love for it. Montreal Mayor Valérie Plante declared public transit in her city was free on the date of the protest and awarded Greta Thunberg the keys to the city. In a remark made while welcoming Thunberg to city hall, she repeated her plan to reduce carbon emissions by 55% by 2030 and finally carbon neutral by 2050. Montreal's transit authority (STM) shared a map on social media showing which areas to avoid due to construction work, which Metro stations to get on and off, and where bus services were disrupted by the climate march. Organisers claimed that half a million people joined the march in Montreal. While city officials initially estimated that number to be around 315,000, Mayor Plante later stated that 500,000 people indeed took part in the march. The turnout in Canada altogether may have been one million or more.

==== Political response ====
National political party leaders Yves-François Blanchet of Bloc Québécois, Elizabeth May of the Green Party, and Prime Minister Justin Trudeau of the Liberal Party marched in Montreal while Jagmeet Singh of the New Democratic Party joined a protest in Victoria, British Columbia. The marches helped to spark discussion on climate policy in the 2019 federal election. Prime Minister Trudeau promised that if re-elected, his government would plant two billion trees in ten years. This would cost CAN$200 million per year but will be paid for by revenue from the Trans Mountain Pipeline, he claimed. He also met Thunberg, who said he was "obviously not doing enough". In June 2019, Trudeau's Liberal government declared a national climate emergency before approving the Trans Mountain pipeline extension project. Leaders Andrew Scheer of the Conservative Party and Maxime Bernier of the People's Party did not attend any events. Climate change was a major political issue for the 2019 election, alongside healthcare, the economy, and taxes. Canada's aim was to reduce carbon emissions by 30% compared to 2005 levels by 2030. Details were, however, lacking. Canada was a top oil producer and had one of the highest emissions per capita in the world. It was not on track to meet its environmental goals. Moreover, environmental protection and energy were politically divisive issues in Canada. People from British Columbia, especially the coastal region, and Quebec, a province with low rates of carbon emissions due to its hydroelectric resources, are particularly green-minded whereas Alberta is home to most of Canada's oil reserves, from which derive hundreds of thousands of jobs and billions of dollars in tax revenue.

=== Chile ===
Protest were mainly held in Chile's capital city of Santiago, with 30,000 people attending. In total, 19 protests were held across the country. Protesters involved with the Future Santiago group said, "Our main demand is to declare the climatic and ecological emergency, and that this means the closure of coal thermoelectric plants by 2030 and those that are obsolete from here at the end of the year".

=== China ===
No officially sanctioned protests were held in China. A spokesperson for the China Youth Climate Action Network, Zheng Xiaowen, said that "Chinese youth have their own methods" and that action would take place. Some Chinese youths picked up trash in Beijing on 21 September.

=== Colombia ===
In Colombia, 43 events were planned. As one of the most biodiverse countries in the world, the main concerns on climate change is deforestation. Local activists convened a sit-in through a cold and rainy day in the Plaza de Bolívar, the heart of the Colombian capital of Bogotá. Further meetings were held in the department of Caquetá, in the south of the country where under the auspices of the DeJusticia study centre, 40 young environmentalists from the Colombian Amazon met to participate in a day of creative activism.

=== Croatia ===
A climate protest attended by thousands of youth held at the European Square in Croatia's capital city of Zagreb, where protesters shouted "Time is now" and "Eco, not ego," while heading towards the city St. Mark's Square (Markov Square).

=== Cuba ===
Even though there were plans for a strike in Cuba, the strike was not officially authorised by the government and didn't take place. Instead, many individual protests were reported all over Cuba. A bike ride was organised, starting in Parque de los Mártires, to promote bicycling as an eco-friendly way of transport.

=== Cyprus ===
Youth for Climate organised a march from the House of Representatives to the Ministry of Energy in Nicosia, with protesters criticising the country's extraction of natural gas.

=== Czech Republic ===
Thousands of youths reportedly gathered in Prague. About 2,000 secondary and university students along with adults with children met on the Old Town Square in Prague centre, and initiated by students from the Czech branch of the Fridays for Future environmental movement, inspired by Greta Thunberg. Prior to the march going forward, many students and others gave speeches in the town square.

Students launched the Week for Climate protest event that is prepared to offer a series of educational and cultural programs and lectures that is planned to run through 27 September. There was a calm and peaceful counter-protest by a dozen members and followers of the Free Citizens Party.

=== Democratic Republic of the Congo ===
An event for two consecutive days was held in the city of Goma, the capital of the country's North Kivu province, as a response to the exploration for fossil fuels in the Virunga National Park. Thousand of school children from the city walked to commit themselves resolutely in the fight against global warming. In line with the climate action, the United Nations Organisation Stabilisation Mission in the Democratic Republic of the Congo (MONUSCO) together with the Association of Journalists for Peace of Congo (AJCP), as well as some civil society organisations including the international cultural platform Ciel-Bleu, organised a walk in the street of Kinshasa known as a march for peace. The Deputy Special Representative of the UN Secretary-General in the DRC François Grignon further explained that "There is no peace without development and there is no sustainable development without environmental protection and no protection of the environment without stability", adding that it is because of this that the international day of peace is placed jointly with the climate action rally.

=== Denmark ===
The City Hall Square of Copenhagen was jointly filled by young and old people as part of the global strike. Speeches, music, and dances on the topic of the climate were performed.

=== Ecuador ===
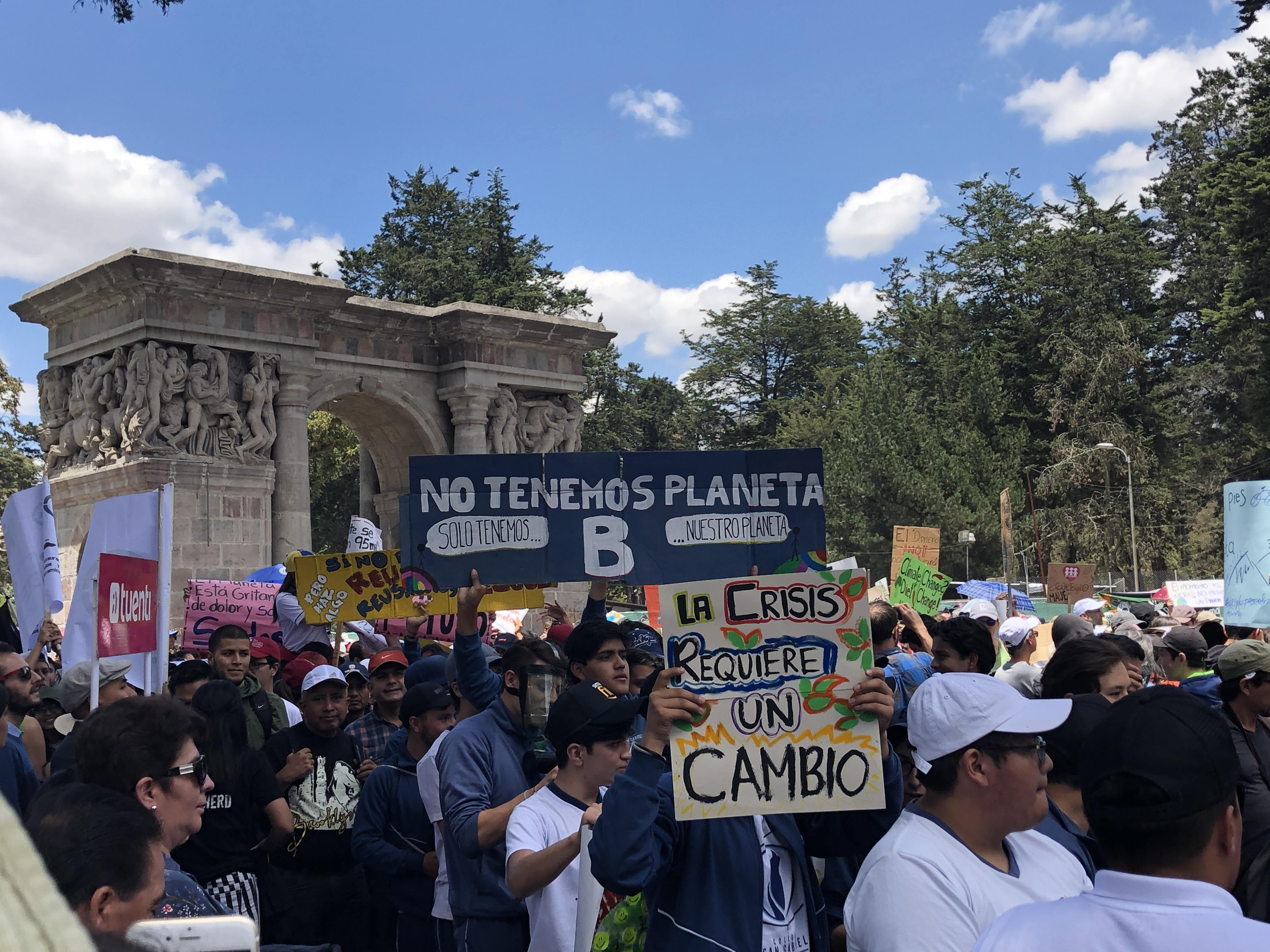
Protest in Quito

The Plaza de la Independencia in Ecuador's capital city of Quito was filled with hundreds of environmental activists as part of the strike.

=== El Salvador ===
Dozens of students, activists and authorities of the state University of El Salvador (UES) held a rally in the capital city of San Salvador to declare a "climate emergency" due to the effects of global warming. The students, who toured several of the main streets of the Salvadoran capital with banners and dressed in shirts with environmental messages also asked for "climate justice".

=== Estonia ===
A youth march was held in Tallinn the capital city where the participants carried plastics as a sign of protest against plastic trash.

=== Fiji ===
People searched palm-fringed beaches for rubbish, heaved discarded car components from near the capital, Suva.

=== Finland ===
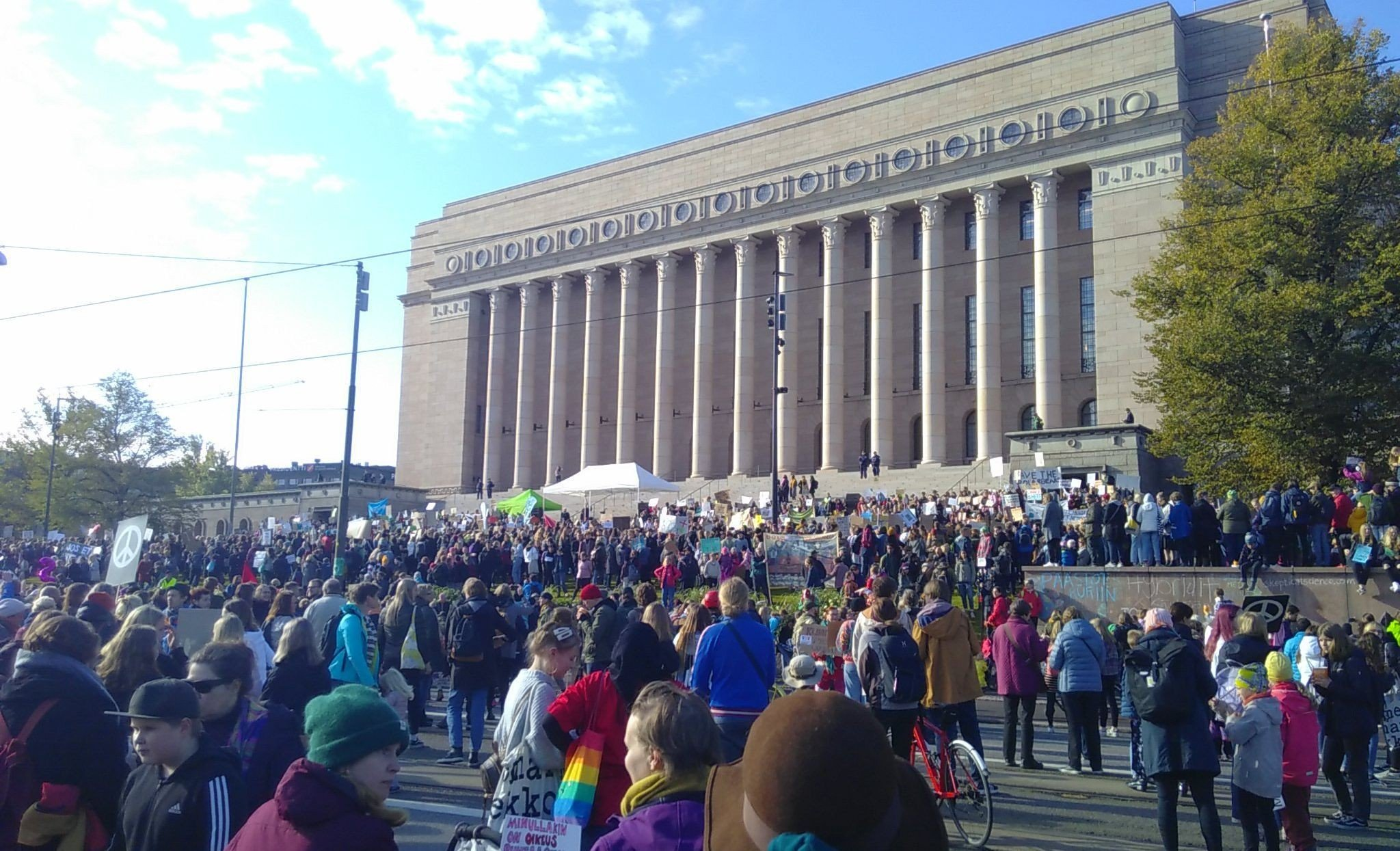
School strike for climate in front of the Parliament House, Helsinki, 27 September 2019.

The main protest took place in Finland's capital city of Helsinki with the city council giving permission for students to participate in the demonstration. Other strikes are also being organised in several other cities across the country including Espoo, Turku, Tampere, Oulu and Rovaniemi.

=== France ===
Climate demonstrators demand that their government and businesses reduce their environmental footprint and save the Amazon rain forest. These protests occurred during the annual French heritage weekend and at the same time as some other protests. Authorities in Paris deployed thousands of police officers to protect public properties and landmarks. A group of 9,400 demonstrators joined a rally in Paris, however, members of the Black Bloc anarchists infiltrated the protestors from a separate gilets jaunes (or yellow vests) demonstration. These individuals began to destroy shops and business windows, while torching mopeds and trash cans. Of the supposedly 1,000 anarchists, that joined the march, some 120 were arrested. 300 to 400 high school students demonstrated Friday morning in the streets of Clermont-Ferrand, according to the regional services broadcasting France 3 Auvergne-Rhône-Alpes and nearly a thousand according to the daily newspaper La Montagne.

Ahead of the U.N. climate conference, French construction materials company Saint-Gobain and cosmetics producer L'Oreal said they were committed to becoming carbon neutral by 2050.

=== Georgia ===
More than 100 people, including minors, gathered in front of the Tbilisi City Hall as part of the strikes. They also called for the protection of the city's wood and parklands.

=== Germany ===
575 demonstrations took place in hundreds of cities across Germany. Long-distance bus operator Flixbus offered to refund protesters who sent a selfie and a PDF of their ticket as evidence. Normally, the company gives people the option to pay extra to offset their carbon footprint. This company plans to phase in electric bus and to become carbon-neutral by 2030. Some German companies encouraged their employees to strike, including Flixbus itself, the GLS Bank, pension provider Hannoversche Kassen, price comparison website Idealo and energy company Naturstrom AG; Düsseldorf municipal employees were also permitted to strike. Organisers estimate that 1.4 million people in total joined strikes in Germany, including 270,000 protesters in Berlin, with independent figures reported of 100,000 in Hamburg, 70,000 in Cologne, 40,000 in Munich, Bremen and Hannover, 20,000 in Düsseldorf, Freiburg and Münster, 15,000 in Bonn and Dresden, and 8,000 in Aachen.

Protesters believed that the German government's plan to phase out coal power plants by 2038 is too late and demanded an earlier exit. Chancellor Angela Merkel stated tackling climate change is a top priority for her government. Due to pressure from environmental activists and the growing Green Party, after overnight talks, her government managed to work out a plan to cut carbon emissions by 55% compared to 1990s levels by 2030, to achieve carbon neutrality by 2050, and to spend €54 billion to tackle climate change. This package includes incentives for electric cars, taxes on domestic flights, and more funding for the national railway. Merkel later admitted that her country could have problems making this ambitious plan a reality. Germany presently has one of the highest electricity prices in Europe. Moreover, her government needs to meet U.N. climate goals on one hand and not alienate voters in the manufacturing industry on the other.

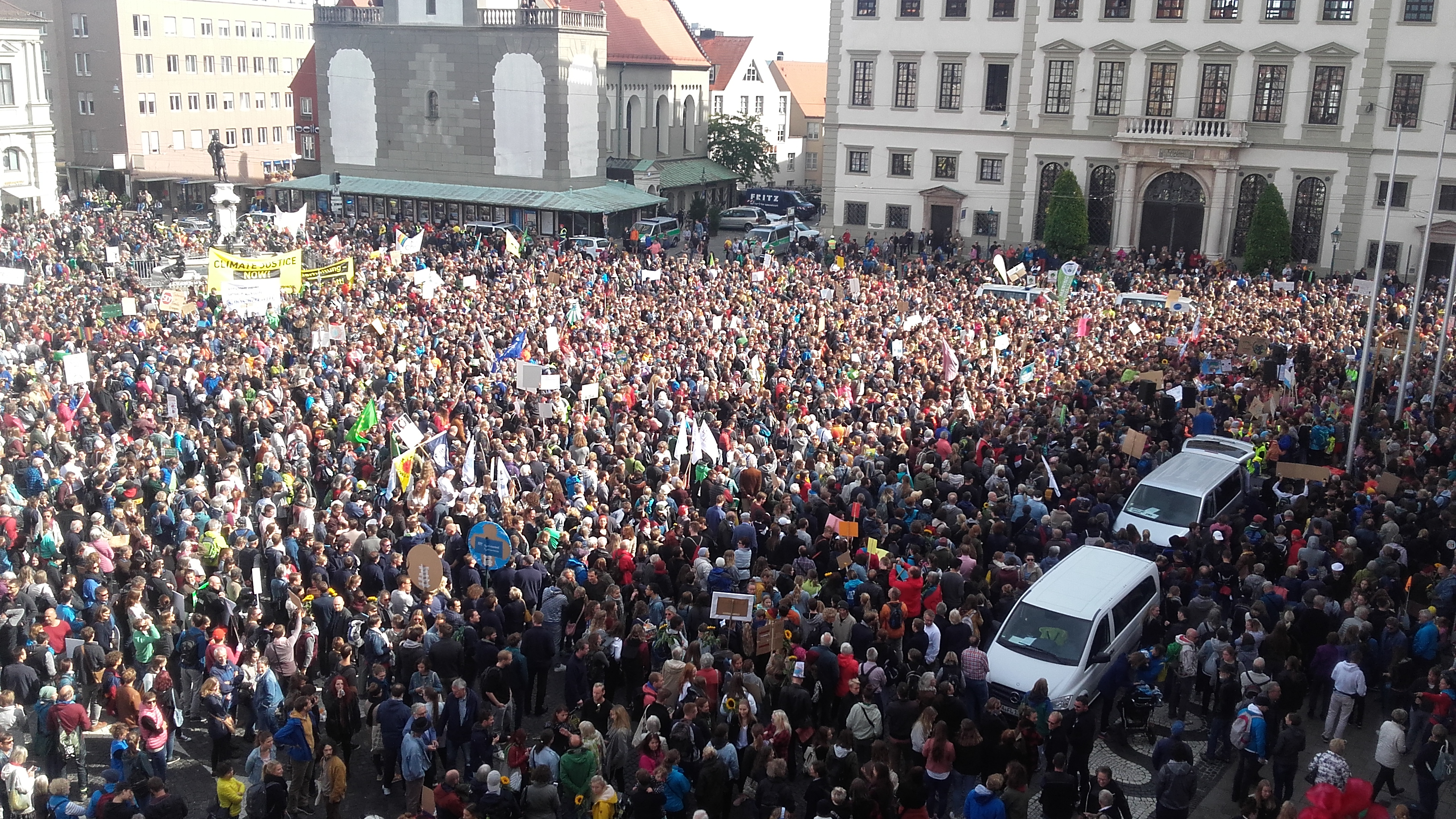
Protesters in Augsburg

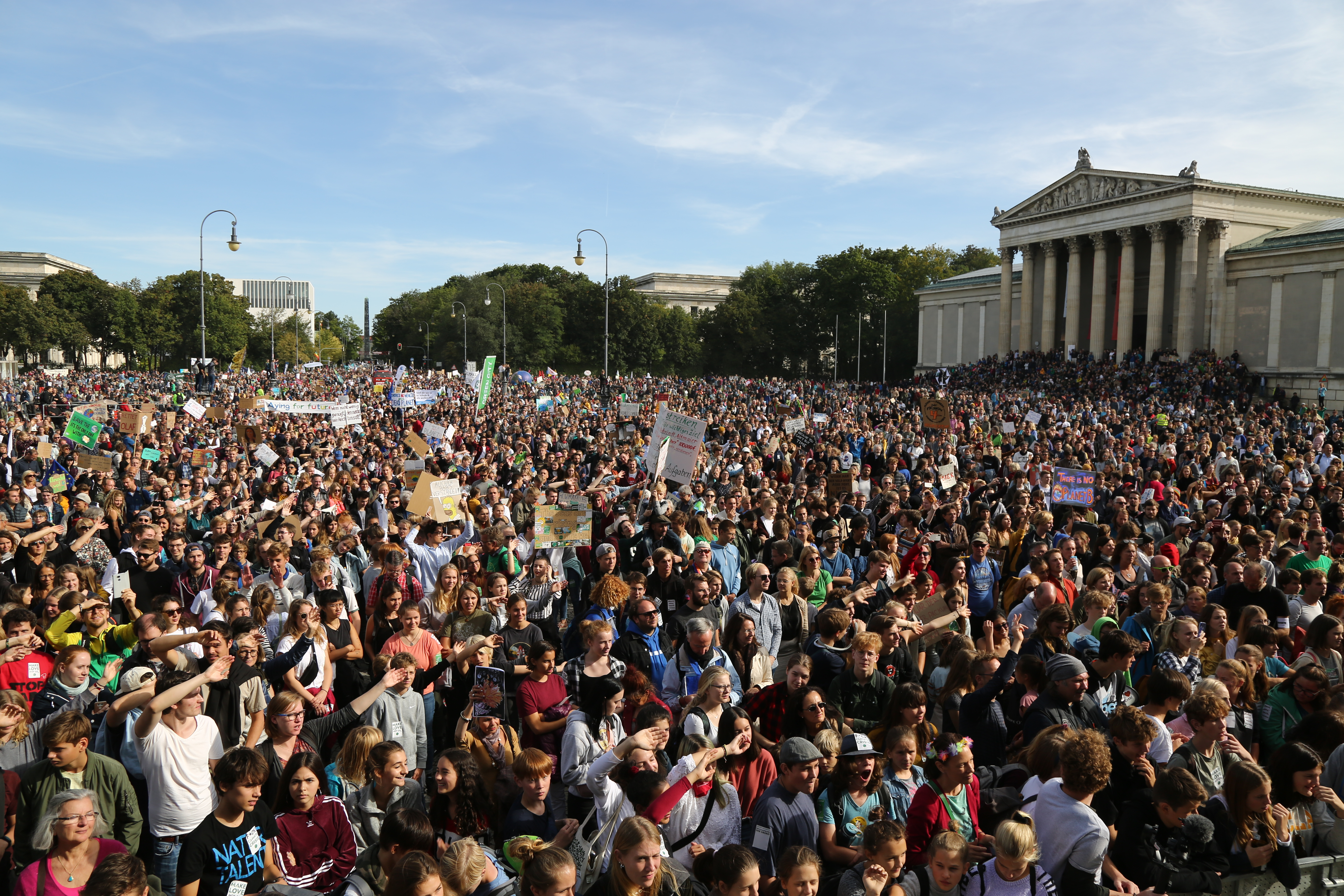
Protesters in Munich

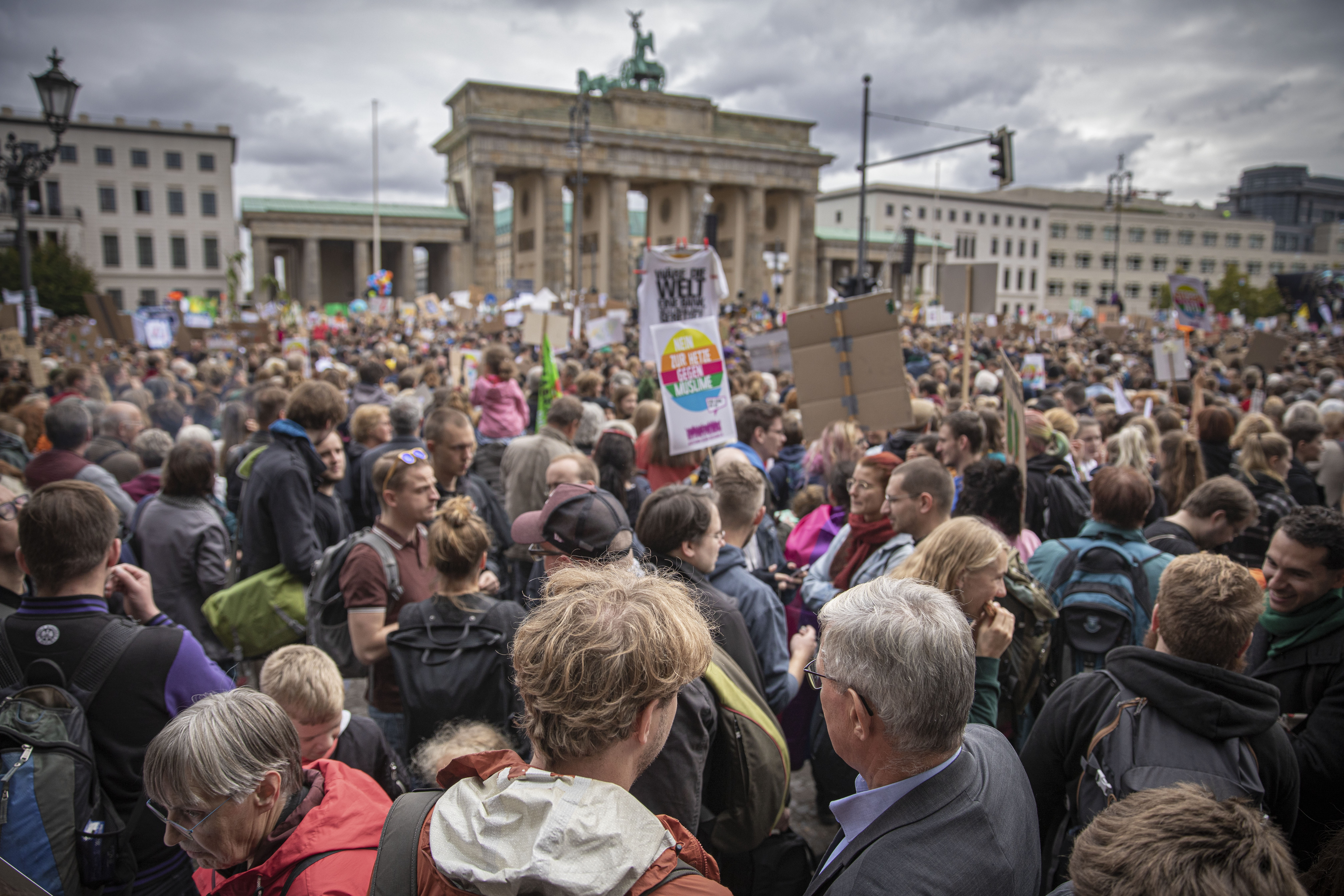
Protesters in Berlin

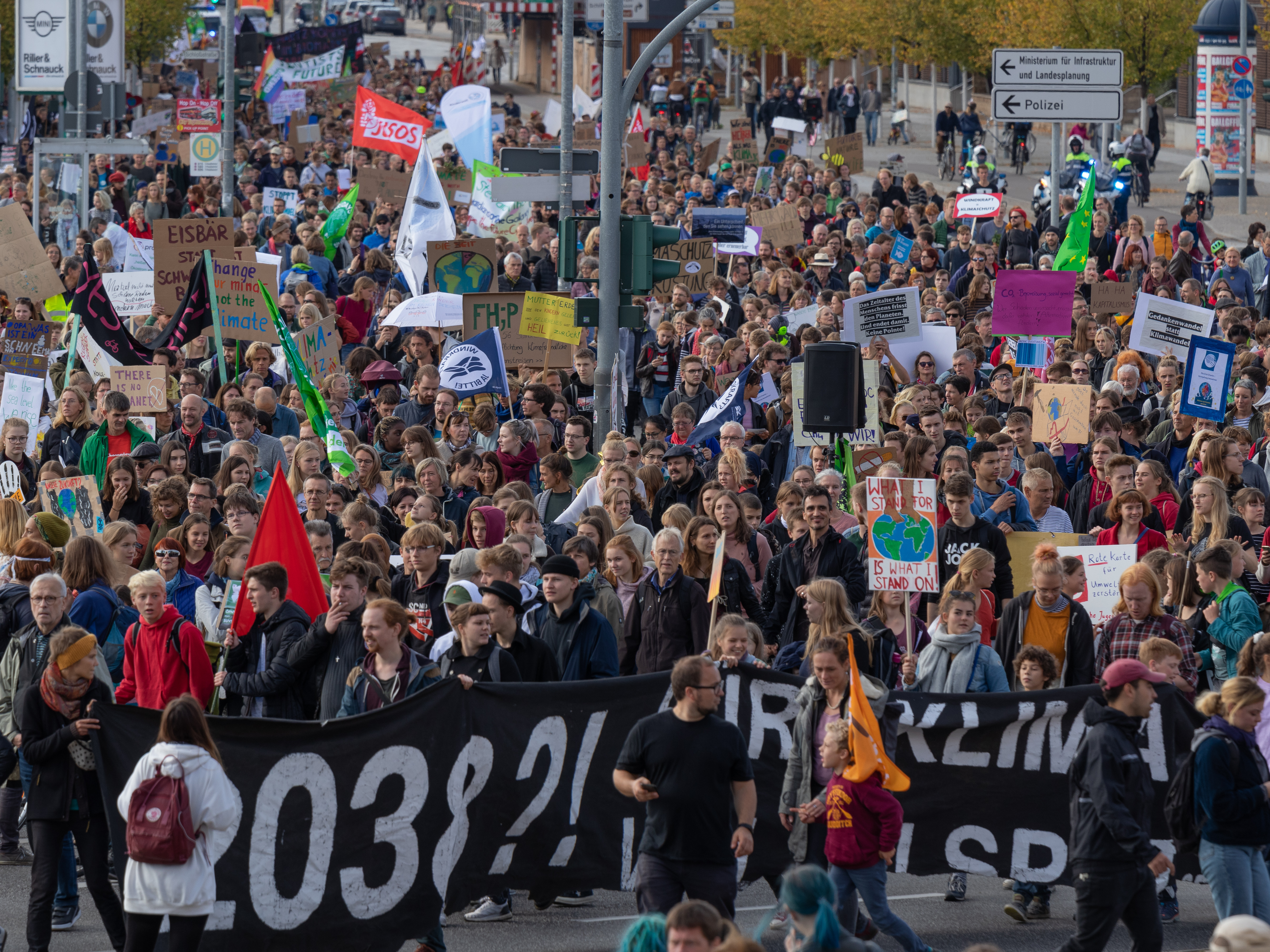
Protesters in Potsdam

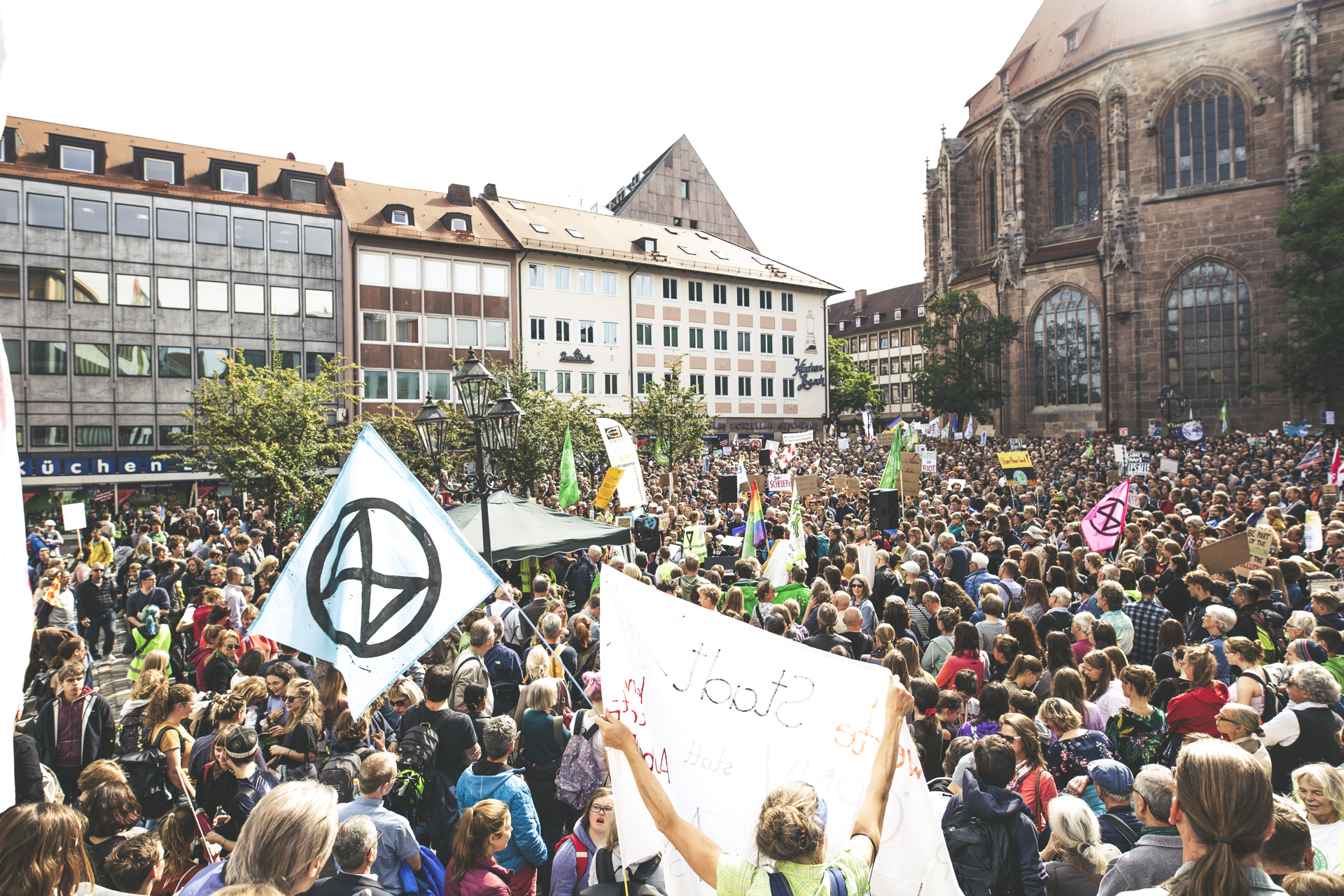
Protesters in Forchheim

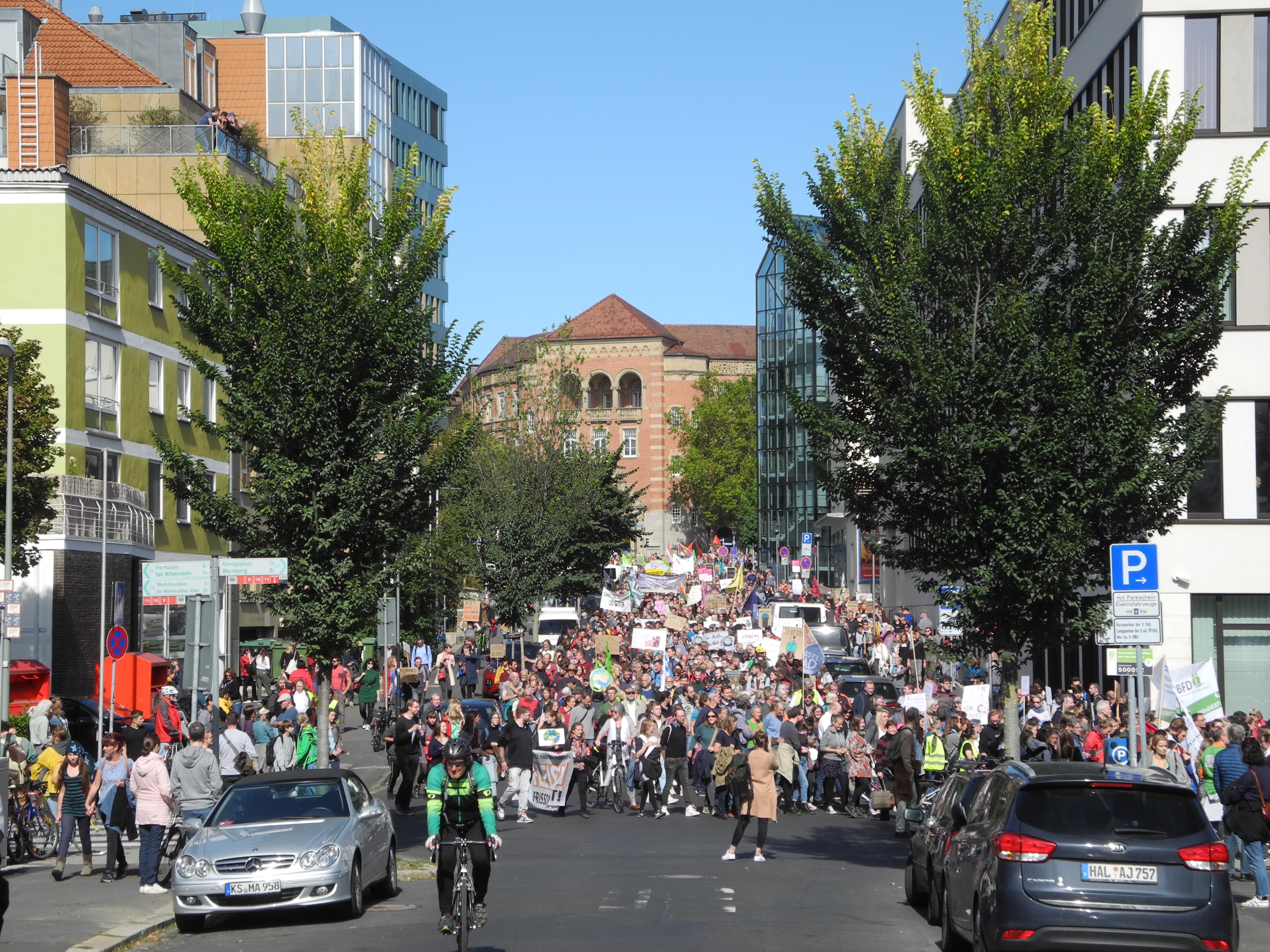
Protesters in Kassel

=== Greece ===
In Greece, protests took place in numerous places around the country, most notably in Athens and Thessaloniki. The attendance in Athens was approximately 3,000 protesters. The protests have been supported by the municipal authority of Athens and other organisations, as well as the government of Greece. Protests are organised from both local Fridays for Future groups, a national high school student organization called Κίνημα Μαθητών (Movement of students) and citizen's initiatives.

=== Guatemala ===
Hundreds of students and activists marched through the capital of Guatemala City, one of the deadliest countries for environmental activists. As students marched through the city, the Guatemalan government also announced a national ban and regulation of single-use plastic products, including straws and utensils, and styrofoam products for two years.

=== Hong Kong ===
A planned student march was abandoned due to safety concerns amidst the 2019–20 Hong Kong protests, although a small rally was held separately in the city's central business district. The rally was organised by Waste Free Hong Kong, 350HK and Extinction Rebellion HK, the groups also wrote the hashtag #morethan1% on their arm and posted it on their social media channels. The hashtag is in relation to a report that less than 1% of Hong Kong's energy is produced by renewable sources.

=== Hungary ===
The Fridays For Future Hungary and Extinction Rebellion Hungary organised a joint demonstration on Széll Kálmán Square in the Hungary's capital city of Budapest as part of the opening of Climate Week. Dozens of protesters have pretended to be dead to draw the attention of political leaders and decision-makers to the consequences of climate change and the need for substantive action.

=== Iceland ===
A protest was held in Iceland's capital city of Reykjavík, featuring a musical event on climate awareness. Participants first gathered at Hallgrímskirkja before walking towards the city public square of Austurvöllur.

=== India ===
In India, more than 14,000 people signed up for 26 events across the country as part of the global strikes. In Delhi, more than 2,000 students and school children demanded the Prime Minister to declare an immediate climate emergency in India.

While the Indian economy grew enormously in recent years, now the fifth largest in the world, nine of the ten most polluted cities on Earth are from India. In addition, an Indian government think tank suggested that many Indian cities could soon run out of drinking water.

=== Indonesia ===
A protest was held in Indonesia's capital city of Jakarta with participants from university and school students, members of about 50 civil groups together with children from different communities in Jakarta's suburban areas to voice their increasing concerns on the alarming changes happening to the global climate, demanding the government to take clear measures to mitigate environmental impacts. The protestors criticised the failure of the government to stop the rampant forest fires in Sumatra and Kalimantan which caused massive haze pollution not just in Indonesia but also to their neighbour of Malaysia and Singapore which exaggerated by the expansion of plantations and illegal land conversions in the country. In the Central Kalimantan province city of Palangka Raya, youths carrying placards marched through heavy smog caused by forest fires. Student volunteers also collect rubbish near a coastal areas of Banda Aceh and Surabaya as part of the global strike. In Makassar, students from the Briton English Education held a long march starting from Jl Lamaddukelleng (Lamaddukelleng Road) towards Mandala Monument. In Bandung, the climate strike jointly attended by students including kindergarten children, parents and the school staffs where activities on health and environment are being taught throughout the event.

=== Ireland ===
Over 20,000 protested in Ireland, including 10,000 to 15,000 in Dublin. Protests started from around midday in Dublin, Cork, Galway, Limerick, Waterford, Drogheda, Navan, Dundalk, Belfast and many other towns before marching to rallies in central locations.

=== Isle of Man ===
About 100 Manx school children protested for about an hour outside Tynwald in Douglas, the capital of Mann. An Extinction Rebellion flag was raised at the Peel Cathedral as a sign of support.

=== Israel ===
Hundreds of people, the majority of whom were students, protested in Tel-Aviv, Jerusalem and three more places. They were joined by a group of artists from the "Extinction Rebellion" movement that dressed in red to highlight the indifference to the extinction of endangered animals. Kahol Lavan lawmaker Miki Haimovich expressed solidarity with the protestors and the cause.

=== Italy ===
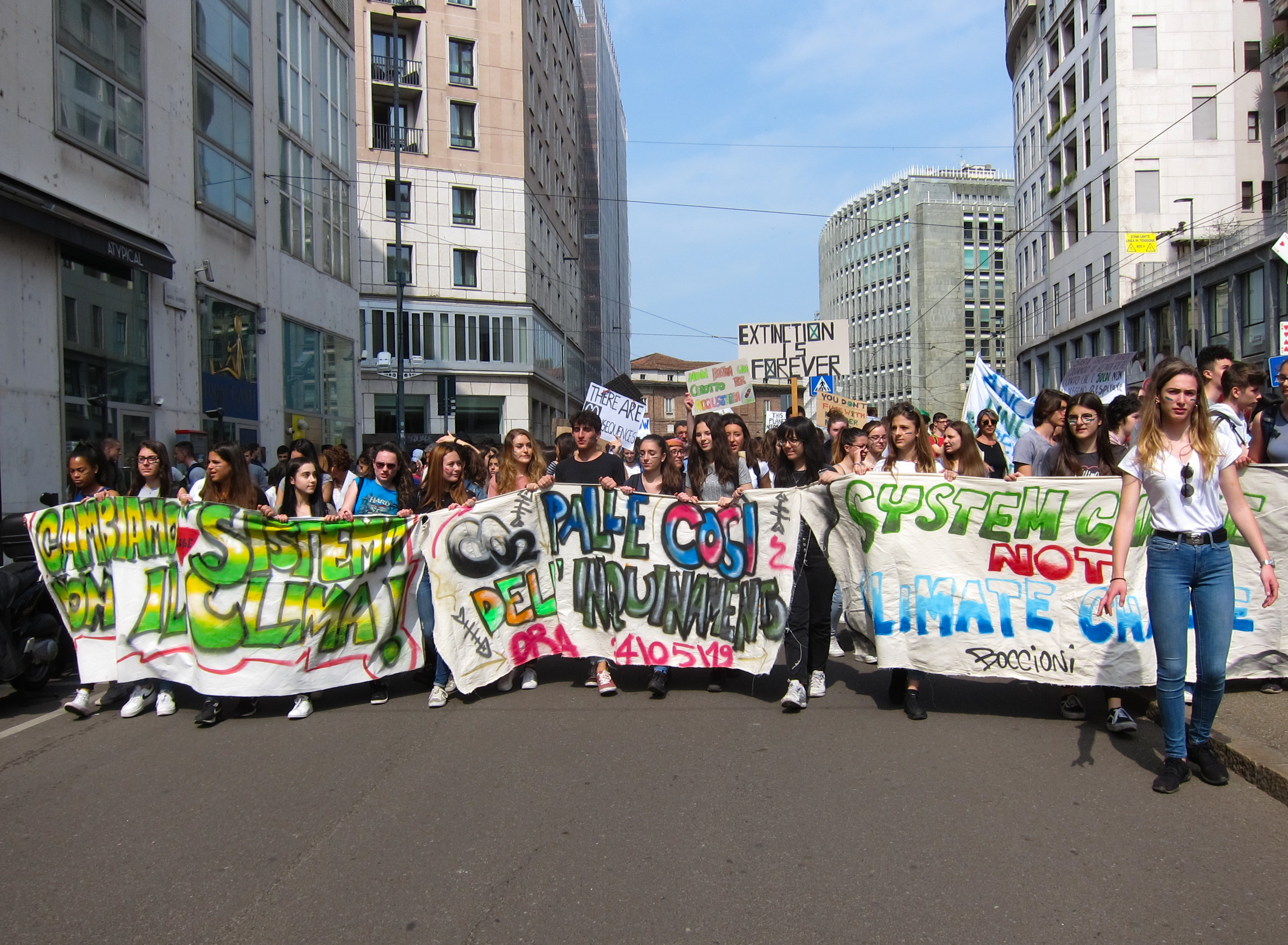
A "Fridays for Future" rally in Milan

On 27 September, more than one million people protested throughout 180 cities, mostly students. In Rome, more than 200,000 youth joined the protest. While almost 150,000 students gathered at the street of Milan for the third time after similar climate protests in the months of March and May. The student climate strike first meet in Largo Cairoli, a short walk from Sforza Castle before departing through the city. More than 50,000 people joined the protest both in Turin and Naples, while 20,000 students took part in Bologna's march.

Protests were praised by Prime Minister Giuseppe Conte, who tweeted: "The images of the squares of the Fridays for Future are extraordinary, with so many young people participating with such passion. From the government there is the utmost commitment to translate this request for change into concrete solutions. We all have a great responsibility."

=== Ivory Coast ===
In the Ivory Coast, protests took place against a proposed coal power plant in San Pédro.

=== Jamaica ===
The climate strike are being held differently in a Jamaican way with the main call are to protect the nature reserve of Cockpit Country.

=== Japan ===
Over a dozen rallies were held in Japan, including one in the Shibuya district in Tokyo, and the old capital of Kyoto.

=== Kenya ===
Kenyan protesters were specifically demanding an end to government plans to build new coal power stations.

=== Kiribati ===
A protest took place in Kiribati, where students held placards chanting "We are not sinking, we are fighting". The country is at great threat from rising sea levels.

=== Kosovo ===
The demonstrations took place in Kosovo's capital city of Pristina, organised jointly by the Termokiss community centre and GAIA Kosovo. The protestors highlighted the illegal construction of hydro power plants in the country national parks, the pollution of farmable land and the plans for the construction of a new coal-fired power plant.

=== Latvia ===
A gathering which were attended by mostly young people from rural schools were being held in the Vērmane Garden of Riga before they went on a walk to Vecrīga (Old Town). One of the participants explained that "The world is starting to change and going the wrong way, we need to start doing something to change it" with another urge the people in the highest authority to take the climate crisis seriously and that "When making decisions, politicians must first consider the impact on nature, subordinating everything else to environmental issues".

=== Lebanon ===
A number of school and university students demonstrated in Beirut to demand the government to take action as soon as possible to combat climate change and avoid an "environmental disaster".

=== Lithuania ===
Organised by Fridays for Future, climate rally was held in the Lithuania's capital city of Vilnius. Participants moved to the city Vincas Kudirka Square as well in Kaunas Town Hall in Kaunas carrying placards with words such as "Planet over profit $", "The world in your hands", "There's no planet B" and the "Global warming will touch you".

=== Luxembourg ===
More than 1,000 students gathered at the main square of the main railway station as part of the global climate strike and under the guidance of the police made their way on the road towards Glacis.

=== Malaysia ===
Protests were jointly held with an event on awareness on rapid climate change that included dialogue sessions, speeches and mini workshops in Malaysia's capital city of Kuala Lumpur as part of the global climate strike. More than 500 people took part in a march amid the 2019 Southeast Asian haze, jointly organised by Klima Action Malaysia (KAMY), Amnesty International (AI) and Greenpeace from Sogo shopping mall to Sultan Abdul Samad Building in Merdeka Square to calling for action against climate change and to hold the responsible people in the highest authority accountable for the destruction of the Earth's environment. In reference to Malaysia's recent democratic transition, the first in it its independent history, a protester openly stated that "It does not matter whether it is the old or new government, you have the right to overthrow whichever government who isn't concerned about the climate" while other protesters expressed through their placards with statement such as "Clean air for all", "We can't breathe money", "No other system except ecosystem" and "Worst housewarming party ever!!!".

In Sabah, nearly 100 people comprising organisations and individuals representing various civil society organisations in the state attended the climate strike held at the Pillars of Sabah in Kota Kinabalu with participants clad in green and black clothing with many wore face masks through the hazy situation. An open letter was delivered to the Chief Minister's office, urging the government to address issues within the palm oil industry; reassess the controversial multi-billion Tanjung Aru Eco Development (TAED) project and the Papar mega dam project; to reinforce carrying capacity on tourist arrivals to Sabah Parks islands, amongst others.

=== Malta ===
A protest of 300 people took place in Valletta, organised by members of Extinction Rebellion Malta. Protesters staged a die-in and asked the Maltese Parliament to declare climate emergency. The protest was endorsed by several NGOs and follows a series of others demanding climate justice.

=== Mexico ===
Across Mexico, 65 strikes were planned. Hundreds of young people in Mexico City joined their counterparts across the world in demonstrations against climate change. There were also demonstrations in the states of Guerrero, State of Mexico, Chiapas, and Quintana Roo. The Environmental Secretary (SEMARNAT) issued a statement that read, "En la #SEMARNAT reconocemos y respaldamos el llamado que el día de hoy las juventudes de todo el mundo lanzan a favor de la vida y para detener con urgencia los desequilibrios climáticos del planeta." ("In the #SEMARNAT we recognise and support the call that today young people from all over the world launch in favour of life and to urgently stop the climatic imbalances of the planet.") The young people who belong to Fridays For Future have also been critical to the environmental policy of the Mexican government under Andrés Manuel López Obrador, which has opted for mega projects on development and momentum of fossil energies through the country state-owned oil company of Pemex despite the questions from activists, native peoples and academics.

=== Montenegro ===
Dozens of people marched through the city of Podgorica, Montenegro's capital, on 20 September. The protesters specifically demanded more action to protect the environment and address pollution.

=== Morocco ===
A youth march took place in Marrakesh with further youth rallies of the World Climate Week held on 27 September in several locations across Morocco's including in Casablanca, Demnate, Fez and in Morocco's capital of Rabat, organised jointly by the Association of Teachers of Life Sciences and Earth (ATLSE) in Morocco with Greenpeace.

=== Myanmar ===
Environmental activists from Myanmar have joined the movement since the global climate strike movement began on 24 May as Myanmar is particularly prone to the negative consequences of climate change and natural disasters, from the extremes of flooding to drought, which further exacerbated by human's activities. In line with the global climate strike, more than 200 protestors gathered in front of Bogyoke Market and marched to Sule Pagoda and Maha Bandula Park in downtown Yangon while carrying placards to calling for a concerted effort by government and business to deal with the global crisis, urging the government to put a definite end to big infrastructure projects, such as the Myitsone Dam in Kachin State which could damage the environment.

=== Nepal ===
Nepal hosts 118 ecosystems, 75 categories of vegetation, and 35 types of forests. Recent disasters including a storm that killed over 25 people in April, flash floods that killed hundreds, and unusual weather patterns, have reportedly alarmed the Nepalese. Different national and international organisations support Nepal to initiate program for global climate change. Some people marched with placards about the care of the environment.

=== Netherlands ===
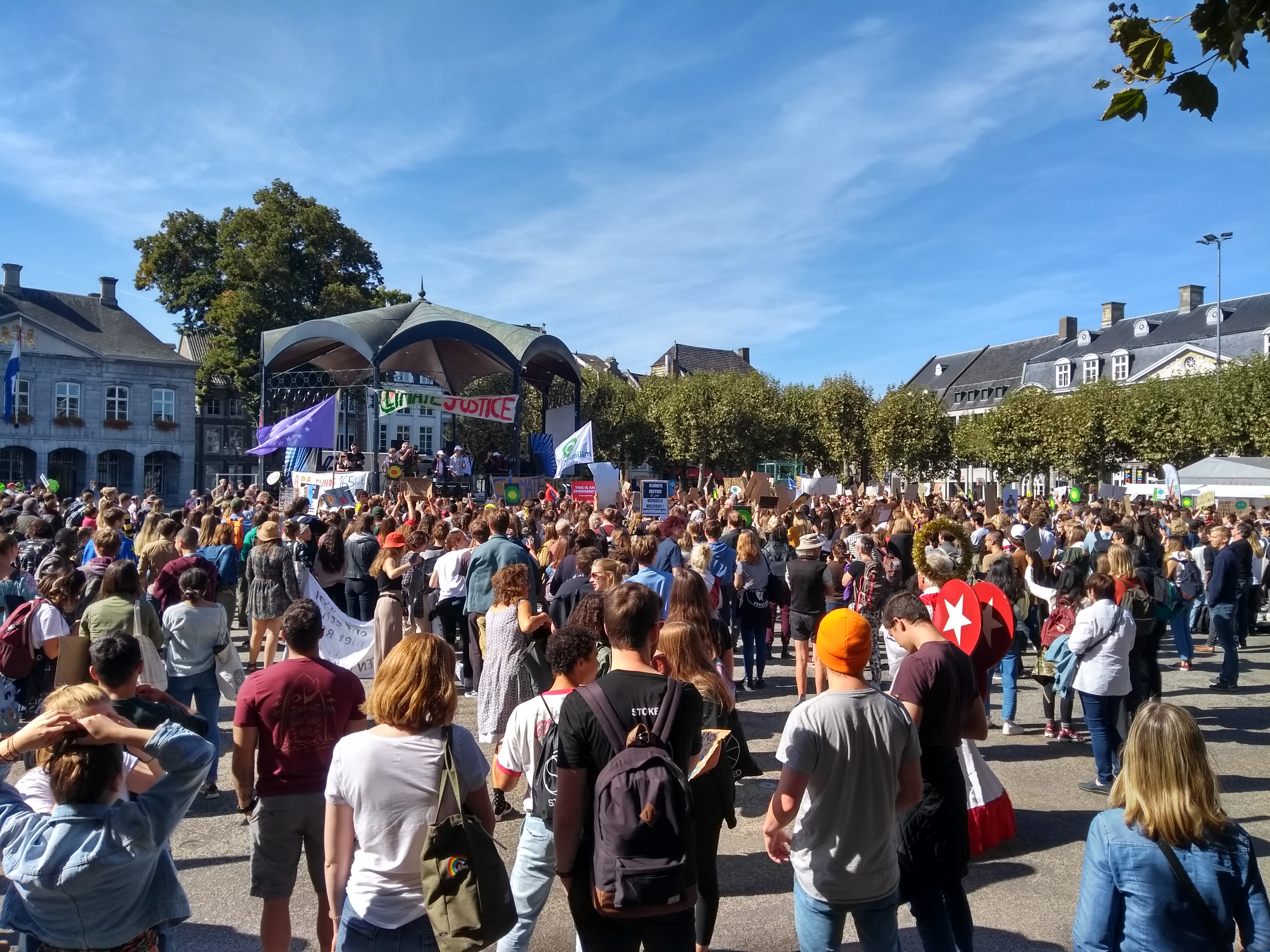
Protesters in Maastricht on 20 September

On 20 September, climate strikes took place in multiple locations in the Netherlands, including Amsterdam and Maastricht. At the march starting in Amsterdam's Dam Square, it was reported by police that about 6,000 individuals were present, with many having either received permission from the schools to attend, write a motivational/argumentative letter for why they were attending, or show photographic proof they were there. At the march starting in Maastricht's Vrijthof square, it was reported in the press that about 2,000 or 2,500 individuals were present.

On 27 September, a national climate strike was organised in The Hague. Attendance estimates range from 15,000 to over 30,000.

=== New Zealand ===
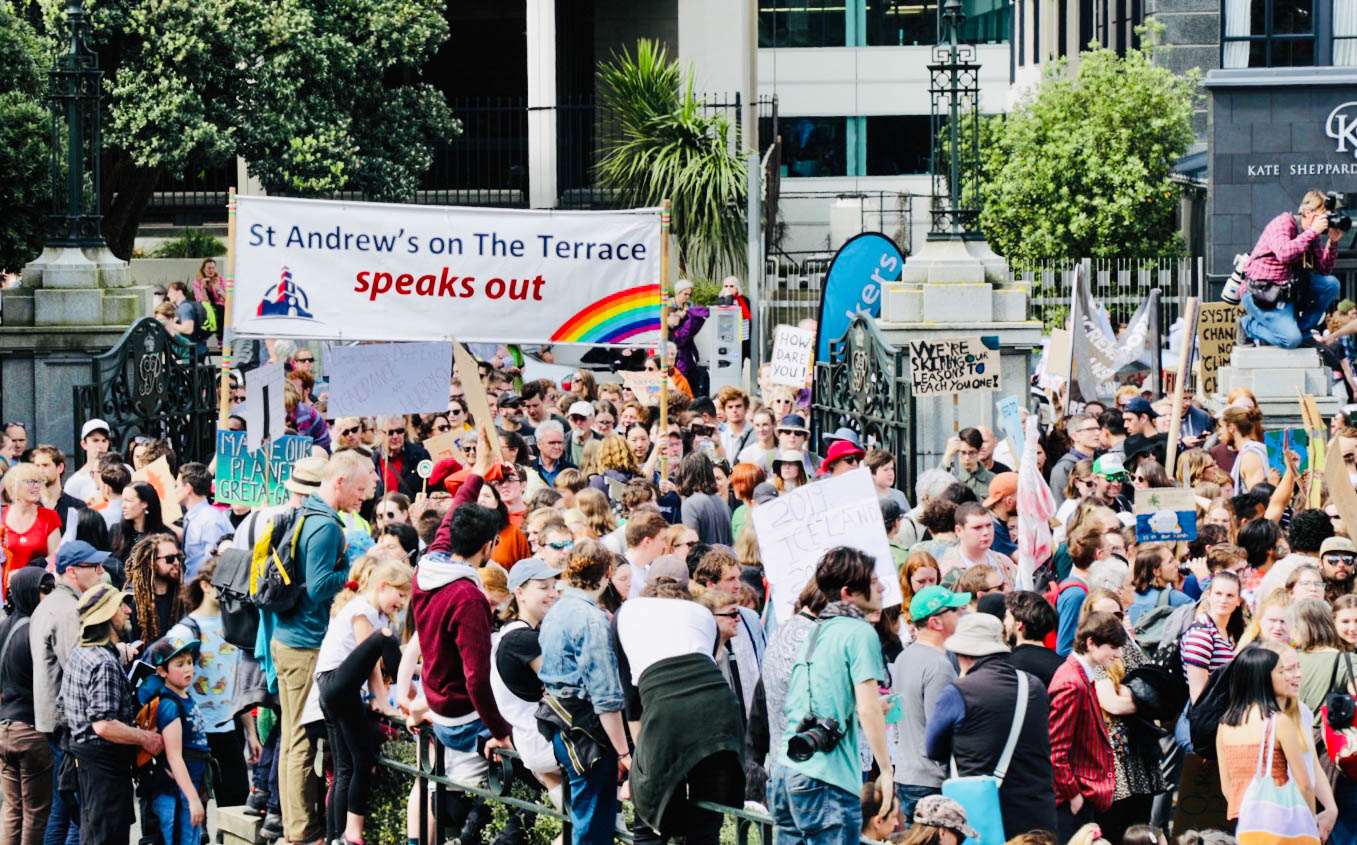
Protesters in Wellington on 27 September

In New Zealand, the strikes have occurred for multiple weeks prior to the nationwide school and intergenerational strikes on 27 September. The New Zealand protests were delayed by a week to allow students to sit exams the previous Friday. At least three female students shaved their heads to raise money for the Amazon, alongside the 20 September strike, which was organised as Marist College had exams planned on 27 September. On 27 September, an estimated 170,000 people including school students participated in 40 events in urban centres across New Zealand – roughly 3.5% of the country's population; turnout figures exceeded 80,000 in Auckland and about 40,000 attended the demonstration in Wellington (almost 20% of the city's population). In addition, New Zealand's universities and 260 local businesses participated in the climate strike. An open letter signed by 11,000 New Zealanders was delivered to Parliament on 27 September, urging the government to declare a national climate emergency.

=== Nigeria ===
Multiple strikes took place in Nigeria. Turnout of the protests were reportedly low in Lagos, Nigeria's largest city. However more people were protesting in Abuja, numbering over a hundred.

=== North Macedonia ===
Citizens of the North Macedonia held a climate protest in the capital city of Skopje.

=== Pakistan ===
Thousands of Pakistanis including students, environmentalists, celebrities and politicians joined the protests which took place across 32 towns and cities in Pakistan. Major rallies were held in Karachi, Lahore, Islamabad, Peshawar, Quetta and Gilgit.

In Karachi, protesters gathered in front of the Frere Hall and addressed by activists including Sheema Kermani.

In Lahore, a protest was held in front of Lahore Press Club, led by climate activist Meherbano Raja. "It will be youth led because they are the most affected generation and so they will be leading from the front", said Ms. Raja.

=== Panama ===
A demonstration was held on the grounds of the Legislative Park on 5 May, starring young people and representatives of various Panamanian environmental groups, who gathered this global call to raise their voice and raise awareness in the authorities and in the population on the damages caused to the environment. Grecia Medina, director of development of the National Association for the Conservation of Nature (ANCON), said that it seeks to take actions for the climate through this concentration.

=== Papua New Guinea ===
The students of Lae Christian Academy secondary schools held a strike and participate in an event held by a non-profit organisation, Pacific Rawa at their school with one of the students calling the central government as well the authorities of Morobe Province and the city of Lae to stop a coal-fire power project that will be built in the area.

=== Peru ===
Thousands of students, schoolchildren and young people march in the country, with the majority in Peru's capital city of Lima and Madre de Dios through the Interfaith Rainforest Initiative (IRI) movement as part of the global strike with the aim of demanding public policies against climate change and raising public awareness on the global problem. One of the youngster said "We want life and a world where our young people can live in harmony with each other and with the planet" with other messages such as "Be part of the solution", "We are nature defending itself" and "Time is running out".

=== Philippines ===
More than 600 young environmentalists took part in a rally in the capital city of Manila, forming a human-Earth formation while carrying placards for climate justice where they denounced the rising number of extrajudicial killings of environmental and land rights activists under the government of President Rodrigo Duterte who came to power in 2016. A total of 17 strikes were registered in the country. Filipino activists also marched in honor of those who were killed for defending the environment. The Guardian reported in 2018 that the Philippines is the deadliest country for those defending the environment and land. Some 10,000 people also swept across a long stretch of beach on heavily polluted Manila Bay, clutching sacks they filled with rubbish as part of the global strike.

=== Poland ===
Thousands of school children joined adults in protests in Warsaw, while protests also took place in other cities. Poland produces 80 percent of its electricity from coal. For years the country has been careful about climate targets. Coal mining is responsible for tens of thousands of jobs in the south of the country. Poland presently plans to phase out coal power plants by 2050. Many middle schools gave students the day off to participate.

Poland, the Czech Republic, Hungary, and Estonia blocked an attempt by French President Emmanuel Macron to commit the European Union to carbon neutrality by 2050.

=== Portugal ===
Hundreds of students in Portugal's capital city of Lisbon to a demand for environmental measures from the government including for the closure of coal and gas power stations in the country as well several other issues on Portugal environment.

=== Romania ===
Protests on the climate awareness took place in Bucharest, Timișoara, Iași, Cluj-Napoca, Târgu Jiu and Craiova.

=== Russia ===
Despite the independent nature and disconnect to the climate strike movement, protests on the similar topics took place in more than 30 cities across the country, beginning with a small scale rally in Russia's capital city of Moscow, continuing with Saint Petersburg and other cities and towns, most notably in the north-west. 13 protests took place in Arkhangelsk Oblast where local residents have been protesting for more than a year against the construction of a large landfill in the vicinity of the Shies railway station.

=== San Marino ===
Students and young people took to the streets in the San Marino on 27 September. The march started in Piazza Grande in Borgo Maggiore and ended in Piazza della Libertà. A delegation of Fridays for Future San Marino met with the Captains Regent.

=== Senegal ===
An estimated 200 students protested in Dakar.

=== Serbia ===
A group of activists from the Serb branch of Fridays for Future co-operated with the Green Youth of Serbia to organised a walk from Terazije to Student Square and Republic Square in the Serbia's capital city of Belgrade, with lectures on climate change and sustainable cities.

=== Singapore ===
A total of more than 1,700 participants decked in red colour, mostly youth, gathered at Hong Lim Park through the hazy season with placards such as "Don't burn my future" and "O-Levels are soon, so is this irreversible climate crisis" to express their concerns and raise more awareness on the rapid climate change to urge for a systematic change from the government as well as corporations on the basis that individual efforts were not sufficient as part of the global climate strike. It is known as the first climate protest held in Singapore. Prime Minister Lee Hsien Loong previously stated that the government would commit $100 billion in long-term investments to tackle climate change in general and rising sea levels in particular.

=== Slovakia ===
Climate strikes took place in Žilina, Banská Bystrica, Nitra and Košice. Before the main gathering in Slovakia's capital city of Bratislava, Comenius University organised its own march from Šafárikovo Square to Námestie Slobody (Freedom Square) with about 5,000 people came to the Freedom Square and then moved through the Palisády Street in front of Parliament building. Along the way, they said "Let's change the system, not the climate".

=== Slovenia ===
Climate strikes were held across the country from Maribor, to the coastal cities.

=== Solomon Islands ===
In the Solomon Islands, protesters symbolically took to the seas rather than the streets, as the low-lying nation is at great risk from rising sea levels.

=== South Africa ===
Across South Africa, 18 protests took place, including protests organised by the African Climate Alliance. A total of 5,000 people were estimated to have taken part, according to organisers. The strikes were supported by numerous organisations, including Earthlife Africa, 350Africa.org, the South African Food Sovereignty Campaign, the Co-operative and Policy Alternative Center, and Greenpeace. They were also endorsed by the South African Federation of Trade Unions. Protests took place at the headquarters of energy company Sasol, with protesters calling on Sasol to provide "a just transition plan that meets the needs of workers, affected communities, the country, the continent and the world".

=== South Korea ===
Protest are being held in South Korea's capital city of Seoul with people consisting of 330 groups from all walks of life held a "9•21 Climate Crisis Emergency Action" rally in Seoul National University Road, criticising the government that is silent on the climate crisis, and companies that emit multiple greenhouse gases. In a quiet protest at the capital, activists flashed environmentalist messages in Morse code using LED. The protester demanded the government to recognise the truth and declare an emergency with an estimated 5,000 people gathered at the meeting. Participants attended the meeting with placards such as "Tomorrow's hope begins today" and "If you don't act now, there is no future". Similar protests also being held in 10 regions across the country, including Busan, Daegu and Changwon.

=== Spain ===
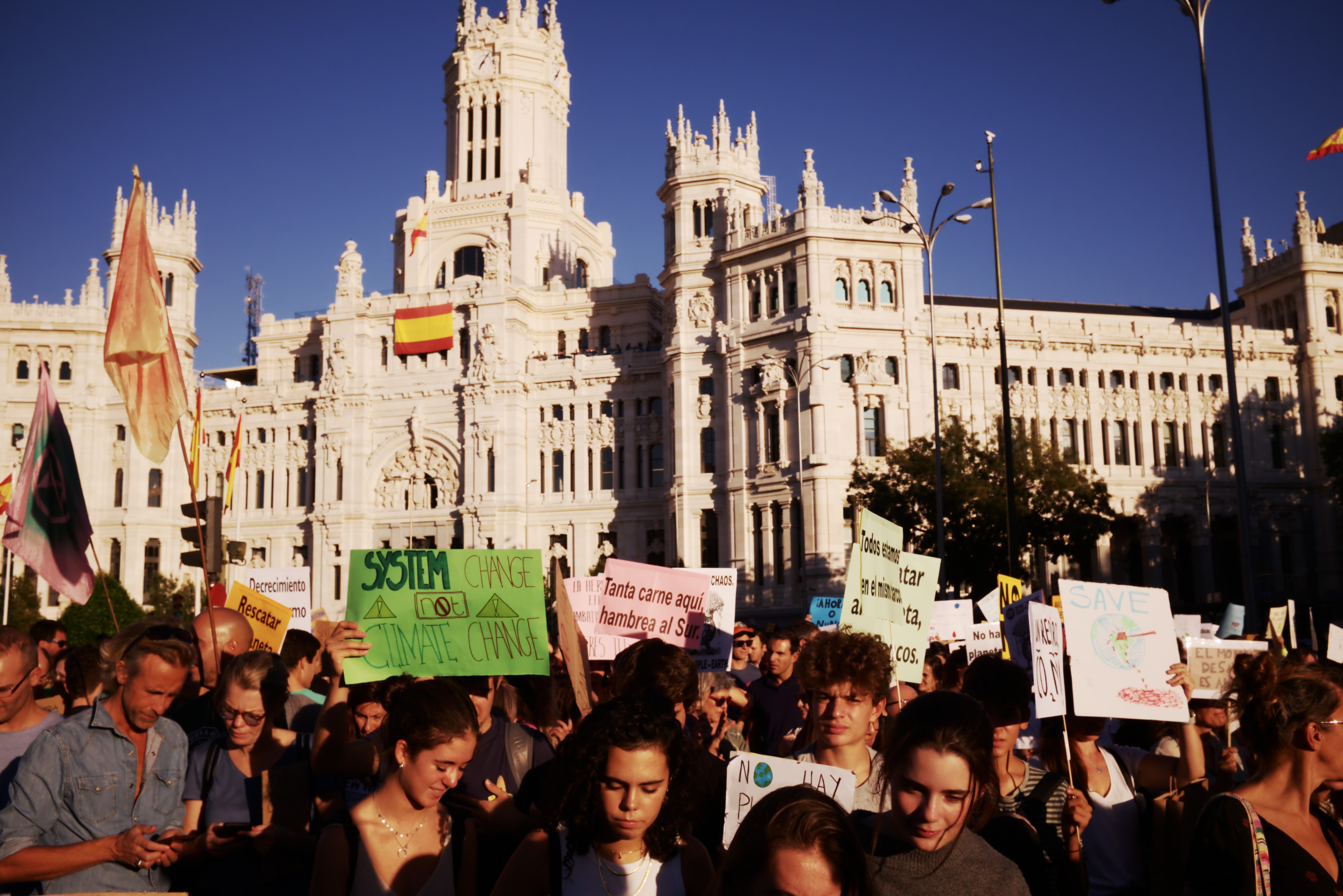
Protesters in Madrid

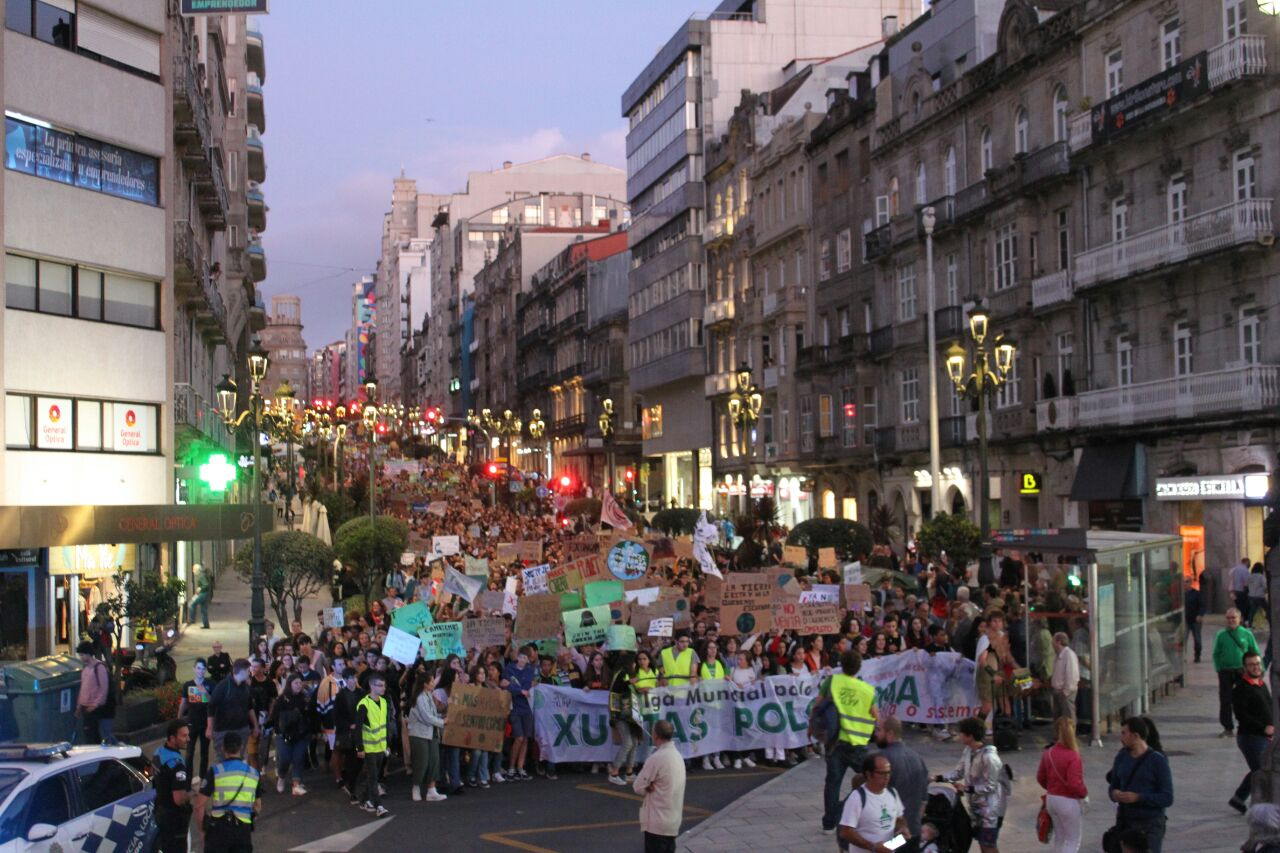
Protesters in Vigo

On 20 September protesters in Madrid, Barcelona, Málaga, Granada and other Spanish cities and towns joined the strike. Numerous strikes took place on 27 September, with protests in cities like Madrid, Barcelona, Vigo, Zaragoza, Valladolid, Santander, Toledo, Salamanca or Ávila.

=== Sweden ===
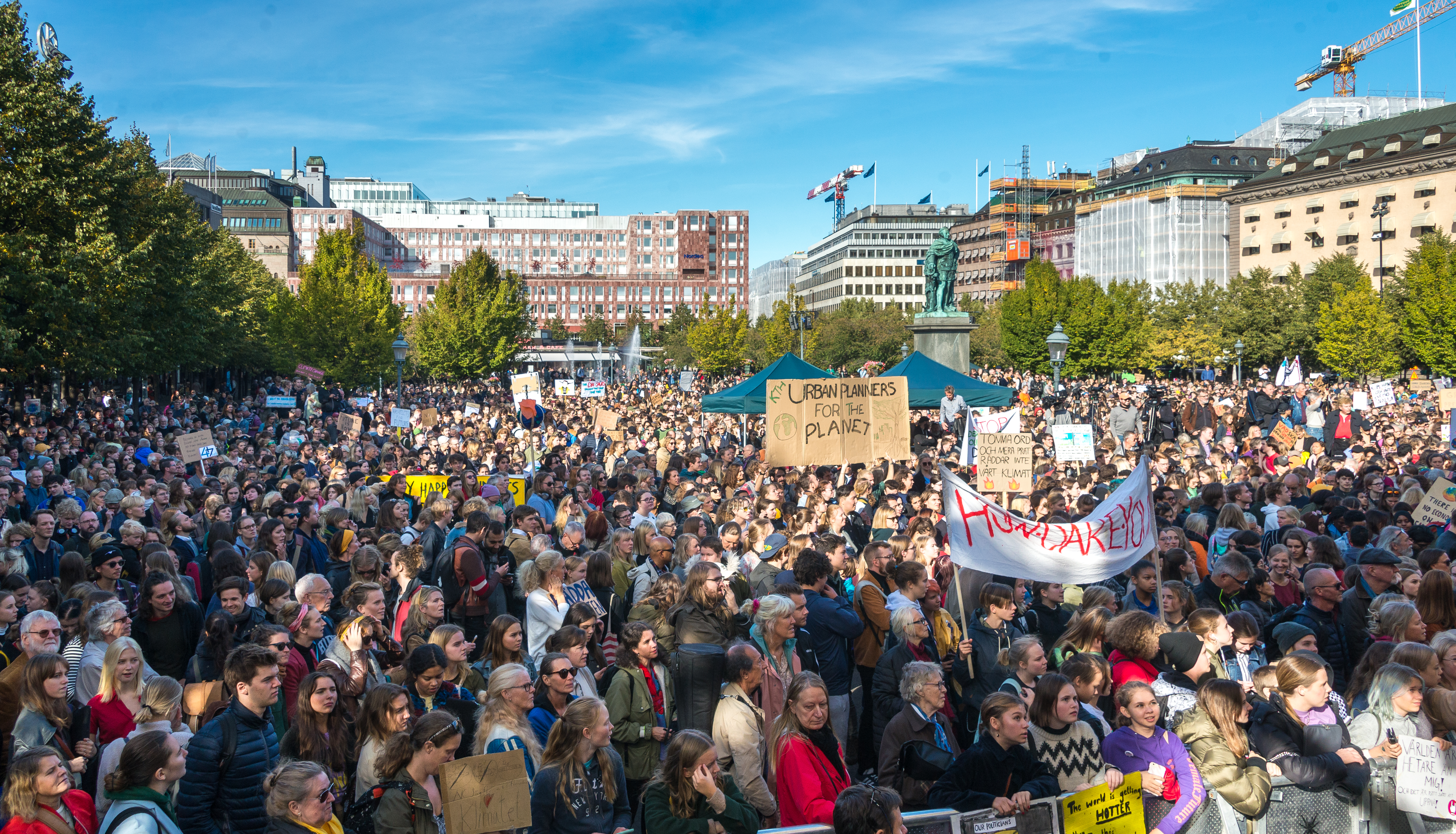
Protestors in Stockholm

On 20 September, a climate march from Mynttorget to Kungsträdgården occurred in Stockholm, Sweden. Greta Thunberg's speech in New York City was broadcast to Sweden over a widescreen. On 27 September the climate strike week was completed with tens of thousands of people, including performances in Kungsträdgården by Hoffmaestro & Chraa and Robyn.

=== Switzerland ===
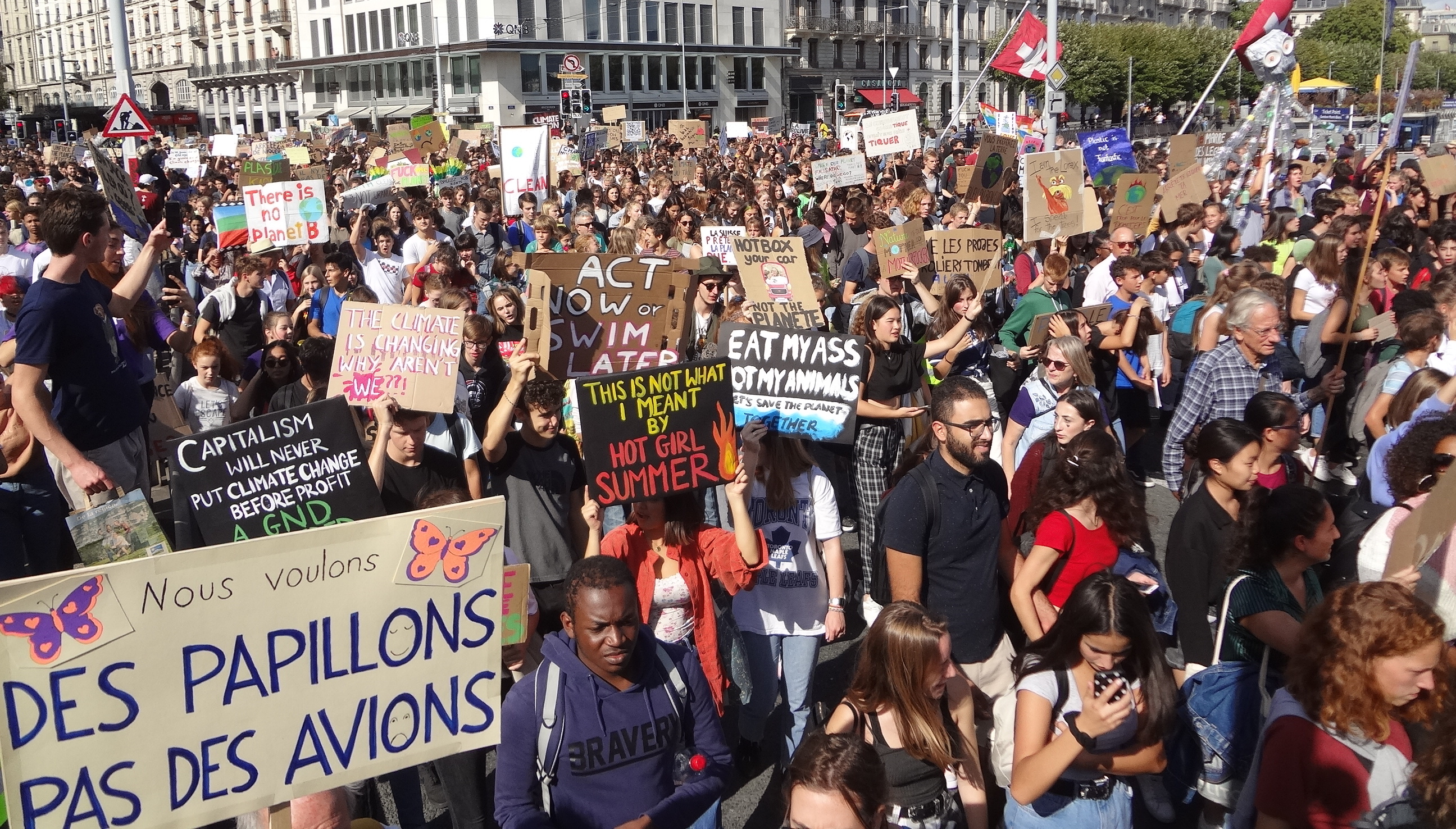
Protesters in Genève

Around 2,000 people took part in climate demonstrations in the cities of Basel, St. Gallen and Lausanne on 20 September. One speaker told the crowd during the rally that "We must convince everyone now that we have to act in favour of the climate. The crisis concerns us all, whether we are from the right or the left". The crowds also criticised the lack of action by Swiss politicians, banks and big business on the rapid climate change. In Zürich, an estimated 5,000 people went on strike. In Lausanne, roughly 3,500 people took part in demonstrations, including the winner of the 2017 Nobel Prize in Chemistry, Jacques Dubochet. Activists claimed over 100,000 attended the national protest held in Bern in the afternoon of 28 September, while local police did not provide an estimate of attendees. Thousands arrived by train or bicycles.

Ahead of the U.N. 2019 climate conference, Swiss food company Nestlé said it wanted to become carbon neutral by 2050.

=== Taiwan ===
A protest was held by students in Taiwan's capital city of Taipei which is jointly organised with other activities, calling on the 2020 presidential candidates to take more specific measures for climate change.

=== Tanzania ===
A march took place in Dar es Salaam, headed by a marching band.

=== Thailand ===
Students and environmentalists from Thailand have gone on climate strike since March 2019. On 20 September, more than 200 people stormed Thailand's environment ministry building in the capital city of Bangkok and played dead while chanting "save our Earth". The protestors submitted a petition asking the government to phase out coal and transition to renewable energy where it was received by a government official who subsequently lauded the concern of young people for the environment. The Varee Chiangmai International School in Chiang Mai Province held a climate event from 20 to 27 September which began with a school clean up day as well as rubbish picking in the Nong Hoi community and Ping River as part of World Cleanup Day.

=== Trinidad and Tobago ===
A total of 30 coastal clean-ups was held in conjunction of the International Coastal Clean-up with a gathering in Queen's Park Savannah and subsequent rally being held in Port of Spain.

=== Tunisia ===
A number of school and university students demonstrated in Tunisia to demand the authorities to take action to combat climate change and avoid an "environmental disaster".

=== Turkey ===
According to organisers, 10,000 protesters went on strike in Turkey. The focal points of the protests in Turkey were in Istanbul's Kadıköy and Şişli districts. The teenage climate activists were led by 13-year-old Atlas Sarrafoğlu and 18-year-old Selin Gören.

=== Uganda ===
In Uganda's capital Kampala, protests against climate change were joined by hundreds of Ugandan children. It was also joined by the country's most high-profile youth activist, Leah Namurgewa, who is 15.

=== Ukraine ===
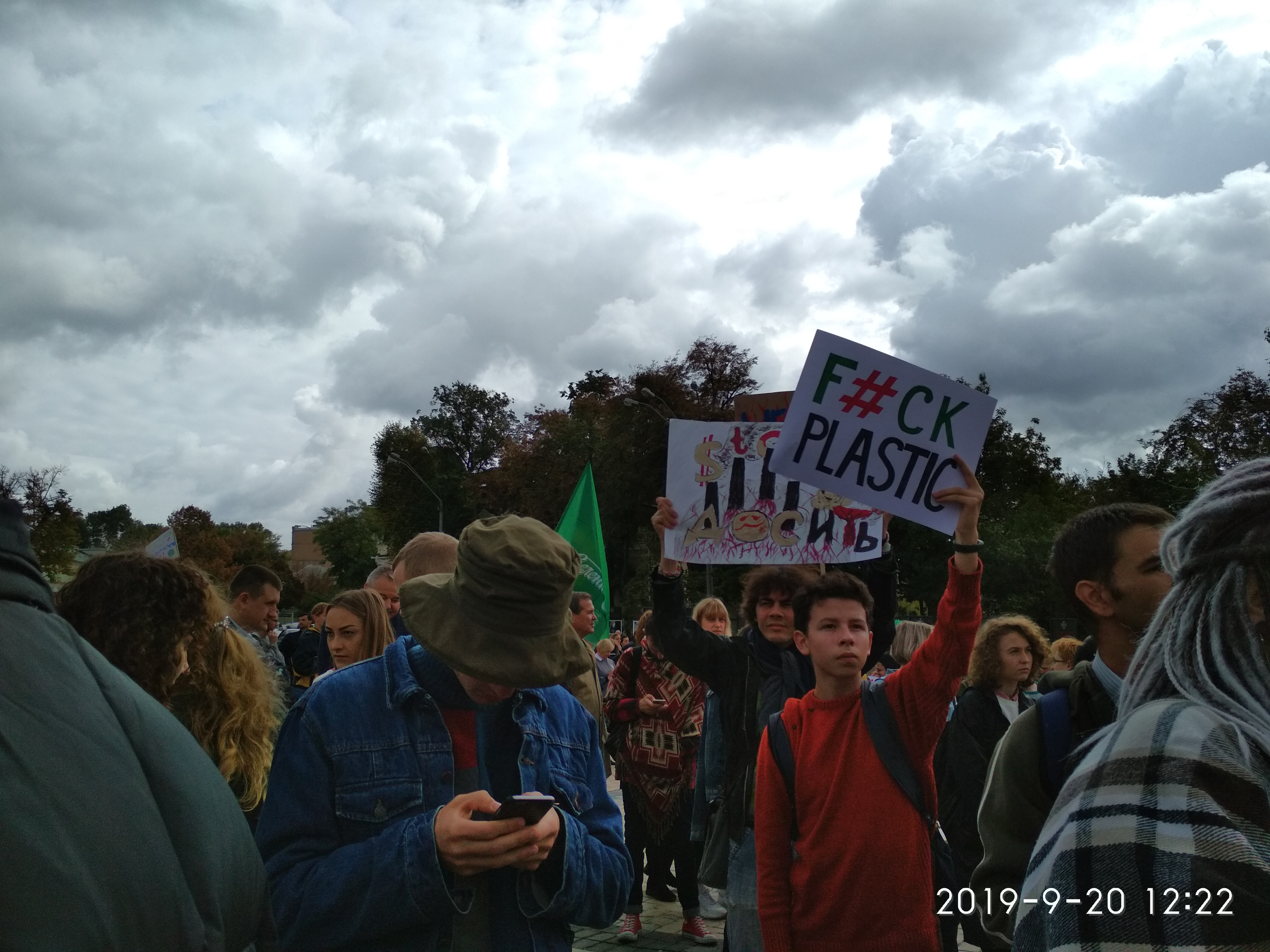
Protest in Kyiv

A march took place in Kyiv in which a thousand people participated, mostly youth. An estimated 2,600 people protested across the country, according to organisers.

=== United Kingdom ===
Local groups of youth climate activists organised over 200 events across the United Kingdom for 20 September, with umbrella campaign groups Scottish Youth Climate Strike (SYCS) in Scotland, UK Student Climate Network (UKSCN) in England and Wales, and Youth Climate Association Northern Ireland in Northern Ireland making demands to respective governments on the back of these protests. The strikes were supported by trade unions, the University and College Union, Unite the Union, and the Trades Union Congress. The Co-operative Bank collaborated with Unite to allow its workforce to strike. However, teachers were warned that encouraging students to strike or failing to record student absences could lead to legal or disciplinary action. Protestors who illegally blocked Lambeth Bridge were arrested by police.

In the lead up to the strike, Joshua Curiel, student and climate activist, wrote a piece in The Guardian calling for a public information campaign on how to halt the climate crisis – in a similar fashion to Make Do and Mend and Dig for Victory.

Organisers said that roughly 300,000 people participated in strikes across the country, with 100,000 attendees of a London rally, where politician Jeremy Corbyn gave a speech in which he told the young people in attendance: "you and a whole generation have brought the issue centre stage and I am absolutely delighted about that". Protests in Edinburgh and Brighton reached 20,000 and 10,000 participants, respectively. On 21 September, Extinction Rebellion activists blocked streets at Dover in a protest which led to the arrest of 10 people.

Following the strike, there was a global week of action, although outwith Scotland there was not much action in the UK. Notably, Scottish Youth Climate Strike pulled off an entire week of actions and events including bringing together communities across the country in a single people's declaration to all parties in the Scottish Parliament.

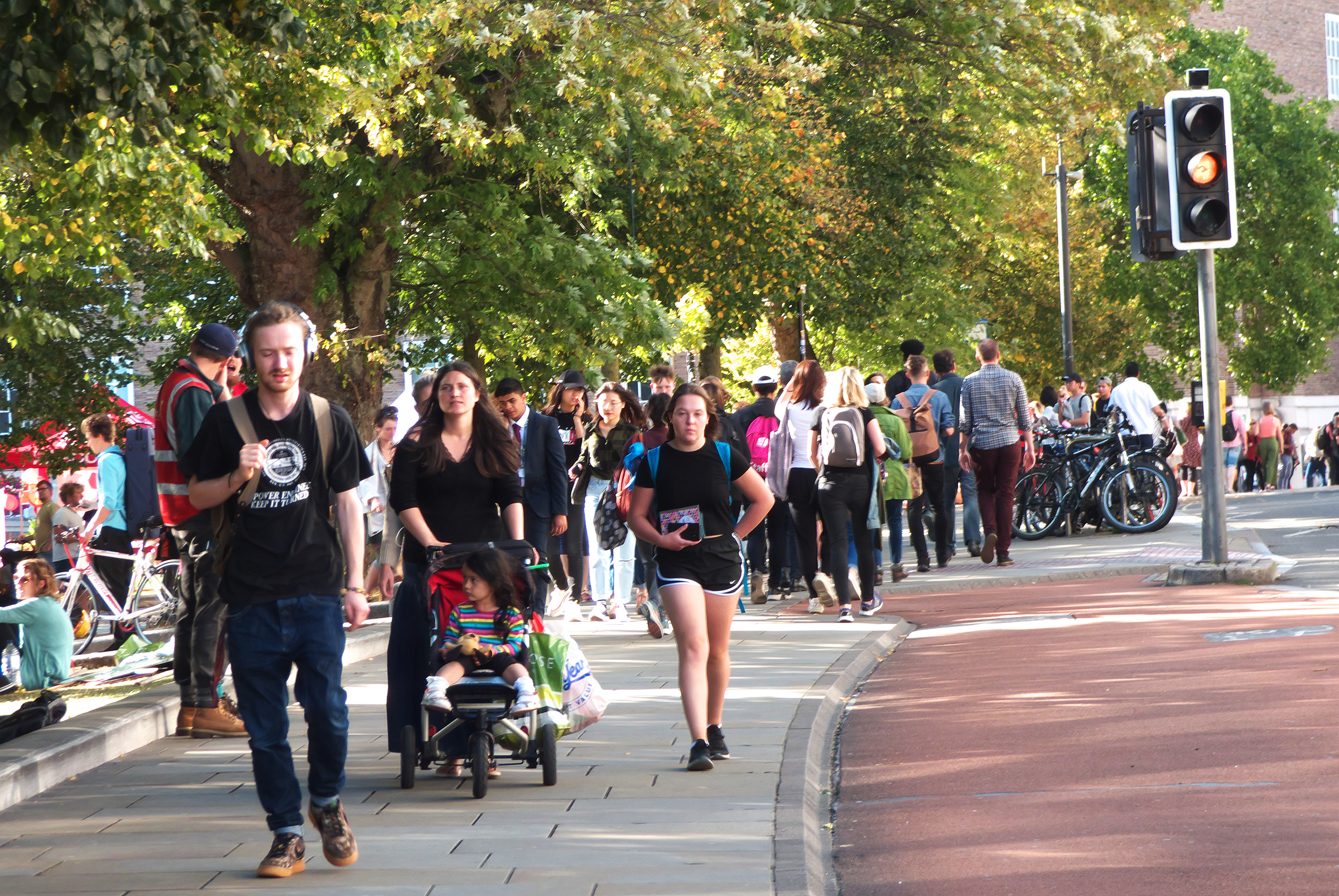
Protest in Bristol

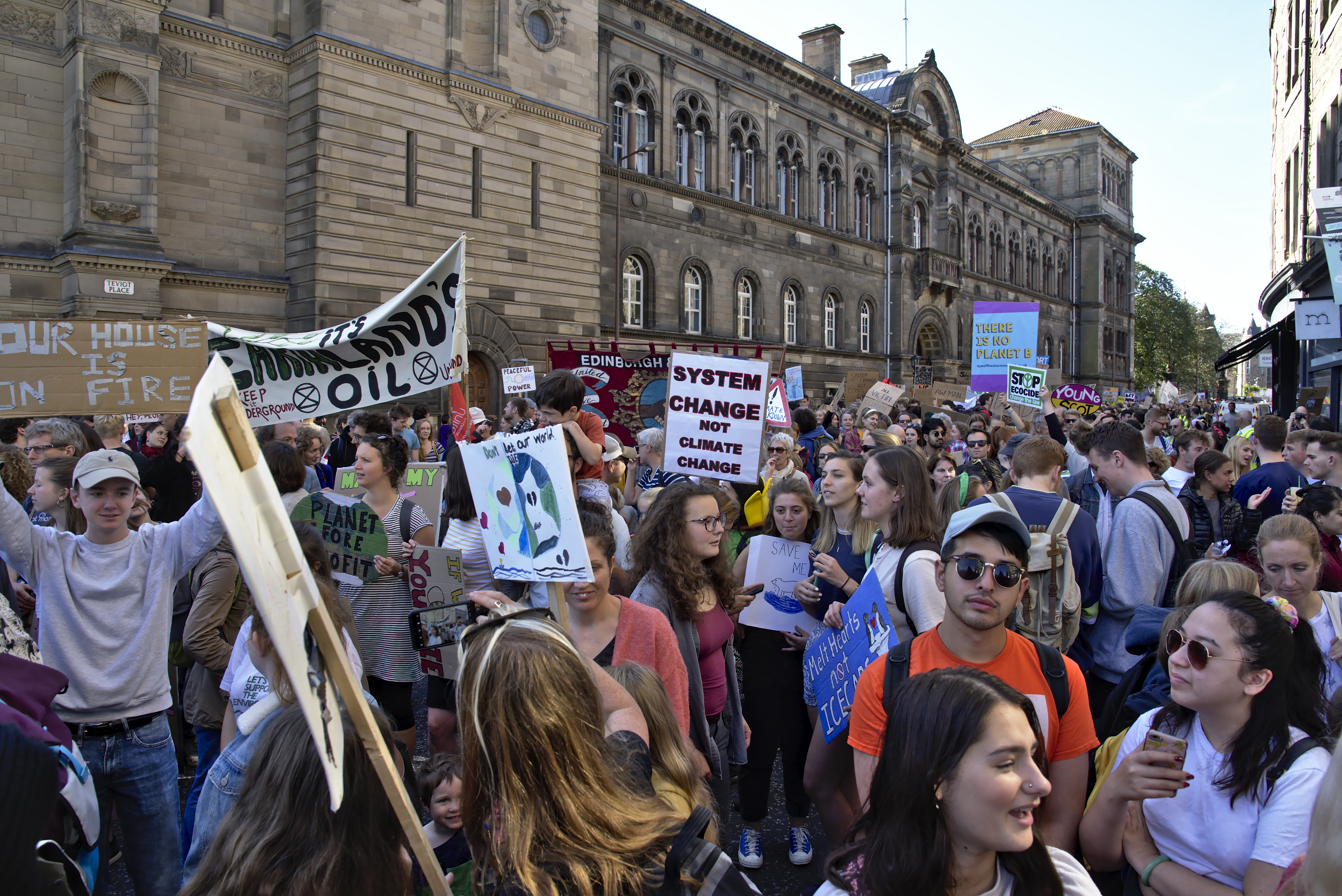
Protest in Edinburgh

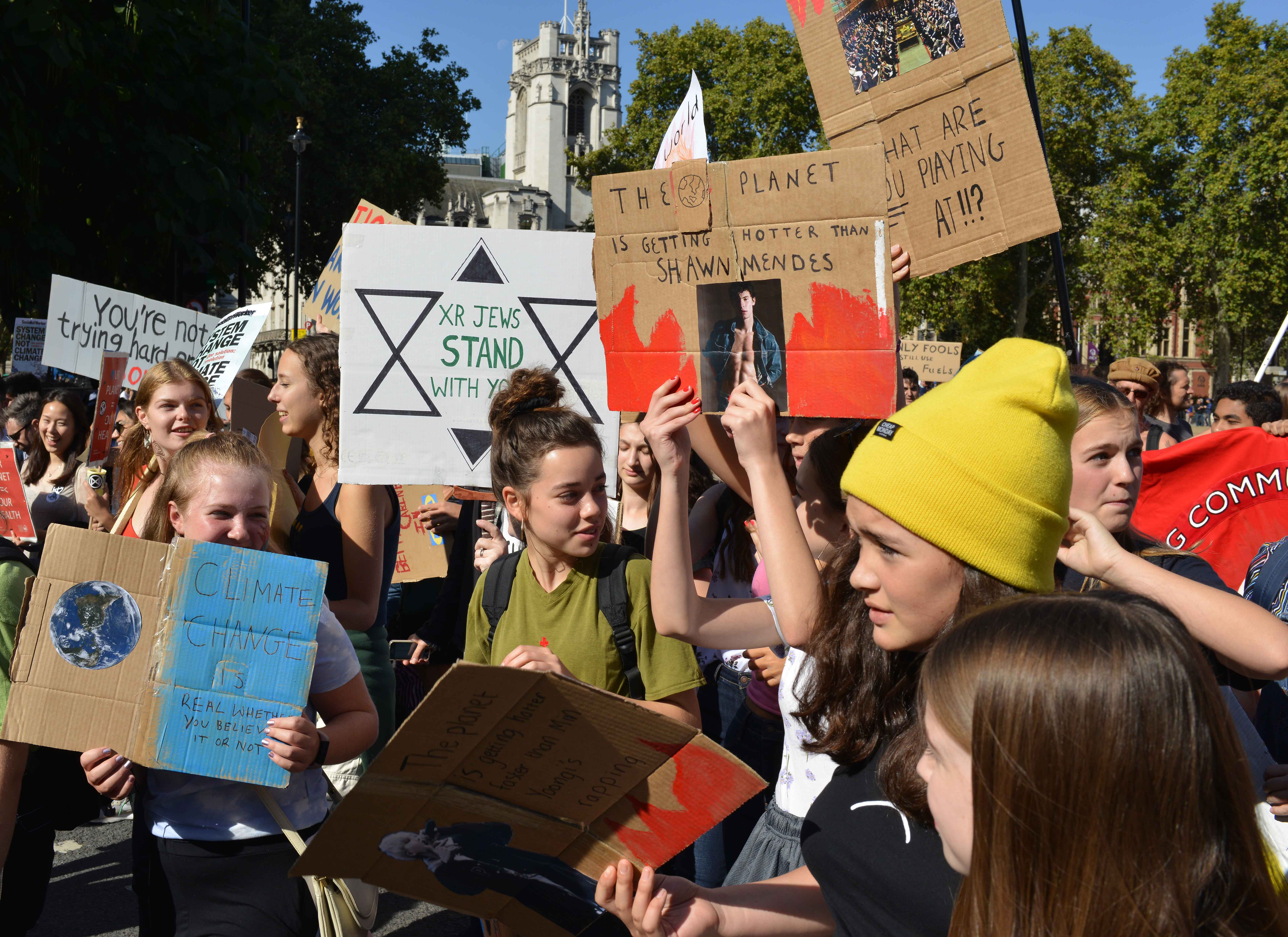
Protest in London

=== United States ===
The event is one of the largest climate mobilizations in US history. Over 1,000 strike events were planned in all 50 states, Puerto Rico, and the District of Columbia. The US Youth Climate Strike Coalition, an alliance of eight US-based youth-led climate groups came together through the mobilization of Future Coalition to plan the US marches. Upon launch, the Coalition posted a series of five demands directed at world leaders and elected officials:

- "A Green New Deal: Building on "the" Green New Deal resolution in Congress, this calls for transforming the economy to 100% renewable energy by 2030, while creating jobs and ending leases and permits for fossil fuel projects.
- Respect for indigenous land and sovereignty: Honoring treaties protecting indigenous land by ending resource extraction in and affecting those areas.
- Environmental justice: Investing in the communities affected most by poverty and pollution.
- Protecting biodiversity: Protecting and restoring 50% of the world's lands and oceans and stopping all deforestation by 2030.
- Sustainable agriculture: Investing in regenerative agriculture and ending subsidies for industrial agriculture."

The New York City Department of Education, with more than one million students, gave permission for youth to skip school for the day to participate in the strike; Boston Public Schools followed suit, while Chicago Public Schools announced they would not mark students absent if they returned after the strike. Several school districts in the D.C. metropolitan area also excused students to strike with parental permission.

In a protest in the Battery, Manhattan, on 20 September, Swedish climate activist Greta Thunberg spoke, having sailed to the US across the Atlantic in August 2019. An estimated 250,000 people attended the rallies across New York.

Numerous businesses including Ben & Jerry's, Patagonia, and Lush Cosmetics announced they would be closed on 20 September to support the strike. Over 1,700 Amazon employees signed an internal petition pledging to walk out over Amazon's lack of action on climate change. A day before the strike, Amazon CEO, Jeff Bezos, unveiled an extensive new plan to tackle climate change and committed to meet the goals of the UN's Paris Agreement ten years ahead of schedule.

Members of Young Evangelicals for Climate Change participated at about a dozen colleges and universities, with a message of creation care and a faith-based approach to "speaking up for people's right to clean air and water and a stable climate."

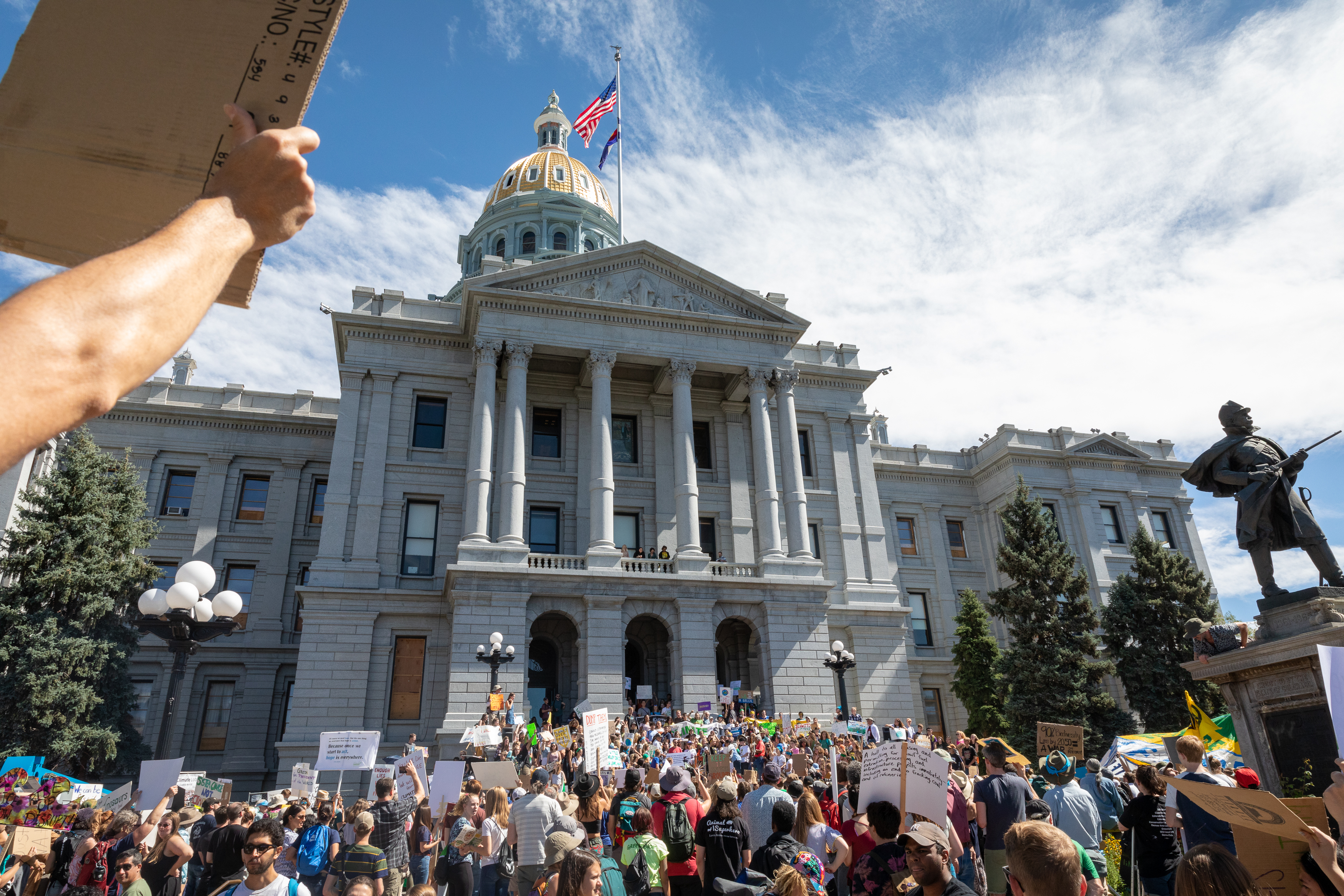
Protest in Denver, Colorado

Protest in Burlington, Vermont

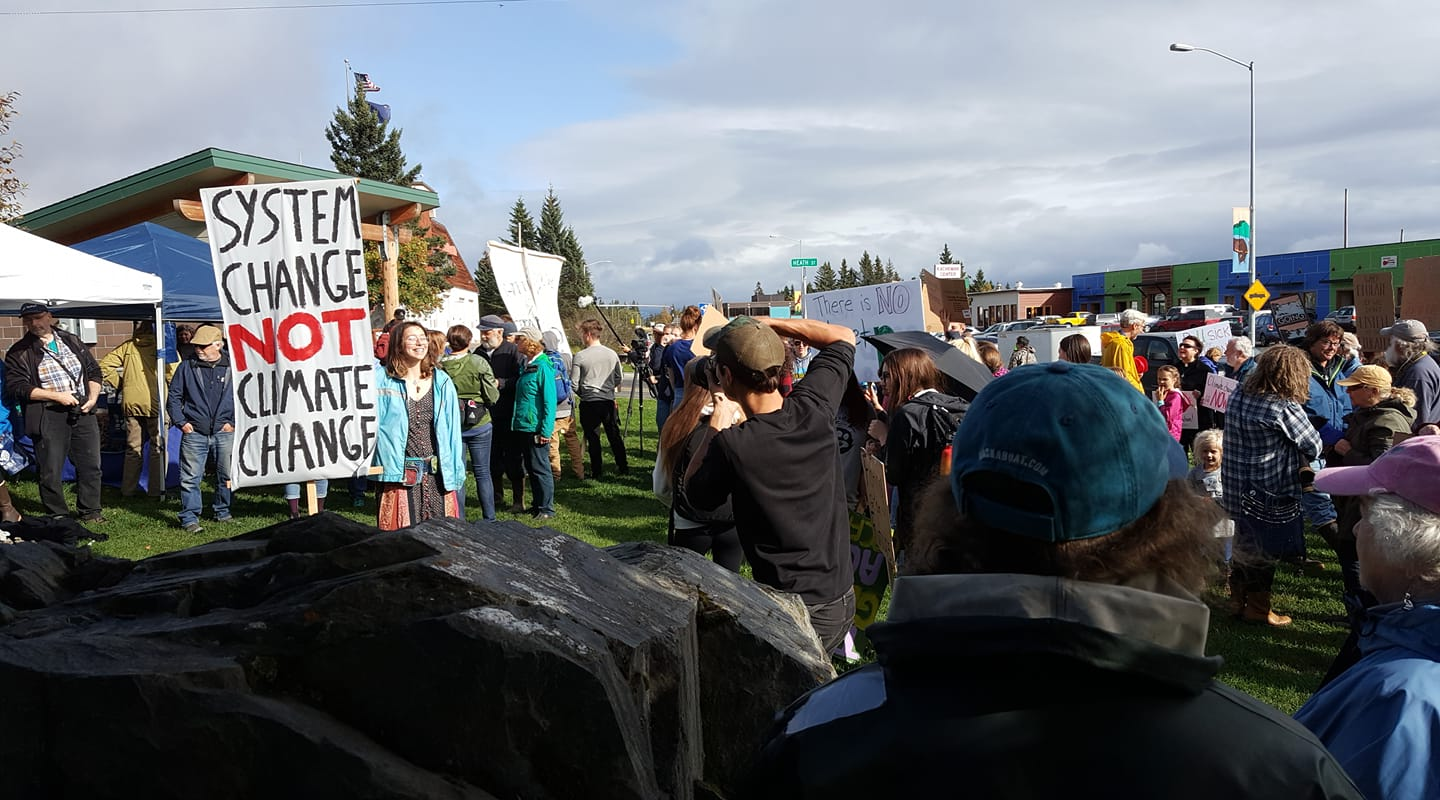
Protest in Homer, Alaska

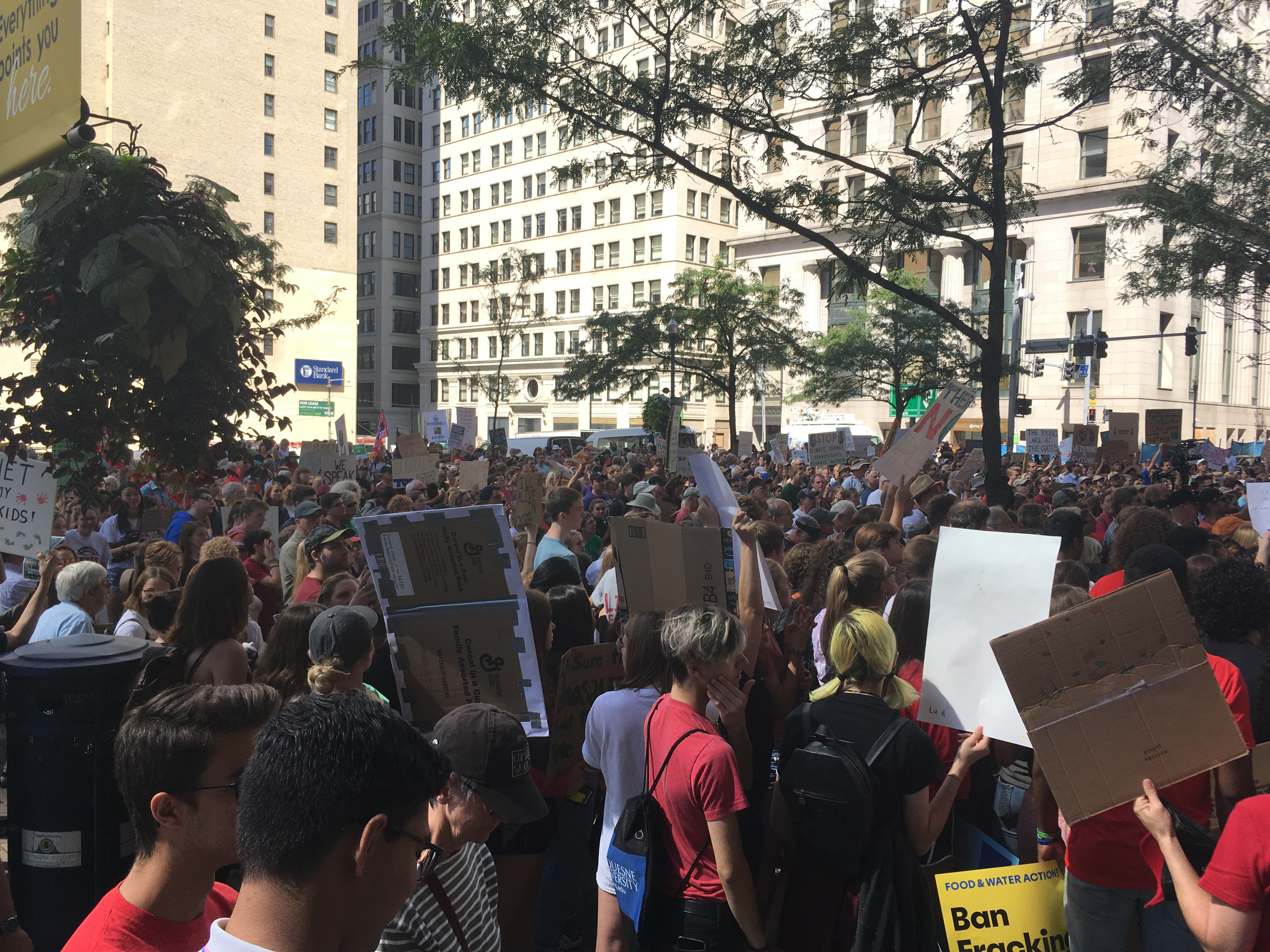
Protest in Pittsburgh, Pennsylvania

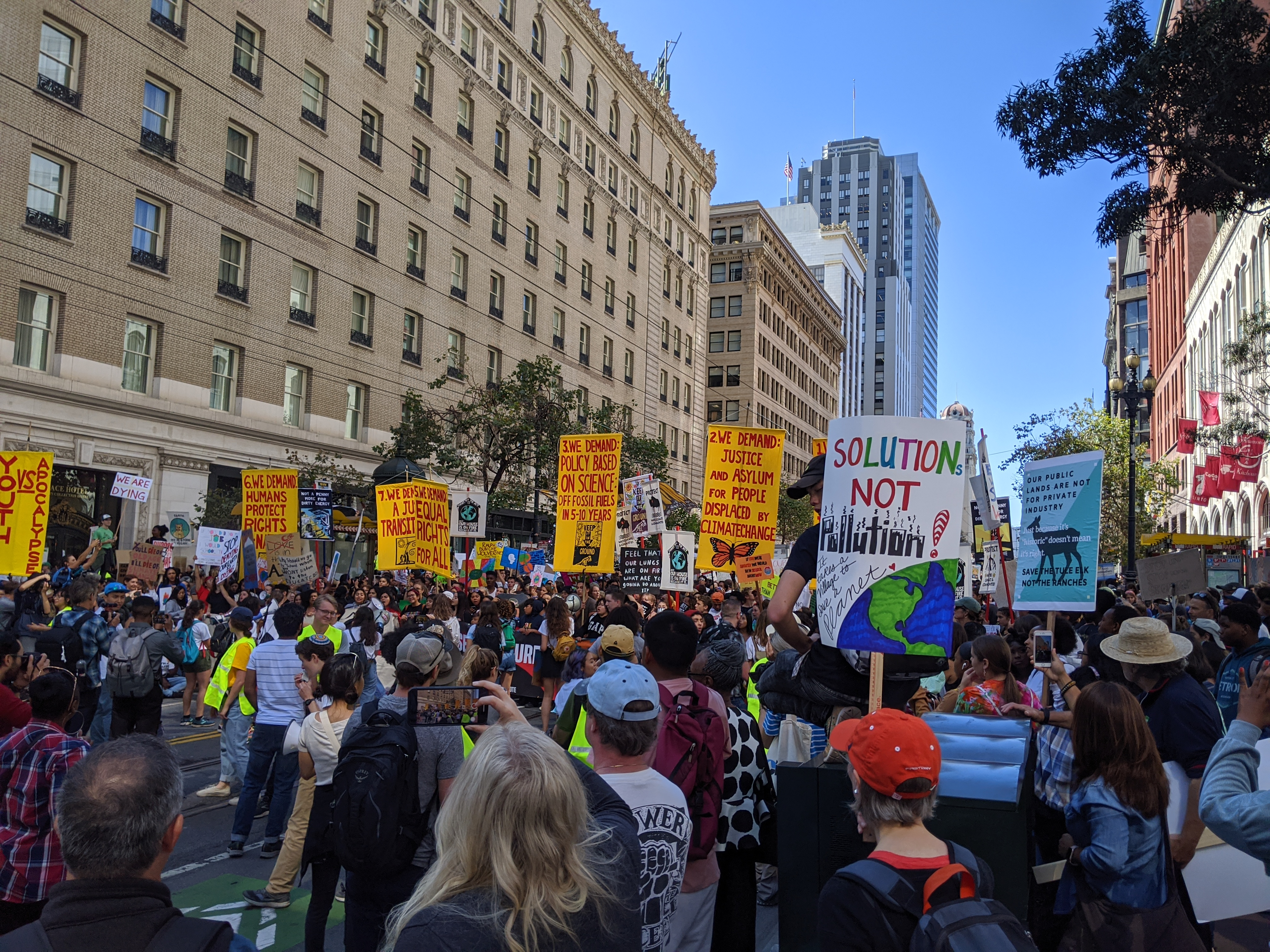
Protest in San Francisco, California

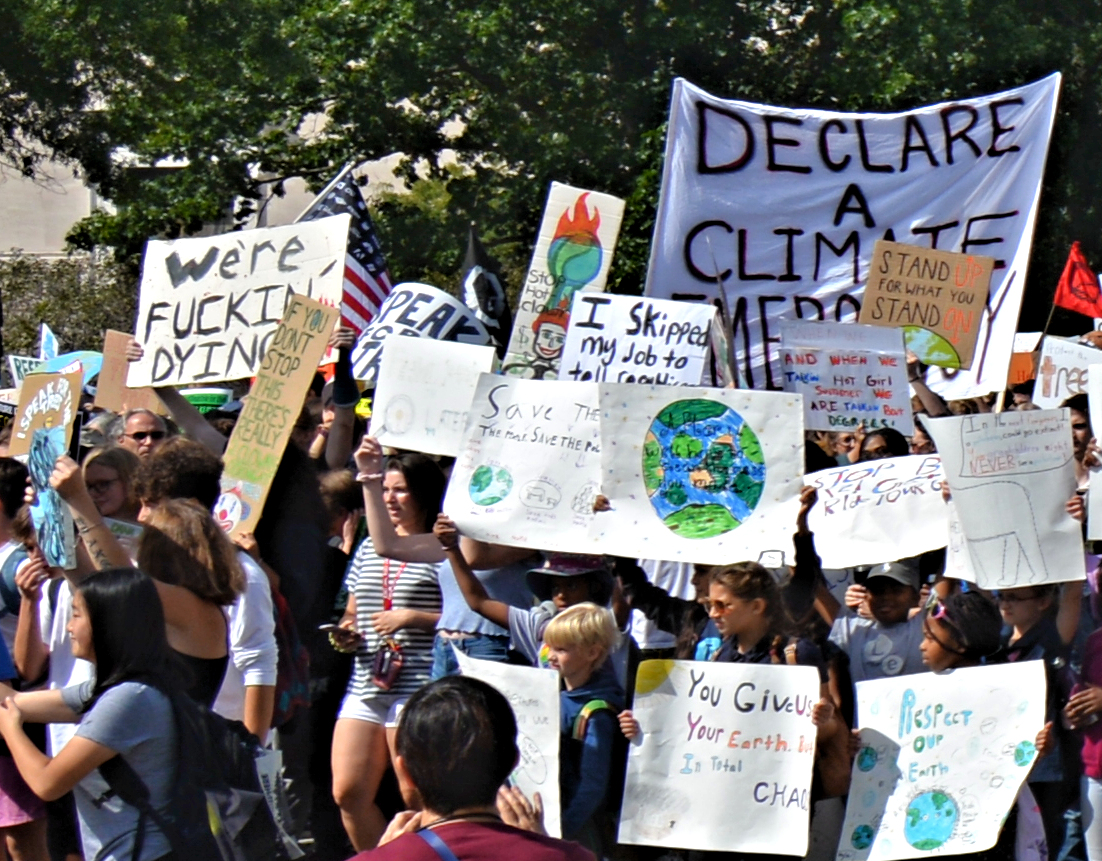
Protest in Washington, D.C.

=== Uruguay ===
Protests were held in Uruguay's capital city of Montevideo, Tacuarembó, Maldonado, Treinta y Tres, Trinidad and Rivera. Through its social networks movement, #ViernesPorElFuturoUy (#FridaysforFutureUy) ordered the public to act and spread the message on the awareness. In the message "We march and demand that Uruguay declare the state of climatic and ecological emergency. The earth is dying, and with it our future. In 11 years there will be no more time to think how to save it and make it habitable again, because we will enter a point of no return. Today we can still do something, so there is to go outside and demand that our authorities took action on the rapid climate change".

=== Vanuatu ===
During the strike on 20 September, the deputy minister of Vanuatu, a low-laying island state in the South Pacific, explicitly mentioned the United States, Canada, Australia, Japan and New Zealand as the countries who are "to blame for this threat to our survival". Meanwhile, hundreds of citizens, many of them being children dressed in traditional clothes, took to the streets of Vanuatu's capital city Port Vila with banners and signs.

=== Vietnam ===
In line with the global protest, around 1,400 volunteers in the capital, Hanoi, collected trash from across city despite the hot weather. Environmental activists also organised a climate protest in Ho Chi Minh City.

== See also ==
- 2019 in politics and government
- Business action on climate change
- World Cleanup Day (21 September 2019)
- List of climate change initiatives
- List of international environmental agreements
- List of school climate strikes
- Paris Agreement
- Politics of global warming
- 15 February 2003 anti-war protests
