= Vossem =

Vossem may refer to:

- Vossem, Belgium, a village in Belgium
- Vossem, Germany, a village in Germany
