= Ringen (Verbandsgemeinde) =

Former municipality in Arnweiler District in Rhineland-Palatinate, Germany

- Verbandsgemeinde
- Coat of arms
- Interactive map of Ringen
- Location within Germany Location within Rhineland-Palatinate
- Coordinates: 50°34′N 7°6′E
- Country: Germany
- State: Rhineland-Palatinate
- District: Landkreis Ahrweiler
- Disbanded: 1974
- Subdivisions: 12 Gemeinden

Area
  - Total: 61.88 km^{2} (23.89 sq mi)

Population (1974)
  - Total: 6,566
  - Density: 106.1/km^{2} (274.8/sq mi)
- Time zone: UTC+01:00 (CET)
  - Summer (DST): UTC+02:00 (CEST)
- Vehicle registration: AW

Ringen is a former Verbandsgemeinde ("collective municipality") in the district of Ahrweiler, in Rhineland-Palatinate, Germany. The seat of the municipality was in Ringen. It existed from 1 October 1968 until 16 March 1974, when the new municipality Grafschaft was formed.

The Verbandsgemeinde Ringen consisted of the following 12 Ortsgemeinden ("local municipalities") (population as of 1974):

Municipality	Area (km²)	Population
Bengen		413
Birresdorf		369
Eckendorf		287
Gelsdorf		823
Holzweiler		623
Kalenborn		453
Karweiler		457
Lantershofen		690
Leimersdorf		603
Nierendorf		418
Ringen *		948
Vettelhoven		482
Verbandsgemeinde Ringen	61.88	6,566

^{*} seat of the Verbandsgemeinde
