= Lützerath =

Village in North Rhine-Westphalia, Germany

- Hamlet of Erkelenz
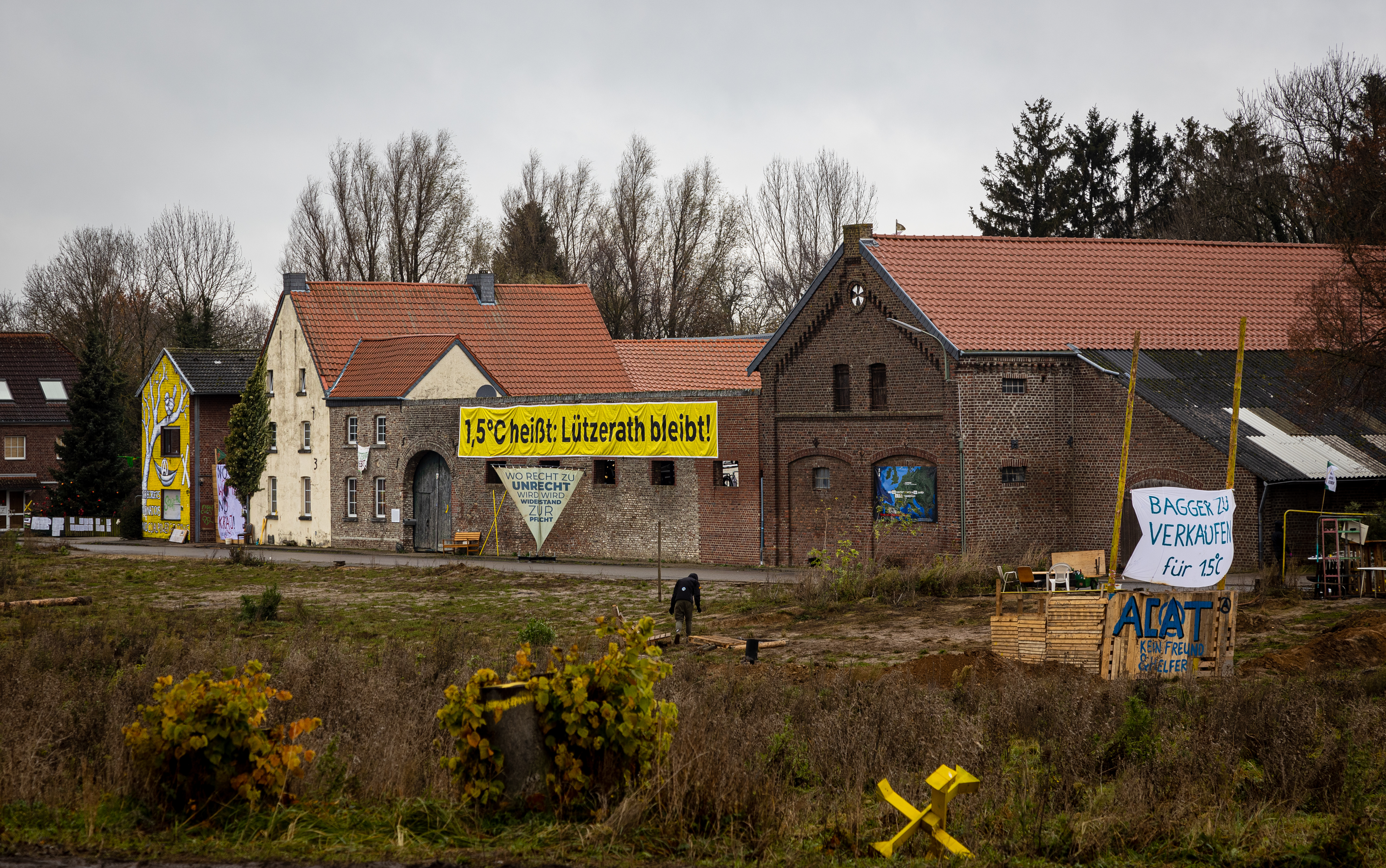
- Lützerath in 2021, a squatted farm with a banner
- Interactive map of Lützerath
- Location within Germany Location within North Rhine-Westphalia
- Coordinates: 51°3′32″N 6°25′37″E
- Country: Germany
- State: North Rhine-Westphalia
- Town: Erkelenz

Population (31 March 2023)
  - Total: 1
- Time zone: UTC+01:00 (CET)
  - Summer (DST): UTC+02:00 (CEST)

Lützerath (German pronunciation: [ˈlʏtsəʁaːt]) was a hamlet in the German state of North Rhine-Westphalia, between Aachen and Düsseldorf. In 2013, the Federal Constitutional Court ruled in favour of the expansion of the Garzweiler surface mine; in January 2023, Lützerath was eradicated to make way for the opencast mining of Garzweiler II; it will eventually be replaced with a lake. A farmer contested the plans which were approved by the higher administrative court in Münster. Climate activists moved to the village, squatting on empty farms and occupying treehouses. In an attempt to save the village, a campaign called "Lützerath lebt" (Lützerath lives) was started. In October 2022, the federal government and the state of North Rhine-Westphalia announced that RWE would phase out coal mining in the region by 2030, but Lützerath would still be demolished. The eviction occurred in January 2023.

== History ==
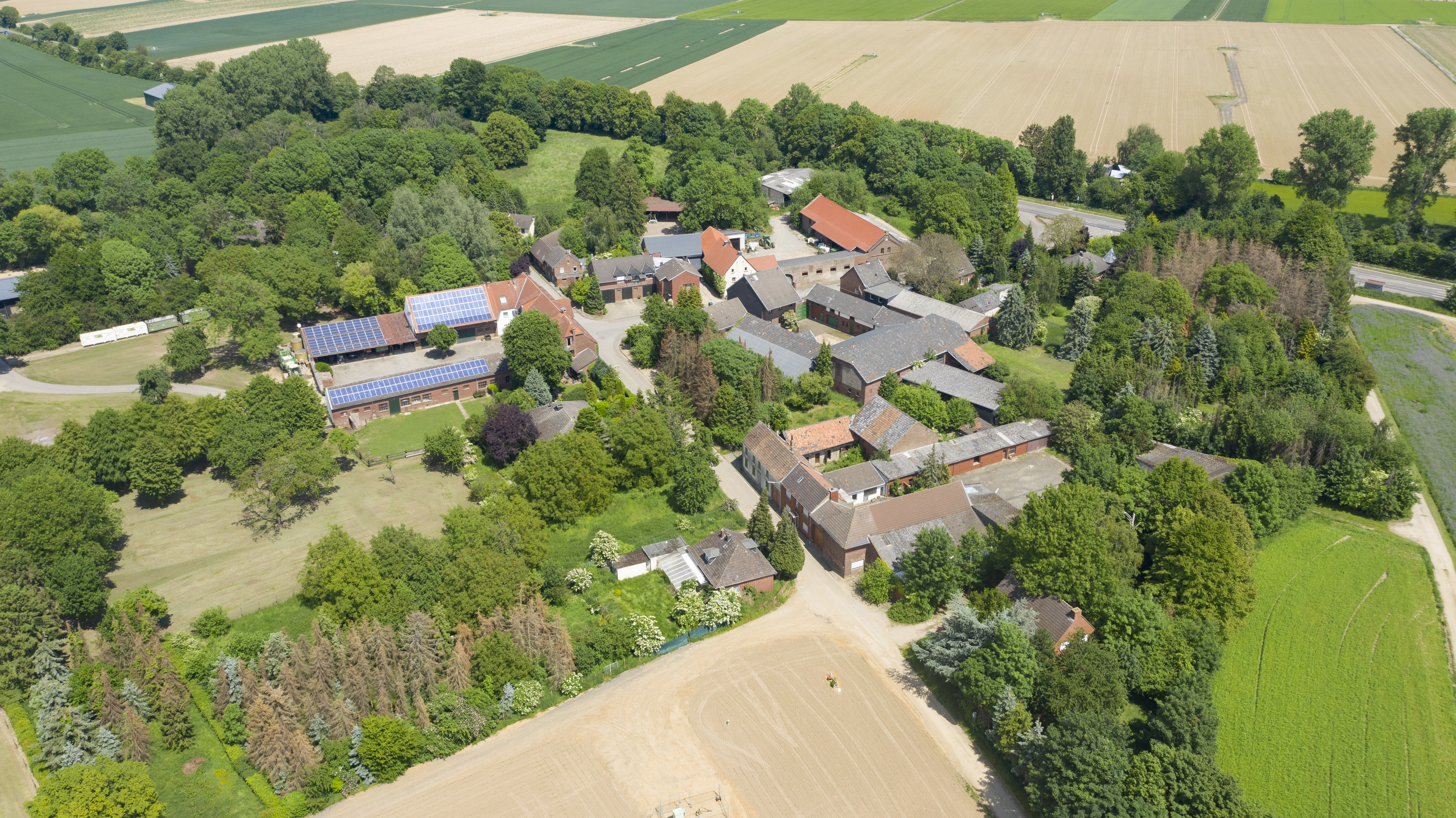
Lützerath in 2019

The hamlet of Lützerath was first mentioned as Lutzelenrode in 1168. The area had several farms, including the Duissener Hof or Wachtmeisterhof, which was run by the Cistercian monastery in Duisburg from 1265 until 1802. Eckhardt Heukamp became the owner of the last remaining farm.

== Mining ==
In 2013, the Federal Constitutional Court ruled in favour of the expansion of the Garzweiler surface mine in the German state of North Rhine-Westphalia, between Aachen and Düsseldorf. There are thought to be 1.3 billion tons of lignite (also known as brown coal) in the Garzweiler II area. Energy company RWE planned to remove more than 600 million tons of it by opencast mining, which would necessitate the permanent destruction of several villages.

The decision to extend the mining of lignite was controversial and resulted in the displacement of hundreds of people. In 2018, 900 villagers were resettled and several buildings including a church were destroyed. In Erkelenz, multiple wind turbines were demolished.

By 2021, the hamlet of Lützerath became the centrepoint of the protests against the Garzweiler mine. People had been resettled from the village since 2005; then, farmer Eckart Heukamp refused to leave his land. The state government and RWE had planned to demolish Lützerath by the end of 2022, but Heukamp lodged a legal complaint. The court in Aachen found in favour of RWE, so Heukamp went to the higher administrative court in Münster (Oberverwaltungsgericht für das Land NRW) and RWE promised to wait for the decision of the court. After the protests at Hambach Forest, which became known as "Hambi", activists moved to Lützerath, which was nicknamed "Lützi".

On 28 March 2022, the court ruled that RWE could proceed with the mining and was entitled to demolish the village, so Heukamp left his farm.

The Garzweiler mine is eventually planned to be made into a lake.

== Occupation ==
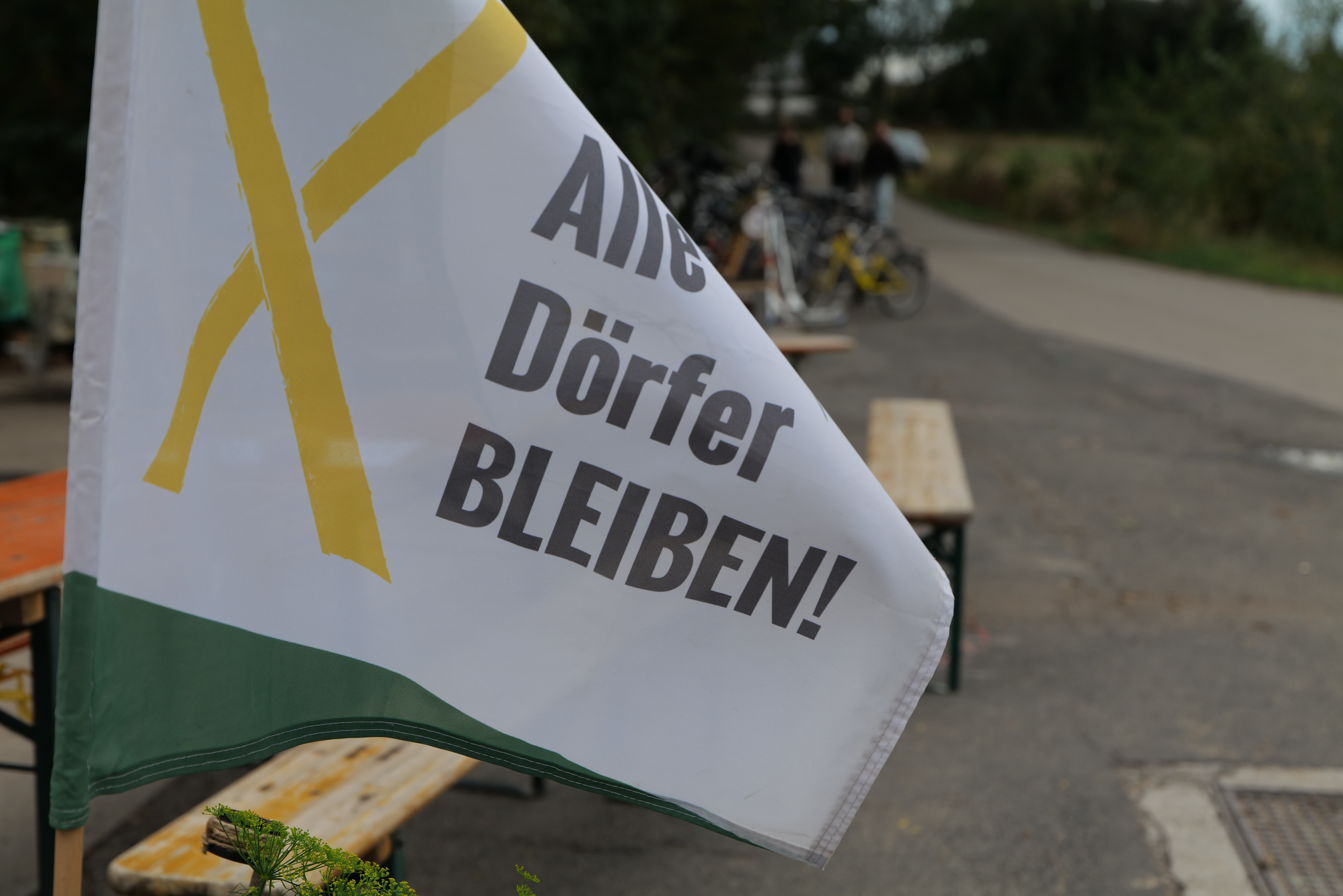
"Alle Dörfer BLEIBEN!" (All villages remain!)

From 2020 onwards, climate activists began to move to Lützerath, first as tenants and then as squatters, as the land was cleared by RWE. By the end of 2022, there were around 80 people living in squatted farms, tents and treehouses, although the population fluctuated heavily by season. To save the village, a campaign called "Lützerath lebt" (Lützerath lives) began. A climate activist won 50,000 euros on a television show and pledged to spend the money buying up land in the village.

In April 2022, 3500 people demonstrated against the mine.

In October 2022, the federal government and the state of North Rhine-Westphalia announced that RWE would phase out coal mining in the region by 2030. Lützerath would still be demolished, but five other villages would be spared, namely Berverath, Keyenberg, Kuckum, Oberwestrich and Unterwestrich. The RWE AG agreed to mine around 280 million tonnes less lignite than previously planned.

The protests became larger, with another camp setting up in Keyenberg. Ende Gelände supported the protests. Following the French tactic of Zone to Defend, the occupiers declared Lützerath to be ZAD Rhineland and organised a festival under the slogan "Alle Dörfer BLEIBEN!" (All villages remain!) in November 2021.

== Eviction ==
The Heinsberg county administration issued an order permitting evictions from Lützerath from 10 January 2023 onwards and banned people from going there. Initially, activists confronted the police and drove them back. ZDF estimated there were 2,000 protestors planning to resist the eviction and aiming to prevent the police from accessing the site. Franciscan friar Loïc Schneider drew attention online for impeding police officers, leading to descriptions of him as a "mud wizard" for the traditional friar's habit he wore. Schneider would eventually be sentenced to a 4,200 Euro fine.

Climate activist Luisa Neubauer and the head of the Earth System Analysis at the Potsdam Institute for Climate Impact Research both condemned the eviction. On 17 January 2023, climate activist Greta Thunberg was arrested by German police while participating in a protest against demolishing Lützerath for the Garzweiler surface mine expansion. The eviction of the village was mostly carried out by 21 January 2023.

== See also ==
- Bund für Umwelt und Naturschutz Deutschland (BUND)
- Church of St. Lambertus, Immerath
- Ende Gelände 2021, Ende Gelände 2022, Ende Gelände 2023
- Immerath (old)
