= Leo Heinrichs =

German-American priest

Servant of God Leo Heinrichs OFM
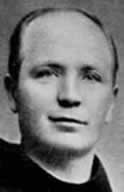
- Born: Joseph Heinrichs; August 15, 1867; Oestrich, Rhineland, Kingdom of Prussia (present day Germany)
- Died: February 23, 1908 (aged 40); Denver, Colorado, United States

Leo Heinrichs, OFM (August 15, 1867 – February 23, 1908) (birth name Joseph Heinrichs) was a German-born religious priest of the Franciscan Order.

While assigned to St. Elizabeth of Hungary Church in Denver, Colorado, Heinrichs was fatally shot during a mass while distributing communion. The shooter was a Sicilian anarchist who was later executed for his crime. Heinrichs was later declared a Servant of God, the first step on the path to sainthood.

== Biography ==
=== Early life ===
Joseph Heinrichs was born on August 15, 1867, in Oestrich in the Rhineland state in the Kingdom of Prussia (present day Germany).Having decided to become a priest, Heinrichs as a teenager entered the Franciscan minor seminary near Fulda in the newly-formed German Empire in the early 1870s.

Otto von Bismarck, the German chancellor, started enacting restrictive laws on Catholic religious orders in the second half of the 19th century. In 1876, the Franciscans were compelled to relocate to the United States to escape the German laws. Still studying in the minor seminary, Heinrichs left with the Franciscans.

The Franciscans moved into an abandoned Carmelite convent in Paterson, New Jersey, where they established the St. Bonaventure Friary. On December 4, 1886, Heinrichs entered the Franciscan novitiate at St. Bonaventure and received the monastic name Brother Leo. He took his final vows as a Franciscan on December 8, 1890; he was ordained to the priesthood on July 26, 1891.

=== Priesthood ===
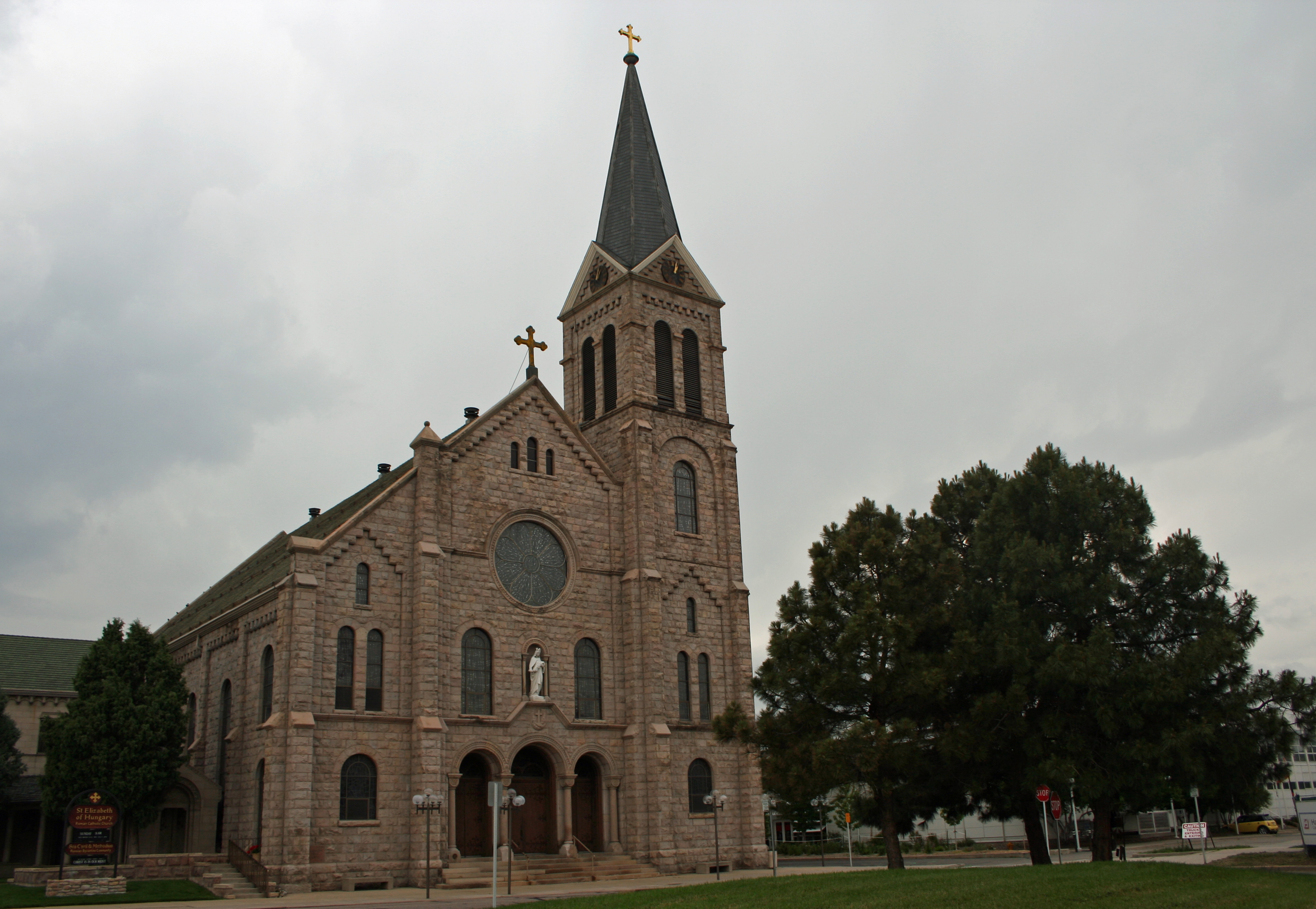
St. Elizabeth of Hungary Church, Denver (2009)

After his ordination in 1891, the Franciscans assigned Heinrichs as the assistant novice manager at the friary. He was also appointed as an assistant pastor at St. Bonaventure Parish in Paterson. The Franciscans later moved Heinrichs to Little Falls, New Jersey, to serve as assistant pastor of Our Lady of the Holy Angels Parish. In April 1902, a fire devastated most of the town of Croghan in Northern New York, including St. Stephen's Church. The Franciscans sent him to Croghan to rebuild the church, which was dedicated in November 1903. To pay down the parish debt, Heinrich solicited donations from workers in the lumber camps of Lewis County. In a letter dated January 27, 1904, he describes his travels:

I was away to the woods in order to collect among the lumbermen. I was away four days each time, and two nights I had to sleep with the men in the camps. The poor fellows have to work so hard early and late and have so little comfort. We drove 100 miles the first trip with the thermometer at zero. The second trip 20 miles one day at 40 degrees below. But covered from head to foot in fur, you don’t seem to mind the cold. You have no idea how nice it is to travel through the woods on a clear day when the wind does not disturb the snow. The winter here is the severest that people remember. We had, more or less since the beginning of December, zero to 40 below, and the snowstorms nearly every other day make the roads almost impassable.

The Franciscans in early 1907 brought Henrichs back to St. Bonaventure Parish to serve as its pastor. While at St. Bonaventure, a smallpox outbreak occurred in Paterson. Heinrichs spent many hours tending the sick and dying there.

Due to Heinrichs' frail health, in September 1907, the Franciscans transferred Heinrichs to St. Elizabeth, a national parish for German immigrants in Denver, Colorado. As a pastor, Heinrichs would distribute food to the poor every morning at the friary gate. The Franciscans gave Heinrichs permission to visit his family in Germany in early 1908. However, he decided to wait until after June, as he was planning to give first communion to a class of 70 children at St Elizabeth. In early February 2008, a week before his death, Heinrichs preached at the Young Ladies' Sodality meeting. During his talk, Heinrichs said, “How sweet it is to die at the feet of Mary.”

=== Death ===
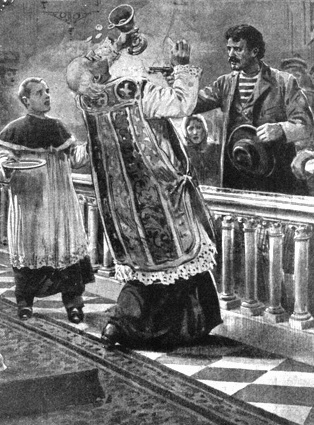
The Heinrichs murder (1908)

On Sunday, February 23, 1908, Heinrichs was celebrating the 6:00 am "Workingmen's Mass" at St. Elizabeth's. Sitting in the church was 50-year-old Giuseppe Alia, an unemployed shoemaker from Avola, Sicily. After taking communion from Heinrichs in his mouth at the altar rail, Alia spit the host into his hand and flung it at the priest. Alia then drew a revolver. The altar boy tried to warn the priest, but Alia shot Heinrichs at point blank range in the chest. Heinrichs attempted to retrieve the fallen host before collapsing on the step of the Altar of Our Lady. Heinrichs died in the church a few minutes later at age 41.

== Aftermath of shooting ==
After shooting Heinrichs, Alia attempted to flee St. Elizabeth's. However, he was subdued and arrested by an off-duty Denver police officer in the congregation. Speaking through an interpreter at the police station, Alia declared himself an anarchist and said he wanted to kill as many priests as he could.

Alia pleaded not guilty at his trial. Doctor Joseph Cuneo, the former Italian consul in Denver, and consul Baron Gustavo Tosti, also a physician, testified that he was insane. The prosecution experts said he was sane. Alia was convicted of first degree murder and sentenced to death. Alia never expressed any remorse for killing Henrichs.The Franciscan Order unsuccessfully pleaded with the governor of Colorado to commute his sentence to life imprisonment.

In the wake of the Heinrichs murder and the attempted assassination of Chicago Police Chief George M. Shippy, police departments across the nation started arresting anarchists. US Secretary of Commerce and Labor Oscar Straus in March 2008 ordered immigration inspectors to work closely with local police and the United States Secret Service to find, arrest and deport immigrants with anarchist beliefs under the terms of the 1903 Anarchist Exclusion Act. Alia was hanged on July 15, 1908, at the Colorado State Penitentiary in Cañon City.

== Legacy ==
When the Denver coroner examined Heinrichs' body, he discovered that the priest had wrapped his waist with leather straps studded with iron hooks, a means of mortification of the flesh.A requiem mass for Heinrichs was celebrated in Denver; thousands of people attended, including Colorado Governor Henry Augustus Buchtel. Heinrichs' body was transported by rail to St. Bonaventure Monastery in Paterson. Over 20,000 people came to view his body at the monastery. Edward Blecke, provincial of the Franciscan Province of the Holy Name, celebrated a second funeral mass for Heinrichs there. Heinrichs was buried at the Holy Sepulchre Cemetery in Totowa, New Jersey.

The following namesakes were named after Heinrichs:

- The Father Leo Memorial School, opened in Croghan in 1916
- Leo-Heinrichs-Weg (Leo-Heinrichs Way) in Erkelenz, Germany

== Veneration ==
Heinrichs's cause for beatification was opened in 1938, and his grave continues to be visited by pilgrims.
