= Michael Bauer (artist) =

German artist

- Born: 1973 (age 52–53); Erkelenz, West Germany
- Known for: Painting

Michael Bauer (born 1973) is an artist based in Cologne.

Bauer was born in Erkelenz, Germany. He has shown his paintings in many group exhibitions including "Das Kabinet" at Galerie Hammelehle und Ahrens, Cologne, "Superschloss" at Stadtische Galerie, Wolfsburg and "Brotherslasher" (with Jonathan Meese). He represented by Marc Foxx in Los Angeles and Hotel in London. His work has been seen in eight solo exhibitions and in group exhibitions in Europe and America since 1999.

== See also ==
- List of German painters
