= Ende Gelände =

Climate justice movement in Germany

Logo

Ende Gelände (EG) (German saying for "here and no further"; literally "end terrain" or "end of terrain") is a civil disobedience movement occupying coal mines in Germany to raise awareness for climate justice. Ende Gelände has been organizing mass civil disobedience actions against coal mines in Rhineland, Lusatia and Leipzig since 2015. Since 2017, it has participated in civil disobedience protests against coal mining and fracking in Poland, the Netherlands and the Czech Republic. It supports Venice's movement against big cruising ships. Annual protests in Germany have been attended by between 3000 and 7000 participants. It regularly supports anti-racist rallies in Germany and has hosted a range of smaller local protests since 2018.

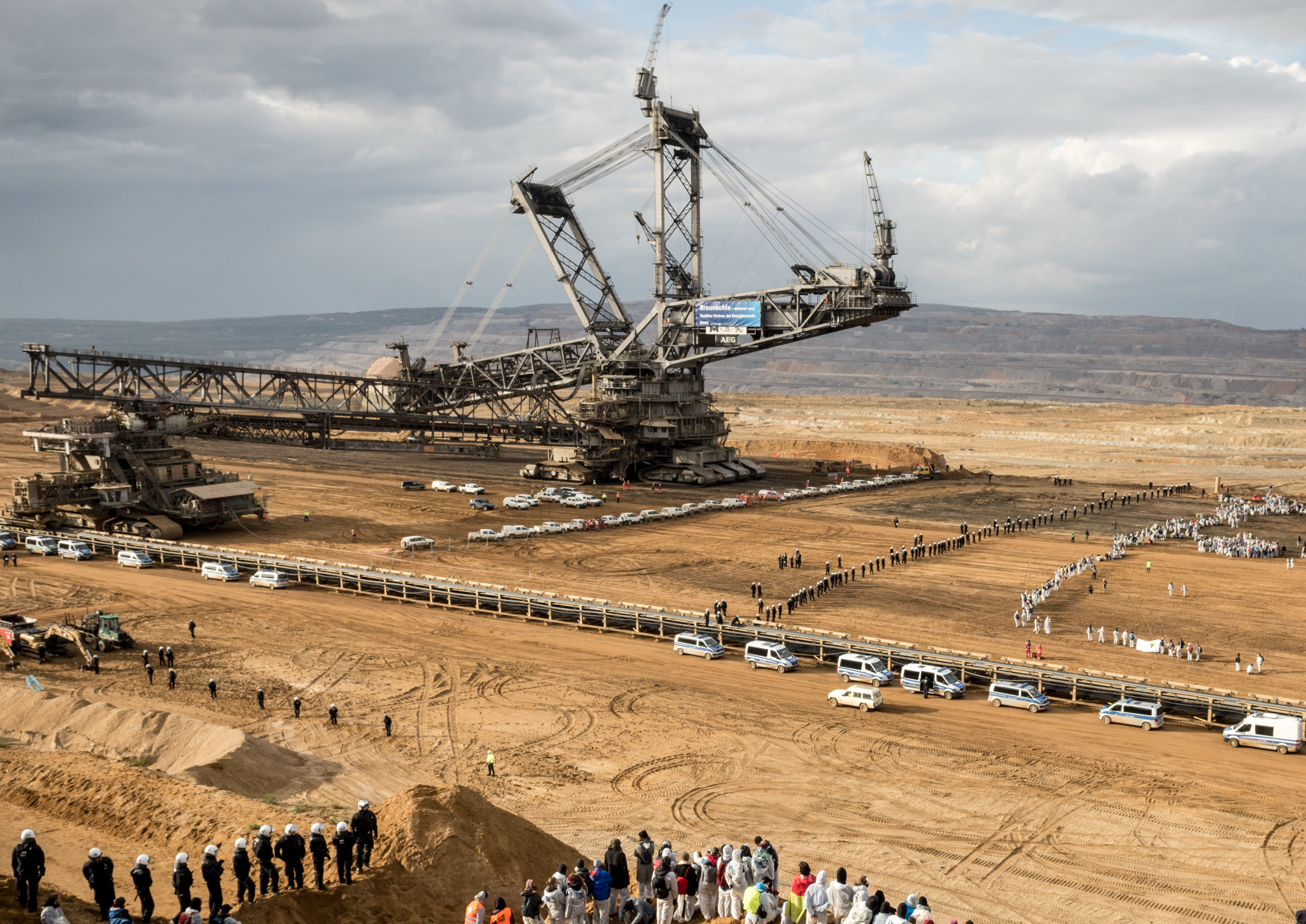
Ende Gelände 2017 police line and line of activists, in the background a stopped coal bucket-wheel excavator of RWE

== Organization ==
Ende Gelände was founded by a broad alliance of anti-coal groups, grassroots climate action groups, large environmental organizations, left-wing groups and others. Big organizations like Fridays For Future, Greenpeace and Bund für Umwelt und Naturschutz Deutschland have expressed solidarity with the movement. It has evolved from an alliance into a movement in its own right with the emergence of independent local groups since 2017. In 2020, it has 50 local groups in Germany and nine more throughout Europe (Sweden, Netherlands, Denmark, France, Belgium, Switzerland, Italy, Austria, Czech Republic).

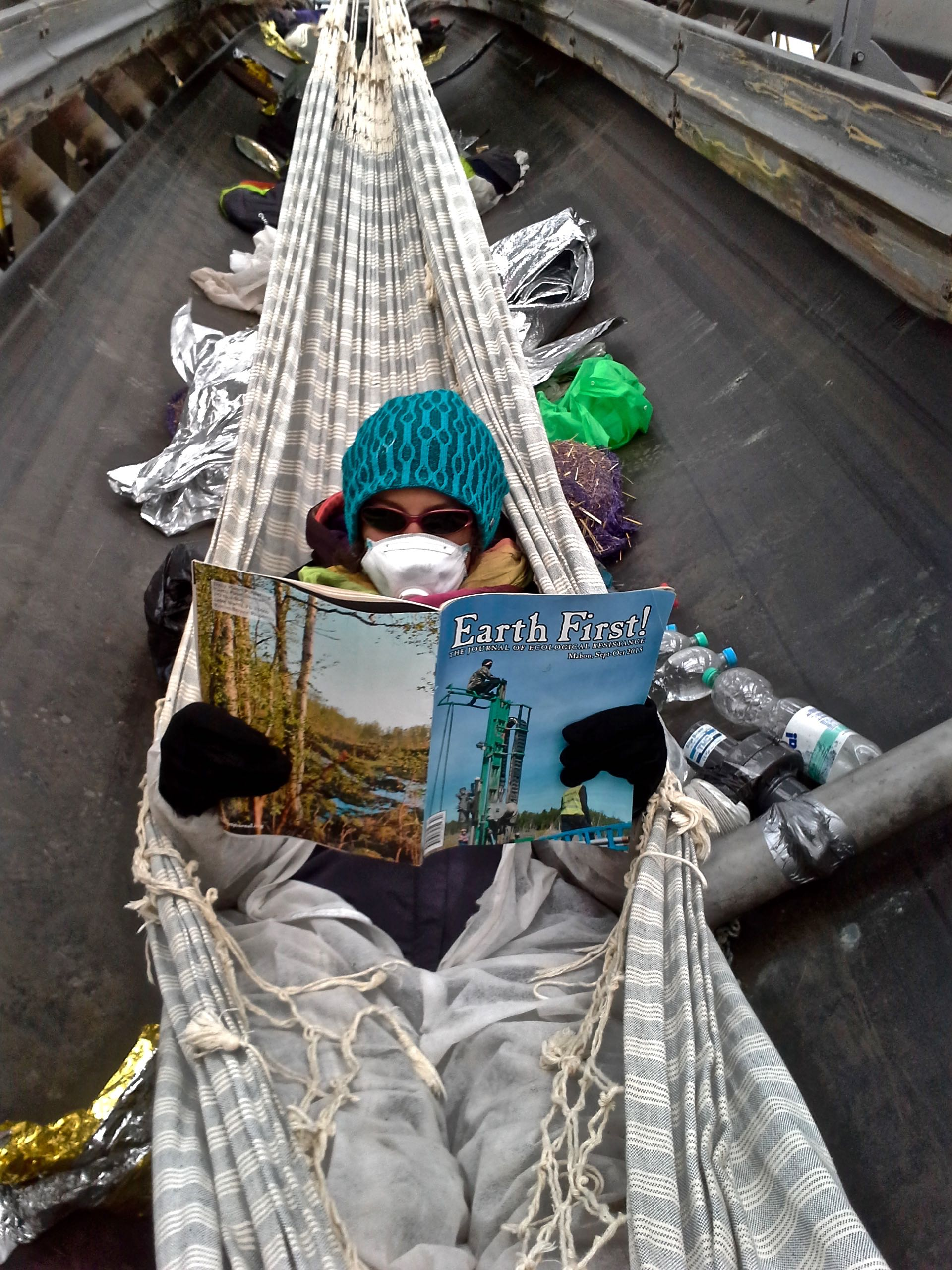
Ende Gelände 2016

The now international movement meets roughly once a month in different cities in Germany. Discussions are usually simultaneously interpreted into English. Newsletters and communication at the climate camps are mostly translated into English or other European languages. It has 19 working groups on topics such as setting up the camp, press relations, finances, legal matters etc.

EG is not part of an NGO and does not receive regular funding. It is supported by a vast network of volunteers, many of them organized in other movements like the legal team that supports all those facing legal consequences of acts of civil disobedience. EG is not legally registered in Germany and therefore cannot be financially supported by most NGOs. Its press speakers mostly use pseudonyms, though some people work with their real names.

EG is one of the largest self-organizing environmental groups. Its decision making and self-organization culture is generally seen as a key factor in its endurance.

== COVID-19 ==
Protests in 2020 were delayed until late September due to the insecure COVID-19 pandemic situation. EG used a system with decoded lists to register participants and allow for backtracking of people, while making sure authorities could not obtain lists with names.

== Methods ==
Ende Gelände has been blocking coal infrastructure once or twice a year with one large event. Its "forms of action are openly announced blockades of fossil infrastructure, such as coal and gas." In the tradition of peaceful civil disobedience, it defies the law of trespassing by walking into coal mines and ignoring calls to cease issued by authorities. In its "action consensus" it says "We will remain calm and level-headed; we will not endanger people. We will block and occupy with our bodies. It is not our aim to destroy or damage infrastructure. We will not be held back by structural obstacles. We will pass through or surround police or plant security barriers. Our action will convey an image of diversity, creativity and openness."

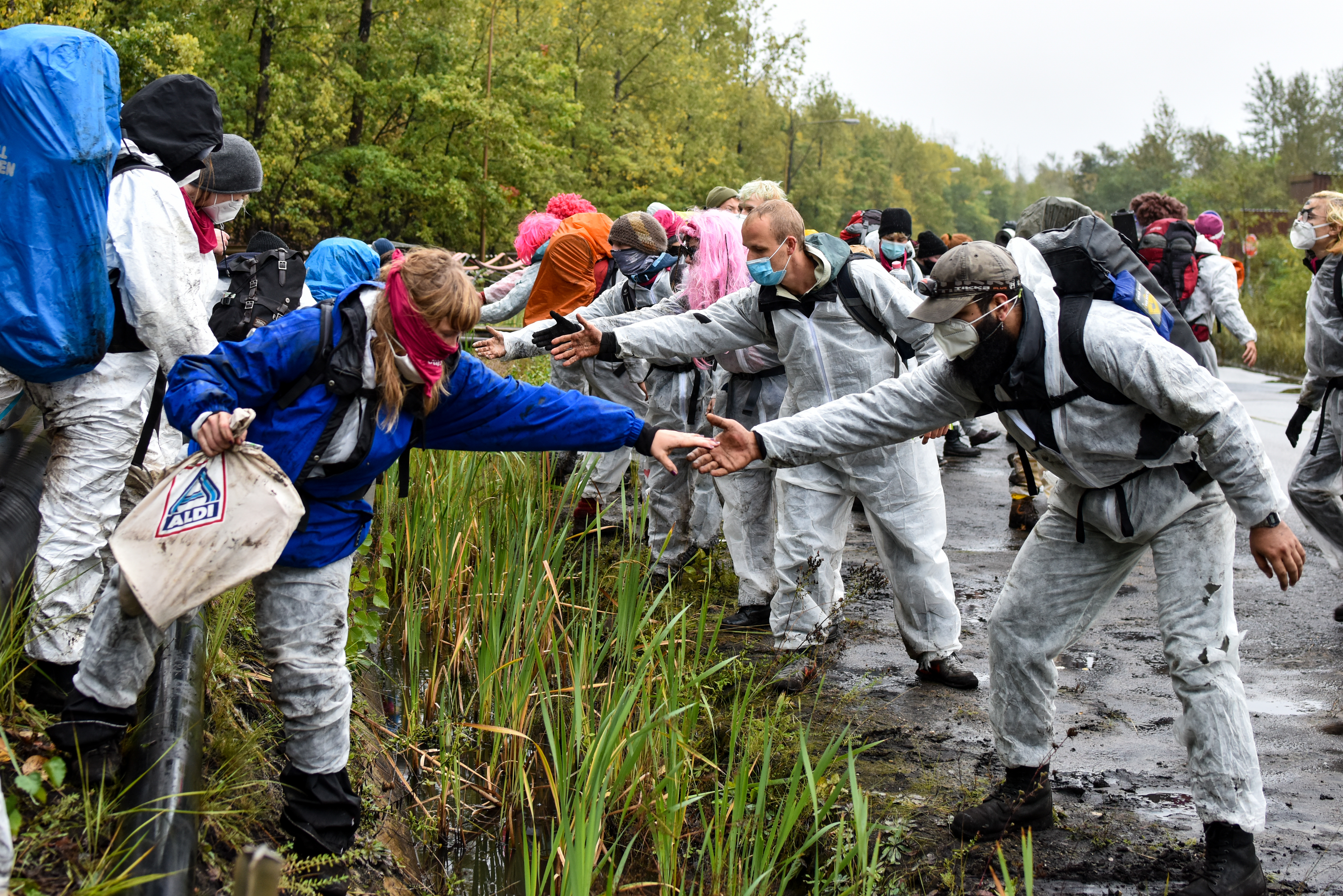
Pink finger climbs over a ditch

EG sees itself in the tradition of civil disobedience in environmental protests like the first climate camps in the United Kingdom or the anti-nuclear movement in Germany.

Peaceful confrontations with police and "flowing through police lines" is mostly practiced in "aktionstraining" with medium and small size groups of 10 to 100 people in cities with local EG branches and in climate camps prior to action.

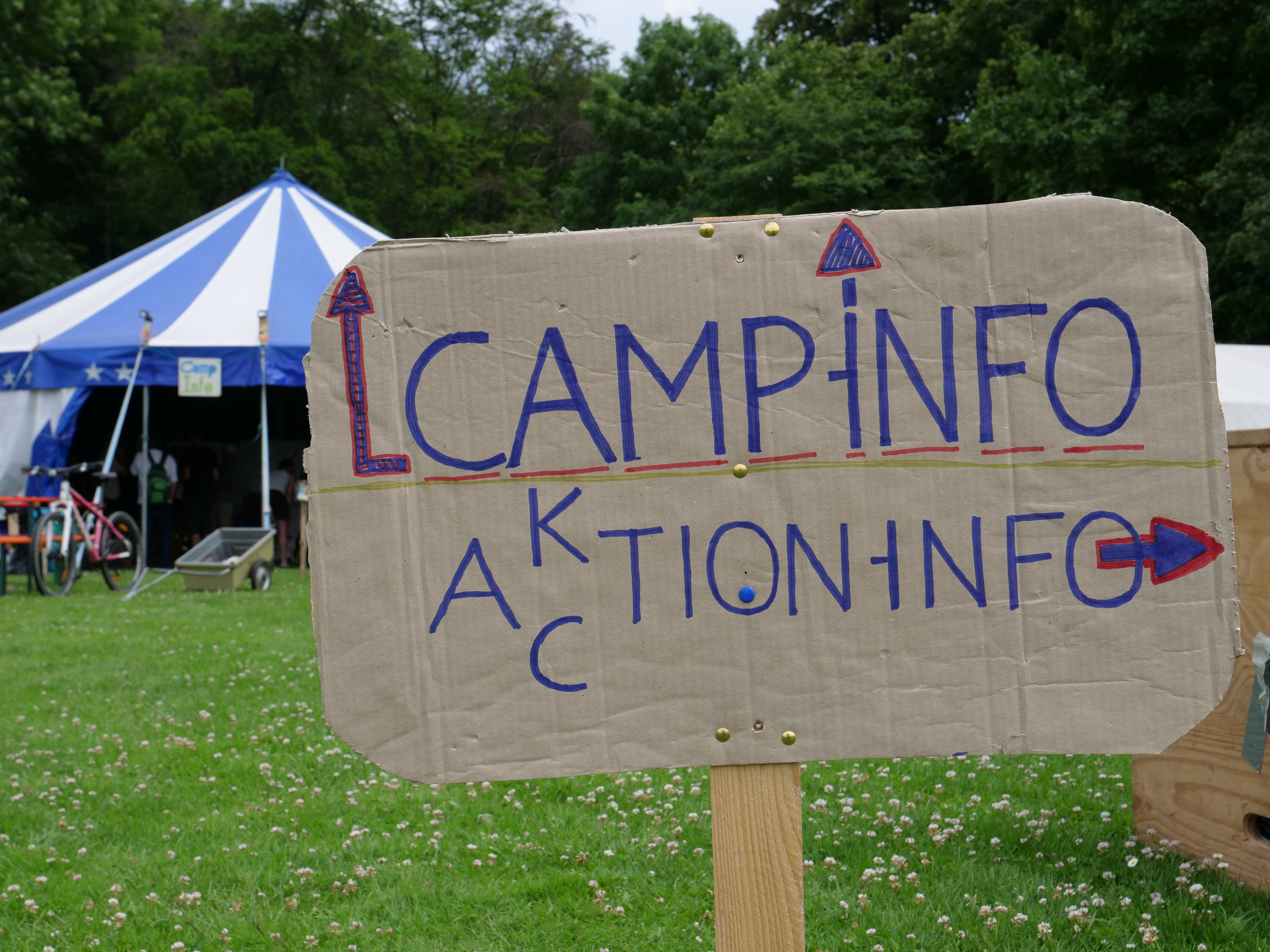
Ende Gelände protest camp, 19 June 2019

== Opposition to far-right party and racism ==
EG has participated in several anti-racist rallies and rallies against meetings of Germany's far-right party Alternative for Germany (AfD) with the slogan "Climate Movement means Antifa".

The far-right AfD regularly decries EG to be extremist and calls for repression by legal means or by the national secret service "Verfassungsschutz". The secret service Verfassungsschutz lists EG since 2016 on its list with organizations it labels "extremist", mostly for the slogan "system change not climate change". In 2020, the local Berlin branch escalated the accusation by claiming that EG would at least accept and tolerate violence against police. It did not deliver proof for the claims, except the participation of a leftist group, interventionistische Linke. As a reaction most environmental NGO, numbering 97 in total, including 350.org, Friends of the Earth Germany, Oxfam and many local groups of Extinction Rebellion signed a letter of solidarity, rejecting the attempted "criminalization" of EG. The resulting scandal led to a call for the dissolution of Berlin's Verfassungsschutz supported by the Green and Left party, both presently forming a government in the city with social democrats, who opposed the move.

Nine policemen were suspended from being deployed during an EG action in December 2019 after posing for a photo against EG, where they associated themselves with the local neo-Nazi scene.

== Police violence ==
The far right and reports from the police regularly publish claims that EG is violent, contrary to its own self-conception, though no incidences of violence have been reported. EG regularly refutes the accusations. EG accused the police in 2017 and 2020 of illegal violence against peaceful protesters. In most of these cases, people were injured with horses, batons, pepper spray, and punches. In 2020 the police also injured activists with dogs. EG did not provide numbers, but reports indicate that dozens out of thousands were mostly lightly injured, while a few were seriously injured.

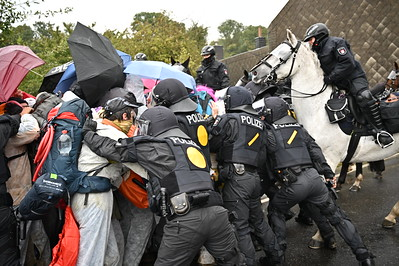
One out of several groups faces police on horses.

EG's positions against police violence were widely picked up in national media and reporting was mostly in favour of EG, though no police were held personally liable until 2020. In 2017 and 2020, journalists were injured by police and RWE private security personnel. Ende Gelände issued a press statement in 2020 that elevated the accusations against the police to the level of a "police problem in Germany" as they systematically breach the constitutional rights of activists.

== Goals and impact ==
Ende Gelände considers itself as part of the global movement for climate justice. It calls for an immediate end to coal power generation and a social and ecological transition that overcomes "fossil capitalism". EG rejects the ongoing demolition of villages for the extension of coal mines. EG supported the occupation of the Hambach Forest close to Cologne that was to be logged for the extension of a coal mine. The forest was finally saved, and EG called it a victory for the climate justice movement.

In 2016, its slogan was "we are the investment risk". Its protest against Vattenfall was described by writer John Jordan as "direct action at its best"; the German parliament reopened discussion into the proposed sale and the company eventually sold at -1.7 billion (due to environmental liabilities) instead of the expected 2 to 3 billion.

== Smaller and local events ==
EG has participated in or organized various smaller events, like adbusting against the greenwashing of Germany's national railway company, or against Chancellor Merkel's climate politics.

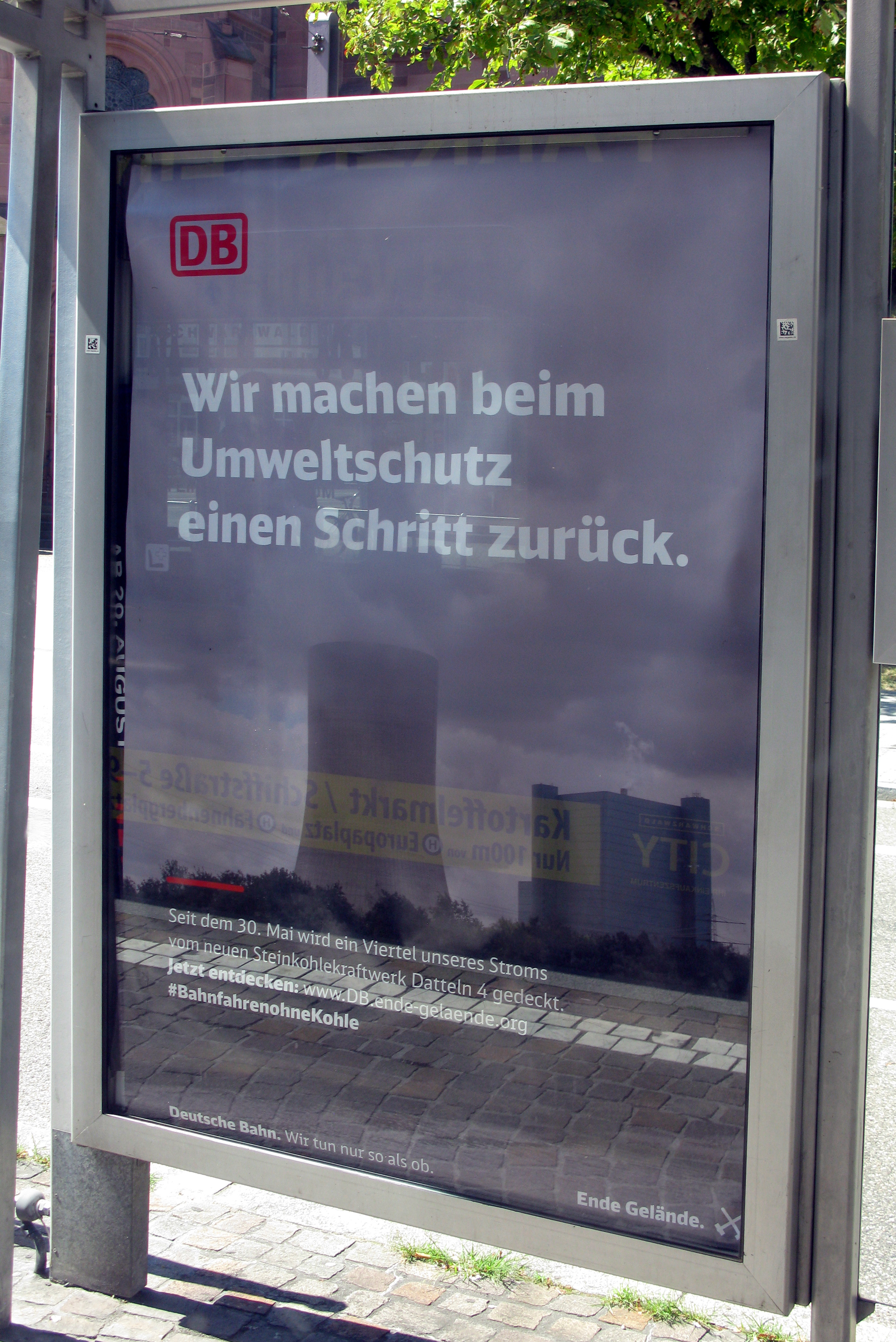
Adbusting against Germany's railway company Deutsche Bahn in Freiburg, 2020

Local groups protested with demonstrations and acts of civil disobedience against the new power plant Datteln 4 that burns imported hard coal from Russia and Colombia, and against the government's "coal commission" that issued a plan in 2020 to end coal power generation by 2038 - much later than demanded by environmental movement organizations and NGOs.

== Workers and trade unions ==
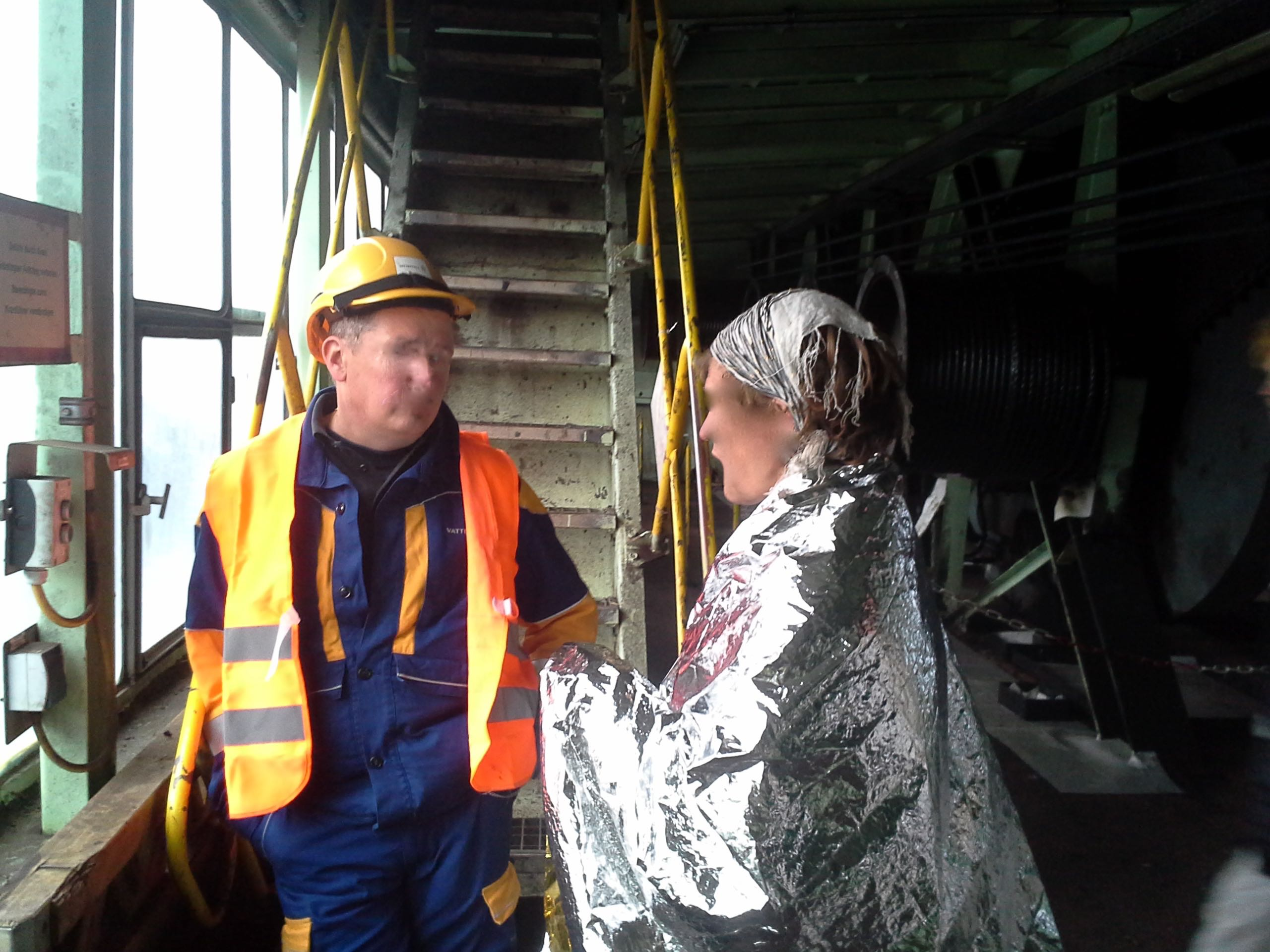
Coal miner and activist on a machine, talking, during Ende Gelände 2016

EG has held several mid level talks with trade union representatives. Among its demands is a transition strategy for coal dependent regions and an exit strategy without layoffs. Germany's remaining 30000 coal workers are highly unionized. IGBCE union mostly rejects demands for a transition and has been sceptical about the Paris climate agreement and climate politics. The second largest trade union Ver.di has been supporting a fast coal exit plan since 2016.

== Europeanization ==
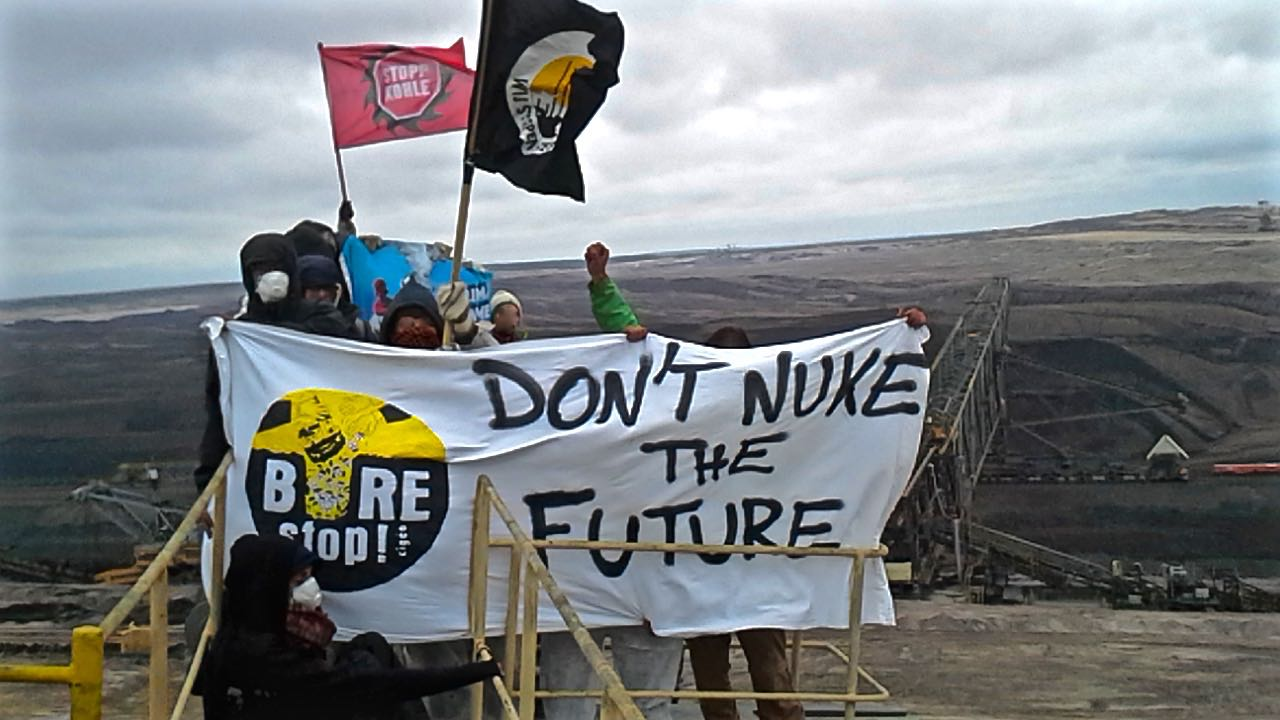
Ende Gelände 2016

Ende Gelände announced the EGGE strategy (Ende Gelaende goes Europe) in 2018 and became increasingly more international. So far, branches in eight EU countries exist, that have sent activists to Germany for mass blockades of EG. From Germany activists have been to Venice in the "no grande navi" anti-cruising ship protests in 2019 and 2020, to Czech Republic in the anti-coal "Limity jsme my" protests since 2017, to anti-coal camps and protests in Poland in 2019 and 2020, as well as in the Code Root anti-fracking protest in the Netherlands in 2018 and 2019. Except for the climate camps in France in 2019 and 2020 all climate camps and protest actions have tried to offer simultaneous translation by volunteers, mostly to English.

== Actions 2015–2023 ==
More detailed information about actions can be found here:

- Ende Gelände 2015, occupation of the Garzweiler open-pit lignite mine, Germany
- Ende Gelände 2016, occupation of open-pit lignite mines in the Lusatia region, Germany
- Ende Gelände 2017, occupation of open-pit lignite mines in the Rhineland coalfields, Germany
- Ende Gelände 2018, occupation of the Hambach open-pit lignite mine, Germany
- Ende Gelände 2019, occupations around the Garzweiler and Lusatian open pit mines, Germany
- Ende Gelände 2020, occupation of Garzweiler open pit mine and also a gas pipeline construction site, Germany, occupation of Danneröder forest to prevent its destruction for a motorway.
- Ende Gelände 2021
- Ende Gelände 2022
- Ende Gelände 2023, see Lützerath

== See also ==
- Camp for Climate Action
- Code Rood
- Direct action
- Earth Strike
- List of environmental protests
- Naturschutzbund Deutschland
- Blockade Australia

== Videos ==
- 2015, from 350.org in English
- 2017, call for participation during international climate summit in Bonn, in English
- 2017, English subtitles, 2 min.
- 2018, English, 2:30 min.
- 2019, hundreds flowing through police lines in coal mine, drone video, English
- Everything's coming together while everything's falling apart: Ende Gelände (2016), a film by Oliver Ressler, 12 min.
