= Vossem, Germany =

Coordinates: 51°06′N 6°13′E

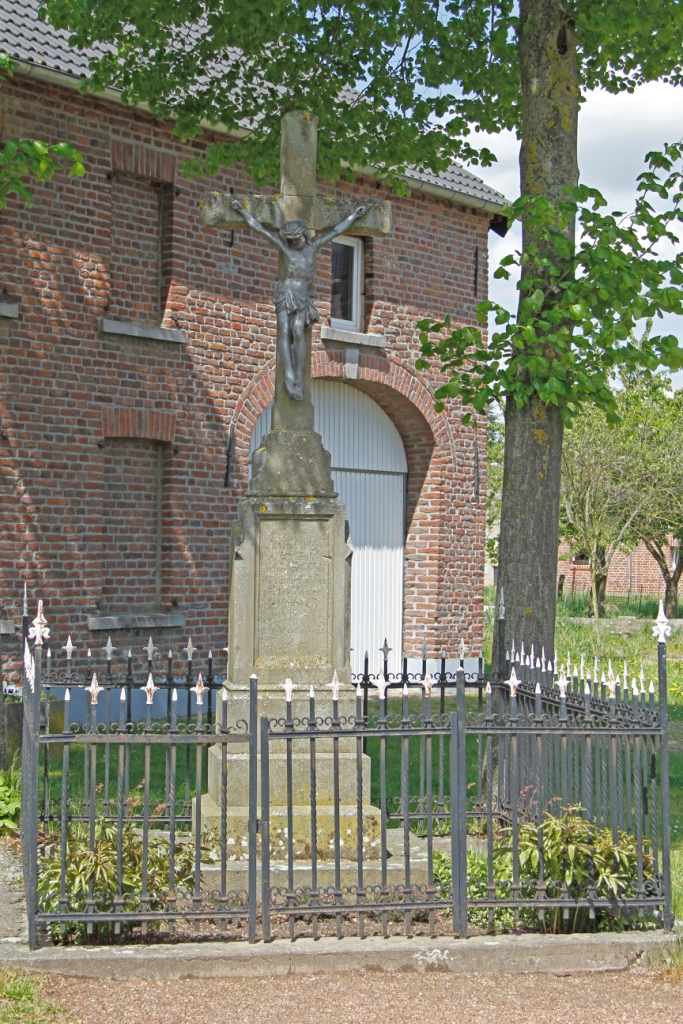
Roadside cross of Vossem

Vossem is a quarter of the German municipality of Gerderath inhabited on March 31, 2013 by 68 people. It belongs to the city of Erkelenz and is located in the district of Heinsberg. The city of Wassenberg is five kilometres distant in western direction.

The former airfield of Wildenrath which was used by the Royal Air Force until 1992 is in vicinity of Vossem. Currently its facilities are a test and validation centre for the German company Siemens.

== History ==
Historical documents dated 1354 mentioned Vossem as Voishem. In 1460 its name changed to Voyssem. The word Vossem bases on the Middle High German word voss (=fox).

Attractions of Vossem are a roadside cross dated 1888 and the cultural heritage Eckarts Hof.
