= Holzweiler =

Norwegian fashion house

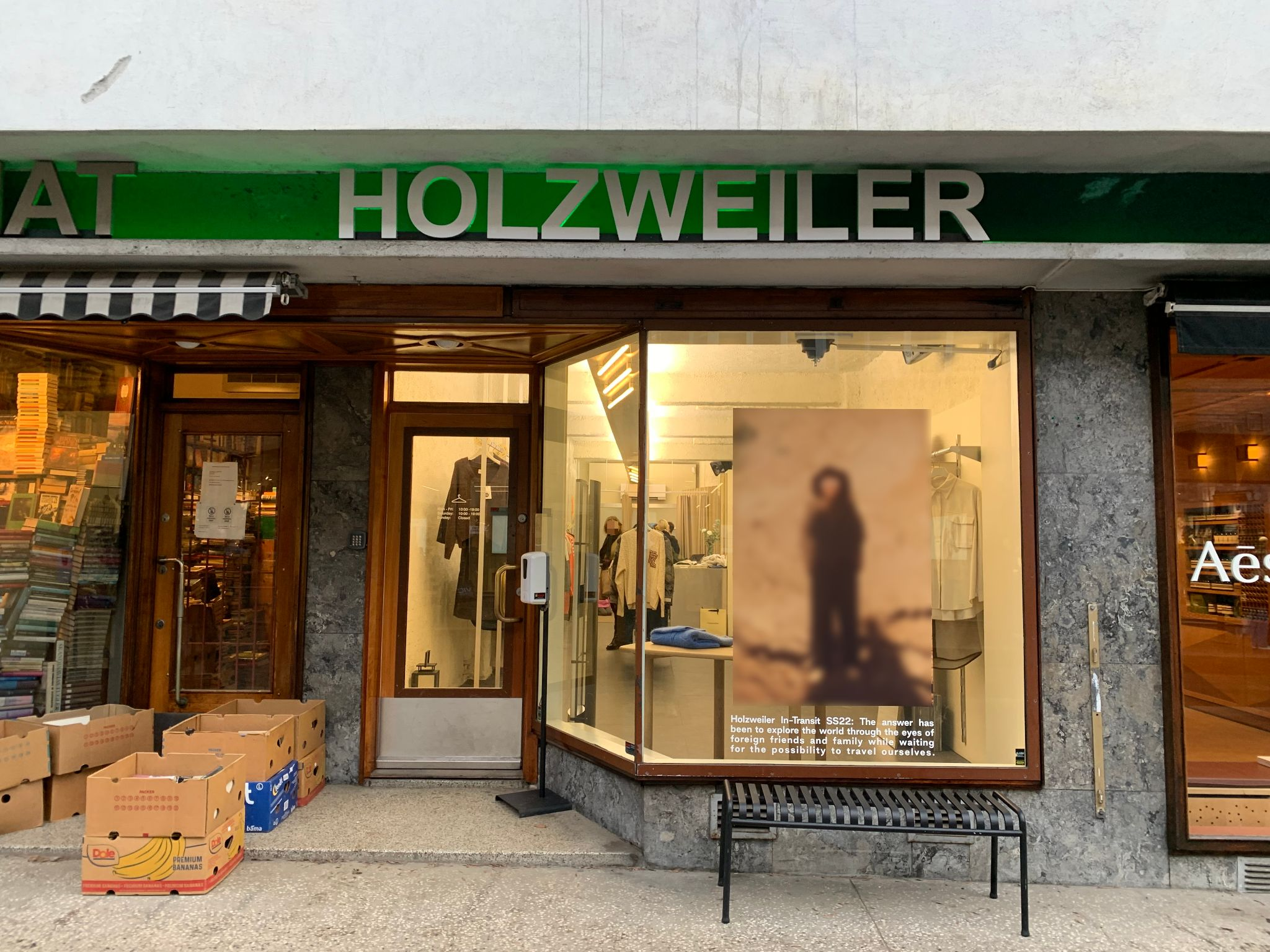
- Industry: fashion industry
- Founded: 2014
- Headquarters: Oslo, Norway
- Products: coats jackets knitwear
- Revenue: 100,790,000 Norwegian krone (2019)
- Number of employees: 61 (2019)
- Website: holzweileroslo.com

Holzweiler is a Norwegian fashion house based in Oslo, Norway. The brand was launched in 2012 by siblings Susanne and Andreas Holzweiler, with Maria Skappel Holzweiler as creative director.

Holzweiler's first collection's consisted of hand-knit scarves sold by the metre; the brand moved into ready-to-wear in autumn 2014 with a focus on coats, jackets, and knitwear. Holzweiler's collections are unisex, with emphasis placed on recycled and compensated materials. The brand is sold in 60 stores in Norway and in 120 stores internationally.

The brand got international attention when supermodel, Gigi Hadid, used an orange hoodie from Holzweiler's collection in 2017.
