= 2018 in architecture =

The year 2018 in architecture involved some significant architectural events and new buildings.

== Events ==
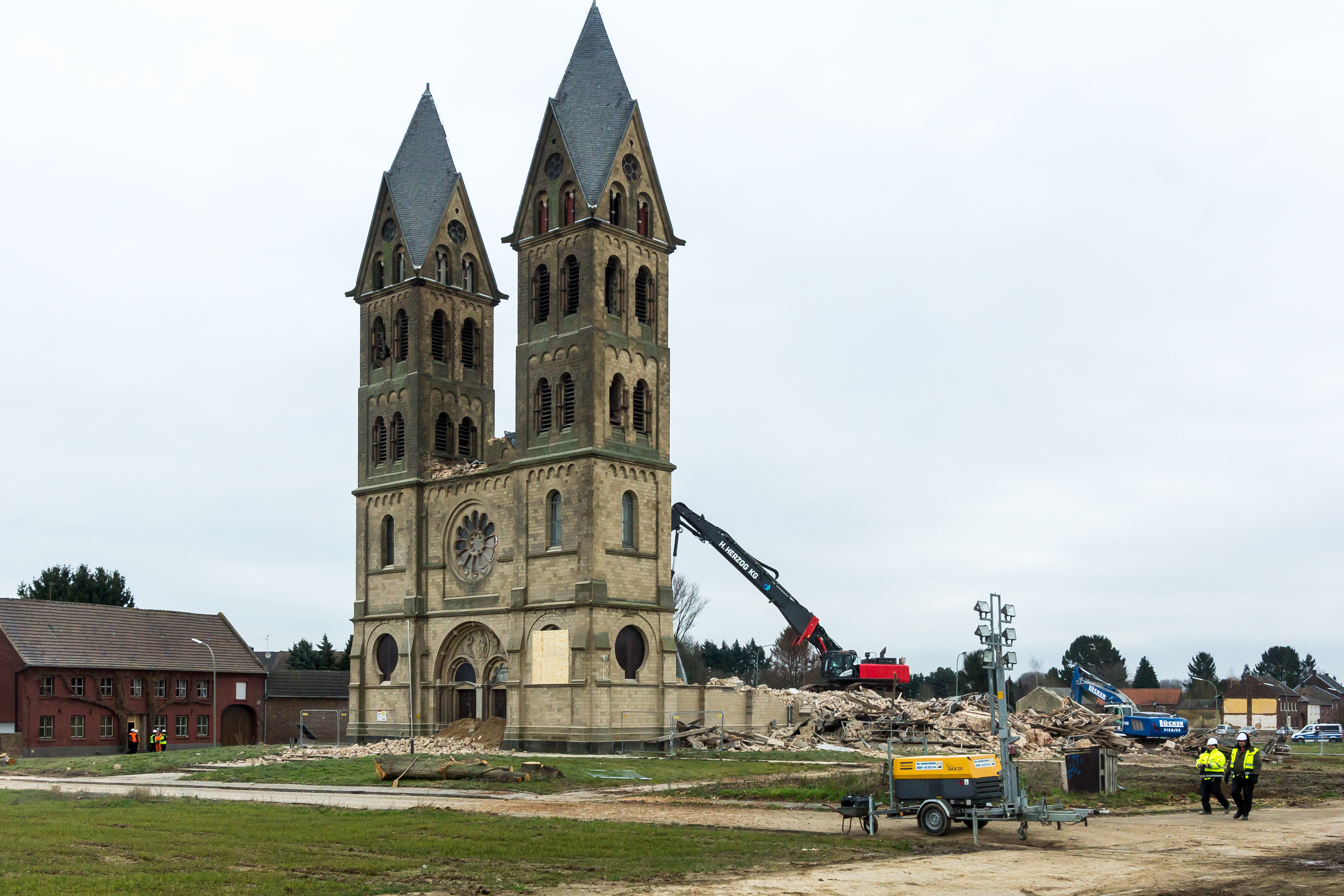
Demolition of the Church of St. Lambertus

- January 9 – The Church of St. Lambertus, Immerath, Germany, is demolished.
- June 15 – The second major fire in four years breaks out at Glasgow School of Art.
- August 14 – The Ponte Morandi, a road viaduct in Genoa, collapses, resulting in 43 deaths and numerous injuries.

== Buildings and structures ==
China

- Hong Kong–Zhuhai–Macau Bridge opened October 23.
- Goldin Finance 117, Tianjin, the third tallest building in China, designed by P & T Group and ECADI, projected for completion.

Denmark

- Fjordenhus, Kirk Kapital headquarters, on Vejle Fjord, designed by Olafur Eliasson and Sebastian Behmann, completed.

Finland

- Helsinki Central Library Oodi, designed by ALA Architects, opened December 5.

France

- Sir John Monash Centre in Villers-Bretonneux officially opened April 24.
- Musée de la Romanité, Nîmes

Hong Kong

- Hong Kong–Zhuhai–Macau Bridge opened October 23.

Ireland

- Pálás cinema, Galway, designed by Tom de Paor, opened February 23.

Malaysia

- Four Seasons Place Kuala Lumpur, the third tallest building in Malaysia, projected for completion.

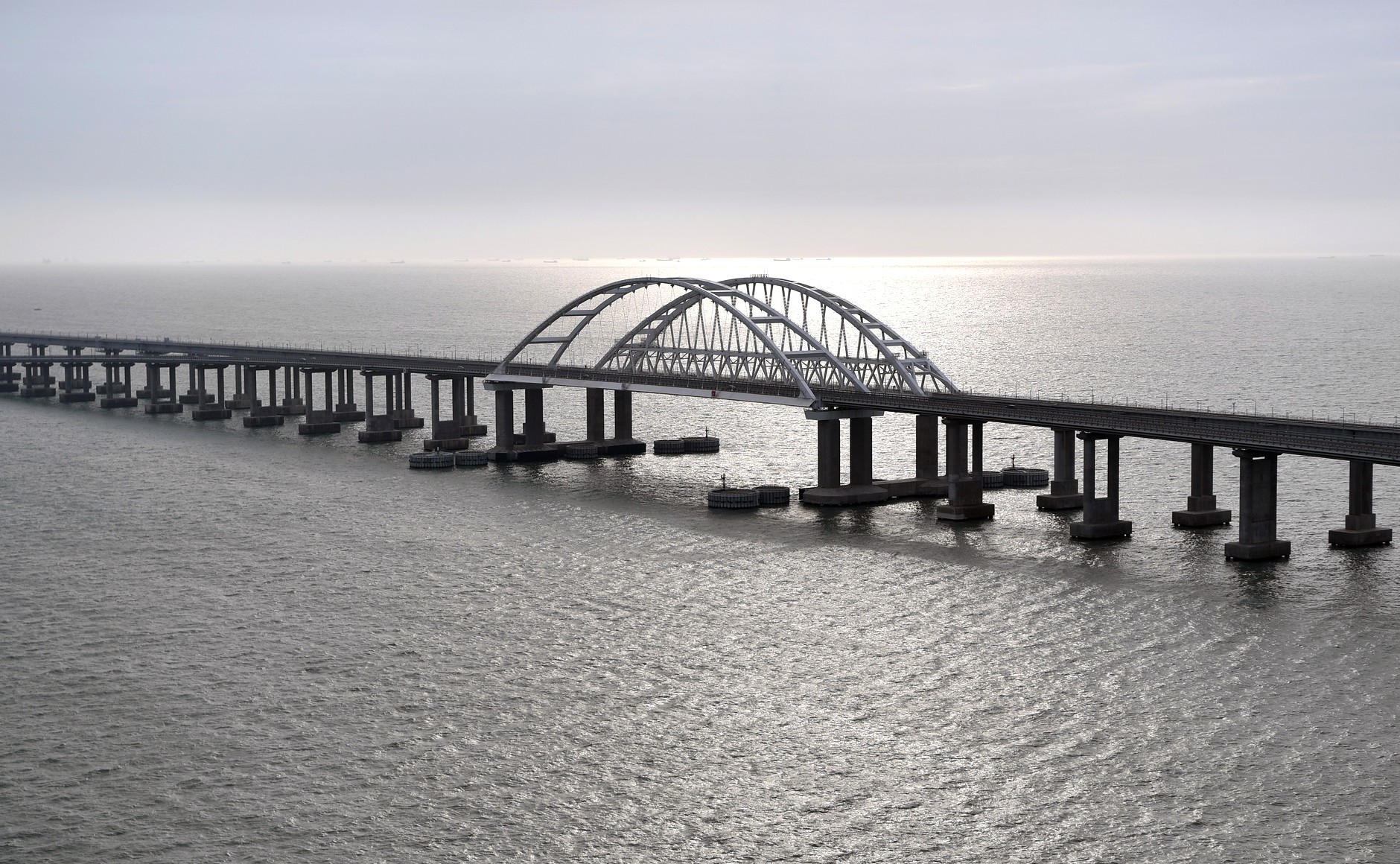
Crimean Bridge between Crimea and Russia

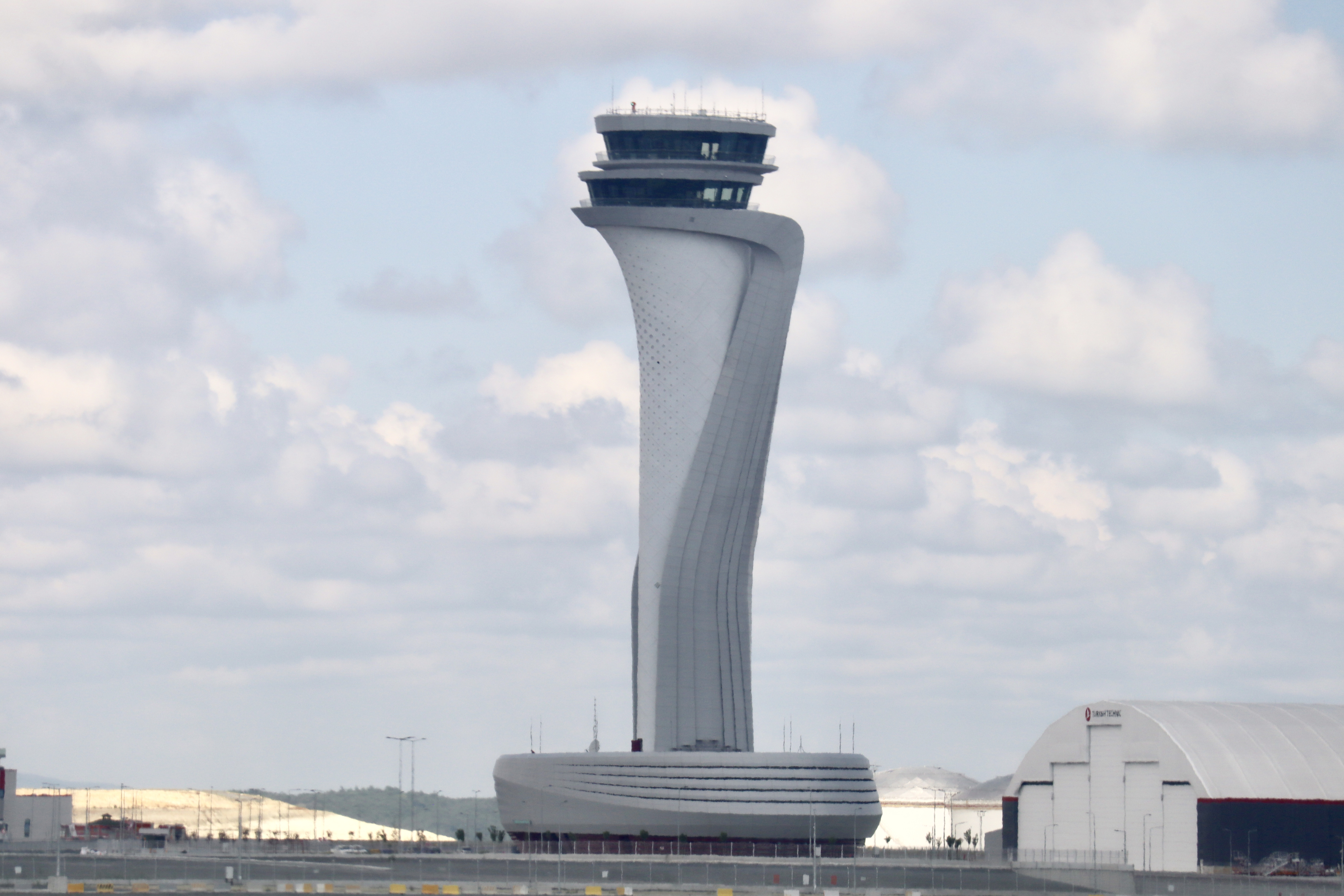
New Istanbul Airport in Arnavutköy, Istanbul, Turkey

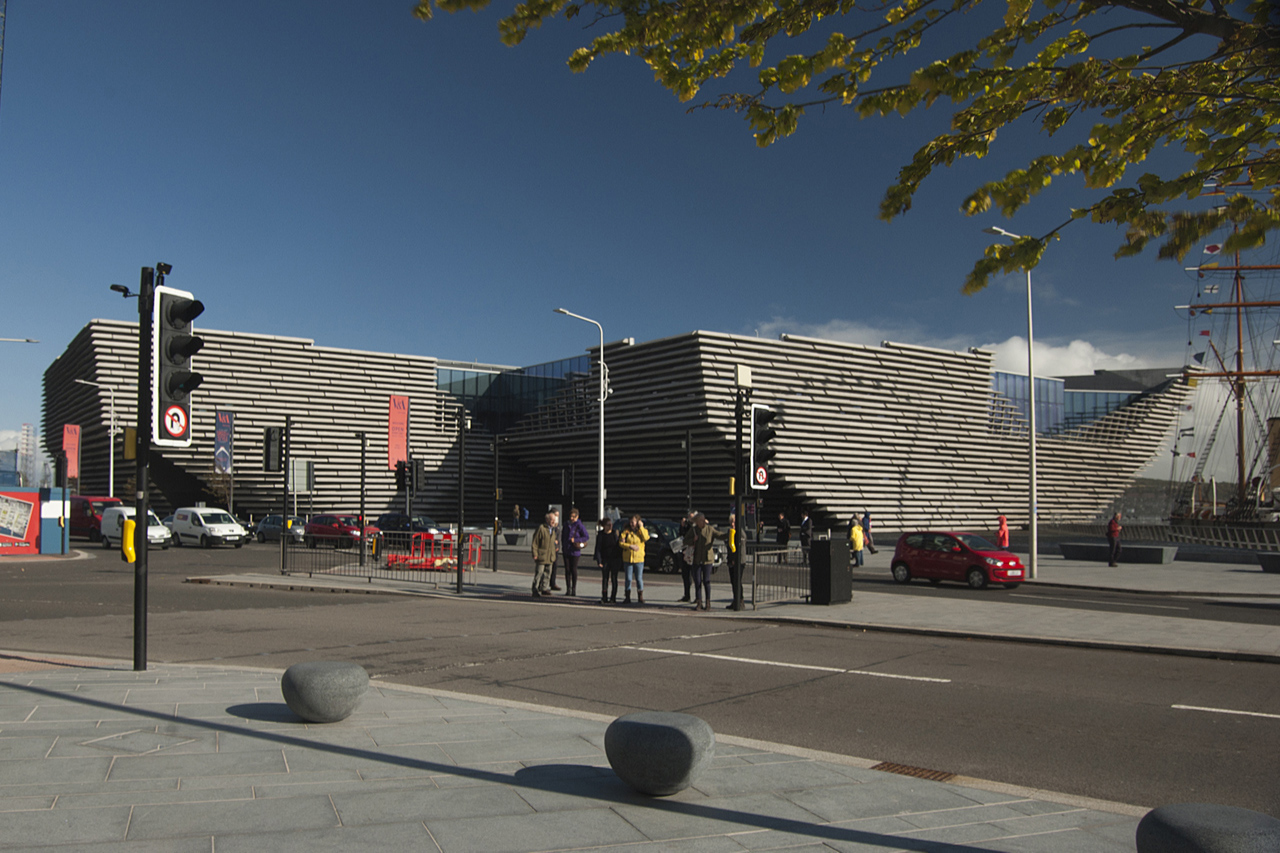
V&A Museum of Design Dundee in Dundee, Scotland

Norway

- Ureddplassen public toilet, designed by Haugen/Zohar Arkitekter + Landskapsfabrikken, opened.

Russia

- Crimean Bridge between Crimea and Russia, the longest bridge in Europe, the road section of the bridge opened May 16.
- Lakhta Center, in St. Petersburg, the tallest building in Europe, commissioning begins June 27.

Spain

- Mac House (Casa Mac), Novelda, designed by La Errería.

Sweden

- Norra Tornen (Northern Towers) eastern residential tower, Stockholm, designed by OMA, completed.

Taiwan

- Weiwuying (National Kaohsiung Centre for the Arts), Kaohsiung, designed by Mecanoo, opened October 13.

Turkey

- Troy Museum, designed by Yalın Mimarlık, opened October 10.
- Istanbul Airport with the future world’s largest terminal, officially opened October 29.

Ukraine

- Chernobyl New Safe Confinement completed.

United Kingdom

- Broomlands Primary School in Kelso, Scottish Borders, designed by Stallan-Brand, opened January 9.
- Storey's Field Community Centre and Nursery for the University of Cambridge at Eddington, designed by Stuart McKnight of MUMA (McInnes Usher McKnight Architects), completed c. March.
- Beecroft Building for the University of Oxford Department of Physics, designed by Hawkins\Brown, officially opened September 17.
- The Hubert Perrodo Building at St Peter's College, Oxford, by Design Engine Architects, officially opened March 13.
- Queen's Diamond Jubilee Galleries in Westminster Abbey, London, designed by MUMA (McInnes Usher McKnight Architects) and Max Fordham, opened to public June 11.
- V&A Museum of Design Dundee in Dundee, Scotland, designed by Kengo Kuma, opened September 15.
- Coal Drops Yard at King's Cross Central in London, conversion of industrial premises to retail development by Thomas Heatherwick, opened October 26.
- Gloucester Bus Station, designed by Building Design Partnership, opened October 26–28.
- The Macallan distillery, Craigellachie, Moray, Scotland, designed by Rogers Stirk Harbour + Partners, new building opened.
- Nevill Holt Opera within 17th-century stable block, designed by Witherford Watson Mann, opened June 14.

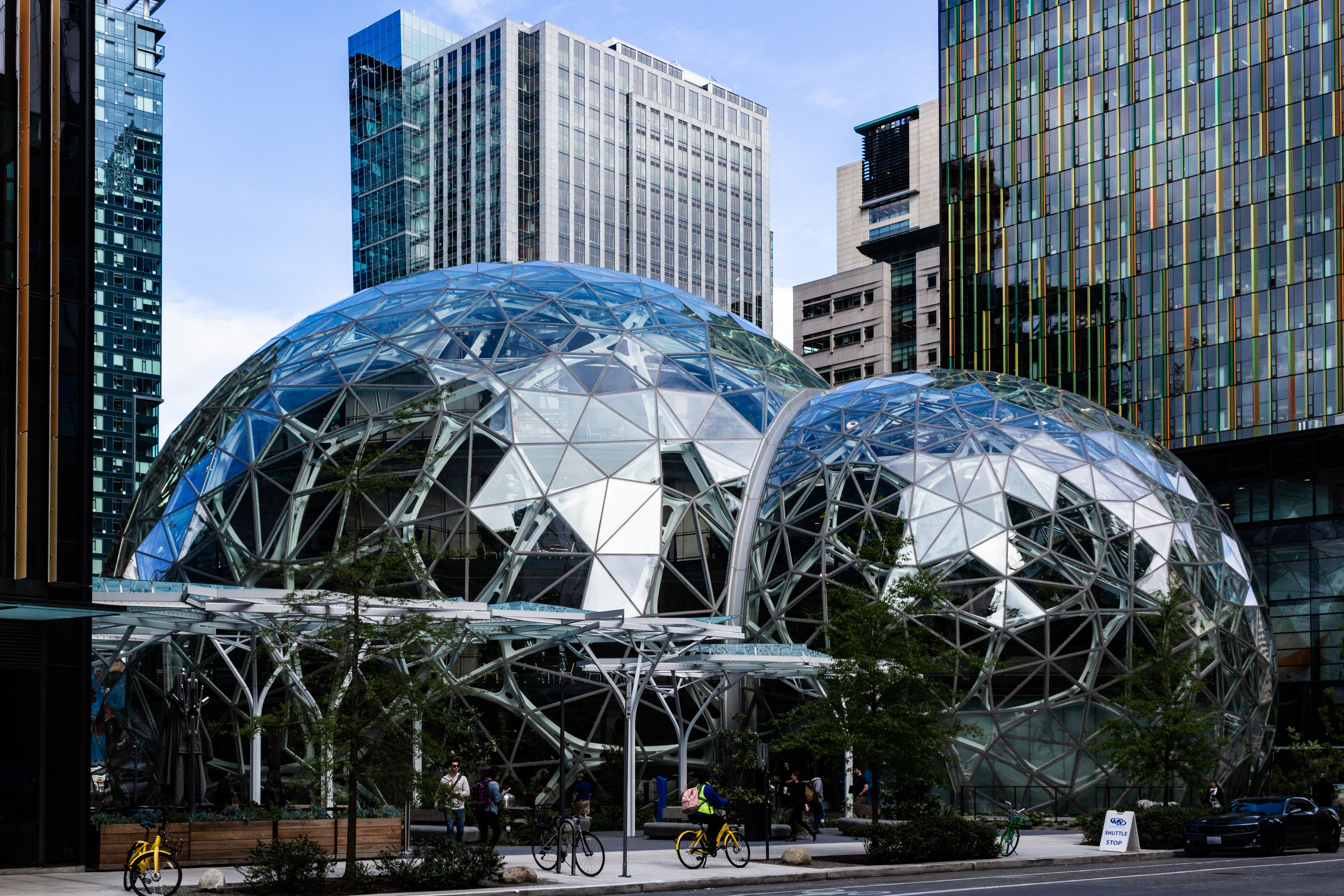
Amazon Spheres in Seattle, USA

- Mapleton Crescent, Wandsworth (high-rise prefabricated apartments), designed by Metropolitan Workshop.
- Wittering House, Finsbury Park, home for self by Charles Bettes of GPad London, completed.
- House in the Garden, Notting Hill, London, designed by Gianni Botsford, completed.

United States

- Amazon Spheres in Seattle, designed by NBBJ, opened January 30.
- Institute for Contemporary Art at VCU in Richmond, Virginia designed by Steven Holl opened April 21.
- Stir restaurant at the Philadelphia Museum of Art (architectural interior) designed by Frank Gehry opened October 12.
- 3 World Trade Center in New York City, designed by Rogers Stirk Harbour + Partners, opened June 11.

Vietnam

- Landmark 81 in Ho Chi Minh City is completed making it the tallest building in Vietnam.

== Exhibitions ==
- 26 May until 25 November - The 16th Venice Biennale of Architecture in Venice, Italy
- 15 July until 13 January 2019 - "Towards a Concrete Utopia: Architecture in Yugoslavia 1948-1980" at MOMA in New York City.

== Awards ==
- AIA Gold Medal – James Stewart Polshek
- Architecture Firm Award AIA – Snow Kreilich Architects
- Driehaus Architecture Prize for New Classical Architecture – Marc Breitman & Nada Breitman-Jakov
- Emporis Skyscraper Award – MGM Cotai
- Lawrence Israel Prize - Annabelle Selldorf
- Pritzker Architecture Prize – Balkrishna Doshi
- RAIA Gold Medal – Alexander Tzannes
- RIBA Royal Gold Medal – Neave Brown
- Stirling Prize – Foster and Partners for Bloomberg London
- Thomas Jefferson Medal in Architecture – Sir David Adjaye
- Vincent Scully Prize – Inga Saffron and Robert Campbell

== Deaths ==
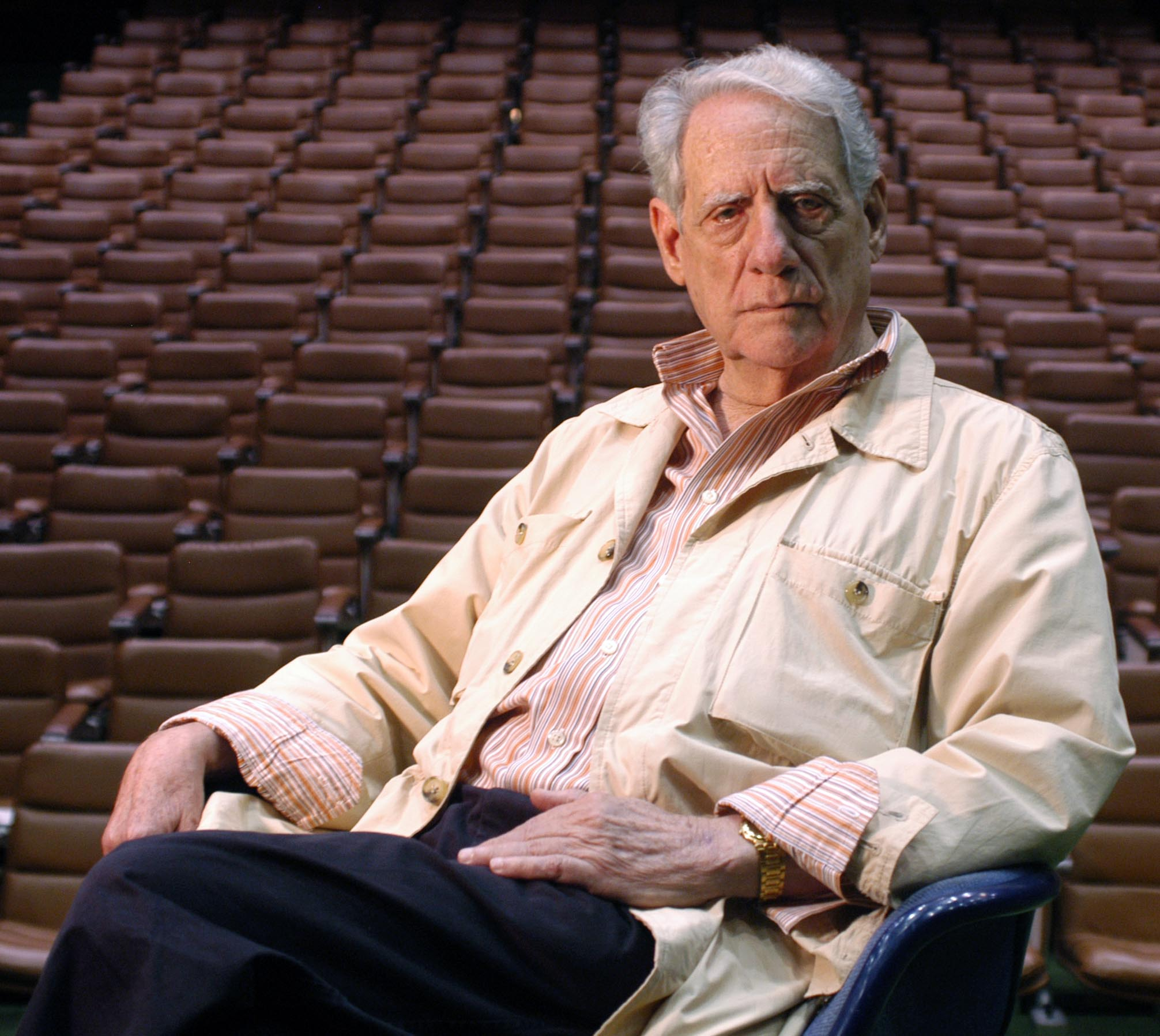
Rafael Calventi

- January 7 – Aydın Boysan, 96, Turkish architect
- January 9 – Neave Brown, 88, American-born British architect
- January 17 – Ted McCoy, 92, New Zealand architect
- February 18 – Ivor Smith, 93, English architect
- February 19 – Teresa Gisbert Carbonell, 91, Bolivian architect and art historian
- February 20 – Lionel March, 84, British architect and mathematician
- February 22 – Serban Cantacuzino, 90, French-born Romanian-British architect
- April 26 – David Mitchell, 77, New Zealand architect
- May 12 – Will Alsop, 70, British architect
- May 18 – Tom Wolfe, 88, American author and architecture critic (From Bauhaus to Our House)
- May 28 – Wang Da-hong, 100, Chinese born Taiwanese architect
- August 19 – Rafael Calventi, 92, Dominican architect and diplomat
- August 26 – Kerry Hill, 75, Australian architect
- September 13 – Shlomo Aronson, 81, Israeli landscape architect
- September 18 – Robert Venturi, 93, American architect, Pritzker Prize winner (1991) and co-author with Denise Scott Brown of Learning from Las Vegas
- October 11 – Paul Andreu, 80, French architect (Osaka Maritime Museum)
- November 24 – Gene Leedy, 90, American architect
- December 27 – Jean Dumontier, 83, Canadian-Quebecois architect and artist (the Montreal Metro stations Jean-Drapeau and Longueuil–Université-de-Sherbrooke)

== See also ==
- Timeline of architecture
