= Church of St. Martin, Borschemich =

Church of St. Martin
- Filialkirche St. Martinus
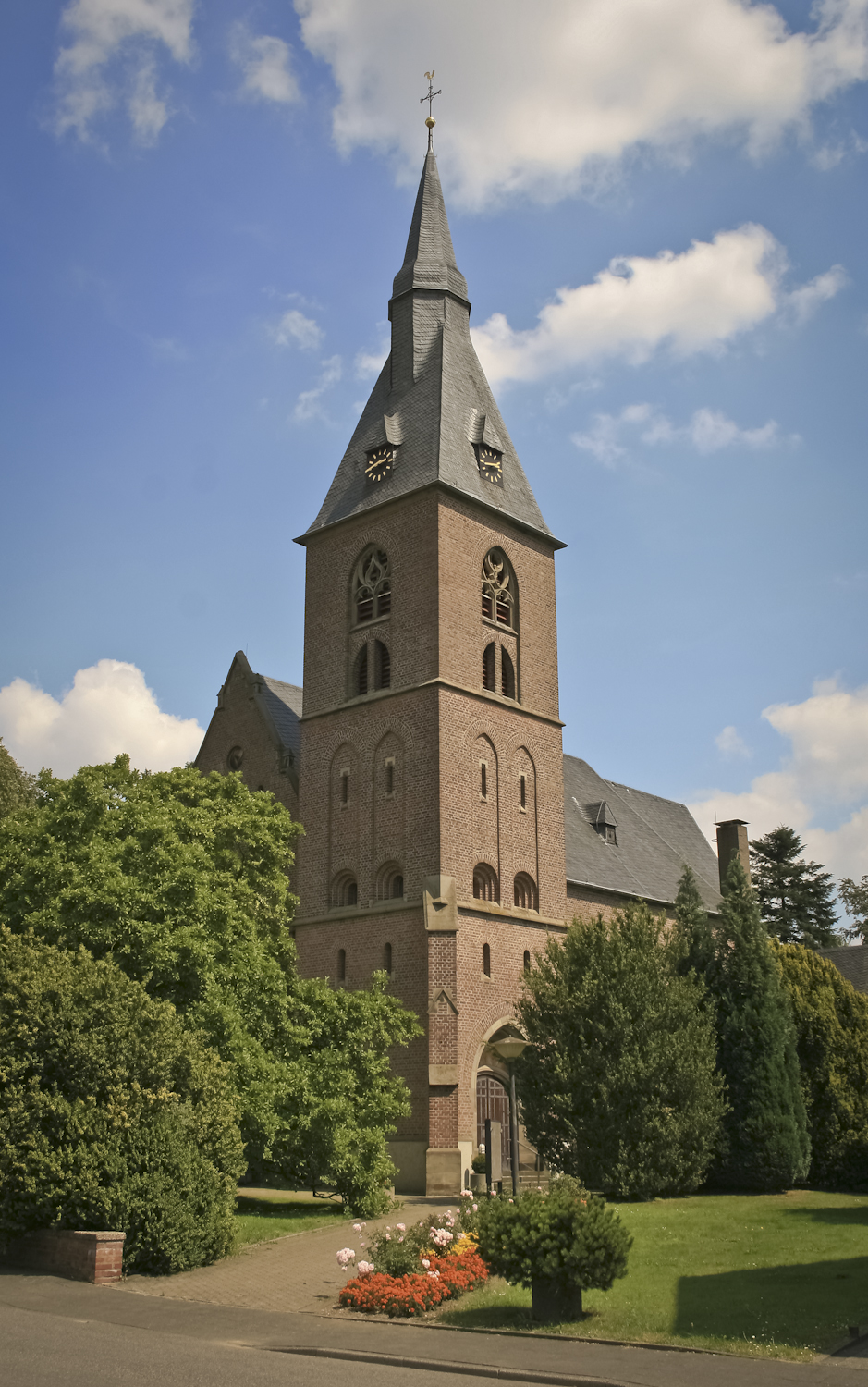
- The church in 2007

- 51°05′40″N 6°19′47″E
- Location: Borschemich, Erkelenz, North Rhine-Westphalia
- Country: Germany
- Denomination: Roman Catholic

History
- Status: Church
- Dedication: Martin of Tours
- Consecrated: 27 October 1907

Architecture
- Functional status: Demolished
- Architect: Heinrich Renard
- Style: Gothic Revival
- Years built: 1906–1907
- Closed: 23 November 2014
- Demolished: February 2016

Specifications
- Materials: Brick

Administration
- Diocese: Aachen

The Church of St. Martin (German: Filialkirche St. Martinus) was a Roman Catholic church in the village of Borschemich, Erkelenz in North Rhine-Westphalia, Germany, dedicated to Saint Martin of Tours. It was built between 1906 and 1907 in the Gothic Revival style to designs of the architect Heinrich Renard. It took over the role from a medieval church which was located nearby, which was demolished upon completion of the new building.

The church was deconsecrated in 2014, and it was demolished in February 2016 as part of the destruction of the entire village of Borschemich in order to make way for the Garzweiler surface mine. A new smaller church with the same dedication was built as its replacement in Neu-Borschemich between 2013 and 2015.

== History ==
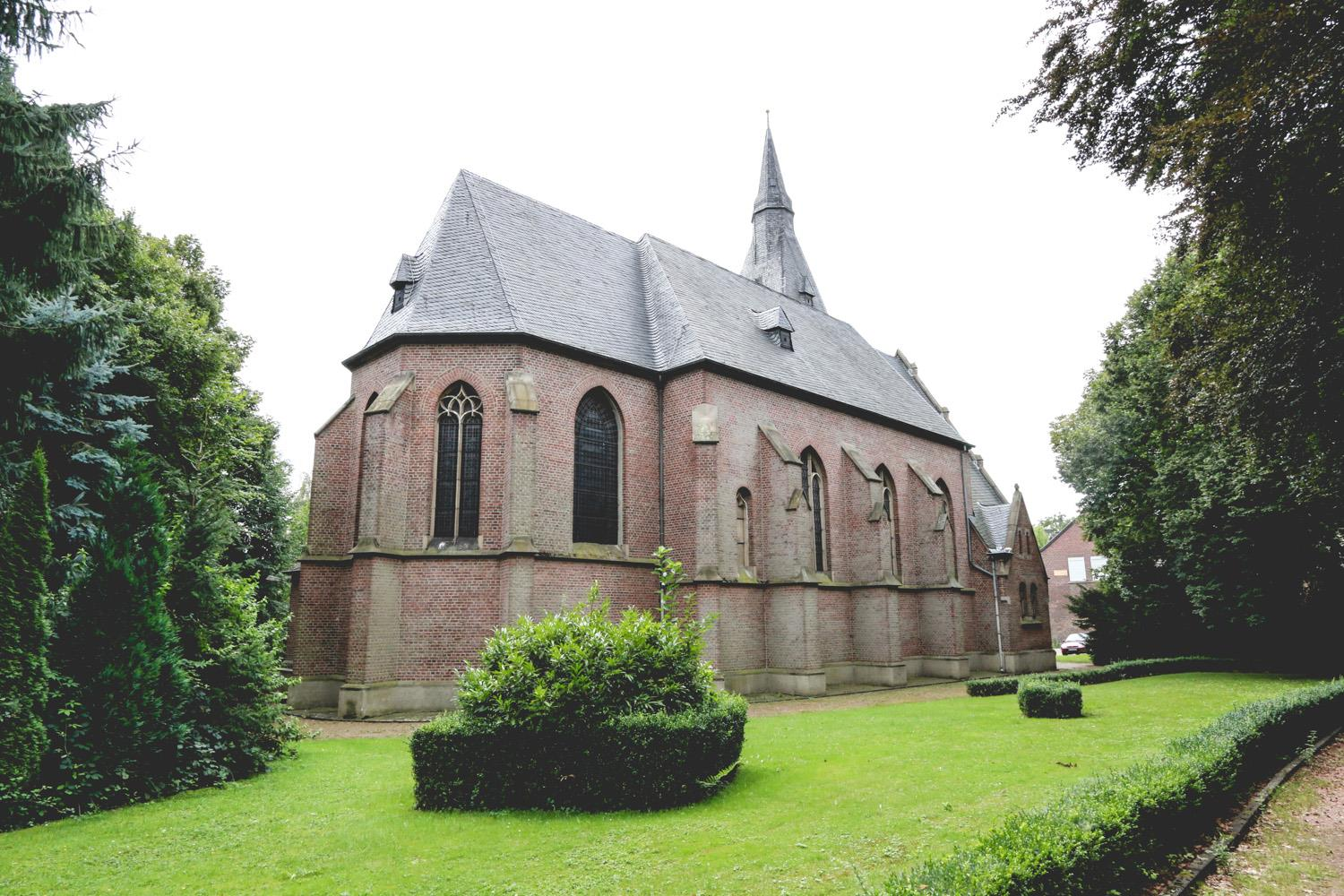
Rear view of the church in 2014

The Church of St. Martin was built between 1906 and 1907 according to designs of the architect Heinrich Renard and under the direction of the contractor Max Sauer. It was blessed on 27 October 1907 by dean Hermann Josef Kamp from Erkelenz, on behalf of the Archbishop of Cologne, Anton Hubert Fischer. The church was consecrated in honour of Saint Martin of Tours on 9 October 1915 by the auxiliary bishop Peter Joseph Lausberg.

The building took over the role of an earlier church, which was originally built in the 12th century, and was rebuilt in 1451 and renamed, extended and reconstructed in 1784. By the 19th century, the old church was insufficient, and it was demolished after the completion of the new church building

The church was built out of brick, and it had a single aisle with three bays in the nave, behind which was a triumphal arch and a choir. It had arched groin vaults. The three-storey bell tower was 35 m (115 ft) high, and it stood at the southern corner of the church. The building had a capacity of 150 people seated and 100 standing.

The church suffered some damage in 1945 during World War II, but it was repaired in 1950. A comprehensive renovation of both the exterior and interior was undertaken in 1982.

=== Deconsecration and demolition ===
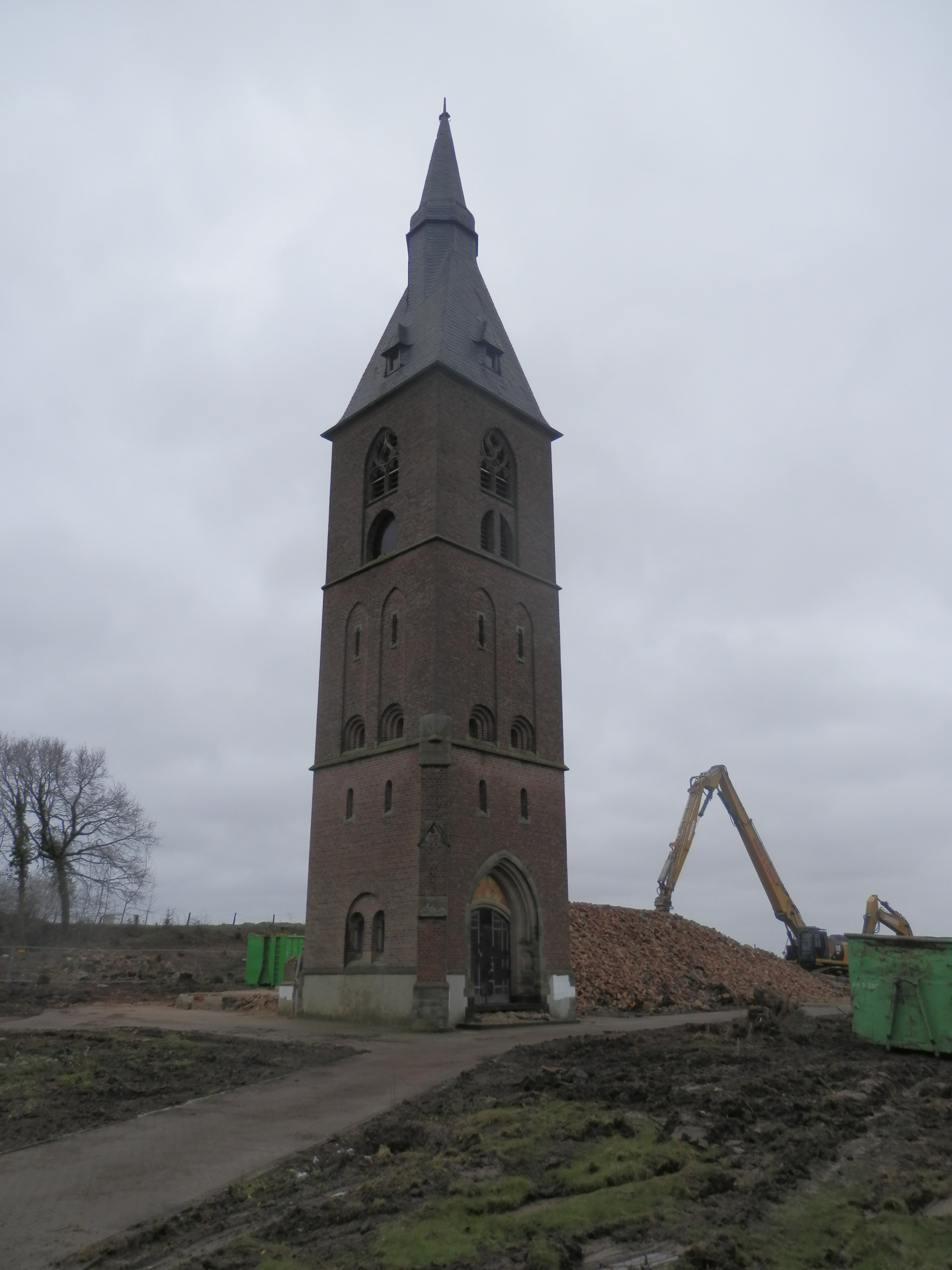
Demolition in February 2016

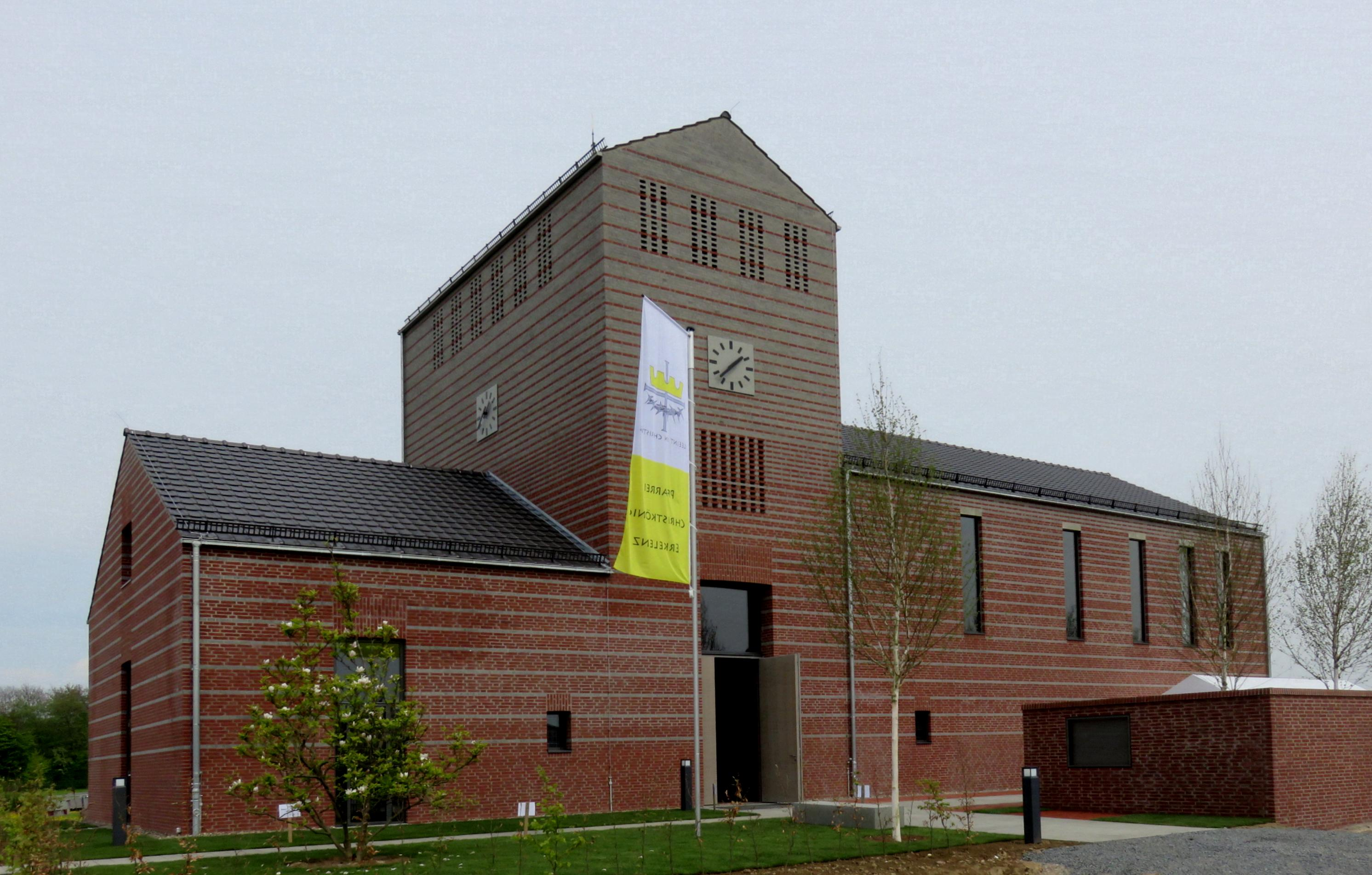
Replacement church in Neu-Borschemich

The village of Borschemich was on the planned route for the extension of the Garzweiler surface mine, a large lignite mine operated by the company RWE. The entire village was therefore demolished in the 2010s, with the company building a new settlement known as Neu-Borschemich as its replacement. RWE purchased the Church of St. Martin in 2013, and it was deconsecrated on 23 November 2014. The village's other major landmark, the Haus Paland, was demolished in 2015. Demolition of the church began at 10:00 am on 15 February 2016. The sacristy was demolished first, followed by the sanctuary. The tower was demolished a few days later.

== See also ==
- Church of St. Lambertus, Immerath
- Church of Heilig Kreuz, Keyenberg
- Church of St. Simon and Judas Thaddäus, Otzenrath
