= Claddagh Palace =

Cinema in Salthill in Galway, Ireland

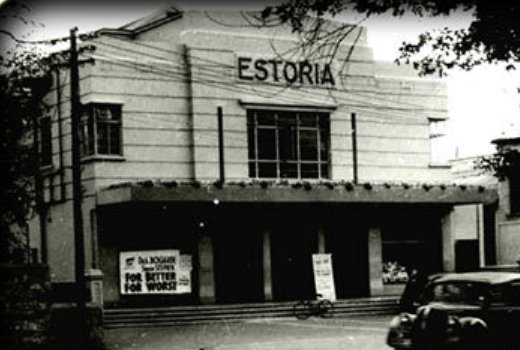
- The cinema while operating as the Estoria, c. 1954
- Interactive map of Claddagh Palace

General information
- Status: Demolished
- Type: Cinema
- Location: Lower Salthill Rd, Galway City, Ireland
- Coordinates: 53.26780494654271°N 9.066137640893347°W
- Opened: November 22, 1939; 86 years ago

Design and construction
- Architect: Hubert O’Connor

Other information
- Seating capacity: 776

The Claddagh Palace was a cinema located in Lower Salthill in Galway, Ireland. Originally called the Estoria, it opened its doors in 1939, and was in business for over 50 years. The cinema closed in 1995, and was ultimately redeveloped as an apartment complex.

== History ==
The Estoria Cinema opened at Nile Lodge, Galway, on 22 November 1939. Designed by Hubert O’Connor and built by John McNally & Co, it seated 776 people and offered nightly showings at 6.45pm and 8.45pm, with additional matinees on Thursdays, Saturdays, and Sundays. Early films included The Great Waltz, Convict 99, Prison Without Bars, and That Certain Age. Gone With The Wind and Phantom of the Opera were among the most popular screenings, with John Wayne the most favoured actor.

During the war and postwar period, cinemas were required to feature live performances to avoid tax; Peg Folan was the Estoria's resident musician. The cinema staff included chief cashier Annie McDonald, projectionist Vincent Fahy, and long-time manager Frank Wrafter, who remained until the venue's change of ownership in 1973, when it was renamed The Claddagh Palace.

For children growing up in the 1940s and 1950s, the Sunday matinee serials, featuring characters like Kit Carson and Captain Marvel, were a major weekly highlight. Known locally as the “Shtora” or “Shtoa”, the building later shared space with the Galway Printing Company (from 1952) and was ultimately replaced by an apartment block. Its final days were documented in a nostalgic film, Palace of Dreams, by Donal Haughey in 1996. The last movie to be shown at the Claddagh Palace was Waterworld.

The Claddagh Palace played host to the Galway Film Fleadh from its inception in 1989, until 1995, when the fleadh relocated to the Town Hall Theatre.

== See also ==
- Pálás cinema, established in 2018
