= Tom de Paor =

Irish architect (born 1967)

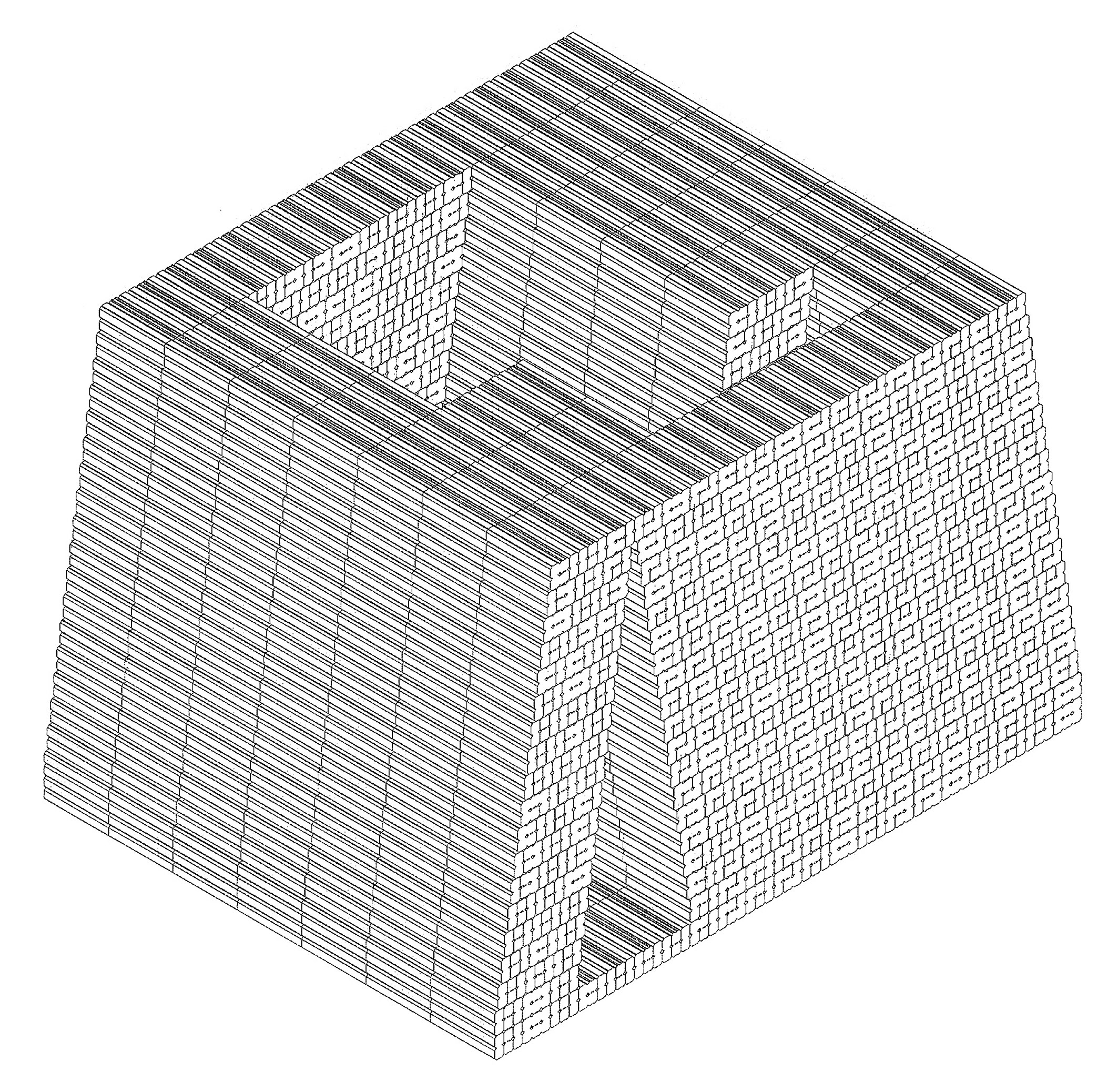
N^{3}, the inaugural Irish pavilion for the Venice biennale (2000)

Tomás "Tom" de Paor FRIAI Int FRIBA (/də ˈpweɪr/; born 1967) is an Irish architect and member of Aosdána.

== Early life ==
de Paor was born in London in 1967 and raised in County Clare.

== Career ==
de Paor studied architecture at TU Dublin (1985–88) and in UCD (1989–91), where he graduated with first-class honours. He studied horticulture at the Botanic Gardens Dublin (2022–25).

=== Built works ===
In 1991 he won the international competition for the design of a reception building at the Royal Gunpowder Mills at Ballincollig, County Cork, which won an AAI award in 1993 and an RIAI award in 1994.

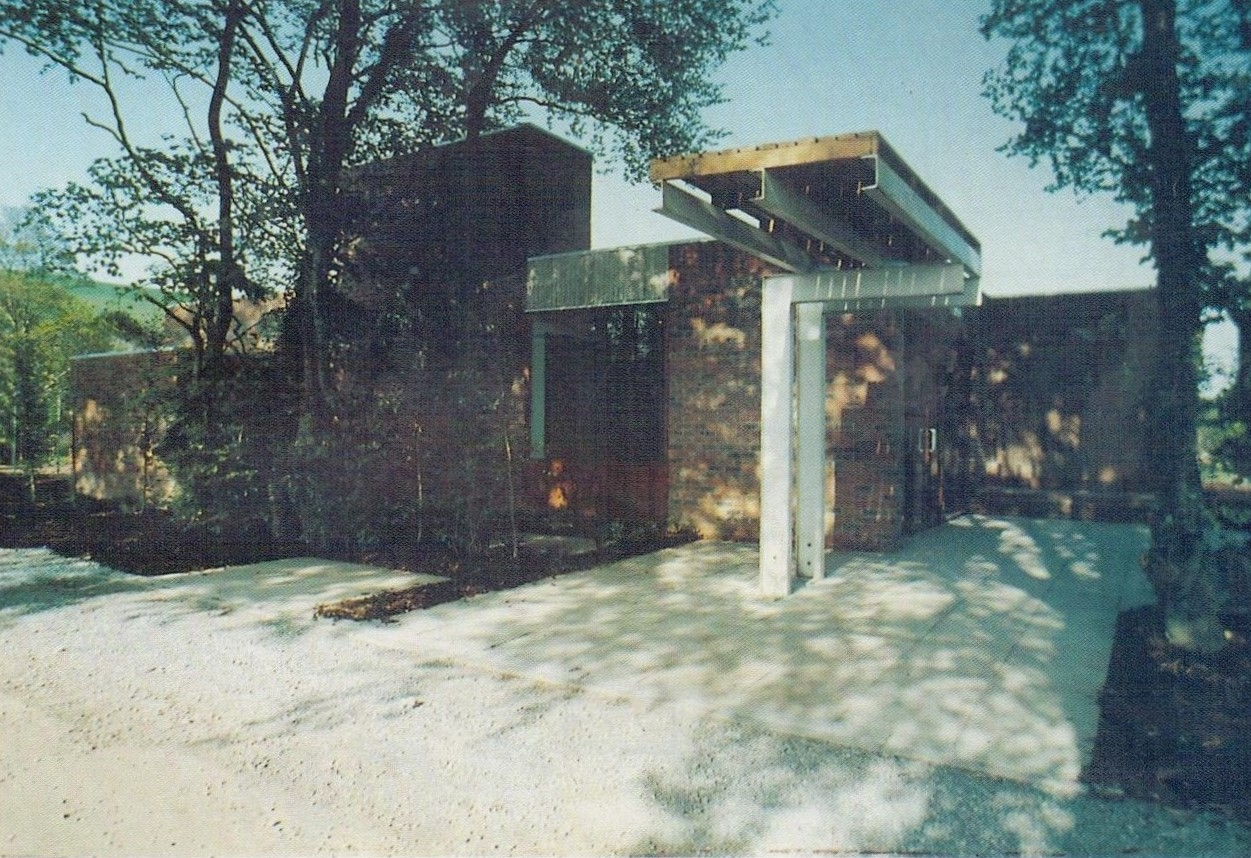
Gatehouse, Royal Gunpowder Mills, Ballincollig. (1993)

Since then his public portfolio has included landscape and building works to the A13 in Barking and Dagenham in London (1996), the National Sculpture Factory Cork (1998), Comhdháil Naisiúnta na Gaeilge Dublin (1999), Clontarf Pumpstation and public realm (2007), Irish Aid Centre Dublin (2008), Druid Theatre Galway (2009) and the Landside Bar at Dublin airport (2011).

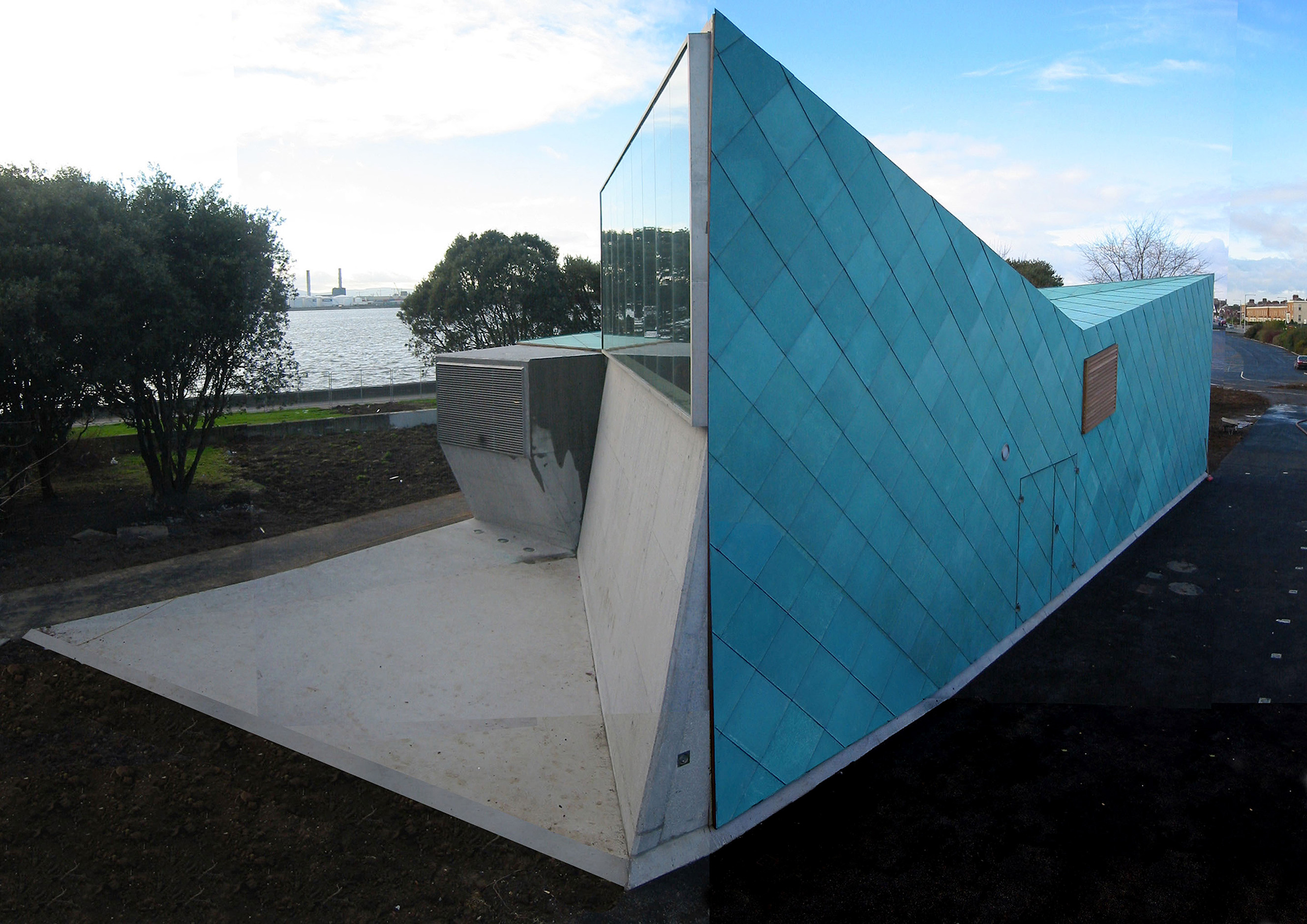
Pumpstation and streetscape, Clontarf. (2007)

de Paor designed the Pálás cinema in Galway (2017), which was awarded an AAI and RIAI award for Best Cultural Building, two Irish Concrete Society awards, two Civic Trust awards and a World Architecture Award.

He has also designed a number of award-winning retail spaces, one-off houses and gardens, both urban and rural, across Ireland — most notably at Dysart in Wicklow.

His work has been twice nominated for the EU Mies Van Der Rohe award, in 2005 for Clontarf Pumpstation and Public Realm and in 2007 for John Dillon Street.

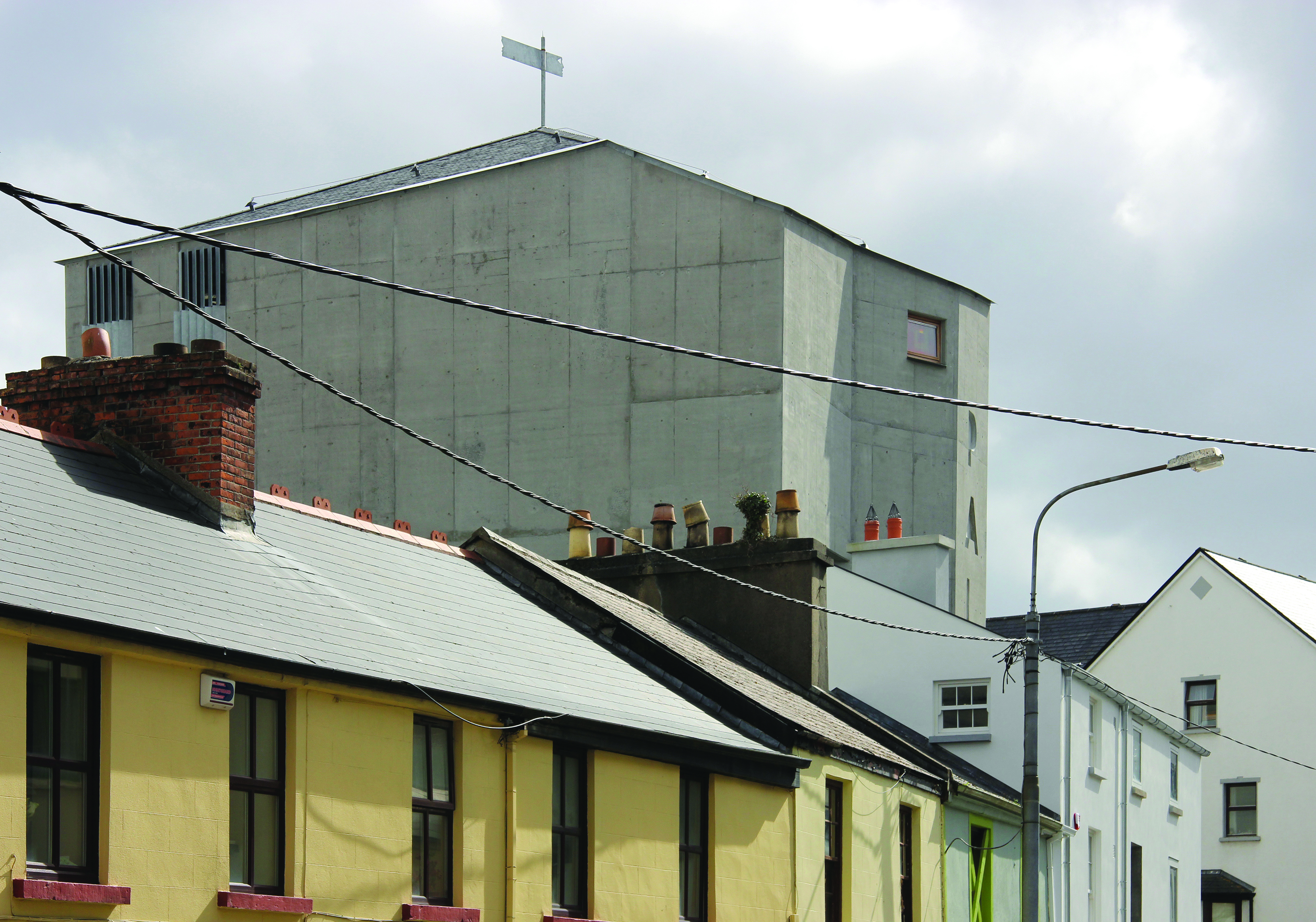
Pálás Cinema, Galway. (2017)

=== Exhibitions ===
In 1999 he contributed to the Arts Council of Ireland Schools Show and in 2000 he was invited to design the inaugural Irish representation at the Venice Architecture Biennale and he contributed to subsequent Irish Pavilions in 2006, 2008 and in 2010, which he co-curated. He exhibited in the international pavilion in 2010 and 2018. He represented Europe in New Trends of Architecture Europe and Japan in 2001.

In 2010 he made a pavilion for EVA International, in 2015 he contributed a board game to The Souvenir Project at LIMINAL, and in 2025 he coauthored the inaugural Royal Hibernian Academy pavilion.

In 2022 de Paor staged the retrospective exhibition ‘i see Earth: building and ground: 1991–2021’, supported by the Arts Council of Ireland, The Irish Architecture Foundation and Visual Carlow.

He also designed two stage sets for Manchán Magan.

His drawings have been exhibited internationally, including the Royal Academy, and the Venice Biennale. His notebooks were the subject of an exhibition, and later published. His watercolours were the subject of a solo show at the Sarah Walker Gallery.

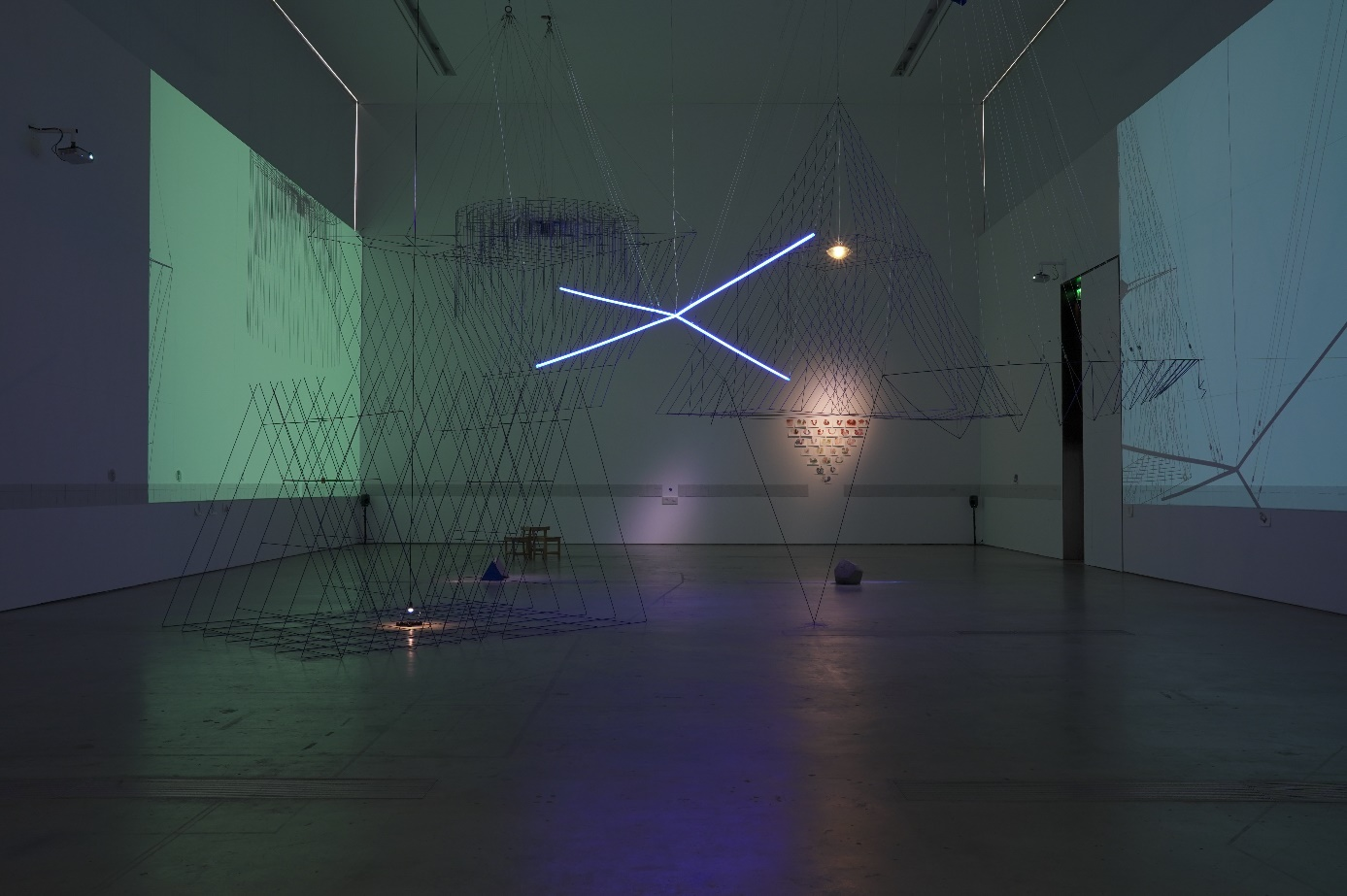
‘i see Earth: Building and ground: 1991-2021', Carlow VISUAL (2022)

== Recognition ==
In 2003, he was elected a Fellow of the Royal Institute of the Architects of Ireland and voted Young Architect of the Year by Building Design and Corus. In 2015 he was elected to Aosdána, and in 2017 became an International Fellow of the Royal Institute of British Architects, and was described as "the leading Irish architect of his generation".

== Teaching ==
From 1991 to 2022 he taught at University College Dublin and various schools of architecture internationally, delivering programs at Pontificia Universidad Catolica, Santiago, Chile, the Porto Academy, and the Harvard Graduate School of Design, where he was Design Critic from 2016-21 He has been an external examiner at the schools of architecture at Kent and Glasgow Mackintosh School of Art since 2018.

== Personal life ==
de Paor lives and works in Windgates, Greystones, County Wicklow.

== Bibliography ==
- ‘N3’, ISBN 978-0-9540422-0-2
- ‘Circle Book’, Gall edition the Office of Public Works, at Chancery Street, Dublin.
- ‘Reservoir’, Gall edition, ISBN 978-0-9566293-1-9
- ‘Irlanda’, Gall edition, ISBN 978-0-9566293-0-2
- ‘Of’, Gall edition, ISBN 978-0-9566293-2-6
- 'desert’, the Notations series University of Ulster, Gall edition, ISBN 978-0-9566293-5-7

== Documentary ==
His work has been the subject of several documentaries and films -

- ‘The Notebook’, Secret Laboratory, P. Clarke (2012)
- ‘Dysart’, Secret Laboratory, P. Clarke (2012)
- 'Drawing on Life', P. Clarke (2013)
- 'Tomorrow is Saturday', G.Marsh, G.Ohle (2020)
- 'Drape', Peter Maybury (2018)
- 'On being there', Peter Maybury (2020)
- 'L'esprit de l'escalier', Peter Maybury (2025)
