= Pálás cinema =

Cinema and arts venue in Galway, Ireland

The Pálás
- The Palace
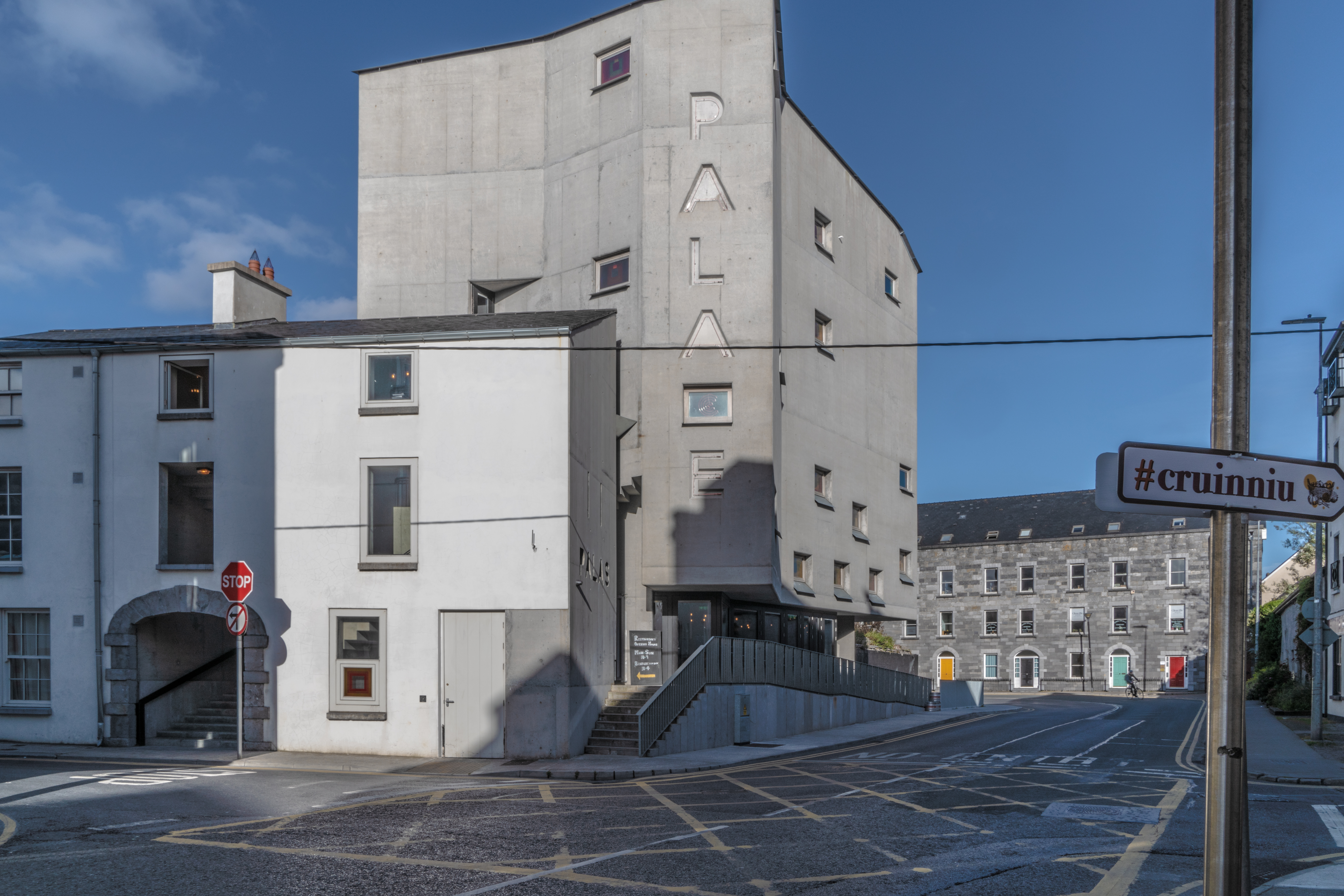
- Pálás with the "PALACE" name on its side
- Interactive map of The Pálás
- Address: Galway, County Galway; Ireland
- Coordinates: 53°16′11″N 9°03′10″W
- Owner: Galway City Council
- Operator: Light House Cinema

Construction
- Opened: 23 February 2018
- Closed: 27 February 2025
- Architect: Tom de Paor

Website
- www.palas.ie

Pálás (English: "Palace") was a cinema in Galway city, Ireland. It opened in 2018, and closed in February 2025 due to financial losses. The building is owned by Galway City Council and was operated by the Light House Cinema group, as part of the Europa Cinemas network of local art-house cinemas.

== Construction ==
The site, for Galway's Solas Picture Palace, was first identified in 2004. The venue was designed by Tom de Paor, and awarded an AAI and RIAI award for "Best Cultural Building", two Irish Concrete Society awards, two Civic Trust awards and a World Architecture Award. The site was completed in 2017 by the Solas Galway Picture Palace Company, which later went into liquidation in 2020. The cinema included a bar with facilities for board games.

== Operations ==
The site hosted premiere screenings, parties and quiz nights, and was a key venue for the Galway Film Fleadh and Galway Film Society. It also hosted a book club.

== Closure ==
In December 2024, the operators announced that they would be ceasing operations at the venue in early 2025.

Public meetings were held by concerned citizens, under the "Save Pálás" banner, to find ways to keep the cinema in operation as a cultural space. In January 2025, a city council meeting was delayed due to protests about the closure. A protest outside the venue was held on 22 February, one week before the scheduled closure.

== Future ==
A group including former RTÉ chair Siún Ní Raghallaigh and Galway Film Fleadh founder Lelia Doolan was formed in 2025 to try to re-open the cinema.

The venue was used again temporarily for screenings during the 2025 Film Fleadh.

== See also ==
- Claddagh Palace, a nearby cinema that closed in 1995
- Pallas Castle, County Galway; one of the best-preserved examples of a tower house in Ireland
