= Church of St. Lambertus, Immerath =

Church of St. Lambertus
- Pfarrkirche St. Lambertus
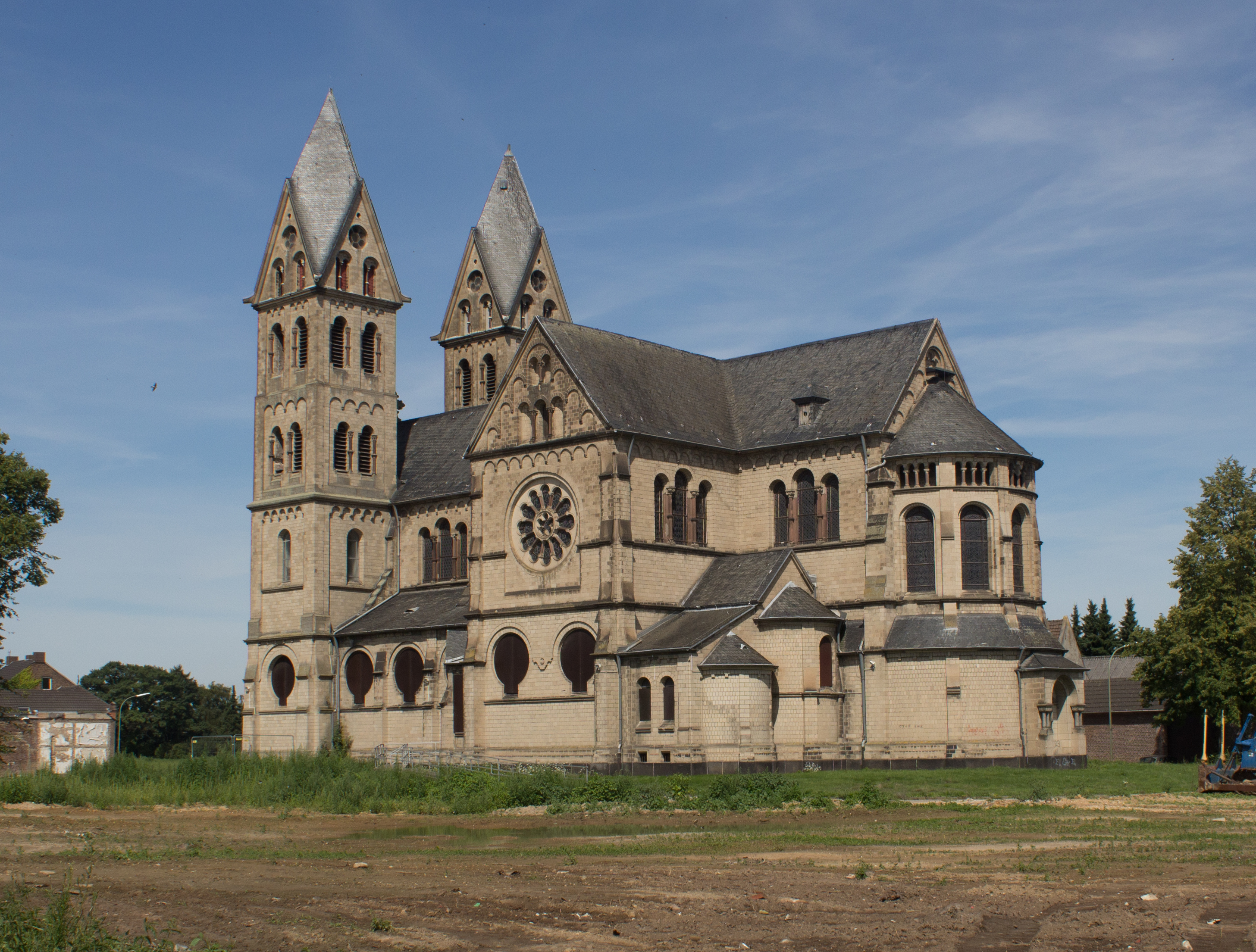
- The church in 2017 before its demolition

- 51°3′4″N 6°26′14″E
- Location: Immerath, Erkelenz, North Rhine-Westphalia
- Country: Germany
- Denomination: Roman Catholic

History
- Status: Parish church
- Founded: c. 12th century or earlier (first church)
- Dedication: Lambert of Maastricht
- Consecrated: 9 July 1891

Architecture
- Functional status: Demolished
- Architect: Erasmus Schüller
- Architectural type: Basilica
- Style: Romanesque Revival
- Years built: 1888–1891
- Closed: 13 October 2013
- Demolished: 9 January 2018

Specifications
- Materials: Bricks and tuff

Administration
- Diocese: Aachen

The Church of St. Lambertus (German: Pfarrkirche St. Lambertus), known locally as the Immerather Dom (meaning "Cathedral of Immerath"), was a Roman Catholic parish church in the village of Immerath, Erkelenz in North Rhine-Westphalia, Germany. A church dedicated to Saint Lambert of Maastricht had existed on the site since at least the 12th century, being rebuilt and enlarged a number of times before being demolished in 1888. It was replaced by Romanesque Revival church building, which was constructed between 1888 and 1891 to designs of Erasmus Schüller.

The church was deconsecrated in 2013, and it was demolished on 9 January 2018, despite being designated a heritage monument. The demolition was part of the destruction of the entire village of Immerath in order to make way for the Garzweiler surface mine. A new smaller church with the same dedication was built as its replacement in Immerath-Neu between 2013 and 2015.

== History ==
=== Previous buildings ===
A church dedicated to Saint Lambert of Maastricht existed on the site in the 12th century, since it is mentioned in the Liber valoris (an ecclesiastical register of the Archdiocese of Cologne). It was a Romanesque building with a single nave and a bell tower on the western side. In around the mid-16th century, the church was rebuilt in the Gothic style, and it had two naves, a choir and a chapel in the northern aisle. A Baroque bell tower was added between 1767 and 1770, and it contained old bells dating back to 1496 and 1512.

=== Construction ===
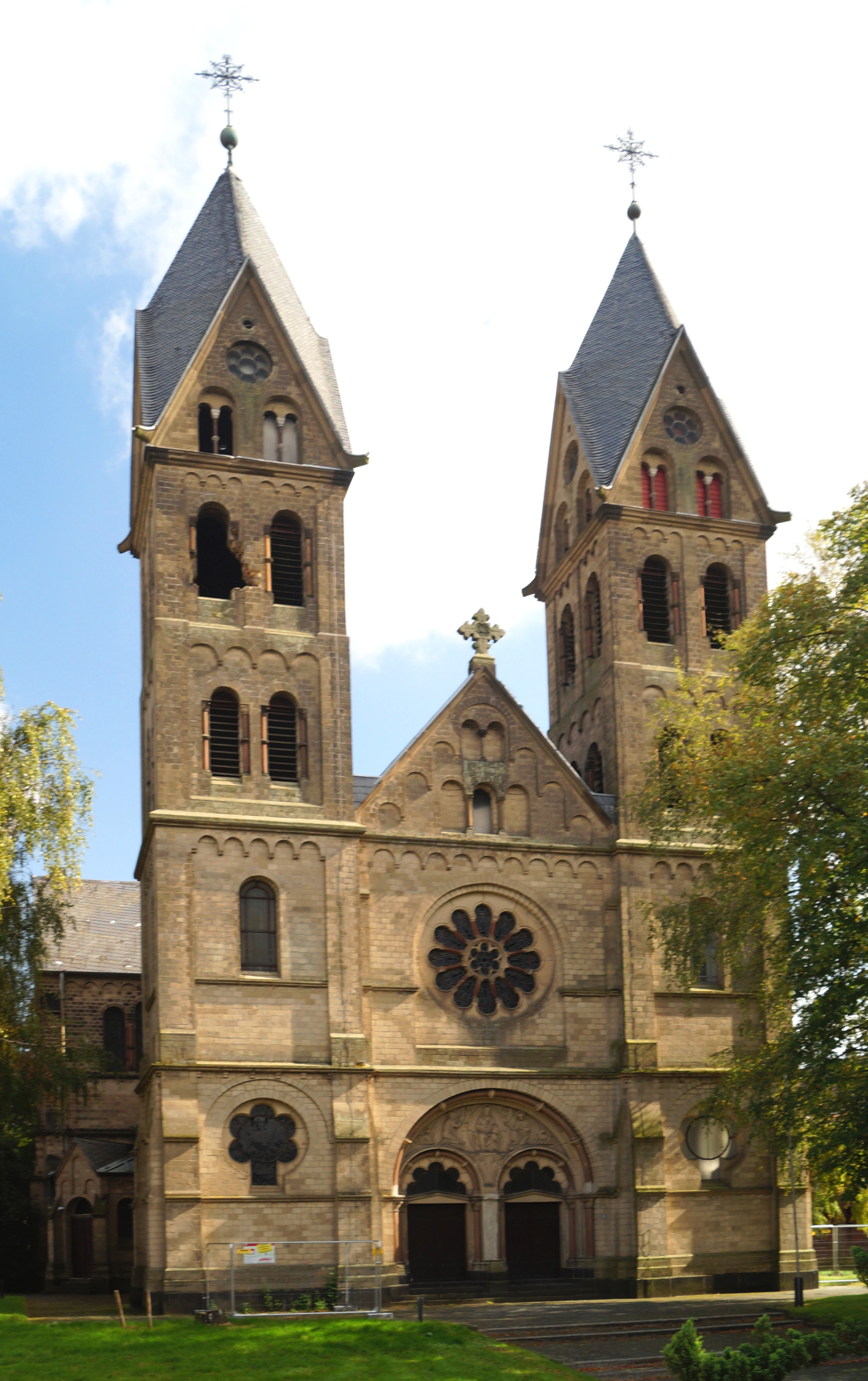
The church's façade in 2014

By the early 19th century, the church had become too small for the needs of the parish, but the expansion was postponed several times due to internal disagreement within the community and other obstacles, while minor works such as the purchase of new altars and an organ were undertaken. From 1886, three proposals for the new church were presented, but they were discarded by the parish community until the designs of the young architect Erasmus Schüller from Cologne were accepted with slight modifications on 12 January 1887. The old church was demolished in April 1888, and the construction of the new one started on 2 September of the same year. Schüller died in 1890 at the age of 29, so the final stages of construction were supervised by the architect Theodor Roß. The church was consecrated by the Archbishop of Cologne on 9 July 1891.

The church was badly damaged by artillery fire in February 1945, during World War II. Repair works began in the following year, and were completed in 1949. The bells had been sent to Hamburg at the beginning of the war, and they were returned to the church in 1947. The church was added to the list of heritage monuments in Erkelenz on 14 May 1985 due to its architectural and symbolic value.

=== Deconsecration and demolition ===
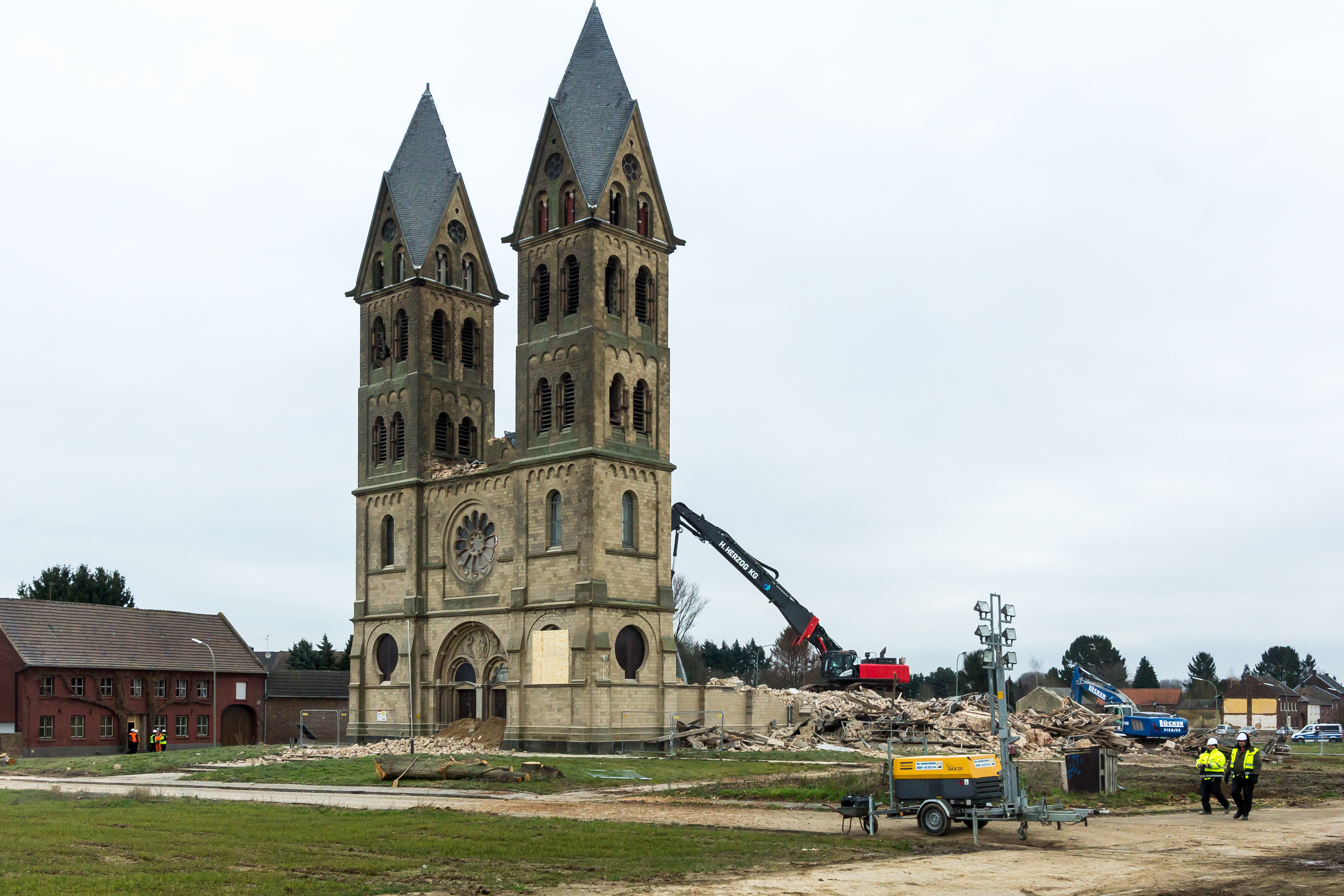
Demolition on 9 January 2018

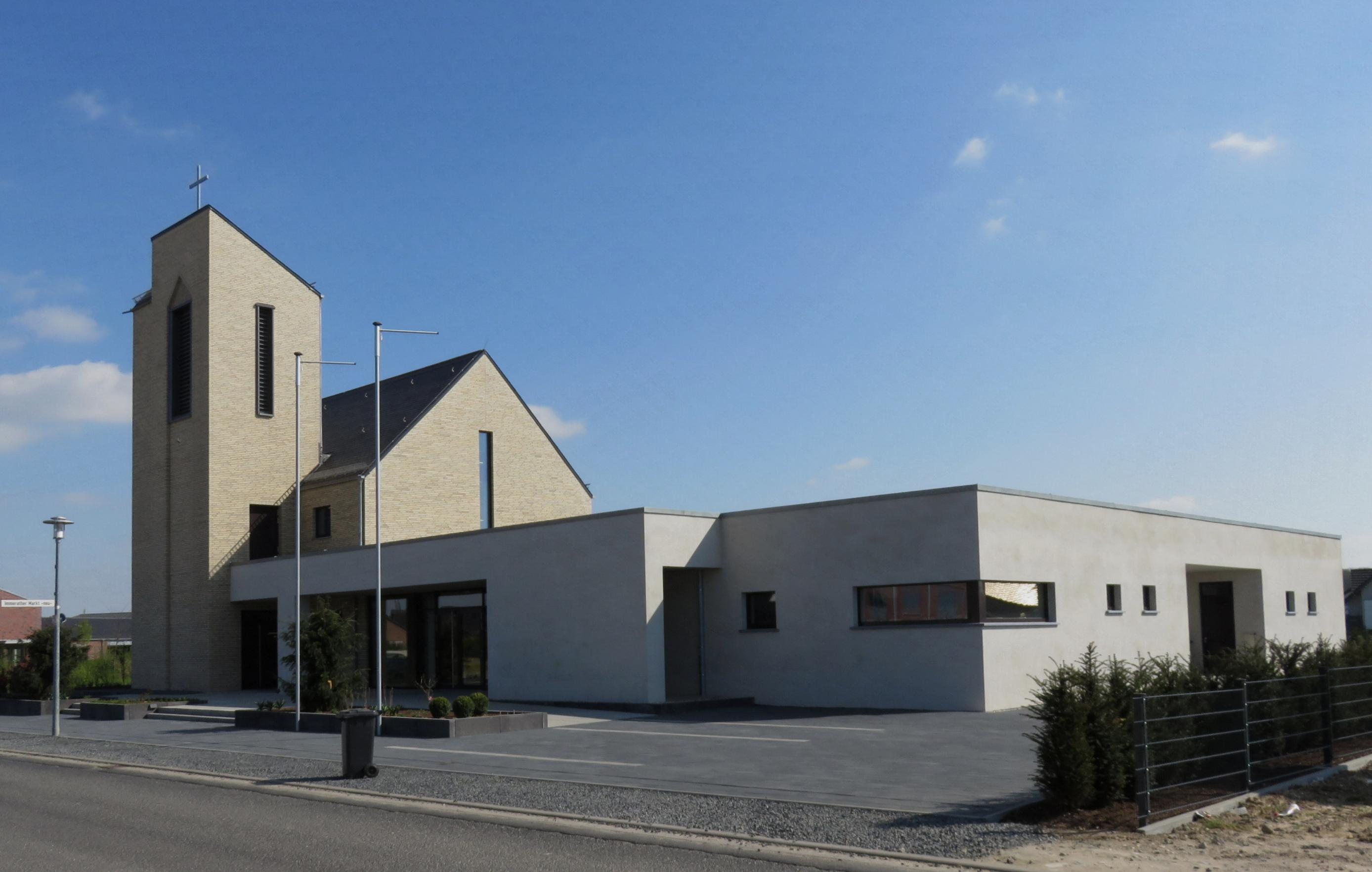
Replacement church in Immerath-Neu

St. Lambertus Videodokumentation Bauwerk und Abriss

The village of Immerath was on the planned route for the extension of the Garzweiler surface mine, a large lignite mine operated by the company RWE. The entire village was therefore demolished in the 2010s, with the company building a new settlement known as Immerath-Neu 11 km (6.8 mi) away as its replacement. The cemetery was also moved, with bodies being exhumed and transferred to the new site.

Maintaining the costs of the church had become too burdensome given the considerable decline of the faithful to fewer than 60 people. The parishioners therefore accepted the company's offer to build a new smaller church in the new town Immerath-Neu. Most of the old church's interior furnishings were purchased by private individuals or by other parishes or religious congregations. The last Mass in the church was celebrated on 13 October 2013, and it was subsequently deconsecrated. The building was demolished on 9 January 2018, amidst protests by Greenpeace activists.

== Architecture ==
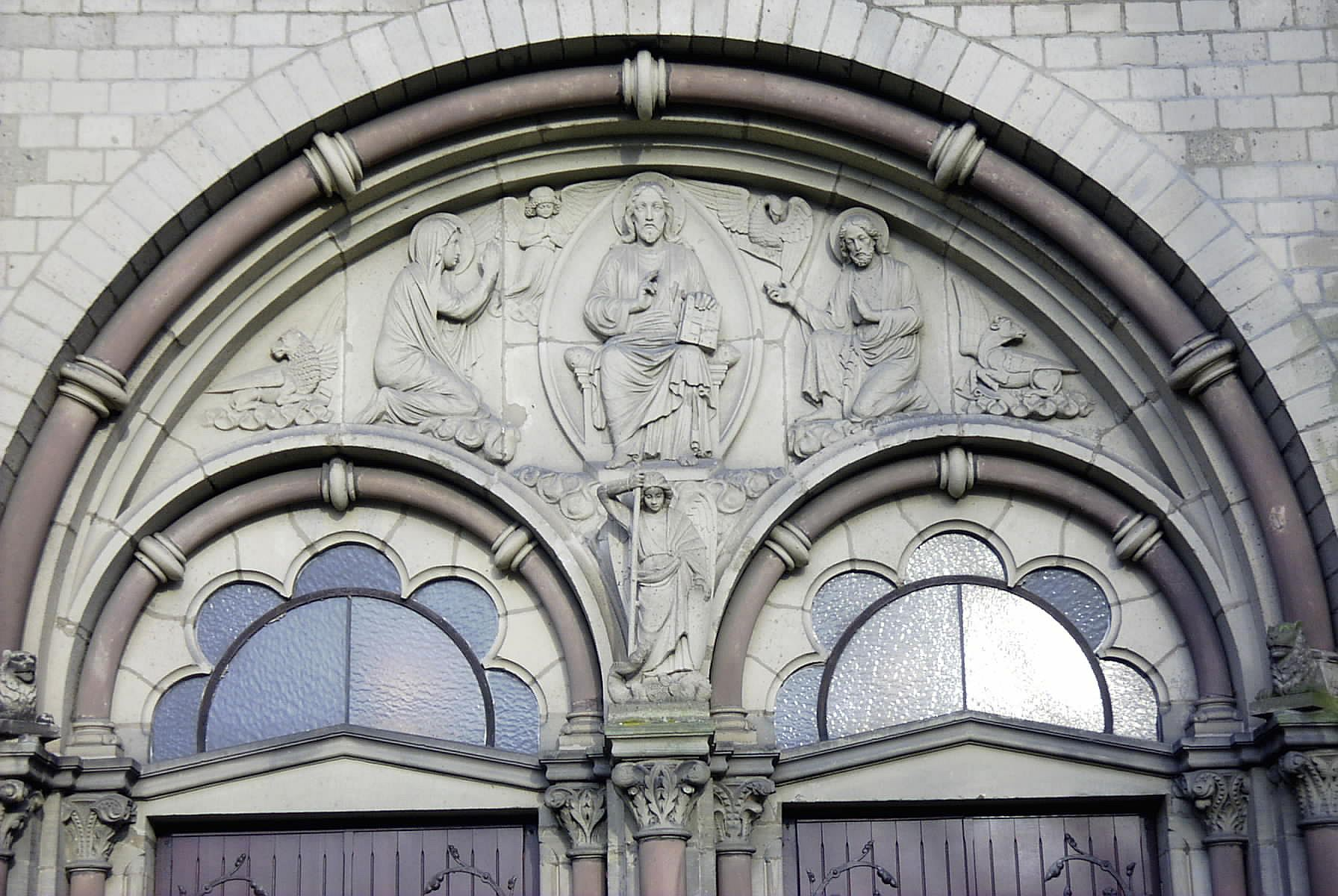
Romanesque relief on the main portal

The Church of St. Lambertus was a basilica built in the Romanesque Revival style, and it was constructed out of bricks decorated with tuff. Its façade had twin bell towers standing at around 40 m (130 ft) high, and it was the only church in the district of Heinsberg having that form. The towers contained two bells which were added in 1955, and the original bells from the old church: the Lambertusglocke dated 1496, and the Marienglocke dated 1512.

It had a double main portal surmounted by a bas-relief depicting Christ Pantocrator. Inside, after the vestibule, there were three naves separated by four pairs of pillars, having a total width of 7 m (23 ft) and a length of about 15 m (49 ft). A gallery hosting the organ was located above the vestibule, and it was accessible through a spiral staircase from the western tower.

The walls and ceiling were plastered in white and they lacked decorations. The plan was based on the church of St. James in Aachen, and the floor had coloured tiles arranged in geometric patterns. The furnishings, parts of which dated back to previous structures, were rather opulent and contrasted with the austere Romanesque style of the building. The highlights included the sculptural group with the crucifix above the choir and the richly decorated high altar covered in gold.

== See also ==
- Church of St. Martin, Borschemich
- Church of Heilig Kreuz, Keyenberg
- Church of St. Simon and Judas Thaddäus, Otzenrath
