= Secure Community Network =

North American Jewish security organization

Secure Community Network (SCN)
- Founded: May 26, 2004; 22 years ago
- Type: 501(c)(3) nonprofit organization
- Tax ID no.: 20-1437733
- Region served: Jewish community in North America
- Chair of the Board of Directors: Wendy Berger
- National Director and CEO: Michael G. Masters
- Revenue: $14,561,389 (2022)
- Expenses: $14,443,278 (2022)
- Employees: 75 (2022)
- Volunteers: 25 (2022)
- Website: www.securecommunitynetwork.org

Secure Community Network (SCN) is a Jewish security organization in North America. It works with hundreds of synagogues to provide safety guidance and threat intelligence. SCN liaises with law enforcement and other organizations to provide best practices for Jewish communal security. SCN is a 501(c)(3) nonprofit organization.

== Description and history ==
The Secure Community Network (SCN), created by the Jewish Federations of North America (JFNA) and the Conference of Presidents of Major American Jewish Organizations in 2004, is the quasi-official umbrella security agency for the American Jewish community. It has the broadest mandate of any organization that specializes in providing security for Jewish facilities. The SCN replaced the Anti-Defamation League (ADL) as the principal clearinghouse for Jewish security issues, though the ADL still trains law enforcement in identifying threats.

The aftermath of the Pittsburgh synagogue shooting in 2018 included arguably the most ambitious and comprehensive effort, led by JFNA, ever taken to protect Jewish life in the United States, according to the New York Times. In addition to bringing in $100 million in federal grants through the Nonprofit Security Grant Program (NGSP), JFNA raised $62 million to secure every Jewish community in North America, overseen by the JFNA's SCN. By 2023, 93 Jewish federations had full-time security directors, a more than four-fold increase over the previous 5 years. SCN's staff grew exponentially, from 5 people in a small office in Chicago to a national organization with 75 employees stationed across the United States.

SCN's analysts, many with backgrounds in the military or private intelligence, monitoring the internet and social media for threats to prominent Jews, synagogues, community centers, and schools. The SCN provides assistance to Jewish communities with hiring security directors, provides best practice materials, and gives security advice as needed.

SCN is the Jewish community's primary point of contact with the federal government for homeland security issues, sets national standards, and assists small Jewish communities that lack capacity and resources. Major metropolitan areas with their own resources such as New York City, Los Angeles, Cleveland, Detroit, and Boston formed independent security initiatives like the New York-based Community Security Initiative (CSI) that report directly to the local Jewish federation and partner with SCN.

== Structure ==
Through its operations center and Duty Desk, SCN provides timely, credible threat and incident information to law enforcement and community partners, serves as the community's formal liaison with federal law enforcement, and coordinates closely with state and local law enforcement partners. SCN works with communities and partners across North America to develop and implement strategic frameworks that enhance the safety and security of the Jewish people, developing best practice policies and procedures, undertaking threat and vulnerability assessments, coordinating training and education, offering consultation on safety and security matters, and providing crisis management support during critical incidents.

=== Leadership ===
Michael G. Masters took over as National Director and CEO of SCN, a position the Jewish Telegraphic Agency calls the "Jewish community's anti-terrorism czar", in December 2017. Masters replaced Paul Goldenberg, SCN's founder. In this role, Masters is an employee of JFNA and works out of the organization's New York office.

== Activities ==
SCN works to help the various synagogues of the United States to work with FBI, state, and local law enforcement partners. SCN also engages with local synagogues and works to enhance security on a variety of levels with synagogues from around the country.

=== Command Center/JSOCC ===
In September 2021, SCN unveiled a command center in Chicago to safeguard Jewish communities across the United States dubbed the National Jewish Security Operations Command Center (JSOCC). JSOCC centralizes intelligence analysis and security operations across Jewish organizations, enabling SCN to proactively track threats and coordinate responses with local, state, and federal law enforcement agencies. Funded by private donors, the JSOCC features a 16-foot video wall for real-time threat monitoring, individual workstations for analysts, and the capacity to seat eight personnel, with overflow space to accommodate additional staff during major incidents. The command center operates 16 hours daily, with the potential to expand to 24/7.

In December 2022, SCN National Director and CEO Michael Masters said "Fundamentally what we're trying to do is create a proactive security shield over the entirety of the Jewish community in North America ... The thing about a shield is any chink in that shield is a weakness. So, it needs to be as comprehensive, complex, and formidable in our largest cities as in our most rural communities."

Based in SCN's JSOCC, the organization's Duty Desk leverages Project RAIN (Realtime Actionable Intelligence Network), a proprietary technology platform that identifies and tracks threats to more than 12,400 Jewish facilities across North America. SCN is the only faith-based entity with a direct link to the FBI's National Threat Operations Center (NTOC), a testament to the high quality of the threat tracking provided by their field staff and Duty Desk analysts. Through Project RAIN SCN continuously monitors information from over 1,000 sources, including news, weather, social media, law enforcement, and the deep/dark web to gather intelligence and create situational awareness assessments and alerts relative to these Jewish locations.

SCN is connected to approximately 90% of the Jewish-American community via its deployment of the Everbridge Critical Event Management (CEM) platform. Numerous threat intelligence feeds are monitored within the CEM platform, which leverages Visual Command Center (VCC) to view the Everbridge Risk Intelligence Monitoring Center (RIMC) feed. The JSOCC and the Duty Desk leveraged the Everbridge CEM platform during the hostage situation in Colleyville, Texas. Everbridge provided important situational awareness during the critical event and equipped SCN with the tools to issue an eventual "all clear" to its members nationally.

=== Nonprofit Security Grant Program (NSGP) ===
SCN offers a range of resources and support services to help Jewish organizations and communities apply for and secure funding through the federal Nonprofit Security Grant Program (NSGP). NSGP grants provide critical funding for security improvements at synagogues, community centers, schools, campus facilities, and other Jewish centers of life across the United States.

To assist in the communities' utilization of this federal program, SCN provides facility assessments, offers consultations on physical security solutions and strategies, conducts webinars, and facilitates grant review and guidance support. Eligible NSGP expenses include equipment such as cameras, locks, and alarm systems; training for staff and community members; and security personnel. In 2023, SCN security professionals conducted 790 comprehensive facility security assessments and informal walkthroughs, enabling hundreds of Jewish organizations to upgrade security measures and obtain over $27.4 million in federal grants.

SCN's NSGP expertise and training programs were acknowledged as instrumentally life-saving during a July 2023 incident at the Margolin Hebrew Academy in which a gunman unsuccessfully attempted to enter the school premises. Both the school and authorities recognized SCN for preparing the school staff with active shooter training and for helping procure the necessary security equipment through NSGP funds, which prevented the would-be shooter's entry into the school building.

SCN secures more NSGP funds for faith-based institutions than any organization in the United States. Communities with SCN-managed programs have realized a 140% increase in their federal funding since SCN involvement. The organizations that SCN has assisted have expanded their NSGP funding from $20.9 million in 2022 to $27.4 million in 2023, while SCN's entire annual operating budget in 2022 was $20.9 million, meaning that for every $1 SCN receives from donors, it delivers $1.43 back to the communities it serves based on this program alone.

=== Camp security and preparedness ===
An initiative was launched in 2020 in partnership between SCN and the Foundation for Jewish Camp (FJC) with the support of UJA-Federation of New York to provide facility assessments and security training for Jewish camps, many of which are located in rural and open areas. In 2022, SCN delivered training for 2,885 staff members at 38 camps, representing 15,000 campers, counselors, and staff. SCN also partnered with the Union for Reform Judaism (URJ) to provide enhanced security training and consulting services for all 15 URJ summer camps in North America. SCN's Jewish Camp Security Program now formally includes nearly 75 camps.

=== Standardized Incident Reporting Form ===
In 2022, SCN partnered with more than 30 Jewish Federations to launch the first nationally standardized incident reporting effort that ties together local security initiatives and SCN as a national partner. The public can use the standardized form on each Federation website to report threats, incidents, and suspicious activity. Reports are sent immediately to local Federation security professionals and the Duty Desk, where they are analyzed and any necessary action is taken to protect the community.

==== National and international reporting partnerships ====
SCN has emphasized establishing official coordination channels between major Jewish denominations and community advocacy groups to better streamline incident reporting and security preparedness. In 2021, SCN launched ReportCampusHate.org in partnership with Hillel International and the Anti-Defamation League to field incident reports related to colleges and universities.

In January 2024, SCN and the United Synagogue of Conservative Judaism announced a formal Memorandum of Agreement designating SCN as their official collaborator in safety and security matters. This agreement builds upon SCN's existing partnerships with other major Jewish denominations, including a memorandum of understanding signed with the Union for Reform Judaism in late 2022 and the roll-out of an incident reporting forum with the Orthodox Union.

== Involvement in major events ==
=== Pittsburgh synagogue shooting and trial ===
On October 27, 2018, Robert Bowers stormed a Pittsburgh Synagogue complex in the Squirrel Hill neighborhood where he killed 11 worshipers and injured several others. The event was the deadliest attack on the Jewish community in U.S. history and served as an inflection point for Jewish communal security in North America. SCN Senior National Security Advisor Brad Orsini, who led Pittsburgh's Federation security at the time of the attack, credited Rabbi Jeffrey Myers' (the spiritual leader of Tree of Life) decision to bring his phone to the synagogue as a reason for saving many lives, as it enabled him to be the first person to alert emergency services.

During the highly publicized 2023 federal trial in which Bowers faced a potential death penalty sentence, SCN and the Jewish Federation of Greater Pittsburgh pitched a local command post where they jointly monitored various channels for activities that might endanger the Pittsburgh community. Of particular interest was the physical security of testifying witnesses and any online chatter that might have indicated potential security risks to key persons of interest.

Bowers was convicted on 63 federal charges on June 16, 2023, and the jury unanimously recommended the death penalty on August 2, 2023. Following the sentencing, SCN national director and CEO Michael Masters commented, "This sentence sends a message to violent extremists, terrorists, and antisemites everywhere that the United States will not tolerate hate and violence against the Jewish people, nor any people of faith ... In the years since that dreadful day in 2018, our community has shown extraordinary resilience and determination, both in the spirit of demonstrating our strength in response to the heinous attack and working to increase our security to prepare for and prevent future acts of targeted violence."

On August 10, 2023, Hardy Lloyd, a convicted felon with a history of white supremacist ideology, was arrested on charges of making interstate threats, attempting to obstruct justice, and witness intimidation specifically targeting participants in the Pittsburgh Synagogue Shooting trial. This followed a months-long campaign of harassment and threats directed at the Jewish community, including the Jewish Federation of Greater Pittsburgh and SCN. SCN and the Jewish Federation of Greater Pittsburgh worked closely with law enforcement, including the FBI, to monitor and share information about Hardy Lloyd's activities, which eventually led to a tip-off resulting in his arrest. Ultimately, Lloyd pleaded guilty and admitted that "he intentionally selected the jury and government witnesses in the Bowers trial as the targets of his offense due to the actual or perceived Jewish religion" of the witnesses and victims. He was sentenced to 6.5 years in federal prison on December 20, 2023.

=== 2019 Monsey Hannukah Stabbing ===
On December 28, 2019, which was the seventh night of Hannukah, Grafton E. Thomas wielded a large knife and attacked Jewish congregants at a synagogue in Monsey, New York. Within moments, and before any news outlet covered the incident, through Project RAIN, SCN was notified of the event given the proximity to several other synagogues within the RAIN mapping network. SCN informed its network of security directors and affected community leadership, allowing nearby Jewish organizations to enter into swift lockdown protocols. Three months after the stabbing, the most severely injured stabbing victim, Rabbi Josef Neumann, aged 72, died of his wounds.

=== 2022 Colleyville Synagogue Hostage Crisis ===
On January 15, 2022, Malik Akram, a 44-year-old British Pakistani armed with a pistol, took four people hostage in the Congregation Beth Israel synagogue in Colleyville, Texas, United States, during a Sabbath service. Hostage negotiations ensued, during which Akram demanded the release of Aafia Siddiqui, a Pakistani national and alleged al-Qaeda operative imprisoned in nearby Fort Worth for attempted murder and other crimes. He released one hostage after six hours, and the remaining three hostages escaped eleven hours into the standoff. Tactical officers from the FBI Hostage Rescue Team subsequently entered the synagogue and fatally shot Akram.

Within minutes of the attack, SCN Duty Desk intelligence analysts located the terrorist's livestream on social media and alerted the local Federation security director, who deployed to the incident. SCN then activated its Incident Management Team, notified the U.S. Department of Homeland Security and the FBI leadership of the unfolding crisis, and initiated contact with the FBI Field Office in Dallas. Throughout the day, SCN worked with its network of security directors; local, state, and federal law enforcement; and key international partners and counterterrorism colleagues until the crisis ended. SCN then released a community-wide alert via its national mass notification system, instantaneously notifying over 12,000 people of the event's outcome.

In May and August leading up to the January incident, SCN ran a training program for the Ft. Worth area to enhance community-wide safety and security in the region. Rabbi Charlie Cytron-Walker, the rabbi of Congregation Beth Israel in Colleyville at the time of the hostage crisis, credited this SCN training with saving lives during the ordeal. Recalling a key moment from the training, he recognized an opportunity when the gunman's focus shifted, he then yelled at his congregants to run, grabbed a chair, and threw it at the attacker. This swift action provided the crucial distraction that allowed the hostages to escape to safety. Jeffrey Cohen, vice president of the synagogue's board of trustees, was present during the crisis and later stated, "We weren't released or freed ... we escaped because we had training from the Secure Community Network on what to do in the event of an active shooter."

=== 2023 Gaza War ===
Soon after the start of the Gaza war SCN was called on by media outlets to issue a statement, SCN responded in October 2023 saying, "At this time, there are no known credible threats to the US Jewish community."

In the immediate aftermath of the October 7 Hamas attacks on Israel, SCN provided security and safety guidance to community partners and law enforcement based on real-time intelligence and threat assessments. Compared to 2022, the SCN Duty Desk saw a 112% increase in tracked security incidents, logging a yearly record of 5,404 incidents impacting Jewish communities. Global events, particularly the October 7 Hamas attacks on Israel, contributed to shaping this elevated security and risk landscape. In the three months since the terror attack, SCN logged an unprecedented 2,628 incidents, which included cases of death threats, vandalism, assault, harassment, manslaughter, and terroristic threats.

In the beginning days of the war, the group arranged for a widely publicized conference call between FBI Director Christopher A. Wray and leaders of the Jewish community following a suggested international day of rage by Hamas figures. The director said on the October 12 call with approximately 4,000 participants that the bureau was "also aware of information on the internet about a Hamas call for action or demonstrations... [and] we cannot and do not discount the possibility that Hamas, or other foreign terrorist organizations, could exploit the conflict to call on their supporters to conduct attacks here on our own soil."

SCN National Director and CEO Michael Masters reflected on the nature of the threat environment in an October 13 interview with the Associated Press in which he warned against letting "fear or clickbait threats cause chaos" in Jewish communities because he said that is part of the objective of those spreading hateful rhetoric online. In a profile interview with ABC News that aired October 19, Bradley Orsini, SCN's senior national security advisor, disclosed that since the Israel-Hamas war "the number of threats [targeting Jewish communities] in the US has tripled from about 20 a day to about 60 a day."

According to SCN data cited in an interview with CNN's Dana Bash that aired November 18, the organization logged a then monthly record of 770 antisemitic incident reports in the immediate month following the Hamas attack—the most ever internally recorded since the group's founding in 2004. A December 17 article appearing in The Jerusalem Post reported that in November SCN tracked 634 incidents—up 290% from the year prior—that included vandalism, harassment, and assault, among other acute threats and actions.

In addition to recording incidents, SCN worked in close partnership with local, state, and federal law enforcement, including the FBI, to refer individuals committing acts of antisemitic hate and violence to authorities. In October and November 2023 (the first two months of the war), SCN referred 230 individuals to law enforcement. In December 2023, SCN referred a record 779 individuals to law enforcement, representing a significant 48% of the total referrals for 2023 (1,619). This figure marks a sharp rise in referrals compared to previous years: 578 in 2022, 117 in 2021, and 232 in 2020.

Following an influx of reported threats and hostile activities targeting Jewish students at U.S. universities, Masters joined Fox News's Harris Faulkner to discuss growing safety concerns on college campuses. The interview came in the backdrop of an October incident in which a junior at Cornell University, posted death threats targeting Jewish students on an online messaging board. In the interview, Masters pointed to the parallels in language used by the student in his threats and the war crimes committed by Hamas such as using rape as a weapon of war and the indiscriminate targeting of Jews for perceived war crimes in Gaza. Between October and December 2023, SCN recorded 320 antisemitic incidents on college campuses, which included cases of assault, vandalism, and death threats.

On December 6, 2023, the United States Department of Homeland Security released new resources to support faith-based communities in enhancing their physical security. The initiative came in response to a "current heightened threat environment," partially driven by ongoing conflicts in the Middle East, including the Israel-Hamas war, which makes houses of worship "vulnerable as potential targets for malicious actors."

SCN worked with DHS in developing and disseminating these performance goals tailored for nonprofits. Masters, who also sits on the DHS Faith-Based Security Advisory Council, emphasized the importance of this initiative in an official DHS press release, stating: "The Secure Community Network is proud to partner with the Department of Homeland Security to ensure the highest quality guidance for faith-based communities amidst a time of increased threat of hate and violence ... DHS guidance continues to set a high standard and example that our community is proud to follow, and we look forward to the work of our continued partnership."

=== 2023 surge in bomb threats and swatting incidents against Jewish institutions ===
SCN noted a significant rise in bomb threats and swatting calls targeting Jewish institutions in the United States during December 2023. According to SCN, over 200 such incidents occurred between December 15 and 16. The threats and calls targeted Jewish institutions across various states, including California, Arizona, Connecticut, Colorado, Washington, and others. Nearly 800 (65%) of the month's 1,222 incidents were tied to these false bomb threats and swatting incidents. In total, SCN recorded 1,005 swatting incidents and false bomb threats in 2023, an 873% increase from 2022, when SCN recorded a total of 115 incidents.

In a press release following the surge, SCN National Director and CEO Michael Masters stated, "It's critical to recognize that these are not victimless crimes or innocent pranks: They can have real—and even deadly—consequences. We appreciate the arrests made to date, recognizing that the often sophisticated and anonymous nature of this activity makes these threats difficult to mitigate."

While none of the incidents caused physical injury to the Jewish community, according to an FBI memo obtained by ABC News the disruption campaigns appeared to be connected "based on similar language and specific email tradecraft used [and] these threats appear[ed] to be originating from outside of the United States." In an interview with NewsNation on the matter, Bradley Orsini, SCN's senior national security advisor, stated, "We will take every one of these bomb threats, every one of these swatting incidents seriously, but we still need to maintain our ability to be open, welcoming and to continue to function as a Jewish community."

== See also ==
- Community Security Trust, Jewish community security organization in the United Kingdom
