= Nonprofit Security Grant Program =

Funding program in the United States

The Nonprofit Security Grant Program (NSGP), previously the Urban Areas Security Initiative Nonprofit Security Grant Program (UASI NSGP), is a grant program administered by the United States Department of Homeland Security (DHS) that provides funding for target hardening and physical security enhancements to non-profit organizations at high risk of terrorist attack.

== Description ==
The Nonprofit Security Grant Program (NSGP) is a grant program administered by FEMA under the United States Department of Homeland Security (DHS) that provides funding for target hardening and physical security enhancements to non-profit organizations at high risk of terrorist attack. The NSGP is one of eight DHS grant programs that assists states and localities prepare for terrorist attacks. The NSGP is funded through two subgrants: the State Homeland Security Grant Program (SHSGP), allocated to non-profit organizations, and the Urban Area Security Initiative (UASI), allocated specifically to non-profit organizations within high-risk and high-threat cities.

To qualify for funding, organizations pass through review boards at the state level, then undergo a review at the national level that determines the actual amount of aid. Groups use the funding for measures such as blast-proof windows, reinforced doors, locks, gates, video surveillance, security training, awareness campaigns, and response planning.

== History ==
Since 1996, the U.S. Congress has provided grant funding to states and localities to prepare for terrorist attacks and improve domestic security. The idea for the NSGP was first proposed by the Jewish Federations of North America (JFNA) on December 11, 2001. The NSGP was created by legislation enacted in 2004, and the program distributed its first grants in 2005 as a security initiative under the umbrella of the two-year-old Urban Areas Security Initiative. In its first year, Congress funded the program at slightly less than $25 million annually.

Legislators and advocacy groups such as mainstream American Jewish organizations have called for an increase in funding, such as to cover all eligible applicants, especially after terror plots such as the 2009 Bronx terrorism plot, the Colleyville synagogue hostage crisis, the 2023 Hamas attack on Israel, and the 2025 Capital Jewish Museum shooting.

Funding increased significantly in the 2020s to meet increasing demand as antisemitism increased in the United States. Despite funding increases, the program fulfilled just over half of total grant applications, with total grant requests reaching $447 million. Since 2019, legislators and groups such as the Orthodox Union and Jewish Federations of North America called for $360 million in annual funding. The New Lines Institute also recommended funding the program at this level in a 2022 analysis.

Amid a surge of antisemitism during the Gaza war, U.S. Senate Majority Leader Chuck Schumer called for the program's annual funding to be tripled to $1 billion for 2024. The funding would increase staff at FEMA to accelerate the rate at which grants were administered and to satisfy the 58% of applications, representing $679 million in funding, that were not approved.

In 2024, DHS allocated $454.5 million to organizations under NSGP, the largest ever allocated toward the program, and an increase of $150 million over 2023. This amount fulfilled 43% of the 7,584 total applications representing $973 million in total funding requests. Thirty-seven percent of grant recipients were Jewish institutions.

| Fiscal Year | Amount Allocated ($M) | References |
|---|---|---|
| 2005 | 25 | |
| 2006 | 0 | |
| 2007 | 24 | |
| 2008 | 15 | |
| 2009 | 15 | |
| 2010 | 19 | |
| 2011 | 19 | |
| 2012 | 10 | |
| 2014 | 13 | |
| 2017 | 25 | |
| 2018 | 60 | |
| 2019 | 60 | |
| 2020 | 90 | |
| 2021 | 180 | |
| 2022 | 250 | |
| 2023 | 305 | |
| 2024 | 454.5 | |
| 2025 | 274 | |

=== Recipients ===
Between 2011 and 2021, faith-based awardees received approximately 97% of all NSGP funds, and secular awardees have received approximately 3% of all funds. Secular awardees include medical institutions and higher education institutions.

Jewish groups and institutions have received most of the program's funding since its establishment in 2005 due to higher levels of Jewish participation in applications and because they were deemed at higher risk of potential terrorist attack based on threat and risk information, according to DHS information and the New Lines Institute. Jewish institutions received 60% of funding in 2009, 73% between 2007 and 2010, 81% in 2011, 97% in 2012, and almost 90% in 2013. By 2014, $110 million of the $138 million distributed through the program had gone to Jewish institutions seeking funding.

In an attempt to broaden access to the program, Jewish Federations of North America (JFNA) have held trainings to help other faith groups improve their grant applications, including hosting a joint webinar with the U.S. Council of Muslim Organizations (USCMO). JFNA and the Orthodox Union joined with the USCMO, the Sikh Council for Interfaith Relations, and several Christian denominations to call for increased funding to the program. The joint lobbying effort resulted in Congress appropriating twice the previous year's funding for 2021.

After the Colleyville synagogue hostage crisis in 2022, Rabbi Charlie Cytron-Walker credited NSGP for boosting his synagogue's security measures, such as upgrading its camera system.

The program has become a popular topic among antisemitic and conspiracy-oriented bloggers, who point to information on award sizes to argue that Jewish interests have undue effect upon the American government.

== State-level programs ==
Several U.S. states have their own nonprofit security grant programs, including California, Connecticut, New Jersey, Maryland, Ohio, Florida, Illinois, Pennsylvania, New York, and Massachusetts.

=== California ===
After the Poway synagogue shooting, the California State Legislature passed AB 1548 to establish the California State Nonprofit Security Grant Program in 2019, awarding up to $200,000 per year to religious, political, and mission-based institutions. The state allocated $12 million to the program, administered by the California Governor's Office of Emergency Services, in 2019. Security grants had previously been a line item in the state budget since 2015.

=== Connecticut ===
In February 2021, Governor Ned Lamont announced $3.8 million in grants for 97 nonprofits, with a maximum of $50,000 per site, as part of the state's newly established Nonprofit Security Grant Program. In 2024, the program announced up to $5 million in annual grants.

=== Florida ===
Citing tensions due to the Gaza war, Governor Ron DeSantis signed HB 7-C in November 2023 to allocate $25 million in Security Grants to Jewish days schools and pre-schools. An additional $20 million will be given to the Florida Division of Emergency Management to establish a nonprofit security grant program for organizations at high risk of violent attacks or hate crimes.

=== New York ===
Since 2021, New York has awarded $131.5 million in security grants to non-profits, religious groups, and community organizations. In 2025, the state planned to direct $63.9 million in state funding to 636 organizations, in addition to $44.8 million in federal funding under the NSGP.

=== Pennsylvania ===
After the Pittsburgh synagogue shooting in 2018, Pennsylvania passed Act 83 of 2019 to establish the state's Nonprofit Security Grant Fund. Initially, $5 million in grant funding was available. After an increase in antisemitism during the Israel-Gaza war in 2023, the state legislature increased the available funding to $10 million. In the 5 years since its inception, the fund distributed $25 million to synagogues, mosques, and other nonprofit organizations.

== Outside the United States ==
=== United Kingdom ===
Since 2015, the United Kingdom has allocated £122 million through the Jewish Community Protective Security Grant to enhance security efforts such as security guards, CCTV, and alarm systems, at Jewish schools and synagogues, including £15 million in funding for 2023–24.

The UK government also allocated £24.5 million in 2022 for the Places of Worship Protective Security Funding Scheme for mosques and associated faith community centers.

== See also ==
- Secure Community Network, Jewish security organization in North America
- List of attacks on Jewish institutions
