= Michael G. Masters =

American lawyer and global security consultant

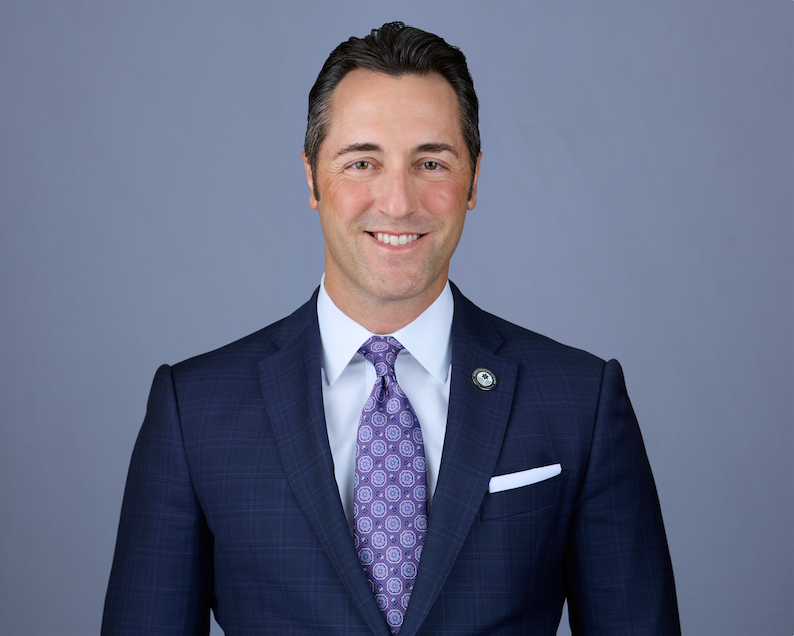
- Education: University of Michigan (B.A., History); University of Cambridge (MPhil, International Relations); Harvard Law School (Juris Doctor)
- Title: National Director and CEO of the Secure Community Network

Michael G. Masters is the national director and chief executive officer of the Secure Community Network. He previously served as senior vice president of The Soufan Group and executive director of the Department of Homeland Security and Emergency Management for Cook County, Illinois. He also serves on the secretary of the Department of Homeland Security’s Faith Based Security and Communications Advisory Committee, as the vice-chair of the secretary’s Homeland Security Advisory Council’s Grants Review Task Force and on the secretary’s Homeland Security Advisory Council’s Foreign Fighter Task Force.

== Early life and education ==
Masters was born on November 14, 1978, in Chicago, Illinois. A Truman and a Gates Cambridge Trust Scholar, Masters received his Bachelor of Arts in History from the University of Michigan, and a Master of Philosophy degree in International Relations from the University of Cambridge in the United Kingdom. He received his Juris Doctor degree from Harvard Law School where he was managing editor of the Harvard International Law Journal.

Masters holds the rank of captain in the United States Marine Corps.

== Career ==
=== Early career ===
He served as an assistant to Chicago Mayor Richard M. Daley for public safety during which time he oversaw public safety policy and operations for the City of Chicago and as a liaison to the Chicago Police and Fire Departments and the Chicago Office of Emergency Management and Communications.

He then served as the Chief of Staff of the Chicago Police Department, during which time he oversaw enhancements to training and equipment and the implementation of performance management metrics and accountability systems.

He has also worked with the Washington D.C.–based Partnership for Public Service, a nonpartisan, organization dedicated to revitalizing the federal civil service, and with the United States Attorney’s office, also in Washington, D.C. He has engaged in development work on the Pine Ridge Indian Reservation in South Dakota. During the 2000 presidential election cycle, Masters was a member of United States Vice President Al Gore’s national advance team.

=== Cook County Department of Homeland Security and Emergency Management ===
As Executive Director of the Department of Homeland Security and Emergency Management for Cook County, Illinois, Masters was responsible for coordinating and maintaining the homeland security and emergency management system across Cook County, involving both first responder and public sector agencies as well as partners in the private, nonprofit and academic sectors.

During his tenure, the department implemented a federally grant funded training and exercise programs, reaching over 9200 first responders annually. The department also created the Cook County Incident Command Center (CCICC), complete with a 24/7 Duty Desk that gathers and disseminates information, compiles daily situation reports and sends situation awareness updates on a daily basis on everything ranging from international terrorism events to weather updates.

An Emergency Operations Center was established, and investment made in water pumps, generators, light towers and other mobile infrastructure, all of which was made available for deployment across the County and in support of local jurisdictions and other stakeholders in the case of a disaster.

=== The Soufan Group ===
Masters served as the Senior Vice President of The Soufan Group, a strategic advisory firm that assists organizations in the public and private sectors with addressing emergent threats. He currently holds an Of Counsel role with The Soufan Group and Soufan Strategies and as of July 2021 serves as the President of the Soufan Center.

=== Secure Community Network ===
In December 2017, Masters became National Director and CEO of the Secure Community Network (SCN), the national homeland security initiative of the North American Jewish community, formed under the Jewish Federations of North America and Conference of Presidents of Major American Jewish Organizations. Prior to his role as National Director, Masters served as a Senior Advisor to SCN.
