= Community Security Trust =

British charity

- Chief Executive: Mark Gardner
- Website: cst.org.uk

The Community Security Trust (CST) is a British charity whose stated mission is to provide safety, security, and advice to the Jewish community in the UK. It provides advice, training, representation and security services, and undertakes research in this field.

== Founding and mission ==
The Community Security Trust grew out of the Community Security Organisation, which became independent of the Board of Deputies of British Jews in 1986. It was registered as a charity in 1994 and has a mission to provide safety, security, and advice to the Jewish community in the UK. The CST's mission statement says, "To work at all times for the physical protection of British Jews." The CST began recording antisemitic incidents in 1984.

== Structure ==
The group's founding chairman is the British businessman and supporter of Jewish charities, Gerald Ronson.

The deputy chairman is Lloyd Dorfman. The chief executive of the CST is Mark Gardner, who was previously the Director of Communications. Dave Rich is the Director of Policy at CST.

The CST has four offices, over 90 employees and a network of several thousand volunteers from all parts of the Jewish community, who work closely with the police, including for joint patrols, advisory, and training.

== Activities ==
The CST provides security advice and training for Jewish schools, synagogues and communal organisations and gives assistance to those bodies that are affected by antisemitism. The CST also assists and supports individual members of the Jewish community who have been affected by antisemitism and antisemitic incidents. Included in its activity is monitoring criticism of Israel.

It advises and represents the Jewish community on matters of antisemitism, terrorism and security and works with police, government and international bodies. All this work is provided at no charge.

In 2012, the CST provided the model for a new anti-Islamophobia project, Tell MAMA (run by interfaith organisation Faith Matters), with which it now works closely.

=== Research ===
The CST has recorded antisemitic incidents in the UK since 1984 and publishes an annual Antisemitic Incidents Report. The organisation does not release details of its methodology.

The CST's work countering antisemitism includes Anti-Zionism which it views as a euphemism for "Jewishness" and "Jew". In its most recent report on antisemitism 43% of recorded incidents involved Anti-Zionism. In the same report the CST recorded 355 instances where they claimed "the phrase 'Free Palestine' was used for antisemitic purposes."^{Misleading}

The CST also published Terrorist Incidents against Jewish Communities and Israeli Citizens Abroad 1968–2010, a definitive report of terrorist attacks against Jewish communities around the world.

In 2003, the charity worked with the Board of Deputies of British Jews to submit a report concerning Iran and antisemitism to the Foreign Affairs Select Committee.

In 2020, the charity released a report on rising antisemitic incidents in universities named Campus Antisemitism in Britain 2018–2020. It provided advice to universities on how to respond to reports of antisemitism. The report was debated in the House of Lords in January 2021.

In 2023, the CST recorded 4,103 antisemitic incidents in the United Kingdom, the highest reported in a calendar year, and an increase of 147% compared to 2022. The figures spiked after the 2023 Hamas-led attack on Israel. In the first half of 2024, 1,978 antisemitic incidents were reported.

=== Online abuse ===
The CST has been active in monitoring and attempting to combat extremist activity online.

In 2019, the CST recorded 1,805 incidents of antisemitic abuse, 697 of which were online. The group claimed it was likely that Gaza-Israel tensions and turmoil within the UK's Labour Party contributed in part to an increase in such incidents.

During the COVID-19 pandemic, the CST reported in 2020 that it had recorded a drop in physical assaults on Jewish people in the UK, but had noted an increase in online abuse, including antisemitic conspiracy theories accusing Jewish people of engineering the pandemic as a "hoax" or spreading COVID-19, among other antisemitic content. The charity had also said that it noticed far-right commentators online discussing spreading COVID-19 to synagogues.

The CST has released reports detailing content it considers harmful on certain alt-tech platforms such as Parler, BitChute, and Gab. The CST stated that the website BitChute was hosting videos from National Action, a neo-Nazi terrorist group in the UK. The Guardian reported that CST's analysis discovered posts on Telegram which "celebrat[ed] Thomas Mair and David Copeland, and other far-right terrorists." In early 2021, the CST reported the website BitChute to Ofcom for content it considered antisemitic, hateful, and extremist. The CST has scrutinized other platforms such as Facebook and Twitter for antisemitic content.

The charity was among the groups that worked with TikTok to develop a Holocaust education initiative launched in early 2021.

After the storming of the Capitol in the United States in January 2021, the CST warned that calls for similar events to take place in the United Kingdom, including a proposed storming of Parliament or Downing Street, were appearing in far-right spaces online.

== Funding and finances ==
In May 2014, The Jewish Chronicle reported that the former chief executive of the CST, Richard Benson, (who had stepped down from the position in 2013) was one of the highest paid charity leaders within the British Jewish community, earning £170,000–190,000 per annum. The charity had an annual turnover of £7.34 million (making it one of the larger UK Jewish charities) and 63 employees.

Beginning in 2015, the UK government's Home Office has provided 'The Jewish Community Protective Security Grant' for the security of synagogues, schools and other Jewish centres, with the CST as the Grant Recipient. Home Secretary Sajid Javid pledged to increase funding, bringing the total amount allocated from 2015 to 2019 to £65.2 million. In 2020, the grant was renewed, and the CST received £14 million in funding for protecting the security of the Jewish community and its institutions. As of 2020, the CST had 1,500 volunteers.

As of 2020, the CST, led by new chief executive Mark Gardner, had 92 staff members, one of whom was paid at a similar rate of £170,000–179,000 per annum, according to the charity regulator, the Charity Commission for England and Wales.

Amidst a rise in antisemitism during the Gaza war, the UK government provided £3 million to the CST in October 2023, for a total of £18 million in funding for 2023. The additional funding provided additional security to more than 480 Jewish community institutions, including nearly 200 schools and more than 250 synagogues.

Prime Minister Rishi Sunak announced in February 2024 a new £72 million security package to fund the CST through 2028, inclusive of £18 million in funding for 2024–25.

== Criticism ==
British weekly newspaper The Jewish Chronicle published a number of articles in 2011 questioning the work and functioning of the CST. Gilbert Kahn, an American professor who attended a CST dinner, questioned why British Jews need to pay privately for security, when protection is expected to be a role of the state. Geoffrey Alderman, a columnist for the newspaper, questioned the right of the organization to represent the Jewish community on issues of security, and the opacity of its board of trustees, whose names are not public. He speculated in a later column that his concerns and scepticisms were more widely shared.

The organization was criticized by Haredi leaders in 2025 after five Jewish teenagers were arrested during raucous Purim celebrations in Golders Green. CST was accused of informing the police of the suspects' identities, which it denied doing.

== See also ==
- Campaign Against Antisemitism
- Shomrim (neighborhood watch group)
- Nonprofit Security Grant Program, a similar organization in the United States
- Secure Community Network, umbrella Jewish security agency in the United States
