= 2019 Jersey City shooting =

Mass shooting in New Jersey, U.S.

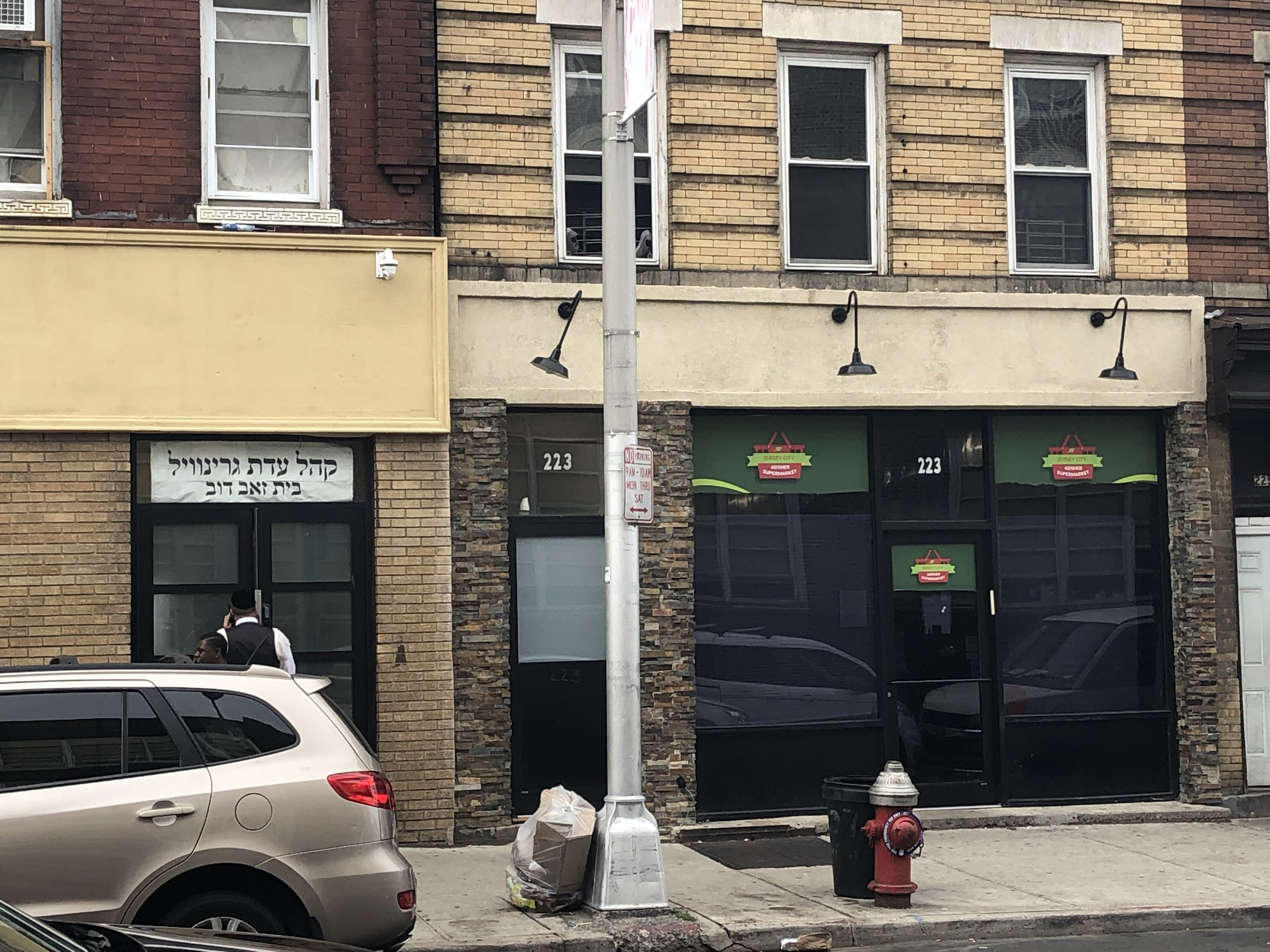
- Khal Adas Greenville and JC Kosher Supermarket (August 2019)

- Location: 40.70715°N 74.08367°W; JC Kosher Supermarket; 223 Martin Luther King Dr. Jersey City, New Jersey, U.S.
- Date: December 10, 2019 c. 12:20 – 3:45 p.m. (EST; UTC−05:00)
- Attack type: Shooting, siege, hate crime, domestic terrorism
- Weapons: AR-15–style rifle; Mossberg 12-gauge shotgun; 9mm Ruger; 9mm Glock 17; Ruger MK IV with homemade suppressor and homemade brass catcher (unused in main attack, used in Bayonne shooting); Pipe bomb (unused)
- Deaths: 7 (including both perpetrators and a victim killed on December 7)
- Injuries: 3
- Perpetrators: David Anderson and Francine Graham
- Motive: Antisemitism; Anti-law enforcement sentiment

On December 10, 2019, a shooting took place at a kosher grocery store in the Greenville section of Jersey City, New Jersey. Three people were killed at the store by two perpetrators, David N. Anderson and Francine Graham. The assailants also wounded one customer and two police officers before being killed by police during an ensuing shootout. A Jersey City Police Department detective had also been shot and killed by the assailants at a nearby cemetery just before the grocery store attack.

Anderson, who identified as a Black Hebrew Israelite, had a history of posting antisemitic and anti-law enforcement messages on social media; Attorney General of New Jersey Gurbir Grewal stated that evidence indicated that the attacks were acts of hate and domestic terrorism which were fueled by antisemitism and anti-police sentiment. Authorities believe that a much larger attack had been planned, but it was thwarted by the police detective's intervention at the cemetery. The shooting was part of a wave of violent attacks against Jews in the United States.

== Shootings ==
On December 10, 2019, a police detective, who was meeting a confidential informant, came across the assailants at the Bayview Cemetery in Jersey City, New Jersey in what was described as a chance encounter. It is believed that he approached the suspects, who were in a stolen U-Haul van that was linked to a murder in nearby Bayonne three days before. The assailants shot and killed the officer. His body was discovered by a bystander and reported at 12:38 p.m.

The suspects immediately fled in the stolen van and drove about one mile to a kosher grocery store, the JC Kosher Supermarket in the Greenville section of Jersey City, and they opened fire immediately after they exited the vehicle; the assault was exclusively directed towards the store, and bystanders in the street were ignored as a result. The two shooters wielded an AR-15-style weapon and Mossberg 12-gauge shotgun, respectively; a 9mm semi-automatic Ruger and a 9mm Glock 17 were also found in the store. At approximately 12:21 p.m., while wearing tactical gear, they entered the store and fatally shot the owner, an employee, and a customer. Authorities believe that the three victims were killed "within minutes" of the shooters' attack on the market. The employee of the store was reported to have been killed holding the back door open so that others could escape.

Two other customers were able to escape. In the ensuing shootout, the assailants exchanged gunfire with the police for more than three hours before they were shot and killed. A BearCat armored personnel carrier rammed through the storefront, ending the siege. Hundreds of shell casings were ultimately found at the scene.

The van was later found to contain a live pipe bomb that had the capacity to kill or injure people up to 500 yards away; the van had also been lined with homemade ballistic panels made of material from bulletproof vests. The suspects were also found to have material that could be used to make a second bomb. Investigators also found a .22 lr Ruger Mark IV handgun equipped with a homemade silencer and a homemade device to catch shell casings.

Multiple law enforcement agencies responded to the scene: the Jersey City Police Department, the Jersey City Fire Department Rescue Task Force, Jersey City Medical Center EMS, the Hudson County Sheriff's Office, the New Jersey State Police, the Bureau of Alcohol, Tobacco, Firearms and Explosives, the Federal Bureau of Investigation, the Port Authority of New York and New Jersey Police Department, the New York City Police Department and departments from other neighboring municipalities, and sheriffs from three counties.

== Victims ==
The assailants killed 40-year-old Detective Joseph Seals, who had been a police officer since 2006; 33-year-old female store owner Mindy Ferencz, a mother of three; 49-year-old employee Douglas Miguel Rodriguez, who was originally from Ecuador; and 24-year-old male rabbinical student Moshe Deutsch, who was a customer of the store. In addition to these victims, the assailants were identified as suspects in the December 7 murder of 34-year-old Jersey City resident Michael Rumberger in nearby Bayonne.

Two officers, one male and one female, were wounded in the shootout and were released from the hospital the same day. A wounded man escaped out the back door of the store. He was treated at Jersey City Medical Center, and released the same day.

== Assailants ==
On December 11, the shooters, both of whom were killed by police during the siege, were identified as David Nathaniel Anderson (age 47) and his girlfriend Francine Graham (age 50).

Anderson and Graham were suspects in the murder of Uber driver Michael Rumberger in Bayonne the weekend prior to the attack, on December 7. Rumberger's blood was found on a Bible that belonged to the assailants, and his DNA was on their clothes and one weapon. Anderson and Graham had Googled the meaning of the surname "Rumberger". According to Michael Rumberger's family, he was not Jewish.

Anderson and Graham were also suspects in an incident a week before the Jersey City shooting, when on December 3, two shots were fired at a vehicle which was being driven by a person who was clearly identifiable as being Jewish, on U.S. Route 1/9 near Newark and Elizabeth, New Jersey. The vehicle's rear window was shot out. Graham's phone was in the area at the time of the shooting, and it was later determined the ballistics matched a gun linked to the two assailants.

Anderson and Graham bought a number of weapons, and trained to use them in Ohio; video footage showed the pair undertaking target practice with long guns in Austintown, Ohio, on December 1, 2019. Before they engaged in the attack, they researched another possible attack on a Jewish community center in Bayonne. Video footage showed Anderson and Graham appearing to scout the JC Kosher Supermarket several times in the week leading up to the attack, including a drive-by an hour and a half before the shooting; authorities ultimately concluded the attack had been planned for months, and that during their reconnaissance, the attackers had entered the JC Supermarket on at least one occasion.

A Jewish day-school with 50 students was in the same building, leading Mayor of Jersey City Steven Fulop to believe that the building had been chosen partly for this reason. In January 2020, officials announced that evidence showed that Anderson and Graham had planned much larger attacks against both the Jewish community and law enforcement which could have resulted in dozens of casualties or more, but that the intervention by Detective Seals had disrupted these.

Anderson had made hundreds of posts on social media that were antisemitic, anti-police, or both. Anderson identified as a Black Hebrew Israelite, a movement which has no connection to mainstream Judaism and parts of which are listed as hate groups by the Southern Poverty Law Center, and social media posts by Anderson, sometimes under the alias "Dawad Maccabee," invoked tenets of Black Israelite philosophy. These included affirmations of the Khazar Myth, references to Jews as Nazis, the claim that Jews were "imposters who inhabited synagogues of Satan," and assertions that the police were under the control of Jews. A former neighbor recalled Anderson spending considerable time listening to what the neighbor believed were sermons by Louis Farrakhan, but other posts by Anderson accused Farrakhan of being a "rat" and a "con" for posing in photos with the members of the Neturei Karta, an extremist Orthodox Jewish sect.

A handwritten note inside the van said: "I do this because my creator makes me do this and I hate who he hates." Footage from inside the kosher supermarket records Anderson saying: "They stole our heritage, they stole our birthright, and they hired these guys to stop us." The note also contained a reference to a documentary movie with a reference to a time-stamp where an interviewee advocates "killing fascist cop pigs."

Mayor Fulop was among the first public officials to call the attack a hate crime; Mayor of New York City Bill de Blasio also called the attack a "premeditated violent antisemitic hate crime" and an "act of terror". Attorney General of New Jersey Gurbir Grewal stated that evidence indicated acts of hate and domestic terrorism fueled both by "hatred of the Jewish people and hatred of law enforcement."

== Aftermath ==
The Jersey City Medical Center, twelve Jersey City Public Schools in the vicinity, as well as that of Sacred Heart Church, located across the street, were on lockdown during the incident. That school was taken over by law-enforcement agencies and used during the incident. Between 50–60 children were held in the yeshiva of Khal Adas Greenville next to the market. Nearby public transit service on NJ Transit buses and the Hudson–Bergen Light Rail was suspended. The New Jersey Turnpike Newark Bay Extension was temporarily closed.

President Donald Trump was briefed about the incident at the White House. He gave his condolences to the victims and their families via a tweet. Governor of New Jersey Phil Murphy expressed his condolences, his thoughts and prayers for police, residents, and school children, and praise for the slain detective in a series of tweets. Bob Menendez, senior United States senator from New Jersey, Cory Booker, junior United States senator from New Jersey, and Mayor Fulop also expressed their condolences. On Twitter, Rep. Rashida Tlaib (D-Mich.) wrongly accused "white supremacists" of being responsible for the assault, deleting her tweet soon after.

Mayor Fulop said a trustee of the Jersey City Board of Education, Joan Terrell-Paige, should resign due to a Facebook message she posted after the shooting, in which she said black residents were "threatened, intimidated and harassed" by "brutes of the jewish community" [sic]. She made reference to accusations of rabbis selling body parts. Terrell-Paige, who is African American, further asked whether the public is "brave enough" to listen to the perpetrators' message. Governor Murphy concurred in asking Terrell-Paige to resign; she said she is unrepentant. The Anti-Defamation League asked Terrell-Paige to resign citing her "lack of remorse".

Fulop said that analysis of the assailants' computers showed that they likely intended to do more harm, that the yeshiva was the probable target of the attack, and that they "moved more quickly" with their plans because of their encounter with Detective Seals.

In January 2020, Jared Maples, director of the New Jersey Office of Homeland Security and Preparedness, said it was investigating possible funding sources for the attack, but with many lone wolf attacks they "do not need large amounts of funding to conduct their operations, making it difficult to detect and prevent attacks. The most common tactics in domestic extremist attacks include easily obtainable weapons, such as knives, small arms, and vehicles."

The market was re-opened by its owner at a nearby location in March 2020.

On October 7, 2020, a pawn shop dealer in Keyport, New Jersey whose phone number was found in Anderson's pocket pleaded guilty to the charge of being a felon in possession of a weapon.

In November 2020, a grand jury determined that the actions of 12 Jersey City officers and one Newark police detective who shot Anderson and Graham were justified and that no charges were warranted against them.

In 2022, a memorial bench to honor detective Joseph A. Seals was created at 16th Street Park in Bayonne.

== See also ==
- Antisemitism in the United States in the 21st-century
- Domestic terrorism in the United States
- Monsey Hanukkah stabbing (2019)
- Poway synagogue shooting (2019)
