= Chabad of Poway =

Orthodox synagogue in Poway, California

- Location in San Diego County

Religion
- Affiliation: Orthodox Judaism
- Ecclesiastical or organizational status: Synagogue
- Status: Active

Location
- Location: 16934 Chabad Way, Poway, San Diego County, California 92064
- Country: United States
- Interactive map of Chabad of Poway
- Coordinates: 33°01′09″N 117°03′11″W

Architecture
- Founder: Rabbi Yisroel Goldstein; Devorie Goldstein
- Established: 1986 (as a congregation)
- Completed: 1997
- Capacity: 770 worshippers

Website
- chabadpoway.com

Chabad of Poway is an Orthodox synagogue and community center in Poway, California. The congregation was founded in 1986, and the synagogue, completed in 1997, includes a 770-seat sanctuary, preschool, afternoon Hebrew school, senior center, library, and mikveh, serving the Jewish communities of Poway and Rancho Bernardo.

On April 27, 2019, the synagogue was the site of a shooting in which one person was killed and three were injured.

== History ==
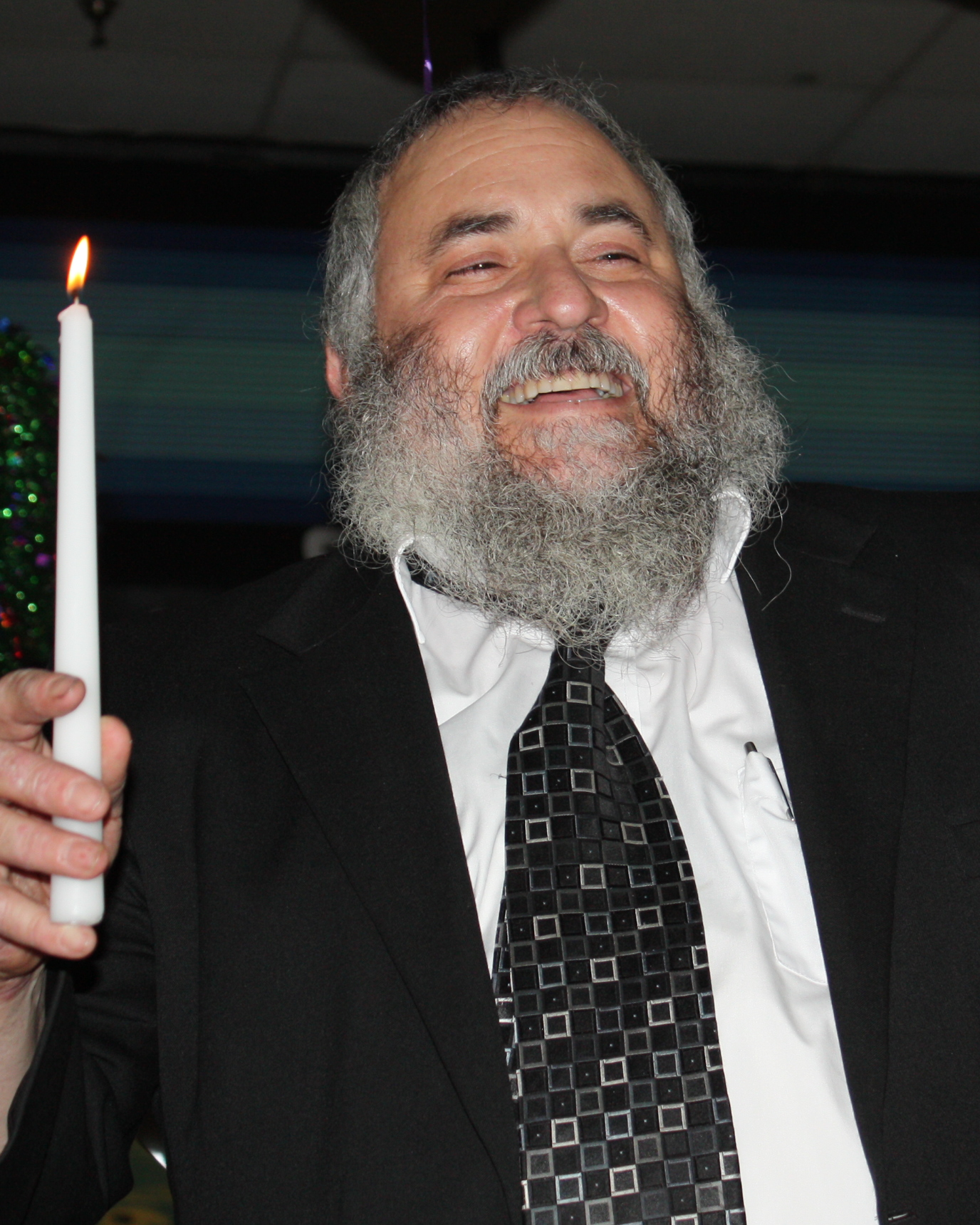
Rabbi Yisroel Goldstein in 2010

Chabad of Poway was founded in 1986 by Rabbi Yisroel Goldstein, a 24-year-old shaliach from Brooklyn, New York, and his new wife Devorie. The congregation first met in a storefront in the Rancho Bernardo shopping center, and then moved to a one-acre site where it opened a preschool in mobile trailers. A senior center was opened in 1990.

In 1997, the synagogue built a 20,000 sq ft (1,900 m^{2}) community center containing a 770-seat sanctuary, preschool, afternoon Hebrew school, senior center, library, mikveh, and meeting rooms. Shluchim Rabbi Mendy and Bluma Rubenfeld joined the staff of Chabad of Poway in 2005. In 2006, Goldstein was named the Jewish chaplain for the Poway Sheriff's Department.

In 2010, the synagogue enhanced its security measures by applying for and receiving a $75,000 grant from the Federal Emergency Management Agency (FEMA). It used the funds to add "security systems and alarms, a security assessment and installation of 16 cameras, fencing and lighting". In May 2018, the synagogue applied for a $150,000 FEMA grant to install gates and more secure doors. This grant was approved in September 2018, but the funds were not released until March 2019, one month before the shooting.

=== Goldstein charged for tax and wire fraud ===
On July 14, 2020, Goldstein pleaded guilty to tax and wire fraud for allegedly misusing at least $6.2 million in contributions and donations to the Chabad of Poway. According to a charge sheet filed in the United States District Court for the Southern District of California, Goldstein and five others had participated in elaborate tax fraud schemes using the synagogue's charitable status since the mid-1980s. In one scheme, Goldstein re-routed tax-deductible donations to the synagogue back to the donors, keeping a portion for himself. He also laundered illicit gains through the purchase of gold coins. The FBI and IRS began investigating the case in 2016 and Goldstein reportedly was planning to plead guilty to the charges in October 2018. After making his guilty plea in 2020, Goldstein returned $1 million in gold coins to the government and will be expected to pay $2.5 million in restitution to the IRS. The district attorney's office said it would recommend probation rather than a maximum five-year prison sentence, due to Goldstein's cooperation with investigators and his "lifetime of service" to the synagogue and community. However, the judge rejected that punishment "as not appropriate given the severity of the crimes", and sentenced Goldstein to 14 months in jail.

Upon learning of the case in late 2019, the synagogue removed Goldstein from his rabbinical position and the Chabad-Lubavitch headquarters in Crown Heights, New York, "dismissed him from his position as a representative of the movement". In November 2019, Goldstein's son, Rabbi Mendel Goldstein, took over the day-to-day rabbinic duties of the congregation.

== Shooting ==
On April 27, 2019, John Earnest, a 19-year-old male from the San Diego suburb of Rancho Peñasquitos, entered the synagogue building during services on the last day of the Jewish Passover holiday and opened fire in the foyer. One woman, 60-year-old Lori Gilbert-Kaye, was killed and three other people were wounded, including Goldstein. According to witnesses, Gilbert-Kaye had tried to shield Goldstein from the gunfire. The shooter's gun jammed after releasing ten bullets and two congregants, one an off-duty United States Border Patrol officer, chased him out of the building. A short while later, Earnest called 911 and reported the shooting. He was apprehended approximately 2 mi (3.2 km) from the synagogue. The suspect had an AR-style rifle in his possession at the time of his arrest and had made many antisemitic and Islamophobic comments.
