= 2019 Poway synagogue shooting =

Mass shooting in California, US

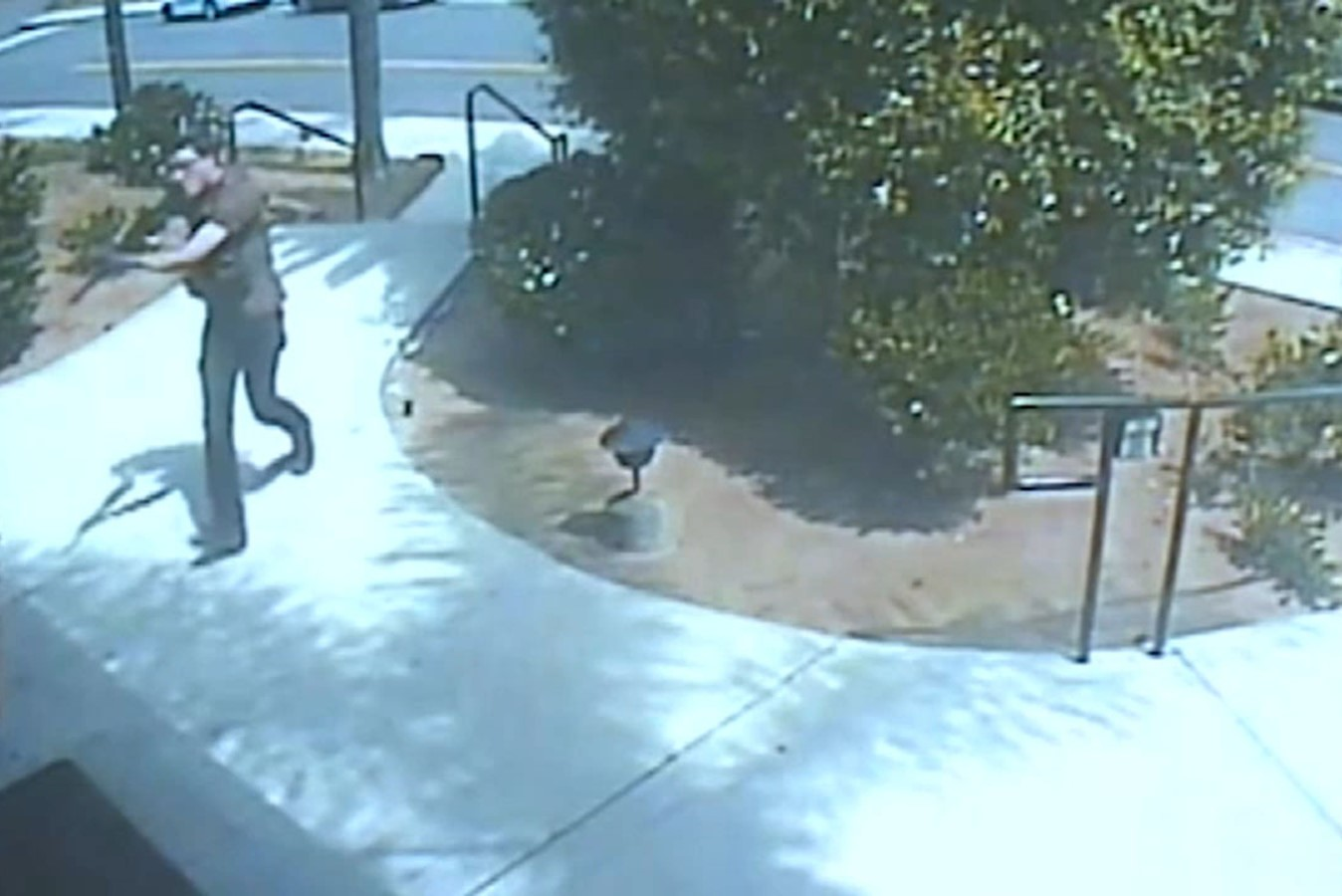
- Earnest approaching the synagogue

- Chabad of Poway (San Diego County, California) Chabad of Poway (California)
- Location: 33.0191°N 117.0531°W; Chabad of Poway, Poway, California, US
- Date: April 27, 2019; 7 years ago 11:23 a.m. (PDT)
- Target: Jews
- Attack type: Mass shooting
- Weapon: Smith & Wesson M&P15 Sport II semi-automatic rifle
- Deaths: 1
- Injuries: 3
- Perpetrator: John Earnest
- Defender: Jonathan Morales
- Motive: Antisemitism
- Convictions: State: Murder; Attempted murder (3 counts); Arson; Federal: 108 federal hate crime and civil rights violation charges

On April 27, 2019, a mass shooting occurred at the Chabad of Poway synagogue in Poway, California, United States, a city which borders the north inland side of San Diego, on the last day of the Jewish Passover holiday, which fell on a Shabbat. Armed with an AR-15–style rifle, the gunman, John Earnest, fatally shot one woman and injured three other people, including the synagogue's rabbi. After fleeing the scene, Earnest phoned 9-1-1 and reported the shooting. He was apprehended in his car approximately two miles (3.2 km) from the synagogue by a San Diego police officer. A month before the shooting, Earnest had attempted to burn down a mosque in Escondido.

In September 2021, Earnest was sentenced by a state court in San Diego County to life in prison without the possibility of parole, plus an additional 121 years to life and another 16 years as part of a plea agreement. In December, he was sentenced in federal court to life in prison with no chance of parole, plus 30 years, with the federal and state life sentences running consecutively instead of concurrently.

== Shooting ==
At approximately 11:23 a.m. PDT, a gunman, identified as 19-year-old John Earnest, a nursing student at California State University San Marcos, entered the Chabad of Poway synagogue on the last day of the Jewish holiday of Passover, which fell on a Shabbat. There were 54 people inside the synagogue at the time.

Earnest carried a Smith & Wesson Model M&P 15 Sport II semi-automatic rifle and was wearing a tactical vest containing five ten-round magazines. In the foyer, he shot and killed 60-year-old Lori Gilbert-Kaye with two bullets, and then wounded Rabbi Yisroel Goldstein, who had founded the congregation. Earnest then turned to a side room occupied by several people, including a number of children. He fired into the room, wounding one man with a bullet to the leg, and his 8-year-old niece.

He fired eight to ten rounds before his rifle jammed or malfunctioned, which prevented additional casualties. Two members of the congregation ran toward the shooter. Earnest then fled the synagogue, entering a Honda sedan. All the injured were expected to recover. Goldstein, who had been shot in the hand, lost his right index finger from the shooting, despite four hours of surgery. After Earnest fled, Goldstein spoke to the congregation despite his injury, telling them to stay strong. Jonathan Morales, an off-duty United States Border Patrolman who was a member of the synagogue, opened fire and hit Earnest's car multiple times, but he fled uninjured.

Excerpts from the 911 call

Shortly thereafter, the shooter phoned 9-1-1 and reported the shooting himself. Earnest was apprehended approximately two miles (3.2 km) from the synagogue by a San Diego police officer responding to the shooting. Earnest left his car and surrendered, and was taken into custody without incident. The rifle, a tactical helmet, and five loaded 10 round magazines, were recovered from Earnest's car. Earnest was wearing a tactical vest when he was arrested. Surveillance cameras at the synagogue captured video of the shooting. The attack occurred exactly six months after the Pittsburgh synagogue shooting.

== Perpetrator ==
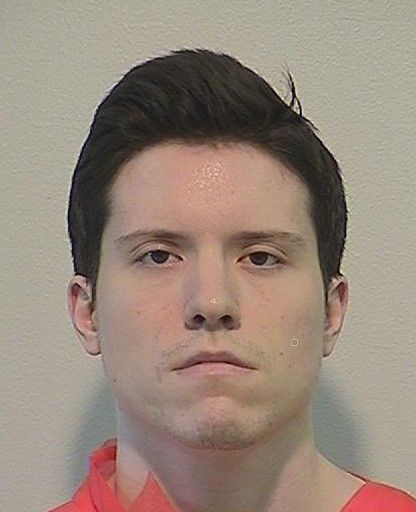
2022 mugshot image of Earnest

John Timothy Earnest (born June 8, 1999), a then 19-year-old male from the San Diego neighborhood of Rancho Peñasquitos, was identified as the shooter. He was a 2017 graduate of Mt. Carmel High School and a nursing school student at California State University San Marcos. Officials said he had no previous criminal record or contacts with police, and no known connection to any white supremacist group. Earnest was a member of the Escondido Orthodox Presbyterian Church, which is affiliated with the theologically traditionalist Orthodox Presbyterian Church.

Earnest had recently expressed white supremacist views to his college classmates and family, including saying that he studied Adolf Hitler, sending videos with antisemitic and anti-immigrant views to family members and a classmate in late 2018, and making racist statements at a 2019 holiday party with classmates. In the weeks before the shooting, two other nursing students reported Earnest to a professor, and an investigation was opened. However, as he had made no criminal threats, he was not expelled or arrested. Prosecutors said his radicalization started roughly 18 months before the shooting occurred, when he began viewing YouTube videos and visiting political boards on sites such as 4chan and 8chan.

An antisemitic and racist open letter over 4,000 words long was posted on 8chan on 27 April 2019, signed with Earnest's name. It claimed that Jews were orchestrating a "meticulously planned genocide of the European race", a reference to the white genocide conspiracy theory. Further, the manifesto rehashed several durably politicized antisemitic tropes like blood libel, the Cultural Marxism conspiracy theory, media control, and usury. Earnest denied that he had learned antisemitic beliefs from his family. He apparently attempted to livestream the shooting on Facebook, but failed. The Washington Post said the manifesto mirrored the Christchurch gunman's.

Earnest is believed to have written the letter, in which he cited shooters Brenton Tarrant and Robert Bowers for their involvement in the Christchurch mosque shootings and the Pittsburgh synagogue shooting, respectively. He said that Jesus, Paul the Apostle, Martin Luther, Adolf Hitler, Ludwig van Beethoven, "Moon Man" and Pink Guy were figures who inspired him to commit the shooting. Earnest made a joking mention of PewDiePie and referenced "The Day of the Rope", an event from William Luther Pierce's neo-Nazi novel The Turner Diaries (1978), in which African Americans and Hispanics are executed and urged more violent attacks. He condemned President Donald Trump as a pro-Zionist traitor.

=== Escondido mosque fire ===
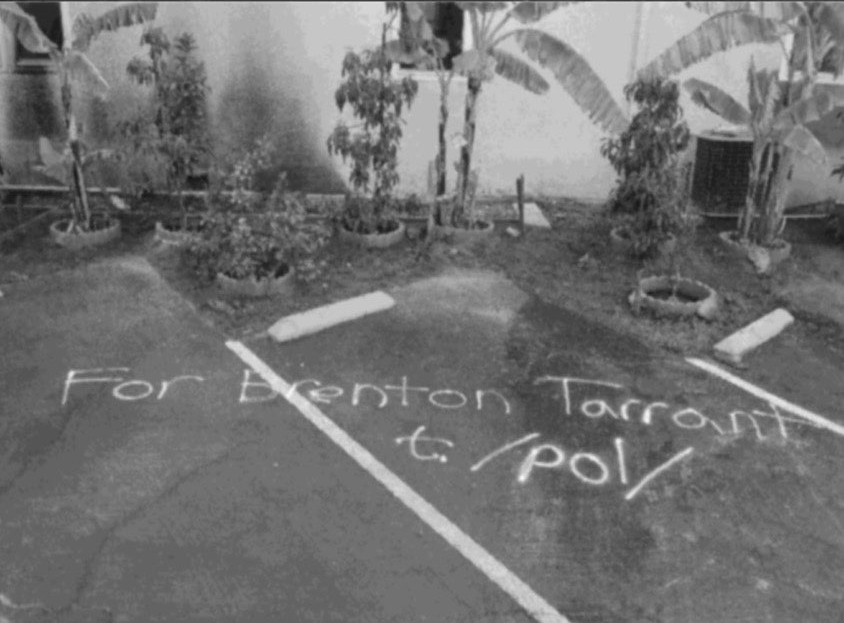
The graffiti left after the fire

A month before the shooting, on March 24, 2019, Earnest attempted to burn down the Dar-ul-Arqam mosque in Escondido, California. The fire was started at 3:15 am. The mosque is at 318 W. Sixth Ave, in Escondido, 30 miles (48 km) north of downtown San Diego; it had been converted from a church to a mosque. Seven people were inside the Islamic center; one of them was awake when the fire started. They smelled smoke, saw the fire and tried to stop it before firefighters arrived. The fire was extinguished before any major damage to the mosque or injuries occurred. Someone outside the building noticed the fire and called 9-1-1.

The mosque's CCTV recorded an individual breaking the lock on the mosque's parking lot gate and entering, before using a flammable liquid to set the mosque on fire. Escondido police lieutenant Chris Lick told the media that no suspect had been determined yet and that it looked like the fire was started by a chemical factor. Police said that they found graffiti referencing the Christchurch, New Zealand mosque incident in the parking lot. Police officers never reported the exact wording of the graffiti, although it was later revealed to have said, "For Brenton Tarrant -t. /pol/", a reference to the perpetrator of the Christchurch shooting and 8chan's /pol/ board, on which both men posted their manifestos. Fire investigators, the San Diego County Sheriff's Bomb/Arson Unit, the FBI and the ATF investigated the incident as arson and a hate crime.

Yusef Miller, a spokesman for the Islamic community in Escondido, told Muslims who lived in the region to be cautious. Dustin Craun, executive director of the San Diego office of the Council on American–Islamic Relations (CAIR), condemned the attack and asked the police for more security around the mosque and protection at Islamic institutions across California. Also, CAIR held online meetings with hundreds of mosques and urged them to increase their security. A web page was set up on a crowdfunding site for donations to rebuild the mosque. During this campaign, more than 250 supporters donated over $5,000, far short of the ultimate goal of $20,000.

== Aftermath ==
In December 2019, a Poway street was renamed as Lori Lynn Lane to honor Lori Lynn Gilbert-Kaye, the woman who was killed in the shooting.

The California State Legislature passed AB 1548 to establish the California State Nonprofit Security Grant Program in 2019, awarding up to $200,000 per year to religious, political, and mission-based institutions. The state allocated $12 million to the program, administered by the California Governor's Office of Emergency Services, in 2019. Security grants had previously been a line item in the state budget since 2015.

In November 2021, the San Diego Union-Tribune reported that, through a friend, Earnest had recently sent them three written statements in which he said that he wanted to publicly repent for the shooting, citing religious imperatives. These statements included white supremacist and antisemitic references.

=== Reactions ===
'President Trump Delivers a Statement Upon Marine One Departure' video from the White House

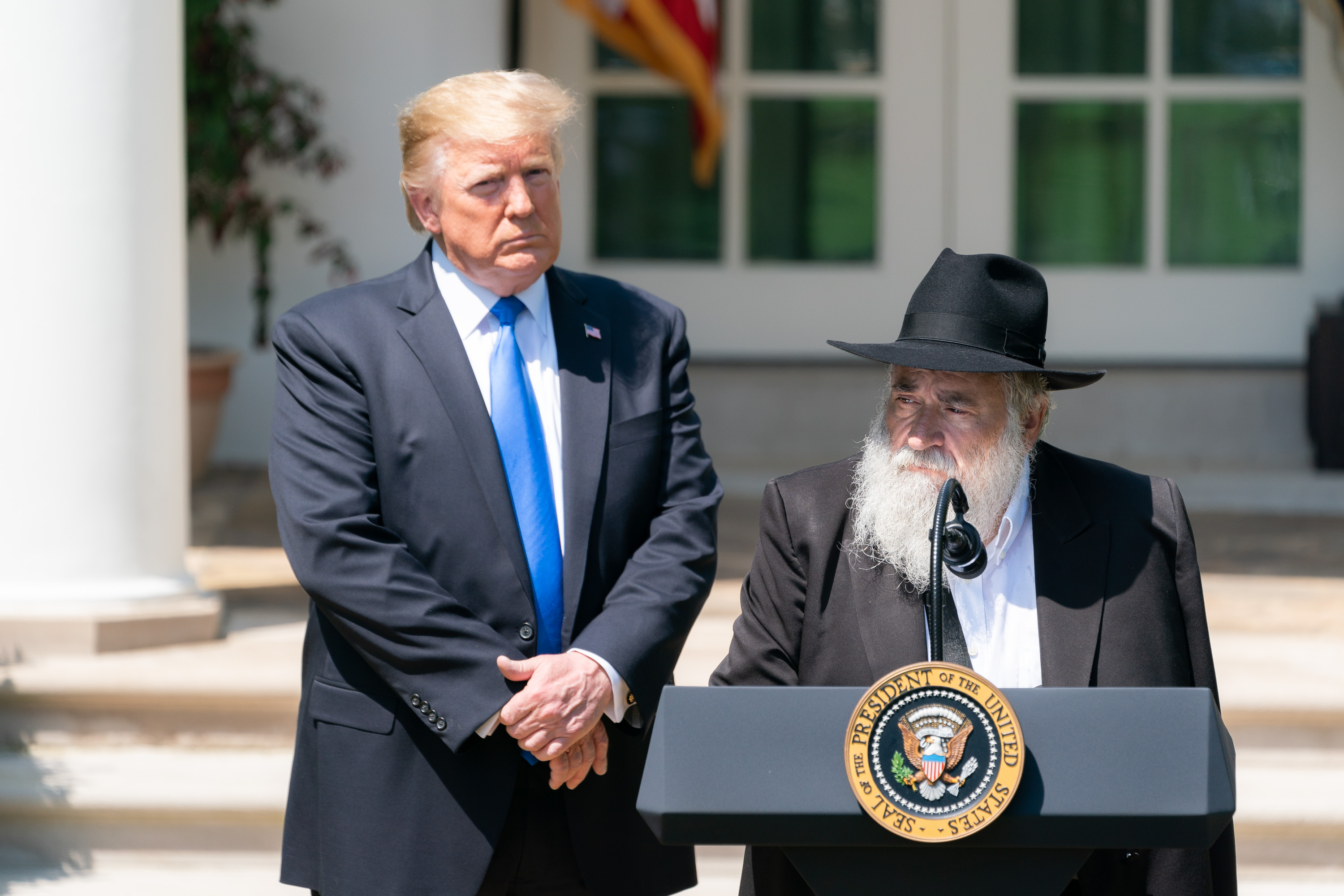
Trump listens as Rabbi Yisroel Goldstein of the Chabad of Poway speaks in the White House Rose Garden on the National Day of Prayer, May 2, 2019.

President Donald Trump offered "deepest sympathies to the families of those affected" by the shooting, further saying that "[o]ur entire nation mourns the loss of life, prays for the wounded and stands in solidarity with the Jewish community. We forcefully condemn the evil of anti-Semitism and hate, which must be defeated". Vice President Mike Pence stated "We condemn in the strongest terms the evil & cowardly shooting at Chabad of Poway today as Jewish families celebrated Passover. No one should be in fear in a house of worship. Antisemitism isn't just wrong - it's evil."

On May 2, 2019, during his remarks in the White House Rose Garden on the National Day of Prayer, President Trump invited Rabbi Yisroel Goldstein and the two men who had chased the shooter out of the synagogue to address the gathering. Goldstein was invited by Israeli Ambassador to the United Nations Danny Danon to speak on antisemitism before the UN General Assembly on June 26. 2020 Democratic Presidential Candidates Bernie Sanders, Kamala Harris, Joe Biden, and Eric Swalwell published statements condemning the attack. California governor Gavin Newsom responded by saying, "No one should have to fear going to their place of worship, and no one should be targeted for practicing the tenets of their faith."

The United States Holocaust Memorial Museum released a statement which read "[M]oving forward this must serve as yet another wake-up call that antisemitism is a growing and deadly menace. All Americans must unequivocally condemn it and confront it whenever it appears."

Prime Minister of Israel Benjamin Netanyahu stated "I condemn the abhorrent attack on a synagogue in California; this is an attack on the heart of the Jewish people. The international community must step up the struggle against anti-Semitism." President of Israel Reuven Rivlin wrote, "The murderous attack on the Jewish community during Pesach, our holiday of freedom, and just before Holocaust Memorial Day, is yet another painful reminder that anti-Semitism and hatred of Jews is still with us, everywhere. No country and no society are immune. Only through education for Holocaust remembrance and tolerance can we deal with this plague."

At a press conference on the day after the shooting, Rabbi Yisroel Goldstein, who was injured in the shooting, called to "battle darkness with light." He suggested that the United States call for a moment of silence in public schools.

On April 29, the parents of the shooter issued a formal statement disavowing his actions, reading in part: "To our great shame, he is now part of the history of evil that has been perpetrated on Jewish people for centuries." Their attorney noted that the family will not pay for Earnest's defense, instead leaving him to likely be represented by a public defender. The Orthodox Presbyterian Church issued a statement reading in part, "We deplore and resist all forms of anti-Semitism and racism. We are wounded to the core that such an evil could have gone out from our community. Such hatred has no place in any part of our beliefs or practices, for we seek to shape our whole lives according to the love and gospel of Jesus Christ" and that "that "[a]nti-Semitism and racist hatred which apparently motivated the shooter [...] have no place within our system of doctrine."

According to The Washington Post, the shooter's manifesto, which expressed Christian motives for killing Jews, resulted in a social media debate among Christian pastors. Rev. Duke Kwon of the Presbyterian Church in America expressed concern that the shooter could articulate a Christian theology of personal salvation while also espousing anti-Semitism. He and other ministers denied that Christian theology and Scripture provide support for anti-Semitism.

In People Love Dead Jews, a book of essays on antisemitism published shortly after the shooting, Dara Horn wrote, "After [the Pittsburgh synagogue shooting], I knew what to tell my children to comfort them: that this wasn't like those ancient horror stories, that our neighbors love us, that America is different. After [the Poway shooting], I no longer knew what to tell them."

=== Legal proceedings ===
On April 30, 2019, Earnest was charged in San Diego County Superior Court with one count of murder and three counts of attempted murder. All four charges included "hate-crime and gun allegations", which can incur more severe penalties upon conviction. The murder charge includes a "special circumstance" that Earnest intentionally killed his victim (Gilbert-Kaye) because of her religion, which could incur the death penalty under California law. Earnest pleaded not guilty to all the charges. A criminal complaint was also filed charging Earnest with arson of a house of worship, a reference to the March arson attempt against a mosque in Escondido. Earnest was ordered held without bail. A trial readiness hearing was scheduled for May 30 and a preliminary hearing for July 8.

On May 14, Earnest was arraigned in the United States District Court for the Southern District of California in San Diego on 109 federal charges: 54 counts of obstruction of free exercise of religious beliefs using a dangerous weapon resulting in death, bodily injury and attempts to kill; 54 counts of hate crimes under the Matthew Shepard and James Byrd Jr. Hate Crimes Prevention Act; and one count of damage to a religious property using fire for the earlier arson at Dar-ul-Arquam mosque in Escondido on March 24. Earnest was represented by a federal public defender. On December 5, the court announced a trial date of June 2, 2020. This date was delayed due to the COVID-19 pandemic and the San Diego County District Attorney's office announced it would seek the death penalty. Prosecutors scheduled a press conference to discuss trial details on March 5 and the trial would not occur until at least March 15, 2021. On July 20, 2021, Earnest pleaded guilty to the charges.

On September 30, 2021, Earnest, then 22, was sentenced to life in prison without the possibility of parole, plus an additional 121 years to life and another 16 years as part of a plea agreement reached with the San Diego County District Attorney's Office. On December 28, 2021, Earnest was sentenced in San Diego Federal Court to life in prison with no chance of parole, plus 30 years. Senior US district judge Anthony Battaglia said the federal and state life sentences would run one after the other instead of concurrently. Earnest will serve the sentence in federal custody.

== See also ==
- Halle synagogue shooting
- Monsey Hanukkah stabbing
- Antisemitism in Christianity
- List of attacks on Jewish institutions
