= Matthew DeSarno =

American FBI Agent

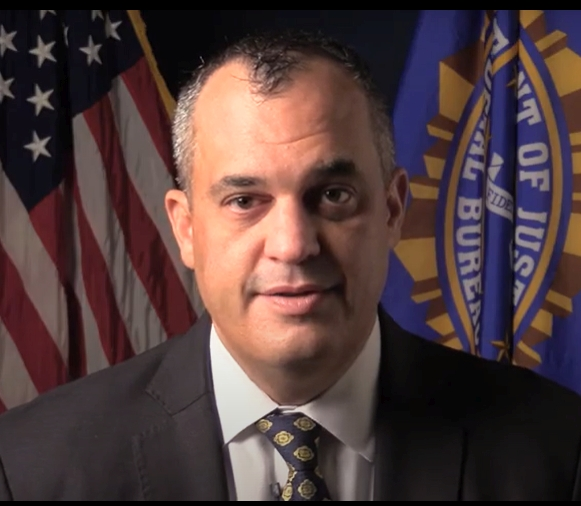
- DeSarno in September 2020, with FBI
- Born: 1972 (age 53–54)
- Education: St. John's College High School, 1991; University of Richmond, 1995
- Occupations: Technology executive; journalist; former FBI official
- Employer(s): Odin Labs, Inc.
- Known for: FBI leadership
- Board member of: One CommunityUSA (Advisory Board) Secure Community Network (National Security Advisory Board)
- Awards: 2021 Presidential Rank Award Recipient

Matthew J. DeSarno is a former Federal Bureau of Investigation special agent in charge of the FBI Dallas field office. He led the office during high-profile incidents like the 2019 Dallas courthouse shooting, the 2020 capture and trial of Yaser Abdel Said, and the 2022 Colleyville synagogue hostage crisis, resulting in the safe recovery of all of the hostages and the fatal shooting of the perpetrator, Malik Akram. DeSarno is currently the CEO of Verfico Technology, which focuses on wage theft and risk management.

== Education and military service ==
Matthew DeSarno, like his uncle before him and several of his siblings after, attended the St. John's College High School in Washington, D.C., graduating in 1991. He completed his undergraduate study at the University of Richmond in 1995.

DeSarno then served in the U.S. Army infantry as an officer in the First Cavalry Division, stationed at Fort Hood. He deployed to Bosnia-Herzegovina as part of the NATO mission ensuring compliance with the Dayton Agreement.

== Career ==
Upon completion of his military service obligation, DeSarno sought to join the FBI, but a federal hiring freeze pushed him to take short stints in the private sector until at the age of 29, DeSarno was able to join the FBI Academy in June 2002.

His FBI work began in San Diego focused on violent gangs and a Mexican mafia member. A promotion in 2007 to a supervisory role brought him to the Safe Streets and Gang Unit at FBI headquarters in Washington. In 2009, DeSarno transferred to Chicago, and in 2013 was promoted to assistant special agent in charge, managing civil rights, public corruption, and white-collar crime programs; later expanding to include SWAT, violent crime, international organized crime, evidence response, and crisis negotiation.

Back to headquarters in 2015, DeSarno was named chief of strategic operations at the Counterterrorism Division, then promoted in 2017 to deputy assistant director of the division and special agent in charge of the Criminal Division in 2018.

In 2019, he took the position of Special Agent in Charge at the Dallas bureau, with 600 personnel under him. His work in Dallas included high-profile incidents in the region, the detainment of a Dallas-born suspect aligned with ISIS, the rescue of child trafficking victims, the arrest of a Texas sympathizer of a Pakistani terror organization, the conviction of three Texas men targeting gay men to commit hate crimes, and the identification and apprehension of at least 40 Texas-based suspects in the January 6 United States Capitol attack. He retired from the FBI at the end of October 2022.

Post-FBI Career

After retiring from the FBI in October 2022, DeSarno co-founded Verfico Technology, Inc., an enterprise software company focused on wage assurance and workforce compliance for the commercial construction industry. The company developed a technology platform enabling general contractors to monitor how subcontractors compensate workers, reducing exposure to wage theft litigation and regulatory noncompliance. The idea originated with DeSarno's brother Nick, a drywall contractor in Washington, D.C., who had faced a wage theft subpoena and struggled to find a technology solution to prevent it.

Verfico was accepted into the MetaProp real estate technology accelerator program in 2024. In January 2025, Odin — a New York-based construction workforce visibility and compliance platform — announced the acquisition of Verfico in a stock transfer deal. As part of the acquisition, DeSarno became President of the combined company, which retained the Odin name. The merger launched Odin 3.0, described as the first end-to-end worker-level compliance platform for the construction industry. Beginning in late 2025, DeSarno became a contributing columnist for The Dallas Morning News, writing on national security, law enforcement, the rule of law, and public policy.

Awards and honors

In 2021, DeSarno was named a recipient of the Presidential Rank Award — Meritorious Executive, the highest honor conferred by the President of the United States on career members of the Senior Executive Service, awarded for sustained extraordinary accomplishment in federal service.

== Personal ==
DeSarno's father James was an FBI agent, and his mother Mary Ellen (Gladmon) DeSarno was a Catholic school teacher. Matthew is married to wife Caroline.
