= Jewish Federations of North America =

Umbrella organization of Jewish communities

- Abbreviation: JFNA
- Formation: January 31, 1935; 91 years ago
- Tax ID no.: 13-1624240
- Legal status: 501(c)(3) nonprofit organization
- Headquarters: New York City
- Region served: North America
- President and CEO: Eric D. Fingerhut
- Subsidiaries: United Israel Appeal Inc.; JFBP LLC
- Revenue: $279 million (2023)
- Expenses: $283 million (2023)
- Website: jewishfederations.org
- Formerly called: United Jewish Appeal; United Jewish Communities

The Jewish Federations of North America (JFNA), formerly the United Jewish Communities (UJC), is an American Jewish umbrella organization for the Jewish Federations system, representing 141 local Federations and hundreds of smaller independent Jewish communities across North America that raise and distribute over $2 billion annually, including through planned giving and endowment programs, to support social welfare, social services and educational needs. Jewish Federations also provides fundraising, organization assistance, training, and overall leadership to the Jewish Federations and communities throughout the United States and Canada.

Some of the communal organizations that Jewish Federation gives funding to include Jewish Community Centers, Jewish day schools and summer camps, Jewish Family Services, Hillels and Moishe Houses and Israel-related organizations such as Birthright. Jewish Federations government and advocacy team works towards protecting minority rights and combatting forms of hate, including antisemitism.

JFNA was formed from the merger of the United Jewish Appeal (UJA), Council of Jewish Federations, and the United Israel Appeal in 1999 as the UJC. JFNA—as it was renamed in 2009—has three core international partners: The Jewish Agency for Israel, The American Jewish Joint Distribution Committee, and World ORT, for which the Federations system provides the largest amount of unrestricted funding each year. The organization hosts an annual General Assembly event for the broad North American Jewish community.

Local Jewish Federations are secular Jewish non-profit organization found within many metropolitan areas across the United States with a significant Jewish community. They provide supportive and human services, philanthropy, financial grants to refugees around the world, humanitarian and disaster relief, host leadership conferences and fellowship opportunities for women and youth, charitable drives, help those in need navigate comprehensive resources, and provide outreach to at-risk Jewish populations in 70 countries worldwide, and more. While the Jewish Federation was created to primarily service Jewish communities, they also provide for other communities. All federations in North America operate an annual central campaign, then allocate the proceeds to affiliated local agencies.

== Leadership ==
The current Jewish Federations of North America Chairman is Gary Torgow. The CEO & President is Eric D. Fingerhut.

== History ==
Starting in 1654, when the first Jewish communal settlement in New Amsterdam (modern-day New York) began despite Governor Peter Stuyvesant's attempts to ban the first Jewish people in North America from the settlement (until he would be overruled), and for the next 250 years; the Jewish community promised local governments they would not become a burden, by taking care of their own community. Throughout this period, as the Jewish community continued to grow in what would become the United States, they "established synagogues, burial societies, credit unions, and Hebrew youth societies in dozens of cities before there was a single federation."

According to Historian, Donald Feldstein in The Jewish Federation: The First Hundred Years:

″There is no single source where one can find a comprehensive history of the Jewish Federation in North America...The first Jewish Federation in the United States was founded in Boston in 1895, another was organized in Cincinnati, Ohio, and within several years federations sprung up around the country wherever there were significant Jewish communities."

The founding philosophies of the first Jewish Federations in America were based in secularism, but deeply influenced by Jewish tradition, like Hesed (loving kindness); and organized like the Kehilla, a communal organization found in diverse regions throughout Eastern Europe at the time; created to meet the welfare needs of Jewish communities in an inclusive and comprehensive way. However, unlike the Kehilla, which were usually formed under the authority of local governments to collect taxes from the Jewish community in support of services, the Jewish Federation in the United States has always been fully autonomous.^{61-62}

The first Jewish federation was founded in Boston in 1895 as Associated Jewish Philanthropies. Cincinnati formed its federation, United Jewish Social Agencies, the next year. Chicago founded its federation in 1900 followed by St. Louis. Federations were soon formed in many other cities with large Jewish populations. Initially (1895–1945) the federation system was focused on welfare needs of individual Jews with the goal of integrating them into the US. The Jewish federations inspired the 1913 formation of the forerunner of the United Way, the community chest in Cleveland, Ohio.

=== Council of Jewish Federations (1932–1999) ===
The National Council of Jewish Federations and Welfare Funds was formed in 1932 as the umbrella organization for Jewish federations in the United States. "National" was dropped from the name in 1935 and "Welfare Funds" was removed in 1979 to become the Council of Jewish Federations (CJF).

=== United Jewish Appeal (1939–1999) ===
United Jewish Appeal
- Abbreviation: UJA
- Formation: January 1939
- Founder: Arthur Loewengart
- Type: Non-Profit organization
- Headquarters: New York City, U.S.

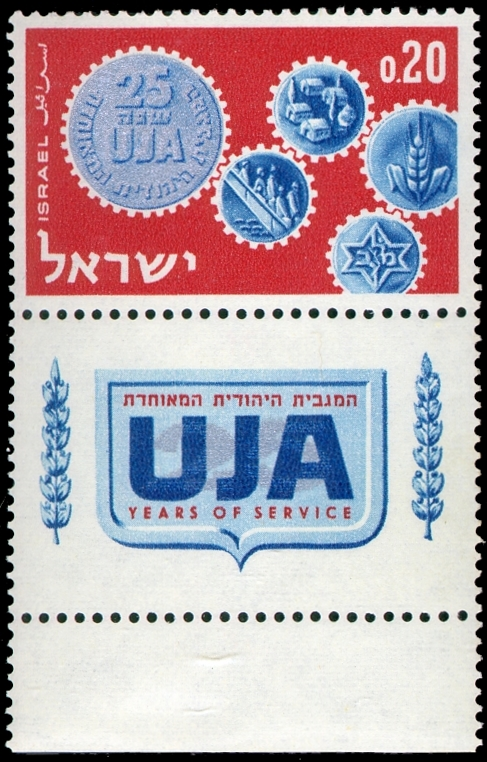
Israeli postal stamp, 1962

The United Jewish Appeal for Refugees and Overseas Needs (UJA) was founded in January 1939 to combine the efforts of the American Jewish Joint Distribution Committee (JDC), led by Rabbi Jonah Wise; the United Israel Appeal led by Rabbi Abba Hillel Silver; and the National Coordinating Committee Fund led by William Rosenwald. Its founders emphasized that the worsening crisis facing European Jewish people in Europe and Palestine would require three to four times the funds raised in the previous year. Under the unified campaign, each organization retained its distinct responsibilities: the JDC focused on aid to Jewish people in Europe; the United Israel Appeal supported the Jewish community in Israel, including incoming refugees; and the National Coordinating Committee Fund assisted refugees arriving in the United States.

=== United Jewish Communities ===
In 1999, the UJA, CJF, and United Israel Appeal merged to create United Jewish Communities. Amid declining influence and a shift toward donor-directed philanthropy, local federations gained greater control, selecting two-thirds of the new board. Philanthropist Charles Bronfman became volunteer chairman, leading the organization's strategic planning.

=== Jewish Federations of North America ===
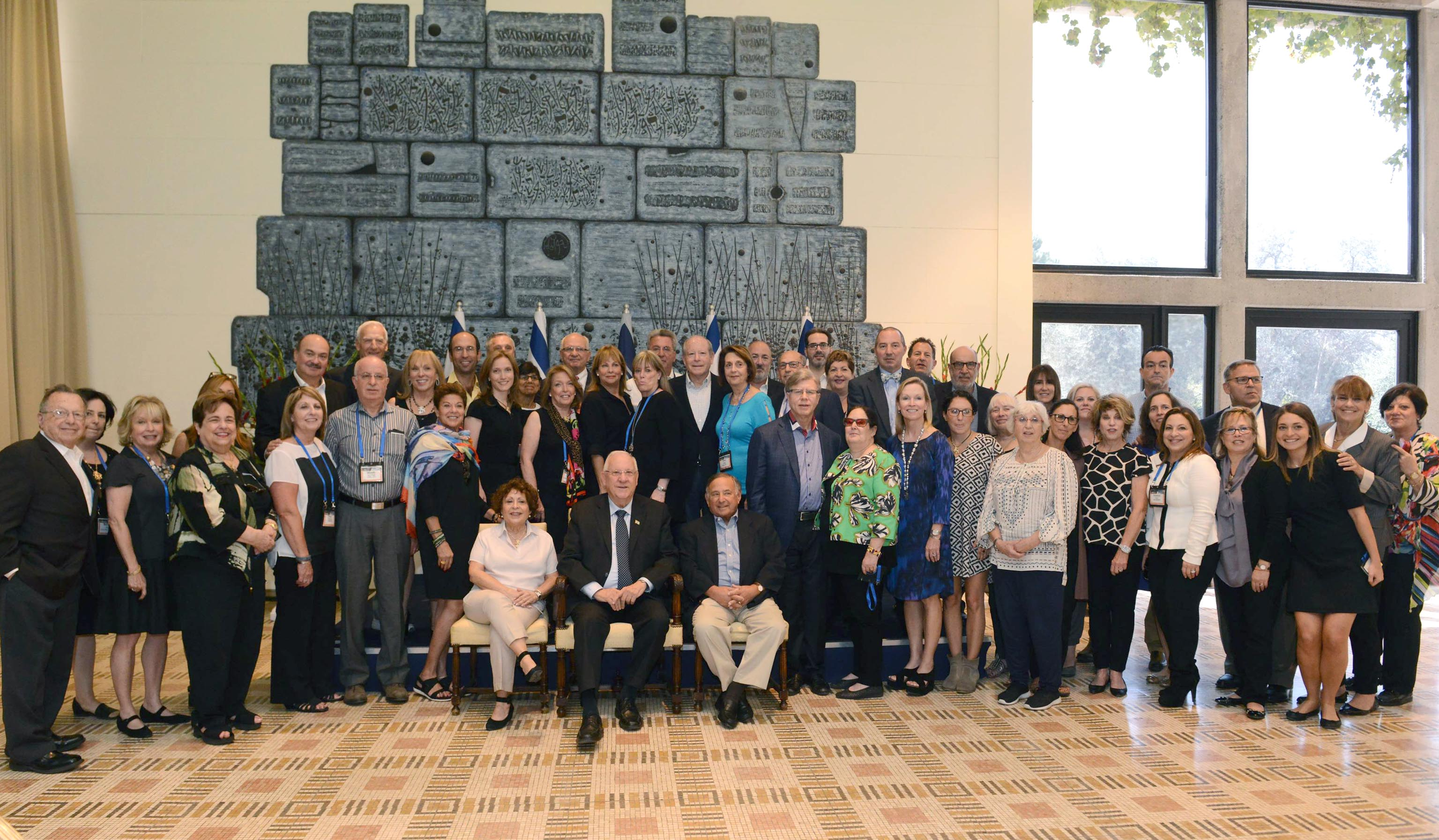
Delegation of Jewish Federations of North America in Beit HaNassi, Israel. In the background is an Israeli volcanic ash artwork.

In October 2009, the UJC was renamed the Jewish Federations of North America, and many local federations subsequently adopted variations of its new logo.

After a couple of years of lower staff layoffs in February 2010, new CEO Jerry Silverman laid off three senior vice presidents that made an estimated $750,000 to $1 million combined.

== Campaigns ==
=== LiveSecure Campaign ===
On October 27, 2018, there was a shooting inside a Pittsburgh synagogue, Tree of Life, during Shabbat morning services. This shooting became known as the deadliest attack on a local Jewish community in American history, killing eleven people and wounding 6. In response to the shooting, Jewish Federation of North America announced the $54 million LiveSecure campaign in 2021, to provide security for Jewish communities. The campaign brought in a total of $130 million after initially raising $62 million, surpassing the $54 million goal, and adding local matching grants over the following years. As a result of the LiveSecure campaign, in collaboration with the Secure Community Network, more than 130 communities are equipped with professional security programs, helping to protect Jewish places of worship, JCCs, and Jewish institutions. Beyond physical security, the campaign brought elevated efforts to combat antisemitism through education, civic engagement, and interfaith partnerships to counter misinformation. In 2026, Jewish Federations announced that every Jewish Federation in North America is now involved in the LiveSecure Campaign.

=== Ukraine Emergency Campaign ===
In December 2021, Jewish Federations began receiving regular updates from the Jewish Agency and JDC, regarding the buildup of Russian troops along the Ukraine border. As a result, Jewish Federations held multiple briefings to local Federation leadership to ensure they were up to date on the fast-changing situation. In 2022, when war with Russia broke out, Jewish Federations launched an emergency fundraising campaign with partners The Jewish Agency and JDC, with a goal of raising $20 million to support the Ukrainian Jewish community. Within one month the goal was met and Jewish Federation ultimately raised $100 million for essential needs, including meals, medical care, clothing, and mental health support for the nearly 10 million Ukrainians forced from their homes.

=== Israel Emergency Fund ===
In 2023, after the October 7 attacks by Hamas in Israel, the Jewish Federations of North America launched the largest emergency campaign in its history, known as the Israel Emergency Fund. In less than one month, the Federations' Israel Emergency Fund raised more than $500 million. In that time, the funds helped pay for more than 48,000 food package deliveries and over 238,000 hot meals to individuals in at-risk communities.

For the months that followed, the campaign expanded to serve the continuous needs in Israel, including lifeline services such as food, shelter and support to displaced Israeli's from their homes; medical supplies to hospitals, ambulances, and emergency response units; donations to suffering businesses and families; and community building with a focus on post-trauma relief. The Israel Emergency Campaign raised $908 million, with 100% of the funding going to over 4,200 grants to 877 NGO partners, including support for 208 communities across Israel. Federations care went beyond just the Jewish community, but sought to send care to populations who have particular or specialized needs during this emergency, including Arabic, Amharic, and Russian-speaking populations, at-risk youth, LGBTQ+ communities, women, Bedouin communities and people with disabilities. The largest share of donations went to the Jewish Agency, the Joint Distribution Committee, and non-profits in the Gaza Envelope. Other agencies that received funding include United Hatzalah, Magen David Adom, ZAKA, Chabad, and dozens of hospitals and medical organizations.

The Jewish Federations also contributed nearly $7 million to a new program in partnership with Israel's Ministry of Health which created 16 community-based mental health centers to provide services to 200,000 Israelis each year. The program serves those suffering with post-traumatic stress disorder since October 7.

The Israel Emergency Loan Fund provided donations to businesses across Israel impacted by the war who do not have access to traditional banking credit. Through ReGrow Israel, Jewish Federations supported the farming communities of Western Negev with grants of $12.5 million to replace equipment destroyed. Federations also aided in replanting apple orchards and grape vineyards in the North of Israel, which had been destroyed by members of Hamas.

=== Rebuild Israel ===
In November 2025, Jewish Federations of North America announced at its annual General Assembly that it was shifting to a new long-term recovery effort campaign called "Rebuild Israel." This campaign is an extension of the Israel Emergency Campaign and it's purpose is to help Israel recover and flourish after the October 7 massacre and the subsequent wars in Gaza and with Iran.

Rebuild Israel focuses on building relationships with partnering organizations and addressing Israel's long-term recovery needs including mental health, education, and support. Jewish Federation wants to build on established partnerships through the Israel Emergency Fund including communities across Israel, and Kibbutzim and Moshavim directly impacted by the October 7 attacks. Secondly, the focuses on expanding collaborations with partners such as the Jewish Agency for Israel and the American Joint Distribution Committee (JDC). By shifting from emergency relief funds, Rebuild Israel aims to have a lasting effect on security, resilience, and prosperity.

=== Operation Roaring Lion ===
Following the launch of Operation Roaring Lion and Iran's missile attacks against Israel in 2026, Jewish Federations of North America mobilized an emergency response network to address the humanitarian needs across the country. Building on the infrastructure established through the Israel Emergency Fund after October 7, Federations coordinated with partners, local municipalities and nonprofit organizations to deliver immediate assistance to affected communities.

Within the first month of the operation, Jewish Federations supported victims of terror, displaced families, vulnerable populations, reservists and their families, and Israelis spending extended periods of time in bomb shelters. With over $30 million in emergency funding, support was provided to food and essential supplies, temporary housing, mental health services, volunteer coordination, and community resilience programs. Jewish Federations also released an initial $5 million in emergency allocations within days of the attacks to address urgent needs created by the Iranian missile strikes. These needs included assistance for hospitals and emergency service providers.

== Advocacy ==
Advocacy Efforts in Washington, DC

JFNA's forerunner UJC first proposed the idea for the Nonprofit Security Grant to Congress in 2004, in the aftermath of the September 11 attacks on the United States. That same year, it created the Secure Communities Network (SCN) alongside the Conference of Jewish Presidents of Major American Organizations. In the years since the creation of NSGP, Federations have advocated for increased funding for the program to meet the community's growing security needs which include providing guards, surveillance, and hardened infrastructure as threats escalate and violent attacks occur.

Following May 2025 shooting deaths of Sarah Milgrim and Yaron Lischinsky, two young Israeli embassy employees, Jewish Federations, along with 42 other Jewish organizations, put out a statement calling for support from the United States government for enhanced security measures known as the "Six-Point Security Plan."

In June 2025, Jewish Federations brought together nearly 400 Jewish leaders representing more than 100 Jewish communities across the nation gathered in Washington, DC for the United for Security Emergency Leadership Mission to advocate for the plan.

Federations CEO & President Eric D. Fingerhut followed those meetings with a letter to members of the Subcommittee on Counterterrorism and Intelligence, House Committee on Homeland Security, sharing that security costs the Jewish community $765 million annually and presented the six-point security plan.

In May 2026, Jewish Federations led another large-scale advocacy mission to Capitol Hill, bringing together over 400 Jewish leaders from 82 communities focused on advancing the bipartisan Jewish American Security Act. With more than 200 meetings with Members of Congress, these leaders pushed to strengthen federal efforts to combat antisemitism and enhance security of Jewish institutions. Jewish Federations also partnered with congressional leaders on the House companion bill, which includes a proposed $1 billion authorization for the Nonprofit Security Grant Program. Expanded support for houses of worship, enhanced law enforcement resources and new federal initiatives to address antisemitism on college campuses.

== Studies ==
The "Surge"

The October 7 Hamas attack on Israel prompted an increase in Jewish communal engagement in North America. A survey conducted by Jewish Federations shows what is now called "The Surge"; Of the 83% of Jews who were "only somewhat," "not very," or "not at all engaged" prior to October 7, 2023, 40% are now showing up in Jewish life in large numbers. This group, which is equal to 30% of all Jewish adults and nearly double the proportion of Jews who identify as "deeply-engaged," represents a broadening and deepening Jewish life. A follow up survey in 2025 showed continued engagement with 31% still seeking or engaging in Jewish life. A third survey conducted in 2026 found that the Surge had grown by seven percentage points to 38%.

Small Jewish Communities Study

In 2026, Jewish Federations of North America released new information examining the experiences of Jews living in smaller communities across North America. The study found that Jews in smaller communities report lower levels of engagement in Jewish life (28% compared with 40% nationally) and lower feelings of belonging (32% compared with 42%). However, small Jewish communities' desire for Jewish connections remain strong. Following October 7, 2023, Jews in small communities increased their engagement at rates comparable to those in larger communities with similar participation rates.

The study also identifies small community members and leaders who express heightened security concerns compared to larger communities. Although rates of antisemitic incidents are similar to those reported in larger communities, members in small communities report their experiences are often dismissed and less likely to believe local law enforcement took antisemitism seriously. The study also found that only 12% of Jews in small communities identified as community leaders, compared with 20% nationally.

Financial Vulnerability Study

In 2025, Jewish Federation of North America with support from Together Ending Need and Jeanette Weinberg Foundation, released a national study examining financial vulnerability among the American Jewish community. Financially vulnerable can be defined as relying on government benefits, struggling to pay bills, or having less than $1,000 in emergency savings. The study found that nearly one in four Jewish adults (23%) are financially vulnerable. An additional 12% reported they were just managing to make ends meet.

The study found that financial hardship affects participation in Jewish communal life despite strong Jewish identity. Among financially vulnerable adults, 57% had no emergency savings, 86% could not cover more than three months of expenses with their savings, and 88% had received Medicaid benefits within the previous year. The findings also identified women, divorced or separated individuals, and those without college degrees as disproportionately affected by financial insecurity.

LGBTQ+ Study

In June 2026, Jewish Federations of North America released its first report examining the experiences and engagement of LGBTQ+ Jews within the Federation system. Based on responses from 136 LGBTQ+ Jews in more than 60 communities across North America, the study found that they are seeking more inclusion. LGBTQ+ Jews are looking for meaningful belonging and sustained connections within Jewish Communal life.

The report found that nearly 90% of respondents identified LGBTQ+ Jewish gatherings as their primary entry point into Jewish life, while 87% noted LGBTQ+ Jewish identity and communities as their strongest area of interest. Relationship-based programming also emerged as a priority, with 78% preferring social gatherings to build personal connections. At the same time, more than half of respondents reported barriers to participation, including accessibility, cost, intersecting identities, and a lack of visible LGBTQ+ leadership. The findings highlight the importance of nurturing belonging through relationship building, accessibility, and leadership development to strengthen long-term engagement.

== Programs ==
National Young Leadership Cabinet

Founded in 1962, the National Young Leadership Cabinet is Jewish Federations of North America's leadership development program for emerging Jewish leaders and philanthropists ages 30–54. Through a five-year curriculum, Cabinet prepares volunteer leaders for roles within their local Federations, JFNA, and the broader Jewish community. Cabinet members are nominated and endorsed by their local Federations and participate in a structured leadership course focused on philanthropy, communal responsibility, advocacy, and global Jewish engagement.

Cabinet members participate in annual leadership retreats, educational seminars, advocacy missions and international study experiences that provide exposure to Jewish Federation's work worldwide. International missions have taken participants to communities across Israel, Europe, Africa, and Latin America. Members also participate in advocacy programs in Washington, D.C.

The program combines national learning with local leadership application. During the first year, participants apply leadership skills within their home Federations while receiving mentorship from experienced Jewish communal leaders. Members engage in year-round learning opportunities, leadership coaching, and networking with peers from communities all over North America. More than 60% of the JFNA Board members are Cabinet alumni.

Today, Cabinet includes more than 500 active members representing dozens of Jewish communities across North America. Cabinet has a network of more than 4,000 alumni.

Center on Aging, Trauma, and Holocaust Survivor Care

The Center on Aging, Trauma, and Holocaust Survivor Care promotes person-centered trauma-informed (PCTI) care for Holocaust survivors, older adults with a history of trauma and their family caregivers. Research suggests that almost 90% of American, older adults have been exposed to at least one traumatic event in their lifetime. Established to address the needs of aging survivors and trauma-affected population, The Center is the national resource for organizations seeking to provide support.

Through workshops, conferences, publications, and free online training programs, the Center equips professionals and volunteers with the tools needed to better understand the long-term effects of trauma on aging, health, and caregiving. These educational resources have been used by over 26,000 professional service providers.

The Center also administers grant programs that support nonprofit organizations to provide services to Holocaust survivors and other older adults impacted by trauma. In addition to financial support, participating organizations receive technical assistance and training. The Center has impacted more than 50,000 Holocaust survivors, 26,000 older adults suffering with trauma, and supported over 10,000 family caregivers.

Student to Student

Student to Student (STS) is a peer-to-peer educational initiative supported by Jewish Federations of North America in partnership with Be The Narrative that trains Jewish High School students to be ambassadors for their communities. Through classroom presentations, Jewish teens share their personal experiences, traditions, and identities with non-Jewish peers to encourage understanding, combat stereotypes, and build interfaith relationships. In addition to educating others about Jewish life, the program helps teens develop leadership, public speaking, and communication skills while strengthening their own Jewish identity.

Since its beginning in St. Louis in 1992, Student to Student has expanded to more than 40 communities across North America. Over the past year, approximately 700 Jewish teens delivered more than 680 presentations in 216 schools, reaching over 28,500 students and hundreds of educators. Survey data found that 84% of participating students took additional steps to learn more about Judaism or shared what they learning with others. 78% of educators reported that the program helped counter antisemitism in their schools.

Frontline Initiative

In October 2026, JFNA announced that it would hire 100 people for advocacy and community relations as part of an initiative to fight growing antisemitism. As part of JFNA's Frontline Initiative, the roles will focus on local and state advocacy, K–12 and higher education, and interfaith and intergroup partnerships to fight anti-Jewish hate in North America, which has increased during Israel's war in Gaza following the Hamas-led Oct. 7 attacks in Israel that killed approximately 1,200 people.

== Structure ==
Each federation within JFNA is autonomous from federations of other cities and they tend to focus on local concerns. The federations typically have elected boards or trustees that are accountable to the community, paid staff, and volunteer leadership. Originally, the federations operated on volunteer only basis, but quickly turned to professional staffs. They engage in centralized planning for the needs of the local community, and may provide centralized administrative services for their constituent agencies.

Depending on the size of the community, the federation may provide services directly or fund another agency to provide that function. For example, the federation may have a local as an arm or function, if not provided by a separate federation funded agency.

=== Community Relations Council ===
Most local federations are either affiliated with or host a local Jewish Community Relations Council, which deals with local antisemitism, Holocaust education support, and inter-religious or interracial community functions and organizations._{70-71} Depending on local preferences, the JCRC may be volunteer or professionally-staffed, and may have varying degrees of structural separateness from the federation itself.

== Fundraising and spending ==
Federations raise money for central, local campaigns that support the organizations of the entire local Jewish community. Historically, with a number of Jewish institutions running their own fundraising campaigns, Jewish communities leadership felt it could be more efficient to instead have a single campaign that could centralize gift-making.

Between 30 and 50 percent of Jewish households in the United States typically contribute to their local federation. Jfeds also raise money for the national United Jewish Appeal campaign that sends funding overseas and may combine the Federation annual and United Jewish Appeal into one campaign. The federations or the federation system may hold special campaigns in addition to the annual campaign.

Federation spending and efforts have adapted as the need for particular social services has changed—for example, from Jewish orphanage work in the early twentieth century to retirement homes in the late twentieth century.

More than half of all funds raised by federations are earmarked for various local Jewish social service agencies, with the largest single allocation to Jewish education, typically constituting 25 percent. After education, Jewish community centers, the local Jewish family and child services, homes for the aged, and campus Hillels are the next largest recipients of financial support. In some communities were the federation does not provide the service, a Jewish vocational service agency is usually funded to provide job related services.

As an example, in 2008, the Overnight Camp Incentive Program provided grant money to 18 campers to attend Pinemere Camp. The program is a joint project of the Jewish Federation of Greater Philadelphia, the Foundation for Jewish Camp, and the Neubauer Family Foundation. The program provided grants of $750 to $1,250. The majority of the Pinemere campers who received grants chose to return the following summer.

=== Super Sunday ===
A significant feature of the annual federation campaign is the annual Super Sunday, a day designated for community-wide phone banking, seeking contributions from members of the community. The fundraising event is held by many of the 155 Jewish federations located in North America. The phone-a-thons are typically expected to raise most of the budget for the federation and its constituent agencies and organizations.

The name "Super Sunday" is borrowed from the American football usage for the day on which the Super Bowl is played. Impliedly, the Super Sunday phone-a-thon is also the major annual event for the federation, as Super Sundays play a large role in the life of the local Jewish community. The results of a Super Sunday can have a major impact on the contribution intake of any particular federation, and thus can have a domino effect on the various entities that receive federation funding, such as social service organization, classes, scholarships, and family care. The success of Super Sunday holds substantial weight, as it directly influences the contribution intake for the federation.

Some of the largest and most visible Super Sundays occur in the major urban areas with large Jewish concentrations, such as Los Angeles and New York, but also through smaller federations, such as Seattle and Minneapolis. Super Sunday was created by Jerry Dick of the Jewish Federation of Greater Washington in 1980.

== Role in community ==
Jewish federations can wield a sizable degree of influence in the Jewish communities in which they are located. Many of the local federations hold annual fundraising drives that are expected to raise most of the next year's budgeting for many community programs. In return, in many communities the agencies which receive funding from the federation agree not to engage in major fundraising for themselves for a number of months often called the "primacy period" when the local federation's fundraising has primacy. Decisions made by the local federations can have a great impact on the community, including the opening or closing of programs, staff hirings and firings, and land purchases and sales.

== Jewish family and child services ==
Jewish Family and Child Services (JFCS) is usually the general social service agency supported by the local federation. A JFCS may have other names like Jewish Family Services, Jewish Family & Children's Service, Jewish Family & Community Services, Jewish Community Services, or other derivatives. Similar to the federation, a JFCS may be a part of the federation, the only Jewish service agency in a community, or may be several separate agencies.

== JFNA activities ==
=== Walk With Israel ===
The UJA Federation of Greater Toronto organizes the annual Walk With Israel, a pro-Israel fundraising and solidarity two-to-three-mile walk first held in May 1970 as the "Walk for Jewish Survival". The original event was a 22-mile walk that raised funds for the UJA-Israel Special Fund, and UJA later described it as the largest single community event in Jewish Toronto, with proceeds designated for Israel. In the 2020s, the walk drew renewed media attention because of large attendance, pro-Palestinian counter-protests, and heightened police security; in 2026, organizers estimated more than 60,000 participants, while Toronto police reported six arrests at or near the event. The Toronto walk is the largest pro-Israel event in North America, larger than New York's Israel Day Parade, and is the largest annual pro-Israel rally outside of Israel.

=== National Jewish Population Survey ===
JFNA administered the National Jewish Population Survey (NJPS), a decennial census of the Jewish community in the United States. The 1990 survey indicated that the intermarriage rate was 52 percent, a claim questioned by demographers. The 2000-2001 edition of the NJPS used a different survey method, cost $6 million, and the data was lost. JFNA did not fund the 2010 survey due to re-prioritizing given decreased revenue given its limited direct benefits to local federations.

JFNA helps direct hundreds of millions of dollars annually for Jewish programming and organizes an annual conference that is one of the largest gatherings of Jewish professionals in the world.

=== Jewish DataBank ===
In 1986, then-CJF established the North American Jewish DataBank in conjunction with City University of New York's Center for Jewish Studies. The Databank serves as a repository and standardizes research methods for academic studies and surveys about Jewish community. In 2004, the DataBank moved to the University of Connecticut under the direction of scholar Arnold Dashefsky.
