= 2022 Colleyville synagogue hostage crisis =

Hostage incident in Texas, US

Colleyville synagogue hostage crisis
- Location: 32°53′51″N 97°9′18″W; Congregation Beth Israel, Colleyville, Texas, United States
- Date: January 15, 2022; 4 years ago 10:41 am – 9:22 pm (CST)
- Attack type: Hostage-taking
- Weapon: Taurus G2C handgun
- Deaths: 1 (the perpetrator)
- Victims: 4 (all hostages freed)
- Perpetrator: Malik Faisal Akram
- Motive: Effort to release Aafia Siddiqui from prison; Antisemitism; Islamic terrorism

The Colleyville synagogue hostage crisis was a 2022 incident where a 44-year-old man armed with a pistol took four people hostage in a synagogue in Colleyville, Texas, United States.

The incident occurred on January 15, 2022, when Malik Akram, a British Pakistani man, entered the Congregation Beth Israel synagogue during a Sabbath service. Hostage negotiations ensued, during which Akram demanded the release of Aafia Siddiqui, a Pakistani national and alleged al-Qaeda operative imprisoned in nearby Fort Worth for attempted murder and other crimes. He released one hostage after six hours, and the remaining three hostages escaped eleven hours into the standoff. Tactical officers from the FBI Hostage Rescue Team subsequently entered the synagogue and fatally shot Akram.

== Background ==
=== Congregation Beth Israel ===
Congregation Beth Israel is a Reform Jewish synagogue in Colleyville, Texas, a suburb 15 miles (24 km) northeast of Fort Worth in the Dallas–Fort Worth metroplex. The congregation was initially a chavurah established in 1999 with 25 families; a religious school with 75 children was founded shortly afterward. After in its early years holding its services at rented facilities, Congregation Beth Israel opened a synagogue of its own in 2004. The congregation is smaller than other Jewish congregations in the area; at the time of the incident, the congregation had around 140 members. The synagogue's rabbi at the time of the crisis was Charlie Cytron-Walker, originally from Lansing, Michigan. He became the congregation's rabbi in 2006, and he is known for his work in interfaith relations. Cytron-Walker was already set to leave the congregation in June 2022 when the incident occurred.

Clergy and staff at the synagogue had taken courses for a number of years through the FBI, the Anti-Defamation League, the Colleyville Police Department, and Secure Community Network in order to prepare for the possibility of an intruder. Cytron-Walker credited the information learned in the courses with saving the hostages' lives.

=== Perpetrator ===
Malik Faisal Akram (March 3, 1977 – January 15, 2022) was a 44-year-old British citizen originally from Blackburn, Lancashire, in North West England. He was born to a family originally from Jhelum, a city in Pakistani Punjab. As a youth, Akram was expelled from school for getting involved in fights, and his parents subsequently sent him to a military school in Pakistan. During negotiations, he said that he had six children. A brother of Akram said that he had undiagnosed mental health issues that were well known to the Blackburn community, and that three months prior to the incident, a younger sibling had died. He also said that Akram did not harbor any hatred towards Jewish people in the past and that "religious nuts" had radicalized his brother in 2003.

In September 2001, Akram was banned from Blackburn's magistrates' court for threatening staff on a number of occasions, including on days when he was not due in court. His final threat was made on September 12, when he said that he wished that a court usher had been killed in the 9/11 terrorist attacks the day before. Akram had a criminal record in the UK, which included a drug deal-linked assault, violent disorder, and driving offenses. A community organizer in Blackburn said that Akram served a custodial sentence in England.

The Times of London reported that Akram had been referred to Prevent, a voluntary British counter-radicalization program, in 2016 and 2019 amid concerns about his views; it was unclear whether Akram took part in the program. After he spent six months in Pakistan in 2020, Akram was investigated by the MI5, the British security service. He was on a watchlist as a "subject of interest" in a four-week MI5 "short lead investigation"; by 2021, he was moved to a "former subject of interest" list, having been no longer considered a terrorist threat. Akram was not on any U.S. watchlists.

=== Aafia Siddiqui ===
Aafia Siddiqui is a Pakistani national and alleged al-Qaeda operative, formerly dubbed "Lady al-Qaeda". She is currently being held in the Federal Medical Center, Carswell, a women's federal prison in Fort Worth, while serving an 86-year sentence for attempted murder and other crimes. After being on the U.S. most wanted fugitives list for five years, Siddiqui was arrested in 2008 by Afghan police in Afghanistan, carrying handwritten notes plotting a "mass casualty attack", along with explosive and poisonous substances, and a list of possible targets in New York City and methods.

According to U.S. authorities, in 2001, Siddiqui married Ammar al-Baluchi, an accused al-Qaeda member and the nephew of Khalid Sheikh Mohammed, who was the ringleader of the September 11 attacks. Siddiqui was convicted in a jury trial in a U.S. federal court in 2010 of attempting to kill a U.S. Army captain while in Afghan custody; armed assault; using and carrying a firearm; and three counts of assault on U.S. officers and employees.

For years, Siddiqui has been a cause célèbre within Islamist and Islamic extremist militant circles and in Pakistan, where she is depicted as a martyr and heroine. The Islamist terrorist groups al-Qaeda, al-Qaeda in the Arabian Peninsula, and the Islamic State (Daesh) have all unsuccessfully tried to negotiate Siddiqui's release at various times, as a condition for them releasing foreign hostages. The Islamic State sought to trade kidnapped American journalist James Foley for her; after the U.S. government declined, the Islamic State beheaded Foley.

During her trial, Siddiqui made various antisemitic statements and asked that there not be any Jewish people on the jury, going so far as to demand genetic tests on jurors at one point, to determine if they were Jewish. She later claimed she was not against all "Israeli Americans". After her sentencing by the U.S. court for a crime against Americans, she said: "This is a verdict coming from Israel and not from America. That's where the anger belongs."

According to The Daily Telegraph, Congregation Beth Israel is the nearest synagogue to where Siddiqui is being held.

== Events ==
=== Akram enters the U.S. and acquires weapon ===
Akram entered the U.S. from the United Kingdom on December 27, 2021, two weeks prior to the incident, at John F. Kennedy International Airport in New York City, listing a Queens hotel as his local address on a customs form. He was checked against law enforcement databases and did not raise any red flags. Investigators believe that Akram lied on his tourist visa waiver, which requires applicants to disclose criminal records.

Akram then traveled to Dallas, Texas, apparently by air on December 31, 2021, and intermittently stayed in at least two local homeless shelters between January 2 and 11. While there, he was described, by an official at one of the shelters, as quiet and not being there long enough to build any relationships. On video dated January 2, Akram was captured being dropped off at one of the shelters by an unknown individual who stayed with him at the shelter for fifteen minutes and hugged him before departing. Investigators determined that Akram purchased a Taurus G2C handgun on the street from someone he met at the Union Gospel Mission Dallas, one of the shelters where he stayed. The handgun's last legal sale was recorded in early 2020, and it was reported stolen later that year.

On January 5, Akram arrived at the Islamic Center of Irving to pray. He became belligerent when he was told he could not sleep inside the building due to city ordinances and mosque policy, and he was kicked out of the mosque. Mosque officials described him as behaving erratically, but without any indication of potential violence. Akram returned the next day to apologize, and the mosque allowed him to pray inside; officials said that he was like a different person on that day and that his demeanor was a "flip flop in the behavior in the extremes". His movements on January 12–15 were unclear.

=== Hostage crisis begins ===
On the morning of January 15, 2022, Akram visited a Starbucks located less than a mile away from the Congregation Beth Israel, then he traveled to the synagogue by bicycle. At around 10:00 a.m., Akram entered Beth Israel by knocking on a locked glass door and posing as a homeless man seeking shelter. He was welcomed inside by Rabbi Charlie Cytron-Walker, who made him a cup of hot tea. Cytron-Walker said after his rescue that he was not initially suspicious of Akram, but he was "curious" after some of his story did not add up. Cytron-Walker introduced Akram to Jeffrey R Cohen, the vice president on the synagogue's board of trustees, who said Akram was calm and on the phone at the time.

During Sabbath prayer, Cytron-Walker turned his back on the congregation to pray towards Jerusalem, and he then heard a click, which turned out to be Akram's pistol. A yelling Akram then began taking hostages in the synagogue. A total of four hostages, including Cytron-Walker and Cohen, were held captive. As he was being taken hostage, Jeffrey R Cohen secretly dialed 9-1-1 and placed his phone down on its screen before moving as commanded. The Colleyville Police Department first received a 9-1-1 call reporting the situation at 10:41 a.m., and an officer responded to the scene minutes later.

A report that hostages had been taken at Congregation Beth Israel was made public at around 11:30 a.m. via a tweet from the Colleyville Police Department, which said a SWAT team was on the scene. Police were later assisted by the Federal Bureau of Investigation (FBI) and the Texas Department of Public Safety. Law enforcement evacuated the neighborhood in the vicinity of the crime scene. Ultimately, more than 200 local, state, and federal law enforcement officers and agents responded to the scene, including a team of around 70 FBI hostage negotiators and rescue operatives who flew in from Quantico, Virginia.

A livestream of the synagogue's services on its Facebook page streamed the ongoing situation, including the forceful taking of hostages. In the livestream, Akram could be heard speaking to authorities, who attempted to negotiate with him. At one point, Akram claimed (apparently falsely) to have a bomb. The livestream also streamed Akram saying that he had flown to the city where Siddiqui was imprisoned with the intent of taking hostages. He also said that he chose to take hostages in a synagogue because the U.S. "only cares about Jewish lives" and because "Jews control the world. Jews control the media. Jews control the banks."

=== Negotiations ===
During the incident, Akram demanded that Siddiqui be released from prison and referred to her as "sister". He believed Siddiqui was "framed". Siddiqui's lawyer said her client had no involvement in the incident. One of Akram's brothers was involved in the negotiations, speaking to his brother from a Blackburn Greenbank police station, having been taken to its incident room to liaise with the FBI and negotiators. He later wrote that their whole family condemned Akram's actions. The brother urged him to release the hostages and surrender to police, but Akram said that he came to the synagogue with the intent to die, telling his brother that he intended to "go down as a martyr" and would be "coming back in a body bag".

A number of local faith leaders rushed to the synagogue to provide support, including prominent American Muslim imam and activist, Omar Suleiman, who offered to assist with hostage negotiations.

During negotiations, Akram was emotionally unstable and agitated. He ranted against the U.S., Israel, and Jews; used antisemitic and anti-Israeli epithets; delivered a rambling condemnation of U.S. military conflicts overseas; and occasionally spoke in different languages. He boasted about his desire for martyrdom and addressed fellow jihadists. He threatened to kill the hostages, saying, "If anyone tries to enter this building, I'm telling you... everyone will die," and "I'm going to die. Don't cry about me...." At one point, Akram asked each hostage how many children they had, and then said to the hostage negotiator: "Do you want to have seven children lose their parent?" However, he also said "I don't wanna hurt 'em, yeah" in reference to the hostages. He allowed the hostages to call their families, and Jeffrey R Cohen was able to write a post on Facebook.

Akram said he would shoot hostages unless he spoke to a Jewish leader in New York. Just after 12:00 p.m., Akram called Central Synagogue in New York City and twice demanded to speak to Senior Rabbi Angela Buchdahl. While on the phone with Buchdahl, he said that he had a bomb, and asked her to use her position of influence to secure Siddiqui's release. Buchdahl immediately contacted law enforcement. Authorities suspect Akram chose to call Buchdahl because of her leadership position of a synagogue in New York City, where Siddiqui was convicted. In her 2005 memoir, Rabbi Buchdahl stated Akram told her he called her because he saw a picture of her at the White House. <how to cite from a book?>

At around 12:30 p.m., the FBI took over hostage negotiations. At about 2:00 p.m., Facebook cut the livestream feed, but police were able to access the synagogue's closed-circuit television system and view the events in real time. Shortly after 5:00 p.m., Akram released one of the hostages. The man did not need medical attention.

=== Resolution ===
As the standoff reached ten hours, and Siddiqui remained unreleased, the situation became dire. Cytron-Walker said Akram grew "increasingly belligerent and threatening". However, Cytron-Walker, Cohen, and the third remaining hostage saw that Akram was out of position, knew an exit was nearby, and positioned themselves nearby, one by one. Akram then ordered them to get on their knees, and Cytron-Walker got him a cup of juice to drink. As Akram drank, Cytron-Walker yelled at the others to run and threw a chair at Akram while the others fled towards the exit. All three hostages escaped, and no shots were fired by Akram. Video taken outside the synagogue by WFAA just before 9:15 p.m. showed the hostages sprinting out of the building while being followed by Akram, who then withdrew into the building. Cytron-Walker credited security courses he had taken for helping the captives figure out the right moment to flee.

After the hostages fled the building, the FBI Hostage Rescue Team was seen surrounding another part of the synagogue. At around 9:21 p.m., the FBI Hostage Rescue used a stun grenade to attempt to disorient Akram. Electricity was cut to the synagogue, and agents breached the building at around 9:22 p.m. Within seconds, the agents shot Akram multiple times, killing him.

At around 9:30 p.m., after an 11-hour standoff, all remaining hostages were confirmed to have been recovered unharmed. After the synagogue was secured, the building was swept by the FBI's Evidence Response Team and bomb technicians. No explosives aside from police entry tools were found at the scene.

== Investigation ==
The FBI's North Texas Joint Terrorism Task Force coordinated the investigation. Immediately after the incident, an official initially said Akram's demands were "specifically focused on issues not connected to the Jewish community". The statement attracted criticism for downplaying antisemitism as a possible motive, given Akram's selection of a synagogue as a target, and Siddiqui's antisemitic beliefs. In an official FBI statement made on January 17, it said the incident was "a terrorism-related matter, in which the Jewish community was targeted". British counterterrorism police are assisting the U.S. authorities. On January 21, the FBI said it was investigating the incident as a "federal hate crime" and an "act of terrorism".

The FBI believes that Akram acted alone, and Matthew DeSarno, the special agent in charge of the FBI's Dallas field office, said there was no indication that the man was part of any broader plan. DeSarno also said the investigation into the incident will have "global" reach, and he confirmed that the FBI Shooting Incident Review Team "will conduct a thorough, factual, and objective investigation of the events". A day after the incident, President Joe Biden said Akram was armed with guns, but his claim of being armed with a bomb was not true. Akram's motive for the hostage-taking was his anger over the U.S. imprisonment of Siddiqui. A U.S. official said that the hostage situation deteriorated in its final hours in part because Akram "became increasingly skeptical that the FBI would accede to his demands to free Siddiqui".

American and British investigators retrieved electronic data about Akram's movements and interests in the days before he came to the synagogue. Over the two weeks leading up to the incident, Akram's Internet search history revealed that he looked up information about influential rabbis, Siddiqui, gun stores, and pawnshops.

=== Related arrests ===
The day after the incident, Akram's two teenage sons were apprehended in south Manchester, North West England, by officers from Counter Terror Policing North West. They were subsequently released without being charged. On January 20, two men were arrested in Manchester and Birmingham, West Midlands, as part of the investigation into the Colleyville incident. They were later released with no further action as of January 26. On January 25, two additional men were taken into custody in Manchester as part of the investigation. On January 27, one of them was released without being charged.

On January 26, a 32-year-old Texas man was arrested for being a felon in possession of a firearm; he was alleged to have sold Akram the Taurus G2C handgun used in the incident. The sale reportedly occurred on January 13, and the man had exchanged several phone calls with Akram within the two preceding days. The man reportedly told authorities that he believed Akram wanted to use the gun to intimidate someone who owed him money.

== Reactions ==
Cytron-Walker expressed gratitude and thanks "for all of the vigils and prayers and love and support, all of the law enforcement and first responders who cared for us, all of the security training that helped save us."

Officials in the White House monitored the situation; President Joe Biden called it "an act of terror" and said, "We will stand against antisemitism and against the rise of extremism in this country." British Foreign Secretary Liz Truss condemned the incident, calling it an antisemitic act of terror. Livia Link, the Israeli Consul General in Houston, Texas, attended the scene, and the Israeli government established contact with U.S. law enforcement regarding the situation.

The Washington Post reported that the incident had shaken Jewish communities in the U.S. and around the world, and Haaretz reported that Jewish leaders condemned an FBI official's initial suggestion that the incident may not have been antisemitic. Rabbi Shmuley Boteach, recounting the series of recent attacks on American Jews, said a "bullseye is being drawn on the backs of Jews in the United States". Many synagogues and other Jewish institutions increased security measures. Jewish leaders also called for stronger turnout at synagogues as a show of defiance against antisemitism.

Many Muslim community leaders and Islamic organizations in Texas condemned the actions of the hostage-taker and expressed their support for the synagogue in the wake of the hostage incident. The Council on American–Islamic Relations, which has called for the release of Siddiqui and asserted that she is innocent, condemned the incident as "an act of pure evil" and expressed support and prayers with the people being held hostage in the synagogue. The attorney who represents Siddiqui said she had "absolutely no involvement with [the hostage crisis]" and that they condemn the incident. The Muslim community of Blackburn, the hometown of Akram, expressed their solidarity with the Jewish community and stated, "our sympathy goes out to the hostages and the rest of the Jewish community".

During the aftermath of the hostage-taking, the Anti-Defamation League released a report documenting conspiracy theories and antisemitic responses to the crisis, including false claims that the incident was an inside job by the U.S. government. Supporters of the American radical right political conspiracy theory movement QAnon termed the survivors "crisis actors" and the incident a false flag operation. The document also criticized Islamophobic reactions to the incident, such as the use of the slur Paki. Far-right political commentator Gavin McInnes posted that "maybe we should consider cutting Islam out of our 'interfaith' communities", which the ADL denounced as Islamophobic. The ADL issued resources to counter hate and misinformation.

=== Documentary film ===
Dani Menkin, an Israeli Academy Award–winning writer and director, commenced production of Colleyville, a documentary film about the hostage crisis, released on June 23, 2024 in the United States. The film includes security footage from inside the synagogue captured during the incident.

== See also ==
- Antisemitism in the United Kingdom
- History of antisemitism in the United States
- Hypercacher kosher supermarket siege
- Los Angeles Jewish Community Center shooting
- 2019 Jersey City shooting
- Monsey Hanukkah stabbing
- Munich massacre
- History of the Jews in Dallas
- List of antisemitic incidents in the United States
