= Charlie Cytron-Walker =

American rabbi

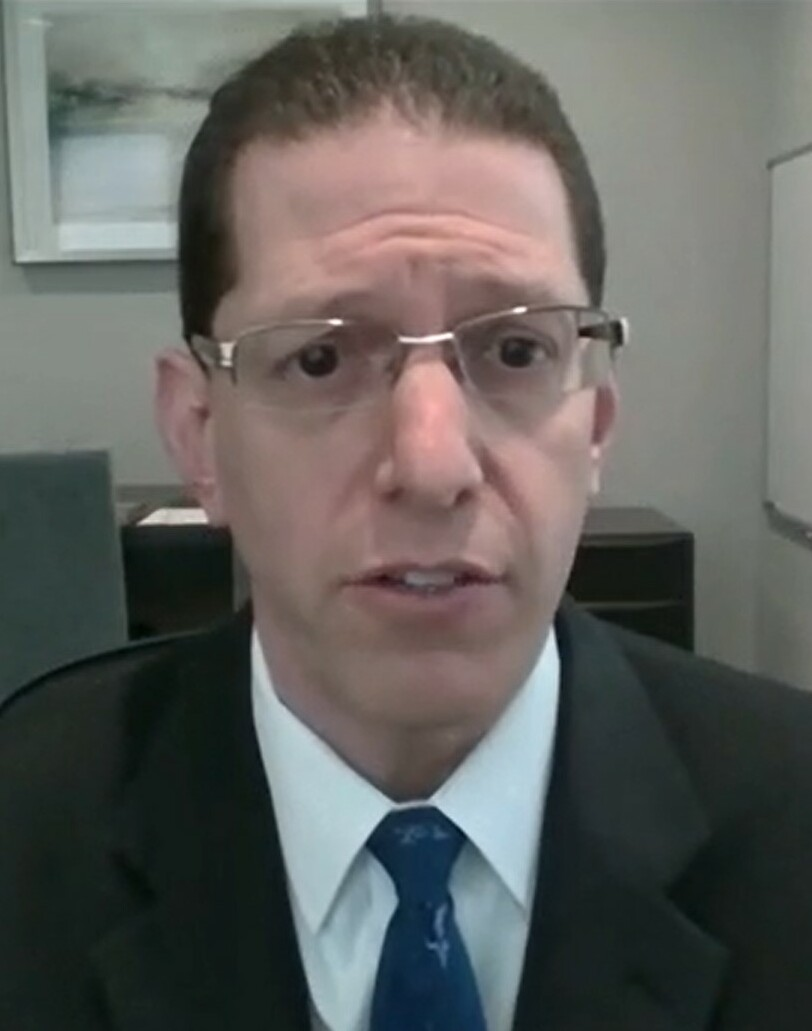
- Cytron-Walker in 2022
- Born: Charlie Walker; Lansing, Michigan, U.S.
- Education: University of Michigan; Hebrew Union College – Jewish Institute of Religion
- Occupation: Rabbi
- Years active: 2006–present
- Children: 2

Charlie Cytron-Walker (né Walker) is an American rabbi. As of 2022, he is the rabbi at Temple Emanuel in Winston-Salem, North Carolina. He is a former rabbi at Congregation Beth Israel in Colleyville, Texas and was held captive during the Colleyville synagogue hostage crisis.

== Early life and education ==
Cytron-Walker was born in Lansing, Michigan. He earned a B.A. in social sciences in May 1998 from the University of Michigan. From 1989 to 1999, Cytron-Walker was a senior ambassador for Focus: HOPE in Detroit. He was the assistant director of the Amherst Survival Center from 1999 to 2001. While there, he coordinated volunteers for the soup kitchen and store, counseled, and worked as an event organizer. Cytron-Walker completed an M.A. in Hebrew Letters at the Hebrew Union College – Jewish Institute of Religion in Cincinnati in June 2005. He interned at the Temple Sholom in Cincinnati from the fall of 2004 to the spring of 2006. Cytron-Walker was ordained as a rabbi in May 2006.

== Career ==
Cytron-Walker follows Reform Judaism. In 2006, he became the first full-time rabbi at Congregation Beth Israel synagogue in Colleyville, Texas. This was his first rabbinical appointment. A proponent of interfaith dialogue, in 2009, he participated in an exchange with a priest from a local Catholic congregation. Cytron-Walker also taught at the congregation's religious school.

While the Colleyville synagogue permitted concealed-carry permits, Cytron-Walker stated that, "...we don't feel that open carry should be part of a synagogue service."

On January 15, 2022, Cytron-Walker and three others were held hostage by Malik Akram for eleven hours during the Colleyville synagogue hostage crisis.

As the standoff reached ten hours, the situation became dire. Cytron-Walker said Akram grew "increasingly belligerent and threatening." However, Cytron-Walker and the remaining hostages saw that Akram was out of position, knew an exit was nearby, and positioned themselves nearby, one by one. Akram then ordered them to get on their knees, and Cytron-Walker got him a cup of juice to drink. As Akram drank, Cytron-Walker yelled at the others to run and threw a chair at Akram while the others fled towards the exit. All three hostages escaped, and no shots were fired by Akram.

Cytron-Walker had taken courses for a number of years through the FBI, the Anti-Defamation League, the Colleyville Police Department, and Secure Community Network in order to prepare for the possibility of an intruder. Cytron-Walker credited the information learned in the courses with saving the hostages' lives.

In the fall of 2021, the board of the congregation suggested to not renew Cytron-Walker's contract, although he had considerable support from the congregants. Charlie Cytron-Walker had been with the congregation for more than 17 years. He later resigned.

In February 2022, Temple Emanuel congregants in Winston-Salem, North Carolina voted to hire Cytron-Walker.

== Personal life ==
Cytron-Walker is married to the former Adena Cytron, a diversity management professional, with whom he has two daughters. Upon marriage, they adopted a hyphenated name. She is a 1998 graduate of the University of Michigan.
