= 2019 Monsey Hanukkah stabbing =

Stabbing attack in New York, U.S.

Monsey Hanukkah stabbing
- Location: 41.1431514°N 74.0830215°W; Forshay Road, Monsey, New York, U.S.
- Date: December 28, 2019 c. 10:00 p.m. (EST; UTC−05:00)
- Target: People at a Hanukkah party
- Attack type: Mass stabbing, hate crime
- Weapon: Machete
- Deaths: 1 (Rabbi Josef Neumann) (Note: Neumann initially survived the stabbing, but later died from injuries in March 2020.)
- Injuries: 4
- Motive: Antisemitism
- Accused: Grafton E. Thomas
- Charges: 1 count of second-degree murder (Note: Thomas was previously charged with 5 counts of attempted murder.); 4 counts of attempted murder; 1 count of first-degree burglary

On the night of December 28, 2019, the seventh night of the Jewish holiday of Hanukkah, a masked man wielding a large knife or machete invaded the home of a Hasidic rabbi in Monsey, New York, United States, where a Hanukkah party was underway, and began stabbing the guests. Five men were wounded, two of whom were hospitalized in critical condition. Party guests forced the assailant to flee by wielding chairs and a small table. Three months after the stabbing, the most severely injured victim, Rabbi Josef Neumann, aged 72, died of his wounds.

The suspect was captured shortly after the attack. He had a long history of serious mental illness and had been diagnosed with paranoid schizophrenia the year before the attack. He was charged in state court with five counts of attempted murder and one count of first-degree burglary, and in federal court on federal hate crime charges. A judge ruled him incompetent to stand trial on both the state and the federal charges.

== Background ==
Rockland County, which includes the hamlet of Monsey, is noted for having the largest percentage of Jewish residents per capita of any U.S. county — a total of 31.4 percent (90,000). Additionally, large and growing Hasidic communities are based in Monsey, New Square, and Kiryas Joel.

The incident was the second stabbing attack in Monsey's Jewish community in as many months; a 30-year-old Orthodox Jewish man was stabbed several times by an unidentified assailant while he was on his way to pre-dawn prayers (vasikin) in late November, and underwent surgery.

== Attack ==
The incident took place in the home of Rabbi Chaim Rottenberg of the Koson Hasidic dynasty, where almost 100 people had gathered to watch the rabbi light the candles and to celebrate a Hanukkah party, on the seventh night of Hanukkah, December 28, 2019. Around 10 p.m., a man with his face covered by a scarf entered the house and immediately began stabbing bystanders with a large knife or machete. Five people, all Hasidic Jews, were injured; one suffered a skull fracture and was unconscious and in critical condition. The 72-year-old man was in a coma for 59 days, but died in March 2020. Rottenberg's son was also among the injured. Guests struck back, hitting the attacker with chairs and a small table. The attack lasted no more than two minutes.

The suspect then fled the house and attempted to enter the synagogue next door, Congregation Netzach Yisroel, also headed by Rottenberg, but the doors had been locked to prevent his entry.

== Capture of suspect ==
The suspect then fled the scene in a car. A witness provided police with the license plate number of the getaway car. At 11:45 p.m., a license plate reader on the George Washington Bridge captured the license plate of the car as it entered New York City; New York City police stopped the car in Harlem and arrested the driver without incident after midnight. According to Rockland County Senior District Attorney Michael Dugandzic, police found the suspect with blood on his clothes and smelling "strongly" of bleach. The New York police handed the suspect over to Ramapo police, who transported him back to Monsey to be arraigned.

== Suspect ==
The suspect, 37-year-old Grafton E. Thomas, lived in Greenwood Lake northwest of Monsey.

=== Previous arrests ===
Thomas has been arrested at least seven times since 2001, on charges which include assault, resisting arrest, killing or injuring a police animal, driving under the influence, possessing controlled substances, and menacing a police or peace officer. He was jailed briefly in 2013 for possession of a controlled substance. Another previous arrest was for punching a police horse. Thomas was further charged in 2018 for weapon possession, endangerment, and menacing a policeman.

=== Antisemitic views and statements ===
Investigators found handwritten journals expressing antisemitic views, including material about Adolf Hitler, "Nazi culture", and drawings of a Star of David and of a swastika among Thomas's possessions. Authorities stated that his journals also included what appeared to be a reference to a fringe religious movement, Black Hebrew Israelites, which the Anti-Defamation League and Southern Poverty Law Center have identified as linked to antisemitism, with Thomas stating that "Hebrew Israelites" have taken from "ebinoid Israelites". On the Saturday before the attack, the suspect's mobile browser was used to access an article titled "New York City Increases Police Presence in Jewish Neighborhoods". In recent weeks, Thomas had searched online for phrases such as "Why did Hitler hate the Jews" multiple times, as well as "German Jewish Temples near me". He had also searched for "Zionist Temples" in Elizabeth, New Jersey, and in Staten Island, New York.

Thomas is also under investigation on suspicion of having committed a previous stabbing attack on an Orthodox Jewish man on his way to the early prayer service at 5:30 a.m. on November 20, 2019; the victim was critically injured.

Thomas' lawyer issued a statement on behalf of his family asserting Thomas did not belong to any hate groups.

=== Mental disorder ===
Thomas had a long history of serious mental illness; his condition had been deteriorating for at least a decade. He had been diagnosed with paranoid schizophrenia in 2018, when he underwent a psychiatric evaluation at the Orange County Medical Center after being arrested for confronting a police officer with a knife. In April 2019, eight months before the attack, Thomas was hospitalized for several days for psychiatric disorders.

== Criminal charges ==
Thomas was arraigned on December 29, 2019, in New York state court in Rockland County to five counts of attempted murder and one count of first-degree burglary; he pleaded not guilty. Bail was set at $5 million. In March 2020, after 72-year-old Rabbi Josef Neumann died from his wounds three months after the attack, the Rockland County District Attorney announced that it would seek a grand jury indictment against Thomas for second-degree murder.

Separately, on December 30, 2019, the U.S. Attorney's Office for the Southern District of New York filed a criminal complaint charging Thomas with five counts of "obstruction of free exercise of religious beliefs involving an attempt to kill and use of a dangerous weapon, and resulting in bodily injury" (a federal hate crime). He was indicted by a federal grand jury on the charge.

=== Ruled incompetent to stand trial ===
In April 2020, a federal judge ruled that Thomas was incompetent to stand trial on federal charges and ordered him to be hospitalized in a mental facility. Since that time, Thomas has mostly been detained at the Medical Center for Federal Prisoners in Springfield, Missouri, although he has been transferred to a New York facility ahead of court proceedings there. A new examination in 2021 found that Thomas was still incompetent.

In January 2022, a state judge also ruled that Thomas was incompetent to stand trial on the state charges.

On January 17, 2024, Rockland County Judge Kevin Russo ordered Thomas to be held at Mid-Hudson Forensic Psychiatric Center for up to two additional years. While Thomas is receiving psychiatric treatment, his trial remains postponed.

== Political impact ==
The crime has sparked a discussion about the impact of recent New York State bail reforms which require courts to release individuals on non-monetary conditions for almost all misdemeanors and non-violent felonies, as well as burglary and robbery in the second degree, regardless of whether the crime is a hate crime. Thomas had previously been released from police custody after being arrested for a number of minor violent crimes.

== Reactions ==
- New York Governor Andrew M. Cuomo described the attack as an "act of domestic terrorism" and ordered the New York state police's hate crimes task force to launch an investigation. Attorney General of New York Letitia James pledged "zero tolerance for acts of hate of any kind" and expressed her support for the Jewish community. United States Senator from New York Chuck Schumer called the attack "an act of pure evil" and added in a tweet that "[t]he cascade in anti-Semitic attacks is outrageous throughout metropolitan New York and America, and must not be tolerated".
- President Donald Trump tweeted this message the following day: "The anti-Semitic attack in Monsey, New York, on the 7th night of Hanukkah last night is horrific. We must all come together to fight, confront, and eradicate the evil scourge of anti-Semitism. Melania and I wish the victims a quick and full recovery".
- Israeli Prime Minister Benjamin Netanyahu stated: "Israel unequivocally condemns the recent expressions of anti-Semitism and the vicious attack in the middle of Hanukkah on the rabbi's house in Monsey, New York. We send our wishes of recovery to the wounded. We will cooperate in every way with the local authorities in order to defeat this phenomenon. We offer our help to each and every state". President of Israel Reuven Rivlin also expressed his "shock and outrage", adding: "The rise of anti-Semitism is not just a Jewish problem, and certainly not just the State of Israel's problem".
- Four New York Jewish politicians – New York city councilmen Chaim Deutsch and Kalman Yeger, New York state senator Simcha Felder, and New York State Assemblyman Simcha Eichenstein – wrote a letter to New York Governor Cuomo asking him to assign a special prosecutor for antisemitic hate crimes and to send the New York National Guard to protect Orthodox Jewish neighborhoods, claiming that "it is no longer safe to be identifiable Orthodox in the State of New York".

== See also ==
- Antisemitism in the United States in the 21st-century
- 2019 Jersey City shooting
- 2022 Colleyville synagogue hostage crisis
