= List of attacks on Jewish institutions =

The history of antisemitism, often called "the longest hatred", has included many violent attacks on Jewish institutions such as synagogues, Jewish Community Centers, and the headquarters of Jewish organizations.

== Attacks ==
Date	Target	Location	Perpetrator (motive)	Details
11 April 1956	Shafrir synagogue	Kfar Chabad, Israel	Palestinian fedayeen (Palestinian nationalism)	Shafrir synagogue shooting: As part of the Palestinian Fedayeen insurgency, three Palestinian militants who crossed into Israel from Egypt attacked the study hall of a synagogue while it was full of children and teenagers, killing 6 people, including 5 children.
September 1958	Malakhovka synagogue	Malakhovka, Moscow Oblast, Soviet Union	Unknown	One elderly woman killed.
25 March 1960	Congregation Beth Israel (Gadsden, Alabama)	Gadsden, Alabama, United States	Jerry Hunt (white supremacy and antisemitism)	Congregation Beth Israel attack: About 180 members were attending a Friday evening service to dedicate the new Zemurray Social Hall, and led by then-rabbi Saul Rubin and Rev. John Speaks and Dr. Franklin Denson of First Methodist Church, when 16‑year-old neo-Nazi firebombed the synagogue. He then non-fatally shot two synagogue members who went outside to investigate.
11 January 1969	Congregation Shaare Tikvah	Temple Hills, Maryland, United States	David Marness (possibly right-wing extremism linked to the Minutemen organization)	A bomb planted in the rear wall of Congregation Shaare Tikvah, Temple Hills, Maryland severely damaged the kitchen, social hall, and classrooms, with damages estimated at $200,000. There were no casualties or injuries. Police arrested David Maness in February and found 38 pounds of dynamite and literature from the right-wing Minutemen organization in his home.
8 October 1977	Shaare Zedek Synagogue	St. Louis, Missouri, United States	Joseph Paul Franklin (white supremacy and antisemitism)	Shaare Zedek Synagogue shooting: Joseph Paul Franklin fired upon congregants leaving a bar mitzvah, killing Gerald Gordon and wounding Steven Goldman and William Ash.
11 March 1977	B'nai B'rith headquarters	Washington, D.C., United States	Hamaas Abdul Khaalis and 12 associated gunmen (Hanafi movement)	1977 Washington, D.C., attack and hostage taking: Twelve gunmen took 149 hostages at the B'nai B'rith headquarters and two other buildings in Washington, D.C. After a 39-hour standoff, the gunmen surrendered the hostages were released.
July 1980	Congregation Shaare Tikvah	Temple Hills, Maryland, United States		Vandals broke into the building and attempted to firebomb the bima and ark, but the synagogue's alarm system alerted the Prince George's County Police, who arrived within minutes, thwarting the attack and minimizing the damage.
29 August 1981	Stadttempel	Vienna, Austria	Marwan Hasan and Hesham Mohammed Rajeh (Palestinian nationalism)	1981 Vienna synagogue attack: Two Palestinian nationals entered the 155-year old Israelite Temple, posing as Jews, opening fire and threw grenades as attendees of a Bar Mitzvah. Two were killed and 18 were wounded. The assailants received life sentences.
18 September 1982	Great Synagogue of Brussels	Brussels, Belgium	Abu Nidal Organization (Palestinian nationalism)	On Rosh Hashanah, the synagogue was attacked by a man with a submachine gun, seriously wounding four people. The attack was attributed to the Abu Nidal Organization.
9 October 1982	Great Synagogue of Rome	Rome, Italy	Five Palestinian militants of the Abu Nidal Organization (Palestinian nationalism)	Great Synagogue of Rome attack: On Shabbat morning, as the families of the local Jewish community began leaving with their children from the back entrance to the synagogue, five elegantly dressed armed attackers walked calmly up to the back entrance of the synagogue and threw at least three hand grenades at the crowd, and afterwards sprayed the crowd with sub-machine gun fire. A 2-year-old toddler was killed and 37 civilians were injured. One of the assailants was identified as Osama Abdel al-Zomar, an alleged member of the Abu Nidal Organization.
1983	Beth Shalom synagogue	Bloomington, Indiana, United States	The Covenant, the Sword, and the Arm of the Lord (CSA)	In the summer of 1983, the Beth Shalom synagogue in Bloomington, Indiana was damaged in an arson attack. Unknown assailants had started a fire at the base of the Torah ark, from which it spread to the sanctuary before being extinguished, leaving tens of thousands of dollars of damage. The group responsible was the white supremacist group, The Covenant, the Sword, and the Arm of the Lord (CSA), which was linked to the Aryan Brotherhood and perpetrated multiple terrorist attacks across America in the early 1980s. The FBI suppressed the group following a siege of its rural Arkansas compound in the spring of 1985.
8 October 1985	Jewish quarter	Djerba, Tunisia	Tunisian security guard	
6 September 1986	Neve Shalom Synagogue	Istanbul, Turkey	Members of Abu Nidal	During Shabbat services, gunmen killed 22 worshippers and wounded 6.
26 January to 28 March 1991	Five Sydney synagogues	Sydney, Australia	Arson attack	1991 Sydney synagogue attacks
August 1991	Crown Heights	Brooklyn, New York, United States	Riot	Crown Heights riot
1 March 1994	Van carrying Jewish students	New York City, New York, United States	Rashid Baz (Anti-U.S. and antisemitic sentiment)	1994 Brooklyn Bridge shooting: shooting attack on a van carrying Chabad-Lubavitch students crossing the bridge as part of an identifiably Jewish convoy of 20 vehicles carrying members of the Chabad-Lubavitch movement.
20 March 1994	Temple Beth Israel	Eugene, Oregon	Chris Lord (white supremacy and antisemitism)	Chris Lord, an individual associated with the Volksfront and American Front, fired ten rounds with an assault rifle into the temple, damaging the interior. The attacks were prompted by a newspaper article about several members of Eugene's Jewish community, including a lesbian. Community organizations responded by standing vigil outside the synagogue during Passover services. Lord and an associate were caught and convicted, and Lord was sentenced to four and a half years in prison.
18 June 1999	Beth Shalom, B'nai Israel, and Knesset Israel	Sacramento, California, United States	Benjamin Matthew and James Tyler Williams (Antisemitism, White supremecy)	Sacramento synagogue firebombings
10 August 1999	North Valley Jewish Community Center	Granada Hills, Los Angeles, California, United States	Buford O. Furrow Jr. (White supremacy)	Los Angeles Jewish Community Center shooting
8 October 2000	Conservative Synagogue Adath Israel of Riverdale	The Bronx, New York City, United States	Mazin Assi and Mohammed Alfaqih (Antisemitism, Anti-Israel sentiment)	2000 Bronx synagogue firebombing: On the morning of the eve of Yom Kippur, two Molotov cocktails were thrown, but did not ignite, at the door of the Conservative Synagogue Adath Israel of Riverdale (CSAIR) in The Bronx in New York City. Two Palestinian men were arrested and found guilty for the attack.
2000	Temple Beth El	Syracuse, New York, United States		Arson attack on Temple Beth El in Syracuse, New York. Hate crime by perpetrator who claimed Palestinian descent.
2000	Beth El, Pittsburgh, and Congregation Ahavath Achim	Carnegie, Pennsylvania, United States	Richard Baumhammers (White supremacy)	White supremacist Richard Baumhammers shot out windows at Congregation Beth El, Pittsburgh, and Congregation Ahavath Achim in Carnegie, Pennsylvania.
4 July 2002	Los Angeles International Airport	Los Angeles, California, United States	Hesham Mohamed Hadayet (Palestinian nationalism)	2002 Los Angeles International Airport shooting: At 11:30 a.m. on 4 July 2002, Hesham Mohamed Hadayet, a 41-year-old Egyptian national, approached the El Al ticket counter inside the Tom Bradley International Terminal at the Los Angeles International Airport, pulled out two Glock pistols, and started shooting at the 90 passengers standing in the line. Hadayet killed Customer Service Agent Victoria Hen and 46-year-old bystander Yaakov Aminov before being killed himself.
25 October 2002	Temple Beth Israel	Eugene, Oregon	Members of Volksfront (white supremacy and antisemitism)	Jacob Laskey, his brother Gabriel Laskey, Gerald Poundstone, Jesse Baker, and one other man, all members of the Volksfront, drove to Beth Israel with the intent of intimidating the congregants. While a service with 80 members attending was taking place, the men threw rocks etched with Nazi swastikas through the synagogue's stained glass windows, then sped off. The men were caught, pleaded guilty, and were convicted. They served sentences ranging from a 6‑month work release term and five years probation, to eleven years and three months in federal prison for the ringleader, Jacob Laskey.
6 May 2003	Valley Beth Shalom	Encino, Los Angeles, California, United States	Farshid Tehrani (mental illness)	As part of a string of attacks against synagogues and other religious institutions in the San Fernando Valley, a Molotov cocktail thrown through window at Valley Beth Shalom synagogue in Encino, California. Farshid Tehrani was arrested for carrying our five arson attacks in 11 days between 26 April and 6 May. In October, he was declared mentally incompetent to stand trial.
15 November 2003	Bet Israel Synagogue and Neve Shalom Synagogue	Istanbul, Turkey	Islamic militant group Great Eastern Islamic Raiders' Front, initially claimed responsibility, later attributed to al-Qaeda	2003 Istanbul bombings
1 April 2004	Temple B'nai Israel	Oklahoma City, Oklahoma, United States	Sean Gillespie (white supremacy and antisemitism)	Gillespie videotaped himself describing his plan to firebomb the temple with a Molotov cocktail and cause as much damage as he could. He said, "I will film it for you viewing enjoyment, my kindred. White power." Surveillance footage caught Gillespie in the act of throwing the Molotov cocktail at the building. Gillespie filmed himself while the temple was burning. The damage was limited to a brick wall and glass window. He then sent a letter to the congregation in hopes of inciting a holy war. Gillespie was arrested 15 days later in Russellville, Arkansas and extradited back to Oklahoma. In 2005, Gillespie was tried, convicted and sentenced to 39 years in prison.
28 July 2006	Jewish Federation of Greater Seattle	Seattle, Washington, United States	Naveed Afzal Haq (Antisemitism, Anti-Zionism)	Seattle Jewish Federation shooting
10 June 2009	United States Holocaust Memorial Museum	Washington, D.C., United States	James Wenneker von Brunn (Antisemitism, Holocaust denial)	United States Holocaust Memorial Museum shooting
11 January 2012		Rutherford and Paramus, New Jersey, United States	Anthony Graziano (Antisemitism)	Firebombing in Rutherford and Paramus, NJ.
13 April 2014	Jewish Community Center of Greater Kansas City and Village Shalom	Overland Park, Kansas, United States	Frazier Glenn Miller Jr. (White supremacy)	2014 Overland Park shootings
29 July 2014	Bergische synagogue	Wuppertal, Germany	Mohamad E., Ismail A. and Mohammad A. (Antisemitism, Anti-Israel sentiment)	During the night, three Palestinians hurled diesel-filled bottles at the building. The fire extinguished swiftly and no serious damage was caused.
18 November 2014	Kehilat Bnei Torah synagogue	Har Nof, Jerusalem	Uday Abu Jamal and Ghassan Abu Jamal (Palestinian nationalism)	2014 Jerusalem synagogue attack
14 February 2015	Great Synagogue (Copenhagen)	Copenhagen, Denmark	Omar Abdel Hamid El-Hussein (Islamic extremism)	2015 Copenhagen shootings
11 February 2016	Nazareth Restaurant	Columbus, Ohio, United States	Mohamed Barry (Islamic extremism)	2016 Ohio restaurant machete attack: Islamist attack on a Middle Eastern restaurant displaying an Israeli flag.
9 December 2017	Gothenburg Synagogue	Gothenburg, Sweden	Two Palestinians, one Syrian migrant, unidentified others (Islamic extremism, anti-Israel)	2017 Gothenburg Synagogue attack: After marches protesting the United States recognition of Jerusalem as capital of Israel, more than a dozen hurled firebombs at the Gothenburg Synagogue while teens from the local Jewish community were attending a party inside. No one was injured and there was no major damage to the property. On 25 June 2018, two Palestinians and one Syrian migrant were convicted for participation. Two were sentenced to two years in prison and the third was sentenced to 15 months.
27 October 2018	Tree of Life – Or L'Simcha Congregation	Pittsburgh, Pennsylvania, United States	Robert Bowers (White supremacy)	Pittsburgh synagogue shooting
27 April 2019 (Passover)	Chabad of Poway	Poway, California, United States	John Earnest (White supremacy)	Poway synagogue shooting
28 July 2019	Young Israel of Greater Miami	Miami Beach, Florida, United States	Carlints St. Louis	A member of the synagogue in N. Miami Beach, FL, 68, was shot in the legs, as he was unlocking the front doors of the synagogue prior to a religious service. The suspect, Carlints St. Louis of Hallandale drove up in a black Chevrolet Impala, and shot him multiple times.
9 October 2019 (Yom Kippur)	Halle Synagogue	Halle, Germany	Stephan Balliet (White supremacy)	Halle synagogue shooting
10 December 2019	JC Kosher Supermarket	Jersey City, New Jersey, United States	David Anderson and Francine Graham (Antisemitism, anti-police sentiment)	2019 Jersey City shooting: Shooting at a Kosher supermarket in Jersey City, New Jersey.
28 December 2019		Monsey, New York, United States	Grafton E. Thomas (Antisemitism)	Monsey Hanukkah stabbing: Five people were stabbed during Hanukkah festivities at the home of a rabbi (which was being used as a synagogue) in Monsey, New York.
15 January 2022	Colleyville synagogue	Colleyville, Texas, United States	Malik Faisal Akram (Islamic extremism)	Colleyville synagogue hostage crisis: Four hostages taken at a synagogue in Colleyville, Texas.
27 January 2023	Neve Yaakov synagogue	Neve Yaakov, East Jerusalem	Khairi Alqam (Unknown)	2023 Neve Yaakov shooting
9 May 2023	El Ghriba Synagogue	Djerba, Tunisia	Wissam Khazri (Unknown)	2023 Djerba synagogue shooting
18 October 2023	Synagogue Brunnenstraße	Berlin, Germany	First attack: two unidentified assailants. Second (thwarted) attack: a 30-year-old man wearing a Palestinian scarf (Police stated that the man arrested was shouting inflammatory and anti-Israel slogans)	There were two attempted attacks on the Jewish Community Centre in Berlin's Mitte district; the first involved Molotov cocktails being thrown at the building, causing no injuries or damage, and the second involved a man wearing a Palestinian scarf and shouting anti-Israeli slogans, who was thwarted when he forced his way to the entrance despite a police cordon.
1 November 2023	Jewish section of Vienna Central Cemetery	Vienna, Austria	Unknown	Unidentified vandals set a fire and sprayed swastikas on external walls overnight in the Jewish section of the Vienna Central Cemetery. The entrance lobby to a ceremonial hall was burned for the first time since the 1938 Kristallnacht pogrom by the Nazis, but there were no injuries. The attack was condemned by Austrian Chancellor Karl Nehammer.
7 November 2023	Congregation Beth Tikvah synagogue and a Confederation CJA community center	Dollard-des-Ormeaux, Montreal, Canada	Unknown	The two buildings were firebombed causing minor damage at the synagogue and a small fire at the back door of the Jewish community center. No one was injured.
12 November 2023	Yeshiva Gedola	Montreal, Canada	Abdirazak Mahdi Ahmed (Unknown)	Ahmed fired shots at the Jewish school prior to escaping in a vehicle. No one was injured.
23 November 2023	Mordechai Navi Synagogue	Yerevan, Armenia	Unknown	A vandal poured fuel on the synagogue's door, setting the building on fire. No serious damage was reported and no one was in the building at the time. Videos of the incident were shared by news outlets in Azerbaijan, against whom Armenia has fought several wars. The following day, Armenian authorities opened an investigation.
5 April 2024	Oldenburg Synagogue	Oldenburg, Germany	Unknown	Arson attack on a synagogue in the city of Oldenburg, Lower Saxony, Germany. German police have offered a cash reward for information about an arson attack.
17 May 2024	Rouen Synagogue	Rouen, France	Unknown	A 29 year old Algerian man threw a bomb through the synagogue's window, lighting the building on fire. After throwing a knife at responding police, the man jumped off of the synagogue's roof and was shot dead by police. Damage inside the synagogue was significant.
25 May 2024	Bais Chaya Mushka school	Toronto, Canada	Unknown	During the night, two masked suspects pulled up with a car before firing at the Jewish elementary girl's school with police saying a bullet hole in the window as well as "other evidence of gunfire" was found.
Night between 28-29 May 2024	Yeshiva Ketana school	Montreal, Canada	Unknown	During the night shots were fired at the Jewish school with at the minimum one bullet hitting it.
30 May 2024	Congregation Schara Tzedeck synagogue	Vancouver, Canada	Unknown	An unknown individual set fire to the doorway of the building likely using an accelerant. No one was inside and the time although there were congregants standing around the corner outside from the doorway who quickly put out the fire. No one was injured and only minor damage was caused.
18 June 2024	Synagogue	Athens, Greece	Unknown	A Greek, Afghan, and Iranian were arrested by Greek officials for arson, gun possession, and robbery after two of the individuals rode near a synagogue and threw flammable material, causing fire.
6 December 2024	Adass Israel Synagogue of Melbourne	Melbourne, Victoria, Australia	Unknown	2024 Melbourne synagogue attack: An arson attack on the Adass Israel Synagogue of Melbourne by two masked perpetrators. One person was injured in the attack.
18 December 2024	Congregation Beth Tikvah synagogue and a Federation CJA community center	Dollard-des-Ormeaux, Montreal, Canada	Mohamed Ilyess Akodad (Unknown)	Akodad firebombed the synagogue causing damage as well as breaking the glass door of an adjacent Jewish community center. He claimed he was offered $15 000 while at a party to ignite two buildings and one car, although he said he didn't know they were associated with the Jewish community.
21 May 2025	Capital Jewish Museum	Washington, D.C., United States	Elias Rodriguez (Antisemitism, Anti-Zionism and revenge for events in Gaza)	2025 Capital Jewish Museum shooting: Elias Rodriguez, 31, shot two staff members of the Israeli Embassy outside the Capital Jewish Museum. After the shooting Rodriguez entered the museum and announced, "I did it for Palestine. I did it for Gaza."
2 October 2025 (Yom Kippur)	Heaton Park Hebrew Congregation Synagogue	Crumpsall, Manchester, United Kingdom	Jihad al-Shamie (Antisemitism, Islamic state ideology)	2025 Manchester synagogue attack: A man drove a car into pedestrians at the synagogue before exiting the vehicle and stabbing pedestrians. Two people were killed and three were seriously injured in the attack.
10 January 2026	Beth Israel Congregation	Jackson, Mississippi, United States	Stephen Spencer Pittman (Antisemitism)	Pittman broke a window with an axe and then set alight the synagogue using gas which caused considerable damage and rendered the synagogue, which is Mississippi's largest and oldest, unusable and indefinitely closed. Pittman sustained non life threatening burn injuries but no one else was injured or inside the building at the time.
28 January 2026	770 Eastern Parkway	Crown Heights, Brooklyn, United States	Dan Sohail (Antisemitism suspected)	2026 Chabad headquarters ramming attack: Sohail continually struck the entrance at the Chabad-Lubavitch World Headquarters with his car. No one was injured.
12 March 2026	Temple Israel	West Bloomfield Township, Michigan, United States	Ayman Mohamed Ghazali (Hezbollah-inspired terrorism against the Jewish community)	2026 Temple Israel attack: Ghazali drove his truck into the hallway of the synagogue while children were attending a pre-school on the site, injuring a security guard before engaging in a firefight and killing himself. 63 officers required hospital treatment for smoke inhalation after his car burst up in flames from incendiary devices inside it which seriously damaged the building.
3 June 2026	Temple Emanu-El-Beth Sholom	Westmount, Montreal Canada	Steven Luu (Unknown)	Luu broke a window and set fire to the building although only minor damage was caused and it was quickly extinguished by firefighters.
13 August 2026	Central Synagogue	Manhattan, New York City	Larry Montes (unknown)	Montes entered the synagogue, attacking a congregant during Friday night Sabbath services, before being arrested by an NYPD officer serving a security detail at the congregation. The individual arrested was charged with both state and federal hate crimes, which have a maximum sentence of 20 years in prison.
17 September 2026	Bergische Synagogue	Wuppertal, Germany	Unidentified 37 year old Afghan citizen (Antisemitism)	The suspect threw two bags with inflammable liquid on the building and emptied out a third close to a side entrance before lighting the liquid on fire. He also espoused antisemitic remarks on the site. The fire was quickly put out by synagogue staff.
20 September 2026 (Yom Kippur)	Sons of Jacob Synagogue	Belleville, Ontario Canada	Sean Ward (Antisemitism suspected)	2026 Belleville synagogue shooting: During Yom Kippur services inside the synagogue, Ward began firing at an officer outside who was there to protect the congregation. The subsequent shooting left the officer seriously wounded and Ward in a life threatening condition, but he would succumb to his injuries the next day. A second officer was also involved in the gunfight, which left numerous bullet holes in adjacent vehicles and homes as well as the synagogue's windows.

=== 1950s synagogue bombings ===
  - 1958 – March 16: An explosion caused severe damage to the school wing of Temple Beth El in Miami, Florida.
  - 1958 – March 16: Bombing of Jewish Community Center in Nashville, Tennessee at 8:07 p.m., claimed by segregationists of the Confederate Union. The front of the unoccupied building was damaged by dynamite, including broken windows and the front door, but the center reopened two days after the bombing.
  - 1958 – April 28: Bombing of Jewish Center, a synagogue in Jacksonville, Florida.
  - 1958 – October 12: bombing of The Temple in Atlanta, Georgia by white supremacists.
  - 1958 – October 14, bomb damaged Temple Anshei Emeth, Peoria, Illinois.
- 1967 – series of attacks by white separatists on Beth Israel Congregation in Jackson, Mississippi.
- 1968 – series of attacks by white separatists on Congregation Beth Israel in Meridian, Mississippi.
- 1970 – As part of the Rochester bombings, three synagogues are among nine buildings bombed by the Rochester crime family over a four week period in Rochester, New York,

== Failed attacks ==
A number of planned attacks were unsuccessful, either due to prevention by authorities or failed execution.

Disruption date	Target	Location	Perpetrator (motive)	Details
12 November 1957	Temple Beth El	Charlotte, North Carolina, United States	Unknown	Six sticks of dynamite with party burned 14‑foot fuse was discovered outside the synagogue
9 February 1958	Temple Emanuel	Gastonia, North Carolina, United States	Unknown	Thirty sticks of dynamite discovered by police in a suitcase outside the synagogue
9 November 1969	Fasanenstrasse Synagogue	West Berlin, Germany	Tupamaros West-Berlin	During ceremonies to commemorate the 31st anniversary of Kristallnacht, the German Marxist Tupamaros West-Berlin attempted to attack the Jewish Community Center located at the synagogue; the bomb failed to explode.
April 2001	United States Holocaust Memorial Museum, the New England Holocaust Memorial, Anti-Defamation League offices, well-known American Jews, including Steven Spielberg; and black leaders, including Rev. Jesse Jackson	Northeastern United States	Leo Felton from the White Order of Thule and Erica Chase of the Creativity Movement (white supremacy, antisemitism)	2002 white supremacist terror plot: Felton, the mixed-race son of a civil rights activist, and his girlfriend Chase planned to build a fertilizer bomb like one used in the Oklahoma City bombing and attack landmarks associated with American Jews and African Americans to incite a racial holy war. Felton and Chase were convicted for the plot on 27 July 2002. Felton received 21 years and 10 months in prison.
July 2005	Synagogues, Israeli consulate, U.S. military facilities	Southern California	Kevin James, Levar Haley Washington, Gregory Vernon Patterson, Hammad Riaz Samana (Islamic extremism)	2005 Los Angeles bomb plot: A group of ex-convicts formed the radical Islamic group Jam’iyyat Ul-Islam Is-Saheeh from inside prison. The group, led by James, planned to rob gas stations in southern California and attack "enemies of Islam."
17 September 2008	Stewart Air National Guard Base, Riverdale Temple, Riverdale Jewish Center	Riverdale, New York	James Cromitie, David Williams, Onta Williams, Laguerre Payen (antisemitism, anti-Americanism)	Bronx terrorism plot: Cromitie, Williams, Williams, and Payen planned to bomb the Riverdale Temple and nearby Riverdale Jewish Center. They were also to fire Stinger surface-to-air guided missiles at military planes at Stewart Air National Guard Base.
21 March 2009	Ida Crown Jewish Academy	Chicago, Illinois, United States	Mohammed Alkaramla (anti-Israel)	See also: Antisemitic incidents during the Gaza War (2008–2009) During the 2008-2009 Gaza war, 25-year-old Mohammed Alkaramla, a native of Jordan, mailed a letter threatening to blow up a Jewish high school if Israel didn't withdraw troops from Gaza. In July 2010, Alkaramla was found guilty of one count of making threats against the school. He was sentenced to 25 months in prison in November 2010.
11 May 2011	Unidentified synagogues	New York City, New York, United States	Ahmed Ferhani and Mohamed Mamdouh	2011 Manhattan terrorism plot: Ferhani and Mamdouh purchased weapons and bombs in a sting operation as part of a plot to attack unspecified synagogues, a church, and the Empire State Building. In December 2012, Ferhani pleaded guilty to terrorism conspiracy and terrorism-related weapons possession charges and was sentenced to 10 years in state prison. Mamdouh pleaded guilty and was sentenced to 5 years in state prison.
7 December 2018	Congregation B’nai Israel and Temple Shomer Emunim	Toledo, Ohio, United States	Damon Joseph (a.k.a. Abdullah Ali Yusuf) (Islamic extremism)	Toledo synagogue attack plot: Joseph desired to conduct a mass casualty attack against a synaogogue in Toledo in the name of ISIS. In 2021, he was sentenced to 20 years in prison and lifetime supervised release after pleading guilty.
2 November 2019	Temple Emanuel	Pueblo, Colorado, United States	Richard Holzer	Pueblo synagogue plot: Self-described neo-Nazi Richard Holzer planned to detonate what he believed were explosives to blow up Temple Emanuel. Holzer was unknowingly in contact with FBI Online Covert Employees, was arrested, and admitted to planning to blow up the synagogue. Holzer pled guilty to federal hate crime and explosives charges in October 2020 and was sentenced to 19.5 years in prison in February 2021.
19 November 2019	Unidentified synagogue	New York City, New York, United States	Matthew Mahler and Christopher Brown	Mahler and Brown were arrested at Penn Station after posting on social media that they wanted to "shoot up a synagogue and die." Brown was arrested with an illegal firearm, a large hunting knife, ammunition, and a Nazi armband. The online threat was first noted by the Community Security Service, which alerted authorities. Jamil Hakime, who drove Mahler and Brown to purchase the gun pled guilty to a federal conspiracy charge in July 2023.
February 2021	Maghain Aboth Synagogue	Singapore	Amirull Ali	Maghain Aboth Synagogue attack plot: Amirull Ali, a member of the Singapore Armed Forces, planned to stab three members of the Maghain Aboth Synagogue in retaliation for the role of Israel and Jews in the Israeli–Palestinian conflict. Ali also planned to travel to Gaza to join Hamas' military wing, the al-Qassam Brigades. The plot was foiled when Ali was arrested by the Internal Security Department of Singapore in February 2021.
4 November 2022	Unspecified	Unspecified	Omar Alkattoul (antisemitism, homophobia)	On November 1, 2022, Omar Alkattoul from Sayreville, New Jersey, used social media to send a manifesto with a threat to attack a synagogue based on his hatred of Jews. He admitted he had researched how to obtain a gun and about mass shootings. Alkattoul pleaded guilty to one count of transmitting a threat and was sentenced to 15 months in federal prison on 14 November 2023.
16 June 2023	Congregation Shaarey Zedek (Michigan)	East Lansing, Michigan	Seann Patrick Pietila (neo-Nazi, antisemitism)	Twenty-year-old Seann Patrick Pietila was arrested by the FBI for threatening to conduct a mass killing at Congregation Shaarey Zedek in East Lansing. A search at his home uncovered weapons, ammunition, Nazi paraphernalia, and military manuals. Pietila pled guilty in November and was sentenced to a year and one day in federal prison and ordered to pay $160,000 in restitution in March 2024.

== Synagogue attacks ==
=== Nineteenth century ===
The 1834 Safed pogrom, involving the mass violence against Jews perpetrated by local Arabs and Druze, featured attacks on local synagogues and the desecration of synagogue ritual objects. Thirteen synagogues, along with an estimated 500 Torah scrolls, were destroyed in the course of the attack. Attacks on Jews hiding in synagogues also took place.

=== Twentieth century ===
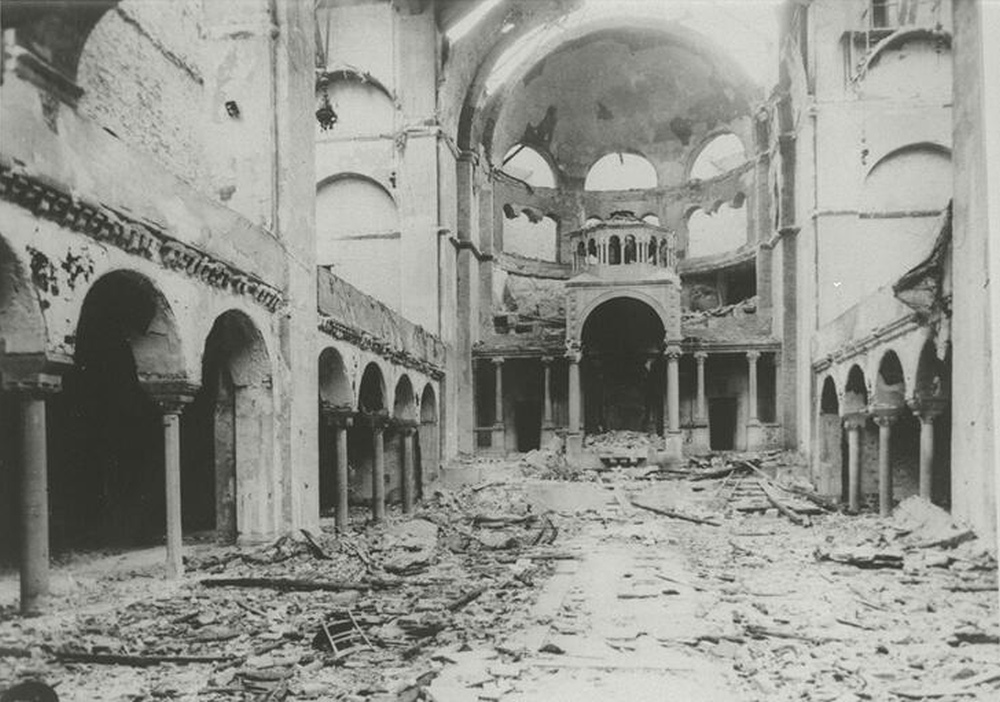
Berlin synagogue destroyed on Kristallnacht (1938)

In the twentieth century, a major event involving the destruction of synagogues was the Kristallnacht, or the Night of Broken Glass, occurring on November 9–10, 1938. The event was a pogrom against Jews carried out in Nazi Germany by the Sturmabteilung (SA) and Schutzstaffel (SS) paramilitary forces, with participation from the Hitler Youth and German civilians. A major feature of this event was the widespread destruction of over a thousand synagogues. Of the 93 synagogues and Jewish prayer houses in Vienna, the Stadttempel was the only one in the city to survive World War II, as it could not be destroyed without setting adjoining buildings on fire. All of the others were destroyed by the SA assisted by local authorities. Similar destruction occurred throughout Austria, carried out by the Austrian SA with synagogues destroyed in Eisenstadt, Linz, Salzburg, and resort towns. Other notable attacks on synagogues from this period include the 1941 Riga synagogue burnings, an event that took place during the first days of the Nazi German occupation of the city of Riga, the capital and largest city in the country of Latvia. Many Jews confined in the synagogues died in the fires. Many other anti-Semitic measures were launched at the same time, ultimately followed by the murder of the vast majority of the Jews of Latvia. That same year, in Paris, on the night of October 2–3, 1941, explosive devices were placed in front of six synagogues causing damage to them. The affected synagogues were Synagogue des Tournelles (in the Jewish Marais district), Synagogue de la rue Copernic (16th arrondissement of Paris), Synagogue Nazareth (3rd arrondissement of Paris), Synagogue de la rue Pavée (4th arrondissement of Paris), Montmartre Synagogue (18th arrondissement of Paris), and the Grand Synagogue of Paris (9th arrondissement of Paris).

Following the Second World War, notable attacks on synagogues include the 1949 Menarsha synagogue bombing that took place on August 5, 1949 in the Jewish quarter of Damascus, Syria. The grenade attack claimed the lives of 12 civilians and injured about 30. Most of the victims were children. A simultaneous attack was also carried out at the Great Synagogue in Aleppo. Other bombings from this period include the 1957-58 USA synagogue bombings. A series of violent attacks that took place between November 11, 1957, and October 14, 1958. In total, there were five bombings and three attempted bombings of synagogues, seven in the Southern United States and one in the Midwest United States. There were no deaths or injuries. These events took place during an increase in antisemitic activity in the United States, both nonviolent and violent, after U.S. Supreme Court established that racial segregation in public schools was unconstitutional with Brown v. Board of Education in May 1954. (See also, 1958 Atlanta synagogue bombing). That same decade saw the 1956 Shafrir synagogue shooting in Kfar Chabad, Israel. The attack which was carried out by Palestinian terrorists on April 11, 1956. Three Palestinian attackers who crossed into Israel from Egypt attacked the study hall of a synagogue while it was full of children and teenagers. Six people (five children and a youth worker) were killed.

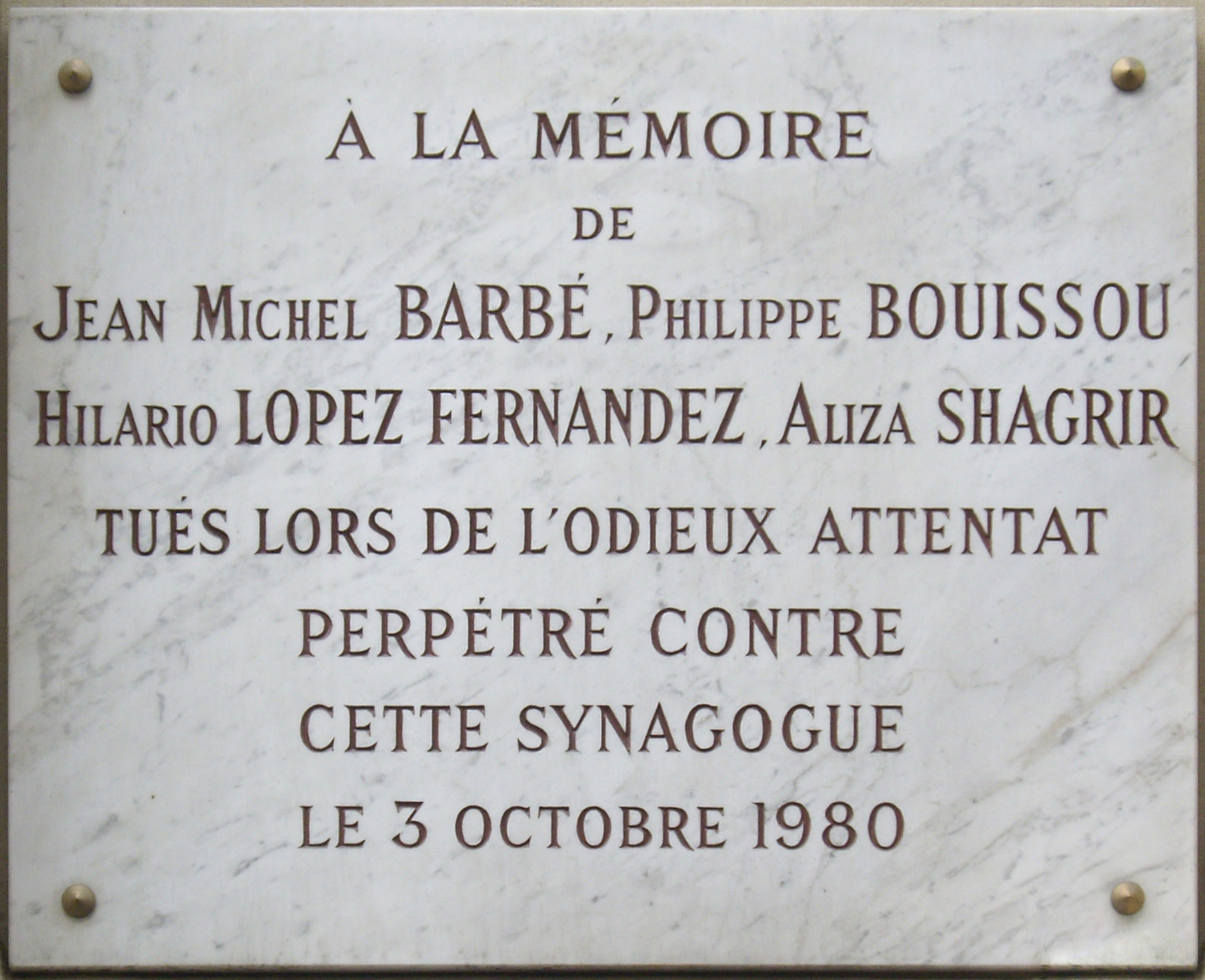
Plaque commemorating the victims of the 1980 Paris synagogue bombing

Attacks on synagogues continued in the subsequent decades. In the case of the 1980 Paris synagogue bombing, which occurred on October 3, 1980, a bomb exploded outside Rue Copernic synagogue, a Reform synagogue, in the 16th arrondissement of Paris, France. The synagogue was full of approximately 320 worshippers. Four people were killed in the blast. According to investigators, the bomb had been set to detonate after prayers concluded and as worshippers were leaving the building. However, the service had started several minutes late and therefore there were few people in the vicinity of the bomb. The 1981 Vienna synagogue attack was a terror attack that occurred on August 29, 1981, in the Stadttempel of Vienna, Austria. The attackers were two Palestinian terrorists of the Abu Nidal Organization. The mass shooting and grenade attack killed two people and wounded 18 others attending a Bar mitzvah service. Two months later, the 1981 Antwerp synagogue bombing occurred on October 20, 1981, when a truck bomb exploded outside a Portuguese Jewish synagogue in the centre of Antwerp, Belgium, in the diamond district of Antwerp. The explosion took place shortly after 9:00 AM on a Tuesday morning, a few minutes before Simchat Torah religious services were to begin. Three people were killed and 106 wounded. The following year saw the Great Synagogue of Rome attacked by armed Palestinian terrorists on October 9, 1982. A 2-year-old toddler, Stefano Gaj Taché, was killed in the attack, while 37 civilians were injured. The attackers used a combination of hand grenades and sub-machine gun fire. This period also saw the 1986 Istanbul synagogue massacre, which occurred on September 6, 1986, at the Neve Shalom Synagogue in Istanbul's Beyoglu district, and resulted in 22 deaths. Reportedly, a pair of terrorists entered on the men's side of the mechitza and opened fire on the crowd with machine guns. They then doused the bodies of the dead and injured with gasoline, which they lit on fire.

The following decade saw the 1991 Sydney synagogue attacks, a series of events occurring between January 26 and March 28, 1991. Five synagogues in Sydney, Australia, were targeted by arsonists. Four synagogues were significantly damaged and one attack thwarted by a security guard. The attacks resulted in the permanent closure of one synagogue, the injury of the security guard. In 1999, the Sacramento synagogue firebombings, an attack on three California synagogues, occurred on June 18, 1999. The attackers were white supremacist brothers Benjamin Matthew Williams and James Tyler Williams who were later involved in other hate crimes and subsequently arrested for the murder of a gay couple.

=== Twenty-first century ===
==== 2000s and 2010s ====
Attacks on synagogues continued into the twenty-first century. The 2002 Lyon synagogue attack occurred on 30 March 2002, involving a group of masked men using two cars to conduct a vehicle-ramming attack in Lyon, France. After ramming the synagogue, the cars were set on fire. The attack caused severe damage to the synagogue. The Lyon attack was one of a series of pro-Palestinian attacks on French synagogues and other Jewish targets. The series of attacks included attacks on synagogues in Paris, Marseille and Strasbourg. The 2002 Djerba synagogue bombing was a terror attack on the El Ghriba synagogue in Djerba, Tunisia, carried out by Al-Qaeda. The attack occurred on 11 April 2002, involving a natural gas truck fitted with explosives which drove past security barriers at the ancient El Ghriba synagogue. The truck detonated at the front of the synagogue, killing 14 German tourists, three Tunisians, and two French nationals. More than 30 others were wounded. Following this, the 2009 Caracas synagogue attack occurred on 31 January 2009 at the Tiféret Israel Synagogue in Caracas, Venezuela's oldest synagogue. The attack occurred amid a rise in tensions prompted by the 2008–2009 Gaza War, after Venezuela severed diplomatic relations with Israel and Israel responded by expelling Venezuelan officials from the country. The attack involved a group of 15 attackers who broke into the synagogue and occupied the building for several hours. Security guards were tied up and gagged and the gang destroyed offices and the repository where the holy books were stored. They daubed the walls with antisemitic and anti-Israeli graffiti. They also stole a database that listed Jews who lived in Venezuela.

The following decade saw the 2014 Jerusalem synagogue attack, a terrorist attack on the Kehilat Bnei Torah synagogue in Jerusalem, occurring on 18 November 2014. Two Palestinian men attacked synagogue congregants with axes, knives, and a gun, killing four worshippers, injuring eight others including a Druze Israeli police officer who later died of his wounds.

Additionally, the same decade saw the 2017 Gothenburg Synagogue attack, the 2018 Pittsburgh synagogue shooting, the 2019 Poway synagogue shooting, and the 2019 Halle synagogue shooting.

==== 2020s ====
Attacks in the 2020s include the 2022 Colleyville synagogue hostage crisis, the 2023 Djerba synagogue shooting, 2024 Melbourne synagogue attack, 2025 Manchester synagogue attack and the 2026 Temple Israel synagogue attack.

In January 2026, on the Chabad holiday of Yud Shvat, a car ramming attack took place at the 770 Eastern Parkway synagogue in New York. The building sustained damage and the driver was arrested.

On March 12, 2026, a man rammed his vehicle into Temple Israel in West Bloomfield, Michigan, 2026 Temple Israel attack, driving it into the hallways, where it burst into flames. Sixty-three law enforcement offices were treated for smoke inhalation.

In August 2026, man was charged with hate crimes after disrupting Sabbath services and injuring a woman and security guard at Central Synagogue in Manhattan.

A gunman shot a police officer stationed outside a Belleville, Ontario, synagogue on September 20, 2026, as Yom Kippur services were being held. The police officer stationed at the synagogue, Sons of Jacob Congregation, returned fire and both were seriously injured. The suspect died the next day. Belleville's police chief said the attack was "hate motivated," calling it "a deliberate attack directed at members of the Jewish community."

== Gallery ==
Attacks on synagogues
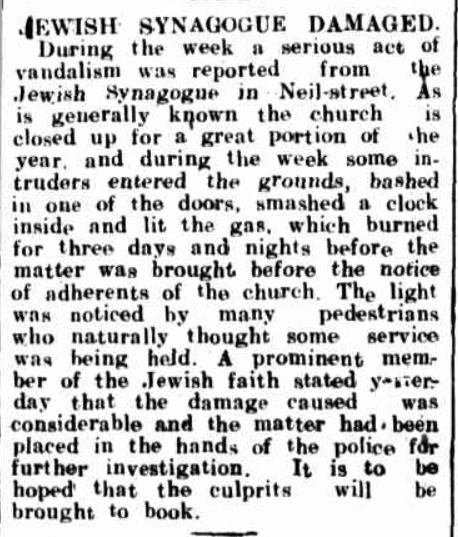
Report of an arson attack on an Australian synagogue (1920)

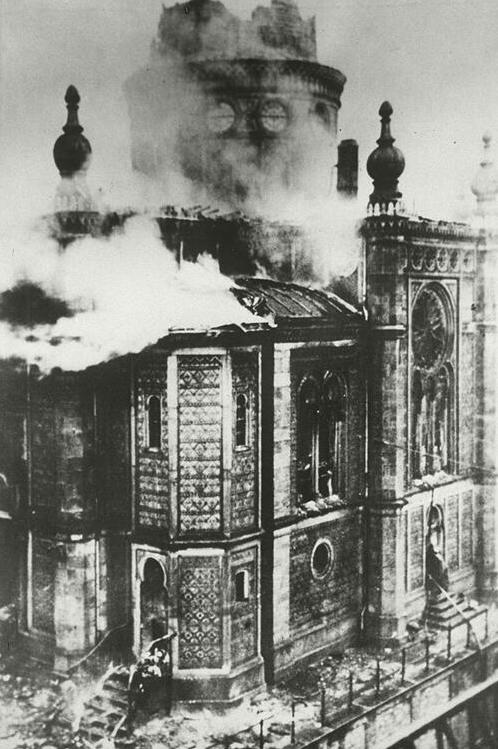
Wiesbaden synagogue set alight (1938)

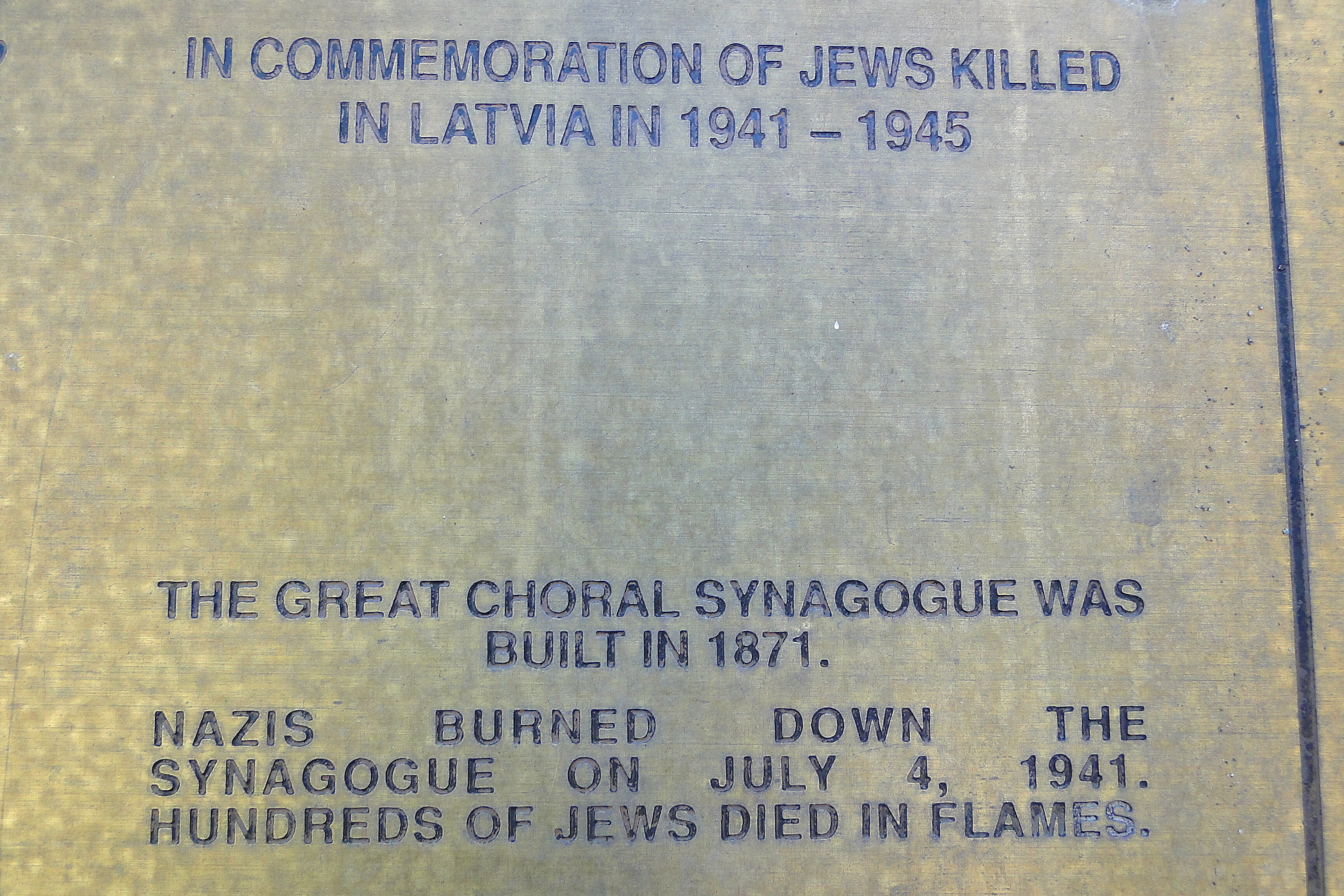
Plaque marking the destruction of Great Choral Synagogue of Riga (1941)

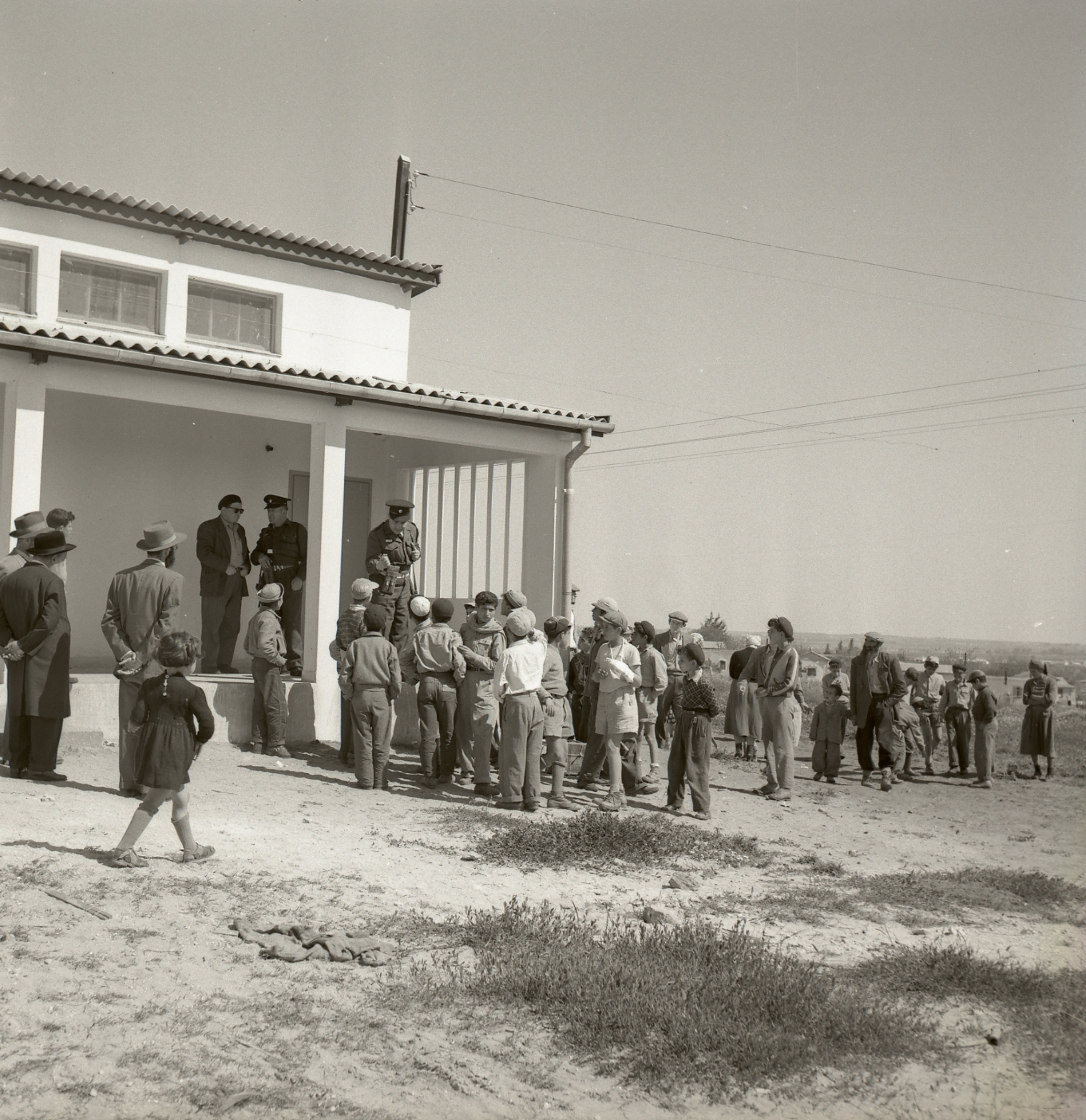
Site of the Shafrir synagogue attack in Kfar Chabad (1956)

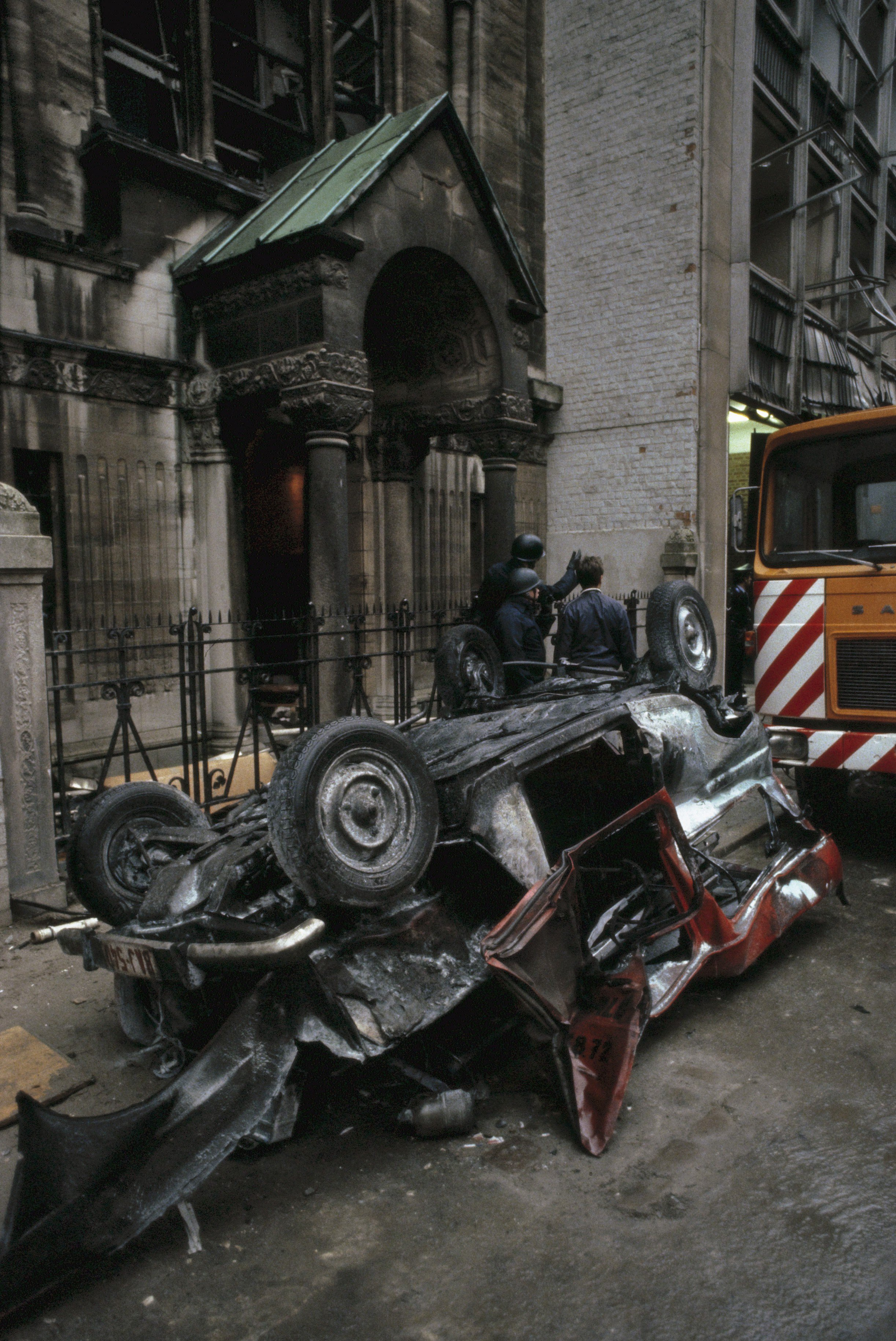
Site of the Antwerp synagogue bombing (1981)

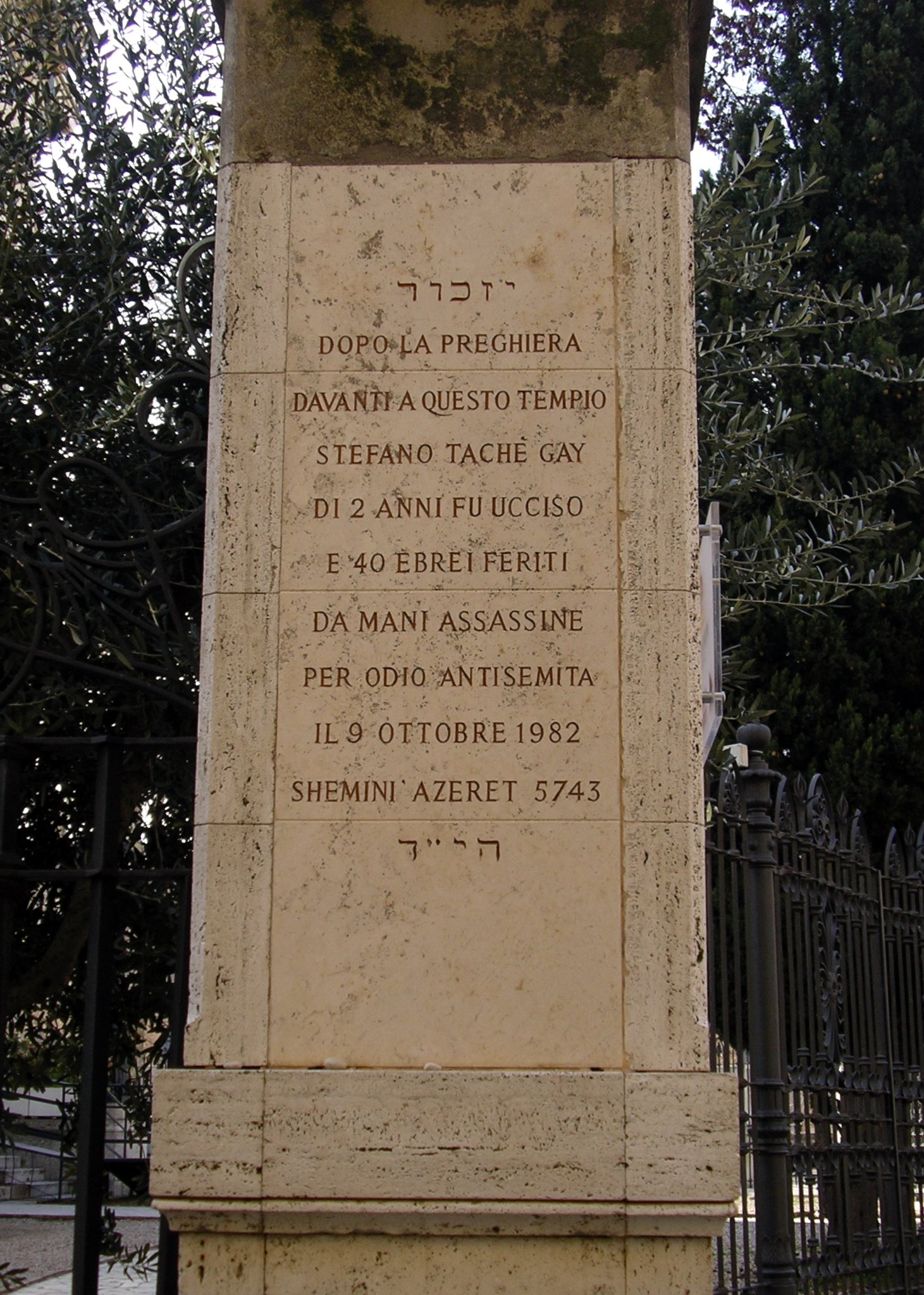
Monument for the victims of the Great Synagogue of Rome attack (1982)

== See also ==
- List of antisemitic incidents in the United States
- Timeline of attacks against synagogues in Israel
- List of attacks against Israeli embassies and diplomats
- List of attacks against African-American churches
- List of attacks against houses of worship in the United States
- List of attacks against Latter-day Saint churches
- List of cases of church arson
- List of mass shootings in the United States
