= Toledo terror plot =

Toledo terror plot may refer to:

- 2006 Toledo terror plot
- Toledo synagogue attack plot in 2018
