= Nashville bombing =

Nashville bombing may refer to any of several incidents in Tennessee, US:

- The 2020 Nashville bombing, a vehicle suicide bombing
- The 1960 segregationist bombing of the house of civil rights activist Z. Alexander Looby
- The 1958 Jewish Community Center bombing
- The 1957 Hattie Cotton Elementary School bombing
