= Shafrir =

Shafrir may refer to:

== Persons ==
- Doree Shafrir, American author and BuzzFeed editor
- Dov Shafrir, Israeli Custodian of Absentees' Property

== Others ==
- Shafrir, Israel, later Kfar Chabad
  - Shafrir synagogue shooting attack, 1956
- Israeli missile series also known as Python
