= Toledo synagogue attack plot =

Plot to attack synagogues in Ohio, United States

- Location: Toledo, Ohio, United States
- Date: December 7, 2018
- Target: Congregation B'nai Israel; Temple Shomer Emunim 2018
- Deaths: 0
- Injuries: 0
- Charges: One count of attempting to provide material support to the Islamic State of Iraq and al-Sham (ISIS)
- Verdict: Guilty
- Convictions: 20 years
- Convicted: Damon Joseph

The Toledo synagogue attack plot was a plot to attack two synagogues in Toledo, Ohio. A suspect, Damon Joseph, was arrested on December 7, 2018, in Holland, Ohio, and was charged with attempting to provide material support to ISIS.

== Plan ==
The two synagogues Joseph allegedly planned to attack were Congregation B’nai Israel, (Conservative) and Temple Shomer Emunim, (Reform) Both synagogues are located on the campus of the Jewish Community Center campus in Sylvania, Ohio.

== Arrest and legal proceedings ==
Joseph was arrested on 7 December and charged with one count of attempting to provide material support to ISIS. In September 2021 he was sentenced to 20 years in prison, and is currently serving his sentence at Federal Correctional Institution, McKean.

== Radicalization ==
Joseph was radicalized online. He used Abdullah Ali Yusuf as an alternative name.

== Criminal history ==
Investigators began to correspond with Joseph in September 2018, posing as ISIS agents, after images of knives and firearms on his social media accounts drew concern. As one of his social media photos had been originally distributed by the media wing of ISIS. He allegedly told undercover agents that he was inspired by the Pittsburgh synagogue shooting, and he admired the shooter, stating that; "My opinion is that Jews are evil and they get what's coming to them."

On December 2, 2018, he sent details of his plan to an undercover agent, to carry out an attack on at least one Toledo synagogue, and added notes of what types of weapons and ammunition to gather, when to attack and how to escape or shoot out with police. On December 7, he met with an undercover agent and took a black duffel bag containing two semiautomatic rifles that had been rendered inoperable by officials, he was then arrested. His connection to ISIS was highlighted in a statement released by Assistant Attorney General for National Security John C. Demers, where he claimed Joseph's actions were allegedly inspired by ISIS's call to violence and hate and that Joseph planned the attack in the name of ISIS.

== See also ==
- List of attacks on Jewish institutions
