= List of attacks on synagogues in Israel =

List of synagogue attacks in Israel

This is a list of antisemitic attacks and vandalism against synagogue buildings and property in Israel. Vandalism of synagogues is not uncommon in Israel.

== 1986 ==
June

In Tel Aviv on June 11, the Bnei Benjamin synagogue was torched and swastikas were daubed on the walls of the Great Synagogue. On June 16, vandals rampaged through the Chidushei Harim yeshiva destroying tefillin, prayer books, bibles and copies of the Talmud, scrawling "down with the black parasites" on the walls. In Jerusalem, a Chabad synagogue was ransacked and the Torah scroll was slashed and hundreds of prayer books were destroyed. The violence was instigated in retaliation for the destruction of multiple bus shelters by religious Jews with one group calling itself Citizens Against Zealotry threatening to burn a synagogue for every bus shelter destroyed. MK Rabbi Avraham Yosef Shapira declared that "only in an anti-Semitic country could such acts take place." Knesset Speaker Shlomo Hillel said the synagogue arson was reminiscent "of the worst experience of the Jewish people." Israeli President Chaim Herzog called the synagogue attacks "domestic anti-Semitism."

== 1997 ==
October 7

In Jerusalem, vandals daubed swastikas and "damned wicked ones" at the entrance to the Harel Reform synagogue.

October 12

In Kfar Sava, a Conservative synagogue was vandalised on Yom Kippur and had the mezuzah ripped off the doorpost.

== 2000 ==
June

In Beersheba, the Masorti Eshel Avraham Synagogue had its windows smashed. In Jerusalem, a blaze at the Conservative Kehillat Ya'ar Ramot synagogue damaged the main sanctuary, furniture and prayer books. Israeli Prime Minister Ehud Barak called it "an awful act that causes every Jew to shudder" adding that "it is seven times more shocking when it occurs in Jerusalem, the eternal capital of the State of Israel".

== 2003 ==
April

In Bnei Brak, six synagogues were set on fire; a seventh was sprayed with graffiti.

May 22

In Jerusalem, the Mevakshei Derech Reform synagogue had its windows smashed.

== 2005 ==
January 26

in Beer Sheva, swastikas and "Death to the Jews, Heil Hitler" in Russian were painted on the wall of a synagogue.

May 21

In Nazareth Illit, the Bnei Akiva synagogue was ransacked and prayer books desecrated and burned.

== 2006 ==
February 11

In Tel Aviv, considerable damage was caused to the Geulat Yisrael synagogue in the Shenkin neighbourhood. Windows were smashed and walls daubed with "If we don't march in Jerusalem – you won't walk in Tel Aviv".

March 5

In Petah Tikva, swastikas and "death to Jews" was sprayed on at a synagogue.

May 4

In Petah Tikva, approximately 20 swastikas are sprayed on the Holy Ark, Torah scroll and walls of the Great Synagogue.

== 2007 ==
March 10

In Haifa, Nazi swastikas and a drawing of a nude woman were scrawled on the wall.

September 30

In Haifa, the sukkah of the Neve David synagogue was burnt down and prayer books were sprayed with "death to religious people". A witness said the culprits gave the Nazi salute while calling "Heil Hitler".

November 7

In Bnei Brak, the Biala synagogue on Ezra Street had its property smeared in feces and doused with wine.

== 2008 ==
May 7

In Bnei Brak, a Holy Ark was sprayed with satanic graffiti and gasoline poured on the floor. Police said three other local synagogues had also been targeted.

== 2009 ==
March 8

In Haifa, the Neve Zion synagogue was set ablaze. A week earlier on March 3, the Heichal Shimshon synagogue in the same neighbourhood was set on fire and the Holy Ark and prayer books were damaged.

August 30

In Haifa, the Naveh Shaanan synagogue was subject to an arson attack.

November 8

In Ashkelon, vandals broke into the N’vei Dekalim synagogue damaging furniture, prayer books and alms boxes.

== 2010 ==
April 17

In Ajami, swastikas and Palestinian flags were drawn on the walls of the Beit El synagogue.

June 23

In Tiberias, intruders smashed every window and ripped out antiquated metal bars of a historic building serving as a Chabad-Lubavitch center. $5,000 in cash was stolen along with silverware and computers.

== 2011 ==
March 25

In Netanya, the Reform Beit Yisrael synagogue was subjected to stone-throwing attacks by Haredi youths which continued for at least three consecutive weeks.

April 14

In Raanana, a Reform synagogue had its windows shattered and was sprayed with graffiti for third time in recent months.

October 8

In Jaffa, a synagogue was firebombed after two Arab cemeteries were vandalised.

October 12

In Safed, "Death to Jews" was scrawled on four synagogues.

December 30

In Ashdod, a synagogue wall was sprayed with swastikas and "Death to Haredim".

== 2012 ==
January 15

In Hemed, Torah scrolls were thrown on the floor and covered with mud.

May 28

In Hamat Tiberias, the ancient synagogue mosaic was smashed and daubed with graffiti in protest of archeological digs at ancient gravesites. The head of the Eastern Galilee and Golan region of the Antiquities Authority said the vandalism "destroyed one of the most magnificent synagogues in the country," and that "the damage is irreversible, it's doubtful we will be able to see the mosaic like it was before... The mosaic floor was here for 1,600 years until these vandals destroyed so many years of history.”

June 22

In Maor, vandals sprayed praise for Mohammed and Muslim prayers on the walls of a synagogue.

== 2013 ==
May 26

In Haifa, a synagogue was sprayed with swastikas, anti-Semitic graffiti and drawings indicating devil worship.

May 29

In Bat Yam, windows were smashed and swastikas were daubed on the walls of the Ha’Ohel synagogue. The warden, who suffered a panic attack, said "for how long must we feel that we are still in exile? This is the fourth time in a month." A month earlier crosses and the phrase "brothel" was scrawled on the walls.

July 30

In Netanya, ten Torah scrolls were burnt by a thief attempting to cover his tracks in a synagogue on Nordau Street.

August 23

In Ramat Eshkol, inside a synagogue belonging to Bnei Akiva, the Torah scroll had been flung to the ground and graphic images sprayed on the walls.

December 31

In Tel Aviv, Nazi slogans and swastikas are spray-painted at the Gr"a synagogue.

== 2014 ==
January 10

In Ezer, vandals broke off the Torah Ark door and tore the Torah scrolls which had been thrown on the floor.

January 30

In Raanana, a Reform synagogue was sprayed with quotes from the writings of Moses Maimonides on heretics.

May 12

In Jerusalem, the entrance sign to the Masorti Moreshet Yisrael congregation was daubed with swastikas.

November 30

In Tel Aviv, the words "In a place where the Jewish State bill will be legislated books will be burned," were painted on the wall of the International Synagogue. Believing that left-wing activists were behind the attack, the rabbi called it a "clear act of anti-Semitism."

== 2015 ==
May 31

In Ra'anana, anti-Semitic graffiti was daubed on the Ahavat Reim Synagogue. The vandals also desecrated Mezuzah parchments by using their own blood to paint crosses and swastikas on them before plastering them on the walls of the synagogue. The police chief called the incident a "heinous desecration of religious symbols."

July 23

In Jerusalem, the Pitchei Olam synagogue on King George Street was daubed with swastikas and the curtain of the Holy Ark was burnt.

July 26

In Bnei Brak on Tisha B'Av, the Beis Chabad was vandalized and the Holy Ark was set alight.

November 25

In Arad, a severed pig's foot was hung near the entrance of a recently inaugurated Haredi synagogue.

== 2016 ==
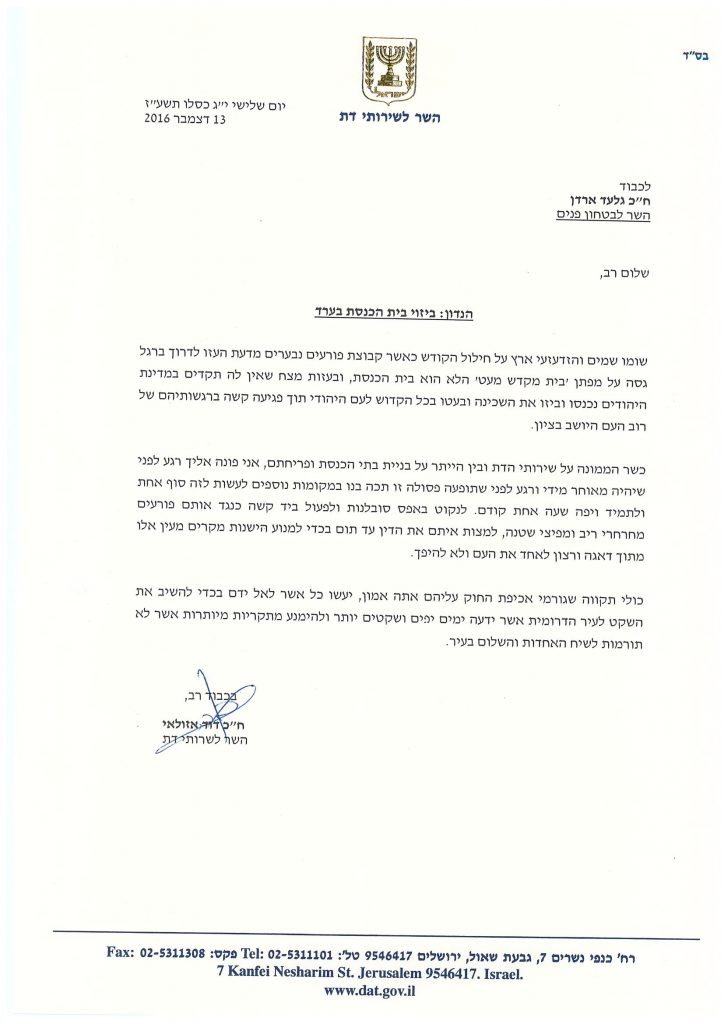
Letter to MK Gilad Erdan from MK David Azulai asking that the perpetrators of the desecration of a synagogue in Arad be brought to justice (13-Dec-2016)

January 12

In Tel Aviv, anti-Semitic graffiti were scrawled on the walls of a synagogue in the Neve Tzedek neighborhood.

July 6

In Bnei Brak, a synagogue was set on fire damaging prayer books.

October 13

In Katamon, in a repeat attack, black crosses were sprayed on the external walls of an Iranian Orthodox synagogue during Yom Kippur.

November 24

In Raanana, a Reform synagogue was sprayed hate graffiti and death threats were left in envelopes on its doorstep held down by a knife addressed to prominent Reform leaders.

December 12

In Arad, anti-religious activists stormed the central Ashkenazi synagogue disturbing prayers of the Hasidic community. A speaker at an emergency meeting called by MK Yaakov Litzman said "It is inconceivable that something that would not be done to Jews in enemy states, such as Iran, should be done to Jews here in Israel." The incident led to tens of thousands of people protesting in Bnei Brak, Jerusalem and Ashdod.

== 2017 ==
April 12

In Petah Tikva, a swastika is sprayed next to a synagogue on the first day of Passover.

May 20

In Meah Shearim, the Chabad synagogue was trashed and had various liquids smeared over the walls.

June 3

In Petah Tikva, two synagogues, (one on Sokolov Street, the other on Usishkin Street), were sprayed with swastikas.

June 21

In Nahlaot, swastikas were daubed inside a synagogue next to the Holy Ark.

== 2018 ==
March 8

In Ramat Beit Shemesh, black paint was poured all over the floor of the women's section and pamphlets containing speeches given at a recent prayer rally were ruined.

May 15

In Netanya, a Masorti synagogue was targeted four times having its windows smashed and leaving members feeling scared and vulnerable. One said "we came to Israel to escape persecution and to practice and live our Jewish faith. It is hard to believe that this is happening to us in Israel.

August 14

In Petah Tikvah, the Mikdash Moshe synagogue was vandalized with Nazi graffiti.

September 12

In Rehovot, eggs were thrown on multiple occasions at women outside the Kretshnif synagogue.

November 3

In Beit Shemesh, the Beis Mordechai synagogue had its mezuzah ripped off and windows smashed.

November 9

In Ramat Hasharon, a pig's head was hung over the entrance to the Sukkat Shaul synagogue. MK Moti Yogev said his father "would not have believed he would see such an anti-Semitic sight in the State of Israel."

November 26

In Ashkelon, two synagogues were daubed with satanic symbols in the space of a month.

== 2019 ==
January 26

In Netanya, "Hail Satan" was sprayed on the walls of the Orthodox MacDonald synagogue and prayer books were burnt. The same night, Reform congregation Natan-Ya was flooded, damaging the structure, furniture and prayer books. The rabbi commented that "if this would happen in the States there would be a much bigger outcry."

January 28

In Kiryat Yovel, furniture and prayer books were damaged at the Siach Yisrael synagogue and the Torah scrolls were thrown to the floor and doused in acid. Jerusalem Mayor Moshe Leon said "I've never seen something like this. Four Torah books thrown on the ground, they simply defiled them... Such a thing can't be in Jerusalem, in the land of Israel. We know these solely from dark periods in the Diaspora." Ashkenazi Chief Rabbi of Jerusalem Aryeh Stern referred to it as a "heinous crime similar to what was witnessed at the hands of the wicked Nazis during the Holocaust." Shas chairman Aryeh Deri said "It's hard to believe how such a despicable, anti-Semitic pogrom could happen in a synagogue, here in the land of Israel." The French Ambassador expressed her shock by saying "The vandalization of the hall in memory of Jonatan Sandler, one of the victims of the anti-Semitic terror at Toulouse in 2012, is a disgrace."

May 10

In Bnei Ayish, a synagogue was set on fire and sprayed with graffiti.

May 15

In Lod, vandals caused widespread damage to an Indian-Jewish congregation.

June 9

In Bnei Brak on Shavuot night, a pack of delinquent Haredi youths stormed the Dorog Bais Medrash injuring 20 hasidim and causing considerable damage by letting off a fire extinguisher. They also targeted the Antania synagogue and the Machnovka Bais Medrash, stealing items and breaking fixtures in every building.

June 11

In Bnei Brak, four Torah scrolls were stolen from the Tiferes Shimon synagogue and other holy books were left on the floor.

July 28

In Ashkelon, an Ethiopian synagogue received a threatening letter with swastikas.

August

In Rosh Haayin, an arsonist was arrested for targeting three synagogues, including two in Petah Tikvah where several Torah scrolls were burned at the Beilinson Hospital.

August 7

In Bat Yam, anti-religious graffiti was sprayed on the wall of Heichal Yaakov, the town's oldest synagogue.

December 22

In Modi'in Illit, the Holy Ark had been broken into and suffered fire damage. Silverware from the Torah scrolls was stolen.

== 2020 ==
May 12

In Yerucham, the Holy Ark of the Tiferes Yisrael synagogue was destroyed and Torah scrolls desecrated. A similar incident occurred at the B’levav Shalem yeshivah.

== 2021 ==
March 30

Two synagogues in Ramat Gan had chametz intentionally left by their front door during Passover. A loaf of bread was found stuffed in the front door handle of one, while pieces of bread were scattered around the entrance of the other.

April 5

Two arson attacks against synagogues in Bnei Brak and Ramat Gan took place within 15 minutes of each other, one having its Holy Ark set alight.

May 11–19

Ten synagogues in Lod were burned in arson attacks by Arab rioters.

August 31

In Bnei Brak, swastikas were daubed on the side of two synagogues. Prime Minister Naftali Bennett called the vandalism "a despicable act of evil."

== See also ==
- List of attacks on Jewish institutions
