= 2026 Chabad headquarters ramming attack =

Attack in Brooklyn, New York, US

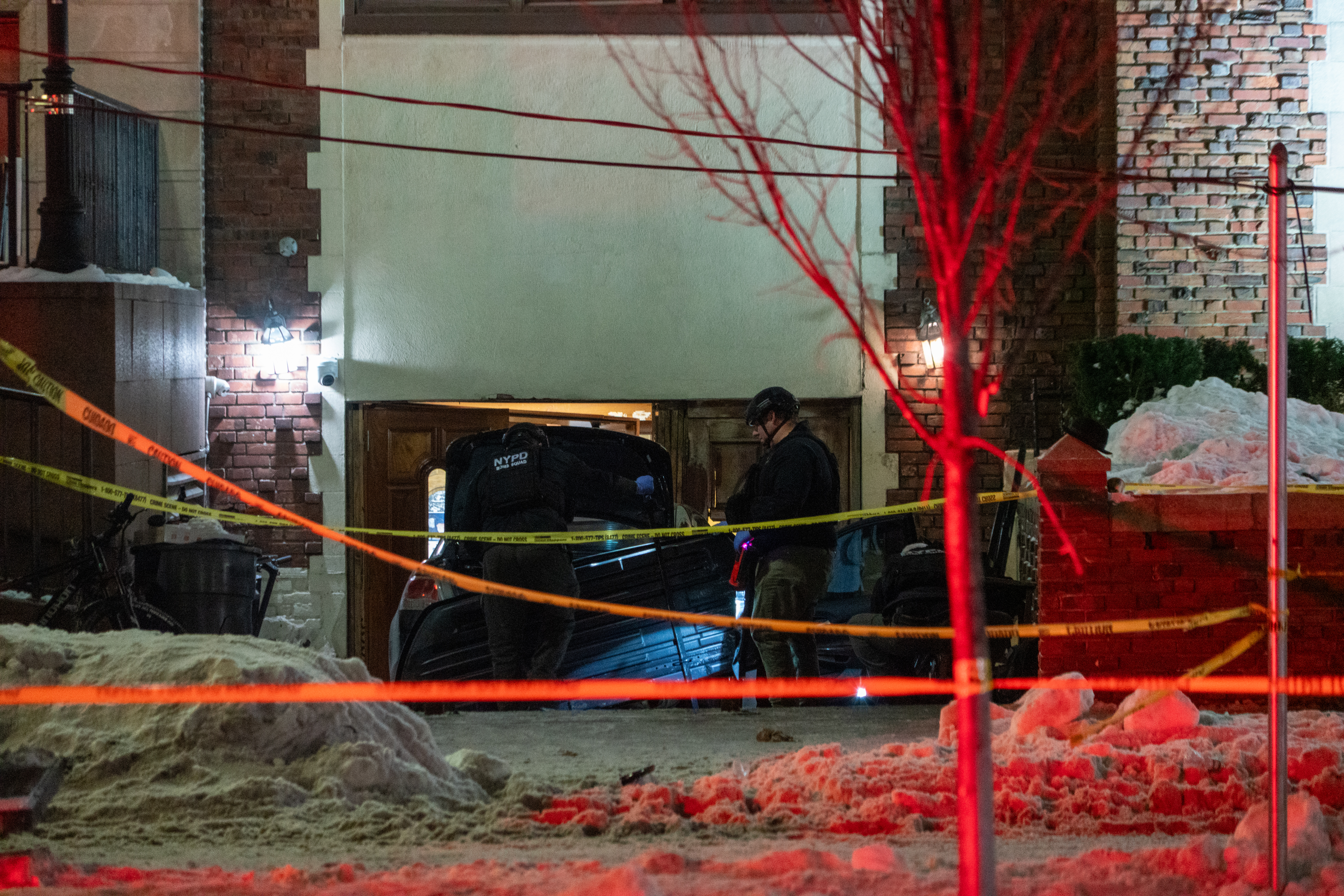
- Location: 40°40′09″N 73°56′34″W; 770 Eastern Parkway
- Date: January 28, 2026
- Attack type: Vehicle-ramming attack
- Weapon: 2011 Honda Accord
- Motive: Antisemitism (suspected)

On January 28, 2026, a man repeatedly drove a vehicle into the entrance of the Chabad–Lubavitch World Headquarters at 770 Eastern Parkway in the Crown Heights neighborhood of Brooklyn, New York City. No injuries were reported, and the driver was taken into police custody. The New York City Police Department (NYPD) and city officials described the act as deliberate, and the incident is being investigated as an antisemitic hate crime.

== Background ==
The Chabad–Lubavitch World Headquarters, or "770", is the central site of the Chabad movement. The incident occurred on a Chabad holiday known as Yud Shvat, a commemorative day celebrating the (75th) anniversary of Menachem Mendel Schneerson's assumption of leadership of the Lubavitch movement as well as the yartzeit of Rabbi Yosef Yitzchak Schneersohn, the sixth Rebbe of Chabad. Attendance at 770 on Yud Shvat is higher than normal for Farbrengens and Shiurs in honor of the day.

== Attack ==
Shortly before 9:00 p.m. local time on January 28, 2026, a man driving a 2011 Honda Accord with New Jersey license plates repeatedly struck the doors of a side entrance at the end of a basement-level driveway, while people were inside for prayer. Video of the incident shared online shows the car making multiple impacts against the entrance before police intervened. Officers who were already stationed nearby took the driver into custody at the scene. The building was evacuated as a precaution, and the New York Police Department bomb squad reportedly stated that no explosives or other weapons were found in the vehicle.

== Suspect ==
A 36-year-old man from Carteret, New Jersey, was taken into custody following the attack. The suspect claimed his "foot slipped" causing him to "[lose] control" of the vehicle. However, surveillance footage showed him removing obstacles and snow from the driveway before driving the vehicle into the building.

Authorities also stated that he had attended events at the Chabad–Lubavitch World Headquarters and was recorded interacting with congregants, actions being reviewed as part of the ongoing investigation. The individual was taken into custody and charged with multiple offenses, including attempted assault, with prosecutors indicating that hate-crime charges were under consideration because the attack targeted a religious site.

== Investigation and aftermath ==
NYPD Commissioner Jessica Tisch initially said it was being investigated as a possible hate crime, but could not say anything about the driver's motives. Authorities filed multiple charges, including attempted assault, reckless endangerment, criminal mischief, and aggravated harassment, all of which were pursued as hate crime charges because the target was a Jewish institution. Police enhanced security around houses of worship citywide following the incident.

In the aftermath of the attack, police increased patrols around Jewish institutions throughout New York City. Chabad officials stated that although the headquarter's doors were damaged, no one was injured, and religious services resumed once security checks were completed. The building was reopened early the next morning for scheduled services.

== Trial ==
On March 2, Federal prosecutors unsealed a complaint charging Dan Sohail with intentionally damaging religious property at Chabad-Lubavitch world headquarters.

Prosecutors alleged that "On Jan. 28, Sohail drove to a side entrance of the Chabad-Lubavitch World Headquarters complex, exited his vehicle and removed barriers set up to protect the site. After motioning for passersby to move away, he allegedly returned to his car and rammed the entrance. He then reversed and drove into the doorway four more times, knocking the door off its hinges."

Harmeet Dhillon, U.S. assistant attorney general for civil rights, stated – “Americans should be free to practice their faith without fearing defacement of their sacred places“ and "The Department of Justice will not tolerate attacks on houses of worship, and will vigorously prosecute those who carry them out.”

James Barnacle, assistant director in charge of the FBI New York Field Office, stated – “Sohail allegedly jeopardized dozens of lives and damaged one of our city’s sacred synagogues.”

NYPD Commissioner Jessica Tisch called Chabad Headquarters “a sacred place for many Jews in New York City and around the world.”

== See also ==
- 2025 Bondi Beach shooting – another attack on Chabad
- Antisemitism in the United States
- Vehicle-ramming attacks
- Temple Israel synagogue attack – another vehicle ramming attack at a synagogue in the United States
