= 2002 Lyon synagogue attack =

2002 antisemitic terrorist attack in Lyon, France

Coordinates: 45.7882°N 4.7914°E

On 30 March 2002, a group of masked men rammed two cars through the courtyard gates of a synagogue in the La Duchere neighbourhood of Lyon, France, then rammed one of the cars into the prayer hall before setting the vehicles on fire and causing severe damage to the synagogue.

== Attack ==
The attack took place at 1:00 am on a Saturday morning; the building was empty at the time. The attackers wore masks or hoods covering their faces, eyewitnesses reported seeing 12 or 15 attackers.

It was the first of a series of attacks on Jewish targets in France in a single week – which coincided with the holiday of Passover – including "at least" five synagogues. The targeted synagogues include the Or Aviv synagogue in Marseille, which burned to the ground; a synagogue in Strasbourg, where a fire was set that burned the doors and facade of the building before being doused; and the firebombing of a synagogue in the Paris suburb of Le Kremlin-Bicêtre.

One of the attackers was arrested and sentenced to two years in prison.

== Response ==
The French Jewish community viewed the attacks as acts of "terrorism". Maurice Obadia, President of the Jewish Community of La Duchere, said, "Nobody should try to make us believe that these are the acts of ill-at-ease delinquents, because these are the acts of terrorists." Alain Jacubowicz, a leader of the Jewish community in Lyon, described the ramming and arson attack at the Duchere synagogue as "an act of war."

Kamel Kabtane, imam of the mosque in Lyon, told a Jewish audience: "The Muslim community and all the people who came with me today want to express solidarity with you, and it denounces with you and as loudly as you do these terrorist acts that attack freedom of religion."

Prime Minister Lionel Jospin described the attack as "organized and premeditated"; he described himself as "revolted" by it and called for "respect of religions."

President Jacques Chirac called the attack "unspeakable" and "inadmissible."

Michel Miraillet, Charge d'Affaires at the Embassy of France to Israel, said stringent measures were being taken by the authorities to ensure the security of French Jews.

== See also ==
- List of attacks on Jewish institutions
