= Sacramento synagogue firebombings =

1999 antisemitic attacks

The Sacramento synagogue firebombings were attacks on three Jewish congregations in Sacramento, California — Beth Shalom, B’nai Israel, and Knesset Israel — by the white supremacist brothers Benjamin Matthew Williams and James Tyler Williams on the night of June 18, 1999.

== Aftermath ==
The Williams brothers murdered a gay couple, Gary Matson and Winfield Mowder, on July 1, and set fire to Country Club Medical Center, which housed an abortion clinic, on July 2. They were arrested for the murder on July 7.

== See also ==
- List of attacks on Jewish institutions
