= 1950s synagogue bombings =

Synagogue bombings

Between November 11, 1957, and October 14, 1958, there were five bombings and three attempted bombings of synagogues, seven in the Southern United States and one in the Midwest United States. There were no deaths or injuries.

The bombings occurred against a backdrop of increased antisemitic activity in the United States, both nonviolent and violent, after U.S. Supreme Court established that racial segregation in public schools was unconstitutional with Brown v. Board of Education in May 1954. White supremacists, such as the Confederate Underground, were opposed to Jewish support for integration and believed that integration was a Jewish plot to ruin America.

== Background ==
There was an increase in antisemitic activity in the United States, both nonviolent and violent, after U.S. Supreme Court established that racial segregation in public schools was unconstitutional with Brown v. Board of Education in May 1954. Since the decision, there were more than 80 bombings in the Southern United States.

== Bombings ==
Between November 11, 1957, and October 14, 1958, there were five bombings and three attempted bombings of synagogues, seven in the South and one in the Midwest. There were no deaths or injuries.

Despite the rise in violence against Jews in the late 1950s, authorities were slow to associate them with integration until the Confederate Underground started to take credit for the bombings, in part because the southern segregationists were not uniformly anti-Jewish. According to the strategy of segregationists like John Kasper and J. B. Stoner, black aspirations for equality were a symptom of a Jewish communist plot to ruin America.

For example, ahead of the bombing targeting the Jewish Community Center (JCC) in Nashville, Tennessee, on March 16, 1958, antisemitic literature falsely claimed that that JCC was hosting integrated community meetings.

== Reactions ==
The bombings resulted in shock and support from the local communities for the Jewish populations.

After the bombings of the Jewish centers in Nashville and Jacksonville, police learned of a possible conspiracy to bomb other Jewish centers and synagogues throughout the South.

After the Atlanta bombing on April 28, President Dwight Eisenhower directed the FBI to provide assistance to the Atlanta Police Department. Mayor of Atlanta William Hartsfield condemned the perpetrators of the bombing, calling it the "end result of demagogy".

Haydon Burns, mayor of Jacksonville, convened a conference in Jacksonville on May 5, 1958, during which police and civic officials from more than 20 cities pledged a cooperative response.

By the end of 1958, the Anti-Defamation League recognized the bombings as part of a region-wide campaign of domestic terrorism. However, the FBI still not believe it had the authority to act.

According to George Kellman, federal lawmakers considered legislative changes to curb the spread of antisemitic literature, but proposals were complicated by freedom of speech concerns.

== Legal aftermath ==
Five men associated with the National States' Rights Party were arrested and indicated for the Atlanta bombing.

Most of the bombings were unsolved.

Date	Target	Location	Details	Perpetrator
November 11, 1957	Temple Beth-El	Nashville, Tennessee	A bomb consisting of six dynamite sticks in a metal container was discovered outside the synagogue before it could explode.	
February 9, 1957	Temple Emanuel	Gastonia, North Carolina	Police discovered a container with 30 sticks of dynamite at the entrance to the synagogue.	
March 16, 1958	Temple Beth-El	Miami, Florida	A bomb exploded, causing extensive damage to the synagogue's school wing.	Anonymous caller, warning advocates of integration
March 16, 1958	Jewish Community Center	Nashville, Tennessee	At 8:07pm, a bomb exploded after a meeting at the synagogue had ended, ripping down the ceiling of the reception hall and smashing the front door and windows, causing damage estimated at $6,000 to the building. No one was injured.	Caller claiming to "bomb the integrationists" from the Confederate Union, threatening the synagogue or any other "lover of black people", including federal judge William Ernest Miller of Nashville. Miller was the judge overseeing the integration of Nashville schools.
April 28, 1958	Jewish Community Center	Jacksonville, Florida	A bomb exploded outside the building. A black school was bombed an hour later.	Caller claiming to be from the Confederate Underground, threatening the "bombings will continue until segregation is restored everywhere in the South"
April 28, 1958	Temple Beth-El	Birmingham, Alabama	A bomb with over 50 sticks of dynamite was discovered in a window-well of the synagogue, but failed to detonate due to rain.	
April 28, 1958	The Temple	Atlanta, Georgia	A bomb explosion shattered the school section of the synagogue building.	Caller claiming to be "General Gordon of the Confederate Underground"
October 14, 1958	Temple Anshei Emeth	Peoria, Illinois	A bomb caused damage to a stairwell.	Thought to be inspired by bombing at The Temple in Atlanta

== See also ==
- List of attacks on Jewish institutions in the United States
