= 2017 Gothenburg Synagogue attack =

Firebombing in Sweden

Coordinates: 57°42′20″N 11°58′21″E

The 2017 Gothenburg Synagogue attack took place on 9 December 2017 when individuals in a large gang threw firebombs at the synagogue in Gothenburg, which hosted an event with about 40 youth inside. The people inside fled to the basement but nobody was hurt. The incendiaries started a fire among the parked vehicles in the yard but the building did not catch fire. Of the about ten masked individuals at the scene, two stateless Palestinians and one Syrian was later identified and were sentenced to jail for having committed a hate crime.

== Background ==
The attack was done the day after activists in Malmö had shouted slogans about killing or shooting Jews at a demonstration.

== Aftermath ==
=== Political impact ===
The attack was condemned by National Police Commissioner Dan Eliasson. Prime minister Stefan Löfven condemned the attack as well as the antisemitic propaganda in Malmö.

=== Investigation and trial ===
The suspects could be identified using recordings by security cameras. The trial began on 12 June 2018 and prosecutor Stina Lundqvist charged the defendants with arson and antisemitic hate crime and demanded an eight-year prison sentence for each and deportation for all.

All three suspects, who were aged 19 to 24, were sentenced by the District Court of Gothenburg 25 June 2018 for having committed a hate crime, gross unlawful threat (Swedish: grovt olaga hot) and attempting to commit gross damage to property (Swedish: försök till grov skadegörelse) against the Jewish congregation and Jews in general, but did not uphold the charge of aggravated arson as the firebombs were not considered powerful enough. The main suspect was a 22-year-old asylum seeker from Gaza, but his asylum application to Sweden rejected. He received a sentence of two years in prison and deportation with an attendant ban on returning until 2028. According to the District Court of Gothenburg, the crime was serious enough to motivate deportation of all three, but the Swedish Migration Agency had given the other two perpetrators permanent residence permits. The elder of the other two accused received prison sentences of two years and the younger one year and three months. The three were born 1994, 1996 and 1999.

The prosecutor pointed out that anyone watching the security camera recordings would be in no doubt the intent was to burn down the synagogue and that the court decision had happened due to technicalities, but also expressed satisfaction that the hate crime charge had been upheld.

In July 2018, the verdict from the district court was appealed by the three suspects, who are migrants. The prosecutor also announced her intention to appeal the verdict to pursue a conviction for aggravated arson. (Swedish: grov mordbrand).

== See also ==
- Antisemitism in Sweden
- Antisemitism in the Arab world
