= Congregation Beth Israel (Gadsden, Alabama) =

Former synagogue in Gadsden, Alabama, US

Beth Israel
- Hebrew: בית ישראל
- Location of the former synagogue in Alabama

Religion
- Affiliation: Reform Judaism (former)
- Ecclesiastical or organisational status: Synagogue (1908–2010)
- Status: Inactive

Location
- Location: 761 Chestnut Street, Gadsden, Alabama
- Country: United States
- Coordinates: 34°00′51″N 86°00′39″W

Architecture
- Style: Classical Revival
- Established: 1908 (as a congregation)
- Groundbreaking: 1922
- Completed: 1923

Website
- bethisraelcongregation.org

Congregation Beth Israel (Hebrew: בית ישראל) was a Reform Jewish congregation and synagogue, located for most of its history at 761 Chestnut Street in Gadsden, Alabama, in the United States. An outgrowth of Gadsden's Jewish religious school, it was founded in 1908 and incorporated in 1910. It moved into its Chestnut Street building in 1922, and joined the Union of American Hebrew Congregations in 1924.

From 1911 to 1944 it had no rabbi, and was led by "lay-religious-leader" Hugo Hecht. In 1944, Beth Israel hired its first full-time rabbi, Ernest Appel.

The synagogue was fire-bombed and its windows smashed in 1960, during a Friday night service. Two members who rushed outside were wounded with a shotgun by the attacker, a young Nazi sympathizer.

Membership was never high; the congregation had 38 members families in 1918, and this grew to 60 families in 1960. Membership fell as major employers closed operations, and Jews emigrated from Gadsden. By 2008, family membership was down to 26. The synagogue closed in 2010.

== Early history ==
Founded in 1908, and incorporated in January 1910, Beth Israel grew out of Gadsden's Jewish religious school, which was established in 1903. Initially the congregation had no rabbi. Every second Sunday from 1910 to 1911, Ferdinand Hirsch, a student rabbi, would come to Gadsden and teach the Sunday School in the morning and hold services in the afternoon.

Hugo Hecht, a young immigrant from Germany, acted as "lay-religious-leader" from 1911 to 1944. He conducted Shabbat and funeral services, wrote sermons, taught the Sunday school, and acted as secretary and treasurer. After a number of years, officers of the temple decided he should be given a remuneration of $20/week for his work.

Membership was 38 families by 1918. The congregational school held classes weekly, and had 15 students and 3 teachers. That year the synagogue's total income was $700 (today $15,000).

Beth Israel broke ground and laid the cornerstone for its Classical Revival building at 761 Chestnut Street in March 1922, and moved in the following year. The Masonic dedication service was attended by hundreds of Gadsden citizens, and the main speaker was Reverend W. R. Rigell of the First Baptist Church. The completed structure had a stained-glass window with the Biblical verse fragment "LOVE THY NEIGHBOR AS THYSELF" (Leviticus 19:18) above the front door.

The congregation joined the Union of American Hebrew Congregations in 1924. Gadsden's Jewish community was not as badly affected by the Great Depression as others in more agriculturally-based towns, and benefited from an influx of Jewish servicemen from nearby Camp Sibert during World War II.

== Full-time rabbis ==
In 1944 Beth Israel hired its first full-time rabbi, Ernest Appel. From a long line of rabbis from Breslau, Germany (now Wrocław, Poland), Appel emigrated to the United States in 1936 as a refugee from Nazi Germany. By 1946, when he moved to a synagogue in Maryland, the congregation had grown to nearly 30 families.

After receiving ordination from Hebrew Union College, Saul J. Rubin became Beth Israel's rabbi in September, 1958. There he met and married Elsie Parsons, Hecht's granddaughter. Rubin served until 1960, when he became assistant rabbi at Congregation Beth Ahabah in Richmond, Virginia.

== Antisemitic attack ==
On March 25, (Note: Webb and the Alabama Historical Association Newsletter state that the attack was on March 25, when people were gathered for a Friday evening service. While the Institute of Southern Jewish Life gives the date as March 26. Friday evening that year was March 25.) 1960, the synagogue and its members were subject to an antisemitic attack. About 180 members were attending a Friday evening service to dedicate the new Zemurray Social Hall, and led by then-rabbi Saul Rubin and Rev. John Speaks and Dr. Franklin Denson of First Methodist Church, when windows were smashed and the synagogue fire-bombed. Two members—Alvin Lowi and Alan Cohn—who rushed out to see what was happening were met by Jerry Hunt, a 16-year-old Nazi sympathizer, who wounded them both with a shotgun, then fled. Lowi was just shot in the hand, but one of Cohn's aortas was nicked, and he almost died, requiring 22 US pints (10 L) of blood. Earlier that week Hunt had attended a rally for antisemitic and white supremacist politician John G. Crommelin, and had had a fight with a Jewish boy over a chess game at the Gadsden Community Centre.

== Decline ==
Membership peaked in 1960, at 60 families. In the 1970s and 1980s factories of major employers such as Republic Steel, and many Jewish-owned stores closed and younger members emigrated in search of employment. Following a significant period without a full-time rabbi, the congregation engaged Rabbi Arnold Fertig from 1977 to 1979. In the 1980s and early 1990s the rabbis were Fred Raskind and Mark Peilen. Family membership was still 57 in the early 1980s, but dropped to 43 in 1993, 38 in 2000, and only 26 by 2008. That year the youngest member was 48, and there were no children for the educational programs.

As of 2009, the rabbi was Scott Saulson of Atlanta, who came in once a month to provide services. A former member of the Peace Corps, graduate of Hebrew Union College, and PhD in Semitics from the University of South Africa, Saulson was also chaplain at the Atlanta Jewish Family & Career Services, and was a speaker for the Darfur Coalition of Georgia. The congregation still held services weekly, but, as was the case during most of its early history, they were lay-led.

In 2010, the congregation ceased operation. The congregation's website stated that the synagogue had closed, effective July 1, 2010.
