= Shaare Zedek Synagogue (Missouri) =

Jewish house of worship in U.S.

Shaare Zedek
- Location within St. Louis

Religion
- Affiliation: Conservative Judaism (former)
- Ecclesiastical or organizational status: Synagogue (1905–2013)
- Status: Closed in 2013 (Merged with Brith Sholom Kneseth Israel)

Location
- Location: St. Louis, Missouri
- Country: United States
- Interactive map of Shaare Zedek
- Coordinates: 38.6632°N 90.3331°W

Architecture
- Established: 1905 (as a congregation)

Shaare Zedek Synagogue was a Conservative synagogue located in St. Louis, Missouri, in the United States. Founded in 1905, the synagogue merged with Brith Sholom Kneseth Israel synagogue in 2013 to become Kol Rinah.

== Shooting ==
On October 8, 1977, guests who attended a bar mitzvah were leaving Brith Sholom Kneseth Israel synagogue when white supremacist Joseph Paul Franklin began shooting at them, killing Gerald Gordon, and wounding Steven Goldman and William Ash. In 1997, Franklin, who was now serving multiple life sentences for other crimes, was found guilty of capital murder for killing Goldman and sentenced to death. He was executed on November 20, 2013.
