= Gothenburg Synagogue =

Conservative synagogue in Göthenburg, Sweden

Göthenburg Synagogue
- Swedish: Göteborgs synagoga
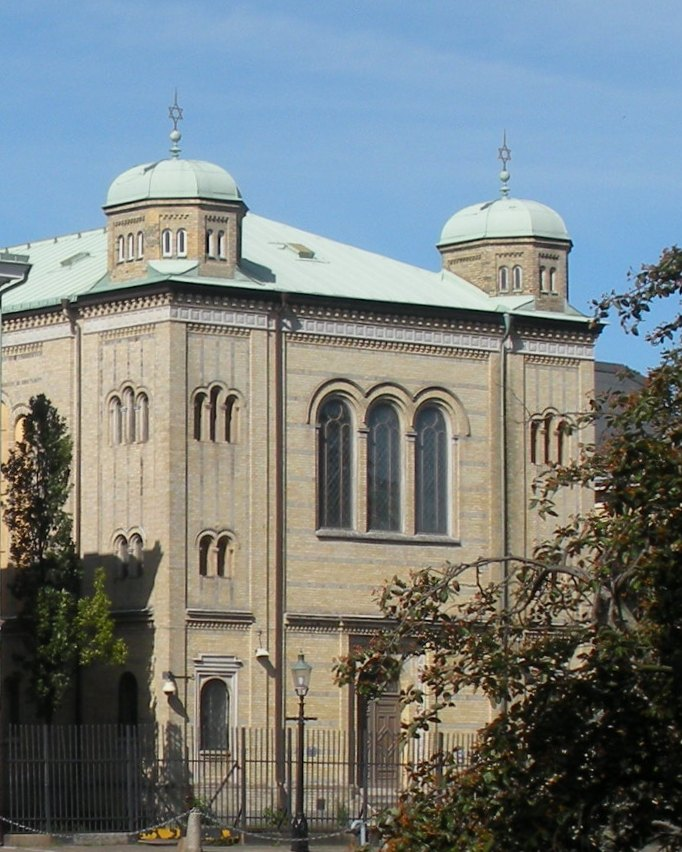
- The façade of the synagogue, in 2010

- Location of the synagogue in Västra Götaland County

Religion
- Affiliation: Conservative Judaism
- Rite: Nusach Ashkenaz
- Ecclesiastical or organizational status: Synagogue
- Status: Active

Location
- Location: Östra Larmgatan 12, near Drottningtorget, Gothenburg, Göteborg Municipality, Västra Götaland County
- Country: Sweden
- Interactive map of Göthenburg Synagogue
- Coordinates: 57°42′20″N 11°58′21″E

Architecture
- Architect: August Krüger
- Type: Synagogue architecture
- Style: Romanesque Revival
- Completed: 1855

Specifications
- Capacity: 300 seats
- Dome: Four
- Materials: Brick

Website
- judiskaforsamlingen.se/synagogan.php (in Swedish)

The Gothenburg Synagogue (Swedish: Göteborgs synagoga) is a Conservative Jewish congregation and synagogue, located at Östra Larmgatan 12, near Drottningtorget, Gothenburg, in the municipality of Gothenburg, in the Västra Götaland County of Sweden. The synagogue was designed by August Krüger in the Romanesque Revival style and completed in 1855, and has 300 seats.

The synagogue was classified as a listed building in 1999.

== History ==
Between 25 and 30% of the membership fees are used for security measures, as Jews risk attack from Middle Eastern, far-left and far-right extremists.

In December 2017, the synagogue was firebombed. Three people were arrested. Prosecutor Stina Lundqvist said about 10 to 15 people may have attacked "in concert". The attack was condemned as antisemitic by mayor Ann-Sofie Hermansson. In the aftermath of the attack, the synagogue was visited by two cabinet ministers in a show of support from the highest political level.

== See also ==
- History of the Jews in Sweden
- List of synagogues in Sweden
