= Congregation B'nai Israel (Toledo, Ohio) =

Synagogue in Toledo, Ohio, United States

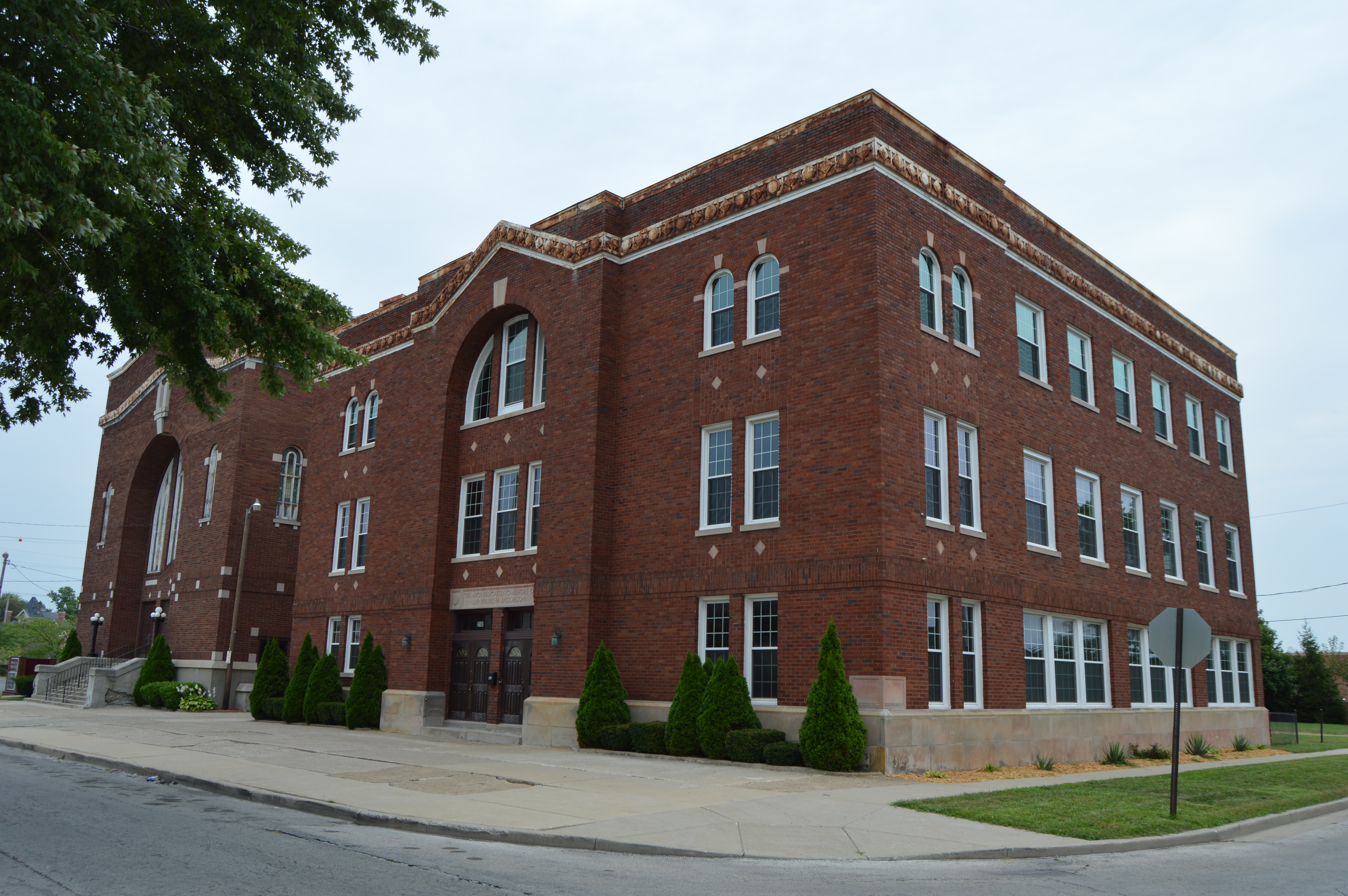

- Location in Ohio

Religion
- Affiliation: Conservative Judaism
- Ecclesiastical or organizational status: Synagogue
- Leadership: Cantor Ivor Lichterman
- Status: Active

Location
- Location: 6525 Sylvania Avenue, Sylvania, Toledo, Ohio
- Country: United States
- Interactive map of Congregation B'nai Israel
- Coordinates: 41°41′15″N 83°41′51″W

Architecture
- Established: 1866 (as a congregation)
- Completed: 1913 (12th and Bancroft Sts); 1957 (Kenwood Boulevard); 2007 (current location)

Website
- cbitoledo.org
- B'nai Israel Synagogue
- U.S. National Register of Historic Places
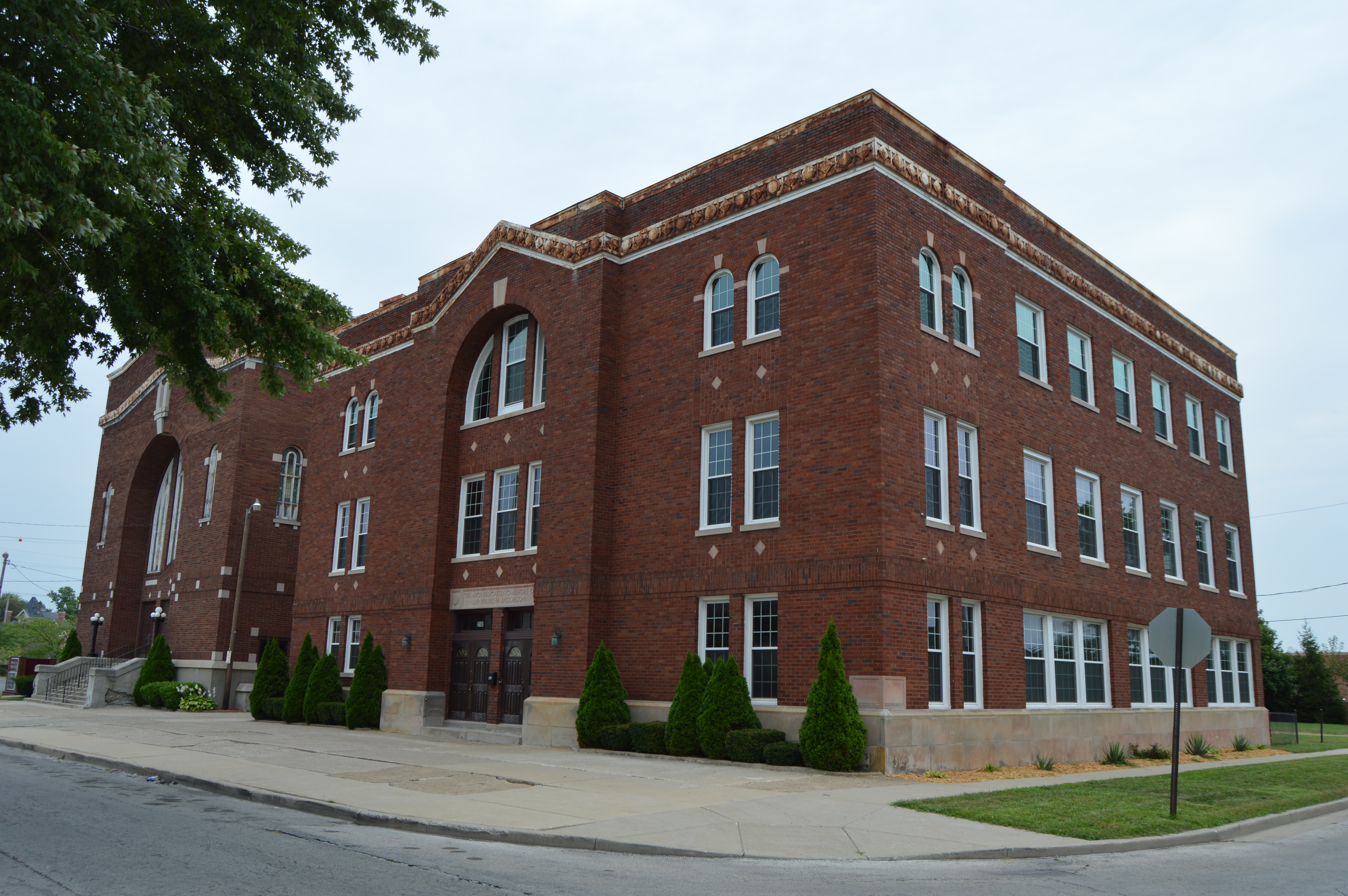
- The former synagogue complex
- Location: 2146 N. 12th Street at Bancroft Street, Toledo, Ohio
- Coordinates: 41°39′51.29″N 83°32′24.09″W
- Architect: J. G. Bullinger and Thai & Aftel
- Architectural style: Craftsman and other
- NRHP reference No.: 05001145
- Added to NRHP: October 6, 2005

Congregation B'nai Israel is a Conservative synagogue in Toledo, Ohio, in the United States. Founded in 1866, it is the oldest synagogue in Toledo.

== Synagogue buildings ==
In 1913, the congregation built its first synagogue of the corner of 12 Street and Bancroft Street. This building is now a registered historic building listed in the National Register on October 6, 2005. The congregation vacated the building in 1957 it is currently in use as a church.

The congregation moved in 1957 to a building on Kenwood Boulevard, and, in 2007 to a new synagogue located behind Shomer Emunim, a Reform synagogue, located adjacent to Sylvania Avenue.
