= Shafrir synagogue shooting =

1956 attack on Israeli civilians by Palestinian Arab fedayeen

- Part of Palestinian Fedayeen insurgency
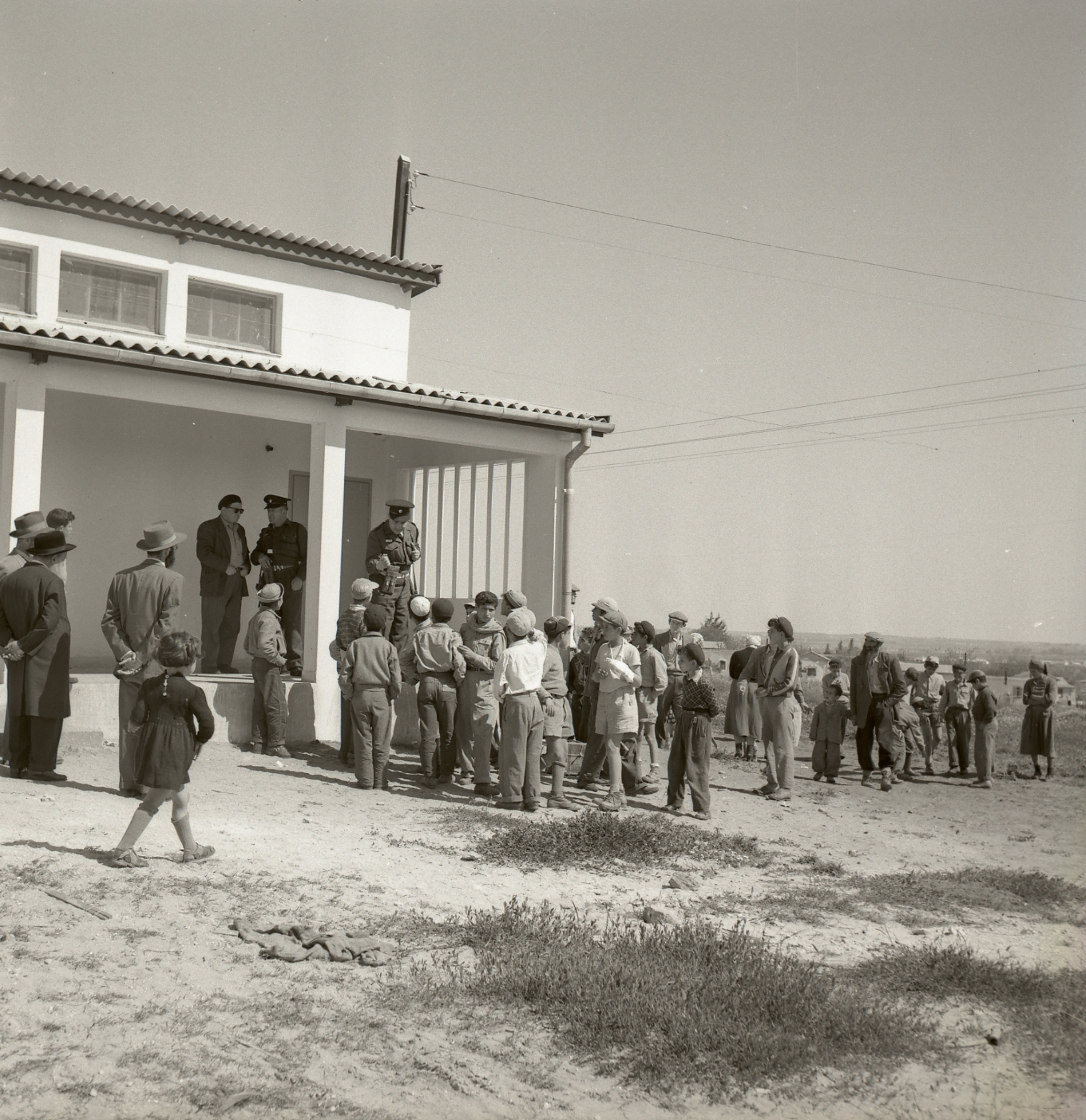
- Kfar Chabad shortly after the mass shooting

- The attack site
- Native name: הטבח בבית הספר למלאכה, רצח יד החמישה
- Location: 31°59′13″N 34°50′42″E; Kfar Chabad, Israel
- Date: 11 April 1956; 70 years ago c. 20:00 pm (UTC+2)
- Attack type: Mass shooting
- Deaths: 6 civilians (including 5 children)
- Injuries: 20 civilians
- No. of participants: 3

The Shafrir synagogue shooting was a terrorist attack which was carried out by Palestinian militants on 11 April 1956. Three Palestinian militants who crossed into Israel from Egypt attacked the study hall of a synagogue while it was full of children and teenagers, in the farming community of Kfar Chabad (Shafrir). Six people (five children and a youth worker) were killed.

== Attack ==
A Palestinian Arab fedayeen squad entered Israel from Egypt. They came to the village of Kfar Chabad (Shafrir) during the evening of 11 April 1956, which at the time was mainly inhabited by refugees from the Soviet Union. One waited by the escape vehicle, another cut the electricity to the synagogue, plunging the interior into darkness, and the third entered the synagogue and fired into the crowd of 46 children aged 9–16 inside at the time. Five boys and their 24-year old instructor Simcha Zilberstrom were killed. Five children were injured, three of them in serious condition. One teacher named Yeshayahu Gopin threw children out the window during the shooting, saving several lives. A group of village men gathered firearms kept in a small defense locker and rushed to the school, arriving about five minutes after the attack began, but by that time, the shooting had stopped and the perpetrators had made their escape. The police were called with the village's only telephone, and the only two vehicles in the village were used to take the wounded to the nearby Tzrifin Medical Center.

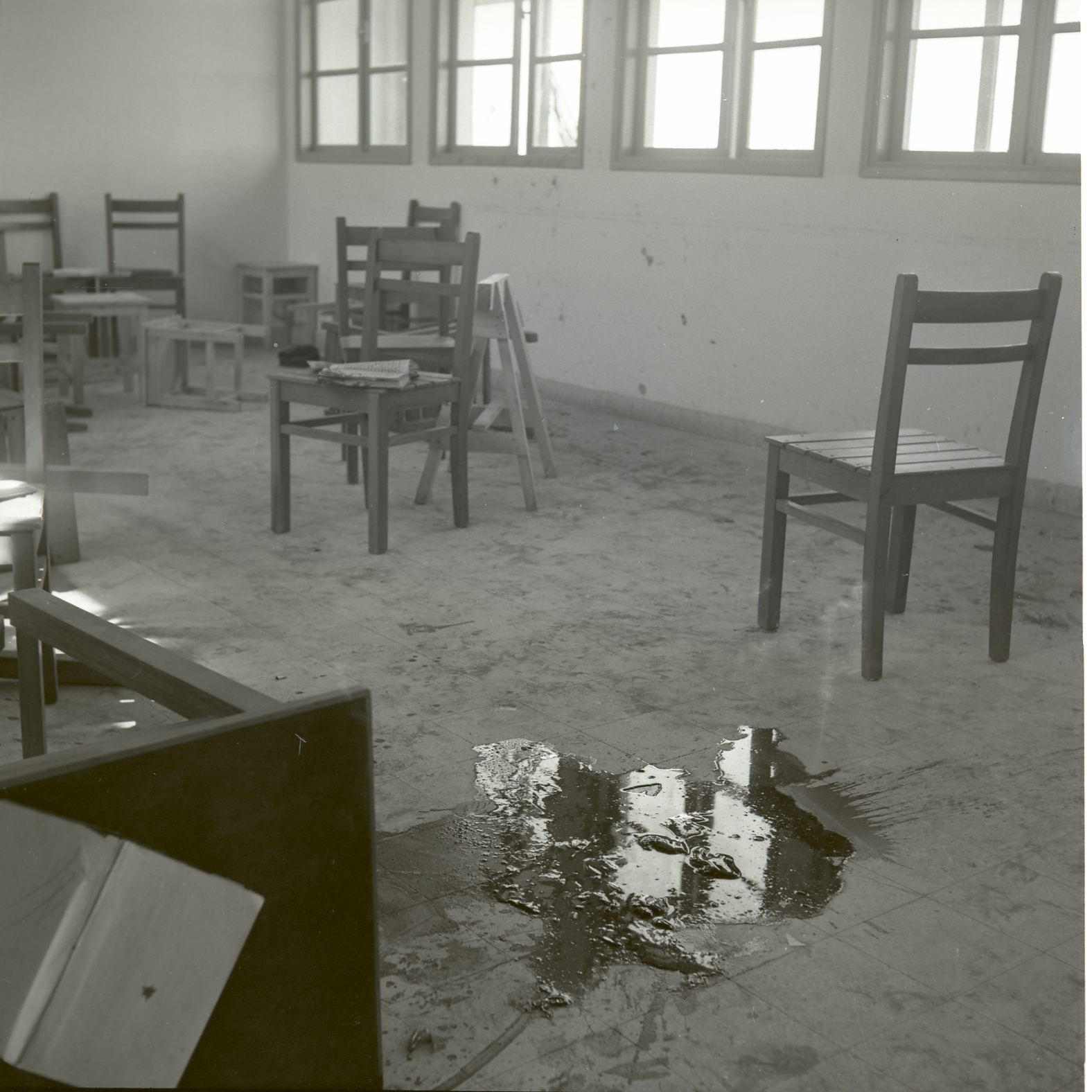
Bloodstained classroom

== Aftermath ==
Following the attack, the traumatized villagers began to seriously consider abandoning the settlement. The Lubavitcher Rebbe, Rabbi Menachem Mendel Schneerson, was consulted and responded that they should remain and continue to build.

The incident shocked the Israeli public. Newspapers reported on the attack and the despondent national mood in its aftermath for days. Herzl Rosenblum wrote in Yediot Ahronoth that "Entering the school's modest synagogue was like visiting Kishinev after the pogrom of 50 years ago." The day following the attack, Israeli Foreign Minister Moshe Sharett sent an urgent message to United Nations Secretary-General Dag Hammarskjöld informing him on the latest fedayeen raids and highlighting the attack on Kfar Chabad. Speaking to delegates of the United Nations Security Council, Israel's United Nations ambassador Abba Eban condemned the "murder of Israeli children and their instructor in the sacred moment of prayer." At the end of the traditional thirty-day mourning period for the victims, thousands of people from across Israel attended the cornerstone laying ceremony for a new vocational school in the village, including numerous political figures and Israel's two chief rabbis.

== See also ==
- Poway synagogue shooting
- Death of Zvi Kogan
