= 2026 Temple Israel attack =

Terrorist attack in Michigan, US

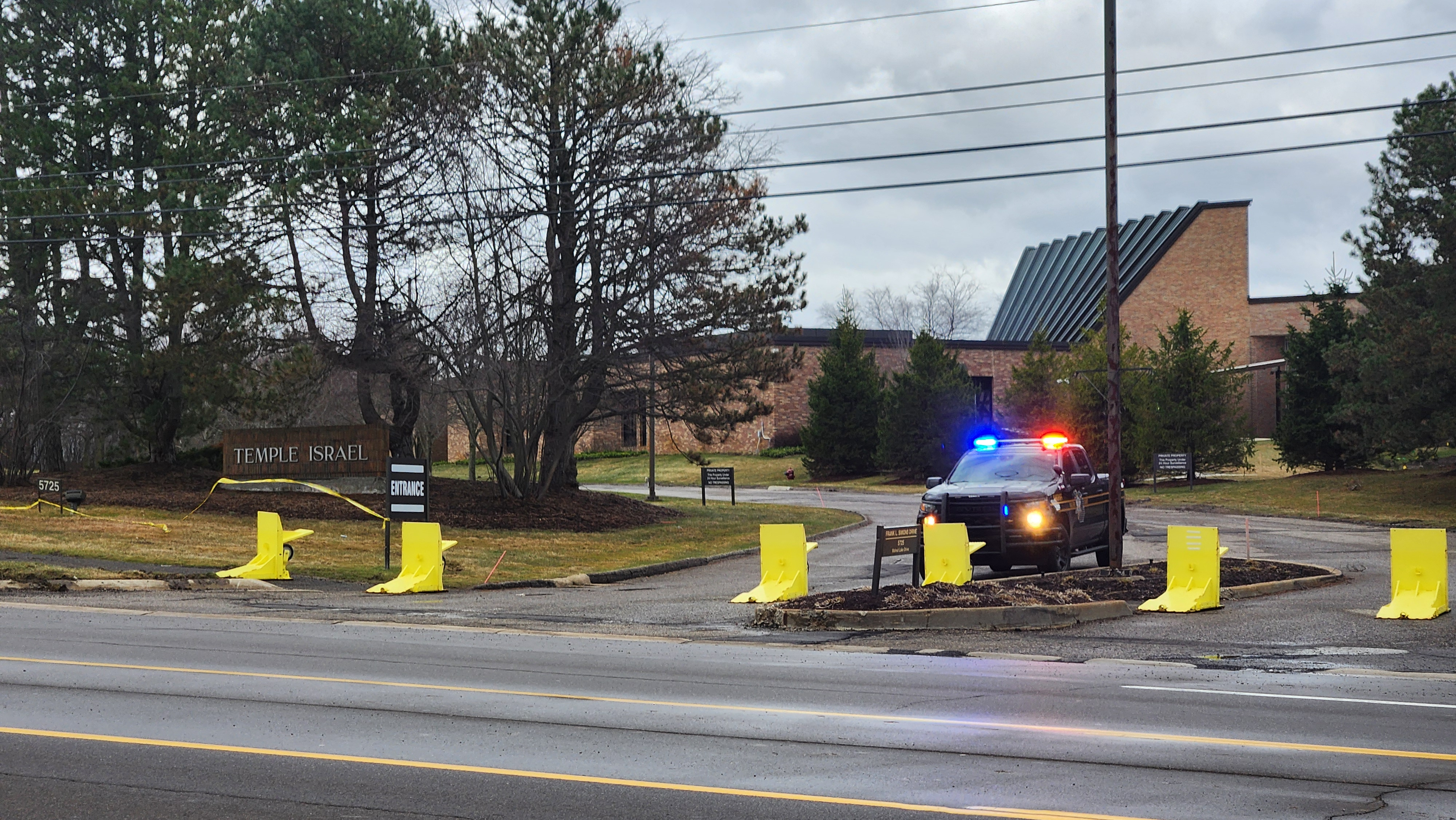
- Entrance to Temple Israel the day after the attack
- Location: 42.55482°N 83.39577°W; Temple Israel; 5725 Walnut Lake Road; West Bloomfield Township, Michigan, US
- Date: March 12, 2026; 12:19 p.m. (EDT)
- Target: Temple Israel
- Attack type: Vehicle-ramming attack, school shooting, shootout, terrorism
- Weapons: Ford F-150; AR-15–style rifle; Fireworks
- Deaths: 1 (the perpetrator)
- Injuries: 64 (1 security officer, 63 law enforcement officers)
- Perpetrator: Ayman Mohamed Ghazali
- Motive: Hezbollah-inspired terrorism; Revenge for the killing of family members during the 2026 Lebanon war

On March 12, 2026, a shooting and vehicle-ramming terrorist attack occurred at Temple Israel, a Reform synagogue in West Bloomfield Township, Michigan, United States. 41-year-old Ayman Mohamed Ghazali rammed his vehicle into the building and opened fire before he died by suicide. The vehicle caught fire, possibly from something flammable inside, and severely burned Ghazali's body. One security guard was struck and injured by the vehicle and 63 law enforcement officers were transported to hospitals to be treated for smoke inhalation.

Four members of Ghazali's family – his two brothers, his niece, and his nephew – were killed in an Israeli airstrike during the 2026 Lebanon war on March 5. On March 15, the Israel Defense Forces (IDF) alleged that his brother Ibrahim Muhammad Ghazali, who was killed in the attack, was a commander in Hezbollah within a specialized branch of the Badr unit. The attack was determined by the Federal Bureau of Investigation (FBI) to have been a Hezbollah-inspired act of terrorism against the Jewish community.

== Background ==
Established in 1941 with 600 families as members, Temple Israel's first permanent home was constructed in the Palmer Park neighborhood of Detroit, and its current 100,000-square-foot (9,300 m^{2}) facility was constructed in 1980 in West Bloomfield, Michigan. With 3,500 member families and 12,000 members in 2026, the congregation describes itself as "the nation's largest Reform synagogue".

In the years after World War II, thousands of Holocaust survivors came to live in the area. In 1984, the community established the nation's first standalone Holocaust museum, in walking distance from Temple Israel. The museum moved from its original location in 2004 and is now named The Zekelman Holocaust Center.

The Jewish Federation of Detroit said a pattern of rising regional and national antisemitism existed prior to the attack.

== Attack ==
Before carrying out the attack, Ghazali waited at the synagogue's parking lot for more than two hours. Shortly before 12:19 p.m. EDT, he drove his Ford F-150 pickup truck into the front entrance of the synagogue. The attacker drove the vehicle through the doors and down the hall, striking a guard, who was the congregation's director of security, after which the truck burst into flames. The vehicle jammed in the hallway, preventing Ghazali from exiting it, after which two armed security guards exchanged fire with Ghazali, shooting through his windshield and rear window.

Reports indicated that Ghazali opened fire with a rifle after crashing his vehicle, and that ambulances and other emergency vehicles were on site. During the shootout, the truck's glove compartment caught on fire. Ghazali, still in the vehicle, committed suicide by a gunshot to his head. Smoke billowed from the building from the fire and caused heavy damage, and Ghazali's body was badly burned. Other security officers took the injured guard to a nearby hospital, and he is expected to survive. Sixty-three law enforcement officers were treated for smoke inhalation. Henry Ford Health reported that its medical teams were caring for eight injured first responders, though the nature of their injuries was not provided.

An on-site school at Temple Israel was in session with more than 100 students and a staff of 50, who had been trained on dealing with incidents on-site by barricading doors and preparing evacuation routes. Children were carried out of windows by police and staff and brought to Shenandoah Country Club, where they were reunited with their parents. Due to a water main break in surrounding Oakland County, the water pressure had to be closely monitored during the fire fighting response as much of the township's water was being redirected to Commerce Township and Wixom. To prevent the fire fighters from losing water pressure, personnel were stationed at the connections to Commerce Township to shut off supply if needed.

== Perpetrator ==
Authorities identified the perpetrator as 41-year-old Ayman Mohamed Ghazali (January 4, 1985 – March 12, 2026), a Lebanese-born US citizen and a Hamido Restaurant worker from Dearborn Heights, Michigan. On March 5, a drone strike conducted by the Israeli military in Machghara, his home town, killed Ghazali's brothers, Kassim and Ibrahim, and Ibrahim's children Ali and Fatima (Ayman's nephew and niece), as part of the 2026 Lebanon war at their home.

Initial reports citing law enforcement officials said Ghazali was flagged in government databases for his contact with suspected Hezbollah members, but was not said to have been a member himself. The FBI later stated he was not on the federal terrorist watchlist, and was not the subject of or referenced in any prior FBI investigation. He had been living in Michigan since he entered the United States on an IR1 immigrant visa as the spouse of a US citizen in 2011, after both alien relative and fiancé petitions were approved. Ghazali applied for naturalization in 2015 and was granted US citizenship in 2016.

Authorities confirmed that Ghazali posted several images of his relatives who were killed in the Israeli attacks on WhatsApp in the hours before the attack. Wayne County Circuit Court confirmed that Ghazali's ex-wife filed for divorce in 2024, and that it was granted the following year. Two minutes after Ghazali attacked Temple Israel, his ex-wife called police to report that he had just called her and told her to "send money overseas" and that she feared he was suicidal because four of his family members had recently been killed in an Israeli airstrike in Lebanon. When asked if she knew if Ghazali had weapons at home, she said she didn't know and said that "The way that he was talking to me, he was telling me to take care of my family in Lebanon".

A US official provided a picture to CBS News that Ghazali had sent to a family member in Lebanon on the day of the attack. The picture featured Ghazali holding the AR-15–style rifle he used in the attack edited with verses from the Quran on it in yellow text. The text read in Arabic: "Among the believers are men who have been true to what they pledged to God. Some of them have fulfilled their vow, and some are still waiting. They have never changed," and the lower text referenced "vengeance".

== Aftermath ==
Michigan State Police warned of an active shooter and nearby residents and schools sheltered-in-place. Police departments in Michigan and across the country ramped up efforts to protect religious institutions and patrols were increased at houses of worship and schools. On March 18, police body camera video of officers evacuating children and searching Temple Israel for threats after the attack was released.

Rabbi Josh Bennett said that Temple Israel suffered major water and smoke damage from the attack and the sprinklers that turned on in response to the fire. The temple also launched a fundraising campaign to raise funds to repair the damage caused by the attack.

== Investigation ==
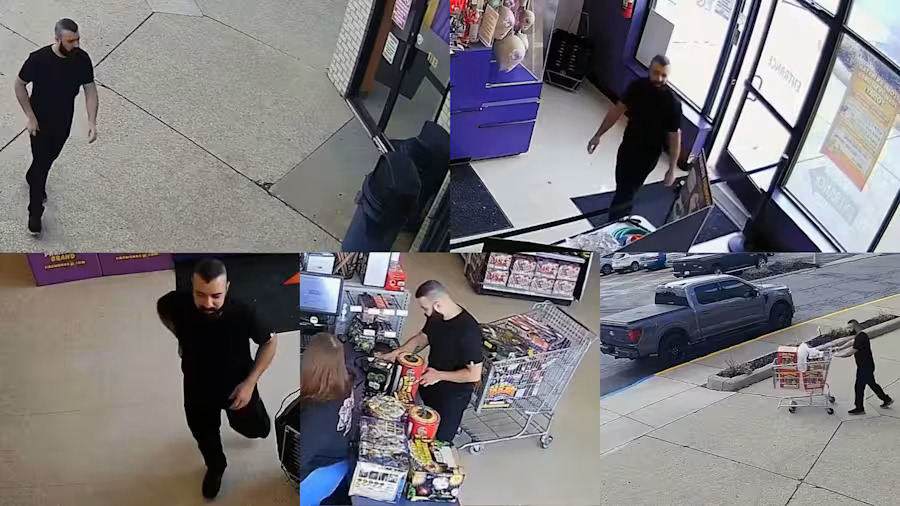
Ghazali purchasing the fireworks

Law enforcement officers briefed on the scene reported that responders found "what appeared to be a large amount of explosives in the vehicle." FBI agent Jennifer Runyan later confirmed that fireworks and flammable liquid, likely gasoline, were discovered in the truck's bed. The Bureau of Alcohol, Tobacco, Firearms and Explosives confirmed they are also investigating. Investigators determined that Ghazali purchased about $2,200 worth of fireworks two days before the attack from a Phantom Fireworks store in Livonia, Michigan. FBI director Kash Patel stated that FBI personnel were working with local law enforcement officials on the incident.

FBI special agent Jennifer Runyan disclosed on March 30 that the attack was a Hezbollah-inspired act of terrorism against the Jewish community. Runyan said that there was no indication that Ghazali had any accomplices in the attack. Runyan also said that Ghazali had begun searching for Hezbollah and Iran-aligned news outlets in January 2026 and on March 9, Ghazali attempted to purchase weapons from two different individuals before he was able to acquire the AR-15–style rifle he used in the attack along with 10 magazines and approximately 300 rounds of .223 ammunition. Ghazali also began searching online for firework vendors and visited multiple Jewish websites based in Michigan. The next day, Ghazali continued his research, searching terms such as "largest gathering of Israelis in Michigan" before purchasing the fireworks and visited a shooting range. The day before the attack, on March 11, Ghazali created a Facebook album which he named "vengeance", which included pictures of Ali Khamenei, his deceased relatives, and others. In the morning of the day of the attack, Ghazali uploaded more photos of his deceased relatives and left comments such as "we will seek retribution for their sacred blood" and wrote that Israel was pure evil.

Shortly before carrying out the attack against Temple Israel, Ghazali sent a video to his sister in Lebanon in which he said that he was at the "largest gathering of Israelis in the state of Michigan"; that he had "booby-trapped the car"; and that he would enter the synagogue, shoot the people inside, and "kill as many of them as I possibly can". According to Runyan, Ghazali's sister didn't see the video until about an hour after the attack.

== Reactions ==
External videos
- Press briefing with Oakland County Sheriff Michael Bouchard and West Bloomfield Police Chief Dale Young, March 12, 2026, C-SPAN
- Press briefing with Gov. Gretchen Whitmer and Sen. Elisa Slotkin, March 13, 2026, C-SPAN
- Press briefing with FBI Special Agent in Charge Jennifer Runyan, March 13, 2026, C-SPAN

=== International ===
On March 15, spokesperson for the IDF, Avichay Adraee, said that on March 5, the IDF had attacked a "military building" and "eliminated a commander in Hezbollah’s anti-tank missile unit", which he identified as Ghazali's brother Ibrahim Muhammad Ghazali, and called the Temple Israel attacker a "terrorist". Adraee said that the IDF had carried out the airstrike because the building housed "large quantities of weapons" and that "terrorist elements were active" at the location.

The mayor of Machghara, Iskander Barakeh, where the perpetrator was from, said that he feared that Lebanese Americans from the town would face retaliation in the United States because of the attack and that, "Everybody deserves to live in peace". Ghazali's maternal uncle, who lived down the street from Ghazali's family members killed in the airstrike at their home in Machghara, said that he helped retrieve their bodies from the rubble. The uncle said that Ghazali attacked the synagogue to avenge the airstrike, and several people interviewed by NPR in Machghara said that they would want to avenge the killing of their family as well. A soccer coach for one of the killed brothers said that he understood Ghazali's anger, but said that it was not an excuse to attack innocent people, going on to say, "We're not against Jews as Jews," but rather, "We are against the Israelis who are killing us daily". A Hezbollah official told The New York Times that Ghazali had attacked Temple Israel in revenge for the killings of his family, but denied that any of the perpetrator's family was affiliated with Hezbollah.

=== Government ===
==== National ====
President Donald Trump said after the attack that he had been fully briefed on the attack and said that it was "a terrible thing" and that it was "absolutely incredible that things like this happen". Vice President JD Vance called the attacker a "terrorist" and said that the attack was "something that all of us have to stand up and say, it's disgusting, it's unacceptable and we're not going to tolerate in the United States of America". Vance also expressed support for the security guard who was struck by the attacker, saying that he was a hero and represented the "very best of this country".

The state's US Senators responded, with Gary Peters saying that "All Americans should feel safe where they pray, work, and live. Antisemitism has no place in our society and we all must come together to condemn this horrible violence," while his fellow Senator Elissa Slotkin said that "All communities deserve the right to worship safely. All communities. And acts of terror and antisemitism must be condemned and dealt with to the fullest extent of the law."

US representative Haley Stevens, who represents the area where Temple Israel is located, released a statement after the attack in which she thanked first responders and wrote that "It is no longer enough for our leaders to condemn antisemitism" and that antisemitism must be "rooted out everywhere". The attack also triggered responses from other US representatives across the country, such as Randy Fine of Florida, who posted to X after the attack, "We need more Islamophobia, not less. Fear of Islam is rational". Fine's post prompted Mark Pocan of Wisconsin to post in response that Fine was an "awful fucking idiot" and that Fine "needs to be deported". Andy Ogles of Tennessee wrote on X, "Name one country that is freer and safer because Muslims moved there".

==== State ====
Michigan governor Gretchen Whitmer stated "Yesterday's attack was antisemitism. It was hate, plain and simple" and that "Michigan's Jewish community should be able to live and practice their faith in peace." Lieutenant Governor Garlin Gilchrist stated that "Violence targeted toward the Jewish community, or any community of faith is unacceptable and has no rightful place in Michigan."

Michigan state representative Noah Arbit, who attends Temple Israel, said that an attack to happen at his synagogue was his "worst nightmare" and called on Whitmer to create an Office of Hate Crime and Political Violence Prevention. Arbit added that Jewish people were being blamed for the war in Iran and that "Anti-Jewish rhetoric becomes anti-Jewish violence very quickly". Arbit also accused Democratic candidate for US Senate in Michigan, Abdul El-Sayed, of crying "crocodile tears" in response to the attack and said El-Sayed had "done more than most to stoke & inflame hatred against Jews" because it was "a very small logical leap from 'AIPAC controls the US government,' 'Israel is committing genocide,' 'Zionists kill Arab babies' to 'kill Jews in West Bloomfield'".

==== Local ====
The mayor of Dearborn Heights, Mo Baydoun, where the perpetrator of the attack lived, said that "Our Jewish brothers and sisters deserve to worship without fear" and that the fact that the perpetrator had recently lost family members in an Israeli airstrike in Lebanon was not an "excuse for violence, especially for violence directed at a sacred space". These remarks by the mayor drew backlash online, as Baydoun failed to divulge that the attacker also had family in Hezbollah.

Oakland County sheriff Michael Bouchard requested that people "take a breath and balance their need to share video with how it impacts the victims and the investigation" during a press conference with faith leaders and other local law enforcement. During the press conference, Bouchard also shared a manipulated image that someone created of him featuring a Star of David edited onto his forehead and payot added near his ears, stating that "Some pond scum felt empowered and emboldened enough to put this picture of me up to try to threaten and intimidate me" and "if this person is emboldened and empowered enough or feel safe enough to do this for me, what does he do to a kid? What does he do to a Jewish family walking down the street?" Bouchard also said that he had received complaints after the attack that his agency had "sent too many people" in response to the attack at Temple Israel, to which he responded that "if you think we sent too many people, turn off the TV. We're going to send what we need to send to stop the threat, protect the people and make sure the situation is made safe".

During the press conference, Bouchard noted that the man who created the Star of David image of him had been arrested in Wisconsin. This sparked online backlash from far-right activists, such as Jake Shields, who claimed that Bouchard was Jewish and that the man had been arrested for "pointing out that a sheriff is jewish [sic]". A Florida-based coffee company, which markets itself towards right-wing customers, called for Bouchard to be "fired and imprisoned". Bouchard and the Oakland County Sheriff's Office responded by clarifying that the man had been arrested for having a felony warrant for aggravated stalking. During a national security briefing with the Secure Community Network on March 24, Bouchard played a voicemail he had received in which someone said, "Put your gun in your mouth and kill yourself." Bouchard said that he was "stunned" by the amount of backlash he had received and that "we struck a nerve with a lot of folks" who were using the First and Second Amendments to "hide their antisemitism, their hate, their prejudice and things that are disgusting".

=== Non-government ===
The Jewish Federation of Detroit said that it remained "steadfast in our commitment to vigilance and security, even as we continue to live proud, vibrant Jewish lives – at our temples and synagogues, in our schools, and throughout our Jewish organizations". The CEO of the Jewish Federation of Detroit, Steve Ingber, announced that $1 million was available through private donations to give grants to more than 50 Jewish organizations for security investments. Ingber also said that he was working with other Jewish leaders to lobby for additional funding. Congregation T'chiyah Rabbi Alana Alpert said that all people deserve the right to "walk safely down the streets of our neighborhoods and through the doors of our holy spaces", and that "Anytime someone blames or conflates all Jewish people – including kids at their school – with the state or government of Israel, that is dangerous and antisemitic, and it leads directly to violence against us". Alpert also said that the conflation of Jewish people and Israel also included statements by President Donald Trump and Israeli prime minister Benjamin Netanyahu.

Lex Eisenberg of the Jewish Voice for Peace Detroit said that the organization was "broken-hearted in the wake of a horrible attack" and that it was becoming "increasingly clear that the Israeli government's atrocities make all people, including Jews, less safe". Eisenberg also wrote that "The Israeli government carries out wars and genocide against families and children, and then falsely claims these war crimes are done in the name of Jews" which then leads to more antisemitism. The founder of Rabbis for Ceasefire, Alissa Wise, said that attacks on Jews caused by violence in the Middle East was her "worst fear" and that "On one hand, you want to say it's a synagogue so it's an antisemitic attack, but at the same time you understand that Israel deliberately conflates Jewishness with support for Israel's actions, and you also have a synagogue that supports that project". The Guardian reported that Temple Israel had hosted Israel Defense Force soldiers, an IDF recruiter who wasn't recruiting at the synagogue, and had held prayers for the IDF and partnered with Friends of the Israel Defense Forces.

Osama Siblani, the publisher of The Arab American News and chairman of the Arab American Political Action Committee, said that there "is no place for such a horrific crime in our society" and that the local Arab American community "fully and unequivocally condemns the attack on our friends and neighbors in the Jewish community and their houses of worship". The Michigan chapter of the Council on American-Islamic Relations condemned the violence and said that it was "thankful that there was no loss of life from the congregants, including the children who were present" and that there was "no justification" to attack a place of worship or religious institution. The Arab American Civil Rights League released a statement which condemned the attack and expressed solidarity with the Jewish community. On March 15, a secretary for the Islamic Institute of America in Dearborn Heights said that the mosque had held a service for the family members of Ghazali who were killed in the Israeli airstrike.

On March 19, Temple Israel officials released photos of the damage from the attack on Facebook to "take back control of our narrative". In the post, the officials wrote that the videos and photos that had been shared on social media had "caused considerable harm to the survivors of last week's attack", and they were sharing the images so that they could "be the ones to tell its story".

Following backlash to a story in which National Public Radio (NPR) interviewed Ghazali's uncle in Lebanon and residents of Ghazali's hometown following the attack in which the article described Ghazali's hometown as having strong connections to Hezbollah, NPR editor Kelly McBride released an article on NPR which partially discussed NPR's coverage of the Temple Israel attack. In the article, McBride wrote that the interview was conducted by NPR reporter Hadeel Al-Shalchi and in the original version of the story, NPR reported that the IDF had not responded to NPR about why the Ghazali family home was struck, but after the story was released the IDF responded and the article was updated appropriately to reflect that. McBride wrote that the purpose of the story was to document and humanize the slain family, and not an attempt to justify Ghazali's attack.

Democratic candidate for US Senate in Michigan, Abdul El-Sayed, posted to X that he was "horrified and heartbroken" by the attack and later posted a video in which he referenced the recent deaths of Ghazali's family, saying "I'll never forget one of the simplest lessons I learned while on my psychiatry rotation in medical school: hurt people hurt people. Violence is a cycle." and that "One can have righteous anger with the state of Israel while expressing solidarity with the Jewish people, including Jewish people in Israel". On August 29, El-Sayed revisited his "hurt people hurt people" comment, and issued an apology to the Jewish Democratic Caucus about it. El-Sayed spoke to reporters after the apology, saying that, "My comments may have been misconstrued to justify something I did not mean to justify", and "To anyone who feels like my comments might have been hurtful, I’m really sorry. That was not my intention".

== See also ==
- Crime in Michigan
- 2025 Grand Blanc Township church attack, a similar attack where the perpetrator rammed a vehicle into a house of worship before opening fire
- 2026 Old Dominion University shooting, a school shooting that occurred the same day
