= Timeline of antisemitism in the 20th century =

This timeline of antisemitism chronicles the facts of antisemitism, hostile actions or discrimination against Jews as a religious or ethnic group, in the 20th century. It includes events in the history of antisemitic thought, actions taken to combat or relieve the effects of antisemitism, and events that affected the prevalence of antisemitism in later years. The history of antisemitism can be traced from ancient times to the present day.

For events specifically pertaining to the expulsion of Jews, see Jewish refugees.

In the late 19th and early 20th centuries, the Roman Catholic Church adhered to a distinction between "good antisemitism" and "bad antisemitism". The "bad" kind promoted hatred of Jews because of their descent. This was considered un-Christian because the Christian message was intended for all of humanity regardless of ethnicity; anyone could become a Christian. The "good" kind criticized alleged Jewish conspiracies to control newspapers, banks, and other institutions, to care only about accumulation of wealth, etc. Many Catholic bishops wrote articles criticizing Jews on such grounds, and, when accused of promoting hatred of Jews, would remind people that they condemned the "bad" kind of antisemitism.

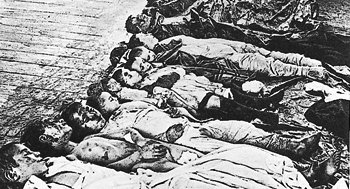
The victims of a 1905 pogrom in Yekaterinoslav

== 1900s ==
1902
During the funeral of New York's Chief Rabbi Jacob Joseph, employees of R. Hoe & Company, who had been harassing local Jews for some time, threw water, paper, wood, and iron from the upper floors of the factory at 504 Grand Street onto the mourning procession.
1903
The Kishinev pogrom. 49 Jews murdered.
1903
The first publication of The Protocols of the Elders of Zion hoax in St. Petersburg, Russia (by Pavel Krushevan).
1904
The Limerick boycott was an economic boycott waged against the small Jewish community in Limerick, Ireland. It was accompanied by a number of assaults, stone throwing and intimidation, which caused many Jews to leave the city.
1905
Pogrom in Yekaterinoslav. 66 Jews were killed and 125 wounded and Jewish homes and shops were looted.
1905
The 1905 Kiev pogrom was a massacre of 100 Jews.
1905
The second Kishinev pogrom. 19 Jews murdered and 56 wounded.
1906
Alfred Dreyfus was exonerated and reinstated as a major in the French Army.
1907
Over 60 Jews in the Mellah of Casablanca are killed in a pogrom by Kabyle Muslims. Many more were wounded, and a large number of women and children were carried off.
1909
Salomon Reinach and Florence Simmonds refer to "this new antisemitism, masquerading as patriotism, which was first propagated at Berlin by the court chaplain Stöcker, with the connivance of Bismarck." Similarly, Peter N. Stearns comments that "the ideology behind the new anti-Semitism [in Germany] was more racist than religious."

== 1910s ==
1910
The 1910 Shiraz blood libel was a pogrom of the Jewish quarter in Shiraz, Iran. It was sparked by accusations that the Jews had ritually murdered a Muslim girl. By the end of the pogrom, 12 Jews were killed, 50 or so were wounded, and 6,000 were robbed of all their possessions.
1912
The Tritl or the 1912 Fez massacre left 42 Moroccan Jews dead.
1913
The blood libel trial of Menahem Mendel Beilis in Kiev.
1915
In one 48-hour interval in May 1915, all 40,000 Jews living in Kaunas, Lithuania are forcibly removed from the city.
1915
The Leo Frank trial and lynching in Atlanta, Georgia turns the spotlight on antisemitism in the United States and leads to the founding of the Anti-Defamation League.
1917
The 1917 Jaffa deportation was a forceful expulsion and confiscation of property of 10,000 Jews from Jaffa and Tel Aviv by Ottoman authorities.
1917–1921
Attacked for being revolutionaries or counter-revolutionaries, unpatriotic pacifists or warmongers, religious zealots or godless atheists, capitalist exploiters or bourgeois profiteers, masses of Jewish civilians were murdered in pogroms in the course of Russian Civil War (by various estimates 70,000 to 250,000, the number of orphans exceeded 300,000).
1918
3,000–10,000 Mountain Jews are killed during March Days.
1918
The Lwów pogrom of 1918 was an attack on the Jewish population of Lwów that took place on 21–23 November 1918 during the Polish–Ukrainian War. After the pogrom was over, an estimated 52–150 Jewish residents were killed and hundreds were injured.
1919
The Kiev pogroms of 1919 were a series of pogroms in various places around Kiev carried out by White Volunteer Army troops. There were a total of 1,326 pogroms across Ukraine around that time, in which between 30,000 and 70,000 Jews were massacred. According to some estimates, the pogroms left half a million Jews homeless. The series of events occurred in the following districts:
1919
The Pinsk massacre was the mass execution of thirty-five Jewish residents of Pinsk on 5 April 1919 by the Polish Army.
1919
In February 1919 a brigade of UNR troops killed 1500 Jews in Proskurov.
1919
In Tetiev on 25 March 1919, Cossack troops under the command of Colonels Cherkovsky, Kurovsky and Shliatoshenko murdered 4,000 Jews.
1919–1920
During the Russian Civil War the Jews of Uman in eastern Podolia were subjected to two pogroms in 1919, as the town changed hands several times. The first pogrom, in spring, claimed 170 victims; the second one, in summer, more than 90. This time the Christian inhabitants helped to hide the Jews. The Council for Public Peace, with a Christian majority and a Jewish minority, saved the city from danger several times. In 1920, for example, it stopped the pogrom initiated by the troops of General Denikin.
1919–1922
Soviet Yevsektsiya (the Jewish section of the Communist Party) attacks Bund and Zionist parties for "Jewish cultural particularism". In April 1920, the All-Russian Zionist Congress is broken up by Cheka led by Bolsheviks, whose leadership and ranks included many anti-Jewish Jews. Thousands are arrested and sent to Gulag for "counter-revolutionary... collusion in the interests of Anglo-French bourgeoisie... to restore the Palestine state." Hebrew language is banned, Judaism is suppressed, along with other religions.

== 1920s ==
1920
The Jerusalem pogrom of April 1920 of old Yishuv.
1920
The idea that the Bolshevik revolution was a Jewish conspiracy for the world domination sparks worldwide interest in a fabricated text, The Protocols of the Elders of Zion. In a single year, five editions are sold out in England alone. In the US Henry Ford prints 500,000 copies.
1920
In the spring of 1920, Henry Ford made his personal newspaper, The Dearborn Independent, chronicle what he considered the "Jewish menace". Every week for 91 issues, the paper exposed some sort of Jewish-inspired evil major story in a headline. The most popular and aggressive stories were then chosen to be reprinted into four volumes called The International Jew.
1921
All Jews in Mongolia are massacred by Russian anti-Bolshevik forces commanded by Baron von Ungern-Sternberg with one known survival Baron Zanzer.
1921
Jaffa riots in Palestine.
1921–1925
Outbreak of antisemitism in United States, led by Ku Klux Klan.
1922
Soviet Yevsektsiya (the Jewish section of the Communist Party) attacks Bund and Zionist parties for "Jewish cultural particularism". In April 1920, the All-Russian Zionist Congress is broken up by Cheka led by Bolsheviks, whose leadership and ranks included many anti-Jewish Jews. Thousands are arrested and sent to Gulag for "counter-revolutionary... collusion in the interests of Anglo-French bourgeoisie... to restore the Palestine state." Hebrew language is banned, Judaism is suppressed, along with other religions.

1922
The government of Yemen, under Yahya Muhammad Hamid ed-Din, re-introduced an Islamic law entitled the "orphans decree". The law dictated that if Jewish boys or girls under the age of 12 were orphaned, they were to be forcibly converted to Islam, their connections to their families and communities were to be severed, and they had to be handed over to Muslim foster families.

1923
Der Stürmer (pronounced [deːɐ̯ ˈʃtʏʁmɐ], lit. "the Attacker") was a weekly tabloid-format Nazi newspaper published by Julius Streicher (a prominent official in the Nazi Party) from 1923 to the end of World War II, with brief suspensions in publication due to legal difficulties. It was a significant part of Nazi propaganda and was vehemently antisemitic.
1924
The National Origins Quota of 1924 and Immigration Act of 1924 largely halted immigration to the U.S. from Eastern Europe and Russia; this was meant to restrict Eastern European Jews among others, as a great many of these immigrants coming from Russia and Eastern Europe were Jews (the "outbreak of antisemitism" mentioned in the above entry may have also played a part in the passage of these acts).
1925
Pogrom against jews in Oran where 2 jews are killed and 50 injured by a Muslim mob.
1925
The Ku Klux Klan in Prophecy is a 144-page book written by Bishop Alma Bridwell White in 1925 and illustrated by Reverend Branford Clarke. This book primarily espouses White's deep fear and hatred of the Roman Catholic Church while also promoting antisemitism, racism against African Americans, white supremacy, and women's equality.
1925
Adolf Hitler publishes Mein Kampf.
1927
The Schwartzbard trial was a sensational 1927 French murder trial that resulted in a mistrial of international proportions. At the trial Sholom Schwartzbard was accused of murdering the Ukrainian immigrant and head of the Ukrainian government-in-exile Symon Petlura in Paris. While the defendant fully admitted to the crime the trial at the end turned in accusation of Petlura's responsibility for the massive 1919–1920 pogroms in Ukraine in which Schwartzbard had lost all 15 members of his family. Instead of Schwartzbard's murder case the trial was turned into a political case against the Ukrainian government. Schwartzbard was acquitted.
1928
The Massena blood libel was an instance of blood libel against Jews in which the Jews of Massena, New York, were falsely accused of the kidnapping and ritual murder of a Christian girl in September 1928.
1929
The ancient Jewish community of Hebron is massacred by local Muslims over rumors that the Jews were planning to seize control of the Temple Mount.
1929
18–20 Jewish residents of Safed were brutally killed in the 1929 Palestine riots.

== 1930s ==
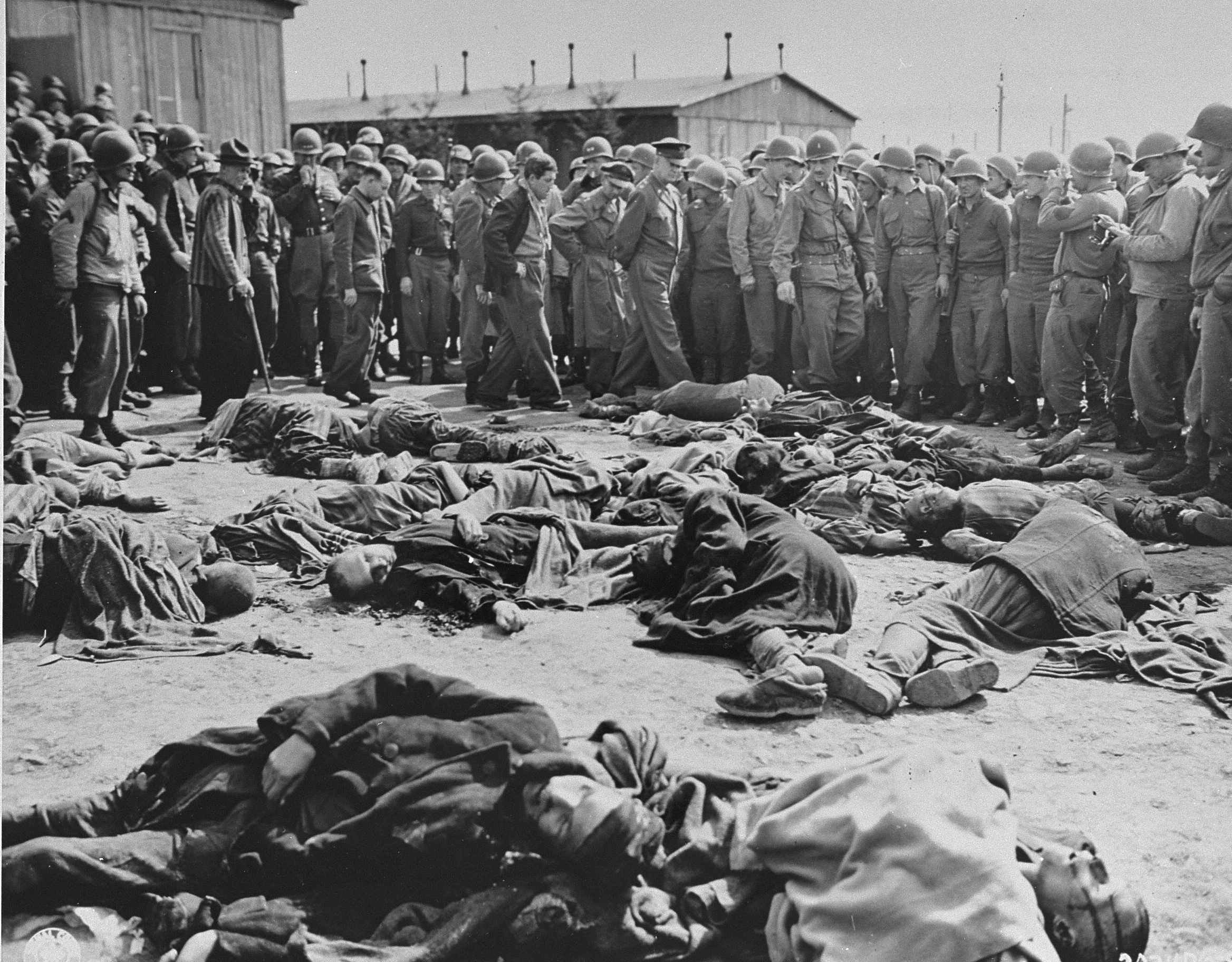
General Eisenhower inspecting prisoners' corpses at a liberated concentration camp, 1945

1930
Pogrom against the Jews of Bălți.
1933, 16 August
Christie Pits riot takes place in Toronto, Ontario.
1933
In a series of lectures delivered at the University of Virginia in 1933, published under the title After Strange Gods: A Primer of Modern Heresy (1934), T.S. Eliot wrote of societal tradition and coherence, "What is still more important [than cultural homogeneity] is unity of religious background, and reasons of race and religion combine to make any large number of free-thinking Jews undesirable." Eliot never re-published this book/lecture.:
1933–1941
Persecution of Jews in Germany rises until they are stripped of their rights not only as citizens, but also as human beings. During this time antisemitism reached its all-time high.
- Law against Overcrowding of German Schools and Universities
- Law for the Reestablishment of the Professional Civil Service (ban on professions)
- The Reich Flight Tax is used to expropriate funds from Jewish émigrés.
1933
Pogrom against the jews of Aden. Beatings outside the jewish quarter and looting of Jewish homes.

1934
2,000 Afghani Jews are expelled from their towns and forced to live in the wilderness.

1934
The 1934 Thrace pogroms were a series of violent attacks that occurred in Tekirdağ, Edirne, Kırklareli, and Çanakkale. Over 15,000 Jews had to flee from the region.

1934
34 Algerian Jews were killed and hundreds were injured by Muslim mobs during the 1934 Constantine pogrom. 200 Jewish stores were raided, the total property damage was estimated at over 150 million Poincare francs. It also sent a quarter of Constantine's Jewish population into poverty.
1934
The first appearance of The Franklin Prophecy on the pages of William Dudley Pelley's pro-Nazi weekly magazine Liberation. According to the US Congress report:

"The Franklin "Prophecy" is a classic antisemitic canard that falsely claims that American statesman Benjamin Franklin made anti-Jewish statements during the Constitutional Convention of 1787. It has found widening acceptance in Muslim and Arab media, where it has been used to criticize Israel and Jews..."

1934
In his 1934 pageant play The Rock, T.S. Eliot distances himself from Fascist movements of the thirties by caricaturing Oswald Mosley's Blackshirts, who 'firmly refuse/ To descend to palaver with anthropoid Jews'. The "new evangels" of totalitarianism are presented as antithetical to the spirit of Christianity.
1935
Nuremberg Laws introduced. Jewish rights rescinded. The Reich Citizenship Law strips them of citizenship. The Law for the Protection of German Blood and German Honor:
- Marriages between Jews and citizens of German or kindred blood are forbidden.
- Sexual relations outside marriage between Jews and nationals of German or kindred blood are forbidden.
- Jews will not be permitted to employ female citizens of German or kindred blood as domestic servants.
- Jews are forbidden to display the Reich and national flag or the national colors. On the other hand, they are permitted to display the Jewish colors.
1936
The Bloody Day in Jaffa refers to various violent attacks on Jews in Jaffa by mobs of Muslims.
1936
The Przytyk pogrom was an altercation between Jewish and Polish peasants, ending with two Jews and one Pole dead.
1936
Cardinal August Hlond, as Primate of Poland issued a pastoral letter on Catholic moral principles. The long (5600-word) letter covered Catholic ethics policy, ethics principles and a section on "sins" (Z Naszych Grzechów) that addressed Christian shortcomings to love one's neighbours in accordance with God's law. The latter section included a brief discussion of the "Jewish problem" (Problem żydowski): "So long as Jews remain Jews, a Jewish problem exists and will continue to exist (...) It is a fact that Jews are waging war against the Catholic church, that they are steeped in free-thinking, and constitute the vanguard of atheism, the Bolshevik movement, and revolutionary activity. It is a fact that Jews have a corruptive influence on morals and that their publishing houses are spreading pornography. It is true that Jews are perpetrating fraud, practicing usury, and dealing in prostitution. It is true that, from a religious and ethical point of view, Jewish youth are having a negative influence on the Catholic youth in our schools." Hlond tempered these remarks with an admission that "not all Jews are this way" and forbade assaults on Jews or attacks on their property. Yet, despite a warning to Catholics not to take an anti-Jewish moral stance, interspersed in the letter's words of friendship was an explicit condemnation of Jewish culture and also Judaism for its rejection of Jesus Christ: "It is good to prefer your own kind when shopping, to avoid Jewish stores and Jewish stalls in the marketplace (...) One should stay away from the harmful moral influence of Jews, keep away from their anti-Christian culture, and especially boycott the Jewish press and demoralizing Jewish publications. (...) We do not honor the indescribable tragedy of that nation, which was the guardian of the idea of the Messiah and from which was born the Savior. When divine mercy enlightens a Jew to sincerely accept his and our Messiah, let us greet him into our Christian ranks with joy." Hlond's letter was criticized by Polish Jewish groups who saw it as offering support and a rationalization for antisemitism. What also caught the attention of historians was the remark about not hating anyone, "not even Jews", implying "not even enemies". Were Jews to be loved as neighbors or enemies? However, while Hlond promoted the expulsion of German civilians after World War II, he had always consistently condemned the Nazi persecution of the Jews.
1937
"The Eternal Jew" was the title of an exhibition of degenerate art (entartete Kunst) displayed at the Library of the German Museum in Munich from 8 November 1937 to 31 January 1938. The exhibition attracted 412,300 visitors, over 5,000 per day.
1938
Ecuador issues an order that states all Ecuadorian Jewish residents not working in agriculture need to leave the country.
1938
Anschluss, pogroms in Vienna, anti-Jewish legislation, deportations to Nazi concentration camps.
- Decree authorizing local authorities to bar Jews from the streets on certain days
- Decree empowering the justice Ministry to void wills offending the "sound judgment of the people"
- Decree providing for the compulsory sale of Jewish real estate
- Decree providing for the liquidation of Jewish real estate agencies, brokerage agencies, and marriage agencies catering to non-Jews
- Directive providing for the concentration of Jews in houses
1938 July 6–15
Evian Conference: 31 countries refuse to accept Jews trying to escape Nazi Germany (with the exception of Dominican Republic). Most find temporary refuge in Poland. See also Bermuda Conference.
1938
Arab rioters rush into the Jewish Kiryat Shmuel neighborhood, killing 19 Jews, 11 of whom were children in the 1938 Tiberias massacre.
1938
Father Charles E. Coughlin, a Roman Catholic priest, starts antisemitic weekly radio broadcasts in the United States.
1938
Kristallnacht (Night of The Broken Glass). In one night most German synagogues and hundreds of Jewish-owned German businesses are destroyed. Almost 100 Jews are killed, and 10,000 are sent to concentration camps.
1938
Racial legislation introduced in Italy. Anti Jewish economic legislation introduced in Hungary.
1938
Der Giftpilz is a children's book published by Julius Streicher in 1938. The title is German for "the toadstool" or "the poisonous mushroom". The book was intended as antisemitic propaganda. The text is by Ernst Hiemer, with illustrations by Philipp Rupprecht (also known as Fips).
1939
The "Voyage of the damned": S.S. St. Louis, carrying 907 Jewish refugees from Germany, is turned back by Canada, Cuba and the US. After they were denied entry to those places, the refugees were finally accepted in various European countries, including Belgium, the Netherlands, the UK, and France. Historians have estimated that approximately a quarter of them were murdered in death camps during World War II.
1939
In this year Ezra Pound returned to Italy from the States and began writing antisemitic material for Italian newspapers. He wrote to James Laughlin that Roosevelt represented Jewry, and signed the letter with "Heil Hitler".
1939
Linen from Ireland is a 1939 German drama film that was part of an ongoing campaign of antisemitism in German cinema of the era, and it also attacked Britain with whom Germany was at war by the time of the film's release.
1939
Robert and Bertram is a 1939 German musical comedy film; it was the only antisemitic musical comedy released during the Nazi era.
1939 February
The Congress of the United States rejects the Wagner-Rogers Bill, an effort to admit 20,000 Jewish refugee children under the age of 14 from Nazi Germany.
1939–1945
The Holocaust. About 6 million Jews, including about 1 million children, systematically killed by Nazi Germany and other Axis powers. See also Holocaust denial.

== 1940s ==
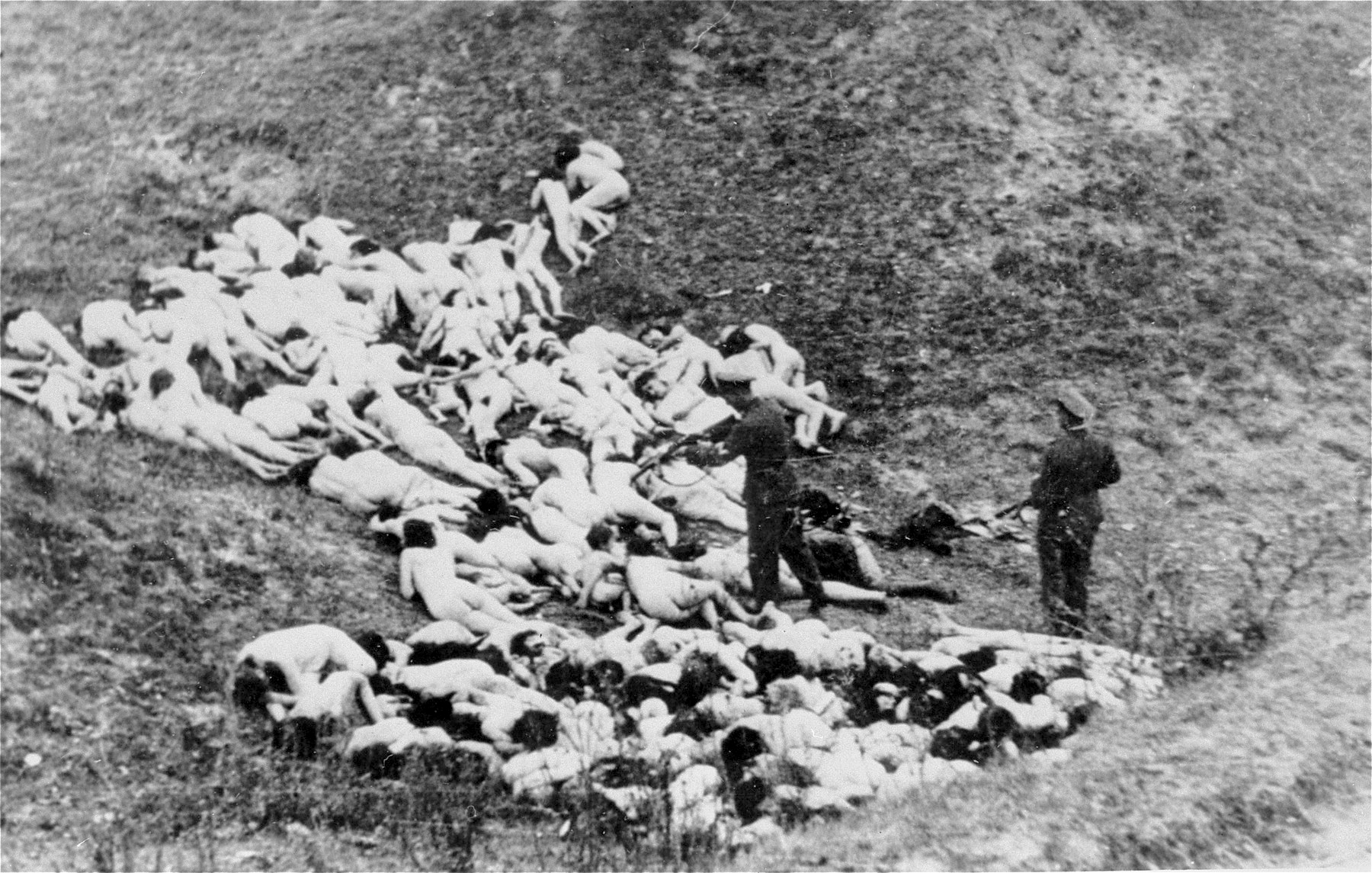
German police shooting women and children from the Mizocz Ghetto, 14 October 1942

1940
On 16 May 1940 the Administrasjonsrådet asked Rikskommisariatet why radio receivers had been confiscated from Jews in Norway. That Administrasjonsrådet thereafter "quietly" accepted racial segregation between Norwegian citizens, has been claimed by Tor Bomann-Larsen. Furthermore, he claimed that this segregation "created a precedent." Two years later (with NS-styret in the ministries of Norway) Norwegian police arrested citizens at the addresses where radios had previously been confiscated from Jews.
1940
In the Vichy regime: 10 July 1940 – Pierre Laval induces Parliament to vote complete powers (constituent, legislative, executive and judicial) to Marshal Philippe Pétain who becomes Head of state of the French State (État français). 21 July 1940 – Minister of Justice Raphaël Alibert creates a board to review 500,000 naturalizations accorded since 1927. Withdrawal of nationality for 15,000 people, 40% of whom were Jews. July 1940 – The Germans expel more than 20,000 Alsace-Lorraine Jews to the southern zone. 27 September 1940 – Ordinance on the status of Jews in the Occupied Zone. A census of Jews ("the Tulard file") and obligatory sign indicating "Jew" on shops owned by Jews. 27 September 1940 – A Vichy law allows any foreigner "redundant to the French economy" to be interned among "groups of foreign workers". 3 October 1940 – first law on the status of Jews. French Jewish citizens are excluded from civil service, army, education, the press, radio and film. "Surplus" Jews are excluded from the professions. Article 9: This law is applicable to Algeria, to the colonies, protectorates and mandated territories. 4 October 1940 – prefects can detain foreigners of Jewish extraction in special camps or to assign residence. 7 October 1940 – repeal of the 18.71 billionémieux Decree; French nationality is removed from Jews from Algeria. 7 October 1940 – Aryanization of businesses in the Occupied Zone.
1940
Jud Süß is a 1940 Nazi propaganda film produced by Terra Filmkunst at the behest of Joseph Goebbels, and considered one of the most antisemitic films of all time. The film has been characterized as "one of the most notorious and successful pieces of antisemitic film propaganda produced in Nazi Germany." It was a great success in Germany, with some 20 million viewers. Although the film's budget of 2 million Reichsmarks was considered high for films of that era, the box office receipts of 6.5 million Reichsmarks made it a financial success. Heinrich Himmler urged members of the SS and police to watch the movie.
1940
The Rothschilds is a 1940 German film directed by Erich Waschneck. It portrays the role of the Rothschild family in the Napoleonic Wars. The Jewish Rothschilds are depicted in a negative manner, consistent with the antisemitic policy of Nazi Germany.
1940
Vom Bäumlein, das andere Blätter hat gewollt is a short antisemitic propaganda cartoon produced in 1940 in the Nazi movie studio Zeichenfilm GmbH.
1940
The Eternal Jew (1940) is an antisemitic German Nazi propaganda film, presented as a documentary.
1941
The Farhud pogrom in Baghdad results in 780 Jews dead, over 1,000 wounded.
1941
Gabès pogrom in French Tunisia leaves 8 Jews dead and at least 20 wounded.
1941
Iași pogrom in Iași city was the incident where more than 13,266 Jews were killed by angry mobs of locals, and together with military personnel they exterminated about 1/3 of Jewish population in Romania.
1941
Encouraged by the Nazis, Ukrainian militias and local mobs perpetrated the Lviv pogroms, killing around 6,000 Polish Jews.
1941
Some villagers in Jedwabne, Poland burned at least 340 local Jews alive.
1941
Nazis and their collaborators shot to death 33,771 Jews at Babi Yar over the course of two days.
1941
German forces and Latvian collaborators killed around 5,000 Jews in the Liepāja massacres.
1941
In a speech at an America First rally at the Des Moines Coliseum on 11 September 1941, Charles Lindbergh accused American Jews of exercising "large ownership and influence in our motion pictures, our press, our radio, and our government" and of conspiring to make the United States join World War II.
1941
Collaboration of the Vichy regime with the Holocaust: 29 March 1941: creation of the Commissariat-General for Jewish Affairs (CGQJ), with Xavier Vallat as the first commissioner. 11 May 1941 – Creation of the French Institute for Jewish Affairs, an antisemitic propaganda agency, financed by the Nazis (Theodor Dannecker) and directed by French antisemitic agitators Paul Sézille (fr), René Gérard (fr) and others. 14 May 1941 – the Billet Vert roundup (fr) organized by the Prefecture of Police with the agreement of the general delegation of the French government in the occupied zone and upon demand by the occupying authorities: 3,747 Jewish foreigners, (out of 6,494 summoned by the prefecture) were crammed into the Pithiviers and Beaune-la-Rolande internment camps under French administration. 2 June 1941 – second law concerning Jews. Compared to the first one, an increasingly stringent definition of who is a Jew, additional professional work restrictions, quotas in University (3%) and the liberal professions (2%). Jews were obligated to take part in a census in the Zone libre. Article 11 of the Statute: "This law is applicable to Algeria, the colonies, protectorates and territories under mandate. This law authorizes prefects to perform administrative detention of Jews of French nationality." 21 July 1941 – Aryanization of Jewish companies in the Zone libre. August 1941: Occupied zone: internment of 3,200 foreign and 1,000 French Jews in various camps including Drancy. December 1941 – Occupied zone: 740 French Jews, members of the liberal and intellectual professions, interned in Compiègne.
1942
In January the Wannsee Conference takes place in Berlin. Nazi officials define the practical arrangements for the "Final Solution", that is to say, the complete extermination of European Jewry, including children.
1942
The Antisemitic Exhibition in Zagreb took place in the Art Pavilion in Zagreb, the capital city of the Independent State of Croatia (NDH), in May 1942. According to its organizers, the exhibition sought to expose the "destructive and exploitative work of Croatia's Jews prior to 1941."
1942
Jews of Benghazi are attacked. German and Italian troops fighting the Allies in North Africa occupied the Jewish quarter of Benghazi, plundered shops and deported jews to concentration camps.
1942
"In the concentration camp at Uzice, in Serbia, 280 Jewish internees and 100 Serbians were executed, the Yugoslav sources disclose. Among the Jews who were shot were many women and children and two aged men, Dr. Guttman and M. Levy.":
1942
"In a concentration camp in Croatia eight Jewish supervisors were executed on charges of aiding the guerillas (Yugoslav partisans), when 340 Jewish prisoners, including 42 young girls, escaped from the camp and succeeded in reaching the mountain stronghold of the Serbian force."
1942
Collaboration of the Vichy regime with the Holocaust: 27 March 1942 – The first convoy of Jewish deportees leaves Compiègne (Frontstalag 122) towards an extermination camp. 20 May 1942 – Occupied zone: Compulsory wearing of yellow Jewish star badge. (effective 7 June). 2 July 1942 – Oberg-Bousquet agreement for collaboration between French and German police, in the presence of Reinhard Heydrich, Heinrich Himmler's deputy. 16–17 July 1942 – Roundup of the Vel d'Hiv: arrest of 13,152 "stateless" Jews (3,031 men, 5,802 women and 4,051 children). 19 July 1942 – failed Roundup of Nancy (fr), after Jews were warned overnight to flee by Nancy Police Commissioner for Foreign Affairs Édouard Vigneron. 26–28 August 1942 Zone libre – series of roundups resulting in the deportation of 7,000 people.
1943
Vienna 1910 is a 1943 German biographical film directed by Emerich Walter Emo and starring Rudolf Forster, Heinrich George and Lil Dagover. It is based on the life of Mayor of Vienna Karl Lueger. Its antisemitic content led to it being banned by the Allied Occupation forces following World War II.
1943
Forces occultes is a French film of 1943 that virulently denounces Jews, Freemasonry, and parliamentarianism as part of the Vichy regime's drive against them and seeks to prove a Jewish-Masonic plot.
1943
Collaboration of the Vichy regime with the Holocaust: January 1943 – Roundup of Marseille: destruction of the Old Port and roundups by French authorities. Nearly 2,000 Marseilles Jews arrested and deported. Le Petit Marseillais of 30 January 1943 wrote: "Note that the evacuation operations in the Northern district of the Old Port were carried out exclusively by French police and that no incidents were reported. The Opera district, where many Sephardic families lived, is emptied of its inhabitants. February 1943 – Lyon raid on the premises of the Union générale des israélites de France (UGIF, General Organization of Jews in France). September 8, 1943 – surrender of Italy leading to the Allied occupation of Italian-occupied France hitherto spared the roundups. April 1943 – Nîmes and Avignon roundups. September 1943 – roundups of Nice and surrounding area."
1943
The Bermuda Conference was an international conference between the United Kingdom and the United States held from 19 April 1943, through 30 April 1943, at Hamilton, Bermuda. The topic of discussion was the question of Jewish refugees who had been liberated by Allied forces and those who still remained in Nazi-occupied Europe. The only agreement made was that the war must be won against the Nazis. US immigration quotas were not raised nor was the British prohibition on Jewish refugees seeking refuge in the British Mandate of Palestine lifted.
1944
Collaboration of the Vichy regime with the Holocaust: February 1944 – roundups of Grenoble and Isère. 15 August 1944 – last deportation convoy from Clermont-Ferrand.
1945
The 1945 Tripoli pogrom was a violent massacre of the Jewish population of Tripoli by Muslim rioters. After days of violence 140+ Jews were dead and hundreds were injured. In the aftermath 4,000 Jews were left homeless and thousands were reduced to poverty. 9 Synagogues were destroyed, along with thousands of Jewish homes and businesses.
1945
The 1945 Anti-Jewish riots in Egypt started as an anti-Zionist demonstration, but it ended with the killing of 5 Egyptian jews by a Muslim mob and over 300 other Jews were injured.
1945
Bess Myerson was the first Jewish-American and the first Miss New York (competing as Miss New York City, a competition organized by a local radio station) to win the Miss America Pageant as Miss America 1945. As the only Jewish contestant, Myerson was encouraged by the pageant directors to change her name to "Bess Meredith" or "Beth Merrick" but she refused. After winning the title (and as a Jewish Miss America), Myerson received few endorsements and later recalled that "I couldn't even stay in certain hotels [...] there would be signs that read no coloreds, no Jews, no dogs. I felt so rejected. Here I was chosen to represent American womanhood and then America treated me like this." She thus cut short her Miss America tour and instead traveled with the Anti-Defamation League. In this capacity, she spoke against discrimination in a talk entitled, "You Can't Be Beautiful and Hate."
1945
The Kraków pogrom was a post-WW2 pogrom, resulting in the death of Auschwitz survivor Róża Berger.
1946
The Kielce pogrom. 40 Jews were massacred and 80 other Jews were wounded out of about 200 who had returned home after World War II had ended. 2 non-Jewish Poles were also killed. Controversy was caused by August Hlond's reaction to the Kielce pogrom. While condemning murders, Hlond denied the racist nature of this crime. He saw the pogrom as a reaction against Jewish bureaucrats serving the Communist regime. This position was echoed by Cardinal Sapieha, who was reported to have said that the Jews brought it on themselves.
1946
Nikita Khrushchev, then the first secretary of the Communist party of Ukraine, closes many synagogues (the number declines from 450 to 60) and prevents Jewish refugees from returning to their homes.
1946
The post-WW2 Kunmadaras pogrom was the killing of 6 Jewish Holocaust survivors in Kunmadaras, Hungary.
1946
The Miskolc pogrom
1947
Anti-Jewish riots erupt in Aleppo, resulting in some 75 Jews murdered and several hundred wounded.
1947
A mob of Muslim sailors looted Jewish homes and shops in the Manama riots. In the end one Jewish woman was dead and a Synagogue was destroyed.
1947
A three-day riot broke out between the Jews of Aden and the local Muslim population. When it was over, 82 Jews were killed and 76 Jews were injured.
1947
In Austria, the Verbotsgesetz 1947 provided the legal framework for the process of denazification in Austria and the suppression of any potential revival of Nazism. In 1992, it was amended to prohibit the denial or gross minimisation of the Holocaust.

National Socialism Prohibition Law (1947, amendments of 1992)

§ 3g. He who operates in a manner characterized other than that in § § 3a – 3f will be punished (revitalising of the NSDAP or identification with), with imprisonment from one to up to ten years, and in cases of particularly dangerous suspects or activity, be punished with up to twenty years' imprisonment.

§ 3h. As an amendment to § 3 g., whoever denies, grossly plays down, approves or tries to excuse the National Socialist genocide or other National Socialist crimes against humanity in a print publication, in broadcast or other media.

1947
The Aden riots of 2–4 December 1947 targeted the Jewish community in the British Colony of Aden. At least 76 Jews were killed. Shortly after the riots, Aden's Jewish community almost entirely left, together with most of the Yemeni Jewish community.

1947
1947 Manama riots.
1948–2001
Antisemitism played a central role in the Jewish exodus from Arab lands. The Jewish population in the Arab Middle East and North Africa has decreased from 900,000 in 1948 to less than 8,000 in 2001.
1948
The Djereda was a pogrom against the tiny Jewish population of Jerada at the hands of the local Muslims. It ended with 43 Jews dead and around 150 Jews injured.
1948
The 1948 Anti-Jewish riots in Tripolitania was a riot between the Jewish and Arab populations of Tripoli. Unlike the previous Tripoli pogrom, the Jewish community of Tripoli fought back against the Muslim rioters. When it was over, 14 Jews and 4 Muslims were dead and many on both sides were injured.
1948
The 1948 Cairo bombings were several bombings which targeted the Jewish population of Cairo. The bombings claimed the lives of 70 Jews and 200 other Jews were wounded.
1948
The Southern Baptist Convention passed a resolution stating in part, "RESOLVED, That communism, fascism, political ecclesiasticism, and anti-Semitism are utterly contrary to the genius of our Baptist concept of freedom and spiritual values."
1948
Solomon Mikhoels, actor-director of the Moscow State Jewish Theater and chairman of the Jewish Anti-Fascist Committee is killed in a suspicious car accident (see MGB). Mass arrests of prominent Jewish intellectuals and suppression of Jewish culture follow under the banners of campaign on rootless cosmopolitanism and anti-Zionism.
1948
During the Siege of Jerusalem of the 1948 Arab–Israeli War, Arab armies were able to conquer the part of the West Bank and Jerusalem; they expelled all Jews (about 2,000) from the Old City (the Jewish Quarter) and destroyed the ancient synagogues that were in the Old City as well.
1949
The Menarsha synagogue attack was a grenade attack in the Jewish quarter of Damascus that took 12 lives.

== 1950s ==
1952
The Night of the Murdered Poets. The thirteen most prominent Soviet Yiddish writers, poets, actors and other intellectuals were executed, among them Peretz Markish, Leib Kwitko, David Hofstein, Itzik Feffer, David Bergelson. In 1955 UN General Assembly's session a high Soviet official still denied the "rumors" about their disappearance.
1952
The Prague Trials in Czechoslovakia.
1953
The Doctors' plot false accusation in the USSR. Scores of Soviet Jews dismissed from their jobs, arrested, some executed. The USSR was accused of pursuing a "new antisemitism." Stalinist opposition to "rootless cosmopolitans" – a euphemism for Jews – was rooted in the belief, as expressed by Klement Gottwald, that "treason and espionage infiltrate the ranks of the Communist Party. This channel is Zionism." This newer antisemitism was, in effect, a species of anti-Zionism.
1953
Holocaust Remembrance Day in Israel is inaugurated.
1956
The Alaska Mental Health Enabling Act of 1956 (Public Law 84-830) was an Act of Congress passed to improve mental health care in the United States territory of Alaska. It became the focus of a major political controversy after opponents nicknamed it the "Siberia Bill" and denounced it as being part of a communist plot to hospitalize and brainwash Americans. Campaigners asserted that it was part of an international Jewish, Roman Catholic or psychiatric conspiracy intended to establish United Nations-run concentration camps in the United States.
1956
Antisemitism swept across Poland as part of a purge of Stalinists.
1958
On 28 April 1958, Birmingham, Alabama, 54 sticks of dynamite were placed outside Temple Beth-El in a bombing attempt. According to police reports, the burning fuses were doused by heavy rainfall, preventing the dynamite from exploding. Although the crime was never solved, police considered Bobby Frank Cherry, later convicted of bombing the Sixteenth Street Baptist Church, to be a suspect.
1958
The Hebrew Benevolent Congregation Temple bombing occurred on 12 October 1958. The Temple, on Peachtree Street in Atlanta, Georgia, housed a Reform Jewish congregation. The building was damaged extensively by the dynamite-fueled explosion, although no one was injured. Five suspects were arrested almost immediately after the bombing. One of them, George Bright, was tried twice. His first trial ended with a hung jury and his second with an acquittal. As a result of Bright's acquittal the other suspects were not tried, and no one was ever convicted of the bombing.
1959
Impeachment of Man is a book by Savitri Devi, first published in 1959, in which she recounts a history of the general indifference toward the suffering of non-human life. She puts forth a pro-vegetarian, anti-vivisectionist, biocentric, and misanthropic conservationist point of view. However, she does so within the context of her pro-Hitler and pro-Nazi political views, and devotes space to antisemitism and denouncing Jewish dietary practices.
1959
On 21 March 1959, Pope John XXIII ordered that the word "faithless" (Latin: perfidis) be removed from the prayer for the conversion of the Jews, actually interrupting the Service and asking the prayer to be repeated without that word. This word had caused much trouble in recent times because of misconceptions that the Latin perfidis was equivalent to "perfidious", giving birth to the view that the prayer accused the Jews of treachery (perfidy), though the word is more correctly translated as "faithless" or "unbelieving". Accordingly, the prayer was revised to read:
Let us pray also for the Jews: that almighty God may remove the veil from their hearts; so that they too may acknowledge Jesus Christ our Lord. Let us pray. Let us kneel. Arise. Almighty and eternal God, who dost also not exclude from thy mercy the Jews: hear our prayers, which we offer for the blindness of that people; that acknowledging the light of thy Truth, which is Christ, they may be delivered from their darkness. Through the same our Lord Jesus Christ, who liveth and reigneth with thee in the unity of the Holy Spirit, God, for ever and ever. Amen. On Good Friday of 1963, by mistake the old text of the prayer was given to the deacon, who read "perfidis". Pope John XXIII interrupted the liturgy again, and ordered that the prayer be repeated with the word omitted.

== 1960s ==
1960s
Chess player Bobby Fischer made numerous anti-Jewish statements and professed a general hatred for Jews since at least the early 1960s. Although Fischer described his mother as Jewish in a 1962 interview, he later denied his Jewish ancestry.
1960
The Badges Act 1960 (Abzeichengesetz 1960) prohibits the public display of Nazi symbols in Austria, and violations are punishable by up to €4000.- fine and up to 1 month imprisonment.
1960
On 25 March, 1960, the synagogue Congregation Beth Israel and its members were subject to an antisemitic attack. About 180 members were attending a Friday evening service to dedicate the new Zemurray Social Hall, and led by then-rabbi Saul Rubin and Rev. John Speaks and Dr. Franklin Denson of First Methodist Church, when windows were smashed and the synagogue fire-bombed. Two members—Alvin Lowi and Alan Cohn—who rushed out to see what was happening were met by Jerry Hunt, a 16-year-old Nazi sympathizer, who wounded them both with a shotgun, then fled. Lowi was just shot in the hand, but one of Cohn's aortas was nicked, and he almost died, requiring 22 US pints (10 L) of blood. Earlier that week Hunt had attended a rally for antisemitic and white supremacist politician John G. Crommelin, and had had a fight with a Jewish boy over a chess game at the Gadsden Community Centre.
1961
In 1961, a protégé of Harry Elmer Barnes, David Hoggan published Der Erzwungene Krieg (The Forced War) in West Germany, which claimed that Germany had been the victim of an Anglo-Polish conspiracy in 1939. Though Der Erzwungene Krieg was primarily concerned with the origins of World War II, it also down-played or justified the effects of Nazi antisemitic measures in the pre-1939 period. For example, Hoggan justified the huge one billion Reich-mark fine imposed on the entire Jewish community in Germany after the 1938 Kristallnacht as a reasonable measure to prevent what he called "Jewish profiteering" at the expense of German insurance companies and alleged that no Jews were killed in the Kristallnacht (in fact, 91 German Jews were killed in the Kristallnacht).
1962
In his 1962 pamphlet, Revisionism and Brainwashing, Harry Elmer Barnes claimed that there was a "lack of any serious opposition or concerted challenge to the atrocity stories and other modes of defamation of German national character and conduct". Barnes argued that there was "a failure to point out the atrocities of the Allies were more brutal, painful, mortal and numerous than the most extreme allegations made against the Germans". He claimed that in order to justify the "horrors and evils of the Second World War", the Allies made the Nazis the "scapegoat" for their own misdeeds.
1963
"Judaism Without Embellishments" published by the Academy of Sciences of the Ukrainian SSR in 1963.
1964
In a 1964 article, "Zionist Fraud", published in the American Mercury, Harry Elmer Barnes wrote: "The courageous author [Rassinier] lays the chief blame for misrepresentation on those whom we must call the swindlers of the crematoria, the Israeli politicians who derive billions of marks from nonexistent, mythical and imaginary cadavers, whose numbers have been reckoned in an unusually distorted and dishonest manner." Using Rassinier as his source, Barnes claimed that Germany was the victim of aggression in both 1914 and 1939, and that reports of the Holocaust were propaganda to justify a war of aggression against Germany.
1964
Nasser told a German newspaper in 1964 that "no person, not even the most simple one, takes seriously the lie of the six million Jews that were murdered [in the Holocaust]."
1964
The Roman Catholic Church under Pope Paul VI issues the document Nostra aetate as part of Vatican II, repudiating the doctrine of Jewish guilt for the Crucifixion.
1964
In 1964, French historian Paul Rassinier published The Drama of the European Jews. Rassinier was himself a concentration camp survivor (he was held in Buchenwald for having helped French Jews escape the Nazis), and modern-day holocaust deniers continue to cite his works as scholarly research that questions the accepted facts of the Holocaust. Critics argued that Rassinier did not cite evidence for his claims and ignored information that contradicted his assertions; he nevertheless remains influential in Holocaust denial circles for being one of the first deniers to propose that a vast Zionist/Allied/Soviet conspiracy faked the Holocaust, a theme that would be picked up in later years by other authors.
1964
The Civil Rights Act of 1964 (Pub. L. 88–352, 78 Stat. 241, enacted July 2, 1964) is a landmark piece of civil rights legislation in the United States that outlawed discrimination based on religion, race, color, sex, or national origin.
1965
The Frankfurt Auschwitz trials, known in German as der Auschwitz-Prozess, or der zweite Auschwitz-Prozess, (the "second Auschwitz trial") was a series of trials running from 20 December 1963 to 19 August 1965, charging 22 defendants under German criminal law for their roles in the Holocaust as mid- to lower-level officials in the Auschwitz-Birkenau death and concentration camp complex. Hans Hofmeyer led as Chief Judge the "criminal case against Mulka and others" (reference number 4 Ks 2/63).
Overall, only 789 individuals of the approximately 6,500 surviving SS personnel who served at Auschwitz and its sub-camps were ever tried, of which 750 received sentences. Unlike the first trial in Poland held almost two decades earlier, the trials in Frankfurt were not based on the legal definition of crimes against humanity as recognized by international law, but according to the state laws of the Federal Republic.
1967
Allen Ginsberg stated that, in a private conversation in 1967, Ezra Pound told the young poet, "my poems don't make sense." He went on to supposedly call himself a "moron", to characterize his writing as "stupid and ignorant", "a mess". Ginsberg reassured Pound that he "had shown us the way", but Pound refused to be mollified:

'Any good I've done has been spoiled by bad intentions – the preoccupation with irrelevant and stupid things,' [he] replied. Then very slowly, with emphasis, surely conscious of Ginsberg's being Jewish: 'But the worst mistake I made was that stupid, suburban prejudice of anti-semitism.'

1967
In 1967, Congregation Beth Israel moved to its current location, a building on Old Canton Road described by Jack Nelson as "an octagonal structure dominated by a massive roof". On 18 September 1967 the new building was wrecked by a dynamite bomb placed by Klan members in a recessed doorway. According to Nelson, the explosion had "ripped through administrative offices and a conference room, torn a hole in the ceiling, blown out windows, ruptured a water pipe and buckled a wall." The perpetrators were not discovered. In November of that year the same group planted a bomb that blew out the front of the house of Dr. Perry Nussbaum (Beth Israel's rabbi from 1954 to 1973), while he and his wife were sleeping there.
1967
All Jewish men in Egypt were placed in camps in 1967 during the Six-Day War, and they were kept there for more than two years; Karaite Jews were the last to leave.
1968–1971
State-supported antisemitism swept across Poland in 1968, not subsiding until 1971, by which time half of Poland's Jews had fled Poland.
1968
During the American Civil Rights Movement in the 1960s, the leadership of Beth Israel spoke out against the Ku Klux Klan's attacks on black churches. In response, Thomas Tarrants of Mobile, Alabama, who had helped bomb the synagogue building of a different synagogue, Beth Israel Congregation, and its rabbi's house there (see previous entry in this timeline) bombed Beth Israel's education building on 28 May 1968. The force of the blast knocked down several walls of the education building and caved in part of the roof while also destroying a door at the opposite end of the synagogue building. A hole approximately 24 inches (61 cm) in diameter was left in the concrete floor, and damages were estimated to be around $50,000 (equivalent to $463,000 today). According to Sammy Feltenstein, past president of Congregation Beth Israel, pieces of stained glass that survived the bombing were salvaged and adorn the front window of the synagogue today. Later that year, on 30 June, Tarrants returned to Meridian to bomb the home of Meyer Davidson, an outspoken leader of the Jewish community, on 29th Avenue. But the FBI and police chief Roy Gunn convinced Raymond and Alton Wayne Roberts, local Klan members, to gather information about the Klan's operations, and leaders of the Jewish communities in Jackson and in Meridian had raised money to pay the two informants, who tipped off the FBI about the attack before it happened.
1969
David Hoggan explicitly denied the Holocaust in 1969 in a book entitled The Myth of the Six Million, which was published by the Noontide Press, a small Los Angeles publisher specializing in antisemitic literature.
1960s–1991
The rise of Zionology in the Soviet Union. In 1983, the Department of Propaganda and the KGB's Anti-Zionist committee of the Soviet public orchestrates formally "anti-Zionist" campaign.
1968
Polish 1968 political crisis. The state-organized antisemitic campaign in the People's Republic of Poland under guise of "anti-Zionism" drives out most of remaining Jewish population.
1968
The ancient Jewish community of Hebron, which had been destroyed in the 1929 Hebron massacre, is revived at Kiryat Arba. The community, in 1979 and afterwards, moves into Hebron proper and rebuilds the demolished Abraham Avinu Synagogue, the site of which had been used by Jordan as a cattle-pen.
1968
The Alhambra Decree was formally revoked on 16 December 1968.
1968
The Fair Housing Act (Title VIII of the Civil Rights Act of 1968) in the United States introduced meaningful federal enforcement mechanisms. It outlawed:

- Refusal to sell or rent a dwelling to any person because of race, color, religion, sex, or national origin.
- Discrimination based on race, color, religion or national origin in the terms, conditions or privilege of the sale or rental of a dwelling.
- Advertising the sale or rental of a dwelling indicating preference of discrimination based on race, color, religion or national origin.
- Coercing, threatening, intimidating, or interfering with a person's enjoyment or exercise of housing rights based on discriminatory reasons or retaliating against a person or organization that aids or encourages the exercise or enjoyment of fair housing rights.

1969 November 9
Tupamaros West-Berlin attempted to bomb of West Berlin's Jewish Community Centre. The bomb, supplied by the undercover government agent Peter Urbach, failed to explode.

== 1970s ==
1970s
Lyndon LaRouche and his ideas have been called antisemitic since at least the mid-1970s by dozens of individuals and organizations in countries across Europe and North America. LaRouche and his followers have responded to these allegations by claiming that LaRouche has Jewish supporters and by denying the accusations.
1970
Canada has no legislation specifically restricting the ownership, display, purchase, import or export of Nazi flags. However, sections 318–320 of the Criminal Code, adopted by Canada's parliament in 1970 and based in large part on the 1965 Cohen Committee recommendations, provide law enforcement agencies with broad scope to intervene if such flags are used to communicate hatred in a public place (particularly sections 319(1), 319(2), and 319(7).
1970
After the Second Vatican Council, the Good Friday prayer for the Jews was completely revised for the 1970 edition of the Roman Missal. Because of the possibility of a misinterpretation similar to that of the word "perfidis" (see above in 1959), the reference to the veil on the hearts of the Jews, which was based on 2 Corinthians 3:14, was removed. The 1973 ICEL English translation of the revised prayer is as follows:
Let us pray for the Jewish people, the first to hear the word of God, that they may continue to grow in the love of his name and in faithfulness to his covenant. (Prayer in silence. Then the priest says:) Almighty and eternal God, long ago you gave your promise to Abraham and his posterity. Listen to your Church as we pray that the people you first made your own may arrive at the fullness of redemption. We ask this through Christ our Lord. Amen.
1971
The ban on Jewish immigration to Israel from the Soviet Union was lifted in 1971 leading to the 1970s Soviet Union aliyah.
1971
The Southern Baptist Convention passed a resolution stating in part, "we point out particularly one area of concern known as anti-Semitism, which some think erroneously is inherent in Christianity, and which we disavow."
1971
To further the goal of reconciliation, the Catholic Church established an internal International Catholic-Jewish Liaison Committee and the International Jewish Committee for Interreligious Consultations. (This Committee is not a part of the Church's Magisterium.)
1972
The Southern Baptist Convention passed a "Resolution on Anti-Semitism" stating in part:
"Therefore, be it RESOLVED, That this Convention go on record as opposed to any and all forms of anti-Semitism; that it declare anti-Semitism unchristian; that we messengers to this Convention pledge ourselves to combat anti-Semitism in every honorable, Christian way."
"Be it further RESOLVED, That Southern Baptists covenant to work positively to replace all anti-Semitic bias with the Christian attitude and practice of love for Jews, who along with all other men, are equally beloved of God."
1972
11 Israeli Olympic athletes are taken hostage and eventually tortured and killed in the Munich massacre.
1974
Four Jewish girls were raped, murdered and mutilated after attempting to flee to Israel. Their bodies were discovered by border police in a cave in the Zabdani Mountains northwest of Damascus along with the remains of two Jewish boys, Natan Shaya 18 and Kassem Abadi 20, victims of an earlier massacre. Syrian authorities deposited the bodies of all six in sacks before the homes of their parents in the Jewish ghetto in Damascus.
1974
Did Six Million Really Die? The Truth at Last is a Holocaust denial pamphlet allegedly written by British National Front member Richard Verrall under the pseudonym Richard E. Harwood and published by Ernst Zündel in 1974.
1975
The United Nations passed a resolution determining that "Zionism is a form of racism and racial discrimination." (It was revoked in 1991, as mentioned below.)
1976
Arthur Butz's The Hoax of the Twentieth Century: The case against the presumed extermination of European Jewry was published.
1977
David Irving's Holocaust denying book Hitler's War was published.
1977 March 9–11
1977 Washington, D.C. attack and hostage taking.
1977 October 3
In suburban St. Louis, Missouri, Joseph Paul Franklin hid in the bushes near a Shaare Zedek Synagogue (University City, Missouri) and fired on a group attending services. In this incident, Franklin killed forty-two-year-old Gerald Gordon and wounded Steven Goldman and William Ash.
1977
In a 1977 Globe-Democrat column discussing John Toland's biography of Adolf Hitler, Pat Buchanan wrote:

Though Hitler was indeed racist and anti-Semitic to the core, a man who without compunction could commit murder and genocide, he was also an individual of great courage, a soldier's soldier in the Great War, a political organizer of the first rank, a leader steeped in the history of Europe, who possessed oratorical powers that could awe even those who despised him... Hitler's success was not based on his extraordinary gifts alone. His genius was an intuitive sense of the mushiness, the character flaws, the weakness masquerading as morality that was in the hearts of the statesmen who stood in his path.

Buchanan supporters say the paragraph is taken out of context. They point out that in the same review Buchanan praised Winston Churchill for seeing that "Hitler was marching along the road toward a New Order where Western civilization would not survive" and concluded that modern-day statesmen were not following that example.
1977
National Socialist Party of America v. Village of Skokie, 432 U.S. 43 (1977) (also known as Smith v. Collin; sometimes referred to as the Skokie Affair), was a United States Supreme Court case dealing with freedom of assembly. The outcome was that the Illinois Supreme Court ruled that the use of the swastika is a symbolic form of free speech entitled to First Amendment protections and determined that the swastika itself did not constitute "fighting words." Its ruling allowed the National Socialist Party of America to march.
1978
In 1978 Willis Carto founded the Institute for Historical Review (IHR), an organization dedicated to publicly challenging the commonly accepted history of the Holocaust.
1978/1979
In December 1978 and January 1979, Robert Faurisson, a French professor of literature at the University of Lyon, wrote two letters to Le Monde claiming that the gas chambers used by the Nazis to exterminate the Jews did not exist.
1979
A House Joint resolution 1014 designated 28 and 29 April 1979 as "The Days of Remembrance of the Victims of the Holocaust (DRVH)." After that the Days of Remembrance of the Victims of the Holocaust (DRVH) has been an annual 8-day period designated by the United States Congress for civic commemorations and special educational programs that help citizens remember and draw lessons from the Holocaust.
1979
When the Anti-Defamation League accused Lyndon LaRouche of antisemitism in 1979, he filed a $26-million libel suit; however, the case failed when Justice Michael Dontzin of the New York Supreme Court ruled that it was fair comment, and that the facts "reasonably give rise" to that description.
1979
"Jewish Princess" is a song by Frank Zappa released on his album Sheik Yerbouti in 1979. The song is a humorous look at the Jewish-American princess stereotype which attracted attention from the Anti-Defamation League, to which Zappa denied an apology, arguing: "Unlike the unicorn, such creatures do exist – and deserve to be 'commemorated' with their own special opus". In an interview with Spin magazine he was almost offended saying, "...as if to say there is no such thing as a Jewish Princess. Like I invented this?" Biographer Barry Miles claimed in his book, Frank Zappa (Atlantic Books of London, 2005), that the ADL asked the Federal Communications Commission (FCC) to ban the record from being played on the air – a symbolic effort given that the song was not being played anyway.

== 1980s ==
1980, 27 July
1980 Antwerp attack.
1980, 3 October
1980 Paris synagogue bombing.
1980
In 1980, the Institute for Historical Review promised a $50,000 reward to anyone who could prove that Jews were gassed at Auschwitz. Mel Mermelstein wrote a letter to the editors of the LA Times and others including The Jerusalem Post. The IHR wrote back, offering him $50,000 for proof that Jews were, in fact, gassed in the gas chambers at Auschwitz. Mermelstein, in turn, submitted a notarized account of his internment at Auschwitz and how he witnessed Nazi guards ushering his mother and two sisters and others towards (as he learned later) gas chamber number five. Despite this, the IHR refused to pay the reward. Represented by public interest attorney William John Cox, Mermelstein subsequently sued the IHR in the Superior Court of Los Angeles Countyℳ for breach of contract, anticipatory repudiation, libel, injurious denial of established fact, intentional infliction of emotional distress, and declaratory relief (see case no. C 356 542). On 9 October 1981, both parties in the Mermelstein case filed motions for summary judgment in consideration of which Judge Thomas T. Johnson of the Superior Court of Los Angeles County took "judicial notice of the fact that Jews were gassed to death at the Auschwitz Concentration Camp in Poland during the summer of 1944," judicial notice meaning that the court treated the gas chambers as common knowledge, and therefore did not require evidence that the gas chambers existed. On 5 August 1985, Judge Robert A. Wenke entered a judgment based upon the Stipulation for Entry of Judgment agreed upon by the parties on 22 July 1985. The judgment required IHR and other defendants to pay $90,000 to Mermelstein and to issue a letter of apology to "Mr. Mel Mermelstein, a survivor of Auschwitz-Birkenau and Buchenwald, and all other survivors of Auschwitz" for "pain, anguish and suffering" caused to them.
Early 1980s
Jesse Jackson was criticized in the early 1980s for remarks made to a reporter where he referred to New York City as "Hymietown". (Hymie is a pejorative term for Jews.) Jackson ultimately acknowledged he had used the term, and said he had been wrong; however, he also said that he had considered the conversation with the reporter to be off-the-record at the time he made the remarks. Jackson apologized during a speech before national Jewish leaders in a Manchester, New Hampshire synagogue, but an enduring split between Jackson and many in the Jewish community continued at least through the 1990s.
1981 August 29
1981 Vienna synagogue attack.
1981 October 20
1981 Antwerp synagogue bombing.
1981
The Southern Baptist Convention passed a "Resolution On Anti-Semitism" stating in part, "Be it therefore RESOLVED, That the messengers at the 1981 Southern Baptist Convention meeting in Los Angeles, June 9–11, 1981, commend our Southern Baptist Convention leaders as they seek sincere friendship and meaningful dialogue with our Jewish neighbors."
1981
Elana Steinberg was killed by her husband Steven Steinberg, who claimed that she was a "spoiled, over-indulged brat – the stereotypical Jewish American Princess," and that she made him insane by spending and insisting that he become more successful; he was found not guilty.
1981-3
From 1981 to 1982, Holocaust denier Ernst Zündel had his mailing privileges suspended by the Canadian government on the grounds that he had been using the mail to send hate propaganda, a criminal offence in Canada. Zündel then began shipping from a post office box in Niagara Falls, New York, until the ban on his mailing in Canada was lifted in January 1983.
1982
A bomb placed by neo-Nazis exploded outside the Jewish hunter of Nazis Simon Wiesenthal's house in Vienna on 11 June 1982, after which police guards were stationed outside his home 24 hours a day.
1982 October 9
Great Synagogue of Rome attack takes place.
1982
The thesis of the 1982 doctoral dissertation of Mahmoud Abbas, a co-founder of Fatah and president of the Palestinian National Authority, was "The Secret Connection between the Nazis and the Leaders of the Zionist Movement". In his 1983 book The Other Side: the Secret Relationship Between Nazism and Zionism based on the dissertation, Abbas denied that six million Jews had been murdered in the Holocaust; dismissing it as a "myth" and a "fantastic lie". At most, he wrote, 890,000 Jews were killed by the Germans. Abbas claimed that the number of deaths has been exaggerated for political purposes. "It seems that the interest of the Zionist movement, however, is to inflate this figure [of Holocaust deaths] so that their gains will be greater. This led them to emphasize this figure [six million] in order to gain the solidarity of international public opinion with Zionism. Many scholars have debated the figure of six million and reached stunning conclusions—fixing the number of Jewish victims at only a few hundred thousand." In his March 2006 interview with Haaretz, Abbas stated, "I wrote in detail about the Holocaust and said I did not want to discuss numbers. I quoted an argument between historians in which various numbers of casualties were mentioned. One wrote there were 12 million victims and another wrote there were 800,000. I have no desire to argue with the figures. The Holocaust was a terrible, unforgivable crime against the Jewish nation, a crime against humanity that cannot be accepted by humankind. The Holocaust was a terrible thing and nobody can claim I denied it." While acknowledging the existence of the Holocaust in 2006 and 2014, Abbas has defended the position that Zionists collaborated with the Nazis to perpetrate it. In 2012, Abbas told Al Mayadeen, a Beirut TV station affiliated with Iran and Hezbollah, that he "challenges anyone who can deny that the Zionist movement had ties with the Nazis before World War II".
1982 September 18
Great Synagogue of Europe attacked by a man with a submachine gun, seriously wounding four people. The attack has been attributed to the Abu Nidal Organization.
1982
In the book Against Sadomasochism, Susan Leigh Star criticizes the use of swastikas and other Nazi imagery by some BDSM practitioners as antisemitic and racist.
1983
The Lutheran Church–Missouri Synod officially disassociates itself from "intemperate remarks about Jews" in Luther's works. Since then, many Lutheran church bodies and organizations have issued similar statements. (See Martin Luther and the Jews)
1984
On the evening of 18 June 1984, Alan Berg was fatally shot in the driveway of his Denver home by members of the white nationalist group The Order. His provocative talk show sought to flush out "the anti-Semitism latent in the area's conservative population". He succeeded in provoking members of The Order to engage him in conversations on this talk show and his "often-abrasive on-air persona" ignited the anger of The Order. Subsequently, members of The Order involved in the killing were identified as being part of a group planning to kill prominent Jews. Ultimately, two members of The Order, David Lane and Bruce Pierce, were convicted for their involvement in the case, though neither of homicide.
1984
In 1984, James Keegstra, a Canadian high-school teacher, was charged under the Canadian Criminal Code for "promoting hatred against an identifiable group by communicating anti-Semitic statements to his students". During class, he would describe Jews as a people of profound evil who had "created the Holocaust to gain sympathy." He also tested his students in exams on his theories and opinion of Jews.
Keegstra was charged under s 281.2(2) of the Criminal Code (now s 319(2), which provides that "Every one who, by communicating statements, other than in private conversation, wilfully promotes hatred against any identifiable group" commits a criminal offence. He was convicted at trial before the Alberta Court of Queen's Bench. The court rejected the argument, advanced by Keegstra and his lawyer, Doug Christie, that promoting hatred is a constitutionally protected freedom of expression as per s 2(b) of the Canadian Charter of Rights and Freedoms. Keegstra appealed to the Alberta Court of Appeal. That court agreed with Keegstra, and he was acquitted. The Crown then appealed the case to the Supreme Court of Canada, which rule by a 4–3 majority that promoting hatred could be justifiably restricted under s 1 of the Charter. The Supreme Court restored Keegstra's conviction. He was fired from his teaching position shortly afterwards.
1985, 22 July
1985 Copenhagen bombings.
1985
At a meeting of the Nation of Islam at Madison Square Garden in 1985, Louis Farrakhan said of the Jews: "And don't you forget, when it's God who puts you in the ovens, it's forever!"
1985
On 24 December 1985, David Lewis Rice, a follower of the right-wing extremist group the Duck Club, gained entry to the Seattle home of civil litigation attorney Charles Goldmark using a toy gun and pretending to be a deliveryman. He tied the family up, chloroformed them into unconsciousness, beat them with a steam iron, and stabbed them. Rice mistakenly believed the family to be Jewish and Communist. In 1998, he pleaded guilty to the crimes in exchange for avoiding the death penalty. The Goldmark Murders remain one of the most notorious antisemitic hate crimes as well as politically motivated killings in recent memory in the United States, even though the victims were not actually Jewish and Communist as the killer mistakenly believed.
1985
Ronald Reagan visited a German military cemetery in Bitburg to lay a wreath with West German Chancellor Helmut Kohl. It was determined that the cemetery held the graves of forty-nine members of the Waffen-SS. Reagan issued a statement that called the Nazi soldiers buried in that cemetery as themselves "victims," a designation which ignited a stir over whether Reagan had equated the SS men to victims of the Holocaust; Pat Buchanan, Reagan's Director of Communications, argued that the president did not equate the SS members with the actual Holocaust. Now strongly urged to cancel the visit, the president responded that it would be wrong to back down on a promise he had made to Chancellor Kohl. He ultimately attended the ceremony where two military generals laid a wreath.
1986
Leo Frank was posthumously pardoned by the Georgia State Board of Pardons and Paroles.
1986
In Israel, a law to criminalize Holocaust denial was passed by the Knesset on 8 July 1986.
1986 September 6
Gunmen opened fire during a Shabbat service in Neve Shalom Synagogue in Istanbul, Turkey which resulted in the death of 22 people. This attack is attributed to the Palestinian militant Abu Nidal.
1987
On 13 September 1987 Jean-Marie Le Pen said, "I ask myself several questions. I'm not saying the gas chambers didn't exist. I haven't seen them myself. I haven't particularly studied the question. But I believe it's just a detail in the history of World War II." He was condemned under the Gayssot Act and ordered to pay 1.2 million francs (183,200 euros).
1987
Pat Buchanan called for ending prosecution of Nazi camp guards, saying it was "running down 70-year-old camp guards."
1987
In 1987, Bradley R. Smith, a former media director of the Institute for Historical Review, founded the Committee for Open Debate on the Holocaust (CODOH).
1987
John Koehler was the communications director for five working days under President Ronald Reagan; Koehler, who was an immigrant from Germany, had been in Hitler Youth.
Since 1987
Activities of Pamyat and other "nonformal" ultra-nationalist organizations in the Soviet Union.
1988
In 1988, the American historian Arno J. Mayer published a book entitled Why Did the Heavens Not Darken?, which did not explicitly deny the Holocaust, but lent support to Holocaust denial by stating that most people who died at Auschwitz were the victims of "natural causes" such as disease, not gassing. Mayer also cited the works of Holocaust deniers Arthur Butz and Paul Rassinier in his book's bibliography. Critics such as Lucy Dawidowicz criticized Mayer's citation of deniers, and argued that his statements about Auschwitz were factually incorrect. Holocaust expert Robert Jan van Pelt has noted that Mayer's book is as close as a mainstream historian has ever come to supporting Holocaust denial. Holocaust deniers such as David Irving have often cited Mayer's book as one reason for embracing Holocaust denial. Though Mayer has been often condemned for his statement about the reasons for the Auschwitz death toll, his book does not deny the use of gas chambers at Auschwitz, as Holocaust deniers often claim.
Some mainstream Holocaust historians have labeled Mayer a denier. The Israeli historian Yehuda Bauer wrote that Mayer "popularizes the nonsense that the Nazis saw in Marxism and Bolshevism their main enemy, and the Jews unfortunately got caught up in this; when he links the destruction of the Jews to the ups and downs of German warfare in the Soviet Union, in a book that is so cocksure of itself that it does not need a proper scientific apparatus, he is really engaging in a much more subtle form of Holocaust denial".
Defenders of Mayer argue that his statement that "Sources for the study of the gas chambers at once rare and unreliable" has been taken out of context, particularly by Holocaust deniers. Michael Shermer and Alex Grobman observe that the paragraph from which the statement is taken asserts that the SS destroyed the majority of the documentation relating to the operation of the gas chambers in the death camps, which is why Mayer feels that sources for the operation of the gas chambers are "rare" and "unreliable".
1988
In February 1988, an improperly drawn swastika and antisemitic slogans and "Jesus Lives; You Can't Kill Him" and "Accept Hitler, Respect Christ" were plastered across the synagogue Bet Shira Congregation, and 30 windows were smashed. In response, a neighboring church put a Star of David on its lawn, and its parish donated $1,000 towards repairing the windows. Miami Sunset High School students painted over the anti-Semitic slurs spray-painted by the vandals. Four teenagers, three of whom were football players at Miami Palmetto High School, were sentenced for having vandalized the synagogue to 200 hours of community service and ordered to pay the $14,800 ($40,300 today) in damages.
1989
Finland has no specific legislation aimed at controlling ownership, display, purchase, import or export of Nazi flags, however the Criminal Code (39/1889) (especially Chapter 11 'War crimes and offences against humanity' Section 8) may be applied where an offence has been directed at a person belonging to a national, racial, ethnic or other population group due to his/her membership in such a group.

== 1990s ==
1990s
Ruth Bader Ginsburg objected to the United States Supreme Court bar inscribing its certificates "in the year of our Lord", at the request of some Orthodox Jews who opposed it, and due to her objection, Supreme Court bar members have since been given other choices of how to inscribe the year on their certificates.
1990
Lake Forest, Illinois kept anti-Jewish and anti-African-American housing covenants until 1990.
1990
On five occasions in six weeks vandals used slingshots to shoot out windows at the synagogue Bet Shira Congregation. Three teenagers, two of them students at Palmetto High School, were arrested for shooting out the windows.
1990
For his portrayal of Jewish nightclub owners Moe and Josh Flatbush in the 1990 film Mo' Better Blues, Spike Lee drew the ire of the Anti Defamation League, B'nai B'rith, and other such Jewish organizations. The Anti-Defamation League claimed that the characterizations of the nightclub owners "dredge up an age-old and highly dangerous form of anti-Semitic stereotyping", and stated it was "...disappointed that Spike Lee – whose success is largely due to his efforts to break down racial stereotypes and prejudice – has employed the same kind of tactics that he supposedly deplores." Lee eventually responded in an editorial in The New York Times, alleging "a double standard at work in the accusations of anti-Semitism" given the long history of negative portrayals of African-Americans in film: "Not every black person is a pimp, murderer, prostitute, convict, rapist or drug addict, but that hasn't stopped Hollywood from writing these roles for African-Americans". Lee argues that even if the Flatbush brothers are stereotyped figures, their "10 minutes of screen time" is insignificant when compared to "100 years of Hollywood cinema... [and] a slew of really racist, anti-Semitic filmmakers". According to Lee, his status as a successful African-American artist has led to hostility and unfair treatment: "Don't hold me to a higher moral standard than the rest of my filmmaking colleagues... Now that young black filmmakers have arisen in the film industry, all of a sudden stereotypes are a big issue... I think it's reaching the point where I'm getting reviewed, not my films." Ultimately, however, Lee refused to apologize for his portrayal of the Flatbush brothers: "I stand behind all my work, including my characters, Moe and Josh Flatbush... if critics are telling me that to avoid charges of anti-Semitism, all Jewish characters I write have to be model citizens, and not one can be a villain, cheat or a crook, and that no Jewish people have ever exploited black artists in the history of the entertainment industry, that's unrealistic and unfair."
1990
In France, the Gayssot Act, voted for on 13 July 1990, makes it illegal to question the existence of crimes that fall in the category of crimes against humanity as defined in the London Charter of 1945, on the basis of which Nazi leaders were convicted by the International Military Tribunal at Nuremberg in 1945–46. When the act was challenged by Robert Faurisson, the Human Rights Committee upheld it as a necessary means to counter possible antisemitism.
1990
In a 1990 column defending John Demjanjuk, Pat Buchanan said:

Diesel engines do not emit enough carbon monoxide to kill anybody. In 1988, 97 kids, trapped 400 feet (120 m) underground in a Washington, DC, tunnel while two locomotives spewed diesel exhaust into the car, emerged unharmed after 45 minutes. Demjanjuk's weapon of mass murder cannot kill.

When asked for his source, Buchanan said, "somebody sent it to me." Critic Jamie McCarthy says this claim may have come from the German American Information and Education Association's newsletter, a publication he accused of antisemitism and Holocaust denial. He also argues that:

Unlike the locomotive engineer in Buchanan's example, who was concerned with saving the lives of trapped people, the Nazis had no qualms about opening the engine's throttle and restricting the air intake.

The Washington Post had reported in 1989, before the controversy, that:

An Amtrak train had been stalled in a tunnel for half an hour, and smoke from the diesel engine had filled the first car, where there were 97 fifth-grade pupils and 27 adult chaperones. [EMT Cynthia] Brown boarded the train, guided the passengers – most of whom suffered from smoke inhalation – from the car and assisted those who needed immediate attention.

1990
French literature professor Robert Faurisson was convicted and punished for Holocaust denial under the Gayssot Act in 1990.
1991
The Secret Relationship Between Blacks and Jews, published in 1991, is a book that asserts that Jews dominated the Atlantic slave trade. The book has been labeled an Antisemitic canard by historians including Saul S. Friedman, who writes that Jews had a minimal role in New World slave trade. Henry Louis Gates, Jr., head of the department of Afro-American studies at Harvard University, called the book "the Bible of new anti-Semitism" and added that "the book massively misinterprets the historical record, largely through a process of cunningly selective quotations of often reputable sources".
The book was criticized for being antisemitic, and for failing to provide an objective analysis of the role of Jews in the slave trade. Common criticisms were that the book used selective quotes, made "crude use of statistics," and was purposefully trying to exaggerate the role of Jews.
Historian Ralph A. Austen criticized the book, saying that the "distortions are produced almost entirely by selective citation rather than explicit falsehood.... more frequently there are innuendos imbedded in the accounts of Jewish involvement in the slave trade," and "[w]hile we should not ignore the anti-Semitism of The Secret Relationship..., we must recognize the legitimacy of the stated aim of examining fully and directly even the most uncomfortable elements in our [Black and Jewish] common past." Austen acknowledges that the book was the first book on the subject aimed at a non-scholarly audience.
In 1995, the American Historical Association (AHA) issued a statement condemning "any statement alleging that Jews played a disproportionate role in the Atlantic slave trade."
The publication of The Secret Relationship spurred retorts published specifically to refute the thesis of The Secret Relationship:

- 1992 – Harold Brackman, Jew on the Brain: A Public Refutation of the Nation of Islam's The Secret Relationship Between Blacks and Jews.
- 1992 – David Brion Davis, "Jews in the Slave Trade," in Culturefront (Fall 1992) pp 42–45.
- 1993 – Seymour Drescher, "The Role of Jews in the Atlantic Slave Trade," Immigrants and Minorities, 12 (1993), pp 113–125.
- 1993 – Marc Caplan, Jew-Hatred As History: An Analysis of the Nation of Islam's "The Secret Relationship" (Published by the Anti Defamation League).
- 1998 – Eli Faber, Jews, Slaves, and the Slave Trade: Setting the Record Straight, New York University Press.
- 1999 – Saul S. Friedman, Jews and the American Slave Trade, Transaction.

A post-1991 scholar who analyzed the role of Jews in the overall Atlantic slave trade concluded that it was "minimal," and only identified certain regions (such as Brazil and the Caribbean) where the participation was "significant."
Wim Klooster wrote: "In no period did Jews play a leading role as financiers, shipowners, or factors in the Transatlantic or Caribbean slave trades. They possessed far fewer slaves than non-Jews in every British territory in North America and the Caribbean. Even when Jews in a handful of places owned slaves in proportions slightly above their representation among a town's families, such cases do not come close to corroborating the assertions of The Secret Relationship."
The Anti-Defamation League states that Volume Two of The Secret Relationship blames Jews for "promoting a myth of black racial inferiority and makes a range of conspiratorial accusations about Jewish involvement in the slave trade and in the cotton, textiles, and banking industries".
1991
The Crown Heights riot was a three-day anti Jewish pogrom that occurred from 19–21 August 1991 in the Crown Heights section of Brooklyn, New York City, in which Black residents attacked and killed Orthodox Jewish residents. The riots began on 19 August 1991, after two children of Guyanese immigrants were unintentionally struck by an automobile in the motorcade of Menachem Mendel Schneerson, the leader of a Jewish religious sect. One child died and the second was severely injured. This event pushed a group of black men to go into Crown Heights and kill a Jewish man.
In its wake, several Jews were seriously injured; one Orthodox Jewish man was killed; and a non-Jewish man, apparently mistaken by rioters for a Jew, was killed by a group of black men. The riots were a major issue in the 1993 mayoral race, contributing to the defeat of Mayor David Dinkins, an African American, who was blamed for an ineffective police response.
1991
In December 1991 the American Historical Association issued the following statement: The American Historical Association Council strongly deplores the publicly reported attempts to deny the fact of the Holocaust. No serious historian questions that the Holocaust took place. This followed a strong reaction by many of its members and commentary in the press against a near-unanimous decision that the AHA had made in May 1991 that studying the significance of the Holocaust should be encouraged. The association's May 1991 statement was in response to an incident where certain of its members had questioned the reality of the Holocaust. The December 1991 declaration is a reversal of the AHA's earlier stance that the association should not set a precedent by certifying historical facts.
1992 March 1
A bomb attack was carried out by two men at Neve Shalom Synagogue in Istanbul, Turkey causing no damage or casualties.
1993
In 1993, Todd Hindin filed a lawsuit against State Farm for allegedly keeping a list of prominent Jewish lawyers referred to within State Farm as the "Jewish Lawyers List". Any claims made by clients of these attorneys were automatically forwarded to State Farm's fraud unit, purely on the basis of the religion and national origin of the lawyers. These claims would then be neither settled nor paid. State Farm initially claimed that this was not a matter of discrimination, but of coincidence. However, Dr. Frank Taylor (an experienced economist on retainer for the Appellants) discovered that despite the fact that the population of the states involved had Jewish populations between 2–5% of the total population, the list was composed of nearly 80% religiously or ethnically Jewish lawyers. Individuals who had worked for State Farm, including former Divisional Claim Superintendent Ron Middler, testified that the list was indeed used to discriminate against ethnic minorities. State Farm paid out $30 million to Todd Hindin and his clients for discrimination on the basis of religion and national origin.
1994 February 25
Second Hebron massacre. Baruch Goldstein, a Jew, kills several Muslim worshippers; this leads to riots that kill both Muslims and Jews.
1994
On 1 March 1994, on the Brooklyn Bridge in New York City, Lebanese-born immigrant Rashid Baz shot at a van of 15 Chabad-Lubavitch Orthodox Jewish students that was traveling on the Brooklyn Bridge, killing one and injuring three others. See 1994 Brooklyn Bridge shooting.
1994, 20 March
Chris Lord, an individual associated with the Volksfront and American Front, fired ten rounds with an assault rifle into Temple Beth Israel (Eugene, Oregon), damaging the interior.
1994
AMIA bombing against the Jewish community of Buenos Aires.
1995
In February 1995 a Japanese magazine named Marco Polo, a 250,000-circulation monthly published by Bungei Shunju, ran a Holocaust denial article by physician Masanori Nishioka which stated:

The 'Holocaust' is a fabrication. There were no execution gas chambers in Auschwitz or in any other concentration camp. Today, what are displayed as 'gas chambers' at the remains of the Auschwitz camp in Poland are a post-war fabrication by the Polish communist regime or by the Soviet Union, which controlled the country. Not once, neither at Auschwitz nor in any territory controlled by the Germans during the Second World War, was there 'mass murder of Jews' in 'gas chambers.'

The Los Angeles-based Simon Wiesenthal Center instigated a boycott of Bungei Shunju advertisers, including Volkswagen, Mitsubishi, and Cartier. Within days, Bungei Shunju shut down Marco Polo and its editor, Kazuyoshi Hanada, quit, as did the president of Bungei Shunju, Kengo Tanaka.
1995
In Belgium, Holocaust denial was made illegal in 1995.
1996
In Turkey, in 1996, the Islamic preacher Harun Yahya distributed thousands of copies of a book which was originally published the previous year, entitled Soykırım Yalanı ("The Holocaust Lie") and mailed unsolicited texts to American and European schools and colleges. The publication of Soykırım Yalanı sparked much public debate. This book claims, "what is presented as Holocaust is the death of some Jews due to the typhus plague during the war and the famine towards the end of the war caused by the defeat of the Germans." In March 1996, a Turkish painter and intellectual, Bedri Baykam, published a strongly worded critique of the book in the Ankara daily newspaper Siyah-Beyaz ("Black and White"). A legal suit for slander was brought against him. During the trial in September, Baykam exposed the real author of the book as Adnan Oktar. The suit was withdrawn in March 1997.
1996
The depiction of Jews in some of T.S. Eliot's poems has led several critics to accuse him of antisemitism. This case has been presented most forcefully in a study by Anthony Julius: T. S. Eliot, Anti-Semitism, and Literary Form (1996). In "Gerontion", Eliot writes, in the voice of the poem's elderly narrator, "And the jew squats on the window sill, the owner [of my building] / Spawned in some estaminet of Antwerp." Another well-known example appears in the poem, "Burbank with a Baedeker: Bleistein with a Cigar". In this poem, Eliot wrote, "The rats are underneath the piles. / The jew is underneath the lot. / Money in furs." Interpreting the line as an indirect comparison of Jews to rats, Julius writes, "The anti-Semitism is unmistakable. It reaches out like a clear signal to the reader." Julius's viewpoint has been supported by literary critics such as Harold Bloom, Christopher Ricks, George Steiner, Tom Paulin and James Fenton.
1997
This year the European Parliament, of which Jean-Marie Le Pen was then a member, removed his parliamentary immunity so that Le Pen could be tried by a German court for comments he made at a December 1996 press conference before the German Republikaner party. Echoing his 1987 remarks in France (see above), Le Pen stated: "If you take a 1,000-page book on World War II, the concentration camps take up only two pages and the gas chambers 10 to 15 lines. This is what one calls a detail." In June 1999, a Munich court found this statement to be "minimizing the Holocaust, which caused the deaths of six million Jews," and convicted and fined Le Pen for his remarks. Le Pen retorted ironically: "I understand now that it's the Second World War which is a detail of the history of the gas chambers."
1997
Jean-Marie Le Pen accused Jacques Chirac of being "on the payroll of Jewish organizations, and particularly of the B'nai B'rith."
1997
In Luxembourg, Article 457–3 of the Criminal Code, Act of 19 July 1997 outlaws Holocaust denial and denial of other genocides. The punishment is imprisonment for between 8 days and 6 months and/or a fine.
1998
In a May 1998 interview with ABC's John Miller, Osama bin Laden stated that the Israeli state's ultimate goal was to annex the Arabian Peninsula and the Middle East into its territory and enslave its peoples, as part of what he called a "Greater Israel". He stated that Jews and Muslims could never get along and that war was "inevitable" between them, and further accused the U.S. of stirring up anti-Islamic sentiment. He claimed that the U.S. State Department and U.S. Department of Defense were controlled by Jews, for the sole purpose of serving the Israeli state's goals.
1998
In a December 1998 interview with Pakistani journalist Rahimullah Yusufzai, Osama bin Laden stated that Operation Desert Fox was proof that Israeli Jews controlled the governments of the United States and United Kingdom, directing them to kill as many Muslims as they could.
1999
Holocaust Remembrance Day has been commemorated as a national remembrance day in Sweden every year since 1999.
1999
Intelligence Ministry of Iran arrested 13 Iranian Jews, accusing them of spying for Israel. Arrestees were five merchants, a rabbi, two university professors, three teachers in private Hebrew schools, a kosher butcher and a 16-year-old boy. Ten of them were sentenced to 4–13 years in prison. As a result of the pressure campaigns and secret negotiations, the prisoners were gradually freed in small groups. All of them emigrated to Israel with their families.
1999
Abraham Foxman of the Anti-Defamation League, in an 11 October 1999, letter to The Washington Post claimed that A Republic, Not an Empire by Pat Buchanan "defends Charles Lindbergh against charges of anti-Semitism, not mentioning the infamous 1940 [sic] speech in which he accused the Jews of warmongering." Pat Buchanan denies this and points out Foxman's error, saying that he mentioned the 1941 speech to say it "ignited a national firestorm," which lingered after the aviator's death, and shows "the explosiveness of mixing ethnic politics and foreign policy."
1999
Richard Baumhammers was arrested in Paris, France for striking a 50-year-old female bartender named Vivianne Le Garrac because he "believed she was Jewish". Baumhammers then told both Le Garrac and the arresting officers that he was "mentally ill." The police took Baumhammers to the psychiatric ward of the Hôtel-Dieu de Paris for evaluation, then detained him at a police station. By week's end, he left on a flight for Spain.
1999
There were arson attacks in Sacramento, California – Congregation B'nai Israel, Congregation Beth Shalom, and Knesset Israel Torah Center. The fires caused over $1 million in damage. On 17 March 2000, brothers Benjamin Matthew Williams and James Tyler Williams were charged with setting the three synagogue fires and a 2 July fire at the Country Club Medical center, which housed an abortion clinic. The charges carried up to 235 years in prison. Matthew Williams later admitted to reporters that he was one of eight or nine men who set fire to the synagogues and the clinic; he also claimed that his brother Tyler had not been involved.
1999 August 10
Buford O. Furrow, Jr. kills mail carrier Joseph Santos Ileto and shoots five people in the August 1999 Los Angeles Jewish Community Center shooting.

== See also ==
- Timeline of antisemitism
- Timeline of anti-Zionism
- Vichy Holocaust collaboration timeline
