= Grand Anti-Masonic Exhibition =

Antisemitic exhibition that was opened on 22 October 1941

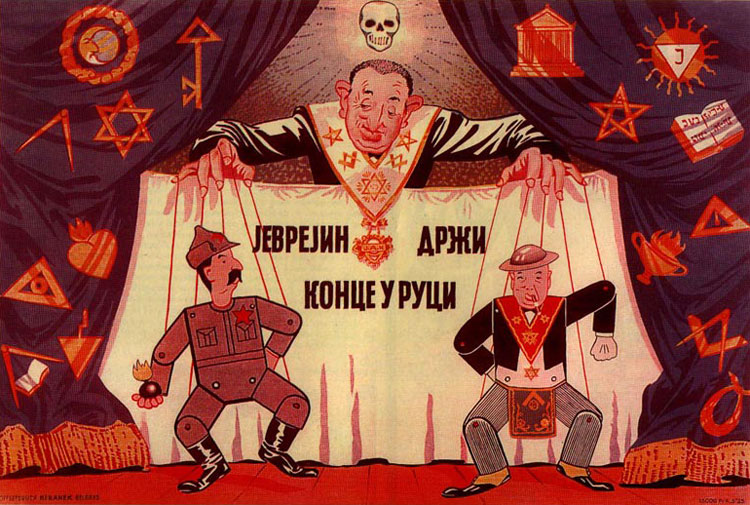
A poster from the exhibition

The Grand Anti-Masonic Exhibition (German: Anti-Freimaurer-Ausstellung, Serbian: Анти-масонска изложба) was the name of an antisemitic exhibition that was opened on October 22, 1941 during World War II in Belgrade, the capital of the Nazi Germany-established Militärverwaltung in occupied Serbia.

Financed by the Germans and opened with the support of collaborationist leader Milan Nedić, it featured an estimated 200,000 brochures, 108,000 copies of nine different types of envelopes, 100,000 flyers, 60,000 copies of twenty different posters, and 176 different propaganda films that had previously been seen during The Eternal Jew exhibitions in Munich and Vienna in 1937. Despite nominally being anti-Masonic, its purpose was to promote antisemitic ideas and intensify hatred of Jews. Certain displays were intended to dehumanize the Jewish people and justify their extermination by the Germans. Others resembled anti-Jewish propaganda from the period of the Russian Empire and repeated the claims put forward in the book The Protocols of the Elders of Zion. The exhibition was organized by former members of the fascist movement known as Zbor and sought to expose an alleged Judeo-Masonic/Communist conspiracy for world domination through several displays featuring antisemitic propaganda.

Four stamps commemorating the exhibition were issued by Serbian collaborationist authorities in January 1942, depicting Judaism as being the source of all evil in the world and portraying a "strong and victorious Serbia triumphing over the plot of world domination." An estimated 80,000 people, including collaborationist leader Milan Nedić and some of his ministers, visited the exhibition prior to its closure on January 19, 1942.

== Background ==
On 6 April 1941, Axis forces invaded the Kingdom of Yugoslavia. Poorly equipped and poorly trained, the Royal Yugoslav Army was quickly defeated. The country was then dismembered, with the Wehrmacht establishing the Territory of the Military Commander in Serbia under a government of military occupation. The territory included most of Serbia proper, with the addition of the northern part of Kosovo (around Kosovska Mitrovica), and the Banat. It was the only area of occupied Yugoslavia in which the Germans established a military government. This was done to exploit the key rail and riverine transport routes that passed through it, and because of its valuable resources, particularly non-ferrous metals. The Military Commander in Serbia appointed Serbian puppet governments to "carry on administrative chores under German direction and supervision". The Germans also promoted the fascist Yugoslav National Movement (Zbor), led by Dimitrije Ljotić.

Meanwhile, the extreme Croat nationalist and fascist Ante Pavelić, who had been in exile in Benito Mussolini's Italy, was appointed Poglavnik (leader) of an Ustaše-led Croatian state – the Independent State of Croatia (often called the NDH, from the Croatian: Nezavisna Država Hrvatska). The NDH combined almost all of modern-day Croatia, all of modern-day Bosnia and Herzegovina and parts of modern-day Serbia into an "Italian-German quasi-protectorate." NDH authorities, led by the Ustaše militia, implemented genocidal policies against the Serb, Jewish and Romani population living within the borders of the new state. As a result, two resistance movements emerged in Yugoslavia – the Serb royalist Chetniks, led by Colonel Draža Mihailović, and the multi-ethnic, Communist Yugoslav Partisans, led by Josip Broz Tito.

On 29 August 1941, the Germans appointed the Government of National Salvation (Serbian: Vlada Nacionalnog Spasa, Влада Националног Спаса) under General Milan Nedić, to replace the short-lived Commissioner Administration. Nedić, a pre-war politician, believed since the defeat of France in the 1940 that the Germans would emerge as the winners in World War II and sought to protect the Serbian people from German retaliation by cooperating with the Axis. Resistance to the Germans emerged immediately and caused the German High Command to declare that a hundred Serbs would be executed for every German soldier killed and fifty Serbs would be executed for every German soldier wounded. By October 1941, the Germans executed more than 25,000 Serbs in various revenge killings throughout the occupied territory.

Upon capturing Belgrade in April, the Germans ordered the city's 12,000 Jews to report themselves to the occupational authorities. Laws were then passed which prohibited Jews from various activities in the occupied territory, ranging from going to restaurants to riding streetcars. Jews were ordered to wear identifying armbands on which the word "Jew" (Serbian: Jevrejin) was painted in black letters. Some Serbs accused the Jews of being behind the Yugoslav coup d'état which resulted in the Axis invasion of Yugoslavia and Nedić went so far as to call the Partisans a "criminal Jewish gang."

== Exhibition ==
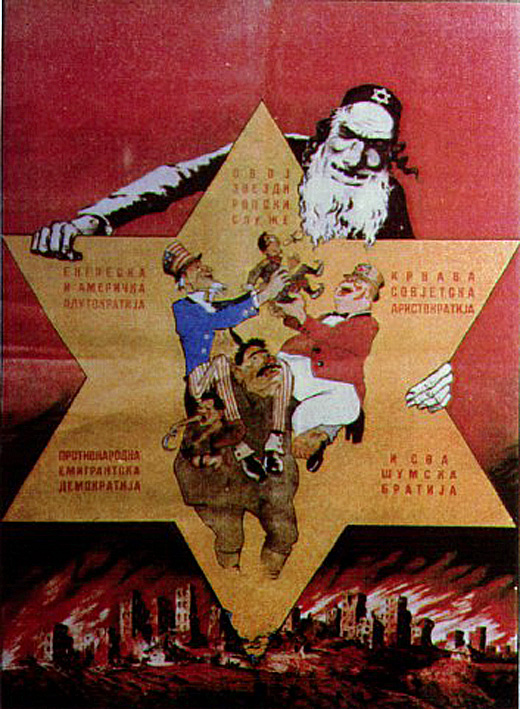
A poster depicting Chetnik leader Draža Mihailović as being an agent of the supposedly Jewish-controlled United States and United Kingdom

The Grand Anti-Masonic Exhibition opened in Belgrade on 22 October 1941 at 8 Ilija Garašanin Street. The Belgrade exhibit was organized by former members of Zbor and sought to expose an alleged Judeo-Masonic/Communist conspiracy for world domination through several displays featuring antisemitic propaganda. It was funded by the Germans and opened with Nedić's support. Despite nominally being anti-Masonic, its purpose was to promote antisemitic ideas and intensify hatred of Jews. Certain displays were intended to dehumanize the Jewish people and justify their extermination by the Germans. Others resembled anti-Jewish propaganda from the period of the Russian Empire and repeated the claims put forward in the book The Protocols of the Elders of Zion. Besides the exhibits themselves, large amounts of propaganda material were prepared. An estimated 200,000 brochures, 108,000 copies of nine different types of envelopes, 100,000 flyers, 60,000 copies of twenty different posters, 176 propaganda films and four postage stamps designed specially for the occasion were presented to visitors. The posters in particular have been described by historian Raphael Israeli as "[giving] a sense of the vile flavour of the exhibition and the theme of Jewish dominance." In general, the exhibition itself has been deemed "bizarre" and "heavily antisemitic" by historians. Author Philip J. Cohen describes it as "vicious anti-Jewish propaganda."

The organizers of the exhibition created advertisements that read: "This concept of exhibition will be unique not only in Serbia and the Balkans, not only in southeastern Europe and Europe, but in the world." However, the images depicted were not unique as they had been previously seen in 1937 during The Eternal Jew exhibitions in Munich and Vienna. Serbian collaborationist newspapers such as Obnova (Renewal) and Naša Borba (Our Struggle) wrote positively of the exhibit, declaring Jews to be "the ancient enemies of the Serbian people" and that "Serbs should not wait for the Germans to begin the extermination of the Jews." Obnova reported that 20,000 people had visited the exhibit by 27 October.

In January 1942, Serbian collaborationist authorities issued stamps commemorating the exhibition. The stamps portrayed a "strong and victorious Serbia triumphing over the plot of world domination". Juxtaposing Serbian and Jewish symbols, the stamps depicted Judaism as being the source of all evil in the world while promoting the Serbian humiliation and violent subjugation of the Jews. They also ensured that every time a person mailed a letter they would be reminded that Jews, Masons and Communists were the supposed enemies of the Serbian people. The exhibition lasted until 19 January 1942, when it was closed. By then, it had been visited by an estimated 80,000 people, including Nedić and some of his ministers.

== See also ==
- Antisemitic Exhibition in Zagreb, opened in May 1942 in the Independent State of Croatia.
