= Ernst Hiemer =

German writer

Ernst Hiemer (5 July 1900 in Großweingarten – 29 July 1974 in Altötting) was a German writer, who worked closely with Julius Streicher, the founder of the antisemitic newspaper Der Stürmer. Hiemer's three main books were all published in the Second World War and had antisemitic themes.

== Biography ==
Hiemer began working with Julius Streicher in the 1920s, as a journalist for Streicher's weekly antisemitic newspaper Der Stürmer, for which he reported on trials of Jewish offenders. Using the knowledge and experience he had gained working as a teacher, Hiemer wrote two antisemitic books for children which were both published by Julius Streicher's Stürmer publishing house. The first of these was Der Giftpilz (The Poisonous Mushroom), published in 1938. This was a collection of 17 short stories, illustrated by 'Fips' (Philipp Rupprecht). It was followed in 1940 by another collection, Der Pudelmopsdackelpinscher und andere besinnliche Erzahlungen (The Poodle-Pug-Dachshund-Pinscher and other contemplative stories), which compared Jews to various forms of animals. These publications were amongst the most extreme antisemitic items produced for children under the Nazi regime, causing them to be the subject of negative comments from some Nazis. During this time, Hiemer was also the chief editor of Der Stürmer. In 1942, he published a collection of antisemitic proverbs entitled Der Jude im Sprichwort der Völker.

After the war, Hiemer was interned for three and a half years at Stalag XIII-D, and banned from teaching for life. He died on 29 July 1974 in Altötting, Bavaria.

== Bibliography ==
- Der Giftpilz (The Poisonous Mushroom) (Nuremberg: Stürmerverlag, 1938).
- Der Pudelmopsdackelpinscher (The Poodle-Pug-Dachshund-Pinscher, 1940) (Nuremberg: Der Stürmer-Buchverlag)
- Der Jude im Sprichwort der Völker (Nuremberg, 1942)
