= The Eternal Jew (art exhibition) =

1937–38 anti-semitic propaganda exhibition in Nazi Germany

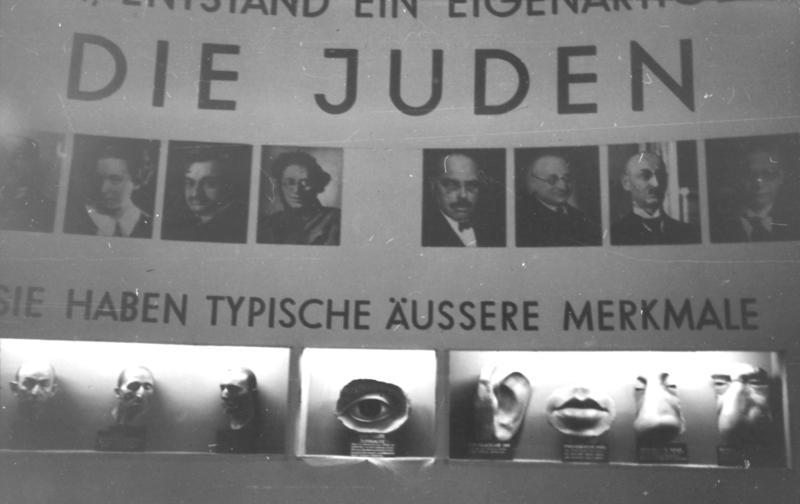
Grotesque caricatures in the exhibition at the Deutsches Museum, Munich

The Eternal Jew (German: Der ewige Jude) was an exhibition of antisemitism displayed at the Library of the German Museum in Munich from 8 November 1937 to 31 January 1938. The displays, with photographs and caricatures, focused on antisemitic canards falsely accusing Jews of negatively affecting Nazi Germany through Cultural Bolshevism, exemplified in the exhibition poster presenting a kaftan-wearing "eastern" Jew holding gold coins in one hand and a whip in the other. The exhibition attracted 412,300 visitors, over 5,000 per day.

The content was polemical and misleading, being based on Nazi propaganda rather than on truthful or factual material. Other canards promoted by the exhibition included the myths of Jewish wealth and avoidance of work, false allegations of Jewish criminality, and other blatant racial stereotypes. It was designed to support the Nazis' antisemitic doctrines with caricatures of alleged Jewish physiognomy and looks, and examples of famous Jews such as Albert Einstein and other well-known scientists, authors and intellectuals, such as the mistaken inclusion of Charlie Chaplin.

The exhibition was sponsored by Joseph Goebbels, the Reich Minister of Propaganda, who held well-known extreme antisemitic opinions. He had a long history of rabid antisemitism before the Nazis gained power in 1933, and he organized a boycott of Jewish shops in the same year, as well as notorious book burnings of Jewish authors among many others. He initiated the destruction of numerous synagogues during Kristallnacht in November 1938, and as a result of which many Jews were killed by Nazi mobs, or deported by the thousands to Nazi concentration camps. Nazi antisemitism ended with the Holocaust and the murder of 4,000,000 to 7,000,000 Jews in ghettos, Nazi concentration camps and Nazi death camps, mainly but not exclusively in eastern Europe. The Nazis had, at the time of the exhibition, already removed citizen rights from German Jews, and imposed very strict racist laws against Jews marrying so-called "Aryans" under the Nuremberg Laws as well as denying Jews the right to work in many professions, such as the law, medicine and teaching. Many had been evicted from their homes as Berlin was being developed by Albert Speer and most would be evacuated to the east and murdered there. After World War II began in September 1939, such antisemitic policies were extended to occupied countries, and indeed developed much further by killing squads (or Einsatzgruppen) in Poland for example, who targeted Jews specifically.

After the exhibition ended in Munich, it was displayed in Vienna from 2 August until 23 October 1938 and subsequently in Berlin from 12 November 1938 until 31 January 1939.

== Hippler film ==
The title The Eternal Jew was used for a film released in 1940 and directed by Fritz Hippler, one of the most violently antisemitic films made by the Nazis and a commercial flop. It was sponsored by Joseph Goebbels at the Ministry of Public Enlightenment and Propaganda. Apparently, many German viewers were disturbed by the scenes from the Warsaw Ghetto and the film was a commercial failure. There were many scenes from the ghetto where large numbers of Polish Jews were trapped by the Germans and slowly starved to death by the restrictions placed on food entering the closely guarded ghetto walls. Pictures of starving and emaciated children and adults were portrayed in the movie to show how "degenerate" the Jews were, neglecting to mention that they were in their pitiable state as a direct result of German persecution.

== See also ==
- Degenerate Art exhibition
- Grand Anti-Masonic Exhibition
- Antisemitic Exhibition in Zagreb
