= Bet Shira Congregation =

- Location within Miami

Religion
- Affiliation: Conservative Judaism
- Ecclesiastical or organisational status: Synagogue
- Leadership: Rabbi Jesse Charyn
- Status: Active

Location
- Location: 7500 SW 120th Street, Miami, Florida
- Country: United States
- Coordinates: 25°39′31″N 80°19′2″W

Architecture
- Type: Synagogue
- Established: 1985 (as a congregation)
- Completed: 1988 (in current location)

Website
- www.betshira.org

Bet Shira Congregation is a Conservative synagogue located at 7500 SW 120th Street in Miami, Florida, in the United States.

== History ==
In February 1985, a nucleus of families left Congregation Beth David to form a new congregation, Bet Shira. The membership grew to 300 families in the weeks that followed. The name "Bet Shira" (House of Song) was selected to reflect the upbeat and dynamic character of the founders. In May 1988, the Letty Roth Synagogue Complex was dedicated as was the Arin Stacey Applebaum Sanctuary.

In August 1992, Hurricane Andrew badly damaged the synagogue.

In 2005, the synagogue was serving 500 families. That year, Sam Rosen of Bet Shira Congregation was chosen as co-winner of the Jewish community's Teacher of the Year, Excellence in Teaching Award by the Center for the Advancement of Jewish Education. In 2007, the synagogue acquired a Torah scroll that during World War II had been smuggled out of the Polish town of Tarnów, when it was invaded by Nazis and its Jewish population destroyed, and protected by monks in a monastery near Kiev until the Soviet Union collapsed. In 2016 Samuel El Olom congregation joined Bet Shira.

== Community programs ==
Bet Shira hosts programs and events every year, where volunteers, and members engage in activities such as: Beautification of community sites, blood drives; and food drives.[{/}]

The synagogue's Early Childhood Center was also a site of "Project Kavod", a three-year pilot program in improving the culture of employment in early childhood, by the Coalition for the Advancement of Jewish Education, which was launched in 2004.

=== Drive-through sukkah ===
In 2011, for the holiday of Sukkot, Bet Shira erected what is believed to be the first and only drive-through Sukkah, a tent in the parking lot of the synagogue that it calls the "McBet Shira Sukkah", allowing the community to participate in the celebration of the holiday from the convenience of their cars. Members of the public drove into the sukkah, parked, lowered their car window, and said the blessings for the holiday, including shaking a lulav and an etrog, as volunteers handed them snacks at the end of their visit.

== Clergy and staff ==
David H. Auerbach was the founding rabbi of the synagogue. He is from Montreal, Canada, and had served as rabbi of Ahavat Achim synagogue in Atlanta, Georgia, and then senior rabbi of Beth David Congregation in Miami prior to the founding of Bet Shira. Since his retirement in 2005, he served as the rabbi emeritus of the synagogue, until his passing in September 2016. In 2005, Rabbi Auerbach was followed by Micah Caplan, until 2010. In July 2010, Brian Schuldenfrei assumed the post of senior rabbi. Schuldenfrei had been associate rabbi at Sinai Temple in Los Angeles, California.

Mark Kula, brother of Rabbi Irwin Kula, assumed the post of cantor in 1989. In 2013 Mark was appointed the Rabbi of the congregation and served as Rabbi until 2018. In 2019, Ben Herman was hired as Bet Shira's rabbi. Since 2023,Jesse Charyn has been serving as the Bet Shira Rabbi.

In 2008, the synagogue appointed Renée Rittner as its education director. Efrat Horwitz is the education director.

== Religious school ==
The synagogue offers Jewish education for students from pre-kindergarten through 12th grade. Its Hebrew School serves students from pre-kindergarten through seventh grade, with a curriculum focused on Jewish knowledge, heritage, worship, community involvement, and Jewish identity. Teen education continues through 12th grade and includes learning opportunities with clergy and educators, Jewish traditions and values, community engagement, and social experiences. Students participate in Confirmation in 10th grade. The synagogue also offers youth programming for children in kindergarten through 12th grade, providing social, educational, and Jewish experiences for different age groups. High school students participate in the youth movement of the United Synagogue of Conservative Judaism, with opportunities for local chapter activities, regional programs, leadership, community service, and Jewish engagement.

== Customs ==
The congregation is the only egalitarian conservative synagogue south of Miami and is affiliated with the United Synagogue of Conservative Judaism. As implied by its name (House of Song), Bet Shira values music and its incorporation into daily and ritual life. Although regular services are held in traditional style, without musical instruments, Friday evening Shabbat services include music. Bet Shira hosts weekly Havdalah and daily Minyan by Zoom with occasional hybrid Zoom and in person Minyans.
