= Der Giftpilz =

1938 antisemitic children's book

The Poisonous Mushroom
- Cover illustration. The text is in the Sütterlin script.
- Author: Ernst Hiemer
- Original title: Der Giftpilz
- Illustrator: Philipp Rupprecht (Fips)
- Language: German
- Genre: Children's literature, Antisemitism
- Publisher: Julius Streicher
- Publication date: 1938
- Publication place: Germany
- Media type: Print
- Pages: 56
- Dewey Decimal: 833.912

Der Giftpilz (German for "The Poisonous Mushroom" or "The Poisonous Toadstool", pronounced [dɛɐ̯ ˈɡɪftpɪlts]) is a piece of antisemitic Nazi propaganda published as a children's book by Julius Streicher in 1938. The text is by Ernst Hiemer, with illustrations by Philipp Rupprecht (also known as Fips); the title alludes to how, just as it is difficult to tell a poisonous mushroom from an edible mushroom, it is difficult to tell a Jew apart from a non-Jew. The book purports to warn German children about the dangers allegedly posed by Jews to them personally, and to German society in general.

After the war, Streicher was convicted of being an accessory for crimes against humanity in the Nuremberg trials and executed in 1946. Rupprecht served five years in prison. Hiemer was imprisoned for 3 1/2 years and banned from teaching for life.

== Antisemitism ==
The book falsely claims that the Talmud discourages Jews from performing manual labour and encourages them to engage in trade instead; that it teaches Jews that non-Jews are meant to be slaves and asks Jews to enslave the non-Jewish population; and that Talmudic law allows Jews to cheat non-Jews.

The weekly Der Stürmer boasted that 10,000 copies had been sold in the first seven days after the book reached bookstores. According to various estimates, the total print run amounted to either 40,000 or 60,000 copies.

The book was sometimes used in German schools. A copy of the book is held by the U.S. Holocaust Memorial Museum in Washington, D.C.

An English-language translation of the book was produced by U.S. neo-Nazi activist Gary Lauck, and thereafter marketed on his website for $10. Lauck also produced an Estonian-language translation in 2007, and claims to be working on translations into many other languages. The Estonian Internal Security Service has investigated the case under the section of Estonian penal code criminalizing incitement to social hatred, but concluded that it is unlikely to have the jurisdiction or means to prosecute the author, as under American law, websites are covered by the First Amendment to the United States Constitution.

== See also ==
- Trust No Fox on his Green Heath and No Jew on his Oath
- The Protocols of the Elders of Zion
