= Volksfront =

American white separatist group

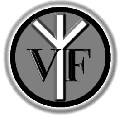
- Emblem
- Founded: 1994
- Founder: Randal Lee Krager and Richard Arden
- Founding location: Oregon State Prison
- Years active: 1994–2012
- Territory: United States, and several European nations
- Ethnicity: White
- Allies: Blood & Honour, Hammerskins

Volksfront, also known as Volksfront International, was an American white separatist organization founded on October 20, 1994, in Portland, Oregon. According to Volksfront's now defunct website, the group described itself as an "international fraternal organization for persons of European descent." The logo of Volksfront was the Algiz rune, a common rune used as a neo-Nazi symbol common among other organizations such as National Alliance. Volksfront had approximately 50 members in the United States split between four chapters designated as Pac-West, Central States, North East, and Gulf-Atlantic, and an additional 50 members dispersed in other countries including Germany, Netherlands, the United Kingdom, Canada, Australia, and Spain. The goal of the movement was to create an all-White homeland in the Pacific Northwest. The flag of Volksfront was based on the Nazi flag in the colors of black, white, and red with the Volksfront logo and the slogan was "Race Over All" implying that race mattered over everything else. In August 2012, the United States branch of Volksfront announced their dissolution via their website. Citing harassment and investigations by the authorities, the group said it was disbanding.

The Anti-Defamation League has written that Volksfront was "one of the most active skinhead groups in the United States." The Southern Poverty Law Center (SPLC) included Volksfront in its list of hate groups. The group has been called "neo-Nazi" and a "racist-skinhead group" in press reports.

== History ==
Volksfront (from the Dutch/German for "people's front") was founded by Randal Lee Krager and Richard Arden while incarcerated in an Oregon state prison in 1994. Formed from the remnants of several fractured Portland skinhead gangs in 1994, including East Side White Pride, whose members were convicted of the murder of Ethiopian Immigrant Mulegeta Seraw. Krager was serving two years for a 1992 assault on an African-American man who was left paralyzed and a conviction of first-degree intimidation for threatening to murder an anti-fascist activist, Pan Nesbitt. A grand jury declined to indict him for charges involving hate crimes, but the judge doubled the length of his sentence due to Krager having a swastika tattoo. Krager did not agree with the sentence as he claimed that the judge denied him the right to bring in evidence. Krager contended the victim was attempting a sexual assault, although no charges were brought against the victim. After being paroled in 1996, Krager's recruiting efforts made Volksfront a potent force along the West Coast. According to Krager's parole officer, Krager distributed Nazi leaflets and frequently met with white supremacist associates. Krager told reporter Philip Dawdy of the Willamette Week that America was becoming too brown, diluting its "European-American culture," and that all minorities in the Northwest "will be repatriated."

Algiz rune on Volksfront flag

A number of Volksfront's members were linked with the Hammerskins, a white supremacist group formed in Texas, and Blood & Honour, a group founded in the United Kingdom in 1987. One of Volksfront's stated goals was to create an all-white private community. Volksfront held several events, including weekend-long concerts with speeches, two or three times a year. The group also held organizational gatherings and memorial parties in remembrance of white nationalists who had been murdered or imprisoned around the world. An annual Volksfront event called Althing was held south of St. Louis, Missouri at the group's Samuel Weaver Memorial Hall, which was named after the son of Randy Weaver, who was killed by federal agents in 1992. Althing is a reference to the ancient parliamentary system of Scandinavia.

In late 2001, Volksfront requested to join the Coalition Against Hate Crimes (CAHC), an organization based in Oregon which had been started by the American Jewish Committee. In an anonymous email, an alleged Volksfront member wrote "I think we would represent a currently unrepresented segment of our society on the issue of hate crimes and would therefore be a big asset." A CAHC representative stated "They weren't trying to join us because they believed what we believed. That was not their purpose." In the end, Volksfront was not invited to join CAHC. The Southern Poverty Law Center commented on the non-acceptance by stating that Volksfront was "working to turn the Pacific Northwest into an all-white Aryan homeland—an end it says it will reach by deporting people of color."

In June 2004, Kurtis Monschke, 20, an alleged probationary member for Volksfront, was sentenced to life in prison for his role in the murder of Randall Mark Townsend, 42, in Tacoma, Washington, on March 23, 2003. Volksfront denies that Mr. Monschke was a member of the organization. Prosecutors alleged that Monschke, who has the Volksfront emblem tattooed on his chest adjacent to a swastika, instigated the attack in an effort to establish himself with higher-ranking members of Volksfront. During the trial, the defense admitted that Monschke was a member of Volksfront but asserted that the organization was nonviolent. Volksfront immediately condemned the attack and urged those involved be prosecuted.

In April 2007, Jacob Albert Laskey, alleged to be Volksfront's Prisoner Affairs Coordinator in Eugene, Oregon, was sentenced to 11 years in federal prison for his role in a "racially-motivated attack" on the Temple Beth Israel. According to the FBI, Laskey is a "self-avowed white supremacist who admitted that he sought to commit acts of violence and destruction against Jews, African-Americans, and members of other ethnic and racial groups." A few months later in November 2007, Laskey's brother, Gabriel Laskey, was sentenced to six months' incarceration for his role in the attack.

Volksfront was alleged to have been involved in, or had knowledge of, the shooting of Luke Querner, an anti-racist activist in Portland. No charges have been brought.

In August 2012, after Wade Michael Page committed the Wisconsin Sikh temple shooting, it became known that his girlfriend, Misty Cook, had been associated with Volksfront. A few days later, the group announced via its website that Volkfront was disbanding, citing concerns over law enforcement investigations into their members. The website ceased operations shortly thereafter, along with a blog and Facebook page.

According to the Anti-Defamation League, Volksfront was a virulently racist, rebellious, anti-authoritarian and anti-semitic group that had become the most active neo-Nazi group on the west coast of the United States, and which maintained close alliances with many other hate groups.

== See also ==
- List of white nationalist organizations
