= 1999 arrest of Iranian Jews =

- Court: Islamic Revolutionary Court, Fars province, 3rd branch

Court membership
- Judge sitting: Sadegh Nourani

In 1999, the Intelligence Ministry of Iran arrested 13 Iranian Jews, accusing them of spying for Mossad. Security agents arrested 13 Jewish residents of the Iranian cities of Shiraz and Isfahan, including five merchants, a rabbi, two university professors, three teachers in private Hebrew schools, a kosher butcher, and a 16-year-old boy, accusing them of spying for Israel. After a trial in Islamic Revolutionary Court, 10 were sentenced to 4–13 years in prison. The Israeli government and many U.S. Jewish groups and Jewish federations worldwide organized a pressure campaign globally against the Government of Iran, with demonstrations in front of Iranian embassies worldwide.

As a result of the pressure campaigns and secret negotiations, the prisoners were gradually freed in small groups. The last prisoners were released on February 19, 2003. First news was leaked online on March 18, but the news was ignored amid the 2003 Invasion of Iraq. All of them emigrated to Israel and live there with their families. The arrests have later been described as discriminatory in the broader view of antisemitism in Iran.

== See also ==
- History of the Jews in Iran
- Iranian Jews in Israel
- Allahdad
- 1910 Shiraz blood libel
