= Temple Beth Israel (Eugene, Oregon) =

Synagogue in Eugene, Oregon

- Hebrew: בית ישראל
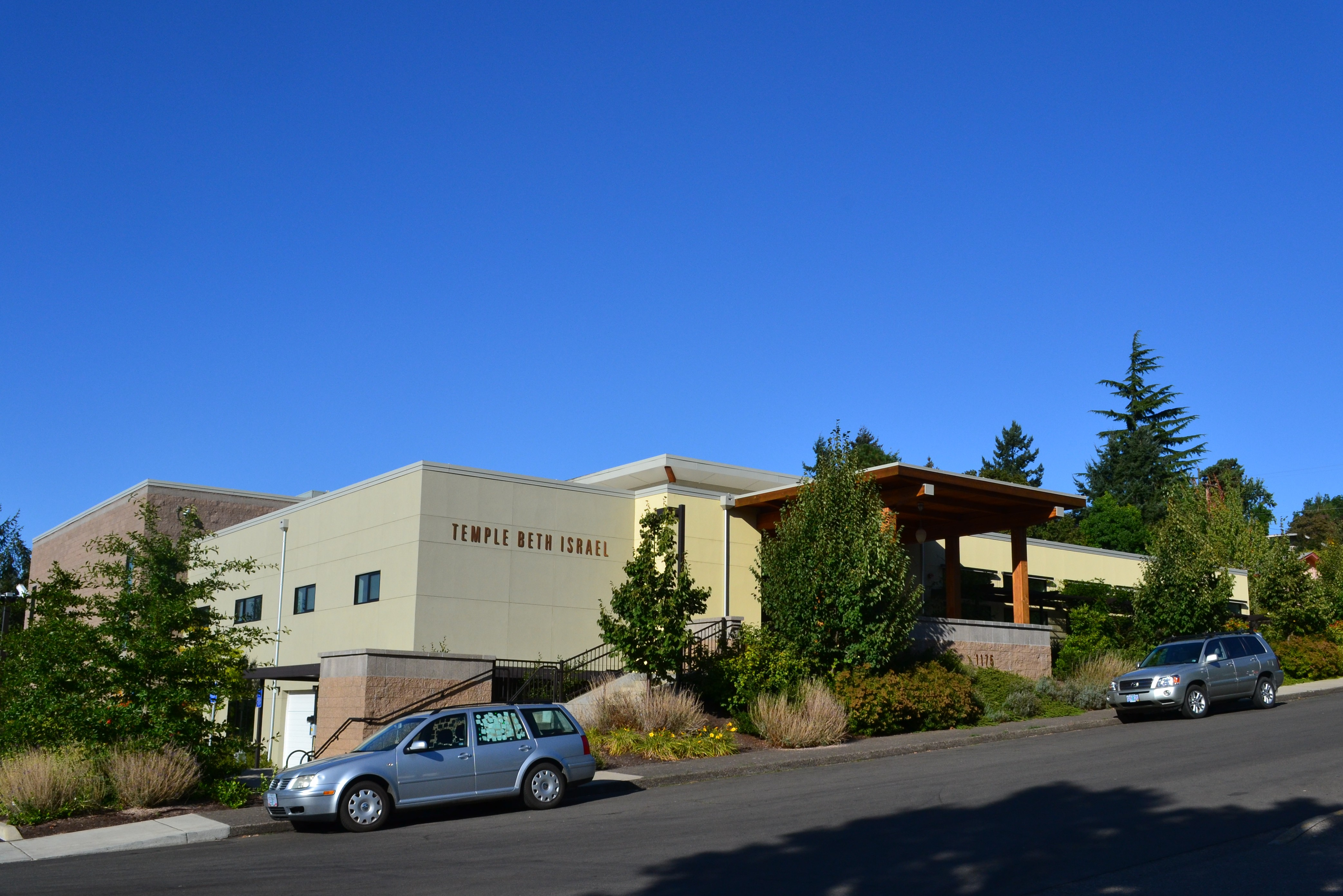
- Temple Beth Israel

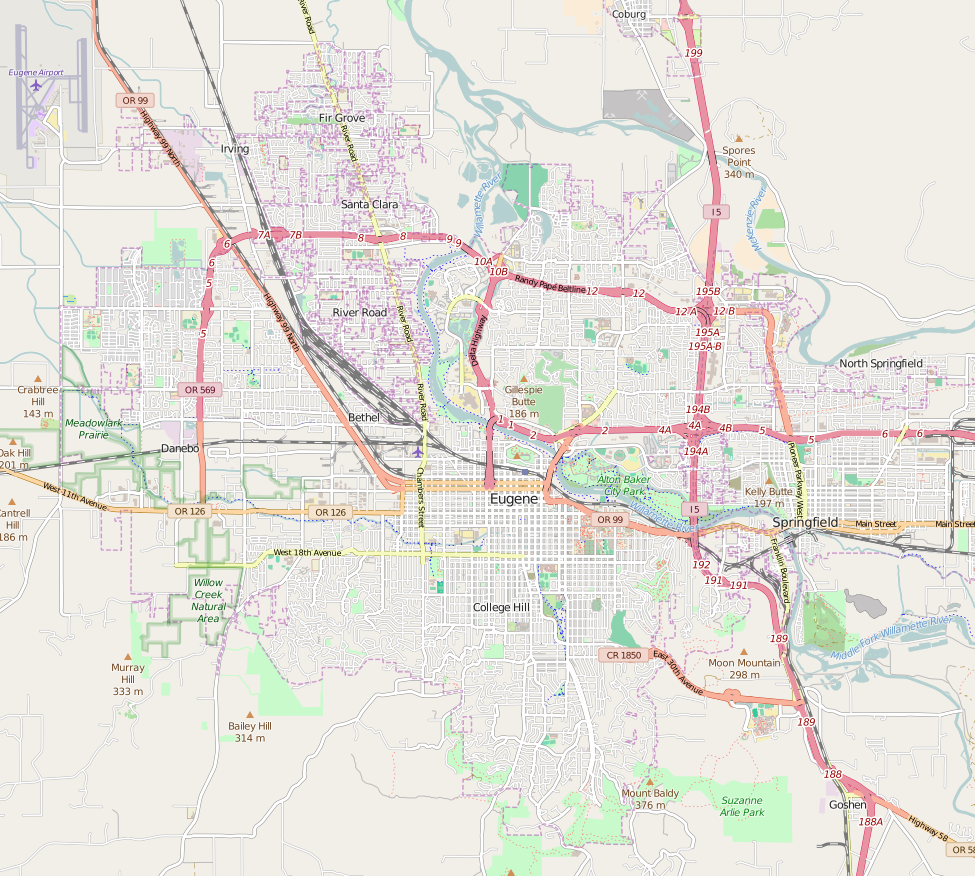
- Location in Eugene, Oregon

Religion
- Affiliation: Reconstructionist Judaism
- Ecclesiastical or organisational status: Synagogue
- Leadership: Rabbi Ruhi Sophia Motzkin Rubenstein; Rabbi Yitzhak Husbands-Hankin (Emeritus)
- Status: Active

Location
- Location: 1175 East 29th Avenue, Eugene, Oregon
- Country: United States
- Coordinates: 44°01′33″N 123°04′31″W

Architecture
- Architects: Mel Solomon and Associates; TBG Architects & Planners
- Type: Synagogue
- General contractor: McKenzie Commercial Construction
- Established: c. 1930s
- Completed: 2008
- Construction cost: $6 million

Specifications
- Capacity: 900+
- Materials: Concrete, steel, wood

Website
- www.tbieugene.org

Temple Beth Israel (Hebrew: בית ישראל) is a Reconstructionist synagogue located at 1175 East 29th Avenue in Eugene, Oregon, in the United States. Founded in the early 1930s as a Conservative congregation, Beth Israel was for many decades the only synagogue in Eugene.

The congregation initially worshipped in a converted house on West Eighth Street. It constructed its first building on Portland Street in 1952, and occupied its current LEED-compliant facilities in 2008.

In the early 1990s conflict between feminist and traditional members led to the latter leaving Beth Israel, and forming the Orthodox Congregation Ahavas Torah. Beth Israel came under attack from neo-Nazi members of the Volksfront twice, in 1994 and again in 2002. In both cases the perpetrators were caught and convicted.

Services were lay-led for decades. Marcus Simmons was hired as the congregation's first rabbi in 1959, but left in 1961. After a gap of two years, Louis Neimand became rabbi in 1963, and served until his death in 1976. He was followed by Myron Kinberg, who served from 1977 to 1994, and Kinberg in turn was succeeded by Yitzhak Husbands-Hankin. Maurice Harris joined Husbands-Hankin as associate rabbi in 2003, and served until 2011, when he was succeeded by Boris Dolin. In 2015 Rabbi Husbands-Hankin retired and became Rabbi Emeritus. The congregation became a one-rabbi synagogue and hired Rabbi Ruhi Sophia Motzkin Rubenstein to serve as Rabbi. Beth Israel has approximately 400 member households, and is the largest synagogue in Eugene.

== Early history ==
Small numbers of German Jews began settling in Eugene in the late 19th century, but most moved on. In the early 20th century the first Eastern European Jews settled there, and by the 1920s Eugene's Jewish community began gathering prayer quorums for holding Friday night and Jewish holiday services in individuals' homes. Historian Steven Lowenstein writes that "[a]fter Hymen Rubenstein's death in 1933, his home at 231 West Eighth Street was remodeled and named Temple Beth Israel". It was a traditional Conservative synagogue, and from that time until the 1990s it was the only synagogue in Eugene.

In 1952, the congregation constructed a one-story synagogue building on an almost 1 acre (0.40 ha) property at 2550 Portland Street. Designed by architect and Holocaust-survivor Heinrich Hormuth (H.H.) Waechter, the building featured an interior courtyard that provided natural lighting, and "a network of ceiling beams painted with symbols and shapes" by Waechter.

Temple Beth Israel's services and religious functions were lay-led for decades. Its first rabbi was Marcus Simmons. Originally from England, he was a graduate of University of London and Oxford University, and was ordained at the Hebrew Theological College. He emigrated to the United States in 1957, and joined Beth Israel in 1959. The members were not, however, agreed that a full-time rabbi was required, and in 1961, he accepted a rabbinical position in Downey, California.

Following a hiatus of two years, Louis Neimand was hired as rabbi in 1963. Born in New York City in 1912 to immigrant parents, he was a graduate of City University of New York and was ordained at the Jewish Institute of New York. He had previously worked for the United Jewish Appeal, and from 1959 to 1963 was the first Hillel rabbi at Syracuse University. There was some concern about Neimand's hiring, as he had a police record as a result of his involvement in freedom marches during the Civil Rights Movement. He served until his death in 1976.

== Kinberg era ==
Myron Kinberg was hired as rabbi in 1977. Ordained in Reform Judaism, he had previously served as a rabbi in Topeka, Kansas for two years, then lived in Israel for two years, before coming to Eugene. Kinberg was known for his support for minority rights and gay rights, anti-nuclear and anti-war activism, support of reconciliation between Israel and the Palestinians, and outreach to non-observant members of Eugene's Jewish community.

Kinberg attempted to revive the Biblical concept of the "ger toshav" in his approach to intermarriage. He was willing to officiate at an intermarriage if the non-Jewish partner, after discussions with the rabbi, agreed of his or her own free will to fulfill a set of commitments, including "a commitment to a Jewish home life, participation in Jewish life and tradition, and raising future children as Jews". The non-Jewish partner making this commitment became a "ger toshav", or "non-Jewish member of the Jewish people".

Kinberg's wife Alice was a strong feminist, and during the 1980s he and his wife supported a number of changes to the liturgy and ritual. These included allowing women to read from the Torah and lead the prayers, and changing prayers to be more gender inclusive - for example, using gender-neutral terms and pronouns for God, and adding references to the Biblical matriarchs in prayers like the Amidah, which traditionally only mentioned the Biblical patriarchs. While most congregation members approved of these changes, a minority resisted them.

=== Schism ===
By the early 1990s serious divisions developed among the members of the congregation over a number of issues, including personal antagonisms, the rabbi's activism and "advocacy of 'ultra-liberal' causes", political differences over the Israeli–Palestinian conflict, and

a myriad of additional Jewish cultural/religious issues, such as the acceptance of intermarried couples, adherence to kosher dietary laws, the use of modern language and music during worship services, rewriting of certain prayers such as the Aleynu to make them less ethnocentric, and so on.

However, the biggest source of division, which underlay all others, was "the roles and rights of men and women in the synagogue."

In the early 1990s a group of newly observant members began holding more traditional services in a back room of the synagogue, complete with a mechitza, a partition separating men and women. The "more feminist-minded" members strongly objected to having a mechitza anywhere in the Temple Beth Israel building, even if it were not in the services they attended. The latter group eventually circulated a petition which stated that either the mechitza would have to be taken down, or those members who wanted it would have to leave. Kinberg also signed the petition. Faced with this opposition, in 1992 the Orthodox members left, renting new premises and hiring their own rabbi, creating Eugene's second synagogue, originally called "The Halachic Minyan", and in 1998 renamed "Congregation Ahavas Torah".

Kinberg held himself responsible, and the schism led to his "reassessment of the needs of Temple Beth Israel and his role as a rabbi". As a result, he left Beth Israel in 1994 to lead a synagogue on Long Island. During his tenure at Beth Israel, membership rose from 118 to 350 families. Kinberg died two years later at age 51.

== Husbands-Hankin era ==
Yitzhak Husbands-Hankin succeeded Kinberg in 1995. Husbands-Hankin began his involvement at Temple Beth Israel first as a congregant, then as cantor, and then as an assistant rabbi. He was active in forming the Jewish Renewal movement, and was ordained by its leader Zalman Schachter-Shalomi.

The congregation decided to leave the Conservative movement in 1995, and for a year had no affiliation. In late 1996, after considering both Reform and Reconstructionist as alternatives, the congregation affiliated with the Reconstructionist movement. By 1999, membership had grown to around 370 families.

Husbands-Hankin was instrumental in developing the concept of "Ethical Kashrut", the idea that one should only purchase goods that are produced in an ethical way. His essay, "Ethical Kashrut," was selected for publication in Arthur Kurzweil's Best Jewish Writing 2003. A singer, cello and guitar player, he composes and performs Jewish music.

Husbands-Hankin has had four assistant or associate rabbis working with him. Shoshana Spergel joined Temple Beth Israel in 1998 as interim rabbi when Husbands-Hankins went on a sabbatical; Jonathan Seidel was assistant rabbi from 2001 to 2003. Maurice Harris, a 2003 graduate of the Reconstructionist Rabbinical College, joined as assistant rabbi in 2003. He is one of the signators of The Open Letter Concerning Religion and Science From American Rabbis, part of the Clergy Letter Project which "encourages and embraces the teaching of evolution in schools". In 2011, Boris Dolin joined the congregation as its newest associate rabbi.

In 2015 Rabbi Husbands-Hankin retired and became Rabbi Emeritus. The congregation became a one-rabbi synagogue and hired Rabbi Ruhi Sophia Motzkin Rubenstein to serve as Rabbi.

=== Attacks by neo-Nazis ===
On March 20, 1994, Chris Lord, an individual associated with the Volksfront and American Front, fired ten rounds with an assault rifle into the temple, damaging the interior. The attacks were prompted by a newspaper article about several members of Eugene's Jewish community, including a lesbian. Community organizations, including a local gay rights group, responded by standing vigil outside the synagogue during Passover services. Lord and an associate were caught and convicted, and Lord was sentenced to four and a half years in prison.

On October 25, 2002, Jacob Laskey, his brother Gabriel Laskey, Gerald Poundstone, Jesse Baker, and one other man, all members of the Volksfront, drove to Beth Israel with the intent of intimidating the congregants. While a service with 80 members attending was taking place, the men threw rocks etched with Nazi swastikas through the synagogue's stained glass windows, then sped off. The men were caught, pleaded guilty, and were convicted. They served sentences ranging from a 6-month work release term and five years probation, to eleven years and three months in federal prison for the ringleader, Jacob Laskey.

=== East 29th Avenue building ===
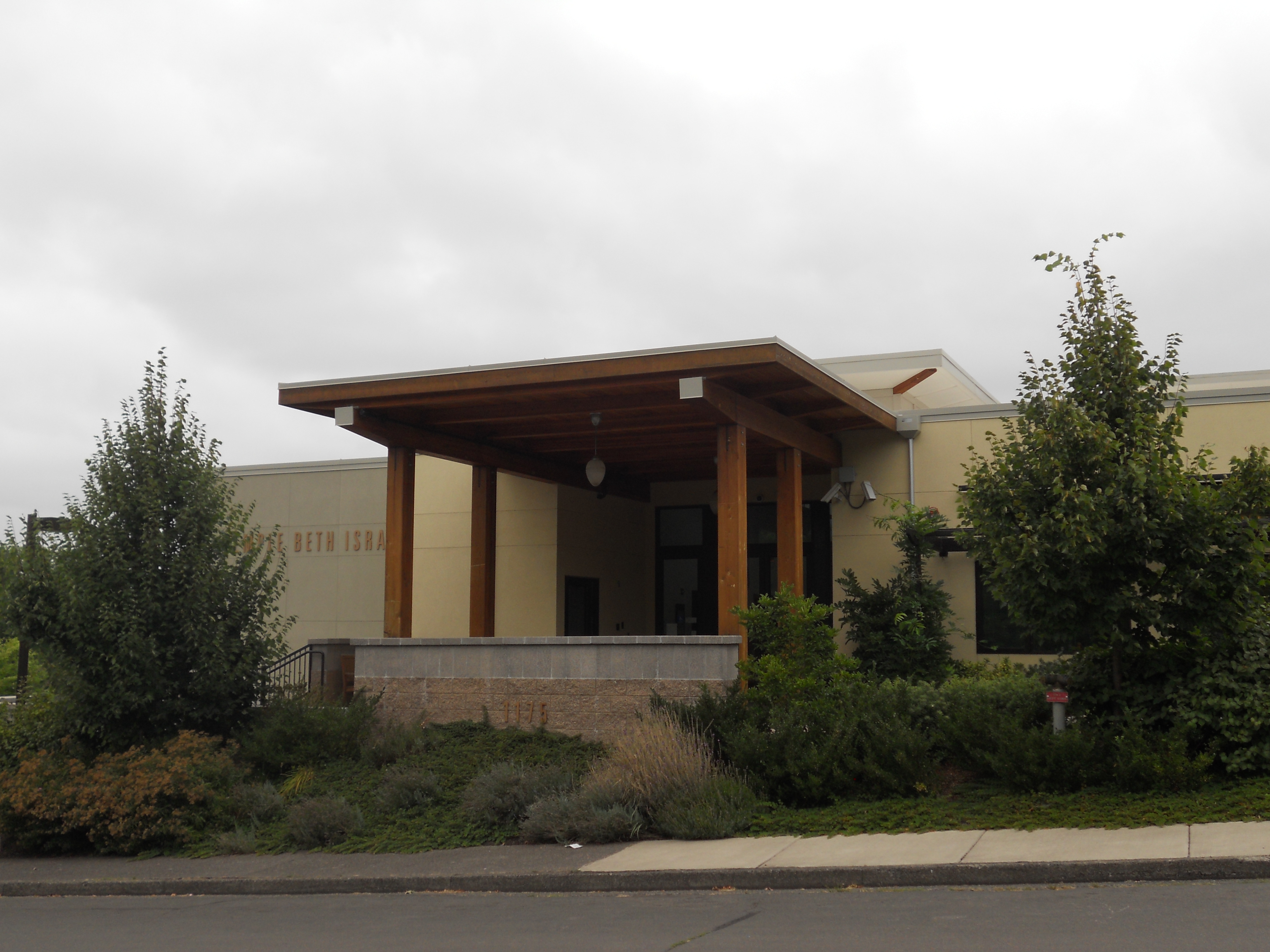
Temple Israel's East 29th Avenue building

Originally sized for 75 families, Temple Beth Israel's Portland Street building had been renovated and enlarged over the years to 7,500 square feet (700 m^{2}) to accommodate 250 families and 150 students. Despite these additions and the loss of members to Congregation Ahavas Torah, the synagogue was not large enough, particularly during the High Holidays, when extra space had to be rented. In 1997 the congregation purchased the property of the University Street Christian Church for $500,000 (today $1,000,000), and began planning for a new facility. The members considered renovating the existing building on the property, but felt a new building would better suit their requirements, and razed the church.

In 2003 the congregation got a permit to begin construction of a new facility on the now-vacant 1.37-acre (0.55 ha) plot of land at the northwest corner of East 29th Avenue and University Street. An initial capital campaign raised more than $1.8 million, which fully paid for the land, and by August 2007 an additional $1.7 million had been raised towards anticipated overall project costs of $5 million.

The environmentally sensitive building was designed by Mel Solomon and Associates of Kansas City and local company TBG Architects & Planners, and built by McKenzie Commercial Construction of Eugene. The building used "energy efficient heating, ventilation and lighting": specific design issues with the building's energy efficiency included the fact that the largest room in the building, the sanctuary, was also the least-used, and, in accord with Jewish tradition, had to face east (towards Jerusalem).

On June 8, 2008, the congregation dedicated its new building at 1175 East 29th Avenue. At approximately 25,000 square feet (2,300 m^{2}), the facility included a sanctuary, commercial kitchen, banquet facilities, and classrooms, and housed the synagogue, the Lane County Jewish Federation, and the local Jewish Family Service. The project ended up costing $6 million, of which $4 million had been raised.

Made of concrete, steel, and wood, the building achieved Leadership in Energy and Environmental Design compliance "through the integration of stormwater management strategies, high efficiency irrigation, the use of recycled and/or recyclable materials, and drought tolerant plantings." Completely recyclable materials used in the structure included carpeting and wood beams.

== Recent events ==
In 2008, Temple Beth Israel participated in Banners Across America, an "interfaith witness against torture coordinated by the National Religious Campaign Against Torture," as part of the Jewish Campaign Against Torture. Organized by Rabbis for Human Rights—North America in honor of Torture Awareness Month, the Jewish campaign included over 25 synagogues which hung banners protesting "the use of abusive interrogation techniques by the American military and intelligence community". That year, congregational membership reached almost 400 families, and the Talmud Torah and pre-school had about 200 and 40 students respectively.

The congregation sold the old synagogue building on Portland Street to Security First (Portland Street) Child Development Center for $815,000 in 2009, carrying the Center's financing. The building was converted for use as an educational center, while retaining some of the original architectural elements. Difficult economic conditions forced the Child Development Center to give up the building in 2011, and Eugene's Network Charter School planned to move into it in autumn 2011.

Harris announced he would be stepping down as rabbi in 2011, and the synagogue hired Boris Dolin as his successor. Born and raised in Oregon, Dolin had worked at Temple Beth Israel as a teacher and youth group adviser from 1999 to 2001. A graduate of the University of Oregon, with a master's degree in Jewish Education from the Jewish Theological Seminary, he was ordained by the Reconstructionist Rabbinical College.

Temple Beth Israel is the largest synagogue in Eugene. It is a member of the Community of Welcoming Congregations, "an Oregon and SW Washington interfaith ministry and advocacy organization working toward full inclusion and equality for transgender, lesbian, bisexual, gay and questioning persons." The Rabbi is Rabbi Ruhi Sophia Motzkin Rubenstein.
