= Antisemitic Exhibition in Zagreb =

Exhibition in Croatia in 1942

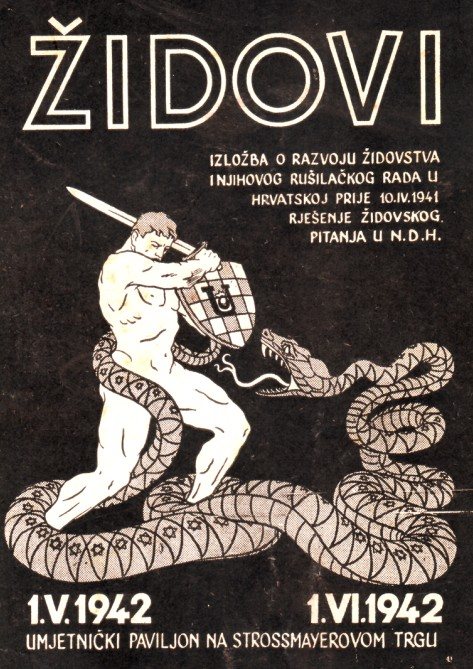
An antisemitic poster used to promote the exhibition.

The Antisemitic Exhibition in Zagreb took place in the Art Pavilion in Zagreb, the capital city of the Independent State of Croatia (NDH), in May 1942.

== History ==
According to its organizers, the exhibition sought to expose the "destructive and exploitative work of Croatia's Jews prior to 1941." Its promotional brochure, produced by Ustaše authorities from the State Investigative and Propaganda Bureau of the NDH (Državni izvještajni i promičbeni ured or DIPU), claimed that most of the displays had been created by "racial experts, demographers, scientists, and ordinary citizens as well as the bureau's investigators." These brochures featured supposed scientific illustrations depicting the alleged Jewish "colonization" of Croatia and the population growth rate of the Jewish community in the country. The brochures also purported that Jews "dominated Croatian commerce in comparison to their share of the population." Although the figures presented lacked serious credibility, the authors reiterated that "rigorous science [was] behind their analysis."

The racist promotional poster used to promote the exhibition featured a nude Aryan warrior fighting a large serpent adorned with Jewish symbols as he carried a sword and shield depicting the Croatian coat of arms. The image sought to portray "the new Ustaša man ... purifying Croatia's body politic of the racially degenerate Jews." The organizers of the exhibition also sought to expose the supposed "economic injustices" and "abuse" suffered by "honest Croatian workers" at the hands of Jews in the Kingdom of Yugoslavia. The exhibition also claimed that Croatian women and girls were being sexually mistreated by Jews. Its promotional film went so far as to suggest that "Jewish pimps [had] picked up vulnerable Croatian women, seducing them and selling them into a sordid life of brothels, prostitution, and white slavery."

The exhibition opened on 1 May 1942. According to Zagreb newspaper Nova Hrvatska report, various state officials attended the opening, including NDH interior minister Andrija Artuković and representatives of the German, Italian and Slovak embassies in Zagreb, as well as the then mayor of Zagreb Ivan Werner. Head of the DIPU Vilko Rieger opened the exhibition with a speech in which he described Jews as detrimental to "the customs and society of Aryan peoples" by being "at the forefront of both exploitative capitalism and marxism" and that history has shown that "healthy nations always fought the Jewish danger". According to the same newspaper's report on 5 May, the exhibition was seen by 8,000 visitors in the first four days. In addition, all visitors received free tickets for cinema screenings of German antisemitic propaganda films Jew Süss, The Rothschilds and The Eternal Jew.

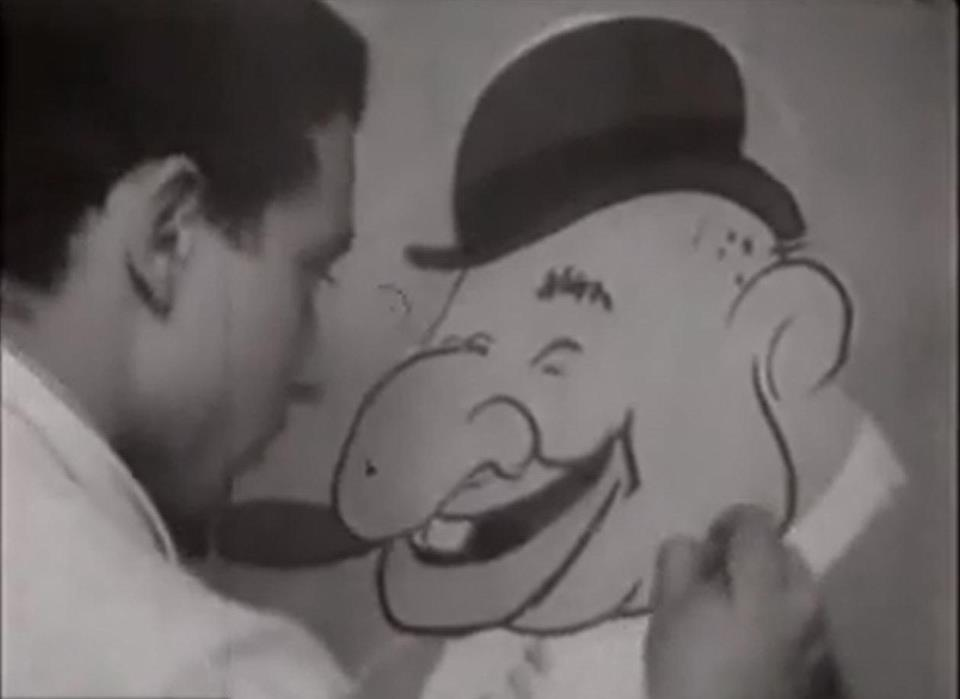
Antisemitic caricature at the exhibition

One of the exhibition authors hired by DIPU was a comic book artist Walter Neugebauer who also appears in an 11-minute documentary film commissioned by DIPU titled How Exhibitions are Created (Kako se stvaraju izložbe) which purports to document the pseudo-scientific and creative efforts in putting together the exhibition. In the film, itself described as "one of the darkest chapters in the history of Croatian cinema", Neugebauer is shown drawing a caricature of a "typical Jew". The exhibition featured displays with text panels showing translated quotes from the Talmud, illustrated art caricatures of Jews, a sculpture of a stereotypical "Jewish" head and maps chronicling Jewish expansion in Croatia and neighbouring countries. The exhibition also featured photographs of the various stages of the demolition of the Zagreb Synagogue (which had been located in the city centre and was destroyed in stages from October 1941 to April 1942).

The exhibition was open to public until 1 June 1942. Afterwards, its displays were exhibited to audiences in Karlovac, Dubrovnik and Sarajevo (6–20 September 1942). Historian Ivo Goldstein and author Rory Yeomans have described it as being the pinnacle of the propaganda campaign spread by the Ustaše against Croatia's Jewish community during World War II.

== See also ==
- Antisemitic Exhibition in Belgrade, opened in October 1941 in Nedić's Serbia.
