= Philipp Rupprecht =

German cartoonist (1900–1975)

Philipp Rupprecht (4 September 1900 – 4 April 1975) was a German cartoonist best known for his antisemitic caricatures in the Nazi publication Der Stürmer, under the pen name Fips.

== Career ==
Born in Nuremberg, Rupprecht immigrated to Argentina in 1920 after World War I, where he worked as a waiter and a cowboy on a cattle ranch. He returned to Nuremberg around 1924 and was hired by the Fränkische Tagespost, a newspaper linked to the German Social Democrats. When he was dispatched to cover the second Luppe-Streicher trial with instructions to draw a caricature of Julius Streicher, he instead drew caricatures of Nuremberg's mayor, Hermann Luppe, who was also involved in the trial. The cartoons were published by Der Stürmer in December 1925, and Rupprecht was hired by the paper.

With the exception of 1927, he was Der Stürmer's sole regular cartoonist under the pen-name of "Fips" until February 2, 1945, when the last edition of Der Stürmer appeared, drawing thousands of antisemitic caricatures. His style changed during the course of his career, but his caricatures always depicted Jews as short, fat, ugly, unshaven, drooling, sexually perverted, bent-nosed, and with pig-like eyes. One depicted a despondent mother smoking while neglecting her child in a lonely rooming house, with a picture of her Jewish seducer on the floor, with the caption: "Everything in her has died. She was ruined by a Jew." The caption "Two kinds of children; two kinds of human beings" juxtaposed dark-haired, overfed, and greedy Jewish women and children by fair-haired children playing with less extravagant toys.

Among his other works were illustrations for two anti-Semitic children's books published by Stürmer Verlag: Trau keinem Fuchs auf grüner Heid und keinem Jud bei seinem Eid ("Don't Trust a Fox in a Green Pasture Or a Jew Upon His Oath", 1936), and Der Giftpilz ("The Poisonous Mushroom", 1938).

At the beginning of World War II, Rupprecht served in the Kriegsmarine, but was released from service because of his value to wartime Nazi propaganda.

== Post-war career ==
Rupprecht's career came to an end with the defeat of the Nazis in World War II. He was put on trial in 1945 and sentenced to ten years of hard labour. On 23 October 1950, he was released from the prison in Eichstätt. Until his death, he lived and worked in Munich and Starnberg as a painter and decorator. He died on 4 April 1975 in Munich, aged 74.

Rupprecht married twice: from 1921 on to Erna Blom (one son and two daughters), and from 1930 to Berta Stöcklein (one son).
