= Antisemitism in the United States =

Antisemitism in the United States describes incidents of hatred, hostility, harm, prejudice or discrimination against people identifying as Jews, religiously, culturally and/or ethnically within the United States of America. It typically includes:

- Attitudes, including those of organized hate groups such as the Ku Klux Klan and Neo-Nazi Organizations, those more widely disseminated in the population;
- Behaviors that can threaten the security of American Jews, as measured by the occurrence of specific incidents, including hate crimes; and
- Discrimination against Jews, threatening their security.

Federal Bureau of Investigation (FBI) data shows that in every year since 1991, Jews were the most frequent targets of religiously motivated hate crimes even though current numbers may be underreported, as is the case for many other targeted groups. As of 2023, the FBI calculated that antisemitic incidents accounted for 68% of all religion-based hate crimes, an increase of 63% since 2022, while the American Jewish Committee (AJC) said that figure was "likely much lower" than the actual number as hate crimes had been "widely underreported across the country." A 2025 survey conducted by the Anti-Defamation League, concluded that "60% of Americans ... at least somewhat agree that antisemitism is a serious problem." Twenty-four percent of Americans, however, maintained that recent antisemitic attacks were understandable.

In the past, incidents of antisemitism were mostly confined to organized antisemitic groups, mainly from a white nationalist or white supremacist backgrounds, but also including the Nation of Islam and some branches of the Black Hebrew Israelites, who have also been identified as antisemitic, reflecting heightened levels of antisemitism among some African-American communities. Over the last decade or more, however, antisemitism has been rising in the U.S., and there has been increasing evidence of antisemitism on both sides of the American political spectrum, as Ambassador Deborah Lipstadt, Special Envoy to Monitor and Combat Antisemitism for the U.S. Department of State highlighted in the title of remarks she gave in 2024: "From Right to Left and In Between: Jew-hatred Across the Political Divide."

In 2024, the Southern Poverty Law Center (SPLC) also summarized their latest findings on the subject in Antisemitism. On the left, they noted an increase in incidents "that began with the Oct. 7, 2023, attacks that initiated the Israel—Hamas war. These incidents included vandalism of Jewish institutions and places of worship, flyering from known hate groups, and assaults on Jewish people and business." On the right, they found that "Hate groups and other bigoted actors have perpetuated the antisemitic narrative that Jewish people are helping to further the normalization and acceptance of LGBTQ+ identities in order to further social strife." Likewise, the far right argues that Jews are orchestrating a "great replacement" in which they aid the immigration of non-white people — especially those who are Muslim — into majority-white counties to challenge and erode white supremacy."

There have been a range of approaches to combating antisemitism, both by government when the Biden administration launched the U.S. National Strategy to Counter Antisemitism and by Jewish communities whose tactics have included the creation of more holocaust museums. Nonetheless, incidents of antisemitism continue to rise in the U.S. and worldwide. One result, according to Gallop, is "most Jewish Americans have felt reluctant to share their religious affiliation."

== Causes ==
=== Economic crises ===
Historically, antisemitic attitudes and rhetoric have tended to increase whenever the United States has faced a serious economic crisis, as well as during moments of political and social uncertainty and fear, such as with the rise of nativist anti-immigration organizing in the early twentieth century, the emergence of the Nazi-affiliated German-American Bund in the 1930s, and the anti-Communist political movement during McCarthyism, also known as the Red Scare.

=== Conspiracy theories ===
American antisemites have viewed the fraudulent text The Protocols of the Elders of Zion as a real reference to a supposed Jewish cabal which was out to subvert and ultimately destroy the U.S. Both the association of Jews with Communism and the fixation on a Jewish cabal purported in The Protocols of the Elders of Zion are conspiracies transplanted to the American context from European modernity: in a moment of economic revolution and socialist politics rising in contexts across Europe, conservative leaders from Christian Russia to interwar Great Britain manipulated a public fear of Jewish Bolshevism to scapegoat Jewish populations for strategic political gain.

Academic David Greenberg has written in Slate, "Extreme anti-communism always contained an antisemitic component: Radical, alien Jews, in their demonology, orchestrated the Communist conspiracy." He also has argued that, in the years which followed World War II, some groups on "the American right remained closely tied to the unvarnished Antisemites of the '30s who railed against the "Jew Deal", a bigoted term which was used against the New Deal measures of President Franklin D. Roosevelt.

The "Great Replacement" theme, a version of the broader white genocide conspiracy theory, was stressed by people who highlighted the supposed threat of Jews and other immigrants replacing Americans who were born in the country. In the 1920s and 1930s, antisemitic activists were led by Henry Ford and other figures like Charles Lindbergh, William Dudley Pelley, Charles Coughlin and Gerald L. K. Smith, and some of them were also members of organizations like the America First Committee, the Christian Nationalist Crusade, the German American Bund, the Ku Klux Klan and the Silver Legion of America. They promulgated canards and various interrelated conspiracy theories that widely spread the fear that, through an evil transnational network, Jews were working for the destruction or replacement of white Americans along with the fear that Jews were working for the destruction or replacement of Christianity in the United States.

=== Holocaust denial ===
Austin App (1902–1984), a German-American La Salle University professor of medieval English literature, is considered the first major American Holocaust denier. App wrote extensively in newspapers and periodicals, and he also wrote a couple of books which detailed his defense of Nazi Germany and Holocaust denial. App's work inspired the Institute for Historical Review, a California center which was founded in 1978 with the sole purpose of denying the Holocaust. One of the newer forms of antisemitism is the denial of the Holocaust by negationist historians and neo-Nazis.

The results of a survey which was conducted in 2020 revealed that close to two-thirds of Millennials and Gen Z adults were not aware that 6 million Jews were killed in the Holocaust. 24% of them believed that the Holocaust might be a myth or that accounts of it are exaggerated.

=== Tropes and stereotypes ===
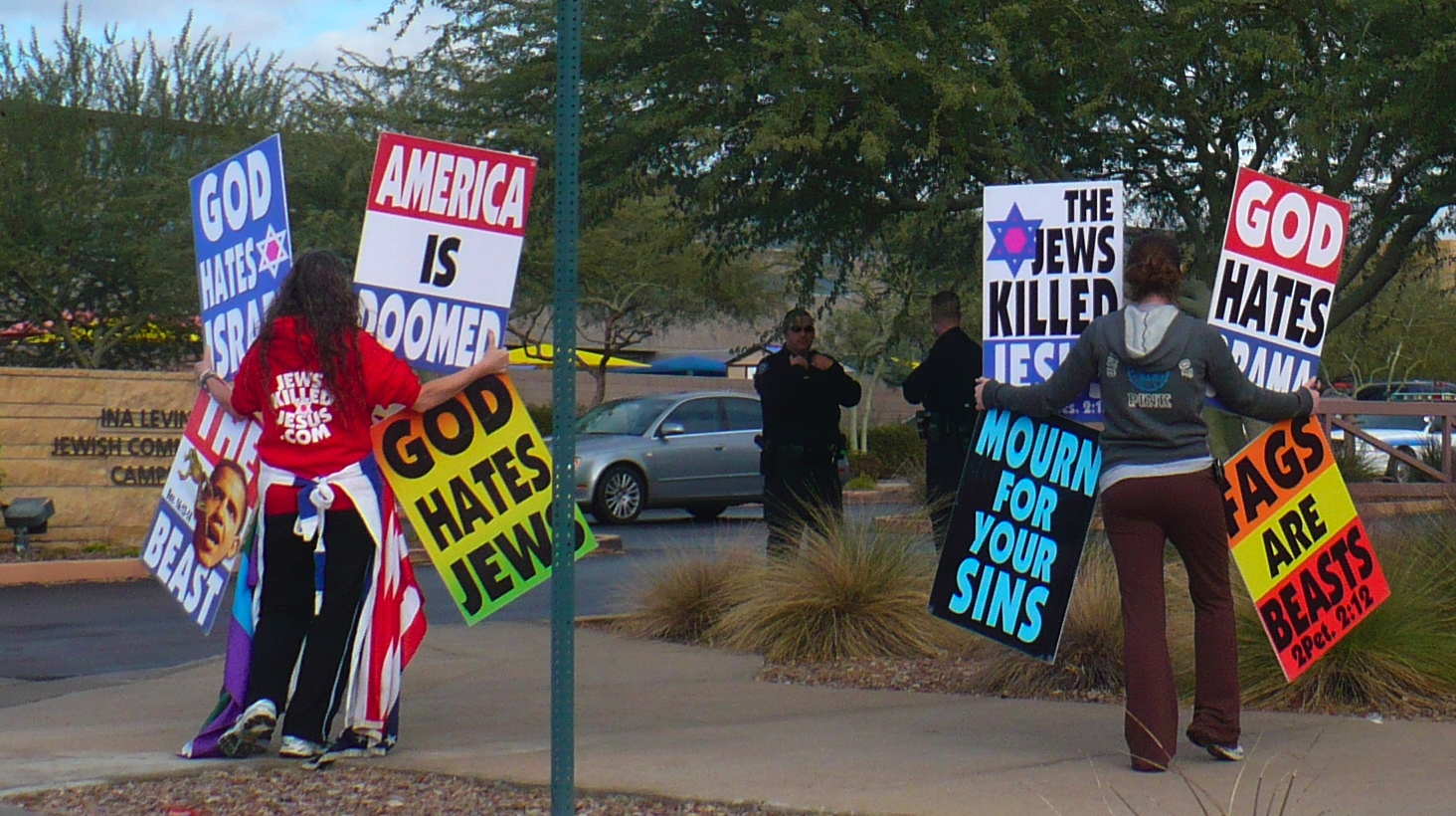
A protest against Jews, held by the Westboro Baptist Church

The most persistent form of antisemitism has consisted of a series of widely circulating tropes and stereotypes in which Jews are portrayed as being socially, religiously, and economically unacceptable to the American way of life, because of their inferiority to white Christian society or because of conspiratorial thinking in which Jews are accused of plotting to undermine the racial and economic hierarchies which make up the historical fabric of American society. As a whole, the Jewish people were looked down upon. They were made to feel unwanted, they were marginalized by American society and they were considered a menace to the United States.

Martin Marger wrote, "A set of distinct and consistent negative stereotypes, some of which can be traced as far back as the Middle Ages in Europe, has been applied to Jews." David Schneder wrote, "Three large clusters of traits are part of the Jewish stereotype (Wuthnow, 1982). First, [American] Jews are seen as being powerful and manipulative. Second, they are accused of dividing their loyalties between the United States and Israel. A third set of traits concerns Jewish materialistic values, aggressiveness, clannishness."

Stereotypes of Jewish people share some of the same content as stereotypes of Asians: perceived disloyalty, power, intelligence, and dishonesty overlap. The similarity between the content of stereotypes of Jews and the content of stereotypes of Asians may stem from the fact that many immigrant Jews and many immigrant Asians both developed a merchant role, a role which was also historically held by many Indians in East Africa, where the content of stereotypes of them resembles the content of stereotypes of Asians and Jews in the United States.

Some of the antisemitic tropes which have been cited by the Anti-Defamation League (ADL) in its studies of U.S. social trends include the claims that "Jews have too much power in the business world," "Jews are more willing to use shady practices to get what they want," and "Jews always like to be at the head of things." Another issue that garners attention is the assertion that Jews have an excessive amount of influence on American cinema and news media. Put together, these lines of thinking about Jews demonstrate a common trend in the history of both American and global antisemitism—the inflation of stereotypes of Jews into a theory about how power (politics, economics, media, etc.) functions in society, an irrational theory that deflects responsibility for social ills away from actual authorities and leaders and onto minority Jewish communities.

In contemporary alt-right and right-wing circles, these tropes of power-hungry Jews sometimes manifest through coded references to "globalists," accusations that liberal agendas are the sole product of prominent Jews, and conspiracy theories (such as QAnon) that can be linked to the medieval blood libel against Jews.

== Statistics on antisemitism ==
Polls and studies point to a steady decrease in Antisemitic attitudes, beliefs, and manifestations among the American public. A 1992 survey by the Anti-Defamation League (ADL) showed that about 20% of Americans—between 30 and 40 million adults—held Antisemitic views, a considerable decline from the total of 29% found in 1964. However, another survey by the same organization concerning antisemitic incidents showed that the curve has risen without interruption since 1986.

=== 2005 survey ===
The number of Americans holding antisemitic views declined markedly six years later when another ADL study classified only 12 percent of the population—between 20 and 25 million adults, as "most antisemitic." Confirming the findings of previous surveys, both studies also found that African Americans were significantly more likely than whites to hold Antisemitic views, with 34 percent of blacks classified as "most Antisemitic," compared to 9 percent of whites in 1998. The 2005 Survey of American Attitudes Towards Jews in America, a national poll of 1,600 American adults conducted in March 2005, found that 14% of Americans—or nearly 35 million adults—hold views about Jews that are "unquestionably Antisemitic," compared to 17% in 2002, In 1998, the number of Americans with hardcore Antisemitic beliefs had dropped to 12% from 20% in 1992.

The 2005 survey found "35 percent of foreign-born Hispanics (down from 44% [in 2002])" and 36 percent of African-Americans hold strong Antisemitic beliefs, four times more than the 9 percent for whites." The 2005 Anti-Defamation League survey includes data on Hispanic attitudes, with 29% being most Antisemitic (as opposed as 9% for whites and 36% for blacks), being born in the United States lessened the prevalence of that attitude: 35% of foreign-born Hispanics and only 19% of those born in the US.

The survey findings come at a time of increased Antisemitic activity in America. The 2004 ADL Audit of Antisemitic Incidents reported that Antisemitic incidents reached their highest level in nine years. A total of 1,821 Antisemitic incidents were reported in 2004, an increase of 17% over the 1,557 incidents reported during 2003. "What concerns us is that many of the gains we had seen in building a more tolerant and accepting America seem not to have taken hold as firmly as we had hoped," said Abraham H. Foxman, ADL National Director. "While there are many factors at play, the findings suggest that Antisemitic beliefs endure and resonate with a substantial segment of the population, nearly 35 million people."

=== Other surveys ===
A 2004 poll conducted by Gallup concluded that Americans were more concerned about antisemitism at that time than they were twenty years before, and that American Jews are much more likely to have experienced and report mistreatment as a result of being Jewish than other groups. In 2013, or almost a decade later, the Anti-Defamation League (ADL) reported a multi-year slide in antisemitism, including a 19% decline in 2013.

In 2007 an ABC News report recounted that past ABC polls across several years have tended to find that about 6% of Americans self-report prejudice against Jews as compared to about 25% being against Arab Americans and about 10% against Hispanic Americans. The report also remarked that a full 34% of Americans reported having "some racist feelings" in general as a self-description.

A 2009 study which was titled "Modern Anti-Semitism and Anti-Israeli Attitudes", published in the Journal of Personality and Social Psychology in 2009, tested a new theoretical model of antisemitism among Americans in the Greater New York area with three experiments. The research team's theoretical model proposed that mortality salience (reminding people that they will someday die) increases antisemitism and that antisemitism is often expressed as anti-Israel attitudes. The first experiment showed that mortality salience led to higher levels of antisemitism and lower levels of support for Israel. The study's methodology was designed to tease out antisemitic attitudes that are concealed by polite people. The second experiment showed that mortality salience caused people to perceive Israel as very important, but did not cause them to perceive any other country this way. The third experiment showed that mortality salience led to a desire to punish Israel for human rights violations but not to a desire to punish Russia or India for identical human rights violations. According to the researchers, their results "suggest that Jews constitute a unique cultural threat to many people's worldviews, that antisemitism causes hostility to Israel, and that hostility to Israel may feed back to increase antisemitism." Furthermore, "those claiming that there is no connection between antisemitism and hostility toward Israel are wrong."

The 2011 Survey of American Attitudes Toward Jews in America released by the ADL found that the recent world economic recession increased some antisemitic viewpoints among Americans. Abraham H. Foxman, the organization's national director, argued, "It is disturbing that with all of the strides we have made in becoming a more tolerant society, antisemitic beliefs continue to hold a vice-grip on a small but not insubstantial segment of the American public." Specifically, the polling found that 19% of Americans answered "probably true" to the assertion that "Jews have too much control/influence on Wall Street" while 15% concurred with the related statement that Jews seem "more willing to use shady practices" in business. Nonetheless, the survey generally reported positive attitudes for most Americans, the majority of those who were surveyed expressed philo-Semitic sentiments such as 64% agreeing that Jews have contributed much to U.S. social culture.

In 2014, the Federal Bureau of Investigation's (FBI) Uniform Crime Report (UCR), which relied on 15,494 law enforcement agencies for their analysis, recorded 1,140 victims of anti-religious hate crimes, of which 56.8% were motivated by the anti-Jewish biases of offenders. The New York Times reported that Jews were the most targeted in proportion to their population size in 2005, and they were the second-most targeted individuals after LGBT individuals in 2014. Between 2016 and 2018, the NYPD reported a 75% increase in the amount of swastika graffiti, with an uptick observed after the Pittsburgh shooting. In 2018, out of 189 hate crimes in New York City 150 featured swastikas.

In 2018 and 2019, FBI and ADL statistics recorded further increases in violent antisemitic attacks and cases of harassment. The ADL reported that antisemitism in the U.S. had reached "near‑historic levels," with 1,879 attacks recorded against individuals and institutions during 2018, "the third‑highest year on record since the ADL started tracking such data in the 1970s."

A 2026 survey found that 57% of American Jews reported experiencing antisemitism in the past year. The survey of 1,060 adults, conducted by Ira Sheskin of the University of Miami for the Combat Antisemitism Movement, found that 46% of Orthodox Jews and 44% of those active in Jewish communal life personally felt antisemitism, compared with 17% of those not involved. The survey also found that 38% of all respondents said they now hide things that identify them as Jewish, 32% have avoided posting anything online that would identify them as Jewish, and 23% said they had skipped Jewish events or observances out of fear. The National Opinion Research Center at the University of Chicago administered the survey.

A 2026 American Jewish Committee survey found that 77% of the respondents experienced or witnessed antisemitism since October 7, 2023. 56% of respondents said they are concerned for their safety and noted changes in their behavior, fearing antisemitism.

=== Within the African-American community ===
Surveys which were conducted by the ADL in 2007, 2009, 2011, and 2013 all found that an overwhelming majority of African-Americans who were questioned rejected antisemitism and they generally expressed the same kinds of tolerant viewpoints as other Americans who were also surveyed. For example, the results of the ADL's 2009 study revealed that 28% of African-Americans who were surveyed expressed antisemitic views while a 72% majority did not. However, those three surveys all revealed that negative attitudes towards Jews were stronger among African-Americans than they were among the general population at large.

According to earlier ADL research, dating back to 1964, the trend that African-Americans are significantly more likely to hold antisemitic beliefs across all education levels than white Americans has remained unchanged over the years. Nonetheless, the percentage of the population which holds a negative opinion of Jews has also waned considerably in the black community during this period. In 1967, the New York Times Magazine published the article "Negroes Are Anti-Semitic Because They're Anti-White" in which the African-American author James Baldwin sought to explain the prevalence of black antisemitism. An ADL poll from 1992 stated that 37% of African-Americans surveyed displayed antisemitism; in contrast, a poll from 2011 found that only 29% did so.

The more education people have the less antisemitic they are. In 1998 among blacks with no college education, 43% fell into the most antisemitic group (versus 18% of the general population) compared to only 27% among blacks with some college education and just 18% among blacks with a four-year college degree (versus 5% of people in the general population with a four-year college degree). At all educational levels, Blacks were more likely than whites to accept anti-Jewish stereotypes.

Brookings Institution fellow Jamie Kirchick said in 2018 that antisemitism has been a particular problem in parts of America's black community since the split between the mainstream Civil rights movement led by Martin Luther King Jr. and the more radical Black Power movement of the late 1960s.

A 2019 study found that 28% of African Americans believed that they were seeing more Black people that they personally knew express antisemitism than in the past. In the same study, 19% of African Americans believed that Jewish people were impeding Black progress in America. Four percent (4%) of African Americans self-identified as being Black Hebrew Israelites in 2019.

== Manifestations ==
=== White nationalists and white supremacists ===
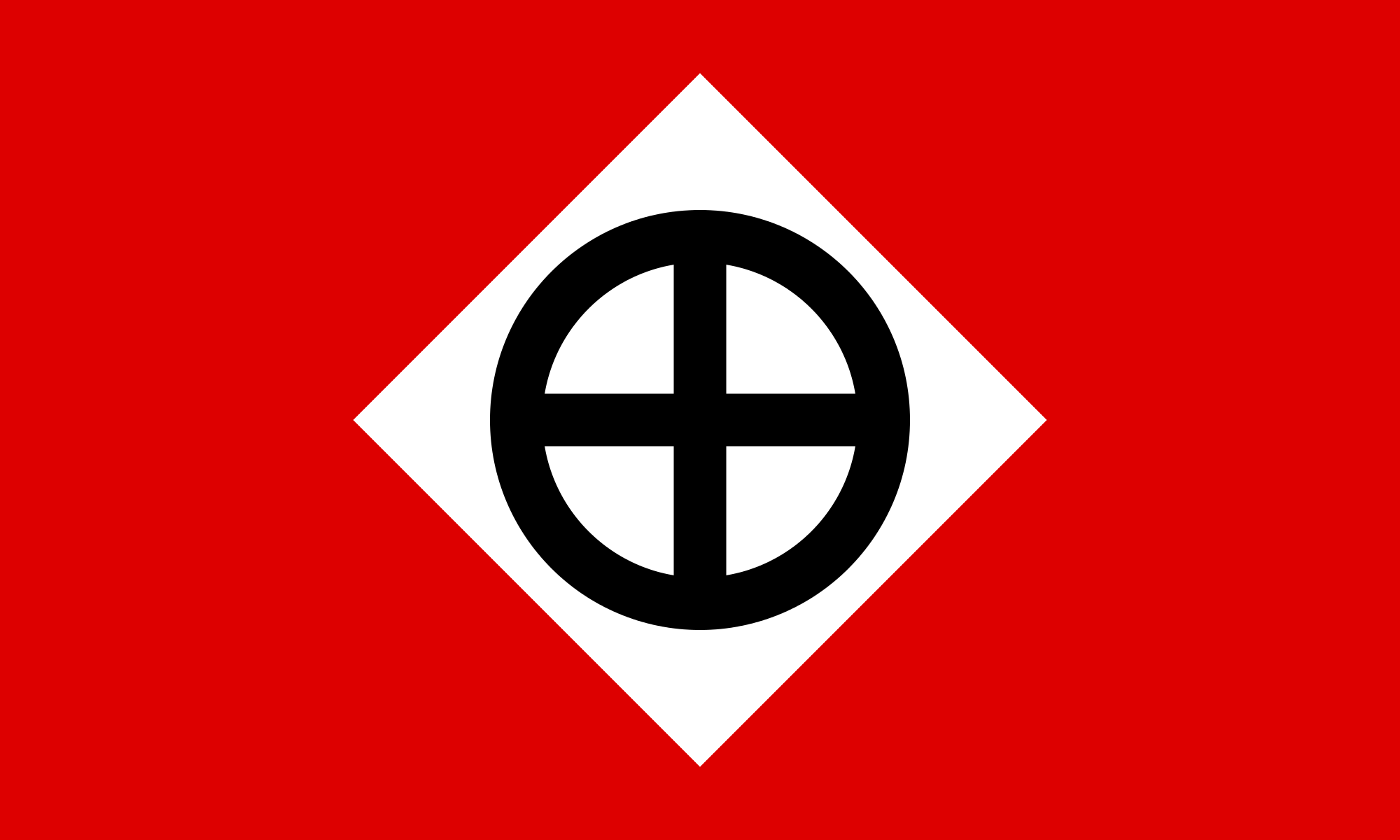
The flag of the Knights Party, the political branch of the Knights of the Ku Klux Klan

There are a number of antisemitic organizations in the United States, some of them violent, which espouse religious antisemitism, racial antisemitism, white nationalism and white supremacy. They include Christian Identity Churches, White Aryan Resistance, the Ku Klux Klan, the American Nazi Party, and many other organizations. Several fundamentalist churches, such as the Westboro Baptist Church and the Faithful Word Baptist Church, also preach antisemitic messages. The largest neo-Nazi organizations in the United States are the National Nazi Party and the National Socialist Movement. Adopting the look and emblems of white power skinheads, many members of these antisemitic groups shave their heads and tattoo themselves with Nazi symbols such as swastikas, SS insignias, and "Heil Hitler". Additionally, antisemitic groups march and preach antisemitic messages throughout America. Although most American Jews are of European descent and 80% to 90% of them identify as white (as noted by Ilana Kaufman of the Jewish Community Relations Council), white nationalists hate the religious and ethnic diversity that Jews represent.

=== Nation of Islam ===
A number of Jewish, Christian, and Muslim organizations, and academics consider the Nation of Islam to be antisemitic. Specifically, they claim that the Nation of Islam has engaged in revisionist and antisemitic interpretations of the Holocaust and exaggerates the role of Jews in the Atlantic slave trade.

In December 2012, the Simon Wiesenthal Center put the NOI's leader Louis Farrakhan on its list of the ten most prominent antisemites in the world. He was the only American to make it onto the list. The organization cited statements that he had made in October of that year in which he claimed that "Jews control the media" and "Jews are the most violent of people."

Farrakhan has denied charges of antisemitism, but in his denial, he included a reference to "Satanic Jews" and in another speech referred to Jews as termites. After he was banned from Facebook, he denied being a "hater" but admitted that Facebook's designation of him as a "dangerous individual" was correct.

=== Changes over time ===
In a 2025 article entitled “Not Your Bubbe’s Antisemitism,” long-term observer of American Jewish life, legal scholar Michael H. Traison distinguished present-day manifestations of hostility to Jews with the bigotry that existed when he grew up, noting:

Older Jews remember college quotas; ‘restricted’ country clubs and resorts; exclusionary real estate covenants; and job discrimination. However, the genteel bigotry portrayed in the Academy Award-winning Gentleman's Agreement—the 1947 film based on Laura Z. Hobson’s bestselling novel in which the "tall, dark, and handsome" Gregory Peck portrays a Christian journalist who pretends to be Jewish to expose such prejudice—is something entirely out of touch with present-day reality. That version of antisemitism was palpable and ever present—but since then, America has undergone a civil rights revolution and a sweeping demographic transformation that has substantially changed the dynamics. As a result, we are living in vastly different times and in an entirely changed social and political landscape. Long gone are the days when Jews were barred from buying homes in affluent suburbs or joining "exclusive" country clubs. Jews are no longer shut out of the advertising industry or top law firms, as once was the case.

== Notable incidents ==
1. Private residence (22.0%)
2. College campus (7.00%)
3. Jewish institution / school (11.0%)
4. Non-Jewish school (12.0%)
5. Public area (35.0%)
6. Private building / area (12.0%)
7. Cemetery (1.00%)

=== 2013 Knockout game attacks ===
During the knockout game spate of violent assaults, in 2013, ABC Nightline reported that New York City police believed that antisemitism was likely to be a motive in the attacks, as all eight victims were identified as Jewish.

=== 2019 Synagogue attacks ===
During Hanukkah festivities in December 2019, a number of attacks committed in New York were possibly motivated by antisemitism, including a mass stabbing in Monsey.

=== 2018 Pittsburgh synagogue shooting ===
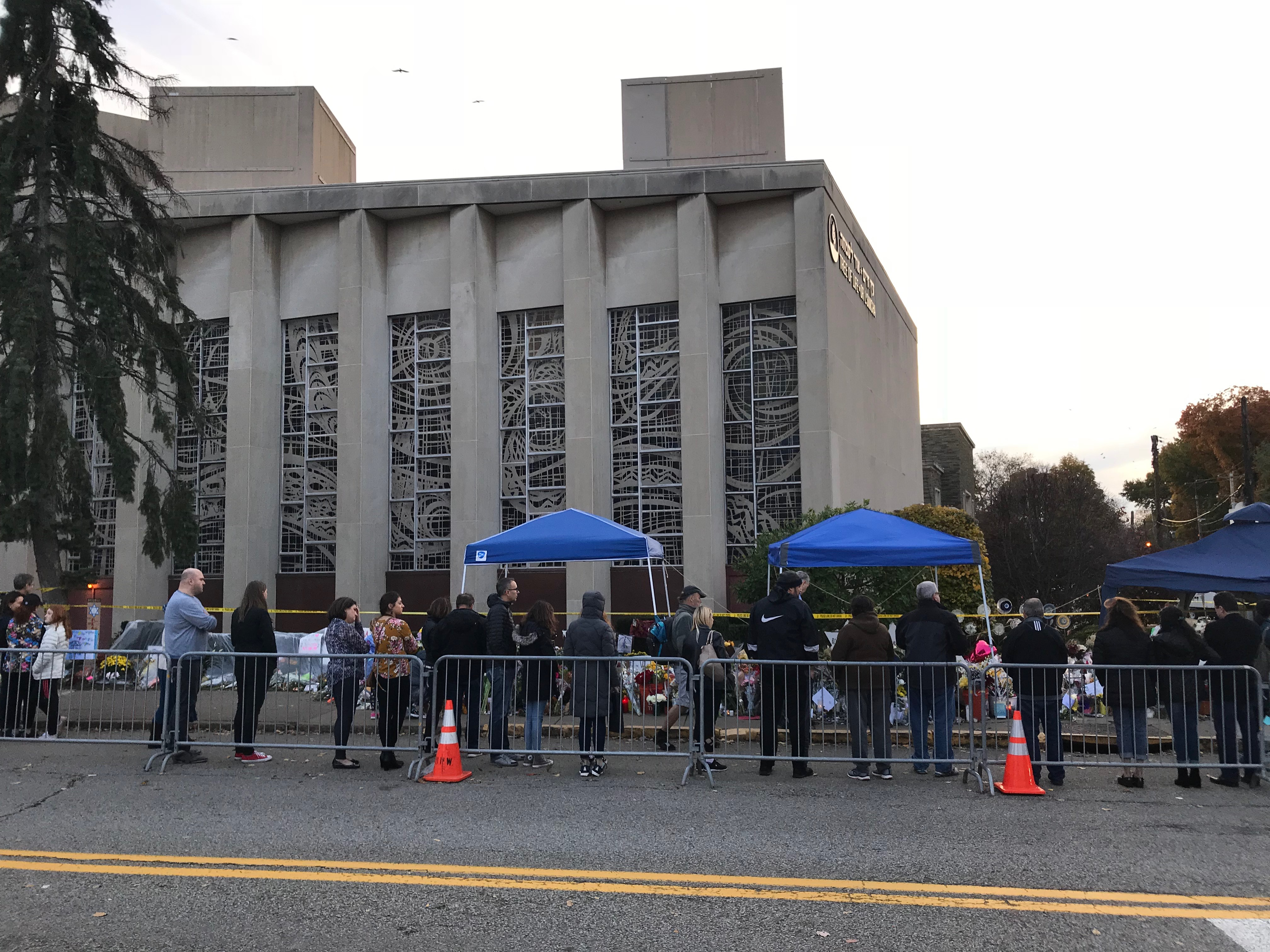
People paying their respects at a memorial to the victims of the Tree of Life synagogue

The Pittsburgh synagogue shooting was a terrorist attack in the form of a mass shooting, which took place at the Tree of Life – Or L'Simcha Congregation synagogue in the Squirrel Hill neighborhood of Pittsburgh. The congregation, along with New Light Congregation and Congregation Dor Hadash, which also worshipped in the building, was attacked during Shabbat morning services on October 27, 2018. The perpetrator killed eleven people and wounded six. It was the deadliest attack ever on the Jewish community in the United States. A lone suspect, identified as 46-year-old Robert Gregory Bowers, was arrested at the scene. In 2023, he was tried in federal court and sentenced to death.

=== 2019 Poway synagogue shooting ===
The Poway synagogue shooting occurred on April 27, 2019, at Chabad of Poway synagogue in Poway, California. It came on the last day of the Jewish Passover holiday, which fell on a Shabbat. Armed with an AR-15–style rifle, the gunman, John Earnest, a White supremacist and Christian traditionalist, fatally shot one woman and injured three other persons, including the synagogue's rabbi. A month before the shooting, Earnest had attempted to burn down a mosque in Escondido. In September 2021, Earnest was sentenced by a state court to life in prison without the possibility of parole.

=== 2019 Jersey City shooting ===
On December 10, 2019, a shooting took place at a kosher grocery store in the Greenville section of Jersey City, New Jersey. Three people were killed at the store by two perpetrators, David N. Anderson and Francine Graham. The assailants also wounded one customer and two police officers before being killed by police during an ensuing shootout. A Jersey City Police Department detective had also been shot and killed by the assailants at a nearby cemetery just before the grocery store attack.

Anderson, who identified as a Black Hebrew Israelite, had a history of posting antisemitic and anti-law enforcement messages on social media; Attorney General of New Jersey Gurbir Grewal stated that evidence indicated that the attacks were acts of hate and domestic terrorism which were fueled by antisemitism and anti-police sentiment. Authorities believe that a much larger attack had been planned, but it was thwarted by the police detective's intervention at the cemetery. The shooting was part of a wave of violent attacks against Jews in the United States.

2019 saw a spate of attacks in which pedestrians wearing identifiably Jewish clothing were assaulted, beaten and often knocked to the ground by an assailant or group of assailants, many of whom shouted antisemitic slurs. The assailants were black and Hispanic. One assailant, Tiffany Harris, who was released without bail after attacking a Jewish woman, attacked three other Jewish women the very next day; all of the victims were dressed in distinctively Jewish clothing. Although the Williamsburg and Crown Heights neighborhoods of Brooklyn where most of the assaults have taken place are experiencing gentrification, no similar assaults have been reported on the gentrifiers, although their clothing makes them easy to identify.

In May 2021, there was an upsurge of violent assaults on Jews in the United States at the same time as the Gaza conflict, according to the Secure Community Network and Network Contagion Research Institute.

=== 2021 Maugham Elementary School: Adolf Hitler assignment controversy ===
In early April 2021, a fifth-grade teacher at Maugham Elementary School, a public grammar school in Tenafly, New Jersey, instructed a 5th grade student to dress up as Adolf Hitler and write a first-person essay from the perspective of the Nazi leader touting his "accomplishments" as a part of a class assignment. The student wrote a biography of Hitler that glorified the Nazi leader, stated that Hitler's "greatest accomplishment was uniting a great mass of German and Austrian people" in his support, framed the Holocaust in a positive light, and added that Hitler was "pretty great". The student's essay was displayed publicly within the school's hallway during the month of April. In May 2021, the details of the school assignment became known to the public, leading to outrage in the community, which has a substantial Jewish population. After initially defending the teacher and the school's actions and asserting that "it is unfair to judge any student or teacher in this matter", the board of Tenafly Public Schools suspended the teacher and the principal of the school with pay in June 2021 and opened an investigation into the incident. Following the investigation, the teacher resigned and the principal was reinstated.

=== 2023 Los Angeles shooting ===
In February 2023, 28-year-old Jaime Tran shot two Jewish men when they were leaving religious services at two separate synagogues in the same predominantly Jewish neighborhood of Los Angeles, California. According to the police, the victims were carried to a hospital in stable condition. Tran was arrested by police and admitted he shot the men for being Jewish. Tran, who often posted far-right antisemitic content online, may be sentenced to life in prison.

=== 2023 New Jersey arson attacks ===
In June 2023, four Jewish homes were set on fire, one of which was destroyed completely, and fourteen others were sprayed with antisemitic graffiti including swastikas and other Neo‑Nazi and white supremacist symbols in Toms River, New Jersey. A Hispanic family was targeted too. The perpetrator of these attacks, Ronald "Ron" Carr, 35, from nearby Manchester, told the police that he acted to "save the neighborhood" from Jews, who "are ruining the world" and "should be a dying breed". He was sentenced to seven years in prison.

=== During the Gaza War ===
In January 2024, the Anti-Defamation League (ADL) published a press release citing over 3,000 antisemitic incidents in the US and claiming a 360% increase in antisemitic incidents in the US in the period after the October 7 attacks. The ADL's CEO, Jonathan Greenblatt, who has stated that anti-Zionism is antisemitism, claimed that "the American Jewish community is facing a threat level that's now unprecedented in modern history." The ADL's assessment of the increase in antisemitic incidents has been criticized for conflating criticism of Israel with antisemitism. The Nation reported that "many of the cited 'incidents' were actions directed against Israel to protest the conduct of its war in Gaza—incidents the ADL would later admit made up nearly half of the total." These incidents included protests by groups such as Students for Justice in Palestine. According to The Forward, two out of three of the incidents cited by the ADL were tied to Israel, and that "overall, a large share of the incidents appear to be expressions of hostility toward Israel, rather than the traditional forms of antisemitism that the organization [ADL] had focused on in previous years." Supporters of Israel have criticized statements about Israel's genocide of the Palestinians in Gaza and described them as a kind of "blood libel".

The distinction between antisemitism—hostility, prejudice, or discrimination against Jews—and anti-Zionism—opposition to Zionism—has been a matter of debate in the US. Pro-Israel organizations such as the Anti-Defamation League, Canary Mission, and Betar have blurred the distinction and have characterized protests against the war and genocide as antisemitic. Critics of these characterizations—including scholars, journalists, and activists—have described them as exploiting the accusation of antisemitism to silence criticism of Israel. During the Gaza war, various institutions have adopted definitions of antisemitism, such as the IHRA definition, that critics say conflate anti-Zionism or criticism of Israel with antisemitism.

According to The Jerusalem Post, antisemitic hate crimes accounted for almost half of the total hate crimes committed in New York State in 2023.

According to a report published by Florida Attorney-General Ashley Moody, the number of antisemitic crimes in Florida increased by 94% in 2023 compared to 2022. These crimes occurred on campuses, in places of worship, and in other areas. Moody also called to action: "To protect Jewish Americans, we took action—calling for a zero-tolerance policy for hate crimes and urging Florida college and university police chiefs to protect Jewish students and other religious groups."

According to the Massachusetts Executive Office of Public Safety and Security's Hate Crimes in Massachusetts 2023 report, the number of antisemitic crimes in Florida increased by 70% in 2023 compared to 2022.

A September 2024 survey showed that 3.5 million adult American Jews—about one third of American Jews—experienced some form of antisemitism in the year following the October 7 attacks.

According to a 2025 report by Tel Aviv University, several major U.S. cities recorded an increase in antisemitic hate crimes in 2024 compared to previous years. New York City, home to the largest Jewish population in the country, reported 344 incidents, up from 325 in 2023 and 264 in 2022. Similarly, Chicago saw an increase to 79 incidents in 2024, compared to 50 in 2023 and 39 in 2022. Austin reported a rise to 15 cases in 2024, from six in 2023 and four in 2022, while Denver experienced a sharp increase to 31 cases in 2024 from nine the previous year.

Incidents of antisemitism by U.S. State, 2022-2024 (includes harassment, vandalism and assault)
State	2022	2023	2024	Per 100,000 residents
Alabama	28	56	67	1.30
Alaska	3	13	7	0.95
Arizona	53	163	122	1.61
Arkansas	7	25	23	0.74
California	518	1266	1344	3.41
Colorado	71	198	279	4.68
Connecticut	68	184	159	4.33
Delaware	11	17	11	1.05
Florida	269	463	353	1.51
Georgia	80	172	163	1.46
Hawaii	5	16	22	1.52
Idaho	8	22	20	1.00
Illinois	121	211	336	2.64
Indiana	33	59	142	2.05
Iowa	14	17	23	0.71
Kansas	9	20	20	0.67
Kentucky	16	47	58	1.26
Louisiana	14	64	65	1.41
Maine	13	53	51	3.63
Maryland	109	339	356	5.68
Massachusetts	152	440	438	6.14
Michigan	111	267	252	2.49
Minnesota	53	93	134	2.31
Mississippi	7	9	20	0.68
Missouri	30	125	105	1.68
Montana	14	21	20	1.76
Nebraska	14	44	33	1.65
Nevada	30	82	74	2.26
New Hampshire	14	35	53	3.76
New Jersey	409	830	719	7.57
New Mexico	8	31	47	2.21
New York	580	1218	1437	7.23
North Carolina	39	151	175	1.58
North Dakota	6	7	7	0.88
Ohio	61	237	233	1.96
Oklahoma	11	65	30	0.73
Oregon	40	124	138	3.23
Pennsylvania	114	394	465	3.56
Rhode Island	19	52	52	4.67
South Carolina	44	85	35	0.64
South Dakota	3	17	22	2.38
Tennessee	40	90	81	1.12
Texas	211	256	251	0.80
Utah	11	47	41	1.17
Vermont	6	43	44	6.78
Virginia	69	223	266	3.02
Washington	65	190	239	1.90
Washington DC	37	171	151	23.20
West Virginia	3	15	12	0.68
Wisconsin	45	93	128	2.15
Wyoming	2	13	31	5.28
Total	3698	8873	9354	

In August 2024, the U.S. Department of Homeland Security announced that it had allocated $454.5 million for the 2024 fiscal year to securing Jewish religious institutions in light of rising antisemitism. This is a $150 million increase from the 2023 budget.

Also in August 2024, AIPAC's headquarters in Washington, D.C. were vandalized by anti‑Israel activists. This happened around the same time as swastikas were graffitied throughout a NYC neighborhood, and four Maryland schools were vandalized with anti‑Israel and antisemitic graffiti. New York Police Department reported 19 antisemitic incidents in New York City in August 2024 alone, with a total of 117 incidents between January and the end of September 2024, a 74% increase from the same period the previous year. In September 2024, the FBI reported that there was a 63% increase in antisemitic incidents in the U.S. in 2023 from the previous year, for a total of an all-time high of 1,832 recorded incidents.

Antisemitism has also been reported during the 2024 and 2025 pro-Palestinian protests on university campuses, and in various public school districts.

In October 2024, in the aftermath of Hurricane Helene, complaints which contained antisemitic rhetoric were posted online and FEMA officials were threatened with violence. Many were disturbed at the speed at which these false claims were spread.

According to the FBI’s annual Hate Crime Report, published in August 2025, the year 2024 recorded a new high in antisemitic incidents in the United States, with a total of 1,938 antisemitic hate crimes. The report further noted that, although Jews constitute only 2% of the U.S. population, they were the target of 69% of all religion-based hate crimes.

In June, the Justice Department announced that it filed a lawsuit against the owners of the Jerusalem Coffee House in Oakland, California. The lawsuit alleges that the defendants discriminated against Jewish customers, in violation of Title II of the Civil Rights Act of 1964, which prohibits discrimination based on race, color, religion, or national origin in places of public accommodation.

Also in June, U.S. Democratic Representative Mark Pocan incited controversy with a tweet directed at White House deputy chief of staff Stephen Miller, who is Jewish, telling him to "go back to 1930's Germany." The White House demanded an apology, which Pocan refused.

Also in July, parents of three students at the Nysmith school in Herndon, Virginia filed a civil rights complaint against the school, alleging widespread and persistent antisemitic bullying of the pupils at the school. The complaint alleges that students drew a large image of Adolf Hitler during an assignment to draw a "great historical leader," and telling the three Jewish students that Jews are "baby killers" who deserved to die. The three Jewish students were expelled in the aftermath of the complaint.

American rapper Kanye West released an antisemitic song called "Heil Hitler." It was banned from streaming platforms.

In October, 2025, the Heritage Foundation publicly supported Tucker Carlson after Carlson invited the neo-Nazi and Holocaust denier Nick Fuentes onto his podcast. The Heritage Foundation's defense of Carlson ignited a debate about antisemitism among conservatives. Republicans including Ted Cruz and Mitch McConnell condemned the Heritage Foundation's defense of Tucker Carlson.

In December, on the first night of Hanukkah, a Jewish family’s California home, decorated for the holiday, was attacked when a gunman in a passing vehicle fired several shots from an airsoft gun at the residence while shouting antisemitic slurs, an incident captured on security footage. According to police, the family was targeted because of the Hanukkah decorations and the attack is being investigated as a potential hate crime. The incident occurred amid a broader rise in antisemitic threats and violence in the United States and internationally during the Hanukkah period.

Amid the mass deportation campaign in the second Trump administration and in the aftermath of the killing of Alex Pretti by US Border Patrol agents in Operation Metro Surge in January, Border Patrol field leader Gregory Bovino is said to have mocked United States Attorney in Minnesota Daniel N. Rosen, an Orthodox Jew, for being Jewish.

The Israeli Ministry of Foreign Affairs denounced New York Times journalist Nicholas Kristof's May 2026 op-ed "The Silence That Meets the Rape of Palestinians" as "Hamas propaganda" and "one of the worst blood libels ever to appear in the modern press", and Israeli Prime Minister Benjamin Netanyahu and his Minister of Foreign Affairs Gideon Sa'ar announced legal action against The New York Times for libel.

The ADL's 2025 audit, issued in spring 2026, found 6,000 antisemitic incidents in 2025, which represented a small decrease, but assaults for the year had increased. New York, California and New Jersey saw the highest number of incidents.

=== List of 21st century violent attacks (in chronological order) ===
- 2003 – Murder of Ariel Sellouk.
- 2006 – Seattle Jewish Federation shooting at the Jewish Federation of Greater Seattle building in Seattle, Washington by Naveed Haq. One dead and six others injured.
- 2009 – United States Holocaust Memorial Museum shooting
- 2014 – Overland Park shootings at the Jewish Community Center of Greater Kansas City and Village Shalom in Overland Park, Kansas by former Klansman Frazier Glenn Miller Jr. Three people died in the shooting.
- 2018 – Murder of Blaze Bernstein at Borrego Park in Orange County, California by Atomwaffen Division (AWD) member Samuel Woodard in Orange County, California.
- 2018 – Pittsburgh synagogue shooting at Tree of Life - Or L'Simcha Congregation by Gab user Robert Bowers in Pittsburgh, Pennsylvania. Eleven dead and six others injured.
- * 2019 – Poway synagogue shooting at the Chabad of Poway by John Timothy Earnest in Poway, California. One dead and six others injured.
- * 2019 Jersey City shooting at JC Kosher Supermarket by Black Hebrew Israelites David Anderson and Francine Graham in Jersey City, New Jersey. Five dead and three others injured (including perpetrators)
- 2019 – Monsey Hanukkah stabbing at Forshay Road in Monsey, New York by Black Hebrew Israelites member Grafton E. Thomas. Five injured. Three months after the attack, 72-year-old victim Josef Neumann died from his wounds.
- 2021 – Beating of Joseph Borgen in Times Square – Kippah-wearing American called a "dirty Jew", pepper‑sprayed, concussed, bludgeoned, and kicked by several pro‑Palestinian demonstrators.
- 2022 – Colleyville synagogue hostage crisis – Four hostages including the Rabbi taken at a synagogue in Colleyville, Texas.
- 2024 – A pro-Palestinian rally taking place outside a Synagogue in Los Angeles, California turned into a chaotic street violence with pro-Israel counterprotesters. Several officials, including President Joe Biden, have criticized the incident as antisemitic. A Jewish woman was beaten at the scene. At least two lawsuits have been filed against the protest groups, alleging that they violated the law by blocking people from attending a religious event.
- 2024 – A visibly Jewish man was attacked while walking down the street in Norman, Oklahoma by a man who called him a "dirty Jew". The victim was taken to the hospital suffering from bruises and a cerebral hemorrhage, making international news. However, the Norman Police Department later stated that obtained video footage depicted "significant disagreement" with this narrative and that the "reporting party, initially reported as the victim" of a hate crime was shown on video to actually be the "aggressor," who engaged an individual in a series of "mutual combat."
- 2025 – an Egyptian national named Mohamed Soliman was charged after using a garden sprayer filled with gasoline and a Molotov cocktail to injure 15 people and kill another in an antisemitic attack in Boulder, Colorado Soliman had previously attempted to purchase a firearm but was denied; police stated that he stated that this was because of his immigration status. Democrats condemned the attack and used the incident to promote gun control.
- 2025 – Jewish U.S. Representative Max Miller from Ohio said he was run off the road in an antisemitic road rage incident while driving to work. The suspect, who later turned himself in to authorities, reportedly used antisemitic slurs, waved a Palestinian flag, and threatened Miller and his family.
- 2025 – a Jewish man in Missoula, Montana was attacked by a self-proclaimed Nazi.
- 2025 – A Jewish family’s California home, decorated for the first night of Hanukkah, was targeted in a suspected hate crime when a man in a passing vehicle fired shots from an airsoft gun while shouting antisemitic slurs.
- 2026 – A vehicle repeatedly struck the entrance of the Chabad-Lubavitch World Headquarters at the 770 Eastern Parkway in Brooklyn, New York City, causing damage. Police arrested the driver at the scene and evacuated the building; no injuries were reported, and a NYPD bomb squad found no explosives in the vehicle. Authorities, including the NYPD Hate Crimes Task Force, opened an investigation into the incident as a possible hate crime.
- 2026 – On International Holocaust Remembrance Day, a rabbi walking to a synagogue in Forest Hills, Queens, was verbally harassed with antisemitic slurs and physically assaulted. Police arrested a suspect shortly afterward and charged him with assault and related hate-crime offenses.
- 2026 – Two men who spoke Hebrew in a Santana Row restaurant, San Jose, California, were violently assaulted. The attacker allegedly shouted at them "don't mess with Iran" and antisemitic slurs. Video footage showed the victims being punched and kicked in an incident investigated as a possible antisemitic hate crime.
- 2026 – On March 12, a shooting and vehicle-ramming attack occurred at Temple Israel, a Reform synagogue in West Bloomfield Township, Michigan. 41-year-old Ayman Mohamed Ghazali rammed his vehicle into the building, drove inside the facility and reportedly opened fire before he was killed. The vehicle caught fire, possibly from something flammable inside, and severely burned Ghazali's body. One security guard was struck and injured by the vehicle.

== Antisemitism on college campuses ==
Many Jewish intellectuals who fled from Nazi Germany after Adolf Hitler's rise to power in the 1930s immigrated to the United States. There, they hoped to continue their academic careers, but barring a scant few, they found little acceptance in elite institutions in Depression-era America with its undercurrent of antisemitism. Instead, they found work in historically black colleges and universities in the American South.

=== Israel-related allegations ===
On April 3, 2006, the U.S. Commission on Civil Rights announced its finding that incidents of antisemitism, including "anti-Israeli or anti-Zionist propaganda", are a "serious problem" on college campuses throughout the United States. The Commission recommended for the U.S. Department of Education's Office for Civil Rights to protect college students from antisemitism by vigorous enforcement of Title VI of the Civil Rights Act of 1964. It further recommended for the U.S. Congress to clarify that Title VI applies to discrimination against Jewish students.

In February 2015, the Louis D. Brandeis Center for Human Rights Under Law and Trinity College presented the results of a national survey of American Jewish college students. The survey had a 10–12% response rate and did not claim to be representative. The report showed that 54% of the 1,157 self-identified Jewish students at 55 campuses nationwide who took part in the online survey reported having experienced or witnessed antisemitism on their campuses during the Spring semester of the last academic year.

In 2017, a report by Brandeis University's Steinhardt Social Research Institute, with a foreword by pro-Israel advocate Kenneth L. Marcus, examined cases and views on campus antisemitism, in which it included matters relating to Israel and Zionism. The report indicated that most Jewish students never experience anti-Jewish remarks or physical attacks. The study, "Limits to Hostility," notes that even though it is often reported in the news, actual antisemitic hostility remains rare on most campuses and is seldom encountered by Jewish students. The study attempted to document the student experience at the campus level, adding detail to previous national-level surveys. The report summary highlights the finding that antisemitism exists on campus, but "Jewish students do not think their campus is hostile to Jews."

The National Demographic Survey of American Jewish College Students provided a summary of the type, context, and location of antisemitism as it was experienced by a large national sample of Jewish students on university and four-year college campuses. Inside Higher Ed focused on the more other findings of the report, such as the finding that high rates of antisemitism were also reported at institutions regardless of their location or type. Data collected after the survey suggested that discrimination occurs during low-level, everyday interpersonal activities, and Jewish students feel that their reports of antisemitism are largely ignored by the administration. However, not all of the reception was positive, and The Forward argued that the study documented only a snapshot in time, rather than a trend; it did not survey a representative sample of Jewish college students; and it was flawed by allowing students to define antisemitism and thus the term open to interpretation.

In September 2021, in collaboration with the Cohen Group, the Brandeis Center conducted a poll of American Jewish fraternity and sorority members. The survey found that more than 65% of the respondents had experienced or were familiar with an antisemitic attack in the previous 120 days. Nearly half of the respondents felt the need to hide their Jewish identity out of fear.

=== Gaza-related allegations ===
The October 7, 2023, Israel–Hamas conflict has significantly impacted the prevalence of antisemitism on college campuses across the United States. Many Jewish students and organizations have reported an increase in harassment, discrimination, and intimidation during and after protests linked to the conflict. Examples include instances of swastika graffiti on campus property, the assault of students for expressing pro-Israel views, and overall increases in antisemitic acts, especially on college campuses. These incidents have intensified debates over free speech and the responsibilities of universities to address hate speech.

After October 7, 2023, antisemitism became one of the biggest problems Jewish students faced on campus. More Jewish students worried about antisemitism and Israel related opposition rather than being worried about normal college worries, including grades, jobs, and social life.

Reports from the Anti-Defamation League (ADL) highlight a marked increase in antisemitic incidents following October 7, 2023. The ADL documented 5,204 antisemitic incidents in the months following the conflict, a sum greater than the total amount of incidents from all of 2022. On college campuses, incidents spiked by 321%, totaling 922 reported cases. Fifty-two percent of post-October 7 incidents referenced Israel, Zionism, or Palestine. Despite the focus on these geopolitical issues, antisemitic incidents unrelated to Israel also increased by 65% year-over-year, underscoring the widespread nature of the problem.

Following a February 26, 2024 protest to stop a UC Berkeley campus event organized by Club Z, the U.S. House Committee on Education and the Workforce opened an inquiry on March 19th to investigate allegations of antisemitism on campus.

In January 2025, Harvard University settled two civil rights lawsuits alleging inadequate protection of Jewish students from antisemitism on campus. As part of the settlement, Harvard adopted the IHRA definition of antisemitism in its nondiscrimination policies. The agreement also included commitments to provide expert training on antisemitism for staff and students, clarify that targeting Zionists constitutes harassment, and an undisclosed monetary payment. While Harvard denied any wrongdoing, this settlement highlights increasing attention to antisemitism within U.S. higher education. The adoption of the IHRA definition remains controversial, with supporters advocating for its comprehensive approach to combating antisemitism and critics warning against potential restrictions on free speech.

On February 3, 2025, the day following an article by professor Steven Davidoff Solomon titled, "Mr. Trump, Investigate My Campus", the U.S. Department of Education announced an extension of 2024 UC Berkeley investigation, citing "almost no discipline for antisemitic violations" following the 2024 inquiry. On March 5, 2025 The Department of Justice announced its own investigation in partnership with the Equal Employment Opportunity Commission, focusing on antisemitic discrimination against UC Berkeley professors, staff, and other employees. The Trump administration launched an additional unrelated investigation into UC Berkeley in April 2025, regarding the enforcement of Section 117, asserting that UC Berkeley failed to report $220 million in funding from the Chinese government to build a joint Tsinghua-Berkeley Shenzhen Institute (TBSI).

On February 24, 2026, the U.S. Department of Justice filed a federal lawsuit against the University of California, Los Angeles (UCLA) alleging that the university allowed a hostile work environment for Jewish and Israeli faculty and staff after a wave of pro-Palestinian protests on campus. The lawsuit also claims that UCLA failed to address antisemitic harassment and discrimination, including tolerating protest encampments that restricted access and featured harassing conduct against Jewish and Israeli employees. UCLA says it has implemented steps to strengthen campus safety and combat antisemitism.

== Efforts to combat antisemitism ==
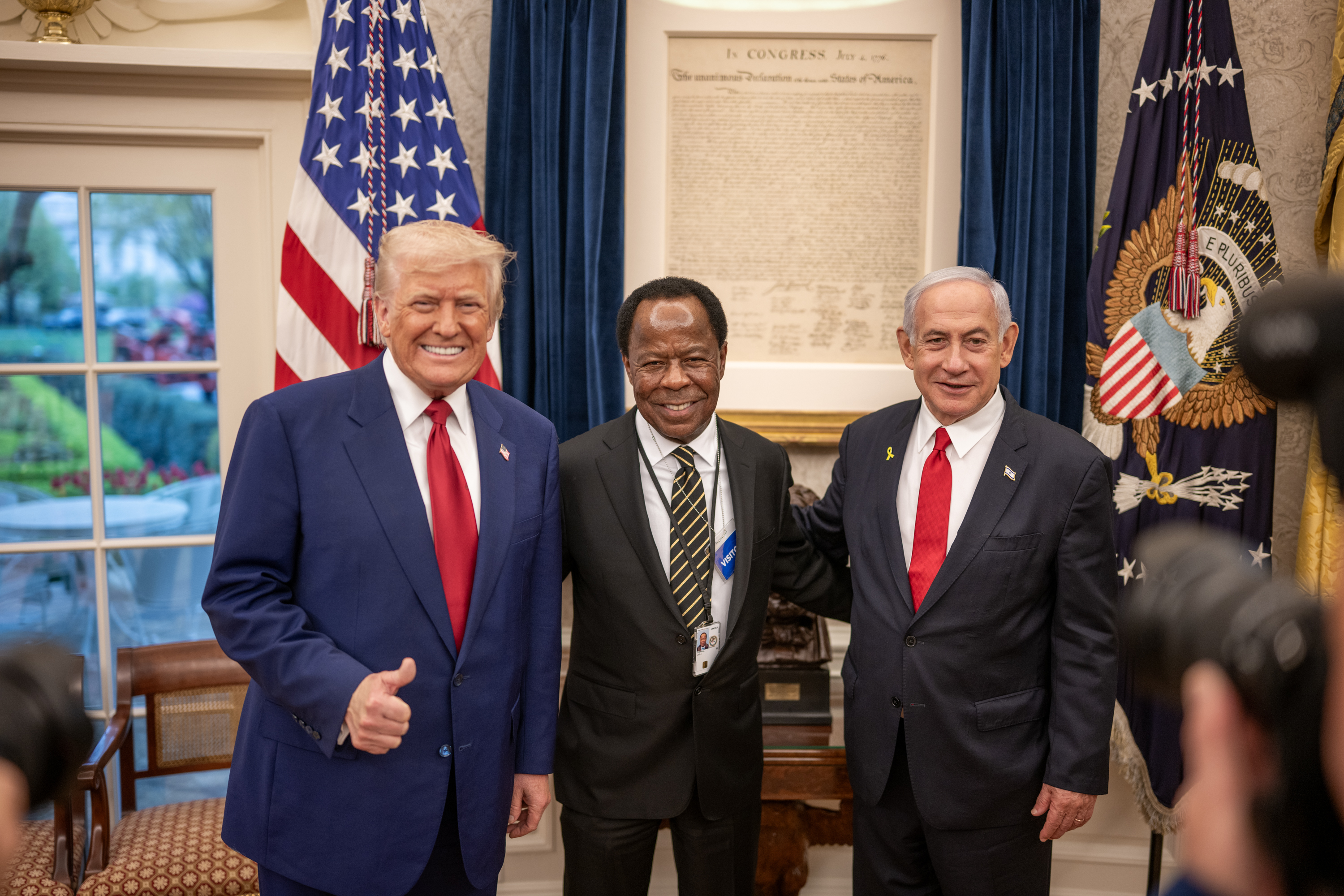
Leo Terrell, the head of the Trump administration's Task Force to Combat Antisemitism, with President Donald Trump and Israeli Prime Minister Benjamin Netanyahu on April 7, 2025

During his first election, President Donald Trump stated that he was a supporter of Israel and American Jews. Trump also signed the Executive Order on Combating Antisemitism. However, a 2019 survey by the Jewish Electorate Institute found that 73% of American Jews felt less secure during the election of Donald Trump to the presidency. After 2016, antisemitic attacks against synagogues contributed to this fear. The 2019 survey found that combatting antisemitism was a priority issue in domestic politics among American Jews, including millennials.

On May 27, 2021, The American Lawyer published a public statement, signed by 17 global law firms, in which it denounced the increasing number of antisemitic attacks in the U.S. Prominent members of the African-American community have also spoken out against antisemitism, including Kareem Abdul-Jabbar and Zach Banner.

In December 2022, taking a joint stand against the increasing number of instances of racism and antisemitism in the United States, African-American leaders, New York City Mayor Eric Adams, Reverends Al Sharpton and Conrad Tillard, and Vista Equity Partners CEO and Carnegie Hall Chairman Robert F. Smith, joined Jewish leaders, Rabbi Shmuley Boteach and Elisha Wiesel, and jointly hosted 15 Days of Light, celebrating Hanukkah and Kwanzaa in a unifying holiday ceremony at Carnegie Hall. Sharpton said: "There is never a time more needed than now for Blacks and Jews to remember the struggle that we've gone through. You can't fight for anybody if you don't fight for everybody. I cannot fight for Black rights if I don't fight for Jewish rights ... because then it becomes a matter of self-aggrandizement rather than fighting for humanity. It's easy for Blacks to stand up for racism. It's easy for Jews to stand up to antisemitism. But if you want to really be a leader, you got to speak as a Black against antisemitism and antisemites, and you got to speak as a Jew against racism." Smith said: "When we unify the souls of our two communities, we can usher in light to banish the darkness of racism, bigotry, and antisemitism."

In 2023, the Biden administration launched the U.S. National Strategy to Counter Antisemitism, and in 2024, the US State Department (together with 35 other countries) released non-binding global guidelines for countering antisemitism. In August 2024, the US Department of Homeland Security announced that it had allocated $454.5 million for the 2024 fiscal year to securing Jewish religious institutions in light of rising antisemitism. This was a $150 million increase from the 2023 budget.

In February 2025, Leo Terrell, the chair of the Department of Justice's Task Force to Combat Antisemitism, announced that he would investigate Columbia University, Harvard University, George Washington University, Johns Hopkins University, New York University, Northwestern University, Berkeley University, the University of California, the University of Minnesota, and the University of Southern California as part of the Department of Justice's broader investigation into antisemitism on college campuses. In 2026, a judge threw out the case against Harvard University.

== See also ==
- Antisemitism during the 2026 Iran war
- Antisemitism by country § United States
- Antisemitism during the Gaza war § United States
- Antisemitism in US higher education
  - Universities and antisemitism § United States
- Boycott, Divestment and Sanctions
  - Anti-BDS laws
- Freedom of religion in the United States
  - Religious discrimination in the United States
- History of antisemitism § United States
  - History of antisemitism in the United States
- History of religion in the United States
  - History of the Jews in the United States
- International response to the Holocaust
  - United States and the Holocaust
- Interminority racism in the United States
- List of antisemitic incidents in the United States
- List of attacks on Jewish institutions in the United States
- Lynching of American Jews, an aspect of lynching in the United States
  - Fascism in the United States
  - Right-wing terrorism § United States
- Universities and antisemitism § United States
