= Woodcreek High School =

Location
- 2551 Woodcreek Oaks Blvd; Roseville, California 95747; United States; 38.7625°N 121.3326°W

Information
- Type: Public
- Established: 1994
- School district: Roseville Joint Union High School District
- Principal: Suanne Bell
- Staff: 87.94 (FTE)
- Grades: 9-12
- Enrollment: 1,988 (2022-2023)
- Student to teacher ratio: 22.61
- Colors: Maroon, White & Black
- Mascot: Timberwolf
- Newspaper: Wolf Pack Press
- Website: woodcreek.rjuhsd.us

Woodcreek High School is one of many schools in the Roseville Joint Union High School District. This school is located at 2551 Woodcreek Oaks Blvd in Roseville, California, United States. Woodcreek has over 2,100 students.

== History ==
Woodcreek High School was established in 1994. When it opened it served as a high school for Roseville and the surrounding area in the newer section of the town. As the population of Placer County increased, many schools were assigned to the Roseville Joint Union High School District. It is one of the six (the other five being Roseville High, Oakmont High, Antelope High, Granite Bay High, and West Park High) common high schools in the Roseville Joint Union High School District.

== Notable alumni ==
- Steven Anderson (1999), founder of the New Independent Fundamentalist Baptist movement
- Nathan Owens (2002), actor
- Dominic Sandoval (2003), dancer and YouTube personality
- Stephen Nogosek (2013), pitcher for the Kansas City Royals
- Anthony Luke (2015), WWE wrestler and former CFL defensive end
- Jordan Brown (2018 - transferred), basketball player who plays overseas
- Mackenzie George (2018), soccer player for Brooklyn FC
- Breanna Ruggiero (2018), WWE professional wrestler
