= Steven Anderson (pastor) =

Independent fundamentalist Baptist pastor

Steven Lee Anderson
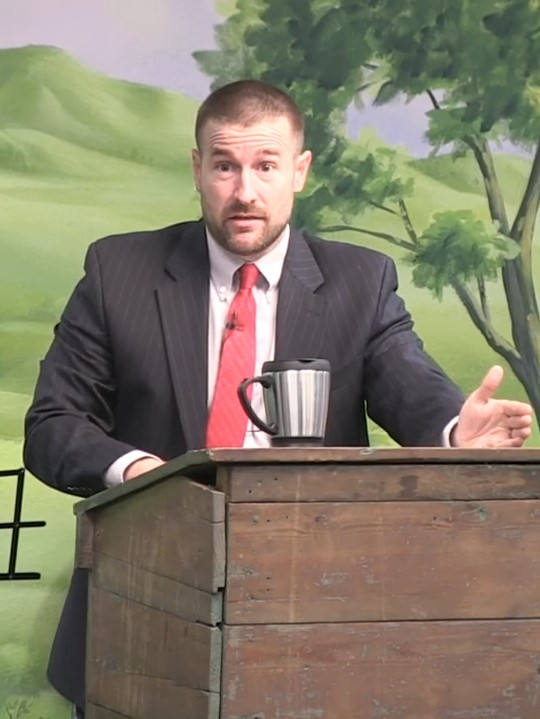
- Anderson preaching a sermon on the post-Tribulation Rapture in 2017

Personal life
- Born: Steven Lee Anderson; July 24, 1981 (age 45) Sacramento, California, U.S.
- Spouse: Zsuzsanna Anderson (m. 2000)
- Children: 12
- Education: Woodcreek High School
- Occupation: Pastor
- Website: sanderson1611.blogspot.com

Religious life
- Religion: Christianity
- Denomination: Independent Baptist (New Independent Fundamental Baptist)
- Church: Faithful Word Baptist Church

Steven Lee Anderson (born July 24, 1981) is an American preacher, filmmaker, and founder of the New Independent Fundamental Baptist movement. He is pastor of Faithful Word Baptist Church in Phoenix, Arizona. Anderson has shared views which criticize the Roman Catholic Church, the Eastern Orthodox Church, and other Christian denominations. He has advocated for the death penalty for homosexuals and prayed for the deaths of former U.S. president Barack Obama and media personality Caitlyn Jenner. He produced a documentary titled Marching to Zion in which he "championed a wide range of antisemitic stereotypes," according to Matthew H. Brittingham of Emory University. He and his supporters follow Young Earth creationism, though not the Ussher Chronology of 4004 B.C as the date for the creation of the world, but rather Anderson's own calculations, which place the creation of the earth at 4234 B.C

Anderson has been banned from many countries, in succession: South Africa, the United Kingdom, Botswana, Canada, Jamaica, the Schengen Area, Ireland, Australia, and New Zealand.

== Early life ==
Anderson was born in Sacramento, California, to an Independent Fundamentalist Baptist family, and he attended Woodcreek High School, in Roseville.

== Faithful Word Baptist Church ==
Anderson established Faithful Word Baptist Church as a fundamentalist Independent Baptist church in Phoenix, Arizona, on Christmas Day in December 2005 and he remains its pastor. The church describes itself as "an old-fashioned, independent, fundamental, King James Bible–only, soul-winning Baptist church." Members of the church meet in an office space that is located inside a strip mall.

While some have mischaracterized the group as non-denominational, Independent Fundamental Baptist churches are a unique Baptist denomination of their own. Anderson has used his influence to create the New Independent Fundamentalist Baptist movement, which includes other churches.

The church has been described as an anti-gay hate group by the Southern Poverty Law Center due to Anderson's advocation for the death penalty for homosexuals.

== Views ==
=== Anti-government views ===
The Southern Poverty Law Center describes him as a proponent of anti-government views. Anderson operates a website titled True Sons of Liberty where he recommends elimination of the Internal Revenue Service, the Federal Reserve Bank, the Social Security Administration, and child protective services. He has appeared on InfoWars on numerous occasions, and the InfoWars store formerly offered for sale video productions by Anderson. (Note: In a 2016 video titled Alex Jones and Info Wars Exposed!, Anderson explained that he used to be a supporter of Alex Jones but later denounced him due to his support of then presidential candidate Donald Trump, whom Anderson strongly opposes.)

=== Antisemitism ===
According to information which has been collected and cited by the Anti-Defamation League, Anderson has "a history of antisemitism through his sermons and a series of YouTube videos." Emory University PhD candidate Matthew Brittingham suggested that Anderson is part of a connected but "diffuse group of theologically-focused, antisemitic Christian conspiracists who deny the Holocaust." In March 2015, Anderson released a documentary titled Marching to Zion, in which he argued that the anticipated Jewish messiah is the Antichrist and that the Talmud is blasphemous. The pastor and conspiracy theorist Texe Marrs appears in the documentary. In May 2015, he posted a YouTube video, titled "The Holocaust Hoax Exposed," promoting Holocaust denial. (Note: For additional reference, The Holocaust Hoax Exposed can be viewed at archive.org) Anderson has also promoted conspiracy theories about Jewish control of the American government and media, as well as the Khazar hypothesis.

=== "Why I Hate Barack Obama" sermon ===
The church received national attention in the United States in August 2009, when Anderson delivered a sermon—entitled "Why I Hate Barack Obama"—in which he said he prayed for the death of the president. (Note: For additional reference, Why I Hate Barack Obama can be viewed at archive.org)

While Anderson did not solicit the killing of President Obama, he did suggest that the country would "benefit" from his death. Anderson told local television station KNXV-TV that he would like it if Obama were to die of natural causes because he does not "want [Obama] to be a martyr" and "we don't need another holiday." He told columnist Michelangelo Signorile that he "would not judge or condemn" anyone who killed President Obama.

Anderson's invective against Obama stems in part from his opposition to Obama's support for abortion rights. Anderson was then the recipient of death threats while a group, People Against Clergy Who Preach Hate, organized a "love rally" which was attended by approximately one hundred people outside the church.

The day after Anderson delivered his "Why I Hate Barack Obama" sermon, a church member, Chris Broughton, carried an AR-15 semiautomatic rifle and a pistol to the Phoenix Convention Center, where President Obama was speaking. Broughton explained that he was not motivated by the sermon although he agreed with it. Broughton's appearance at the rally was part of a publicity stunt that was organized by conservative radio talk show host Ernest Hancock, who also came to the rally armed, and engaged in a staged interview with Broughton which was later broadcast on YouTube. Anderson told ABC News affiliate KNXV-TV in Phoenix that the U.S. Secret Service contacted him after this event.

=== Westboro Baptist Church ===
In a sermon on August 18, 2019, Anderson condemned the Westboro Baptist Church for their activity. “Okay, but is there any fruit? Is there any building going on? Is there any planting going on? Or is it just all negative, all the time?” and later, he did the same to their late founder Fred Phelps for his approach on preaching. “False prophet! The guy had a wrong salvation, wrong gospel, wrong doctrine, not saved, total heresy,” Anderson said. “And he’s just getting up and just ripping on homos all the time. But when did he ever get up and preach the gospel of Jesus Christ? Never. When did he ever have a positive message about reaching people with the gospel, winning souls, all the good things? Never.”

== Controversies ==
=== Border Patrol checkpoint incident ===
In 2009, Anderson had a confrontation with United States Border Patrol agents at an interior checkpoint on Interstate 8, about 70 miles (110 km) east of Yuma, Arizona. He refused to move his car or roll down his windows, triggering a 90-minute standoff and the calling of Arizona Department of Public Safety officers to the scene. The confrontation ended when authorities broke Anderson's car windows, tased him, and forced him out of the vehicle. Anderson said they beat him while he was lying prone on the ground.

At his arraignment in April 2009, Anderson pleaded not guilty to two misdemeanor counts of resisting a lawful order. He was acquitted of the two charges by a jury in August 2010. (Note: In 2015, Anderson created a documentary style video about the 2009 incident titled Failure to Obey and published it on YouTube.)

=== Travel bans ===
As of 2019, Anderson has been banned from more than 30 countries, including every English-speaking developed country other than the United States (his home country) and most English-speaking African countries. In September 2016, after he had announced his intention to travel to South Africa, Malusi Gigaba, the Minister for Home Affairs, banned Anderson and his followers, citing the Constitution of South Africa and stating that he has "identified Steven Anderson as an undesirable person to travel to South Africa," even though Anderson said he had neither the authority or willingness to ban him from entering the country.

Anderson was also banned from entering the United Kingdom, leading him to change his travel route to Botswana by flying via Ethiopia. On September 20, 2016, he was banned and deported from Botswana.

In a YouTube video, Anderson mentioned a planned missionary trip to Malawi to set up a church there, but Malawian authorities subsequently made it known that he would not be welcome in the country and that he would also be banned from entering it in the future.

Anderson was denied entry to Canada on November 10, 2017.

On January 29, 2018, Anderson was banned from entering Jamaica.

Anderson was scheduled to preach in Amsterdam, on May 23, 2019. The Dutch government began looking into banning him from entering on April 24, leading to the factual ban from the Netherlands, and the rest of the European Union's Schengen Area on May 1. According to the Dutch state secretary, there is "no space for discrimination or the encouragement of hate, intolerance or violence in a democratic Rechtsstaat like ours."

The Republic of Ireland banned him on May 12, 2019. On July 23, 2019, Anderson was denied entry to Australia. On August 7, 2019, Anderson was denied entry to New Zealand.

=== Swatting ===
On April 4, 2022, Anderson and his family were swatted. The caller falsely claimed that Anderson had shot his wife and that there were "multiple [other] bodies" present in his home. No one was harmed; a police investigation concluded the call was made in bad faith.

=== Domestic abuse remarks ===
In September 2026, Anderson drew criticism after saying that a wife who called police after being physically assaulted by her husband was “evil”. On September 16, Faithful Word Baptist Church listed a sermon by Anderson titled Staying in an Abusive Marriage. Anderson also posted on social media, “Don’t call the cops on your spouse.”

== Personal life ==
Anderson met his wife Zsuzsanna in Munich, Bavaria, when he presented her with the gospel. Zsuzsanna was raised as a Roman Catholic, but she had become an agnostic as a young adult; she later converted to fundamentalist Baptist Christianity. Anderson and Zsuzsanna were married in 2000. As of June 2023, the couple has twelve children, eight of whom are minors and they are currently homeschooled. Their four oldest children, who are now grown, have each said they have been excommunicated. Those four have also accused their parents of domestic abuse.
