= Faithful Word Baptist Church =

Independent Baptist church in Phoenix, Arizona, US

Coordinates: 33°27′10″N 112°07′52″W

Faithful Word Baptist Church is a New Independent Fundamentalist Baptist church in Phoenix, Arizona, that was founded by Steven Anderson. The church describes itself as "an old-fashioned, independent, fundamental, King James Bible-only, soul-winning Baptist church." Members of the church previously met in an office space that is located inside a strip mall. Anderson established the church in December 2005 and remains its pastor.

In August 2009, the church received national attention when Anderson stated in a sermon that he was praying for the death of then-president Barack Obama. The Southern Poverty Law Center (SPLC) listed Faithful Word Baptist Church as an anti-gay hate group, citing its pastor's "extremely radical stance" that homosexuals should be judged and executed according to the Law of Moses. Its documentary titled Marching to Zion was labeled as antisemitic by the Anti-Defamation League. Its pastor was refused entry to South Africa, Botswana, Jamaica, Canada, the United Kingdom, the Schengen Area, the Republic of Ireland, Australia, and New Zealand.

== Doctrine ==
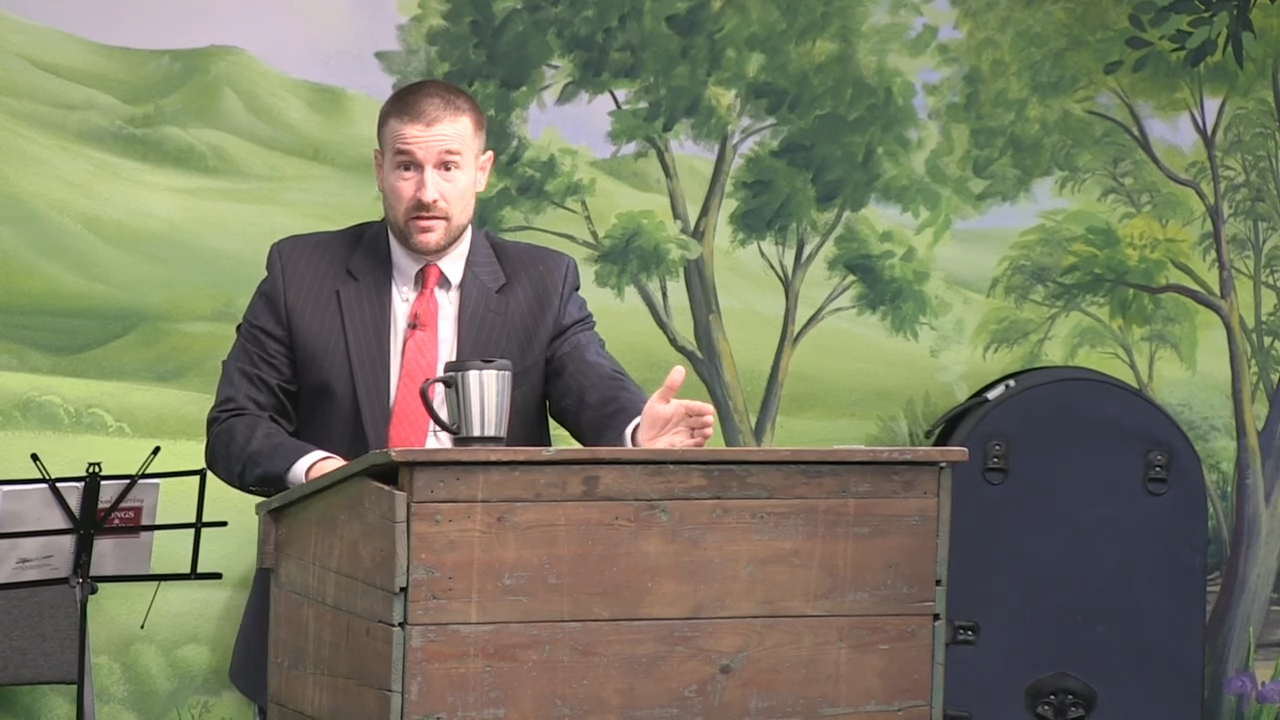
Steven Anderson preaching a sermon on the post-tribulation rapture, a core doctrine of his church, on April 30, 2017

According to its doctrinal statement, Faithful Word Baptist Church believes that the King James Bible is the inerrant Word of God. It is Trinitarian and rejects modalism. The church also believes in the posttribulation rapture, salvation by grace through faith, and eternal torment in hell for the unsaved. Among the church's beliefs is the view that life begins at conception, the view that homosexuality is a sin and an abomination which God punishes with the death penalty, and opposition to worldliness, formalism, modernism, and liberalism.

Faithful Word Baptist Church is strictly anti-abortion. In vitro fertilization is seen as murder, because embryos are discarded during the process.

Anderson has preached against feminism, referring to Iceland as "a feminist hell."

They follow Young Earth creationism, though not the Ussher Chronology of 4004 B.C as the date for the creation of the world, but rather Steven's own calculations, which place the creation of the earth at 4234 B.C

== History ==
Anderson established the church on Christmas Day, 2005. The church's website states, "Faithful Word Baptist Church is a totally independent Baptist church, and Pastor Anderson was sent out by a totally independent Baptist church to start it the old-fashioned way by knocking on doors and winning souls to Christ." About a year and a half later the church was moved to a strip mall that was also used by Anderson's fire alarm installation business. By 2015, the congregation numbered around 150 members.

=== National attention over Anderson's sermon on President Obama ===
The church received national attention in the United States in August 2009, when Anderson gave a sermon—entitled Why I Hate Barack Obama—in which he said he prayed for the death of the president.

Anderson did not solicit the killing of Obama but he did suggest that the country would "benefit" from his death. Anderson also told the local television station KNXV-TV that he would like it if Obama were to die of natural causes because he does not "want him to be a martyr" and he also believes that "we don't need another holiday". Anderson told columnist Michelangelo Signorile that he "would not judge or condemn" anyone who killed the president.

Anderson's invective against Obama is partially based on his opposition to Obama's support for abortion rights. Anderson was then the recipient of death threats while a group, People Against Clergy Who Preach Hate, organized a "love rally" which was attended by approximately one hundred people outside the church.

The day after Anderson delivered his Why I Hate Barack Obama sermon, a church member, Chris Broughton, carried an AR-15 semiautomatic rifle and a pistol to the Phoenix Convention Center, where President Obama was speaking. Broughton explained that he was not motivated by the sermon although he agreed with it. The New Mexico Independent reported that Broughton's appearance at the rally was part of a publicity stunt that was organized by conservative radio talk show host Ernest Hancock, who also came to the rally armed, and engaged in a staged interview with Broughton which was later broadcast on YouTube. Anderson told ABC News affiliate KNXV-TV in Phoenix that the Secret Service contacted him after this event.

=== Anti-gay comments and hate group designation ===
The SPLC has listed the church as an anti-gay hate group, noting that in his anti-LGBT rhetoric, Anderson described gays as "sodomites who recruit through rape" and "recruit through molestation." In explaining the hate group designation, the SPLC noted Anderson's position that homosexuals should be killed, citing a sermon in which he said, "The biggest hypocrite in the world is the person who believes in the death penalty for murderers but not in the death penalty for homosexuals." In late 2014 Anderson told his congregation that an AIDS-free Christmas would be possible "Because if you executed the homos like God recommends, you wouldn't have all this AIDS running rampant." Anderson has also been vocal in expressing his hatred for transgender people, stating during a sermon titled 6 Types of Prayer that he hopes that Caitlyn Jenner's heart explodes.

In a sermon, Anderson said that in the November 2015 Paris attacks the victims brought the attack upon themselves by being devil worshipers for attending a concert by the Eagles of Death Metal band, and he also said that France was a sinful nation. In a video which he posted on YouTube following the 2016 Orlando nightclub shooting, Anderson said it was good that there were "50 less pedophiles in this world," but he also said that it was bad that there were survivors. He also said that there would be a backlash against gun rights and religious fundamentalism, both Christian and Islamic. He also said that the killings should not have been carried out by a vigilante, instead, he believes that they should have been carried out "through the proper channels by a righteous government."

=== Videos ===
In March 2015, Anderson produced a documentary titled Marching to Zion, in which he argued that the anticipated Jewish messiah is the Antichrist and the Talmud is blasphemous. (Note: In Anderson's video Marching to Zion, he argues that the anticipated Jewish messiah is the Antichrist and the Talmud is blasphemous.) In May 2015, Anderson promoted Holocaust denial by posting a now blacklisted YouTube documentary titled The Holocaust Hoax Exposed. (Note: Anderson promoted Holocaust denial in his video The Holocaust Hoax Exposed) In 2017, Anderson produced the documentary Babylon USA, where he and his associates argue that the United States is the prophesized Whore of Babylon and is run by Freemasons. In 2021, NIFB Pastor Jonathan Shelley released a documentary titled The Sodomite Deception starring Anderson. The film criticizes the expansion of LGBTQ rights, with Shelley advocating for the death penalty to be used on the LGBTQ community. (Note: The Sodomite Deception celebrates the brutal punishment of homosexuals.)

=== German branch ===
In May 2022, a Faithful Word Baptist Church branch was founded in the German city of Pforzheim. The preachings of Anselm Urban, German representative of the Faithful Word Baptist Church, appointed by Anderson himself, made headlines in local newspapers, as he had openly wished death upon Sven Lehmann, the German Commissioner for the Acceptance of Sexual and Gender Diversity (Note: (Translated from german): Upon request, the preacher replied in a calm fashion: "My statement was: Sven Lehmann, Faggot, die!“) and demanded the government to kill queers.

A complaint was filed, forcing Urban to pay a fine of 1020 Euros (USD $1186.25). Evading punishment, he subsequently fled the country claiming religious persecution, seeking refuge in Tempe, AZ, from where he continues preaching to his German congregation via webcast.

== See also ==
- Antisemitism in Christianity
- Christianity and homosexuality
- List of organizations designated by the Southern Poverty Law Center as anti-LGBT hate groups
- Societal attitudes toward homosexuality
- Westboro Baptist Church
