= Seattle Jewish Federation shooting =

2006 mass shooting in Washington, US

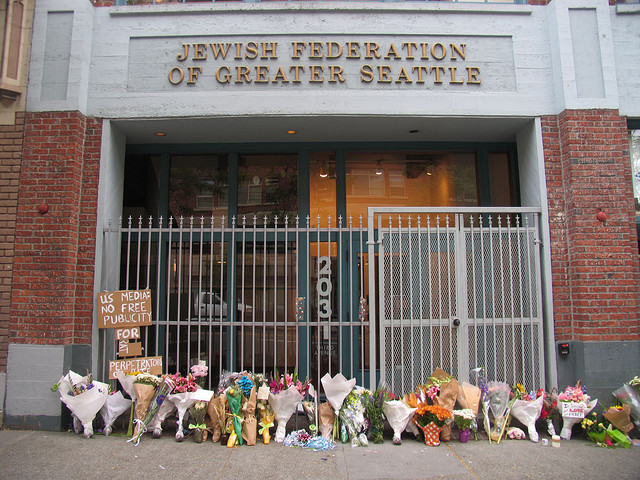
- Flowers placed outside the Jewish Federation building to memorialize the shooting.
- Location: 47°36′46″N 122°20′32″W; Belltown, Seattle, Washington, United States
- Date: July 28, 2006 c. 4:00 p.m.-4:15 p.m. (UTC-7)
- Attack type: Mass shooting, hostage crisis, hate crime
- Weapons: .45-caliber Ruger P345 handgun (unused); .40-caliber Ruger P94DAO handgun; Knife (unused)
- Deaths: 1
- Injuries: 5
- Perpetrator: Naveed Afzal Haq
- Motive: Antisemitism and Anti-Zionism

The Seattle Jewish Federation shooting took place in Seattle, United States on July 28, 2006, at around 4:00 p.m., when Naveed Afzal Haq shot six women, one fatally, at the Jewish Federation of Greater Seattle building. Before he began shooting, Haq shouted, "I am a Muslim American, angry at Israel."

After his first trial ended in a mistrial, Haq was convicted in December 2009 and sentenced to life without parole plus 120 years. Damning recordings of telephone conversations between Haq and his mother, which belied his defense of mental defect, played a role in the prosecution's determination to retry Haq. Police have classified the shooting as a hate crime based on what Haq is alleged to have said during a 9-1-1 call. King County Prosecuting Attorney Norm Maleng described the shooting as "one of the most serious crimes that has ever occurred in this city".

== Details ==
=== Preparations ===
Seattle Police Chief, Gil Kerlikowske, stated that the shooter, Naveed Afzal Haq, decided to target the Jewish Federation of Seattle when the organization showed-up in search results after he typed the phrase "something Jewish" into a search engine. Haq, while living in Pasco, Washington, legally purchased two semiautomatic handguns in local Tri-Cities, Washington-area stores; receiving both weapons July 27, 2006 after the mandatory waiting period. On his way to commit this mass shooting, Haq was pulled over by police and issued a traffic citation, but the citing officer alleged Haq hadn't done anything to arouse their suspicions at the time.

=== Shooting begins ===
Shortly before 4:00 p.m., Haq is reported to have forced his way through the Jewish Federation building's security door armed with two semi-automatic pistols (a Ruger P345 .45-caliber handgun and a Ruger P94DAO .40-caliber handgun), a knife, and extra ammunition. Police believe Haq entered the lobby of the building and grabbed the 14-year-old niece of Federation employee Cheryl Stumbo. Haq allegedly held a gun to the girl's back and forced her to use the intercom in order to gain entry to the Federation's offices.

With a gun to her back, Haq reportedly told the girl, "Open the door," and "careful", as she was buzzed into the building. Haq then said, "I'm only doing this for a statement," and proceeded to follow the girl up the stairs to the second floor. Haq stopped to ask receptionist Layla Bush about speaking with a manager, at which point the girl walked to a bathroom and locked herself inside. At this point, Cheryl Stumbo asked fellow employee Carol Goldman to call 911. But, before Goldman could complete a call, Haq shot Goldman in the knee. Stumbo's niece, in the bathroom, was already on the phone with 911.

Witnesses reported that Haq began shouting "I'm a Muslim American; I'm angry at Israel" before he began his shooting spree. Haq is reported to have walked down the hallway, shooting into offices as he passed by. Haq then shot three more women in the abdomen: Layla Bush, Stumbo, and Christina Rexroad. Pamela Waechter received a gunshot in the chest. As the wounded Waechter attempted to flee down a flight of stairs, Haq reached over the railing and shot her for the second time in the head, killing her.

=== Hostage-taking and surrender ===
Dayna Klein, a Federation employee who was five months pregnant, heard the shots being fired and as she went to the door of her office. Haq fired at her abdomen, but the bullet hit her raised arm. According to Klein, Haq then moved to another section of the building and Klein, bleeding profusely, crawled to her desk and dialed 911, despite Haq's threats to kill anyone who called the police. Haq eventually returned to Klein's office and discovered her on the phone, at which point he reportedly shouted "Now since you don't know how to ... listen, now you're the hostage, and I don't give a [expletive] if I kill you or your baby." Klein told the Seattle Post-Intelligencer that Haq "stated that he was a Muslim, [and] this was his personal statement against Jews and the Bush administration for giving money to Jews, and for us Jews for giving money to Israel, about Hezbollah, the war in Iraq, and he wanted to talk to CNN." Klein then offered Haq the phone and suggested that he tell the dispatcher what he had just told her.

Still pointing his gun at Klein, Haq took the phone and informed the police that he had taken hostages. He repeated his previous explanation that he was upset about the war in Iraq and U.S. support of Israel. He also said, "[t]hese are Jews. I'm tired of getting pushed around, and our people getting pushed around by the situation in the Middle East." He also demanded that the U.S. military get out of Iraq. He asked if he could be patched through to CNN. The dispatcher told Haq that was not possible, and informed him that talking with the media would not alter U.S. policy. Haq calmed down and told the dispatcher that he would surrender. He then put his guns down and walked silently out of the building with his hands on his head. He surrendered at 4:15 p.m. and was taken into custody by police. At 10:38 p.m., he was booked into King County Jail on one count of homicide and five counts of attempted murder.

=== Situation ends ===
After the shooting, a SWAT team entered the building, looking for other victims or suspects, while police closed off several of the city's main streets. An FBI spokesman later said the shooting was most likely the work of a "lone individual acting out antagonism toward the organization," but added that "there's nothing to indicate that it's terrorism-related."

== Legal proceedings ==
On July 29, the day after the shooting, Haq appeared in court for his bail hearing. King County, Washington District Court Judge Barbara Linde found that the King County Prosecuting Attorney's Office had probable cause to charge Haq with one count of murder and five counts of attempted murder. Before the proceedings began, Haq requested that the judge allow him to not attend the hearing. Linde denied both this request and another motion to bar cameras and video taping from the courtroom. She also set Haq's bail at $50 million. On August 2, Haq was formally charged with nine felonies: aggravated murder, five counts of attempted murder, kidnapping, burglary and malicious harassment. Malicious harassment is a hate crime under Washington State law.

Aggravated murder, the most serious of the nine charges, carried only two possible sentences in Washington at the time: life in prison or the death penalty. The prosecution, however, ultimately decided not to seek the death penalty because of Haq's history of mental illness.

During a hearing on August 10, 2006, Haq surprised the court by indicating that he wished to enter a guilty plea on all charges. The judge refused to accept this plea before a competency hearing had been conducted. Additionally, experts consulted by the Seattle Post-Intelligencer expressed doubts as to whether Haq would be allowed to plead guilty at such an early point in the legal process because the prosecution had not yet decided whether Haq would face the death penalty. On August 16, C. Wesley Richards, Haq's attorney, told the court that Haq had changed his mind and chosen to plead not guilty. Additionally, Richards said that Haq was mentally competent to stand trial since he understood the charges against him and was capable of assisting in his own defense.

One of the most difficult decisions faced by King County Prosecutor Norm Maleng was whether to request the death penalty. Two of the victims, Layla Bush and Carol Goldman, publicly opposed charging the shooter with a capital crime, with both saying that death would be "too easy for him." Additionally, prosecutors in Washington are required to consider "mitigating factors" when deciding whether to seek the death penalty. In Washington State mental illness is considered a mitigating factor and Haq's lawyers provided the prosecution with records from Haq's 10-year history of treatment for mental health problems. On December 20, 2006, more than four months after initially charging Haq with aggravated murder, Maleng announced that Haq would not face execution, but, if convicted, would be sentenced to life in prison without the possibility of parole.

Haq's trial began in the King County Courthouse (Seattle) on April 14, 2008, and was covered on Court TV. On June 4, 2008, the jury found him not guilty on one count of attempted murder (for victim Carol Goldman); on the remaining counts, the jury declared itself to be hung. The judge declared a mistrial. His second trial commenced in late 2009, and he was found guilty on all counts, including aggravated first-degree murder, on December 15, 2009. He was sentenced to life without parole plus 120 years.

== Victims ==
Five of the women were taken to Harborview Medical Center, where three were initially listed in critical condition and two in satisfactory condition, with one of the victims 17 weeks pregnant.

Pamela Waechter, the 58-year-old director of the Federation's annual fundraising campaign, was the sole fatality in the shooting. She was described as a long-time volunteer for various social service organizations and as the mother of two adult children. Waechter was shot first in the chest and then in the head while she was fleeing.

Christina Rexroad, a 29-year-old bookkeeper for the Federation and resident of Everett, Washington and Cheryl Stumbo, the Federation's 43-year-old director of marketing and communications, were shot in the abdomen and critically wounded. Layla Bush, a 23-year-old office manager and receptionist, was shot in the shoulder and abdomen, the bullet lodging next to her spine. According to her physician, the bullets damaged Bush's "liver, stomach, pancreas, left kidney and 'bruised' her heart" and would have killed her had one of the bullets struck her a half inch to the right. Bush was released from the hospital in September 2006, has a bullet lodged in her spine and at discharge was unable to walk.

35-year-old Carol Goldman was shot in the knee and elbow. The sixth victim was Dayna Klein, a 37-year-old pregnant woman responsible for development and major gifts to the organization.

Tammy Kaiser, a 33-year-old adult education director for the Federation was briefly hospitalized for injuries she received after dropping from a second-story window to escape the shooter. Kaiser and her daughter, Mia (who was 10 at the time of the shooting) later published a young adult fiction book, Diameter of the Bullet, based on the event.

== Perpetrator ==
The shooter, Naveed Afzal Haq, born September 23, 1975, was an American of Pakistani descent living in Pasco, Washington. Although Haq identified himself as "a Muslim American" during the shooting, it appears that he "was rarely seen at a local mosque for more than 10 years" before the shooting, and even converted to Christianity the previous year. He was baptized in December 2005 at the evangelical Word of Faith Center in Kennewick, but stopped attending church meetings a few months after his baptism. He appeared at his family's mosque two weeks before the shooting. In 1998 he graduated from the Rensselaer Polytechnic Institute with a biology degree, after that he attended the University of Pennsylvania’s school of dentistry but dropped out because of truancy, and in 2004 he started attending Washington State University and got an electrical engineering degree, after which he started working at Lowes. At the time of the attack, he was facing charges for exposing himself at a mall.

== Jewish Federation ==
According to its website, The Jewish Federation of Greater Seattle, founded in 1926, exists to "ensure Jewish survival and to enhance the quality of Jewish life locally, in Israel and worldwide". Jewish Federations are social service organizations that raise and distribute money for Jewish causes, particularly in their local communities, but also in Israel, and elsewhere in the world. The Jewish Federation Building, located at 2031 Third Avenue in Belltown, also housed the offices of other local Jewish organizations, such as the Washington State Jewish Historical Society, the Jewish Education Council, and the JTNews, a local Jewish newspaper. The building was demolished in 2017 to make way for a residential tower.

== Reaction ==
The Federation issued a statement saying, "Our federation colleagues so unmercifully and viciously attacked were spending their day as they normally do, providing for social and humanitarian services that benefited all of metropolitan Seattle. The hatred and violence visited upon them today offends the values that drove their work and passion for improving their neighbors' lives." Greg Nickels, the mayor of Seattle, and Gil Kerlikowske, the police chief, said the city will provide outreach assistance to the local Jewish community, and that security patrols will be deployed to protect synagogues and other Jewish buildings, as well as mosques, "because there's always the concern of retaliatory crime."

Coincidentally, the July 2006 Seattle Jewish Federation shooting occurred on the same day as the Mel Gibson DUI incident. According to one opinion piece, the deadly attack ironically received far less media coverage than the Gibson DUI incident.

The Council on American-Islamic Relations issued a joint statement with the Ithna-Ashari Muslim Association of the Northwest, the Muslim Association of Puget Sound, the Islamic Educational Center of Seattle, American Muslims of Puget Sound, and the Arab American Community Coalition:

The Muslim community of Greater Seattle area watched in horror as news broke of a shooting at the Jewish Federation building … We categorically condemn this and any similar acts of violence … We pray for the safety and health of those injured and offer our heartfelt condolences to the family of the victims of this attack. … We refuse to see the violence in the Middle East spill over to our cities and neighborhoods. We reject and categorically condemn any attacks against the Jewish community and stand in solidarity with the Jewish Federation in this tragedy.

Haq's parents also issued a statement. It read, in its entirety,

We are shocked and devastated with this tragic event. Our hearts and condolences go to the family of the deceased lady. Our deepest sympathies go to those who have been injured and we pray for their speedy recovery. We could not have imagined for a moment that our son would do this senseless act. This is utterly contrary to our beliefs and Islamic values. We have always believed and practiced in fostering love, peace and harmony with everyone, irrespective of religion, race and ethnicity.

The Church Council of Greater Seattle issued a condemnation after the shootings. Rev. Sanford Brown, director of the council, called the shootings a "senseless and immoral action in which a sick individual targeted innocent people."

== Motivation ==
Prosecutor Norm Maleng said, "Make no mistake, this is a hate crime," and that, "there is no evidence the shooting itself was an act of terrorism". This statement has been used to describe Haq's actions as a hate crime rather than terrorism (see also definition of terrorism).

Others took a different view. Cinnamon Stillwell, the Northern California Representative for conservative organization Campus Watch, wrote:

News of the shooting rampage at Seattle's Jewish Federation building last month involved the usual avoidance of the term "terrorism." Instead, the attack was labeled a hate crime and the perpetrator, Naveed Afzal Haq, just another in a long line of lone gunmen with a history of mental instability. As Seattle Mayor Greg Nickels put it, "This was a purposeful, hateful act, as far as we know by an individual acting on his own." While this may be true, trying to separate Haq's actions from the larger context of the war on terrorism is tunnel vision at its worst. It is not just hate that motivates such acts, but ideology. One needn't be a bona fide member of an Islamic terrorist group to share their outlook.

Writing in Seattle alternative weekly The Stranger, Josh Feit and Brendan Kiley viewed the matter entirely differently:

While Haq's violence exploded inside a political context — the Jewish Federation, Israel's war in Lebanon — his motivations were those of a frustrated man, who, according to [his friend] Renner, didn't fit in anywhere and felt persecuted and embarrassed by his parents' Pakistani background. Haq is not a jihadi, nor a radical Islamist; his anti-Semitic rhetoric seems more like a veneer of politics on a man disturbed by feelings of inadequacy and rejection.

== See also ==
- Antisemitism in the United States in the 21st-century
- List of attacks on Jewish institutions in the United States
