= Negroes Are Anti-Semitic Because They're Anti-White =

1967 essay by James Baldwin

- Author: James Baldwin
- Media type: Essay
- Subject: African American–Jewish relations, Racism in Jewish communities, Whiteness, Antisemitism in Christianity

"Negroes Are Anti-Semitic Because They're Anti-White" was a 1967 essay written by American writer James Baldwin that first appeared in the Sunday magazine edition of The New York Times, describing the tensions that existed in African American–Jewish relations.

== Synopsis ==
The essay is an exploration of antisemitism in African-American communities and racism in white Jewish communities. Baldwin argues that Jews in the United States have assimilated into whiteness, and that the source of "Negro anti-Semitism is that the Negro is really condemning the Jew for having become an American white man." Baldwin begins the essay by noting that he grew up in Harlem and resented the economic exploitation of the "demoralizing series of landlords", grocers, police officers, and pawnshop owners who were Jewish. Baldwin writes that if "the Jew" feels "singled out by Negroes" it is "not because he acts differently from other white men, but because he doesn't. ... And he is playing in Harlem the role assigned him by Christians long ago: he is doing their dirty work." Baldwin argues that while Jews and Black people could have been allies, the white Jewish complicity in racism prevented this. Saying that racism against Black Americans is more severe than antisemitism against American Jews, Baldwin wrote that "One does not wish to be told by an American Jew that his suffering is as great as the American Negro's suffering. It isn't, and one knows that it isn't from the very tone in which he assures you that it is."

== Reception and controversy ==
The essay sparked outrage and confusion, particularly among Jewish readers. Some Jews felt that the essay was "a passionate justification of Negro anti-Semitism", while one rabbi declared Baldwin a "Negro extremist ... who has allowed his hostility to whites to run into extra-hostility to Jews." Terrence L. Johnson and Jacques Berlinerblau, professors at Georgetown University, suggested that the "subtleties and tensions" in the essay were lost on many Jewish readers and that the essay is "far more subtle and internally tensile than its title suggests." Johnson and Berlinerblau critique the essay for ignoring the fact that the "majority of world Jewry is non-white", for instance making no mention of Black Jews in Harlem that Baldwin could have seen at time of publication.
