= Murder of Ariel Sellouk =

2003 murder in Texas, US

Ariel Sellouk was an American Jewish man murdered in 2003. His murder has been described as "a classic hate crime".

== Victim ==
Ariel Sellouk was the son of a Jewish family from Morocco that had moved to Houston, Texas, in 1992.

== Murder ==
Sellouk and Mohammed Ali Alayed met at college. Neither was religious during their friendship, and they are said to have enjoyed going out together to drink, play darts, and meet girls. The two stopped socializing together over a year before the crime, during a period when Alayed was reportedly becoming more committed to Islam.

In early August 2003, over a year since they had last seen one another, Alayed, now a religiously strict Muslim, contacted Sellouk and the two went out for drinks. They left the bar and, according to Alayed's roommate, returned to Alayed's flat at about 1 in the morning. According to The Forward, Alayed's roommate reported that Alayed pulled out a knife and began "slitting (Sellouk's) throat with such force and precision that, as the gruesome autopsy photos would later show, the young man's head was nearly severed".

Alayed's defense attorney, George Parnham, told a journalist that Ayaled's motive was unknown, but stated that Sellouk was "nearly decapitated" and that "religious differences were likely a factor." According to The Forward, the victim was, "slaughtered in a Houston apartment, his throat slit so deftly with a 6-inch butterfly knife that he was nearly decapitated." Alayed told his roommate that he intended to flee to Saudi Arabia. He remained at large for nearly a week before being discovered by police in a vacant apartment in the building where he lived.

== Murderer ==
At the time of the murder Alayed was a Saudi national who had come to Texas to study at Houston Community College, but who had dropped out of school at the time of the murder. According to court documents, he received an allowance of $60,000.00 from his parents. Alayed was described by The Forward as, "the son of a millionaire Saudi businessman (who had) been bailed out of trouble by the Saudi consulate after previous scrapes with the law. According to the Houston prosecutor, the consulate of Saudi Arabia had previously posted bail for Alayed on minor charges, and had forfeited $15,000 on one occasion when Alayed failed to appear in court after being charged with driving with a revoked license.

== Disposition ==
Alayed pleaded guilty to murder. On April 19, 2004, he was sentenced to 60 years in prison. According to Stephen St. Martin, an ADA (Assistant District Attorney) of Harris County, he was not charged with committing a hate crime because, "It didn't help me ... The hate crime statute would only enhance [the sentence] one penalty level, and murder is already at the highest level,... So I would just be stating something else that I would have to prove.… Why make my job harder?" He told a reporter, "I'm not saying it was not a hate crime ... I'm just saying that it would have been extremely difficult to prove that to a jury."

== Legacy ==
The case attracted ongoing attention in subsequent years, sometimes sparked by incidents with apparent parallels.

== See also ==
- Antisemitism in the United States in the 21st-century
