= New Independent Fundamental Baptist Movement =

Association of King James Bible only independent Baptist churches

- Abbreviation: NIFB
- Classification: Christianity
- Orientation: Independent
- Scripture: King James Version of the Christian Bible
- Polity: Congregationalist, Landmarkist
- Governance: Informally governed by Steven Anderson (disputed)
- Region: United States; Australia; Canada; Philippines; United Kingdom
- Founder: Steven L. Anderson
- Origin: 2005; Tempe, Arizona
- Separated from: Independent Baptist
- Congregations: 14
- Other name: New IFB

The New Independent Fundamental Baptist movement (also known as the New IFB or NIFB) is an association of fundamentalist Baptist churches. The New IFB traces its origins to Pastor Steven L. Anderson in Tempe, Arizona. In 2005, Anderson broke from the broader Independent Baptist movement, charging that many Independent Baptist churches had grown doctrinally soft and increasingly liberal. That same year—on Christmas Day—he launched what would become the movement's flagship church, Faithful Word Baptist Church.

The New IFB is described by the Anti-Defamation League (ADL) as "a loose network of independent churches concentrated in the U.S. connected by their belief in certain religious doctrines and a shared brand of deeply anti-LGBTQ and antisemitic teachings." According to the ADL, "anti-LGBTQ bigotry and antisemitism are fundamental to New IFB ideology, as demonstrated by the doctrinal statements on their websites and the content of their sermons." The group has been able to spread their views across the world through the usage of the Internet and social media.

Some former New IFB pastors have charged the association of being a cult. Similarly, other Independent Baptist pastors have associated the New IFB with cultic behavior, associating the group with heresy. The New IFB has been the subject of multiple controversies regarding allegations of child abuse, cover-ups, racism and for the calling for the execution of homosexuals. The movement rejects the classical doctrines of the early creeds of Christianity.

== History ==
The New IFB was formed by Anderson and other Baptist pastors in an attempt to revive what they perceived older independent Baptist churches once represented.

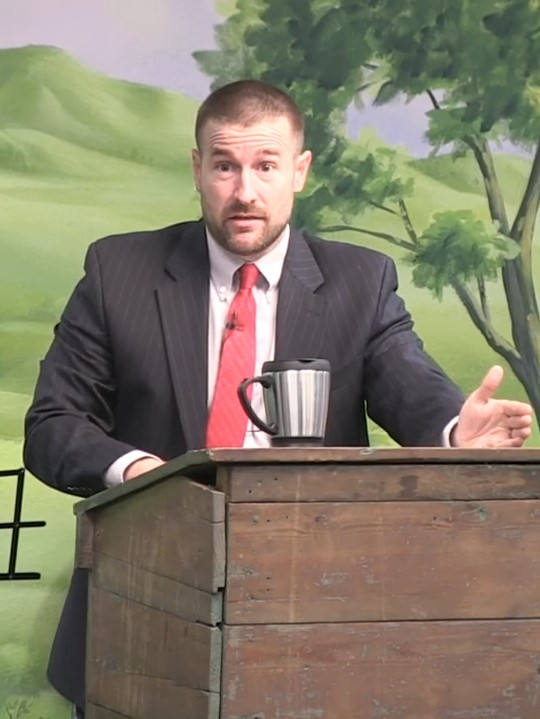
Steven L. Anderson, the founder of the New IFB movement.

A split in the New IFB occurred in January 2019 after Donnie Romero, pastor of Stedfast Baptist Church (SBC) in Fort Worth, Texas, resigned after it was revealed he had hired prostitutes, smoked marijuana, and gambled. Adam Fannin, the head pastor at SBC's satellite campus in Jacksonville, Florida, refused to acknowledge the authority of Jonathan Shelley, another New IFB pastor who took over SBC in Fort Worth following Romero's resignation. Anderson, Fannin, and Shelley traded accusations of financial wrongdoing and running a cult. Fannin was later ejected as the head pastor of the Jacksonville campus. After his ejection, Shelly preached a sermon entitled "Beware the Leven of Adam Fannin," criticizing the perceived wrongdoings of Fannin.

In 2021, the New IFB-affiliated First Works Baptist Church in El Monte, California, was bombed with an improvised explosive device. The explosion caused property damage but no injuries or deaths. First Works Baptist Church had previously been the site of protests by activists opposed to its anti-LGBTQ teachings, but police reported there was no evidence linking the protesters to the bombing.

New IFB pastor Logan Robertson was deported from Australia back to his home country of New Zealand in July 2018 after being accused of harassing Muslims at two Brisbane mosques. Robertson had previously stated that gay people should be shot and New Zealand prime minister Jacinda Ardern should "go home and get in the kitchen". Due to his deportation, Robertson's home church, Westcity Bible Baptist Church in Auckland, New Zealand, shuttered its doors and ceased operations, forcing Robertson to relocate to another New IFB church in the Philippines before resettling in New Zealand again.

In a 2021 sermon entitled "Why We Won't Shut Up," Pastor Dillon Awes advocated in a sermon that "every single homosexual" in America be lined up against a wall and shot in the back of the head. This led to calls to evict SBC from its location at a strip mall in Watauga, Texas. Cody Johnson, the landlord of the property SBC was renting, later agreed not to evict SBC from the Watauga location after communicating with SBC's legal representation.

In 2024, several of Anderson's children publicly alleged emotional and physical abuse within the family home, including routine beatings with electrical cords. The claims spread widely across social media and independent reports, leading to scrutiny of Anderson's leadership and prompting several congregations to separate from the New IFB. Notably, Stronghold Baptist Church in Norcross, Georgia—pastored by longtime ally David Berzins—announced its departure.

== Size ==
On one New IFB-affiliated website, there are listed thirteen affiliated congregations. Nine of the congregations are in five U.S. states, two are in the Canadian provinces of British Columbia and Manitoba, one is in the Filipino city of Pasig, and one is in the Australian state of Queensland. However, due to the New IFBs independent congregationalist polity, it is difficult to say for certain how many churches officially belong to the movement or espouse views that align with New IFB doctrines.

== Beliefs ==
=== Main beliefs ===
While New IFB pastors may hold differing views on small matters, the churches are united around multiple core doctrines. These include salvation by faith alone, eternal security, King James Onlyism, soul winning, hellfire preaching, and a pre-wrath Rapture. The New IFB also takes strong stances against worldliness, Calvinism, dispensationalism, liberalism, and Zionism.

In addition to its central doctrinal positions, the New IFB movement rejects a broad range of teachings and practices. They include feminism and the use of birth control, Lordship salvation theology, Scientology, Messianic Judaism and Hebrew Roots movements, Roman Catholicism, Eastern Orthodoxy, geocentric interpretations of creation, television as a medium, attendance at Bible colleges, enrollment in secular colleges and universities, modern animal-rights advocacy, and the observance of the Sabbath on Saturday.

Several New IFB pastors have also promoted doctrinal positions that depart from historic Christian orthodoxy. One pastor has taught the belief that each Person in the Trinity possesses a separate mind, will, and spiritual body. This articulation is commonly called tritheism, a view which is heretical according to historic Christian theology. In another sermon, "Nothing But the Blood," Anderson criticized the soteriological views of John MacArthur and other Protestant theologians who reject the idea that the physical body of Christ itself possesses divine attributes. This articulation is commonly called monophysitism, another view which is heretical according to historic Christian theology.

The movement also teaches the belief that Jesus experienced punitive suffering during the Harrowing of Hell as part of the atonement, and it also teaches the belief that a verbal or silent recitation of the Sinner's Prayer is a necessary requisite for an individual's salvation.

Additionally, the New IFB movement has argued that the Christian Flag represents the religion of the Antichrist.

They follow Young Earth creationism, though not the Ussher Chronology of 4004 B.C as the date for the creation of the world, but rather Steven's own calculations, which place the creation of the earth at 4234 B.C

=== Ecclesiology ===
The New IFB movement teaches the belief that the Bible prohibits the observance of the Eucharist in corporate church services, According to the New IFB movement, communion should be privately practiced within homes. The movement also rejects the doctrine of a universal church composed of all believers, affirming instead that only local, like-minded Baptist congregations constitute legitimate New Testament churches. This viewpoint contributes to a strongly exclusivist posture.

New IFB leaders believe that Baptists who share their specific theological distinctives are the only Christians who represent an unbroken line of apostolic succession, because in their view, other Christian traditions were invented by what they believe was a corrupt ecclesiastical system which originated during the rule of Constantine the Great. According to the theology of the New IFB movement, even individuals who are considered "saved" but who belong to non-Baptist churches should be shunned because they "walk not after the tradition which he received of us." Consistent with this stance, the New IFB rejects the major historical creeds of Christianity, such as the Apostles' Creed and the Nicene Creed, regarding them as incompatible with their understanding of biblical authority.

Although New IFB websites and promotional materials emphasize the independence of each affiliated congregation, critics of the movement (including former members) have alleged that Anderson exercises a substantial amount of informal control over the broader network and he has removed individuals from the fellowship in response to relatively minor disagreements.

=== Anti-Judaism, antisemitism and anti-Zionism ===
The New IFB movement has been characterized as promoting an antisemitic ideology by multiple scholars, journalists, and watchdog organizations. The ADL has explicitly described the movement and several leaders of it as antisemitic, citing their doctrinal positions and their public rhetoric as evidence. Anderson has delivered numerous sermons in which he has made hostile statements about Jewish people and Judaism.

A recurring theme in Anderson's preaching is his opposition to the use of the Hebrew language and the use of Hebraized forms of the name "Jesus" (such as Yeshua). Anderson argues that employing a Hebrew-language name is inherently deceptive and he also claims that individuals who prefer to use such terminology are "not saved" because they are attempting to "turn Christians into Jews."

The New IFB movement's theology rejects Christian Zionism in accordance with the belief that the modern State of Israel is a "Satanic fraud" rather than a fulfillment of biblical prophecy. According to the movement's theology, Christians constitute the true "chosen people" of God. This position is often accompanied by assertions that unbelieving Jews have been spiritually "cut off" and as a result, they possess no special covenantal relationship with God outside of individual salvation through Christ. Anderson has also produced several videos and online documentaries in which he has denounced Judaism as a religion. These productions include conspiracy theories such as explicit Holocaust denial and the claim that Jewish people possess a unique spiritual affinity with Satan that differentiates them from other unbelieving groups.

=== Homosexuality, transgenderism, and capital punishment ===
The New IFB movement strongly opposes homosexuality, teaching the belief that individuals become homosexual as a consequence of rejecting and "hating" God and it asserts that as punishment for this sin, such individuals are "reprobates" who can no longer receive justification or salvation. As a result, New IFB pastors frequently argue that civil governments should enforce Old Testament penal codes regarding homosexuality, including capital punishment.

Anderson and other New IFB leaders have repeatedly praised the 2016 Pulse nightclub shooting, a terrorist attack in which an attacker murdered 49 people and injured 53 others at a queer nightclub in Orlando, Florida. On the third anniversary of the Pulse shooting, the New IFB organized the "Make America Straight Again" conference, hosted by a New IFB-affiliated church in the Orlando area.

In June 2019, Grayson Fritts, the pastor of All Scripture Baptist Church in Knoxville, Tennessee, and a former detective with the Knox County Sheriff's Office, delivered a sermon in which he called for the execution of gay people, citing biblical law as a justification for it.

Anderson has repeatedly expressed animosity toward transgender public figures and more broadly, he has expressed animosity toward transgender identity. In a sermon entitled "Six Types of Prayer," Anderson stated that he prayed that Caitlyn Jenner's heart would "explode."

== See also ==
- Anti-Catholicism
- Antifeminism
- Anti-Judaism
- Antisemitism in Christianity
- Biblical patriarchy
- Christian fundamentalism
- Christianity and homosexuality
- Christianity and Judaism
- Christianity and other religions
- Christianity and violence
- Christian reconstructionism
- Christian right
- Dominion theology
- List of Baptist denominations
- List of organizations designated by the Southern Poverty Law Center as anti-LGBTQ hate groups
- Supersessionism
- Theonomy
- Women in Christianity
