= Pamela Waechter =

Jewish-American communal leader

- Born: December 8, 1947; Minneapolis, Minnesota
- Died: July 28, 2006 (aged 58); Seattle, Washington
- Children: 2 children

Pamela Waechter (December 8, 1947 – July 28, 2006) was a Jewish-American communal leader. She was the sole fatality of the 2006 Seattle Jewish Federation shooting, among the total of six women who were shot.

== Personal life ==
Born and raised in Minneapolis in a Lutheran family, Waechter converted to Judaism in the mid-1960s when she married her husband Bill. She and her husband moved to Seattle in 1979. The couple later divorced. Waechter was a member of Temple B'nai Torah, a Reform congregation, from the 1970s until her death.

== Career ==
Waechter was a graduate of the University of Washington, earning a degree in nutrition in 1985. She served a role in many community organizations, including the President of Temple B'nai Torah, Regional Officer of the Reform Movement, an early organizer and supporter for the Jewish Family Service's Food Bank, and a cook for a local women's shelter. She served the Seattle Jewish Federation in multiple capacities over the years, including serving as Director of Outreach, Event Coordinator, and Director of Annual Giving.

== Murder ==
On July 28, 2006, an antisemitic extremist named Naveed Afzal Haq entered the Jewish Federation of Seattle building and proceeded to shoot six women. Waechter received a gunshot to the chest. As the wounded Waechter attempted to flee down a flight of stairs, Haq reached over the railing and shot her for the second time in the head, killing her.

== Legacy ==
In 2007 the Seattle Jewish Federation established the Pamela Waechter z"l Jewish Communal Professional Award in her honor, an award that honors "a professional at a Jewish organization who embodies the qualities of leadership and service that Pamela Waechter z"l brought to Jewish Puget Sound."
