= Approaches to evangelism =

Christian approaches

Christians have used many different approaches to spread Christianity via the practice of evangelism. Christianity began with only a few different evangelistic approaches, but over the years, many different forms of evangelism have been employed by various groups to spread their faith. Many of these forms of evangelism are often employed in only certain parts of the world by Christians in different geographical areas. In particular, most new approaches to evangelism today have arisen out of Europe or the United States, especially when new technologies are used for the effort of evangelism.

== Open-air preaching ==
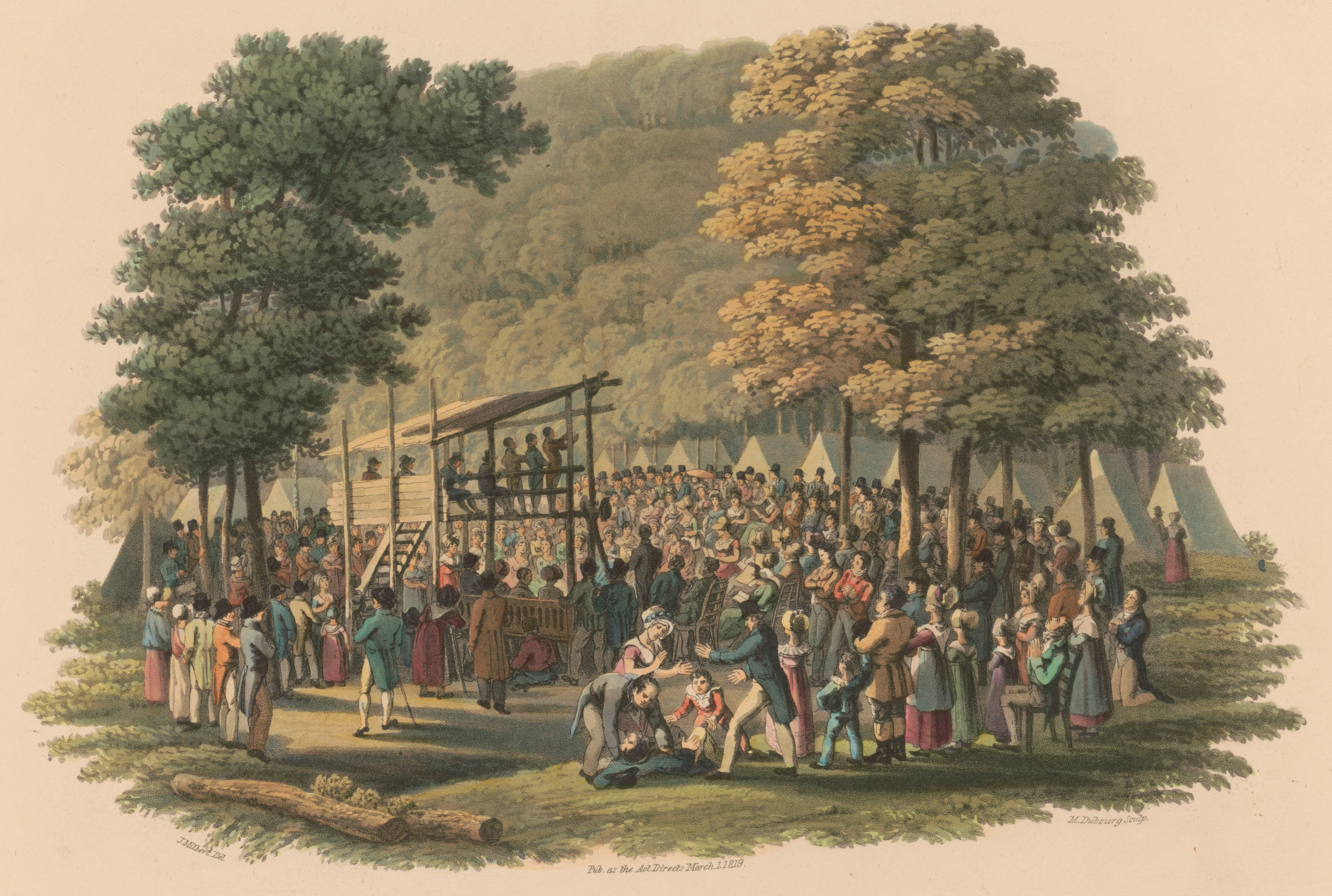
Methodist preachers are known for promulgating the doctrines of the new birth and entire sanctification to the public at events such as tent revivals and camp meetings, which they believe is the reason that God raised them up into existence.

Open-air preaching is an approach to evangelism characterized by speaking in public places out in the open, generally to crowds of people at a time, using a message, sermon, or speech which spreads the gospel. Supporters of this approach note that both Jesus and many of the Old Testament prophets often preached about God in public places. It is one of the oldest approaches to evangelism.

During Protestant Reformation, open-air preaching was often employed by Protestants throughout Europe who could not always preach inside churches, which were mostly Catholic. Open-air preaching in Europe continued during the rise of Puritanism and other Protestant movements. It was often used in Pastoral environments as well as in cities, the former sometimes due to a desire to avoid the authorities, and the latter because, for one reason, it could reach eccentric people living in cities who would not otherwise hear the gospel.

In the time period of the late 19th century and early-to-mid-20th century many famous open-air preachers in the United States began to preach, such as Billy Sunday and Billy Graham. Graham in particular used a combination of open-air preaching and the recent advent of televangelism to broadcast his sermons, which often took place in large venues such as stadiums, to large portions of the world and millions of Americans.

Early Methodist preachers John Wesley and George Whitefield preached in the open air, which allowed them to attract crowds larger than most buildings could accommodate. Wesley declared, "I am well assured that I did far more good to my Lincolnshire parishioners by preaching three days on my father's tomb than I did by preaching three years in his pulpit ... To this day field preaching is a cross to me, but I know my commission and see no other way of preaching the gospel to every creature."

== Trickle-down evangelism ==
Trickle-down evangelism is an approach to evangelism primarily concerned with converting high-ranking members of a society, so that their influence can serve to help spread Christianity throughout the society in question. It was practiced especially often during the Middle Ages.

Trickle-down evangelism was practiced throughout China multiple times during the Middle Ages, with examples such as converted or sympathetic officials helping the Jesuits or other parts of the Catholic church spread, or the expedition of Marco Polo resulting in the Mongol ruler of China Kublai Khan inviting the Pope to send "teachers of science and religion" to China.

Trickle-down evangelism was also applied often in European areas during ancient times, such as in the northern Sweden area, as the Catholic Church tried to send missionaries into the area.

== Door-to-door evangelism ==
The Bible records that Jesus sent out his disciples to evangelize by visiting peoples homes in pairs of two believers (cf. Luke 10:1–12). In the same text, Jesus mentioned that few people were willing to evangelize, despite there being many people who would be receptive to his Gospel message. As such, door-to-door preaching is an approach to evangelism where a Christian will go from household to household in a certain area to evangelize to residents, often in conjunction with passing out gospel tracts. Jesus often went into other people's homes during his own ministry, and according to The Encyclopedia of Protestantism, it is a very important approach to evangelism.

One of the first modern large-scale uses of door-to-door preaching was when the Oriental Mission Society attempted to visit the homes of an entire nation, by visiting 10.3 million homes in Japan from 1912 to 1917. The international organization Every Home for Christ began door-to-door preaching in 1953 throughout many countries, and as of 2010, total home visits by their members became 1.3 billion. Many local parishes and churches worldwide use this approach to evangelism. Methodist churches aligned with the holiness movement engage in door to door evangelism and in this tradition, it is frequently referred to as "calling".

Groups such as Jehovah's Witnesses and members of the LDS movement are famous in particular for spreading their beliefs by door to door evangelism at people's homes, often in pairs or small groups. Both groups' main organizations use door-to-door preaching to a great extent. Full-time missionaries of the Church of Jesus Christ of Latter-day Saints use this, and other techniques, to find people to teach.

== Ashes to Go evangelism on Ash Wednesday ==
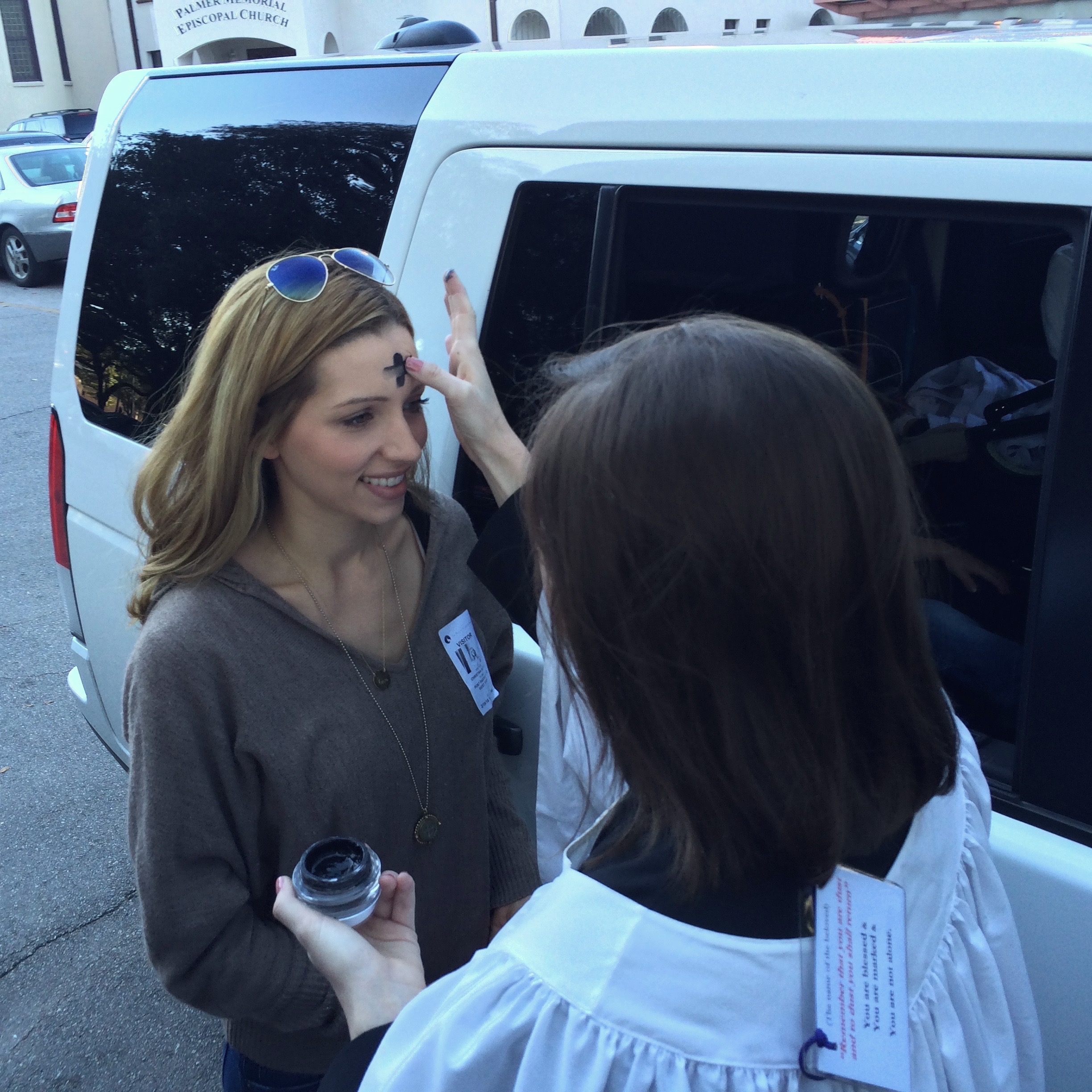
On Ash Wednesday, the first day in the Christian penitential season of Lent, an Anglican acolyte offers Ashes to Go to passerby.

Since 2007, some members of major Christian Churches in the United States, including Lutherans, Catholics, Anglicans and Methodists among others, have participated in 'Ashes to Go' activities, in which clergy go outside of their churches to public places, such as city centres, sidewalks and railroad stations, to distribute ashes to people on Ash Wednesday, the first day of Lent, the penitential season in the Christian liturgical calendar. The Anglican priest Emily Mellott of Calvary Church in Lombard took up the idea and turned it into a movement, stated that the practice was an act of evangelism. Anglicans and Catholics in parts of the United Kingdom such as Sunderland, are offering Ashes to Go together: Marc Lyden-Smith, the priest of Saint Mary's Church, stated that the ecumenical effort is a "tremendous witness in our city, with Catholics and Anglicans working together to start the season of Lent, perhaps reminding those who have fallen away from the Church, or have never been before, that the Christian faith is alive and active in Sunderland." The Catholic Student Association of Kent State University, based at the University Parish Newman Center, offered ashes to university students who were going through the Student Center of that institution in 2012, and Douglas Clark of St. Matthew's Roman Catholic Church in Statesboro, among others, have participated in Ashes to Go. On Ash Wednesday 2017, Father Paddy Mooney, the priest of St Patrick's Roman Catholic Church in the Irish town of Glenamaddy, set up an Ashes to Go station through which commuters could drive and receive ashes from their car; the parish church also had "drive-through prayers during Lent with people submitting requests into a box left in the church grounds without having to leave their car". Reverend Trey Hall, pastor of Urban Village United Methodist Church, stated that when his local church offered ashes in Chicago "nearly 300 people received ashes – including two people who were waiting in their car for a stoplight to change." In 2013, churches not only in the United States, but also at least one church each in the United Kingdom, Canada and South Africa, participated in Ashes to Go. Outside of their church building, Saint Stephen Martyr Lutheran Church in Canton offered Ashes to Go for "believers whose schedules make it difficult to attend a traditional service" in 2016. In the United States itself 34 states and the District of Columbia had at least one church taking part. Most of these churches (parishes) were Protestant Episcopal, but there were also several Methodist churches, as well as Presbyterian and Catholic churches.

== Evangelizing through a sermon ==
Many churches regularly have a gospel message preached in a sermon. Often, this will include an altar call where people are invited to come forward to the chancel rails or mourner's bench and accept Christ; the tradition of altar calls is practiced by many evangelical denominations such as the Methodist and Baptist Churches.

Many Reformed Christians object to it on the grounds that they believe it creates false conversions.

== Lifestyle evangelism ==
Lifestyle evangelism is an approach to evangelism characterized by someone demonstrating their faith by their actions in the hope that people around them will be impressed with how God affects that person's life, and become a Christian. According to The Encyclopedia of Protestantism printed in 2004, approximately 100 million people use this approach to evangelism.

Supporters of this approach to evangelism often cite Matthew 5:16 as a proof verse. Supporters also often point out that Jesus drew people to God by showing them kindness and performing good deeds, while detractors sometimes note that people may not realize one's good behavior is due to Christianity. Supporters claim this is more effective than direct evangelism because of the perception that it is harder to live "righteously" than to preach a sermon.

== Friendship evangelism ==
Similar to lifestyle evangelism, friendship evangelism is an approach to evangelism characterized by Christians developing relationships with people in order to show them kindness and talk to them about God eventually. Supporters sometimes say that Jesus related to those who took an interest in him as friends, or that it is more effective than other methods of evangelism which are seen as less personal. This approach is also known as "loving someone into the kingdom". Opponents hold that friendship evangelism contrasts with the approach of Jesus, Paul and the apostles towards preaching the gospel. Missionary dating takes this a step further and Flirty Fishing takes it to an extreme.

== Child evangelism ==
The child evangelism movement is a Christian evangelism movement that was begun in the 20th century. It focuses on the 4/14 Window which centers on evangelizing children between the ages of 4 and 14 years old.

== Creative evangelism ==
This approach to evangelism is where the creative arts (such as music, visual art, drama, film) are used to present a gospel message. Examples include Wendy Alec's novel "The Fall of Lucifer", Christian rock band Delirious? and Johann Sebastian Bach's musical composition "Matthäuspassion" (Saint Matthew Passion). However, some ministries refer to this kind of evangelism as simply the practice of finding creative ways to evangelize.

One of the most famous examples of creative evangelism is George Handel's oratio, "Messiah", written in 1741. It is the most performed major choral work in history, has been tied to the revival of the Church of England and to influencing famous evangelist John Wesley's theology concerning Eternal security, and in modern times, has around four million viewers per year.

Campus Crusade for Christ, an evangelical Christian association with branches in a multitude of countries, owns the distribution rights for a movie called "Jesus Film", a presentation of the life of Jesus Christ. This movie, which has been translated into 80 languages, has been viewed by about 850 million people.

In the Church of Pakistan, the Diocese of Hyderabad uses this approach to evangelism among tribal groups in areas of Pakistan which have a high population of Sindhis.

== Using Gospel tracts ==
A gospel tract in the Christian sense is a leaflet with a gospel message. It is typically a short presentation of the Gospel lasting only a few pages, and is typically printed on small pieces of paper. Estimated numbers of tracts distributed in the year 2000 amount to around 5 billion. It is often used in conjunction with street preaching or door to door preaching. As an approach to evangelism, many modern evangelists attest to the usefulness of gospel tracts to spread the gospel.

== Televangelism ==
Televangelism is an approach to evangelism characterized by an evangelistic message presented through the medium of television, often through a charismatic sermon. Large Christian television networks such as the Catholic broadcasting channel EWTN or the Protestant televangelism channel Trinity Broadcasting Network feature many televangelist preachers.

Televangelism was started in the United States and Canada in the mid-20th century, as a primarily evangelical Protestant approach to evangelism. It made Christian viewpoints much more visible in the world at the time than they were before.

== Radio evangelism ==
Radio evangelism is an approach to evangelism which began around 1921, and has reached more people per hour than any other kind of evangelism, according to The Encyclopedia of Protestantism. It is the usage of radio broadcasts to evangelize to listeners, sometimes worldwide in one broadcast.

Maria Miranda, the most listened to radio evangelist from Latin America in 1990, was heard by over 100 million people per day through 537 radio stations in 22 countries during that time. In Yemen, a country in which 97 percent of the country is listed as Muslim, 10 percent of the population listens to Christian radio. The Lutheran Church–Missouri Synod has had a radio station on KFUO called "The Lutheran Hour" since 1925, had 5 million listeners by 1931, and broadcast in over 31 languages with 40 million listeners in 1987. The first missionary specific radio station, HCJB, went on the air in Ecuador on December 25, 1931.

== Internet evangelism ==
Internet evangelism is a form of evangelism where the Christian gospel is presented on the Internet. This may include a website presenting apologetics about biblical innerrancy, social media church services, someone discussing their faith in a chat room, evangelical messages or advertisements on the home pages of Christian organizations, or other methods of using the Internet to spread Christianity.

In the United States, the Internet Evangelism Coalition, set up by the Billy Graham Center in 1999, initiated Internet Evangelism Day on the last Sunday of April every year.

In their Pew Internet and American Life Project, the Pew Research Center found that "Nearly two-thirds of online Americans use the Internet for faith-related reasons. The sixty-four percent of Internet users who perform spiritual and religious activities online represent nearly eighty-two million Americans".

Among the most popular and important spiritually related online activities:

- Thirty-eight percent of the nation's 128 million Internet users have sent and received email with spiritual content.
- Thirty-five percent have sent or received online greeting cards related to religious holidays.
- Thirty-two percent have gone online to read news accounts of religious events and affairs.
- Twenty-one percent have sought information about how to celebrate religious holidays.
- Seventeen percent have looked for information about where they could attend religious services.
- Seven percent have made or responded to online prayer requests.
- Seven percent have made donations to religious organizations or charities.

== Phone evangelism ==
This approach to evangelism involves using phones to contact people in order to spread the gospel to them. This sometimes takes the form of random phone calls, or is done after someone contacts the evangelist to recommend people to whom a person may want the evangelist to evangelize. The huge growth in cell phones and other mobile devices is opening up the way for new and creative methods of evangelism.

== Personal evangelism ==
Sometimes referred to as "one to one" or "personal work", this approach to evangelism is when one Christian evangelizes to, typically, one non-Christian, or only a few non-Christians, in a private manner. A 1982 Gallup Poll revealed that 51 percent of all Americans had tried to convince someone to become a Christian during their life.

== Creation evangelism ==
Not to be confused with creative evangelism, creation evangelism uses the truths of modern science to try and demonstrate the scientific accuracy of events described in the Bible, usually those found in Genesis. The evangelist may influence a listener to believe in the existence of God and His certain judgment described in the Bible; eventually leading the person to become saved through Jesus Christ.

== Archaeology evangelism ==
Used with considerable success by groups such as Seventh-day Adventists and Christadelphians, practitioners use archaeological discoveries to demonstrate the historical and prophetic reliability of the Bible. The ready availability of archaeological programs on radio and television has made this approach less popular and effective than in earlier years. At one time this approach drew large crowds to London's New Gallery Theatre and the Opera House in Sydney with David Down, as well as many less prestigious venues such as halls and churches.

== Prophetic evangelism ==
A method employed mainly by charismatic Christians. This is where (as its practitioners believe) God speaks through a Christian to a non-believer to say something that will prompt that person to seek God. On most occasions it is something that the speaker could not have known naturally; for example, someone who is having a secret affair may be told that God knows they are doing wrong and wants them to change their ways.

However, some critics of this approach note that other religions appear to use a similar method to spread their faith.

=== Treasure hunts ===
So called treasure hunts are a type of prophetic evangelism. A small group of Christians takes time to pray and listen to revelation from the Holy Spirit about people God wants the group to find. There is a close correlation to personal evangelism. This type of evangelism may be referred to as a game of searching for God's treasures, which are people. The group typically receives revelation, or "clues", consisting of places, clothing, hairstyle, or situations which will help identify the "treasure".

After receiving these revelations, the group goes out and looks for the people identified by the clues. Sometimes they are able to speak God's love and the Gospel of Jesus Christ into somebody's life. On other occasions the group prays for the person's healing or other needs.

The main focus in this type of evangelism is to let people know that they are valuable to God and that God is searching for them as his treasure.

== Use of props ==
Various props may serve as visual aids to accompany the verbal explanation of the Gospel message in many of the above approaches. Such props include variations on the Wordless Book, commercial products such as the eCube, and specialized flannelgraph or flip chart sets.
