= Gaza war protests at Columbia University =

- Part of Gaza war protests (in the US • at universities (in 2024 (in the US)))
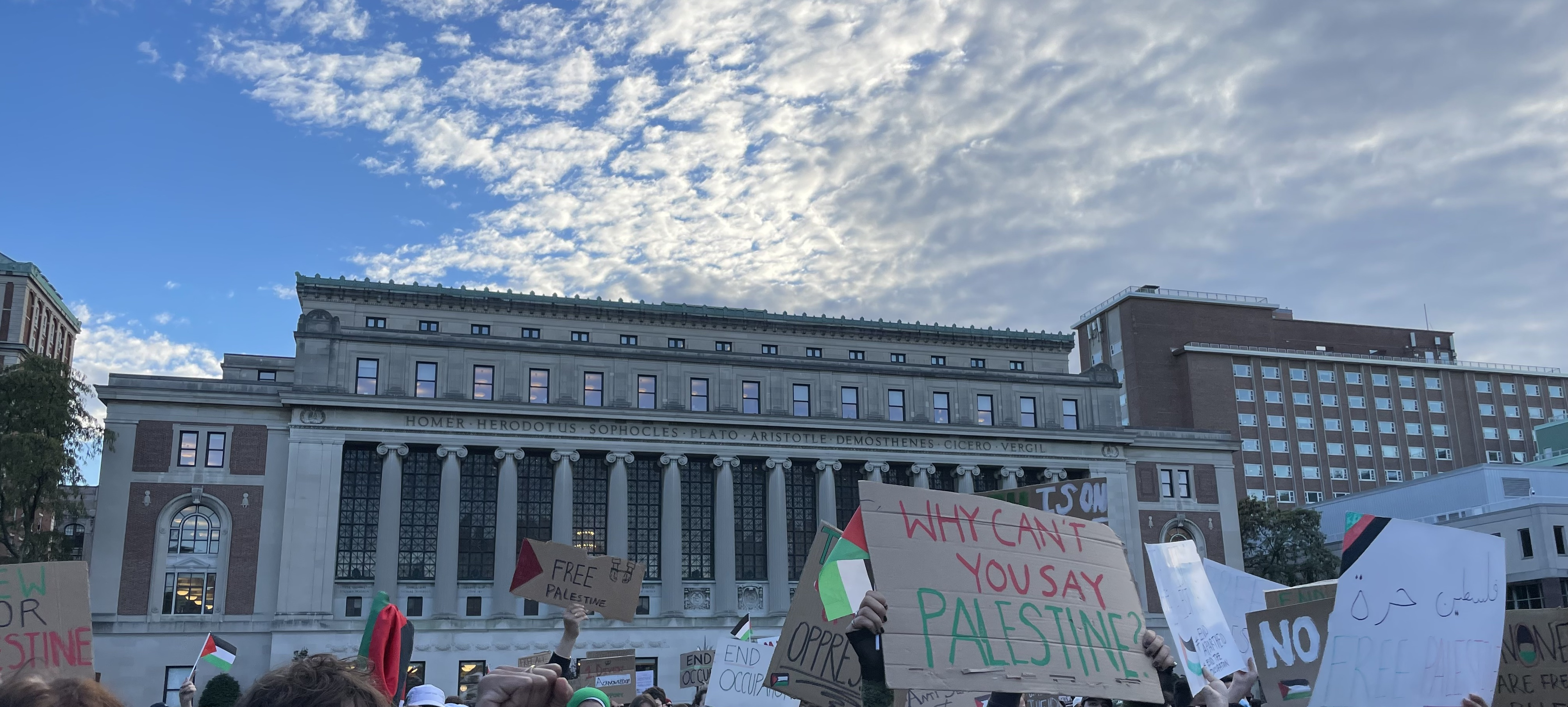
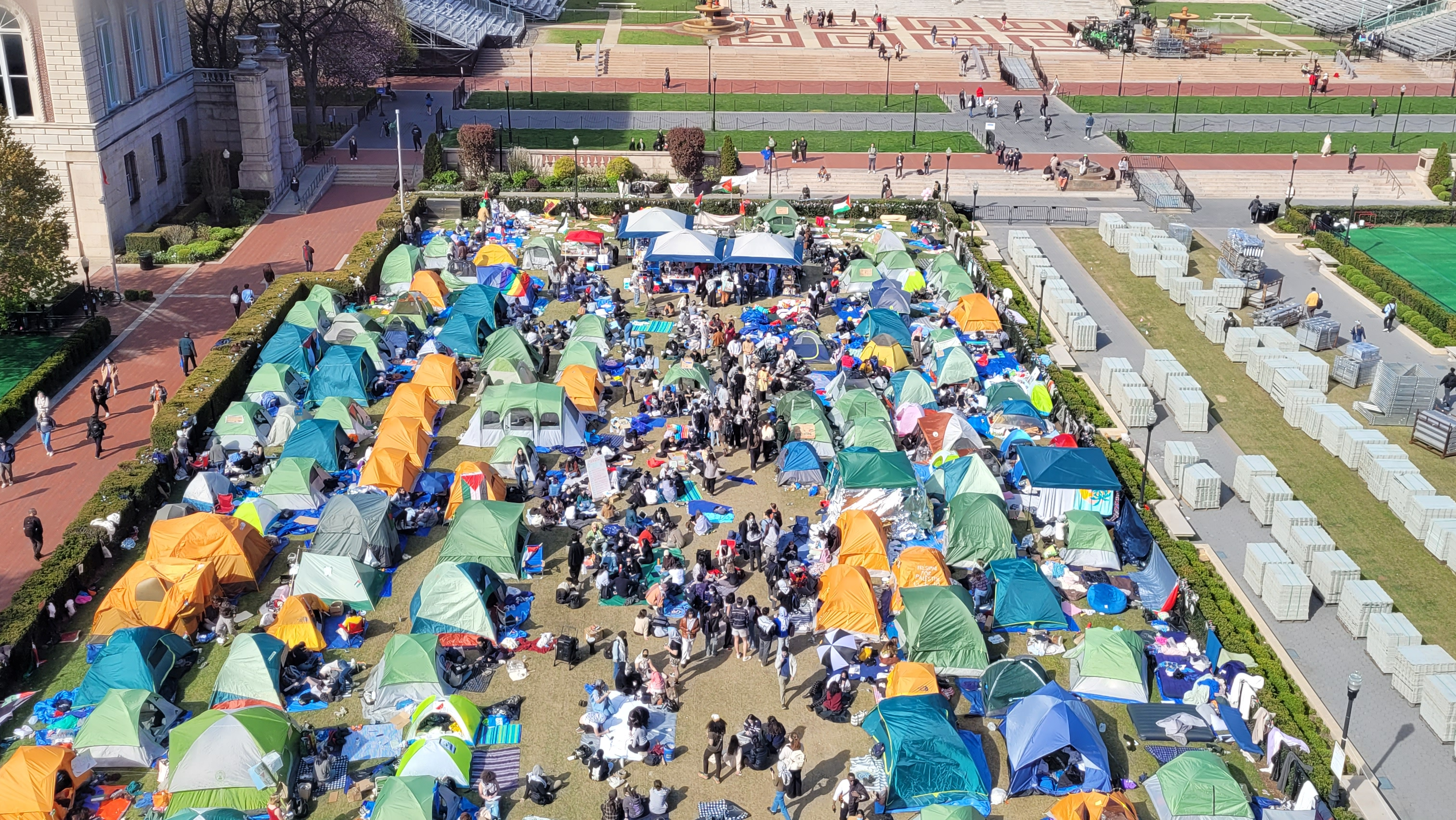
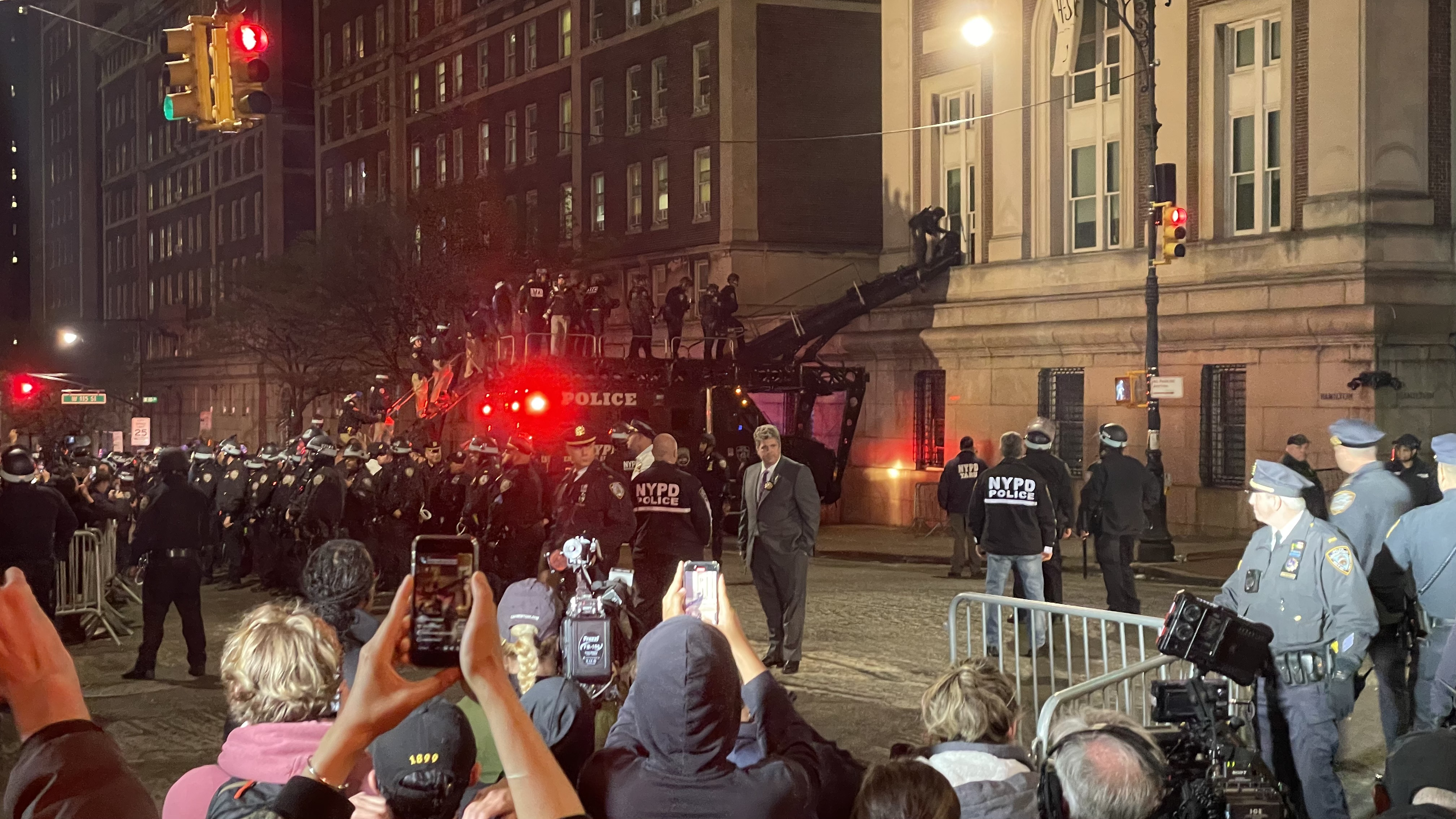
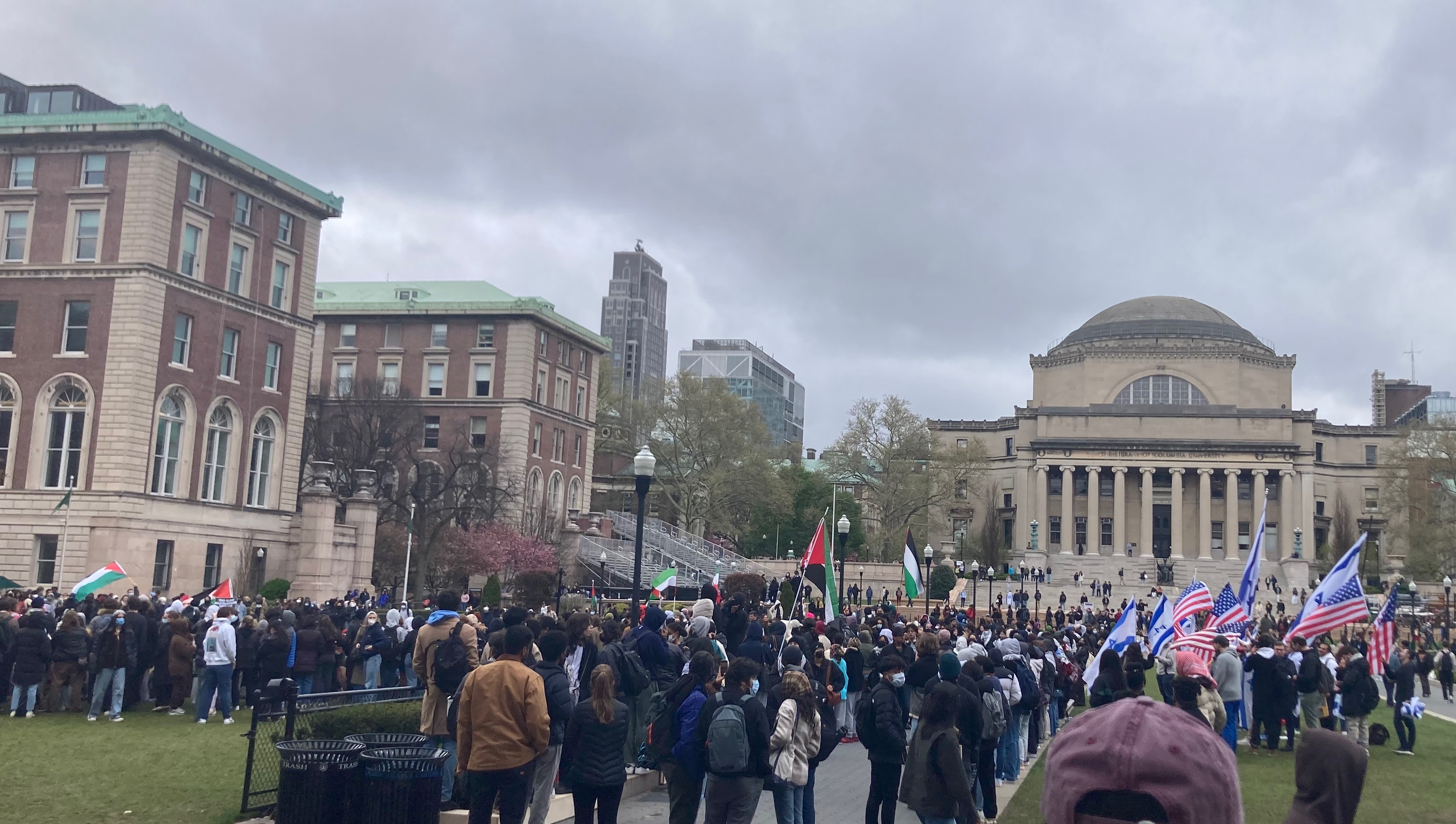
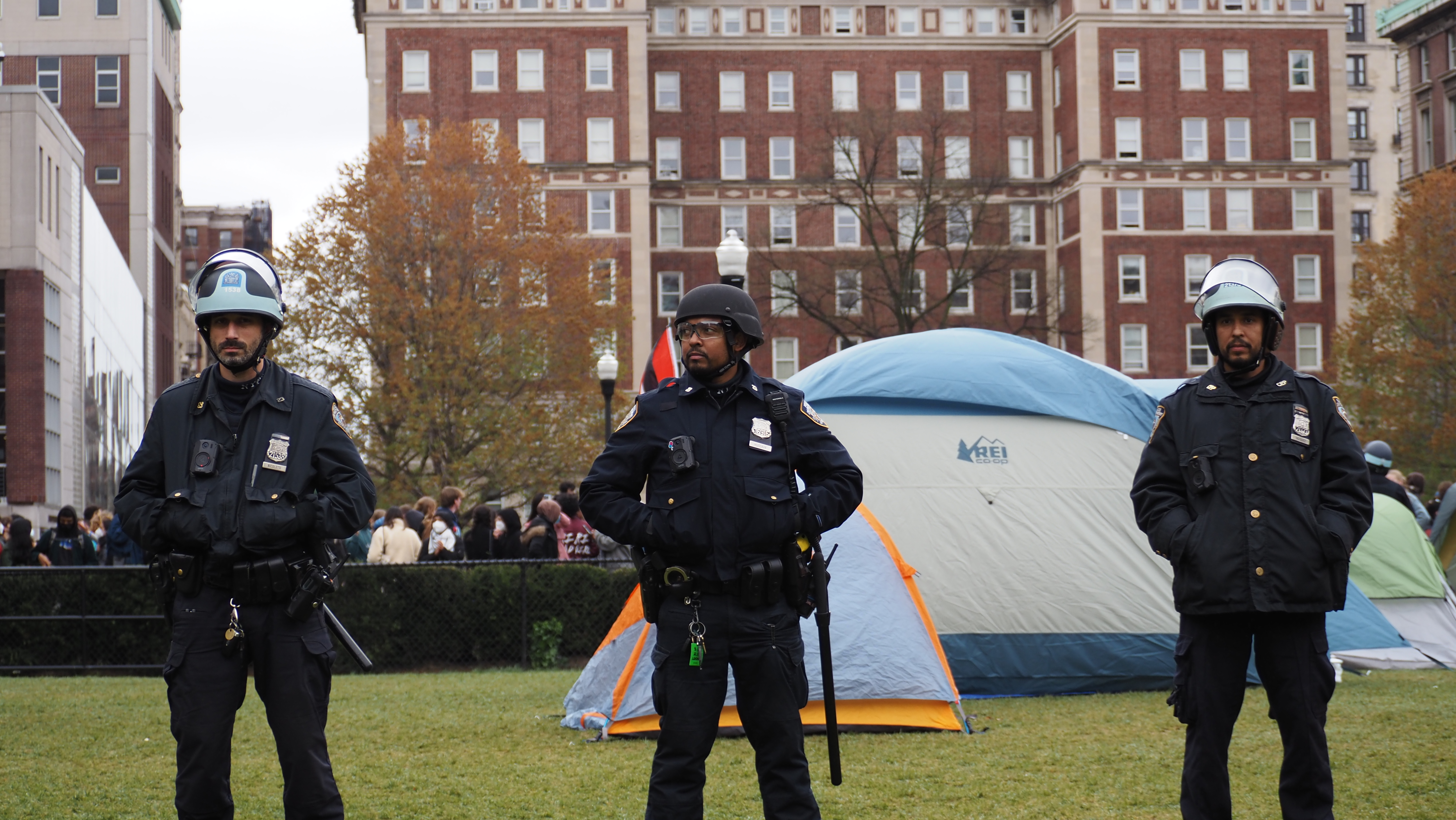
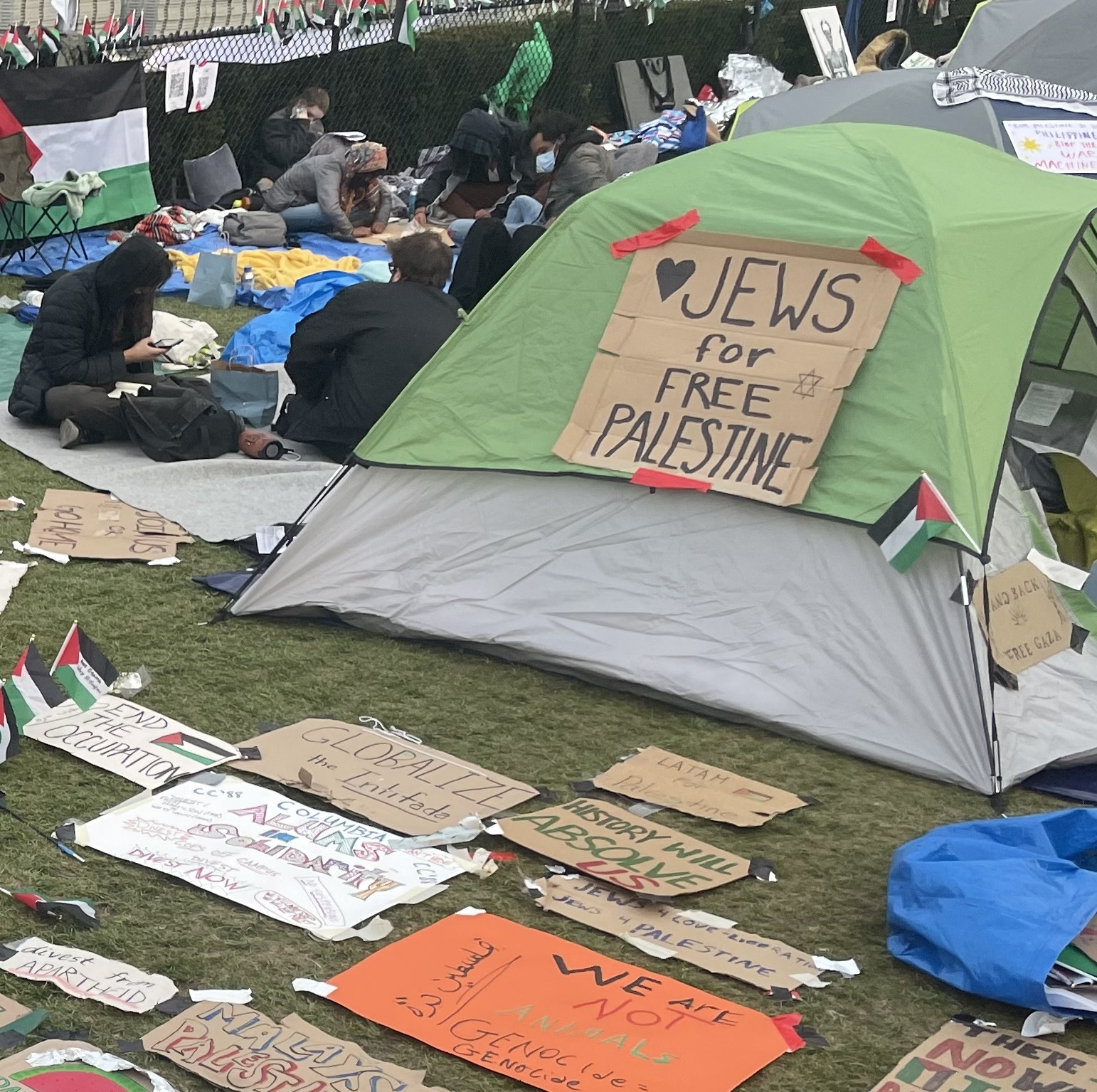
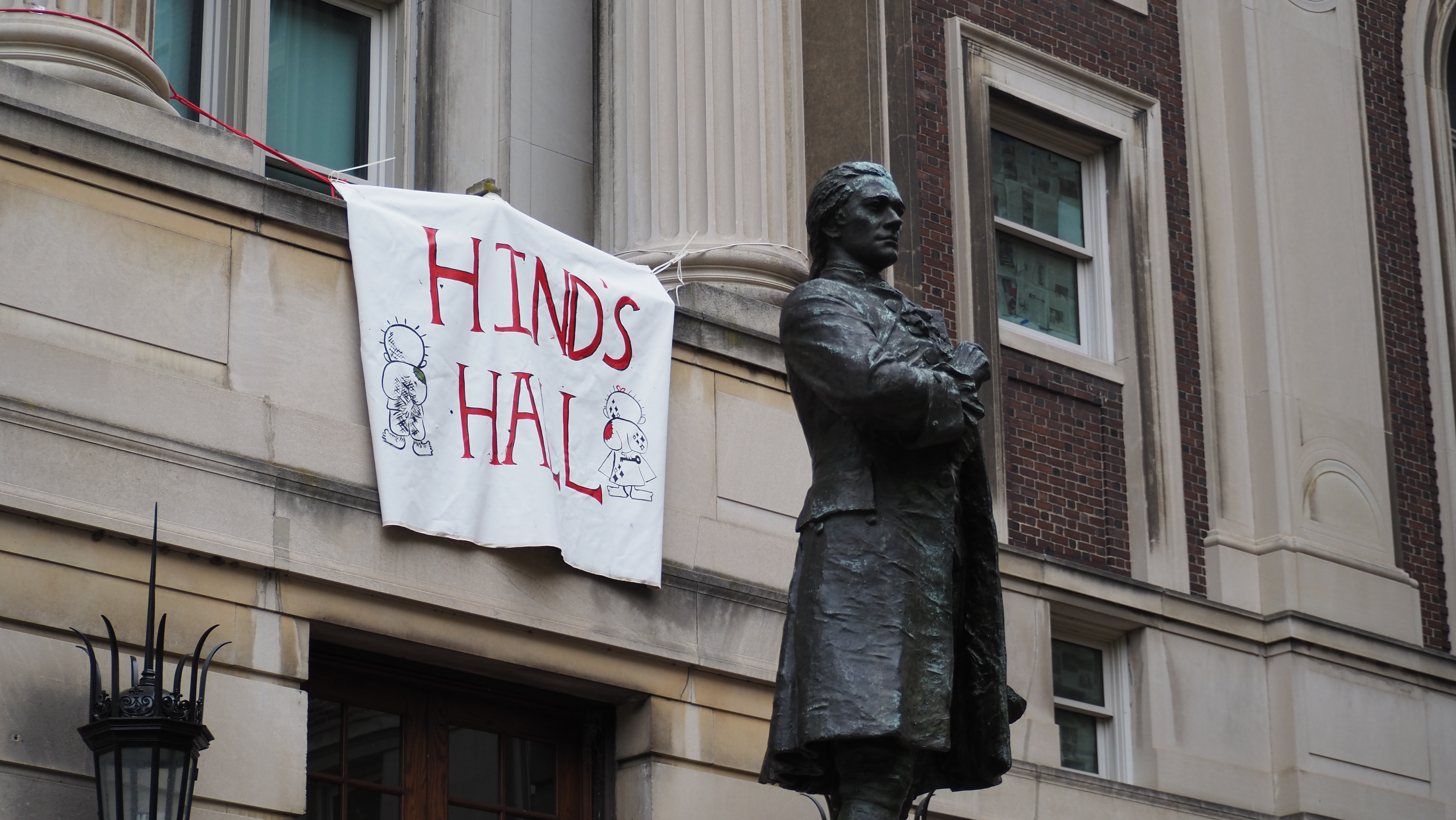
- Date: October 9, 2023 – present

During the Gaza war and genocide, Columbia University in New York City has been the site of student activism—including a series of protests, encampments, and occupations—in solidarity with the Palestinians of Gaza and against what student protesters have called the university's complicity in the genocide. The main demand of the Gaza solidarity protest movement at Columbia was that the university disinvest from Israel. The university's administration and the federal government have sought to repress the protests, which they have called antisemitic. In 2025, the university became a focus of President Donald Trump, whose administration, citing what it called widespread antisemitism at Columbia, cut $400 million in funding to Columbia and issued a list of demands, detained and attempted to deport Mahmoud Khalil and Mohsen Mahdawi, and investigated Columbia for Title VI violations. In a settlement with the Trump administration, the Trustees of Columbia University agreed to pay over $200 million, adopt the IHRA definition of antisemitism, and accept other demands.

That protest, jointly organized by Columbia's chapters of Students for Justice in Palestine (SJP) and Jewish Voice for Peace (JVP), demanded that Columbia address Palestinian humanity, disinvest from Israel, cancel the CU Tel Aviv Global Center, and stop the dual degree program with Tel Aviv University. Columbia's administration adjusted its protest policies and, on November 10, suspended SJP and JVP for organizing an "unauthorized" walkout. At a November 14 rally, a coalition of 80+ student groups was announced as Columbia University Apartheid Divest (CUAD), which continued to organize protest activity with six demands, including that Columbia institutionally call for an immediate ceasefire, divestment from companies profiting from Israeli apartheid, and end its vilification of pro-Palestinian activism.

On April 17, 2024, Columbia students established the Gaza Solidarity Encampment on the East Butler Lawn. The next day, Columbia President Minouche Shafik called in the New York City Police Department (NYPD) to arrest them en masse—the first time Columbia allowed police to suppress campus protests since the 1968 demonstrations against the Vietnam War. Shortly after the mass arrest and dismantling of the initial camp, other students autonomously occupied the adjacent lawn and established another encampment there, holding it for several days as students negotiated with the administration. The Columbia encampments encouraged other actions at multiple universities and led to the proliferation of Palestine solidarity encampments at over 180 universities around the world.

On April 29, after Shafik announced the end of negotiations and said Columbia "will not divest from Israel", protesters occupied Hamilton Hall, calling it Hind's Hall in honor of Hind Rajab. After less than 24 hours, the NYPD was summoned again. Hundreds of NYPD officers broke into and cleared the hall, arrested more than 100 protesters, and fully dismantled the camp. On May 31, a third campus encampment was briefly established in response to an alumni reunion.

When Shafik announced her resignation as president on August 14, 2024, Katrina Armstrong, then CEO of the Columbia University Irving Medical Center and dean of the Columbia University College of Physicians and Surgeons, became interim president. After the Trump administration's $400 million funding cut, Armstrong stepped down and Claire Shipman, then co-chair of the board of trustees, became acting president. Shortly thereafter, Shipman announced a review of the Columbia University Senate.

Several allegations of antisemitic incidents were made with regard to the protests. Organizers repeatedly denounced antisemitism and affirmed that there was no room for it or "any form of racism" in the movement. Columbia affiliates, including Jewish students and professors, challenged attempts to characterize Palestine solidarity at Columbia as antisemitic—including characterizations and pronouncements made by the federal government and Columbia's Task Force on Antisemitism—describing such attempts as conflating opposition to Zionism with antisemitism and exploiting the accusation of antisemitism to repress Palestine solidarity as well as academic freedom and freedom of expression.

== Background ==
=== Student activism at Columbia University ===
There is a storied history of student activism associated with Columbia University, for which it has sometimes been called the "activist Ivy". The Morningside campus saw protest occupations and disciplinary sanctions in 1968, 1972, 1985, 1987, 1996, and 2019, but the mass arrests on April 18, 2024, were the first time since 1968 that Columbia allowed police onto campus to arrest student protesters. The Gaza war protests were also preceded by the 2021–2022 graduate student labor strike led by Graduate Workers of Columbia–United Auto Workers Local 2110 (SWC–UAW).

=== Israeli–Palestinian conflict at Columbia ===
Columbia has been the site of disagreement relating to the Israeli–Palestinian conflict for decades, with prominent Palestinian-American scholars on the faculty including Edward Said and Rashid Khalidi on one side and pro-Israel trustees, donors, alumni, and faculty members who objected to their scholarship on the other.

There had been previous proposals for Columbia to divest from Israel. In October 2002, during the Second Intifada, the Columbia/Barnard Faculty Committee on Divestment released a petition for Columbia to divest from companies that it said manufacture arms for or sell arms to Israel, specifically Boeing, General Electric, Caterpillar, and Lockheed Martin, for a total withdrawal of $8,118,225 in investments. Rabbi Charles Sheer, director of the Columbia-Barnard chapter of Hillel, led a campaign in 2003 against the divestment proposal that gathered 33,000 signatures in support. The petition did not pass.

=== 2023 at Columbia University ===
In April 2023, Columbia announced plans to establish a global center in Tel Aviv, drawing strong faculty rebuke.

The investiture ceremony for Minouche Shafik as president of Columbia University took place on October 4, 2023. Shafik, Columbia's first woman leader, succeeded First Amendment scholar Lee Bollinger, who had served as president since 2002.

== Involved parties ==
=== Pro-Palestinian protest groups ===
==== Students for Justice in Palestine (SJP) and Jewish Voice for Peace (JVP) ====
On October 9, 2023, Students for Justice in Palestine (SJP) and Jewish Voice for Peace (JVP) published a Statement of Solidarity that called for the first protest, on October 12.

On November 10, Columbia senior administrator Gerald Rosberg announced the suspension of SJP and JVP, citing a violation of university rules after an "unauthorized event": a student walkout and die-in on November 9. The suspension came after senior administrators had quietly revised policies cited in the suspension on October 24, adding a new section to the University Event Policy webpage that asserted the administration's right to "regulate the time, place and manner of certain forms of public expression" without input from the Columbia University Senate.

==== Columbia University Apartheid Divest (CUAD) ====
The formation of Columbia University Apartheid Divest (CUAD), a coalition of 80+ student groups, was announced on November 14, 2023, four days after the university banned chapters of Students for Justice in Palestine (SJP) and Jewish Voice for Peace (JVP). The statement announcing CUAD's formation listed six demands in addition to economic divestment and academic boycott: that Columbia call on government officials to demand an immediate ceasefire; divest from companies benefiting from Israeli apartheid; cancel the opening of the Tel Aviv Global Center; cease the dual-degree program with Tel Aviv University; protect academic freedom and stop vilifying pro-Palestinian activism; and reinstate SJP and JVP. Among the over 120 student groups that eventually joined CUAD were the Anthropology Graduate Student Association, Caribbean Students Association, and the campus chapters of Amnesty International, Jewish Voice for Peace, Students for Justice in Palestine, and Young Democratic Socialists of America.

CUAD demanded that Columbia stop investing its $14.8 billion endowment in companies supporting Israel's government, dismantle a university outpost in Tel Aviv, and end collaboration with Israeli universities. On October 9, 2024, Sharon Otterman of The New York Times reported that CUAD became more "hard-line in its rhetoric" over time, saying on October 8 that it supported "liberation by any means necessary, including armed resistance", that it would no longer "pander to liberal media to make the movement for liberation palatable", and that it withdrew an apology it had made for Khymani James, who said "Zionists don't deserve to live."

==== CU Jews for Ceasefire ====
In November 2023, after Jewish Voice for Peace was suspended, CU (Columbia University) Jews for Ceasefire, inspired by Jews for Ceasefire at Brown University, announced itself as an ad-hoc collective with a banner unveiled over Broadway.

==== Columbia Palestine Solidarity Coalition (CPSC) ====
On October 19, 2024, the Columbia Palestine Solidarity Coalition (CPSC) announced itself as a "collective of Palestinian student organizers who wish to reclaim the pro-Palestinian student movement and recenter Palestine at Columbia University" and as distinct from CUAD.

==== Dar-Jafra ====
Dar, or Dar-Jafra, is Columbia's undergraduate Palestinian student union or society. Mohsen Mahdawi, whom federal agents detained in April 2025 and attempted to deport, was a co-founder.

=== Pro-Israel protest groups ===
==== At Columbia ====
Students Supporting Israel, StandWithUs, Columbia Aryeh, and Columbia-Barnard Hillel were involved in pro-Israel activity at Columbia University during the Gaza war. Shai Davidai, a pro-Israel assistant professor at the Columbia Business School, was an outspoken figure.

==== Beyond Columbia ====
A WhatsApp group chat calling itself "Columbia Alumni for Israel" also worked to identify pro-Palestinian protesters and push for their punishment and deportation. Profiles of Columbia affiliates have also appeared on the anonymous doxing website Canary Mission, and Betar US, a militant Zionist group, compiled a list of students to be deported. The Anti-Defamation League has also pressured Columbia's administration to investigate and penalize SJP since October 2023, and Shipman announced a partnership with the organization in 2025.

=== Leadership of Columbia University ===
==== Trustees ====
There are 21 trustees of Columbia University in the City of New York, with David Greenwald and Claire Shipman serving as co-chairs. Jeh Johnson became co-chair after Shipman became acting president of Columbia on March 28, 2025. Chair emeritus Jonathan Lavine has also been involved.

==== University president(s) ====
Three presidents of Columbia University have presided over its Gaza war protests: Minouche Shafik (October 2023–August 14, 2024), interim president Katrina Armstrong (August 14, 2024 – March 28, 2025), and acting president Claire Shipman (since March 28, 2025). Laura Rosenbury, president of Banard College, has also been involved.

==== University Senate ====
The Columbia University Senate, a policy-making body composed of faculty and students, was established after the protests of 1968 and oversaw university discipline until 2025. Shipman announced a review of the Senate days after becoming acting president.

== Timeline ==
=== Fall 2023 ===
==== October 9, 2023: Statement of Solidarity ====
On October 9, 2023, the Columbia chapters of Students for Justice in Palestine (SJP) and Jewish Voice for Peace (JVP) published an open letter expressing "full solidarity with Palestinian resistance against over 75 years of Israeli settler-colonialism and apartheid" and calling for a protest at 4:30 p.m. on October 12.

The same day, in an official university-wide communication, Columbia University President Minouche Shafik wrote: "I was devastated by the horrific attack on Israel this weekend and the ensuing violence that is affecting so many people. Unfortunately, at this moment, little is certain except that the fighting and human suffering are not likely to end soon." As of September 2025, it was Columbia's last official statement using institutional voice about a global event.

In response to previous emails from General Studies Dean Lisa Rosen-Metsch and Barnard Dean Leslie Grinage, the first of the four demands of the protest planned by SJP and JVP for October 12 stated: "Address Palestinian humanity and Correct and apologize for the emails sent by Columbia administration that support Israel while ignoring—and neglecting to even name—Palestinians." The SJP-JVP Statement of Solidarity further demanded that Columbia "divest from companies profiting from Israeli apartheid", "cancel the opening of the Tel Aviv Global Center", and "cease the dual-degree partnership with Tel Aviv University".

==== October 10, 2023: Students Supporting Israel vigil ====
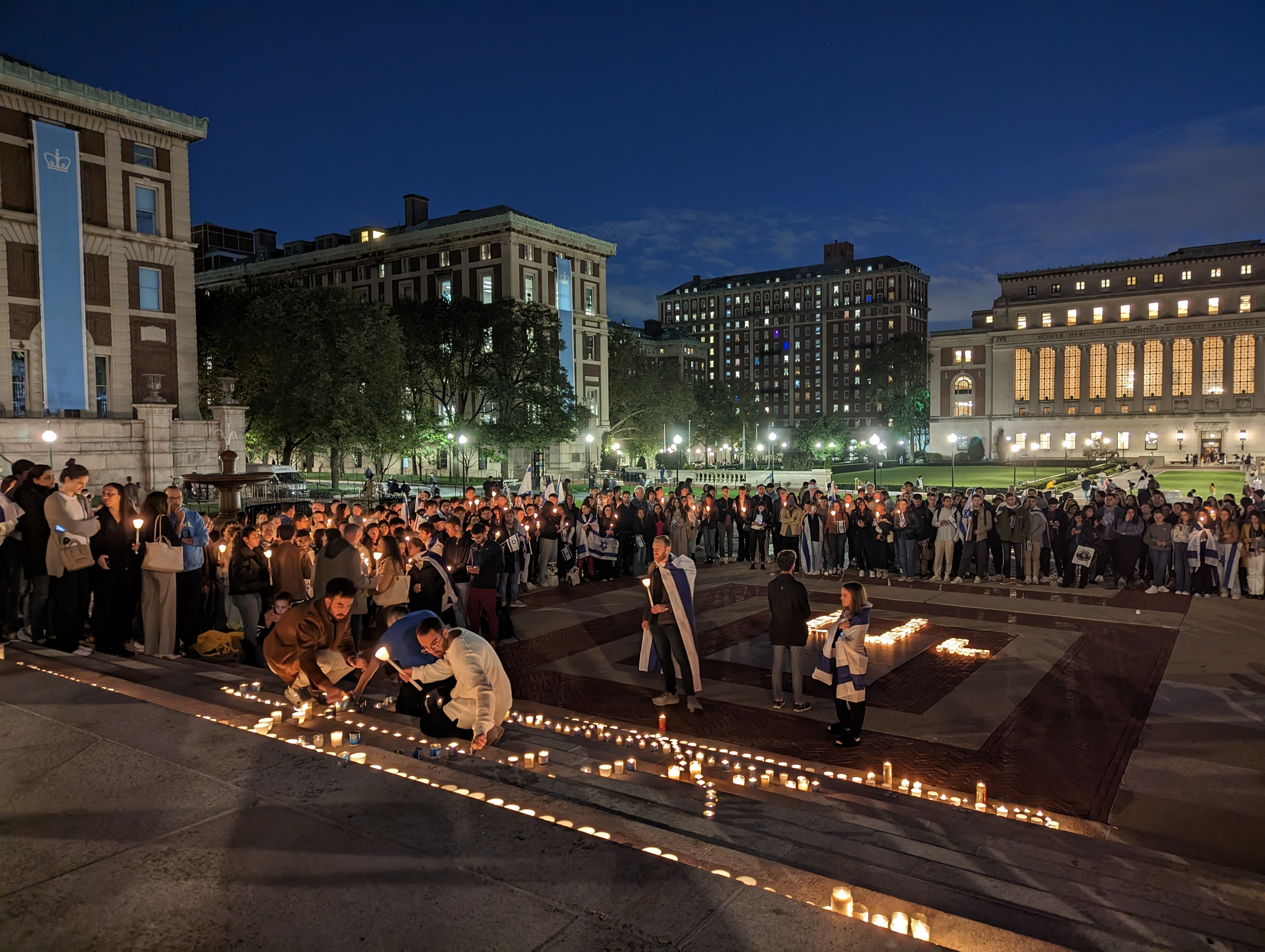
A vigil for Israel held by SSI at Columbia University October 10, 2023

Students Supporting Israel (SSI) held a rally and vigil on campus with around 100 people.

==== October 12, 2023: First protest ====
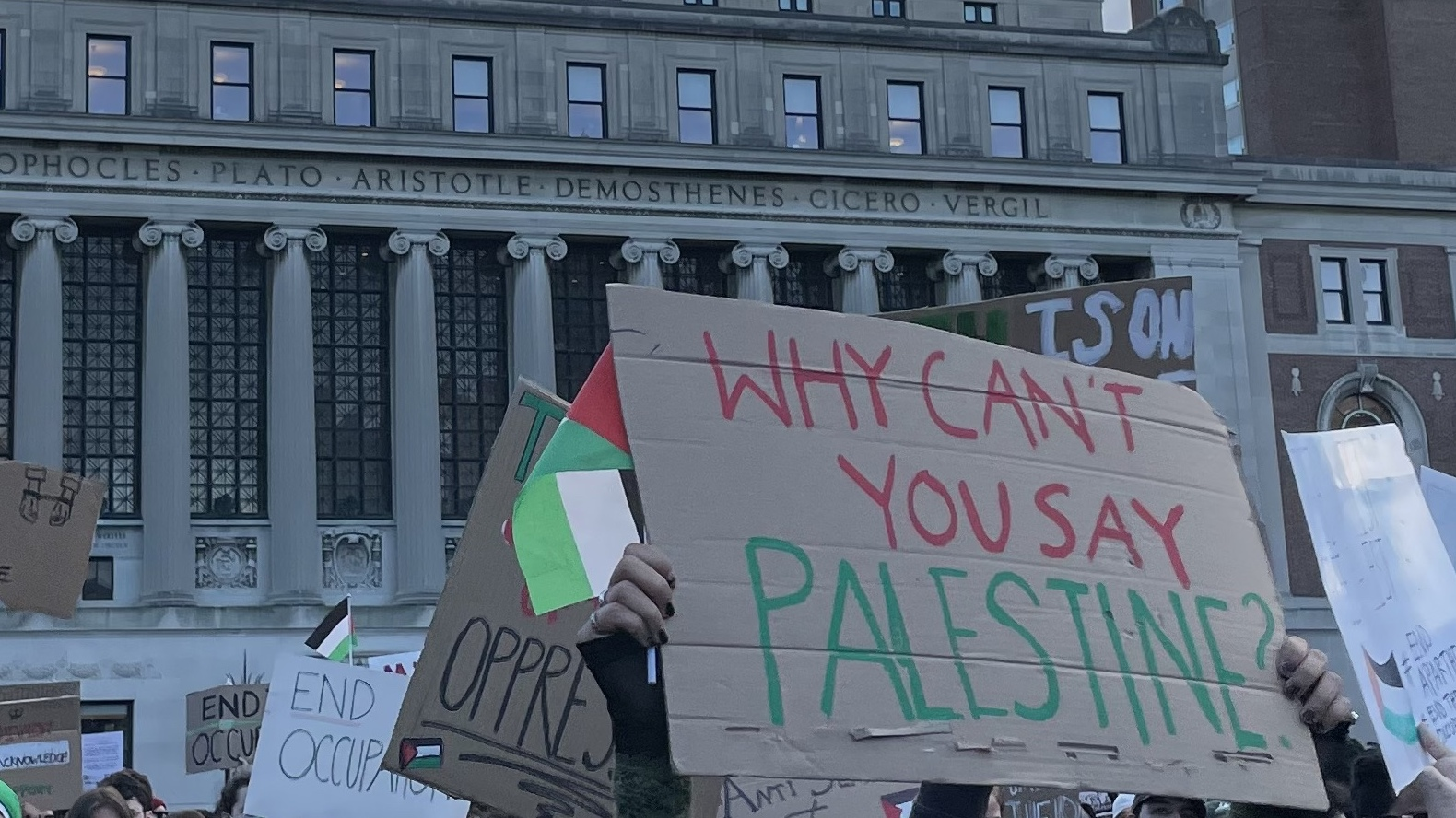
A sign that reads "Why can't you say Palestine?" at the first protest co-organized by the Columbia chapters of Students for Justice in Palestine and Jewish Voice for Peace, 12 October 2023.

In anticipation of the planned protest, Columbia University's administration announced late on October 11 that, starting the next day at 6 a.m., it would restrict access to its Morningside campus to Columbia University ID holders only. The afternoon of October 12, hundreds of Columbia affiliates gathered for the SJP-JVP protest; several supporters of Israel gathered to counter-protest.

In an interview with WKCR, a Columbia employee who identified himself as "an officer of administration" working "up in the bowels of Gotham up by the George Washington Bridge at the medical center" said: "I'm Jewish, okay? I'm a Zionist, okay? I hope every one of these people die", referring to the students protesting with SJP and JVP.

The next week, the State of Israel's Twitter/X account retweeted a video of Shai Davidai, then an assistant professor at the Columbia Business School, and called Columbia administrators "cowards". In the video, Davidai addressed President Minouche Shafik and said, "We are waiting for you to eradicate all pro-terror student organizations from campus." The video was also retweeted by Israeli ambassador to the United Nations Gilad Erdan, calling Columbia, Harvard, and New York University "terror supporting institutions".

==== October 24, 2023: University administration quietly changes University Event Policy ====
After the October 12 SJP-JVP protest, senior administrators quietly revised policies cited in the suspension on October 24, adding a new section to the University Event Policy webpage that declared the administration's right to "regulate the time, place and manner of certain forms of public expression" without input from the University Senate.

==== October 25, 2023: doxing trucks accusing students and affiliates of antisemitism drive around campus ====
The morning of October 25, billboard trucks sponsored by the conservative media group Accuracy in Media (AIM) began driving around Columbia's Morningside campus displaying the names and faces of Columbia students beneath the text "Columbia’s Leading Antisemites". The media group also created a website called "Columbia Hates Jews", listing the names of 29 Columbia affiliates it claimed were antisemites. Adam Guillette, the president of the media group, announced that it had purchased domain names matching students' names. According to the University Senate's March 2025 Sundial Report, AIM took students' information from CampusGroups, an online database used by SIPA.

==== November 1, 2023: Walkout of class taught by Hillary Clinton; Task Force on Antisemitism announced ====
There was a student walkout of a class taught by SIPA Dean Keren Yarhi-Milo and Hillary Clinton on November 1 after Clinton made remarks opposing a ceasefire. The protesters also demanded an investigation into CampusGroups, the SIPA online platform from which AIM took students' information for use on its doxing trucks and websites.

Also on November 1, Columbia President Minouche Shafik, Barnard President Laura Rosenbury, and Teacher's College President Thomas Bailey announced the establishment of a Task Force on Antisemitism with Esther Fuchs, Nicholas Lemann, and David Schizer as its co-chairs. The establishment of the task force was criticized by some, such as James Schamus, who said it did not define antisemitism. No similar task force was established to address anti-Palestinian racism, Islamophobia, or other forms of discrimination.

The administration also announced a Doxxing Resource Group in response to students' AIM doxing truck complaints.

==== November 9, 2023: Walkout and art installation at Low Plaza ====
On November 9, SJP and JVP hosted a walkout, protest, art installation, and die-in at the steps of Low Memorial Library. At the protest, student organizer Mohsen Mahdawi told his story of growing up in a refugee camp in the occupied West Bank, of witnessing his 12-year-old best friend killed in front of him by an Israeli soldier and of being shot in the leg himself at 15 years old, also by an Israeli soldier.

There were pro-Israel counter-protesters, whom Mahdawi addressed: "Even though you're on the other side, we beg you, we cry, we ask you to see the humanity in us, to join us in our fight for freedom, for justice, for humanity."

An unidentified outside agitator interrupted the protest, approaching it from the outside screaming anti-Jewish and anti-Black slurs and profanities. According to The New York Times, a "student on the outskirts of a Nov. 9 protest had shouted antisemitic curses", but "he was not affiliated with any of the student groups, and was shouted down by the pro-Palestinian protesters", including Mahdawi.

==== November 10, 2023: Students for Justice in Palestine and Jewish Voice for Peace irregularly suspended ====
On November 10, Columbia senior administrator Gerald Rosberg announced the suspension of SJP and JVP, citing a violation of university rules after the November 9 protest, which he described as an "unauthorized event" that included "threatening rhetoric and intimidation". The suspension came after senior administrators quietly revised policies cited in the suspension on October 24, adding a new section to the University Event Policy webpage that declared the administration's right to "regulate the time, place and manner of certain forms of public expression" without input from the University Senate. Hundreds of students and faculty members protested the suspension and signed open letters in condemnation.

On October 25, Jonathan Greenblatt of the Anti-Defamation League (ADL) and Alyza D. Lewin and Kenneth L. Marcus of the Brandeis Center had written university presidents a letter calling on them to investigate SJP for "potential violations of the prohibition against materially supporting a foreign terrorist organization", adding that "universities must also update their code of conduct to ensure that harassment and support for terrorism have no place on campus."

The claim that SJP and JVP used "threatening rhetoric and intimidation" was debunked by journalists and retracted by Rosberg privately in a University Senate Plenary on November 17, 2023, but Columbia did not reverse the suspension of SJP and JVP and never issued a public statement to correct and clarify the matter. The suspension heightened conflicts between faculty and administration.

In April 2025, US Secretary of State Marco Rubio cited the phrase "threatening rhetoric and intimidation" verbatim, apparently drawing from the statement Columbia did not retract, in a memo delivered in support of his case against Mohsen Mahdawi.

==== November 14, 2023: Establishment of Columbia University Apartheid Divest ====
At a protest in response to the suspension of SJP and JVP, Columbia University Apartheid Divest (CUAD) (Note: An unrelated group with the name Columbia University Apartheid Divest first formed in 2016.) was announced as a coalition of over 80 student groups (later, over 120 student groups). The statement announcing CUAD's formation listed six demands in addition to economic divestment and academic boycott: (1) call on government officials to call for an immediate ceasefire; (2) divest from companies benefiting from Israeli apartheid; (3) cancel the opening of the Tel Aviv Global Center; (4) cease the dual-degree program with Tel Aviv University; (5) protect academic freedom and stop vilifying pro-Palestinian activism; and (6) reinstate SJP and JVP.

==== November 16, 2023: House Committee opens Title VI investigation ====
The US House Committee on Education and Workforce opened an investigation into Columbia and six other schools, including Cornell University, the University of Pennsylvania, and Cooper Union, for alleged violations of Title VI of the Civil Rights Act of 1964. The committee was responding to five complaints of antisemitic harassment and two of anti-Muslim harassment, though it was not initially clear which applied to Columbia.

==== November 30, 2023: "Joy is canceled" protest during the Tree Lighting ceremony ====
The recently formed CUAD held a protest during the annual Tree Lighting ceremony on College Walk. The protesters chanted phrases such as "There’s no room for celebration, end Israeli occupation" between songs, but—at the request of the Columbia College Student Council (CCSC), which had been in communication with CUAD—it did not otherwise interrupt the various student performances. A CCSC representative said: "we expressed that we completely understood and supported their right to protest, but wanted to respect the work and time our student performers put into their set."

The "Joy is canceled" protest followed a CUAD protest earlier in the day outside a SIPA event at Low Memorial Library called "The War in Gaza: Constructive Campus Conversations" with Keren Yarhi-Milo and Amaney Jamal.

==== December 11, 2023: First protest at Barnard demands that Rosenbury call for ceasefire ====
After the US vetoed a UN resolution demanding immediate entry of humanitarian aid and an unconditional ceasefire (the US vetoed the fourth ceasefire resolution during the Gaza War), students protested at Barnard College's Futter Field, demanding that the college's president, Laura Rosenbury, publicly call for a lasting ceasefire in Gaza. By the end of January, Barnard administration had started disciplinary processes for at least 19 students involved in the protest.

=== Spring 2024 ===
==== January 19, 2024: Former Israeli soldiers attack demonstrators ====
On January 19, 2024, students at a pro-Palestinian demonstration on campus were sprayed with a chemical that they alleged to be Skunk, a foul-smelling spray usually used as crowd control by the Israel Defense Forces, causing various injuries. At least eight students sought medical attention. In response, demonstrators organized a protest outside the university on February 2 and SJP and JVP published a report stating that the perpetrators were former IDF soldiers and current Columbia students. Two former Israeli soldiers were accused of attacking the pro-Palestinian demonstrators with noxious chemicals in what the interim provost Dennis Mitchell said appeared to be "serious crimes, possibly hate crimes". The New York City Police Department announced that it would investigate the event as a potential hate crime.

The attack's perpetrators were initially placed on interim suspension before later being suspended through May 2025. In April, one of the perpetrators, who had been suspended the previous month, sued the university under the pseudonym John Doe, claiming that he had actually sprayed non-toxic "gag gift" fart sprays he had purchased from Amazon, adding that pro-Palestine students doxxed him in retaliation. The suspended student alleged that Columbia subjected him to "biased misconduct proceedings" and that he had used fart sprays such as "Liquid Ass", not harmful chemicals. After a joint investigation by the NYPD and Columbia, the school concluded that the chemical substance was a "non-toxic, legal, novelty item".

==== February 2, 2024: Rosenbury's inauguration interrupted by protesters ====
Ten student protesters were removed from Laura Rosenbury's inauguration as the ninth president of Barnard College, as, one by one, they interrupted her speech and were removed. Rosenbury told the protesters they were free to speak as they were each escorted out. The event was attended by a dozen protesters and a slim crowd after pro-Palestinian student groups called for a boycott of what CUAD called "the inauguration of new Barnard president, defender of Zionism and enemy of academic freedom". As the protesters spoke, audio was cut from the live stream, and later video too.

==== February 5, 2024: screening of Israelism after initial ban ====
Jewish students and faculty at Columbia and Barnard hosted a screening at Lehman Auditorium of the 2023 documentary film Israelism attended by approximately 200 students. It was followed by an hour-long question-and-answer session with panelists Simone Zimmerman, Helga Tawil-Souri, and Rabbi Rachel Kahn-Troster. Barnard President Laura Rosenbury had attempted to cancel the screening for weeks. On January 17, she called the event's faculty organizer into her office and told her to pause the screening due to concerns that it might be cited in a Title VI lawsuit, as it had been at other schools. On January 31, Rosenbury allowed the screening, and event organizers made the event happen in person instead of by alternative methods being considered.

==== February 19, 2024: “Interim Policy on Safe Demonstrations” ====
On February 19, 2024, the Columbia administration revised the policy it had unilaterally implemented in October 2023 before suspending SJP and JVP in November 2023. The revised "Interim Policy on Safe Demonstrations" considered consultation with the University Senate's executive committee. The policy limited the time and place of protest activity to a protest zone including the South Lawn or the Sundial from midday to 6 pm on weekdays, and would expire at the end of the spring 2024 semester.

==== March 4, 2024: Columbia's Task Force on Antisemitism's first report calls for increased restrictions on protests ====
Columbia's Task Force on Antisemitism—co-chaired by Esther Fuchs, Nicholas Lemann, and David Schizer—released its first report, in which it did not define antisemitism but called for more restrictions on protests.

==== March 24, 2024: Resistance 101 panel ====
On March 24, 2024, students held a "Resistance 101" panel featuring speakers from Within Our Lifetime, Masar Badil, and Samidoun Palestinian Prisoners Network, as well as Khaled Barakat, allegedly a member of the Popular Front for the Liberation of Palestine, though Barakat denied that. Columbia's newly hired Chief Operating Officer Cas Holloway released a statement declaring that Columbia "immediately notified law enforcement and engaged an outside firm led by experienced former law enforcement investigators to conduct an investigation". For their alleged involvement in the panel, six students were suspended and given notice that they would be evicted from Columbia housing in 24 hours. The law firm Debevoise & Plimpton investigated the event.

Columbia also hired a private investigation firm to surveil students in relation to the event. The Columbia Spectator reported that two men in suits appeared at the residence of an undergraduate student on the morning of April 1, and that a man called the student's personal phone and identified himself as a private investigator. According to the Spectator, his LinkedIn profile showed that he had worked at the investigation firm Renaissance Associates since February 2023. In a meeting with the private investigators, the student was shown photos of himself standing outside of Q House, the LGBTQ Columbia residence hall where the Resistance 101 event took place. Another student received a morning email from Holloway threatening disciplinary action if they did not meet with the investigators by 5 p.m., and was placed on interim suspension and forced out their residence for refusing to do so.

==== April 4, 2024: All out for al-Shifa ====
On April 4, CUAD and SWC-UAW organized a protest after Israeli military's second siege of Al-Shifa Hospital in the Gaza Strip. In anticipation of the demonstration, Holloway emailed dozens of student leaders of groups signed onto the CUAD coalition to say that the planned protest would violate the "Interim Policy on Safe Demonstrations" as it had not been registered in compliance with the policy.

=== Gaza Solidarity Encampment ===
==== April 17–21, 2024: first encampment ("Gaza Solidarity Encampment"), eviction, and second encampment ====
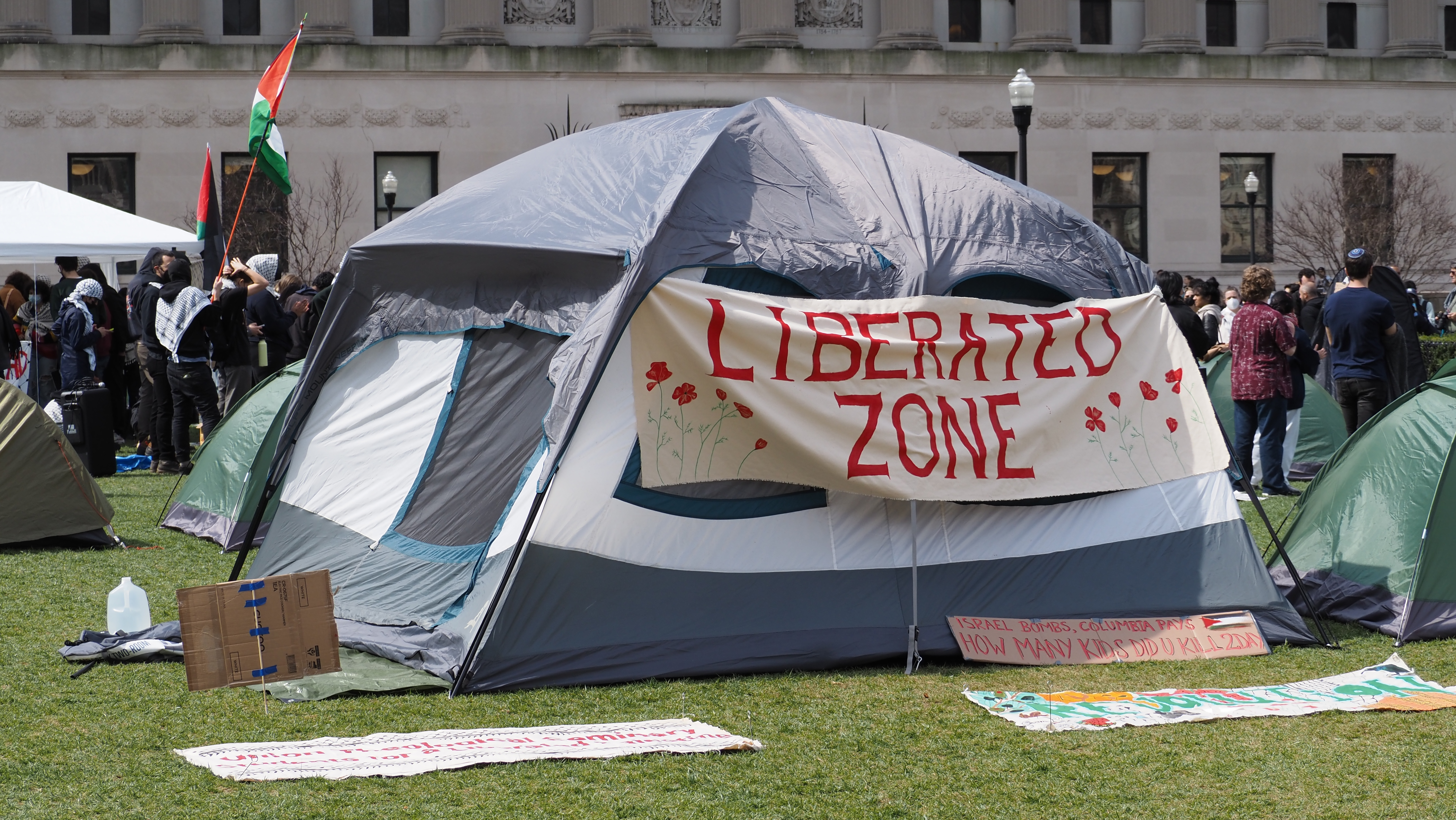
A tent displays a banner saying "Liberated Zone" as protesters occupy Columbia's east lawn, April 17.

The Gaza Solidarity Encampment was established with approximately 50 tents on the East Butler Lawn in the early morning of 17 April, the day university president Minouche Shafik and co-chairs of the university's board of trustees David Greenwald and Claire Shipman were due to testify before the US House Committee on Education and Workforce. Beginning around 4 am, about 70 protesters sat in tents bearing the Palestinian flag on the East Butler Lawn. When Shafik summoned the New York Police Department's Strategic Response Group to mass arrest the student protesters and dismantle the encampment on April 18, students from the large crowd that had gathered around the lawn immediately occupied the adjacent West Butler Lawn and established another encampment there the next day.

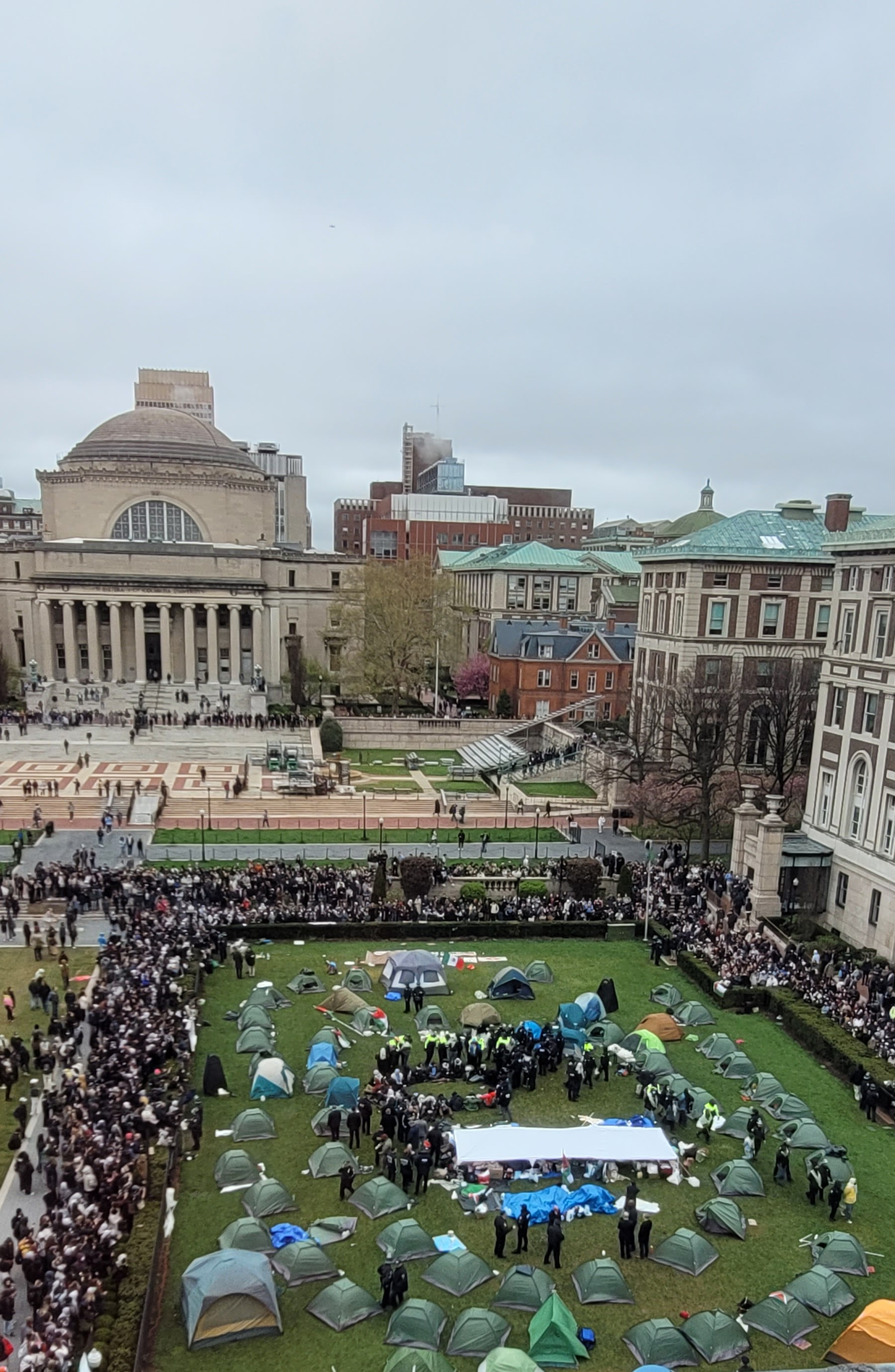
NYPD pictured during their arrest of approximately 100 students who remained inside the original East Lawn encampment. A crowd of protesters and student bystanders surround the lawn.

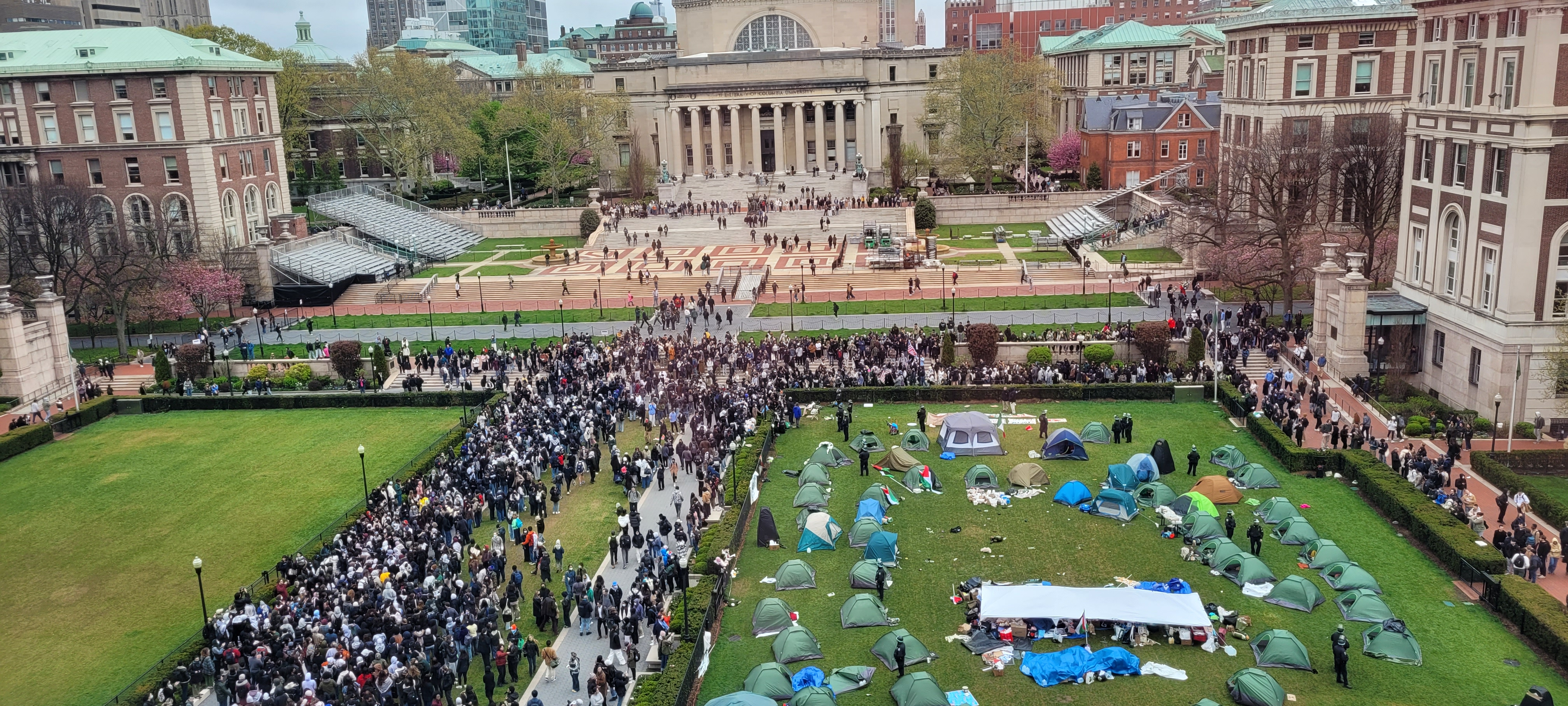
NYPD cleaning the original encampment on the East Lawn, shortly after the arrests

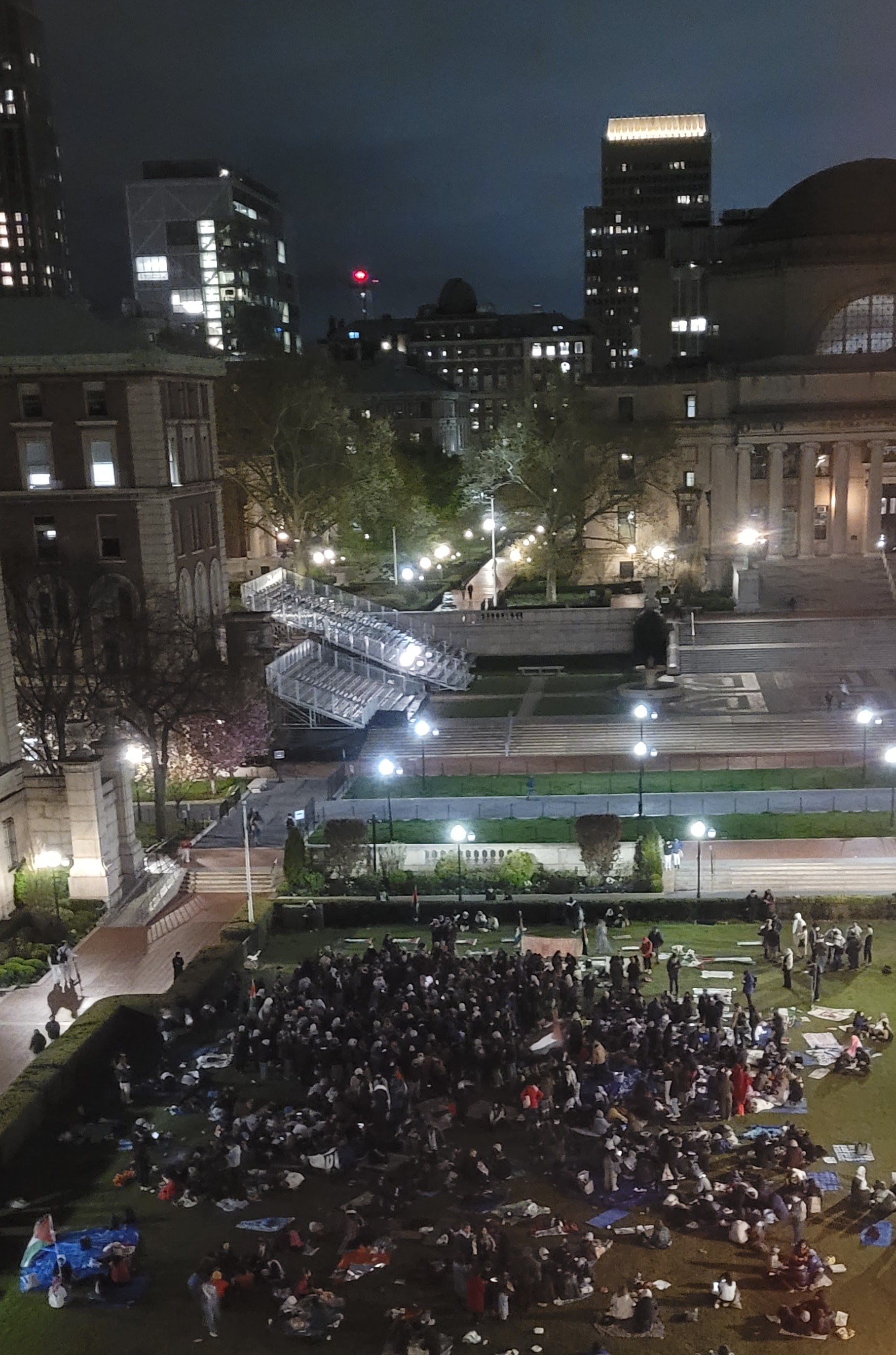
Pro-Palestinian student protesters gathered on the opposite West lawn, the evening after the arrests.

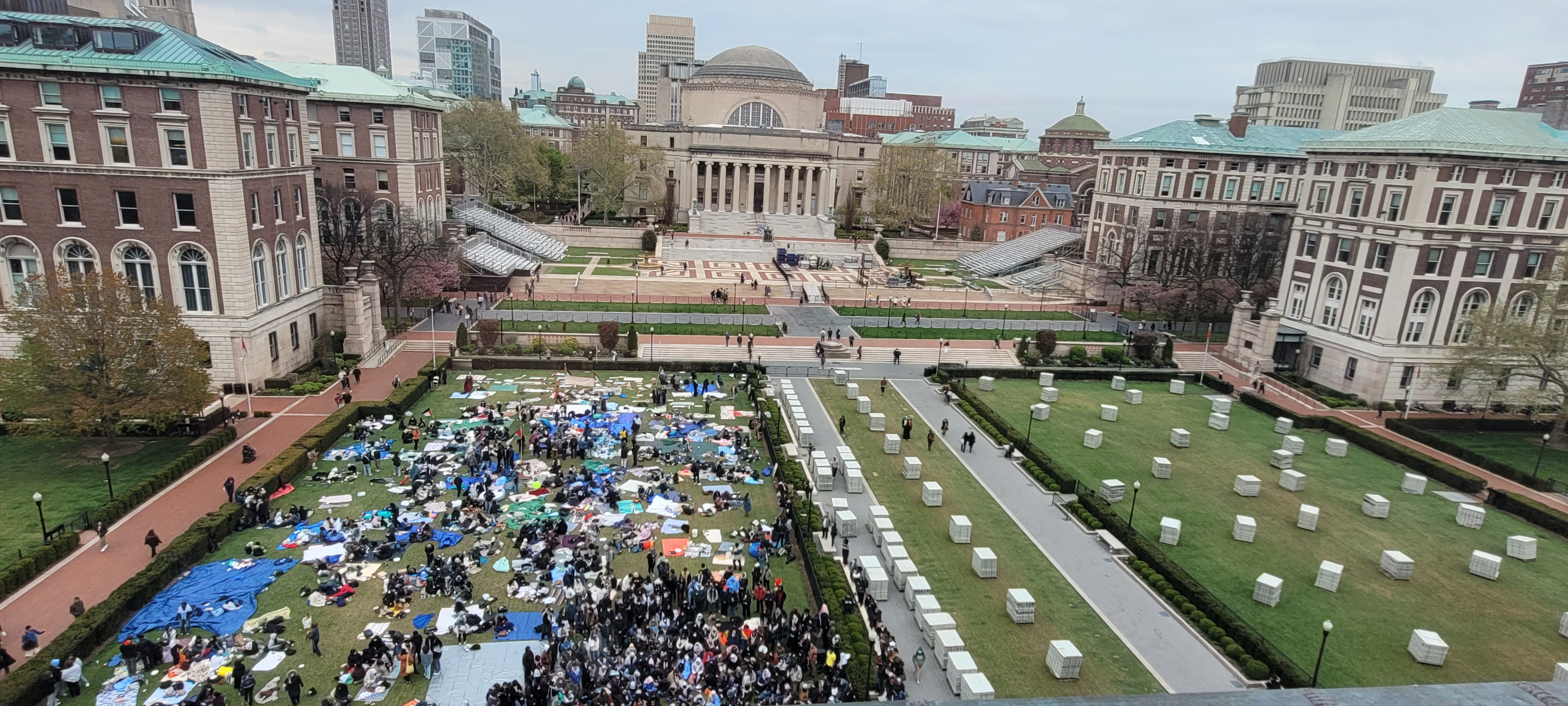
Sit-in through the second day after arrests, with the East side of the lawn getting barricaded, to prevent reestablishment of the original encampment

==== April 20, 2024: students in keffiyehs harassed at General Studies Gala ====
Six students who were wearing keffiyehs to the School of General Studies Gala in support of the 108 students arrested in connection with the "Gaza Solidarity Encampment" said they were harassed and physically assaulted at the event.

During the weekend of April 20–21, public safety officers from the administration told WKCR-FM, which had been broadcasting information about the protest, to vacate its office due to an unspecified danger. Staff refused, saying they had a responsibility to broadcast information 24/7. WKCR later said it was a misunderstanding. According to The New York Times, protesters also targeted some Jewish students with "antisemitic vitriol", leaving some Jewish students "fearful for their safety on the campus and its vicinity".

==== April 21, 2024: Rabbi Elie Buechler advises Jewish students to stay at home ====
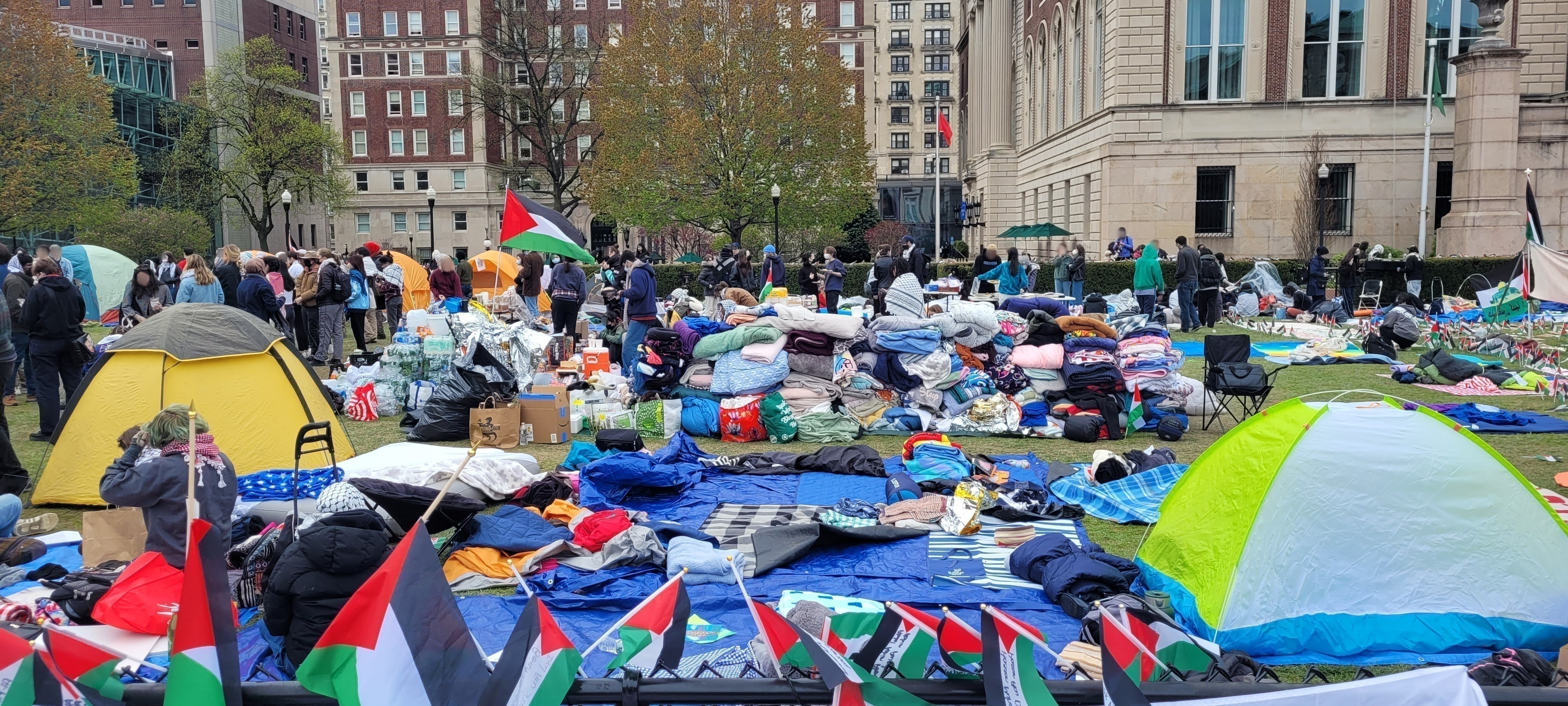
New tents added after the reinstatement of the encampment

On April 21, Elie Buechler, a rabbi associated with Columbia University's Orthodox Union Jewish Learning Initiative on Campus, recommended that Jewish students "return home as soon as possible and remain home", arguing that the ongoing campus occupation had "made it clear that Columbia University’s Public Safety and the NYPD cannot guarantee Jewish students’ safety". Footage of protests over the weekend showed some protesters using antisemitic language against Jewish students, and many Jewish students said they felt unsafe.

==== April 22, 2024: overwhelming majority of Columbia College votes in favor of divestment ====
A majority of Columbia College students voted in favor of divestment in a referendum sent by the Columbia College Student Council. 76.55% voted in favor of financially divesting from Israel, 68.36% voted to cancel the opening of the Tel Aviv Global Center, and 65.62% voted to end the dual degree program with Tel Aviv University.

==== April 22–28, 2024: Walkout, negotiations suspended, and counter-protests ====
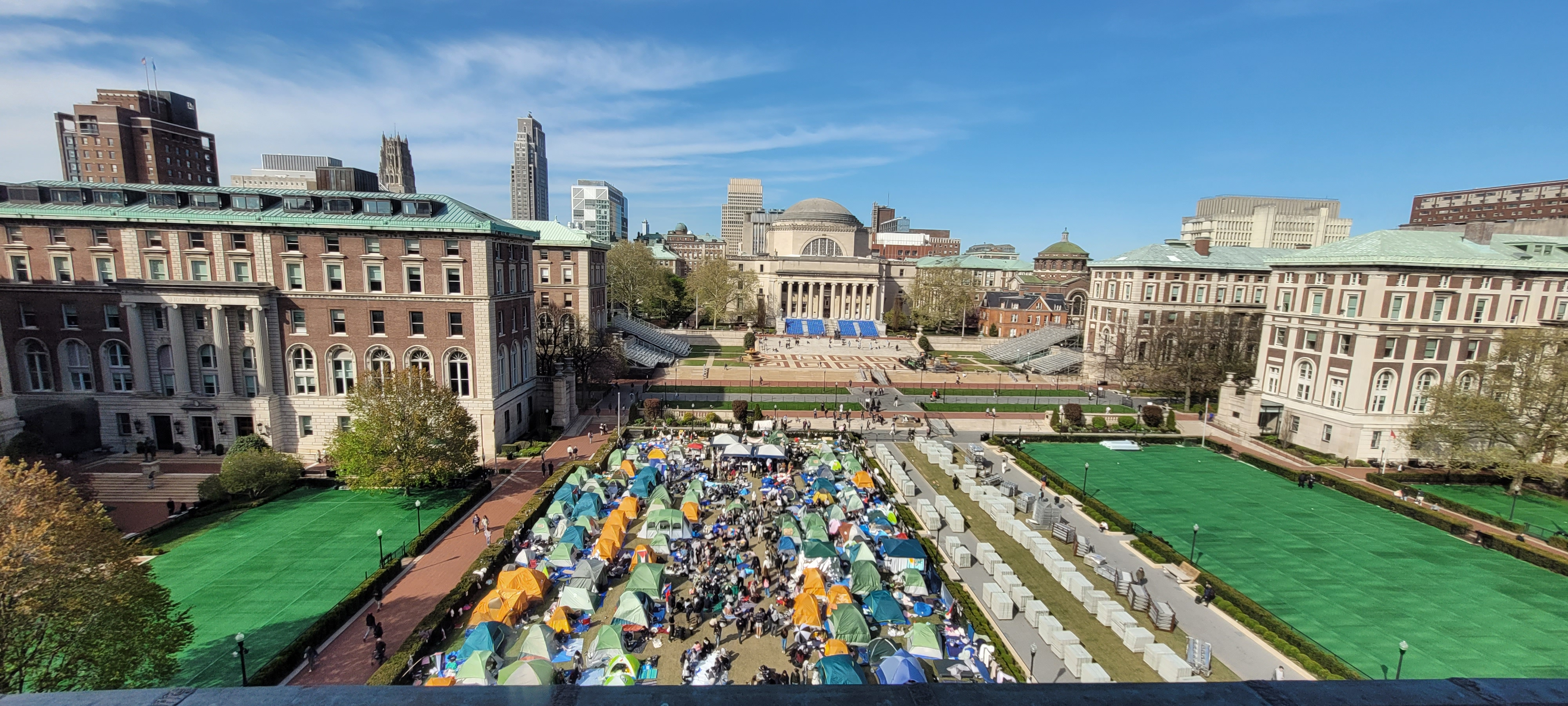
The second encampment, which was larger than the initial one, held over 60 tents, with barricades isolating the encampment from pedestrians walking through the university's lawn.

Hundreds of Columbia faculty members walked out of classes to protest the university's response to the protest. Because of the protest, the university canceled classes on April 22, and then said it would switch to blended learning for the remainder of the semester. The Columbia Elections Board announced that a referendum on divestment from Israel, originally proposed by CUAD on March 3, 2024, had passed by a large margin, showing that Columbia's student body mostly supported the initiative. In the evening, the students celebrated a Seder on the first evening of Passover.

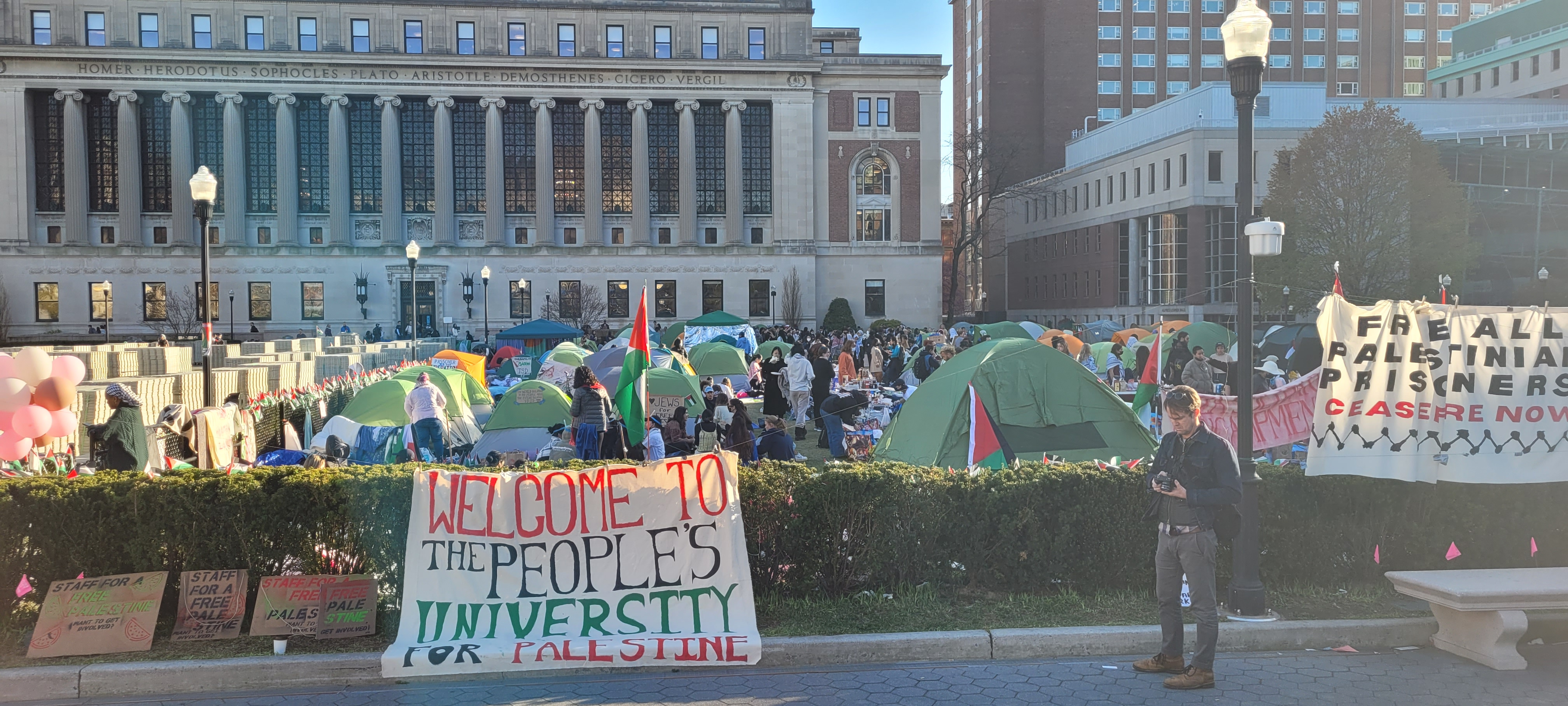
Signs at the second encampment, including one stating: "Welcome to the People's University for Palestine"

On April 23, A student organizer said that protesters were in negotiations with the university through a legal negotiator but declined to share details. Ben Chang, Columbia's spokesperson, said that organizers had met with university officials in the early morning to discuss the situation. Shafik issued a midnight deadline for protesters to either agree to vacate campus or face the university's consideration of "alternative options for clearing the West Lawn and restoring calm to campus". Jewish pro-Palestinian students held Passover Seder within the encampment.

Shortly after midnight on April 24, SJP reported that protesters had suspended negotiations because the university had threatened to call in the New York Army National Guard to clear them out, saying they would not return to the negotiating table until Columbia rescinded its threat. But the university said that "important progress" had been made in negotiations and that Shafik's original deadline would be extended by 48 hours, that the students had agreed to reduce the number of tents, and that they would ensure that protesters not affiliated with Columbia would leave campus. Protesters were seen taking down and moving some tents. Meanwhile, the NYPD dispersed about 100 protesters outside campus.

In the afternoon of April 24, Speaker of the United States House of Representatives Mike Johnson gave a speech in front of Low Library condemning the protesters and calling for Shafik to resign. Some in attendance loudly booed him. During his speech, Johnson said that during the October 7 attack, "infants were cooked in ovens", an unsubstantiated claim. Later, he called on President Joe Biden to deploy the National Guard to quell the protests; White House Press Secretary Karine Jean-Pierre replied that such deployment is up to the governor of New York, not the president. The next day, Palestine Legal filed a Title VI suit with regard to suspended students. The Columbia Board of Trustees issued statements in affirmation of Shafik. The University Senate held an emergency meeting with Shafik to consider censuring her.

==== April 25, 2024: United for Israel rally outside Amsterdam gates ====
On the evening of April 25, at Columbia's Amsterdam Avenue gates, a United for Israel rally held by StandWithUs along with right-wing figures including Sean Feucht, Eric Metaxas, and Russell B. Johnson, attracted hundreds of pro-Israel demonstrators, and multiple incidents of harassment were reported. The rally was promoted as a "unity march of Christians and Jews" and some demonstrators harassed pro-Palestinian counter-protesters and targeted some counter-protesters inside the gates. Around 3 pm the day before, Gavin McInnes, founder of the far-right militant group the Proud Boys, had gained access to campus and was seen approaching students at the encampment with a recording device and unsuccessfully attempting to gain access to the encampment, being turned away by students.

U.S. Representatives Alexandria Ocasio-Cortez and Jamaal Bowman visited the encampment. Columbia library workers issued a statement condemning Shafik for deploying police and private security against the protesters. More than 1,000 pro-Israel protesters organized by the "New York Hostage and Missing Families Forum" rallied at 116th and Broadway. The University Senate announced plans to call for a censure vote against Shafik but decided instead to vote on a resolution expressing displeasure with her out of reluctance to oust the president in a time of crisis.

Khymani James, a Columbia student who participated in the protest movement, was barred from campus after a video from January surfaced in which they said, "Zionists don’t deserve to live". Some protest groups condemned the comment, although one group, Columbia University Apartheid Divest, retracted its condemnation in October 2024 and apologized to James, calling for violence against supporters of Israeli policy. The New York Times said James's comments raised the question, "How much of the movement in support of the Palestinian people in Gaza is tainted by antisemitism?" On April 27, James apologized. The NYPD said that outside agitators were trying to hijack the protests, and that they were ready to raid the campus if needed. The next day, the administration called for the protesters to leave, and said that bringing back the NYPD would be counterproductive.

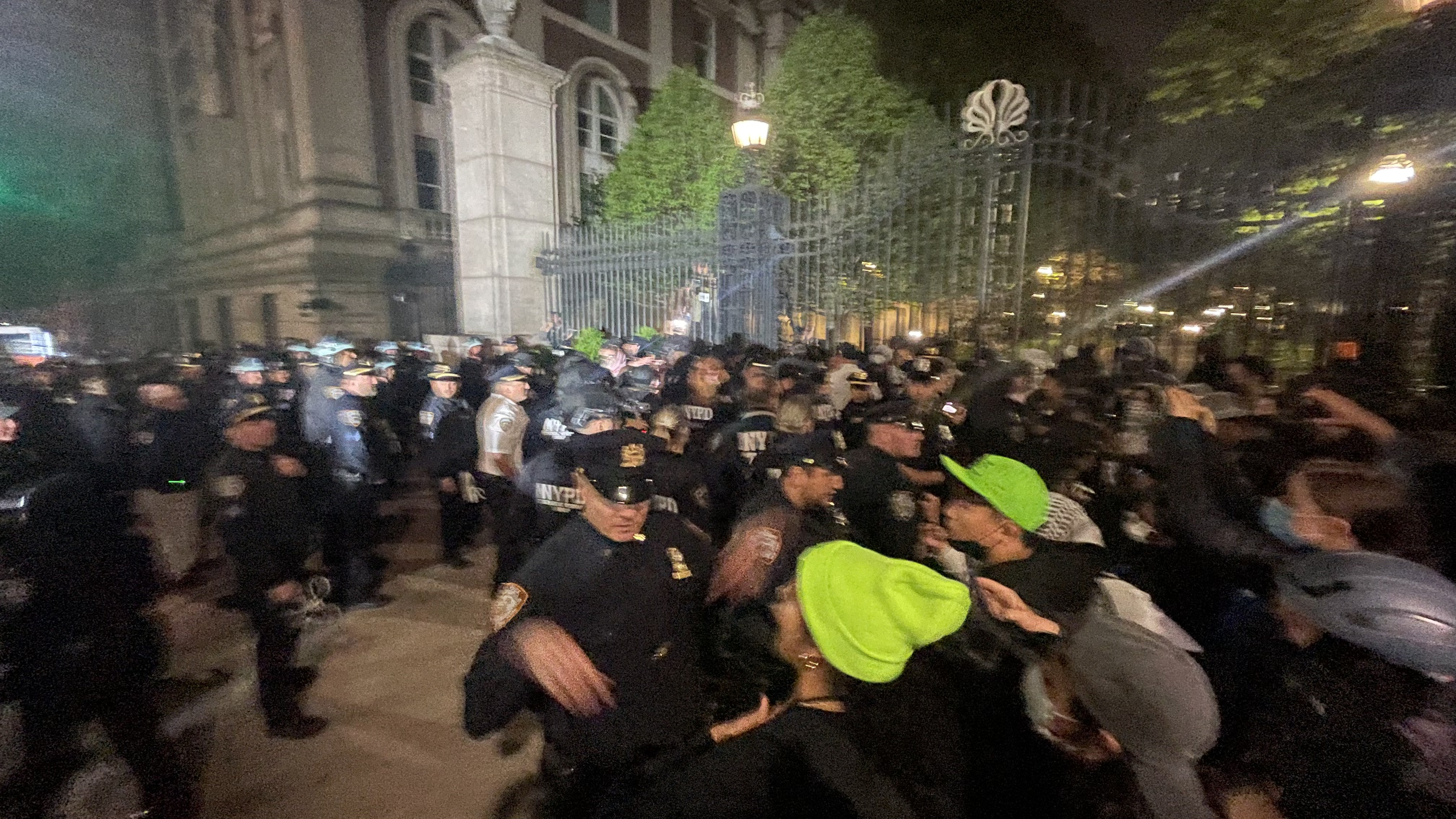
NYPD officers clear a crowd by force from Columbia's gates on Amsterdam Avenue.

==== April 29 – May 2, 2024: "Hind's Hall" occupation of Hamilton Hall, subsequent raid, and arrests ====
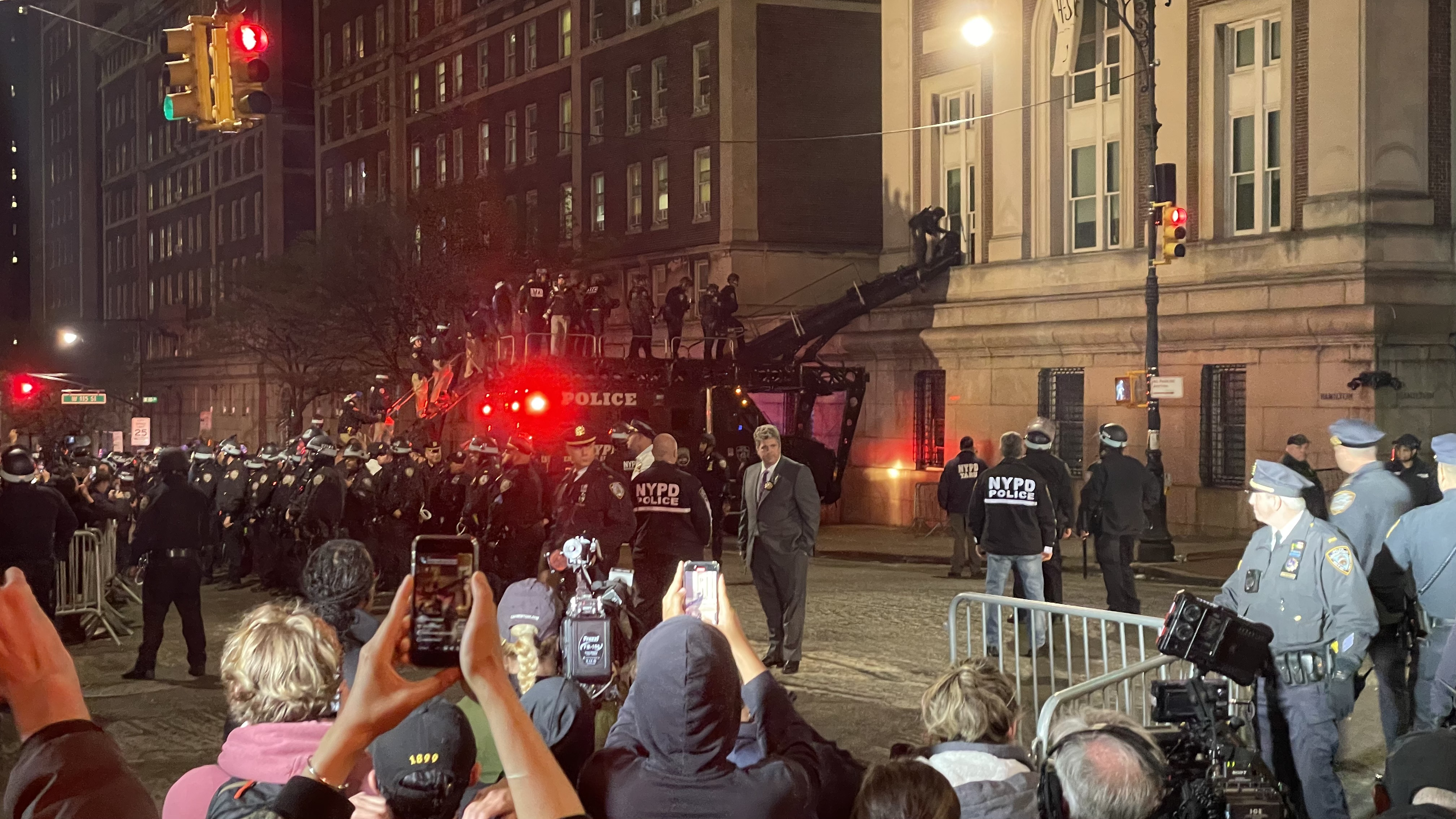
NYPD officers preparing to raid Hamilton Hall line up aboard a Lenco BearCat, evening of April 30.

Negotiations between protesters and the university came to a "dead end" on April 29. The administration threatened to suspend students still in the encampment by 2 pm. It also offered a partial amnesty deal. CUAD voted to stay in the encampment after the deadline, and SJP told members not to sign any administration deals. Faculty linked arms around the encampment before the deadline. Despite the threats, students stayed in the encampment and surrounding areas. Suspensions began later that day. Meanwhile, a Jewish student sued the university for failing to provide a safe environment, police set up barricades outside the university, and alumni wrote Shafik a letter asking her to clear the encampment.

In the early morning of April 30, protesters occupied Hamilton Hall, breaking windows, and barricaded themselves inside. Protesters unfurled a banner purporting to rename the building "Hind's Hall" in honor of Hind Rajab, a young Palestinian girl killed by Israeli forces. A campus police officer in the lobby left the building when confronted by the occupiers, while three Columbia janitors, among them Mario Torres, who tried to block the protesters, were briefly stuck inside and left the building after approximately 30 minutes. The campus was locked down and higher police presence was noted near campus; the NYPD and the university said they would not send police in. The administration threatened to expel students who participated in the hall takeover. Activist Lisa Fithian was spotted aiding protesters breaking into Hamilton Hall.

Late in the evening, a heavy riot police presence was seen outside the campus. The administration told students to shelter in place due to "heightened activity". The NYPD prepared to raid the campus after a letter from Shafik gave it permission. Protesters appeared undeterred, continuing chants. At around 9 pm, the NYPD entered campus with administration approval. The administration blamed protesters for escalating by taking Hamilton Hall. According to Shafik's letter to the NYPD Deputy Commissioner of Legal Matters requesting police intervention, someone hid in the building until it closed, then let others in. Columbia believed that while students were among those who entered, their leaders were unaffiliated with the university. Police used flash-bang grenades to breach the building and arrested more than 100 protesters. Officers were seen entering the building with weapons drawn, and a shot was fired inside the building. The district attorney's office said no one was injured and their Police Accountability Unit was reviewing the incident. By the end of the night, Hamilton Hall and the entire campus were cleared, including the encampment.

The Washington Post reported that billionaires and titans of business in a WhatsApp group with Mayor Eric Adams encouraged him to send police to sweep the Columbia protests. The Post reported that a group including Daniel Lubetzky, Daniel S. Loeb, Len Blavatnik, and Joseph Sitt joined a Zoom call with Adams on April 26, a week after he first sent the NYPD onto Columbia's campus to arrest students, and some spoke of making political donations to Adams. Ways members of the WhatsApp group could pressure Columbia's trustees and administration to summon the police on the protesters were also discussed.

According to Manhattan District Attorney Alvin Bragg, 109 people were arrested at Columbia. In the letter to the deputy commissioner, Shafik requested an NYPD presence through at least May 17, two days after the scheduled commencement. On May 2, the NYPD announced that during arrests at Columbia, out of 112 people arrested, 32 were not affiliated with the school. Mayor Eric Adams emphasized the role of "outside agitators" and said there was evidence that "professional" Nahla al-Arian, the wife of Sami Al-Arian, had attended the protests.

The actions taken against the demonstrators by the NYPD in riot armor while clearing Hamilton Hall inspired Macklemore's song "Hinds Hall", whose lyrics call the police "actors in badges". In June, the charges against most of the participants in the occupation of Hamilton Hall were dropped. Before and after the encampment, Jewish students sued the university, alleging civil rights and university policy violations due to harassment and abuse of Jewish students. One lawsuit was settled. Pro-Palestinian students also sued the university, claiming civil rights and university policy violations in connection with the university's actions against the protesters.

=== Summer 2024 ===
==== May 6–16, 2024: Graduation ceremony canceled and continued protests ====
Despite claims that the police sweep was done to ensure a main graduation commencement, especially as the class of 2024 had its high school commencement canceled due to COVID, the university decided on May 6 to cancel the main commencement, though the various colleges and schools of the university planned to hold separate commencements.

Small pro-Palestinian protests were held outside the homes of some Columbia University trustees on May 7. During one such protest, a pro-Israel man argued with some of the protesters before driving into the protest. The driver and a struck protester were both arrested and treated at the hospital for minor injuries.

On May 16, faculty, students and religious leaders held a "People's Graduation" ceremony at the Cathedral of St. John the Divine for students who were punished for participating in the encampment. Palestinian-American poet Fady Joudah and Palestinian journalist Hind Khoudary spoke at the event.

==== May 31 – June 2, 2024: "Revolt for Rafah" alumni weekend encampment ====
On May 31, students regrouped and launched a third encampment. About 100 students participated in the protest, which was said to be a response to the Rafah offensive and a Washington Post article revealing that elites pressured Adams into sending the NYPD in during the second raid. Students said the encampment was only the first of a continued protest presence on the campus, remaining for alumni reunion weekend. By 7 pm, about two dozen students with ten tents had occupied part of the South Lawn during the university's alumni reunion. According to Columbia SJP, the protesters identify as "an autonomous group of Palestinian students". The encampment was dismantled on June 2, once the alumni weekend ended. The NYPD briefly entered the campus to document vandalism that took place.

==== June 3–6, 2024: Columbia Law Review publishes Eghbariah article; board of directors shuts down website ====
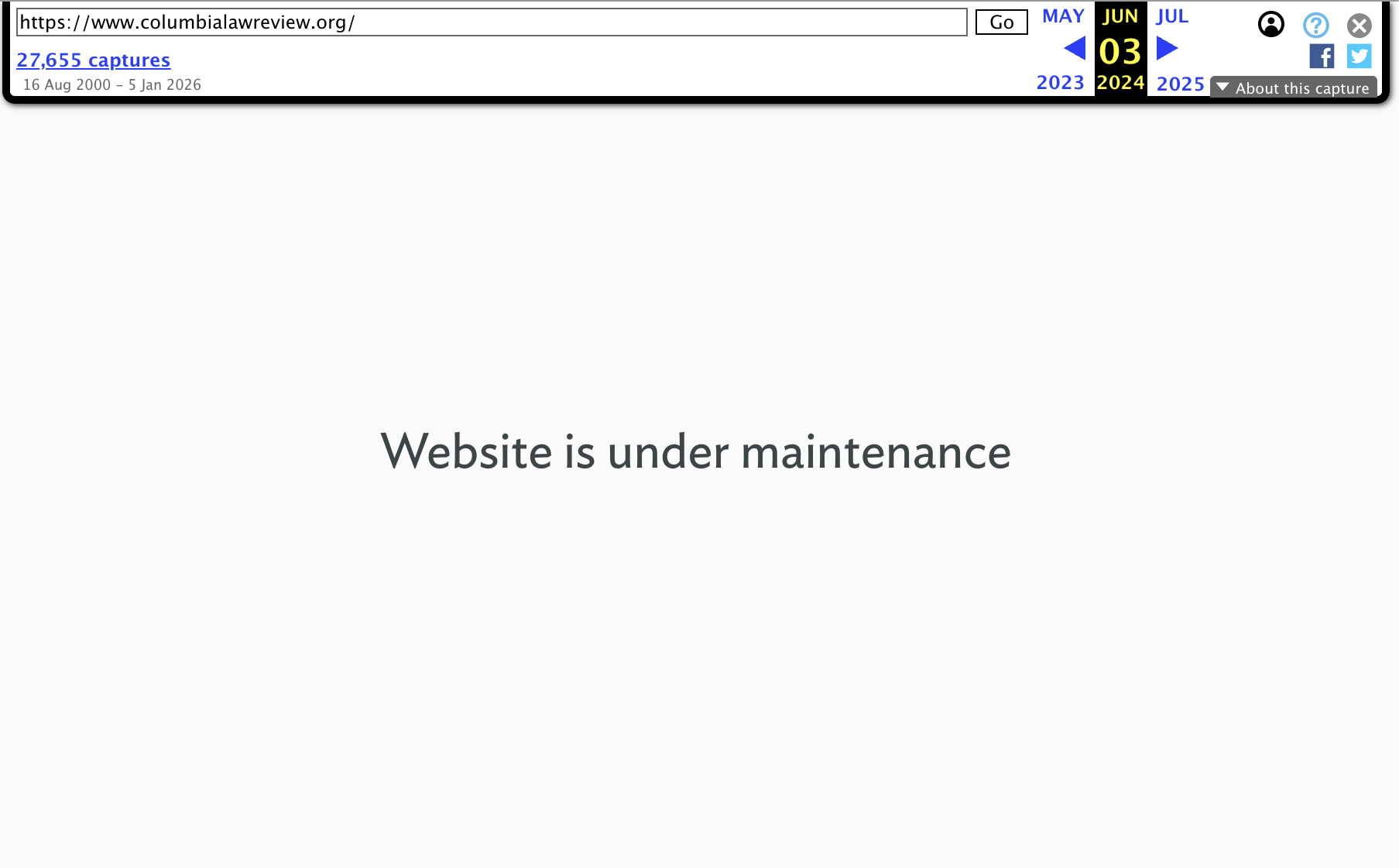
The board of directors of the Columbia Law Review took down its entire website hours after its editorial staff published Rabea Eghbariah's article "Toward Nakba as a Legal Concept". The website was reinstated after a 20-5 majority of staff editors voted to strike.

Seven hours after the Columbia Law Review published Eghbariah's article—a commissioned piece expanded from an essay commissioned then censored by the Harvard Law Review and later published in The Nation—its board of directors shut down the Columbia Law Review website, relenting only when the majority of editors threatened to strike.

==== August 8, 2024: Cas Holloway's apartment vandalized ====
Columbia Chief Operating Officer Cas Holloway's apartment building was vandalized with red paint and crickets at 3 a.m. Several flyers, including a wanted poster with Holloway's picture on it, were posted nearby.

==== August 14, 2024: Resignation of Minouche Shafik; Katrina Armstrong named interim president ====
Minouche Shafik suddenly resigned amid the turmoil on campus after 13 months and 13 days in office—the shortest tenure of any Columbia University president since 1801. Katrina Armstrong, who had been CEO of the Columbia University Irving Medical Center (CUIMC) and dean of the Vagelos College of Physicians and Surgeons, was appointed interim president, effective immediately.

==== August 21, 2024: House Committee on Education subpoena's Columbia for internal records related to the protests ====
Virginia Foxx of the United States House Committee on Education and Workforce sent Armstrong a letter to force Columbia to release documents to the federal government. It was the second time in the year and in its history that the committee sought to force a university to turn over internal records.

==== August 23, 2024: Armstrong announces creation of Office of Institutional Equity (OIE) and position of Rules Administrator ====
In a message to the Columbia community ahead of the fall 2024 semester, Armstrong announced the Office of Institutional Equity (OIE), a newly created office led by Vice Provost Laura Kirschstein, empowered to punish students and faculty it finds guilty of discrimination. It centralized the reporting of and investigations into cases of discrimination and harassment at Columbia, replacing the Office of Equal Opportunity and Affirmative Action (EOAA) and taking over its responsibilities. The OIE, functioning with non-transparent procedures, is authorized by the university to issue disciplinary notifications, suspensions, and expulsions, and to expel affiliates from university housing or revoke the degrees of graduates.

The message also announced the position of a new Rules Administrator, to which Gregory Wawro, formerly a professor of political science, was appointed.

==== August 25, 2024: Meta permanently deletes Columbia SJP's Instagram account ====
Meta permanently deleted Columbia SJP's Instagram account on August 25 when it had about 120,000 followers. SJP members also recalled Meta taking down several posts quoting Ghassan Kanafani.

==== August 30, 2024: Task Force on Antisemitism releases second report and considers anti-Zionism antisemitism ====
In late August, Columbia's Task Force on Antisemitism released a second report. News of the report was first published on June 16 in the Israeli newspaper Haaretz, in an interview with the task force's co-chairs, before any official communication from the university. In the report, the Task Force characterized anti-Zionism as antisemitism and said the university had failed to protect Jews in the university from violence and hate and that antisemitism carried out by both faculty and students had "affected the entire university community". In September, Columbia faculty published an open letter criticizing the task force's findings. At least 24 Jewish faculty members, 16 non-Jewish faculty members, some Jewish students, and others criticized the report for misrepresentations, omission of key context, and equating anti-Zionism with antisemitism.

=== Fall 2024 ===
==== September 4, 2024: "Shut it Down" picket on first day of class of the 2024–25 academic year ====
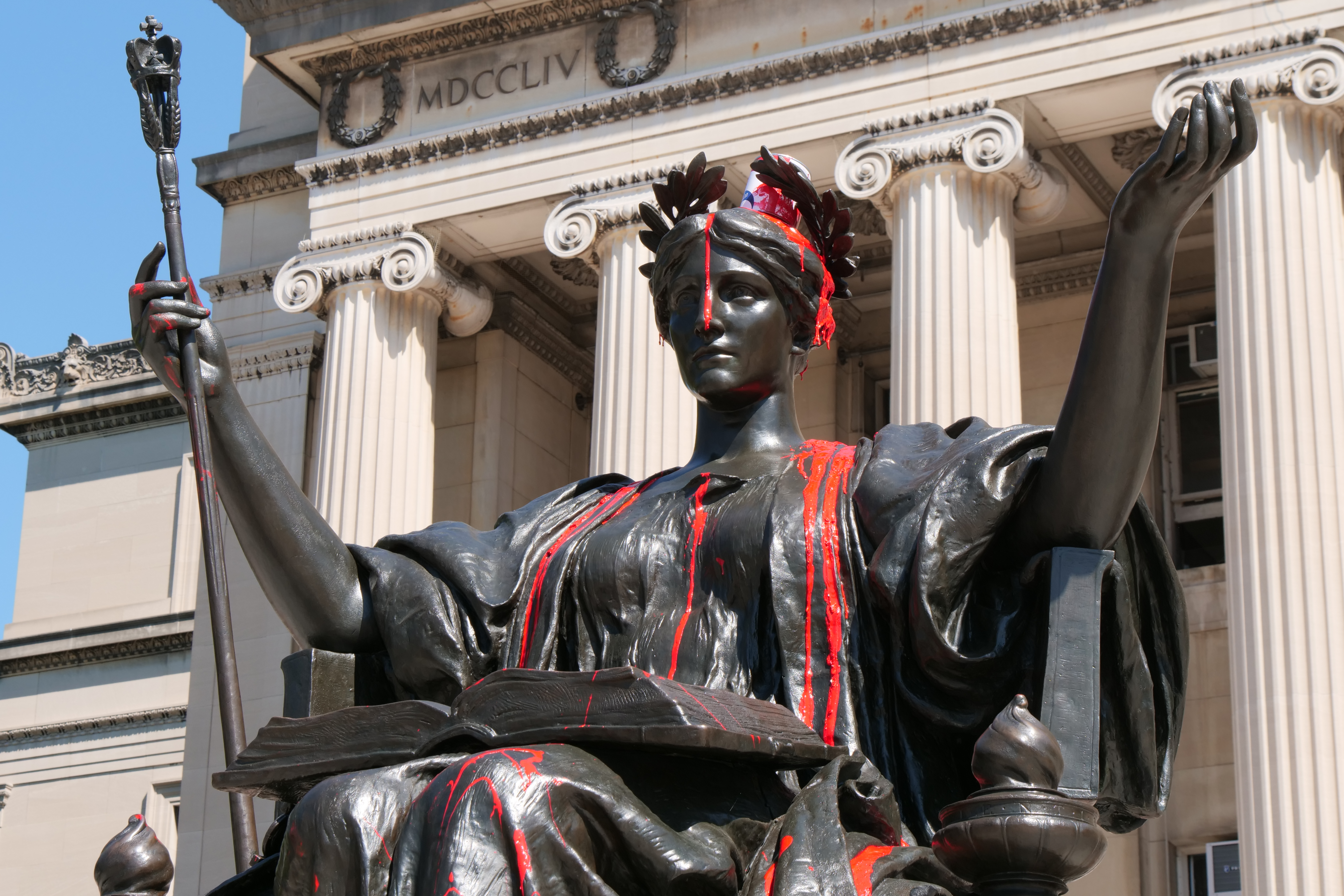
Alma Mater splattered with red paint on the first day of classes of the fall 2024 semester.

On the first day of classes of the 2024–25 academic year, dozens of protesters picketed the gates at 116th Street and Broadway in a protest organized by CUAD. On campus, someone dumped a can of red paint on the Alma Mater statue.

==== September 11, 2024: Barnard officially adopts policy of "institutional neutrality" ====
After months of practicing institutional neutrality on a provisional basis, Barnard College issued a statement on community expectations formally adopting the policy. Informed by the Chicago Principles, the policy was consonant with a pattern in which university administrators declined to explicitly take political positions during the protests and unrest on campuses during the Gaza War. In the examples given with the policy, the word "Zionist" was listed as a possible "code word" for Jewish and Israeli students that could violate rules against discrimination and harassment. The policy of institutional neutrality also affirmed the policy announced by Barnard's Dean Leslie Grinage the previous spring banning dorm decorations after some students used dorm decorations to express solidarity with Palestinians.

==== September 17, 2024: Armstrong creates President's Advisory Committee on Institutional Voice ====
Six days after Barnard formally adopted institutional neutrality, Columbia's interim president, Katrina Armstrong, announced the creation of the President's Advisory Committee on Institutional Voice to study the implementation of a policy of neutrality.

==== September 27, 2024: "All out for Lebanon" protest ====
After Israeli airstrikes in Lebanon that killed over 720 people, an "All Out for Lebanon" demonstration drew dozens to the Sundial following Benjamin Netanyahu's address to the UN General Assembly. CUAD urged participants to wear face coverings and to avoid using Columbia ID cards, due to prior administrative use of video surveillance and ID usage to identify and discipline demonstrators. A small group of pro-Israel counter-protesters responded with US and Israeli flags and national anthems, as well as chants against Hamas and Hezbollah.

==== October 7, 2024: Pro-Palestine student walkout, pro-Israel "Columbia United Against Terrorism" rally, and "Memory Lane" pro-Israel exhibition on the lawn ====
On the anniversary of the October 7 attacks and the beginning of the Gaza war, hundreds of pro-Palestine students gathered at Low Plaza after a walkout. They began quietly by continuing the daily vigils CUAD had started the previous week, in which those present listen in silence as the names of the over 50,000 Palestinian martyrs killed by Israel were read aloud. The protesters then chanted and shared poetry through people's mic, marched around Low Library and upper campus, and around 200 pro-Palestine students marched off campus to join a Within Our Lifetime protest, with some putting stickers on traffic signs and police patrol cars that read "I said I loved you and I wanted genocide to stop", a line from June Jordan's poem "Intifada Incantation: Poem #8 for b.b.L."

Around the same time, about a hundred pro-Israel demonstrators gathered on Broadway outside campus and waved Israeli flags and "Kidnapped from Israel" posters. On campus, Columbia Faculty and Staff Supporting Israel held a "Columbia United Against Terrorism" rally. The crowd held the Israeli and US flags and pro-Israel students spoke about the people who died at the Nova music festival. By the time the pro-Palestine students marched out of campus, the "Columbia United Against Terrorism" crowd had mostly scattered.

The pro-Israel "Memory Lane" exhibition, set up in the morning on the west side of the Butler lawn where students had established the second Gaza Solidarity encampment the previous spring, featured student art from Columbia Aryeh and the Columbia chapter of Students Supporting Israel and gigantic milk cartons with the names and faces of people Hamas took from Israel, a work titled "The Milk Carton Project" by Chicago realtor Jeff Aeder. Aeder also exhibited his installation in Chicago and at Harvard and Princeton.

==== October 15, 2024: Shai Davidai banned from campus ====
Israeli activist and assistant professor at Columbia Business School Shai Davidai had his campus access suspended for having "repeatedly harassed and intimidated University employees in violation of University policy." Davidai posted a video of himself in confrontation with Columba administrators Cas Holloway, Chief Operating Officer, and Bobby Lau, assistant director of Public Safety. In response, over 400 university professors, students, parents, alumni, and staff signed a letter to interim university president Katrina Armstrong calling Davidai's suspension "egregious". Davidai had been under formal investigation by the Office of Equal Opportunity and Affirmative Action (EOAA) since February 16, 2024, for several complaints of harassment from students.

==== October 19, 2024: Columbia Palestine Solidarity Coalition student group announced ====
The Columbia Palestine Solidarity Coalition (CPSC) announced itself as a "collective of Palestinian student organizers who wish to reclaim the pro-Palestinian student movement and recenter Palestine at Columbia University" in the Columbia Daily Spectator. It distinguished itself from CUAD, which it described as having "shifted from a horizontally structured coalition founded on Palestinian liberation to a nebulous organization that is not led by the affinity group of Palestinian student organizers."

==== October 16, 2024: Liberation Sukkah ====
Anti-Zionist Jewish students erected a sukkah with artwork featuring the Shivat Haminim, Handala, and lines from the poems "V'ahavta" ("And You Shall Love") by Aurora Levins Morales and "Intifada Incantation: Poem #8 for b.b.L." by June Jordan. Students sang Jewish prayers and songs in Hebrew including "Hashkiveinu", "Mi Chamocha", and "Oseh Shalom."

==== October 31, 2024: House Committee on Education and the Workforce publishes report ====
The US House Committee on Education and the Workforce, chaired by Virginia Foxx, published a report titled "Antisemitism on College Campuses Exposed" presenting its investigation into how Columbia and other schools responded to Palestine solidarity protests it described as antisemitic.

==== December 6, 2024: "Distraction by Design" protest at the Tree Lighting ====
For the second year in a row, students protested at Columbia's annual tree lighting ceremony on College Walk. The "Distraction by Design" protest condemned Columbia's refusal to divest from Israel and drew attention to Columbia trustee Jeh Johnson's position as former director of Lockheed Martin, the company that produces the AGM-114 Hellfire missiles used by Israeli Apache helicopters.

=== Spring 2025 ===
==== January 21, 2025: disruption of History of Modern Israel class on first day of spring semester ====
Students in keffiyehs disrupted a course called History of Modern Israel taught by visiting professor Avi Shilon, a former soldier in the Israeli military. In The Forward, Shilon wrote of the experience, "it made me feel like a Jew in a way I had never felt before" and that he experienced it "not as a threat to my existence, but rather as harassment".

==== February 21, 2025: first expulsions of students for Palestine solidarity protest action ====
On February 21, Barnard expelled two seniors for their alleged disruption of the course History of Modern Israel. On February 28, it expelled a third involved in the Hind's Hall occupation of Hamilton Hall. These were the first expulsions of nonviolent student protesters from Columbia in 89 years, since Robert Burke was expelled for leading a mock book burning protest in response Columbia's relationship with Nazi Germany. A petition to reinstate the Barnard students garnered over 120,000 signatures.

==== February 26, 2025: Barnard sit-in ====
In response to the expulsion of two students who protested an Israel class on campus, pro-Palestine students staged an on-campus sit-in near the office of Leslie Grinage, the dean of the Columbia-affiliated Barnard College. The demonstration came in the aftermath of more than 100,000 letters sent to the Barnard administration calling for a reversal of the expulsions. The protesters dedicated the gathering to Hind Rajab. On February 27, protesters began to picket outside Barnard's main gate, calling for the explusions' reversal. Shai Davidai started a counterprotest. The protesters disbanded but the NYPD arrested someone nearby shortly after.

==== March 4, 2025: Protest of Hillel event with Naftali Bennett ====
Over 100 protesters gathered to protest a closed-door event with former Israeli Prime Minister Naftali Bennett. The invitation email to the event, sponsored by Columbia Barnard Hillel and hosted by the SIPA Dean Keren Yarhi-Milo, said "The information in this email and the details of the event, including the identity of our guest, are confidential" and "the invitation is non-transferable, so please minimize discussing this event with others". A post promoting the protest said, "It is our duty to ensure that war criminals and genociders never feel welcomed on our campus, despite invitations from groups such as Hillel."

==== March 5, 2025: "Dr. Hussam Abu Safiya Liberated Zone" occupation of Milstein Center; bomb threat against protesters ====
On March 5, CUAD launched a sit-in protesting the expulsion of three students, two for disrupting the course "History of Modern Israel" at Columbia and one for involvement in the "Hind's Hall" occupation of Hamilton Hall in 2024. For the third time in a year, the administration summoned the NYPD to arrest students. Barnard officials reported there was a bomb threat and had the NYPD forcibly remove the protesters, arresting nine people. It was later established that the bomb threat was fake.

The next morning, a spokesperson for the NYPD said the police were responding to an "unscheduled demonstration" at Barnard, where, of about 75 pro-Palestine demonstrators, they arrested nine, who were charged with "obstructing governmental administration, trespass, and disorderly conduct". When asked whether the NYPD was responding to a bomb threat, the spokesperson said, "This is the only information I have."

Although official statements from Barnard and headlines of some local and national media outlets suggested that the protesters themselves were responsible for the bomb threat, the protesters were its stated targets. According to a screenshot obtained by The Intercept, an email sent to Barnard administrators declared an attack on the "anti-white faggot terrorists/communists that are protesting".

==== March 7, 2025: Trump administration cuts $400 million in funding to Columbia ====
Days after the Federal Task Force to Combat Antisemitism announced it was considering stop-work orders on $51.4 million in federal contracts with the university, the Trump administration announced a $400 million cut. Trump had publicly criticized Columbia 25 years earlier when it refused to purchase a property in Midtown from him for $400 million. According to The Atlantic, "with Trump's buy-in, [Stephen] Miller was ultimately the one who approved pulling federal funding from the school."

==== March 8, 2025: Detention of Mahmoud Khalil by ICE and threats by the Trump administration ====
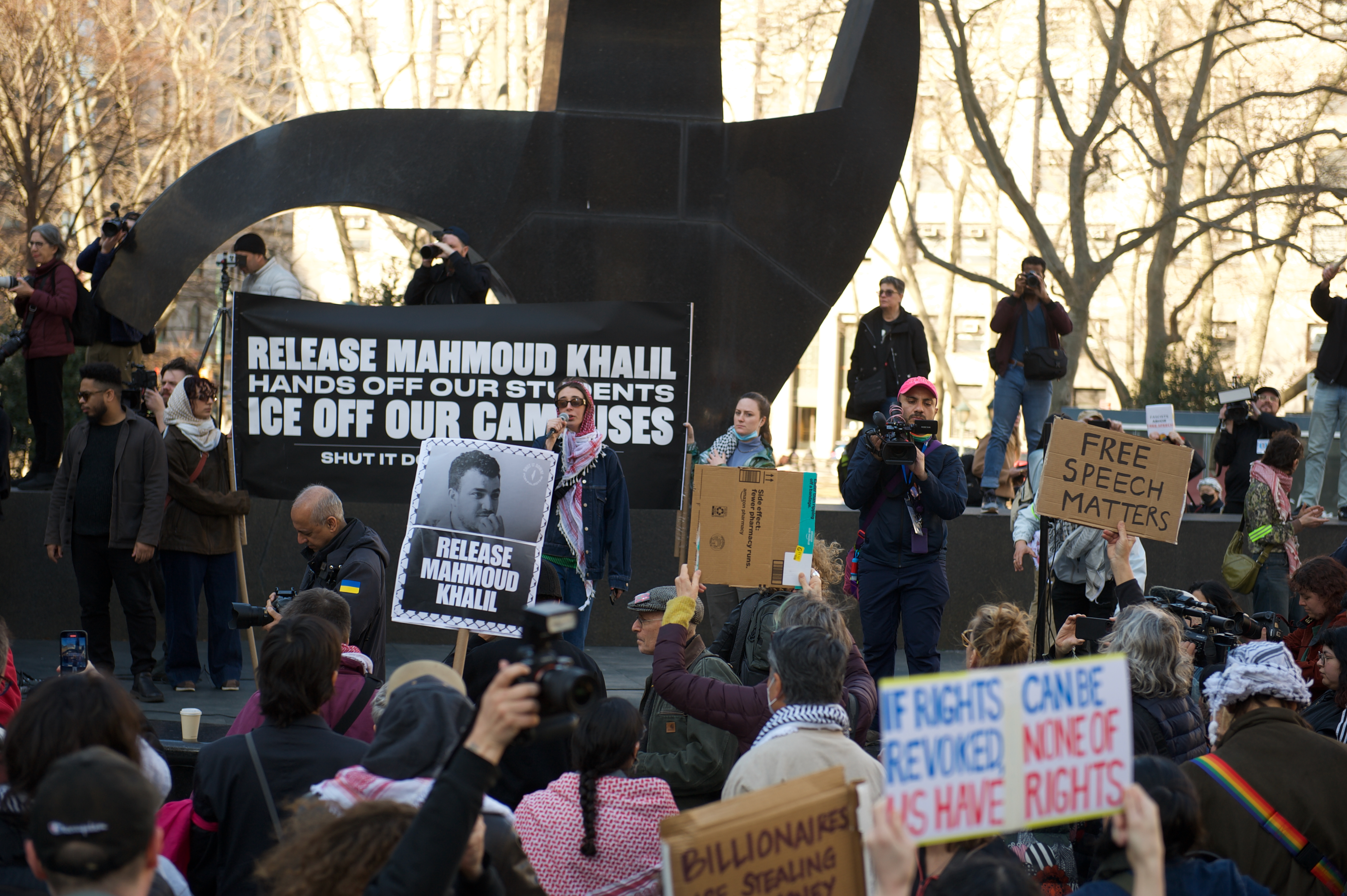
Protest against the detention of Mahmoud Khalil, New York City on March 10, 2025

Repression of pro-Palestinian protesters intensified in 2025 during the second presidency of Donald Trump, when the Trump administration announced the revocation of $400 million in federal funding for the school despite renewed efforts by Columbia to crack down on student protests through a new disciplinary committee. These efforts included the expulsion of students previously involved with pro-Palestine protests, and the temporary suspension and/or revocation of degrees for students who had already graduated. On March 9, Immigration and Customs Enforcement detained SIPA alumnus Mahmoud Khalil, a leading pro-Palestinian negotiator and lawful permanent resident. This followed an online campaign by pro-Israel groups and Shai Davidai to have him deported. Mohsen Mahdawi, another Palestinian member of the Columbia University community, was arrested for deportation soon after.

==== March 10, 2025: federal agents revoke permanent residency of Yunseo Chung, search her dorm and other Columbia residences ====
Yunseo Chung, a Columbia University student and lawful permanent resident with a green card, was among a group of protesters arrested during the "Dr. Hussam Abu Safiya Liberated Zone" occupation of Milstein Center. Charges against Chung were dropped. On March 10, federal law enforcement told her lawyer that her permanent resident status was being revoked. Federal agents searched her dorm and her parents' home, but did not find her. Chung's lawyer filed a petition for a writ of habeas corpus in the District Court for the Southern District of New York, and the case was assigned to judge Naomi Reice Buchwald, who ruled that Chung could not be detained for the time being.

==== March 11, 2025: "Jews Say ICE Off Campus" protest; doctoral candidate Ranjani Srinivasan forced to leave US ====
Dozens of Jewish students wearing "Jews say ICE off campus" protested in front of Alma Mater in protest of the detention of Mahmoud Khalil and the presence of Immigration and Customs Enforcement (ICE) agents on campus.

Ranjani Srinivasan, an Indian national, Fulbright scholar, and doctoral candidate at Columbia, was forced to leave the US due to threats from the Trump administration. Srinivasan chose to self-deport after having her visa revoked. She had previously been detained during the Hamilton Hall protests, but all charges were dismissed. Her attorney said she was not a participant in the protests. Srinivasan was also accused without evidence of being a Hamas supporter.

==== March 13, 2025: Expulsions, degree revocations, and suspensions for Gaza Solidarity Encampment and Hind's Hall student protesters ====
The Columbia University Judicial Board (UJB) issued a statement announcing expulsions, multiple-year suspensions, and degree revocations for students involved in the Gaza Solidarity Encampment and Hind's Hall occupation of Hamiltion Hall, two days after Rules Administrator Gregory Wawro announced that hearings had been completed. Although these announcements came after the Trump administration demanded this exact kind of punishment, Wawro expressed confidence that the community would "accept the legitimacy of the outcomes, whatever they may be, since we followed our longstanding practices and policies under the Rules."

Most of the cases had been transferred from the Center for Student Success and Intervention (CSSI)—a body established in 2022 providing fewer protections for students and from which the university outsources the disciplinary process to Debevoise & Plimpton, a private law firm—to the UJB, a body established after the 1968 protests and under the University Senate's purview.

Columbia punished 22 students, all of whom were cleared of any criminal charges, with expulsions, multiple-year suspensions, or degree revocations. Among those Columbia expelled was Grant Miner, a PhD student and president of the Student Workers of Columbia—UAW 2710 union, which was due to begin its contract bargaining with Columbia the next day. On March 2, 2026, New York Supreme Court Justice Gerald Lebovits dismissed Columbia's punishment of 22 students, undergraduates and graduates, involved in the Hind's Hall occupation of Hamilton Hall, ruling that Columbia used inadmissible evidence—arrest records sealed in June 2024 when Manhattan District Attorney Alvin Bragg dropped criminal charges against the protesters—in disciplinary hearings later that summer. Lebovits called the sanctions against students "arbitrary and capricious" and said they violated university rules and state law. Columbia said it was "considering all of its options, including seeking a stay of the order and appealing the decision."

==== March 14, 2025: Trump administration issues preconditions for funding negotiations ====
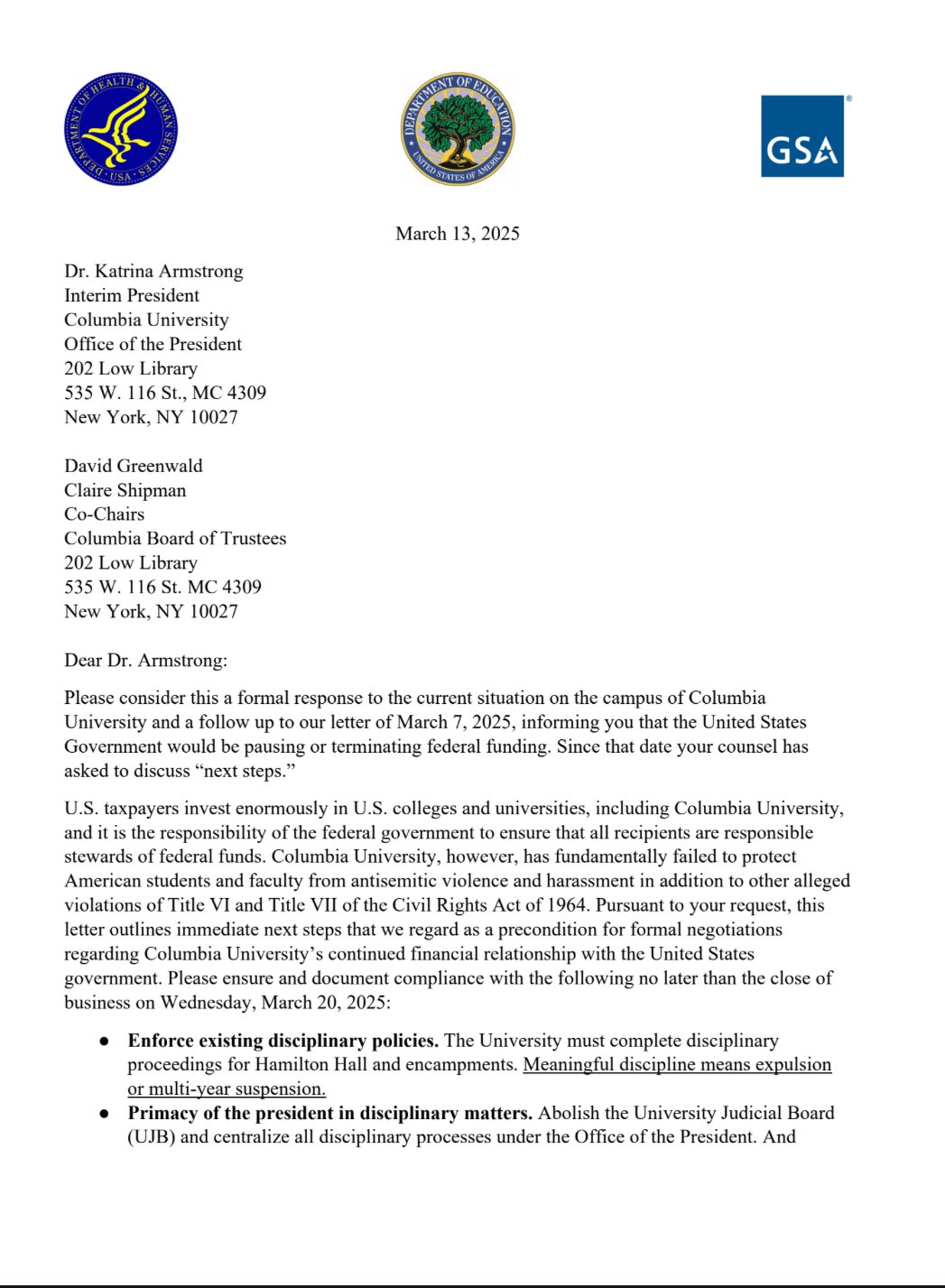
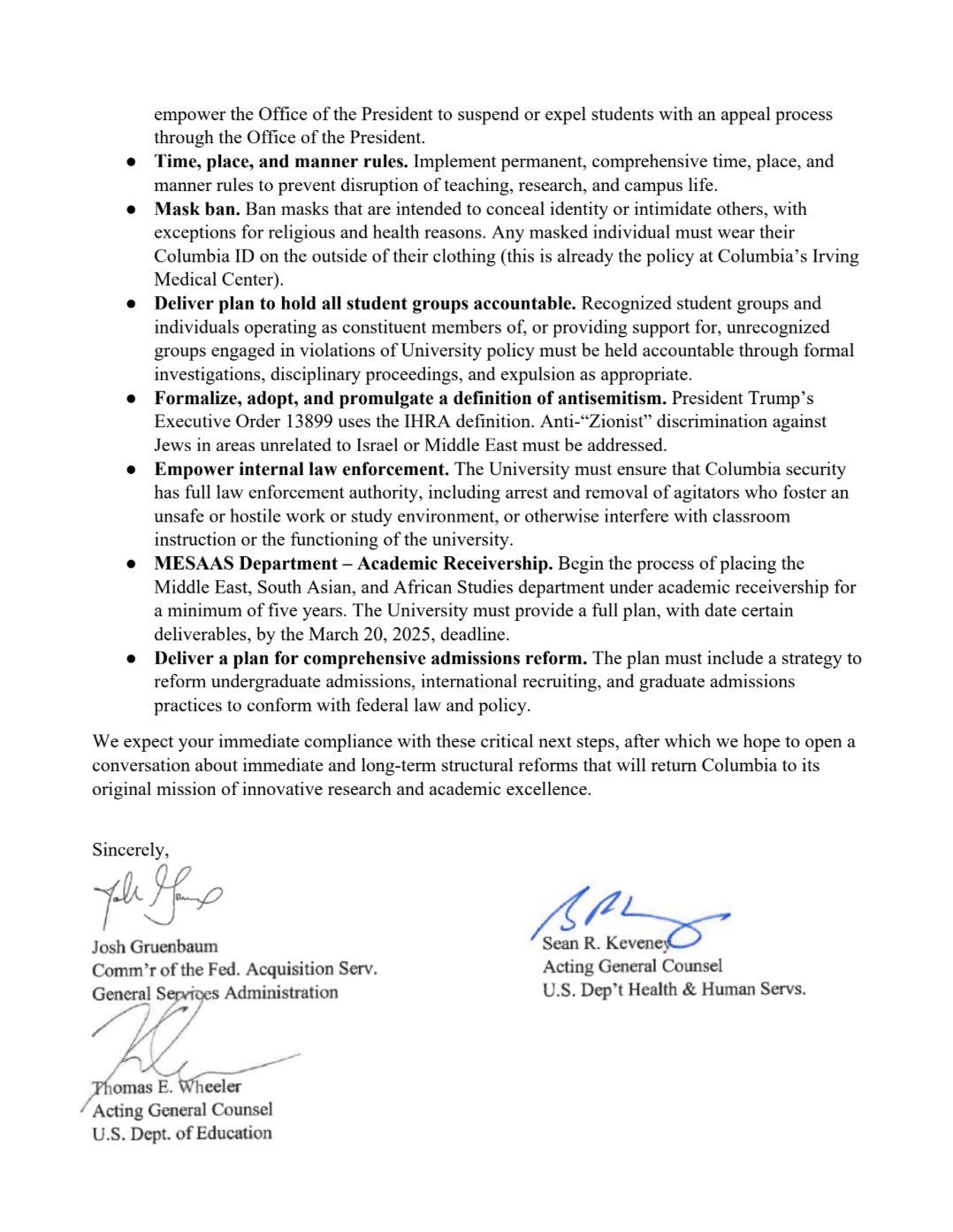
Letter to Columbia University interim president Katrina Armstrong and co-chairs of the board of trustees David Greenwald and Claire Shipman containing the Trump administration's list of demands.

On March 14, Columbia received a letter from the Trump administration listing a number of demands to be met as "a precondition for formal negotiations" for federal funding, after the administration cut $400 million in federal grants and funding. The demands included expulsion or multi-year suspensions as punishment for pro-Palestinian demonstrators; a mask ban; the abolishment of the University Judicial Board in order to "centralize all disciplinary processes" under the university president; placing the Middle East, South Asia, and African Studies (MESAAS) department under academic receivership; adopting a controversial definition of antisemitism; and giving campus police "full law enforcement authority", including to make arrests. Professor Katherine Franke and others called it a "ransom note". Columbia agreed to these demands.

==== March 20, 2025: Columbia's administration acquiesces to Trump's demands ====
On March 20, the university announced several policy measures intended to address the demands. These included restructuring the university's disciplinary system, hiring 36 police officers empowered to make arrests, and appointing a senior vice provost to supervise the Middle Eastern, South Asian, and African Studies (MESAAS) department. According to the announcement, the senior vice provost would conduct "a thorough review of the portfolio of programs in regional areas across the University, starting immediately with the Middle East."

==== March 28, 2025: Armstrong steps down; board of trustees co-chair Claire Shipman made president ====
Although it had recently expressed satisfaction with Armstrong's measures enacted to restore federal funding, a statement from the Trump administration's Joint Task Force to Combat Antisemitism called Armstrong's resignation "an important step toward advancing negotiations" between the government and the university and referred to a "concerning revelation" earlier that week, ostensibly a call with faculty in which she downplayed Columbia's commitment to its concessions to the Trump administration.

Board of trustees co-chair David Greenwald announced that interim president Katrina Armstrong was stepping down and that the other co-chair, Claire Shipman, would serve as acting president of the university. Greenwald became the sole chair of the board of trustees.

==== March 31, 2025: Columbia University Senate publishes The Sundial Report ====
The Sundial Report, a 335–page chronology of the 2023-24 protests at Columbia, was prepared by a group within the Columbia University Senate, a policymaking body composed of faculty members and students. The University Senate, established after the 1968 Columbia University protests to further shared governance at the university, is independent of the university's administration, and its report was critical of how the administration handled the protests. For example, the report found that the "Hind's Hall" occupation of Hamilton Hall could have ended without calling in the NYPD.

==== March 31, 2025: Meta bans CUAD Instagram account ====
On March 31, Students for a Democratic Society announced in an Instagram post that Meta banned the CUAD Instagram account as well as its backup accounts. Meta also previously permanently deleted the account of Columbia's SJP when it had 120,000 followers.

==== April 2, 2025: Jewish students chain themselves to campus gates ====
Jewish students chained themselves to the gates outside of St. Paul's Chapel on the east side of campus in protest of the ICE jailing of Mahmoud Khalil. At around 2 p.m., Public Safety officers cut the locks and forced protesters outside the gates, after which the protesters sat down in front of the gates, locked arms, and dispersed around 4 p.m. At about 4:20, several students chained themselves to the gates outside Earl Hall, on the campus's west side. One said the protest was to "demand that the University release the information of who gave over Mahmoud Khalil's name, how that happened, so that we can demand accountability from our University and protect our students from the federal government".

==== April 10, 2025: Trump administration considers placing Columbia under federal oversight with consent decree ====
The Wall Street Journal reported that the Trump administration sought to install federal oversight of Columbia University with a consent decree. After Harvard University rejected such demands from the Trump administration, even after it threatened Harvard with over $9 billion in cuts to federal grants and contracts, according to Inside Higher Ed, Columbia appeared to "tacitly reject" the proposal after having already made significant concessions to the Trump administration.

==== April 14, 2025: Detention of Mohsen Mahdawi ====
Mohsen Mahdawi of the School of General Studies was detained by U.S. Immigration and Customs Enforcement (ICE) agents in a trap set at the U.S. Citizenship and Immigration Services office in Burlington, Vermont, where United States Citizenship and Immigration Services had informed him he had an interview to obtain U.S. citizenship.

According to Drop Site News, the State Department drew on Columbia's mischaracterization of the November 9, 2023, protest, taking language from the university's description of the protest as pretext to deport Mahdawi. In a statement the day after the November 9 protest announcing the suspension of Students for Justice in Palestine and Jewish Voice for Peace, Gerald Rosberg, then a senior administrator at Columbia, called it an "unauthorized event" that included "threatening rhetoric and intimidation". The claim that the "threatening rhetoric and intimidation" came from SJP and JVP was debunked by journalists and retracted by Rosberg privately in a University Senate Plenary on November 17, 2023, but Columbia never issued a public statement to correct and clarify the matter. The phrase "threatening rhetoric and intimidation" appeared verbatim in memo from Secretary of State Marco Rubio, which said that Mahdawi "engaged in threatening rhetoric and intimidation of pro-Israeli bystanders" without further detail.

==== April 18, 2025: Shipman announces review of the University Senate shortly after assuming presidency ====
After participating in her first meeting with the University Senate and delivering her first address as acting president on April 4, Claire Shipman, who left her position as co-chair of the board of trustees to become acting president of the university on March 28, announced in an email to the Columbia University community that the University Senate would be subject to review. According to The New York Times, the move was an "effort to potentially diminish the university senate's authority" and one that Shipman and the trustees used "vague language" to explain.

==== April 21, 2025: protesters chain themselves to Columbia gates in response to ICE detentions of students ====
About 10 demonstrators chained themselves to Columbia's gates at 116th Street and Amsterdam Avenue to protest the detention of Mohsen Mahadawi and Mahmoud Khalil.

==== April 22, 2025: plans for student encampment leaked and published by NBC ====
Matt Lavietes reported for NBC News that Columbia students were planning to establish an encampment that week. More than 100 protesters met at a community center off campus to organize the first tent encampments on campus in almost a year, but when the appointed time came, the group did not set up encampments.

==== May 7, 2025: "Basel Al-Araj Popular University" occupation of Butler Library ====
Pro-Palestinian protesters entered and took over Room 301, the main reading room at Butler Library, at around 3:15 pm, naming it the "Basel Al-Araj Popular University" for Bassel al-Araj. Columbia Public Safety security guards blocked the reading room exit and required the protesters to show their university identification or face arrest for trespassing, creating a standoff. At 6:55 pm, acting president Claire Shipman summoned the NYPD to remove the protesters, of whom police in riot gear arrested 78—the fourth mass arrest at Columbia University in 18 months and the largest since April 2024, when the NYPD arrested 109 in its sweep of the "Hind's Hall" occupation of Hamilton Hall and the second Gaza Solidarity Encampment. The policing and suppression of the protest has been described as forceful, violent, and aggressive, with two people brought out in stretchers, one of them wearing a kuffiyeh draped over their face. Shipman praised the NYPD and Public Safety for what she called their "professionalism".

Following the incident, the university suspended over 65 students and barred 33 others, including those from affiliated institutions such as Barnard College, from entering the campus. Student journalists for Columbia Daily Spectator and WKCR were among those given notices of interim suspension.

The protest and subsequent arrests garnered national attention. US Secretary of State Marco Rubio called the protesters "trespassers and vandals" and "pro-Hamas thugs" and announced that the Trump administration would review their visa statuses. The Trump administration praised Columbia's response as showing "fortitude and conviction", highlighting the enforcement of campus policies amid federal scrutiny over the university's handling of antisemitism allegations.

Civil liberties organizations expressed concern over potential infringements of free speech and the right to protest. A letter from the executive committee of the American Association of University Professors (AAUP) at Columbia deplored the "erosion of shared governance" as it denounced the university's decision to call the NYPD for assistance.

==== May 20–21, 2025: boos and jeers at 2025 commencement ====
External videos
- Columbia University students jeer during commencement ceremony speech by Claire Shipman

On May 20, 2025, during her speech at the Columbia College class day ceremony, Shipman was greeted with jeers and boos, as well as chants of "free Mahmoud" in reference to Mahmoud Khalil, a graduate held in detention since U.S. Immigration and Customs Enforcement (ICE) agents detained him at his Columbia residence on March 8. At the university's main commencement ceremony the next day, there were also boos, jeers, and chants of "free Palestine" from the crowd of graduates during her speech, in which she said that "many in our community today are mourning the absence of our graduate Mahmoud Khalil."

=== Summer 2025 ===
==== May 22, 2025: Trump administration accuses Columbia of violating Jewish students' rights ====
The Department of Health and Human Services accused Columbia of violating Jewish students' rights as proscribed by Title VI of the Civil Rights Act of 1964.

==== June 4, 2025: Department of Education says Columbia does not meet accreditation standards ====
The US Department of Education said Columbia failed to meet accreditation standards due to what it described as a failure to protect Jewish students on campus, a violation of federal anti-discrimination laws.

==== July 15, 2025: Shipman announces Columbia will adopt IHRA definition and partner with the ADL ====
Amid negotiations with the Trump administration over $400 million of federal funding it withdrew from Columbia, acting president Claire Shipman announced that Columbia would adopt the IHRA definition of antisemitism and partner with the Anti-Defamation League (ADL). In the negotiations, Trump's team was led by Stephen Miller and Columbia was represented by Jay Lefkowitz and Matt Owen of the law firm Kirkland & Ellis. Professor Rashid Khalidi cited Columbia's adoption of the IHRA definition as the reason he cancelled his fall lecture course History of the Modern Middle East.

==== July 22, 2025: UJB punishes over 70 students with expulsions, suspensions, and degree revocations ====
While Columbia was in negotiations with the Trump administration, its University Judicial Board issued expulsions, suspensions, and degree revocations to over 70 students who participated in the "Basel Al-Araj Popular University" occupation of Butler Library.

==== July 23, 2025: Columbia settles with Trump administration and agrees to pay $220 million ====
The day after issuing 70 expulsions, suspensions, and degree revocations to students, Columbia finalized negotiations with the Trump administration and agreed to pay the federal government a $220 million settlement. As part of the deal, Columbia agreed to provide the federal government with the private information of applicants to the university—those admitted as well as those not admitted—including their race, GPA, and standardized test scores. In October, Shipman announced that Jim Glover, an administrator at the Climate School, would assume the role of resolution administrator and vice provost per settlement terms, and would report to Bart Schwartz, a third-party monitor for the settlement. Columbia sent an "initial set of information" including admissions data conveying "both rejected and admitted students broken down by race, color, grade point average, and performance on standardized tests" as well as the university's "training materials to socialize all students". Critics of the settlement have called the government's actions "extortion" and Columbia's actions "capitulation." American Association of University Professors president Todd Wolfson called the settlement "an unprecedented disaster".

As part of the settlement with the Trump administration, Columbia established a claims fund worth $21 million for Jewish employees reporting that they experienced antisemitism at the university. The fund is a settlement of the Title VII investigation of the university from the federal government's Equal Employment Opportunity Commission (EEOC), which will also decide Jewish employees' eligibility for compensation and how much money each will receive. The EEOC started investigating Columbia for antisemitism when its chair, Andrea R. Lucas, filed a formal discrimination complaint against Columbia in June 2024. Some faculty members, including James Schamus, criticized the fund and questioned whether Jewish professors would be given compensation if they supported the Gaza Solidarity Encampment.

==== August 8, 2025: Trustees file charge against union; Columbia recruits external lecturers ====
The Trustees of Columbia University filed an unfair labor practice charge against the student worker union, Student Workers of Columbia - UAW Local 2710, for violating the National Labor Relations Act of 1935 by not bargaining in "good faith" with regard to contract renegotiation, citing the union's insistence that the union president—Grant Miner, whom Columbia expelled in March 2025, the day before contract negotiations were to begin, for alleged rules violations in the Hind's Hall occupation of Hamilton Hall in April 2024 and whose appeal Claire Shipman terminated before consideration—be present and participate in the union's bargaining with the administration. Columbia also canceled prestigious preceptorships for senior doctoral students to give classes in the Core Curriculum and recruited external lecturers to fill these positions weeks before the fall 2025 semester. In an open letter, the union called the administration's conduct "textbook union busting."

=== Fall 2025 ===
==== November 10, 2025: Institute of Global Politics honors Yitzhak Rabin with Bill Clinton; students protest off campus ====
The Institute of Global Politics hosted an event titled "Yitzhak Rabin, 30 Years On: His Legacy and the Challenges of Peace", honoring former Israeli Prime Minister Yitzhak Rabin and commemorating the Oslo Accords. Bill Clinton spoke on a panel with Keren Yarhi-Milo, Hillary Clinton, Jacob Lew, Nadav Eyal, and Dennis Ross, with opening remarks by Columbia President Claire Shipman. Over 30 protesters gathered with a banner reading "war criminal off our campus" at the edge of Morningside Park outside Faculty House, where the event was being held.

==== November 12, 2025: Administration cancels Olive Harvest Festival cultural event ====
In the context of its crackdown on protests, after scrutinizing sponsor affiliations, promotional materials, and mandating time and location changes, Columbia's administration cancelled a planned Palestinian cultural event hours before it was due to take place on Butler Plaza. It was held outside the 116th Street gates instead.

==== November 16, 2025: Advisory Committee on investment rejects proposals for divesting from Israel ====
Columbia's Advisory Committee on Socially Responsible Investing (ACSRI) announced its rejection of three proposals from the 2024–2025 academic year to divest from Israel or companies that "engage in, profit from, or support Gross Violations of Human Rights and International Law, including war crimes". ACSRI criteria for consideration require what it calls "broad consensus within the University community". On February 29, 2024, ACSRI had rejected CUAD's December 2023 proposal to divest from Israel, which ACSRI said failed to reach broad consensus. The Columbia College student body passed a referendum in favor of divestment from Israel with 76.55% in support and a 40.26% voter participation rate. ACSRI said that Columbia College was but 1 of 17 schools and that the university community was not only current students but "all living alumni, faculty, and students".

=== Spring 2026 ===
==== January 25, 2026: Trustees appoint Jennifer Mnookin as university president ====
Columbia's office of the secretary announced that the board of trustees had chosen Jennifer Mnookin, the chancellor of the University of Wisconsin-Madison, as the next president of Columbia. Mnookin is expected to begin her tenure on July 1, 2026, replacing acting president and former co-chair of the board of trustees Claire Shipman. After a series of administrative turnovers, Mnookin will be the university's fifth president in four years, after Lee Bollinger, Minouche Shafik, Katrina Armstrong, and Shipman.

==== February 6, 2026: Professors and students arrested at anti-ICE demonstration ====
NYPD arrested 12 Columbia professors and students in a street blockade on Broadway demanding ICE off campus and the reinstatement of Columbia as a sanctuary campus. According to the Columbia Spectator, demonstrators "called on the University to stop sharing student, faculty, and staff information with the Department of Homeland Security and other law enforcement agencies; remove members of the board of trustees who have 'enabled the Trump administration’s repression of noncitizens'; end the surveillance and discipline of students for political activity; and clarify how the University has implemented its $221 million agreement with the Trump administration." Jennifer S. Hirsch, a professor among those arrested, said, "Columbia was the test case for this government strategy of kidnapping people first and then asking questions later", referring to Columbia affiliates apprehended by federal agents, including Mahmoud Khalil, Mohsen Mahdawi, and Yunseo Chung.

==== February 2026: in wake of Trump demands, provost's Middle East studies review committee issues first report ====
Ten months after Columbia announced it would conduct a "thorough review" of its Middle East studies programs after the Trump administration withdrew $400 million in funding from the university, the provost’s regional review committee, led by Miguel Urquiola, issued a report calling for a suite of changes to a number of regional studies programs to be overseen and administered by the university's Committee on Global Thought. Among these changes is a push to expand programs relating to Israel.

==== February 26, 2026: federal agents detain another Columbia affiliate from university residence ====
The day after the Columbia student workers' union, SWC-UAW Local 2710, held an "ICE Off Campus" rally at the Sundial demanding the release of Leqaa Kordia and Columbia's reinstatement as a sanctuary campus, armed Department of Homeland Security agents impersonated the NYPD and pretended to be searching for a missing child to gain entry to the Columbia-owned residential building and detain Elmina Aghayeva, a neuroscience student in Columbia's School of General Studies. President Shipman acknowledged the detention in a university-wide email. Though Columbia affiliates, including Mahmoud Khalil, had been detained by federal agents before, this was the first time a Columbia president acknowledged providing legal support to a detained student. Aghayeva was released after Mayor Zohran Mamdani brought up the case in a meeting with President Donald Trump.

==== April 2026: Columbia investigates student for flyers critical of trustees and administrators ====
After a student brought flyers criticizing trustees, administrators, and figures it called "ghost trustees" to a forum on shared governance hosted by the University Senate in March, the Office of Institutional Equity (OIE) emailed the student, calling them into a mandatory meeting. Two days later, Columbia released a public statement that said it was "deeply disappointing that flyers were distributed last week singling out community members by name and photograph" with what it called "inaccurate and inflammatory claims". After public pressure, the OIE followed up with an email to the student announcing that the investigation would be "administratively closed" after an initial interview, meaning that the case would be dropped.

==== April 23, 2026: report on University Senate review released; trustees announce internal changes ====
The co-chairs of the board of trustees, David Greenwald and Jeh Johnson, released a report on the review of the University Senate, including 15 recommendations, along with four internal changes to trustee processes.

The review of the University Senate—first announced by Claire Shipman on April 18, 2025, weeks after leaving her position as co-chair of the board of trustees to become acting president of the university—culminated in a report released April 2026, though dated December 2025.

== Protests at other university campuses ==
Demonstrations initially spread in the United States on April 22, when students at several universities on the East Coast—including New York University, Yale University, Emerson College, the Massachusetts Institute of Technology (MIT), and Tufts University—began occupying campuses, as well as experiencing mass arrests in New York and at Yale. Protests emerged throughout the U.S. in the following days, with protest camps established on over 40 campuses. On April 25, mass arrests occurred at Emerson College, the University of Southern California, and the University of Texas at Austin.

A continued crackdown on April 27 led to approximately 275 arrests at Washington, Northeastern, Arizona State, and Indiana University Bloomington. Several professors were among those detained at Emory University, and at Washington University in St. Louis, university employees were arrested. On April 28, counter-protests were held at MIT, the University of Pennsylvania, and the University of California, Los Angeles (UCLA). On April 30, approximately 300 protesters were arrested at Columbia University and City College of New York; and pro-Israel counter-protesters attacked the UCLA campus occupation. The following day over 200 arrests were made at UCLA.

Hundreds of arrests ensued in May, notably (Note: As defined by CNN map of "Campus protests where arrests have been made since April 18", highlighting schools with 45 or more total arrests.) at the Art Institute of Chicago, University of California, San Diego, the Fashion Institute of Technology in New York, and University of California, Irvine. On May 20, the first strike by academic workers took place on campuses in California at UC Santa Cruz, followed by UC Davis and UCLA on May 28.

== Responses ==
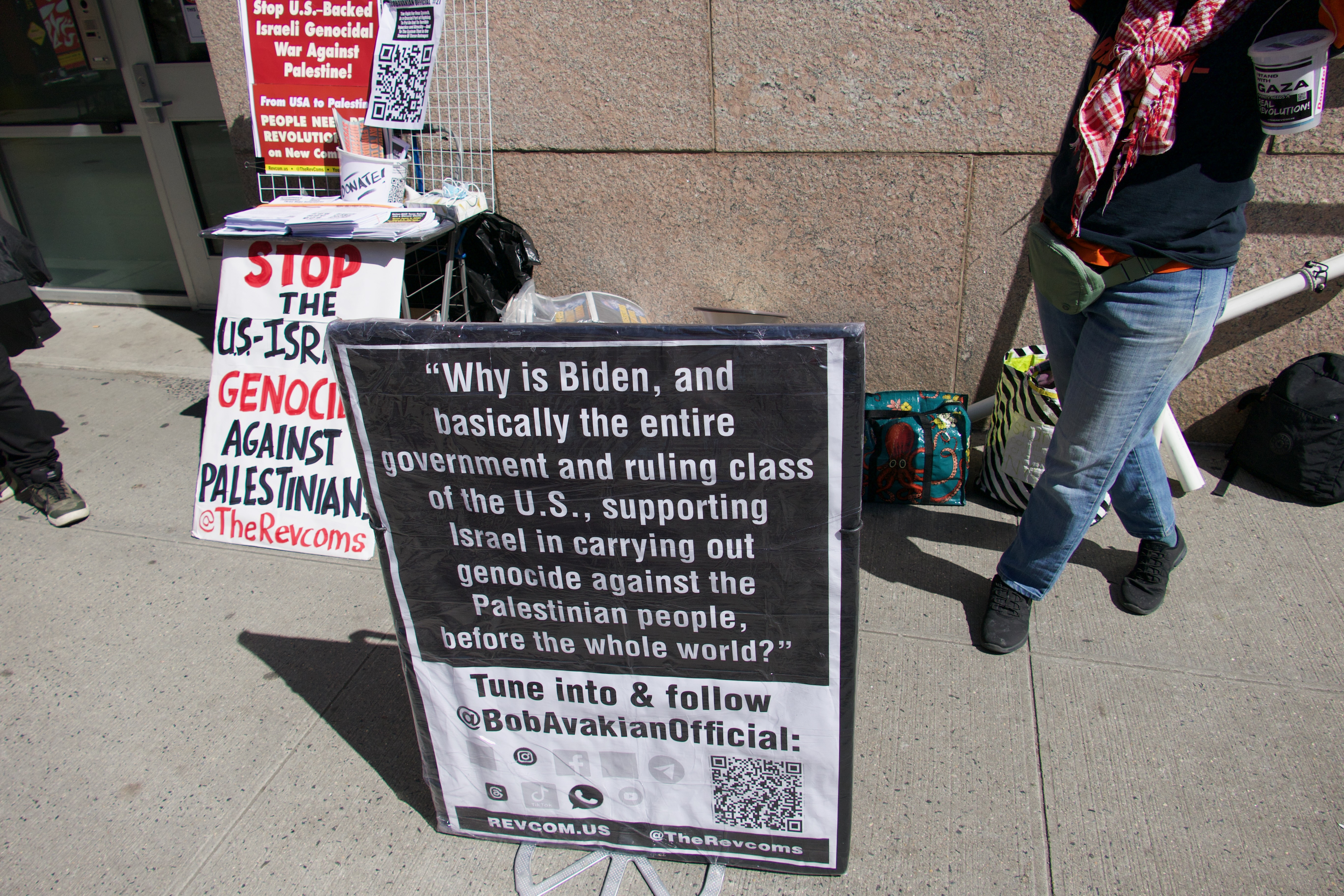
Protest outside Columbia University highlighting Biden administration's complicity in Gaza genocide, April 22, 2024

=== Statements ===
In early November 2023, the popular Israeli TV program Eretz Nehederet satirized the protests at "Columbia Untisemity", calling them "pro-Hamas". The clip passed 17 million views. U.S. Representative Jerrold Nadler, a Columbia alumnus and the House of Representatives' longest-serving Jewish member, wrote, "Columbia has an obligation to protect students and their learning environment". New York City mayor Eric Adams said, "Students have a right to free speech but do not have a right to violate university policies and disrupt learning on campus". President Joe Biden referenced the protests in his statement on Passover, saying, "harassment and calls for violence against Jews ... has absolutely no place on college campuses". A separate White House statement condemned "physical intimidation targeting Jewish students and the Jewish community" on Columbia's campus. Former president and presumptive Republican nominee Donald Trump said: "The police came in and in exactly two hours, everything was over. It was a beautiful thing to watch."

Ocasio-Cortez wrote on X: "Calling in police enforcement on non-violent demonstrations of young students on campus is an escalatory, reckless, and dangerous act. It represents a heinous failure of leadership that puts people’s lives at risk. I condemn it in the strongest possible terms." U.N. special rapporteur on human rights defenders Mary Lawlor called Columbia's threat to suspend students for not ending the encampment "a clear violation of their right to peaceful assembly". In March 2025, during the second Trump administration, Mahmoud Khalil, an organizer of the campus protest, was arrested by ICE. The same month, ICE attempted to arrest another student.

In February 2025, Leo Terrell, the chair of the Department of Justice's Task Force to Combat Antisemitism, announced that he would investigate Columbia University as part of the Department of Justice's broader investigation into antisemitism on college campuses.

=== At Columbia ===
The union representing Columbia student workers released a statement calling for "the immediate reinstatement of all student and student workers disciplined for pro-Palestine protests and the end to the repression of protest on Columbia's campus".

An editor of the Columbia Daily Spectator, Milène Klein, said that alarmists were portraying the protest as centered on antisemitism. The Columbia Faculty of Arts and Sciences policy and planning committee condemned outside media coverage of the protest as "sensationalistic" and said it was "distressed by reports that conflate on-campus protests with the actions of bad actors from outside of our community", while condemning all forms of discrimination.

Roger J. Landry, the chaplain of Columbia's Catholic student center, said the protests were being organized by "explicitly Communist outside agitators". He called the protests "malevolent" and "antisemitic".

Columbia Law School professors condemned the mass arrests as well as the suspensions of students in a letter to the university's leadership, calling the actions taken by Columbia's administration "concerning" and saying they "lack transparency".

In mid-August, Columbia President Minouche Shafik and three deans resigned. Shafik cited "a period of turmoil where it has been difficult to overcome divergent views across our community".

In July 2025, the university disciplined at least 70 students who took part in campus protests with probation, suspensions, degree revocations, and expulsions.

=== Donors and federal funding ===
In October 2023, Leon Cooperman vowed to cut off his donations to Columbia. Columbia alumnus and former trustee Robert Kraft, who founded Columbia's Kraft Center for Jewish Student Life, announced on April 22: "I am no longer confident that Columbia can protect its students and staff and I am not comfortable supporting the university until corrective action is taken." According to Adam Saifer and Fahad Ahmad, Kraft is among "billionaire donors" who "have used their vast wealth—and the threat of withdrawing it—to demand a severe crackdown on student protesters expressing solidarity with Palestine" since October 2023. Angelica Berrie of the Russell Berrie Foundation suspended donations on April 26, but did not publicly announce it. Mortimer Zuckerman also suspended his donations to the university.

In March 2025, days after the federal government's Joint Task Force to Combat Anti-Semitism announced it was considering stop-work orders on $51.4 million in contracts with the university, the Trump administration announced a $400 million cut. Trump had publicly criticized Columbia 25 years earlier when it refused to purchase a property in Midtown from him for $400 million. According to The Atlantic, "with Trump's buy-in, [Stephen] Miller was ultimately the one who approved pulling federal funding from the school."

=== Allegations of antisemitism ===
Multiple sources have quoted some Jewish students saying they felt unsafe or targeted as a result of the protests.

Criticism increased when a January 2024 recording of one organizer, Khymani James, saying "Zionists don't deserve to live" was released. James apologized when the remarks were publicized in April 2024. He wrote on X: "I affirm the sanctity of all life and the movement for liberation." In April, he was barred from campus and suspended. In October, he retracted his apology.

One Jewish student who wore a Star of David chain said she was confronted by a masked pro-Palestinian demonstrator on campus, who asked whether she was a Zionist. U.S. Representative Kathy Manning said she saw signs at Columbia calling for the destruction of Israel. Freshman student Nicholas Baum described hearing protesters "calling for Hamas to blow away Tel Aviv and Israel". Another protester was recorded holding a sign reading "Al-Qassam's next targets" in front of student counterprotesters holding Israeli flags.

On April 20, protesters both on and off campus were recorded targeting Jewish students with antisemitic vitriol, resulting in condemnation by both the White House and the New York Mayor's office. A chapter of the international Orthodox Jewish movement present at the campus hired guards to escort Jewish students home from Chabad. According to The Times Of Israel, protesters at the encampment were filmed chanting "Zionists not allowed here" and another protester called for "10,000 October 7ths". One Jewish student reported protesters saying "kill all the Jews" and "we want one Arab state", calling the campus a "hotbed for radical antisemitism". Protesters from outside the campus were filmed yelling "Go back to Poland". CUAD organizers put out a statement distancing themselves from "inflammatory individuals who do not represent us". CUAD's rhetoric later changed; in October, it distributed literature praising the October 7 attacks and saying, "The Palestinian resistance is moving their struggle to a new phase of escalation and it is our duty to meet them there."

Pro-Palestinian Jewish protesters have rejected assertions that the protest is antisemitic or unsafe for Jewish students, and the Columbia Daily Spectator reported that pro-Israeli counter-protesters have called pro-Palestinian Jewish protesters "fake Jews" or "kapos". Many Jewish students, while denouncing antisemitism, felt solidarity with pro-Palestinian protesters. A senior committee of the university's Faculty of Arts and Sciences and an op-ed by Iranian-American writer Aubtin Heydari argued that national media pushed a skewed narrative by characterizing the protest as antisemitic and hateful. Some protesters said that agitators and non-students were responsible for antisemitic incidents.

In comments published by Al Jazeera on April 25, 2024, Columbia professor Susan Bernofsky said: "I do not feel that this project is antisemitic in any way. I do feel that the students are highly critical of Israeli politics. And I do not feel threatened as a Jewish faculty member in any way by what's happening on this campus—except by the arrest of many of our students." Of protesters, Columbia professor John McWhorter said, "I find it very hard to imagine that they are antisemitic", adding that there is "a fine line between questioning Israel's right to exist and questioning Jewish people's right to exist" but that "some of the rhetoric amid the protests crosses it."

=== Allegations of anti-Palestinian harassment ===
Palestine Legal's lawsuit against Columbia University alleges that Columbia held pro-Palestinian students to a different standard "through its policies, statements and other administrative actions". The lawsuit says that Columbia did not respond to the doxxing of pro-Palestinian students in October 2023, that it mishandled an incident where two pro-Israel students sprayed pro-Palestinian students with skunk spray in January 2024, and that it delayed an investigation into the conduct of professor Shai Davidai, who had over 50 harassment complaints against him. On October 16, Columbia barred Davidai from entering campus, citing his harassment and intimidation of school employees.

=== Allegation of "outside agitators" ===
The term "outside agitators" was widely used by public figures and media coverage during the Columbia protests. The term was used to dismiss student protests by claiming that they had been coopted by foreign actors rather than acting organically. After clearing out the 2024 Gaza Solidarity Encampment and Hind's Hall occupation of Hamilton Hall at Columbia University, New York City Police Department deputy commissioner Tarik Sheppard claimed that the chains of bike locks sold by Columbia University were "not what students bring to school" to support the claim that outside agitators were responsible for students locking themselves in Hamilton Hall. New York City Mayor Eric Adams also emphasized the role of outside agitators in the protests. The chaplain of the Columbia Catholic student center, Roger J. Landry, echoed these allegations. At the California Gaza war protests, "outside agitator" allegations were also made.

Eric Adams cited the presence of Nahla Al-Arian at the Columbia encampment as a justification for the NYPD's raid, calling her an "outside agitator" trying to "radicalize our children" and implying that she posed a threat because of her husband Sami Al-Arian's prosecution on terror charges during the early years of the war on terror.

== See also ==
- Academic and legal responses to the Gaza genocide
- 2024 University of California, Los Angeles pro-Palestinian campus occupation
- Boycott, Divestment and Sanctions
- International reactions to the Gaza war
- Student protest
- Detention of Mahmoud Khalil
- Detention of Mohsen Mahdawi
- The Encampments (documentary film)
