= Columbia University Apartheid Divest =

Coalition of student groups at Columbia University

- CUAD logo featuring the Alma Mater statue

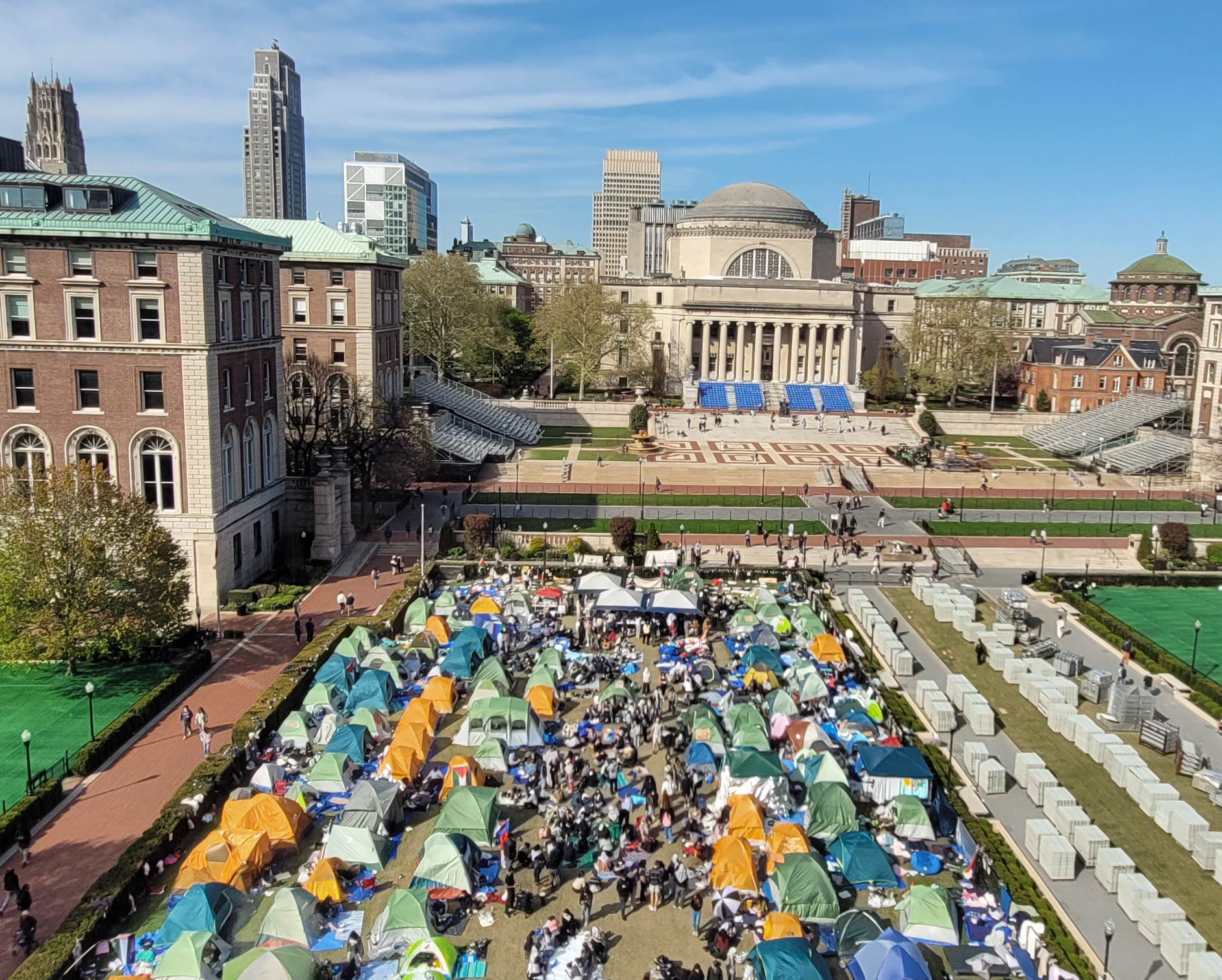
- Gaza Solidarity Encampment on Columbia's campus, April 2024
- Abbreviation: CUAD
- Founded: November 14, 2023
- Founded at: Columbia University
- Type: Protest group, student group
- Location: United States
- Members: 100+ student organizations
- Publication: The Barricade
- Secessions: Columbia Palestine Solidarity Coalition
- Affiliations: Boycott, Divestment and Sanctions
- Website: cuapartheiddivest.substack.com

Columbia University Apartheid Divest (CUAD) was a coalition of student groups at Columbia University involved in protests calling for the university to divest from Israel during the war and genocide in Gaza. Forming as an ad-hoc coalition of over 80 student groups following the irregular suspension of the university's chapters of Students for Justice in Palestine (SJP) and Jewish Voice for Peace (JVP), the coalition was announced at a rally at the Columbia University sundial on November 14, 2023. It gained international recognition with the establishment of the Gaza Solidarity Encampment (April 17–30, 2024), which led to the proliferation of Palestine solidarity encampments at over 180 universities around the world.

In October 2024, the New York Times described CUAD as having become "more hard-line in its rhetoric, openly supporting militant groups fighting Israel". On October 19, Columbia Palestine Solidarity Coalition (CPSC) announced itself in the Columbia Daily Spectator as distinct from CUAD, which it described as having "shifted from a horizontally structured coalition founded on Palestinian liberation to a nebulous organization that is not led by the affinity group of Palestinian student organizers."

A previous iteration of CUAD was founded in 2016 by the university's chapters of JVP and SJP as a Boycott, Divestment and Sanctions (BDS)-affiliated protest group. It became inactive in 2020.

== History ==
=== Outbreak of the war and genocide in Gaza ===
Following the outbreak of the war in Gaza, the Columbia chapters of Students for Justice in Palestine (SJP) and Jewish Voice for Peace (JVP) published an open letter on October 9, 2023, expressing "full solidarity with Palestinian resistance against over 75 years of Israeli settler-colonialism and apartheid" and calling for a protest at 4:30 p.m. on October 12.

SJP and JVP started working with other student groups, including the Palestinian student union (known as Dar-Jafra or Dar), the Palestine Working Group (PWG) from the School of International and Public Affairs, and Columbia Law Students for Palestine (CLSP) from the Law School. These and two dozen other student groups signed a joint statement from Palestine Solidarity Groups at Columbia calling on the university to "end its ties with" what it described as "apartheid Israel".

=== Suspension of Students for Justice in Palestine and Jewish Voice for Peace ===
On October 25, 2023, Jonathan Greenblatt of the Anti-Defamation League (ADL) and Alyza D. Lewin and Kenneth L. Marcus of the Brandeis Center wrote university presidents a letter calling on them to investigate SJP for "potential violations of the prohibition against materially supporting a foreign terrorist organization", without providing any evidence in support of this allegation. Additionally, the letter stated that "universities must also update their code of conduct to ensure that harassment and support for terrorism have no place on campus".

On November 10, 2023, Columbia senior administrator Gerald Rosberg announced the suspension of the university's chapters of Students for Justice in Palestine (SJP) and Jewish Voice for Peace (JVP), citing a violation of university rules after the November 9 protest, which he described as an "unauthorized event" that included "threatening rhetoric and intimidation". The suspension came after senior administrators quietly revised policies cited in the suspension on October 24, adding a new section to the University Event Policy webpage that declared the administration's right to "regulate the time, place and manner of certain forms of public expression" without input from the University Senate. Hundreds of students and faculty members protested the suspension and signed open letters in condemnation.

According to Drop Site News, the claim that SJP and JVP used "threatening rhetoric and intimidation" was debunked by journalists and retracted by Rosberg privately in a University Senate Plenary on November 17, 2023, but Columbia did not reverse the suspension of SJP and JVP and never issued a public statement to correct and clarify the matter. The suspension heightened conflicts between faculty and administration.

=== Coalition ===
In response to the suspension of JVP and SJP from Columbia University four days before, students gathered for a rally at the sundial on November 14, 2023, where the formation was announced of a new coalition of several student organizations called Columbia University Apartheid Divest demanding that Columbia "disclose financial investments and sever all ties with the apartheid regime of Israel." The rally featured speeches from representatives of the Palestinian, Black, anti-Zionist Jewish, Latine, Queer, and Indigenous student organizations that joined the coalition, and the crowd stretched from the sundial to Butler Library.

Within a day, CUAD had 38 signatories. By November 29, there were 80 student organizations that had joined CUAD. Among the over 120 student groups that eventually joined CUAD were groups such as the Anthropology Graduate Student Association, and the Caribbean Students Association, as well as campus chapters of Amnesty International, Jewish Voice for Peace, Students for Justice in Palestine, and Young Democratic Socialists of America.

A previous iteration of Columbia University Apartheid Divest was founded in 2016 by students in the university's chapters of JVP and SJP as a BDS-affiliated protest group calling on the university to divest from Israel. Its creation in 2016 was inspired by the Black Lives Matter movement. It became inactive in 2020 after a Columbia College Student Council referendum to divest from Israel passed, but did not affect the university's investments.

CUAD's demands included unsuspension of JWP and SJP, ceasefire in the Gaza War, Columbia University stopping dual degree program with Tel Aviv University, change of the university's events policies and protection of academic freedom. In October 2024, several organizations left CUAD to form the Columbia Palestine Solidarity Coalition, with one of them stating that CUAD had become a "nebulous organization that is not led by the affinity group of Palestinian student organizers". In April 2025, Students for a Democratic Society said that Instagram account of CUAD was banned without reason or prior warnings.

In April 2024, a video that had been filmed by CUAD member Khymani James that January resurfaced on social media. The video showed James saying "Zionists, they don't deserve to live comfortably, let alone, Zionists don't deserve to live" and “Be grateful that I’m not just going out and murdering Zionists”. The university responded by banning James from campus. He later apologized, saying that his comments were "wrong" and "not in line with the CUAD community guidelines". In an Instagram post, CUAD said that his comments did "not reflect his views".

==== Announcement of Columbia Palestine Solidarity Coalition as distinct from CUAD ====
October 19, 2024, the Columbia Palestine Solidarity Coalition (CPSC) announced itself as a "collective of Palestinian student organizers who wish to reclaim the pro-Palestinian student movement and recenter Palestine at Columbia University" in the Columbia Daily Spectator. It distinguished itself from CUAD, which it described as having "shifted from a horizontally structured coalition founded on Palestinian liberation to a nebulous organization that is not led by the affinity group of Palestinian student organizers."

President of Columbia University Claire Shipman announced in July 2025 email announcing various changes it described as measures to combat antisemitism, as Columbia was finalizing its $200 million settlement with the Trump administration, "has not, and will not, recognize or meet with the group that calls itself ‘Columbia University Apartheid Divest’ (CUAD), its representatives, or any of its affiliated organizations." The university sent cease and desist letters to social media accounts of CUAD for using the name of the university without permission. As a result, CUAD's X account changed its name to "CU Apartheid Divest" and said in its bio that it was "proudly unrecognized" by the university.

In March 2026, following the assassination of Supreme Leader of Iran Ali Khamenei, X account of CUAD posted the Persian phrase Marg bar Âmrikâ (مرگ بر آمریکا), meaning "death to America". The post resulted in backlash against CUAD and Columbia University. 50th speaker of the House of Representatives Newt Gingrich called for CUAD to be disbanded and its members deported from the United States. Senator Ted Cruz and representative Elise Stefanik condemned the post. In response, Columbia University issued a statement condemning CUAD, stating that it is not a recognized student organization and is not affiliated with the university. It also stated that there is no evidence that account of CUAD is operated by a member of the university.

== Political views ==
The statement announcing CUAD's formation listed six demands in addition to economic divestment and academic boycott: that Columbia call on government officials to demand an immediate ceasefire; divest from companies benefiting from Israeli apartheid; cancel the opening of the Tel Aviv Global Center; cease the dual-degree program with Tel Aviv University; protect academic freedom and stop vilifying pro-Palestinian activism; and reinstate SJP and JVP.

CUAD situated itself within the tradition of student activism at Columbia, including protests in 1936 led by Robert Burke against affiliations between the institution and its former president Nicholas Murray Butler with Nazi Germany, student protests in 1968 against the university's involvement in the Vietnam War and racial segregation, and student protests against South African apartheid. In its foundational statement, the coalition announced:

CUAD, or Columbia University Apartheid Divest, is a coalition of student organizations that sees Palestine as the vanguard for our collective liberation. We are a continuation of the Vietnam anti-war movement and the movement to divest from apartheid South Africa. We support freedom and justice for the Palestinian people, and for all people.

In a 2023 Columbia Daily Spectator op-ed, CUAD described itself as a coalition of student groups who see Palestine as a "vanguard" for "collective liberation" whose goal is to persuade Columbia University to divest from Israel in order to achieve a "liberated Palestine and the end of Israeli apartheid". CUAD said that its a feminist, anti-capitalist and pro-decolonization organization which supports Land Back in the "Turtle Island" and Palestinian right of return.

=== October 2024 political and ideological shift ===
In October 2024, The New York Times reported that CUAD had become more radicalized and had begun openly supporting Palestinian militant groups fighting against Israel. On the anniversary of the October 7 Attacks, CUAD called the attack a “moral, military and political victory”. In 2026, Robby Soave in Reason said that after Israel's killing of Hamas leader Yahya Sinwar, the official Substack blog of CUAD described him as a "hero of the revolution" and called on the people to "reflect" on how to become "more like him". Haaretz and The Times of Israel reported that CUAD supported the 2024 Jaffa shooting in Israel that killed seven people, calling it a "bold act" and a "significant act of resistance".

On October 8, 2024, CUAD rescinded its apology for statements made by Khymani James, saying that it supports "liberation by any means necessary, including armed resistance" and that it let James down.

Also in October, The Barricade, the CUAD blog on Substack, said that it supports armed resistance by Hamas and other militants groups in Palestine. Citing intellectuals such as Vladimir Lenin and Frantz Fanon, CUAD said that it also supports the Axis of Resistance for what it calls its opposition to imperialism, according to The New York Times. According to The Jerusalem Post, CUAD regularly quoted PFLP founder George Habash and Hezbollah leader Hassan Nasrallah in its documents, and showed the works of PFLP spokesman Ghassan Kanafani at events. Various media outlets noted that in an Instagram post supporting the July Uprising, CUAD said that its goal is “total eradication” of Western civilization.

== Activities ==
=== Referendums (2017–2020) ===
In April 2017, a resolution by CUAD proposing to hold a referendum asking whether the university support the Boycott, Divestment, and Sanctions movement was rejected by the Columbia College Student Council. Critics of the proposed referendum argued that its wording accusing Israel of practicing apartheid could have led to divisions among students. In April 2018, at Barnard College a CUAD-proposed referendum to divest from eight companies "that profit from or engage in the State of Israel’s treatment of Palestinians" was approved by 64% of the vote, with 1,153 students (almost half the Barnard student body, according to Socialist Worker but 30% according to Barnard's leadership) participating.

In March 2019, a divestment referendum proposed by CUAD was rejected 20–17 by Columbia College Student Council. In November 2019, the council voted 25–12 to hold a CUAD-proposed divestment referendum in 2020. The referendum called for the university to cut ties with companies that they accused of profiting from the Israeli apartheid. The referendum was held in September 2020. 1,771 students participated in the referendum (39.3% of the Columbia College student body), of whom 1081 voted in favor, 485 voted against, and 205 abstained. President of the university Lee Bollinger objected to the referendum, saying that the university should not change its investment policies as there is "no consensus across the University community". He said that only Advisory Committee on Socially Responsible Investing can make such decision.

=== Protests (2023–2025) ===
In December 2023, CUAD staged two protests near Low Memorial Library, chanting slogans such as “We will free Palestine within our lifetimes” and “Free Palestine”. On January 23, 2024, CUAD said in a Mondoweiss op-ed that it held an "emergency protest" near Low Memorial Library to protest US–UK airstrikes on Yemen, during which counter-protesters sprayed them with Skunk spray.

==== Gaza Solidarity Encampment ====
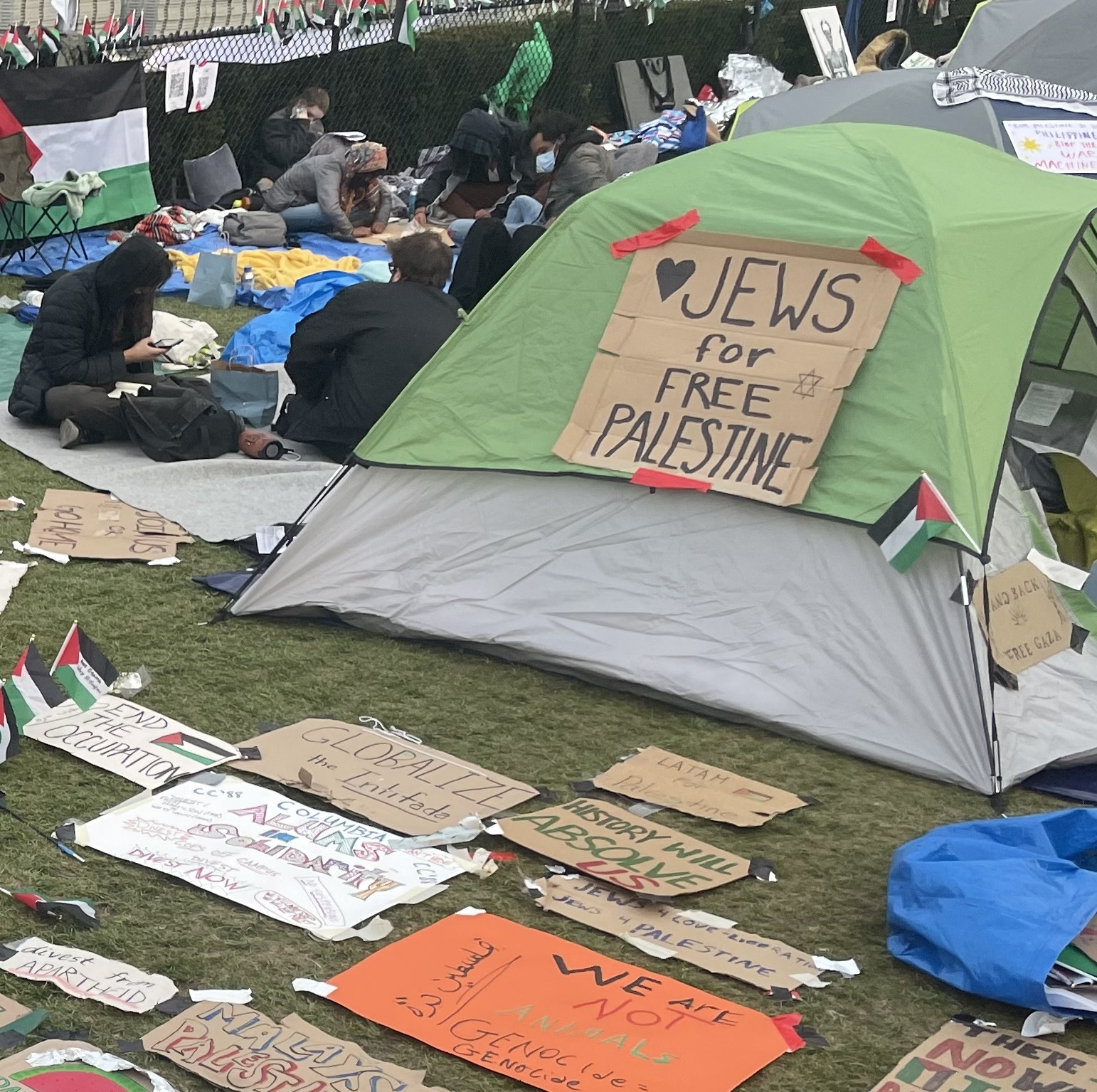
"Jews for free Palestine" sign on a tent at the Gaza Solidarity Encampment.

In April 2024, CUAD organized the Gaza Solidarity Encampament, a protest planned for several months. During the protest, hundreds of students set up tents near Columbia University to protest its financial support for Israel. Several Barnard College students who participated in the protest were suspended in response, including Isra Hirsi, CUAD organizer and daughter of congresswoman Ilhan Omar. CUAD alleged that the students experienced police brutality during the protests.

On August 26, 2024, CUAD together with Students for Justice in Palestine held a pro-Palestine protest at Columbia University's ceremony welcoming new students. That month, Columbia University launched disciplinary proceedings against 60 students for violating campus rules at protests organized by CUAD, including negotiator of CUAD Mahmoud Khalil. On October 8, 2024, at the anniversary of October 7 attacks, CUAD organized a walkout at Columbia University attended by hundreds of students. Speakers of the demonstration described October 7 as a “monumental step in the populist delegitimization of the state of Israel”. Members of the demonstration distributed copies of the protest publication The New York War Crimes, the headline of which read: “One Year Since Al-Aqsa Flood, Revolution Until Victory”. Pro-Israel student group Students Supporting Israel organized a counter-protest in response and accused CUAD of supporting Hamas.

In December 2024, CUAD held a rally outside of Barnard College alongside with activist group Within Our Lifetime and pro-Palestine Haredi Jewish protesters: over a hundred people attended. CUAD said that the rally was held to hold the trustees of Columbia University and Barnard University "accountable for the genocide of Palestinians”.

On January 21, 2025, CUAD organized a protest at "History of Modern Israel" course taught by Israeli historian Avi Shilon in Columbia University, and called for the disruption of other Israeli classes. On February 24, 2025, two Barnard College students who participated in the protest were expelled. CUAD described the expulsions as "serious escalation in the crackdown against students advocating for disinvestment from the Israeli war machine".

On January 29, 2025, CUAD co-hosted a rally and a teach-in at Columbia University about solidarity between Black people and Palestinians. On January 30, CUAD posted a video on social media showing a row of clogged toilets and several people spraying red paint on walls. The video said that CUAD attacked "two targets at Columbia University". CUAD claimed that it filled the university's sewage systems with cement, disrupting its operations. In February 2025, CUAD held a rally against the Gaza War near Columbia University before joining a protest held by Palestinian Youth Movement.

==== "Basel Al-Araj Popular University" occupation of Butler Library ====
Pro-Palestinian protesters entered and took over Room 301, the main reading room at Butler Library, at around 3:15 pm, naming it the "Basel Al-Araj Popular University" for Bassel al-Araj. Columbia Public Safety security guards blocked the reading room exit and required the protesters to show their university identification or face arrest for trespassing, creating a standoff. At 6:55 pm, acting president Claire Shipman summoned the NYPD to remove the protesters, of whom police in riot gear arrested 78—the fourth mass arrest at Columbia University in 18 months and the largest since April 2024, when the NYPD arrested 109 in its sweep of the "Hind's Hall" occupation of Hamilton Hall and the second Gaza Solidarity Encampment. The policing and suppression of the protest has been described as forceful, violent, and aggressive, with two people brought out in stretchers, one of them wearing a kuffiyeh draped over their face. Shipman praised the NYPD and Public Safety for what she called their "professionalism".

=== Other events ===
==== Resistance 101 event ====
On March 24, 2024, students held a "Resistance 101" panel featuring speakers from Within Our Lifetime, Masar Badil, and Samidoun Palestinian Prisoners Network, as well as Khaled Barakat, allegedly a member of the Popular Front for the Liberation of Palestine, though Barakat denied that. Columbia hired the private law firm Debevoise & Plimpton to investigate the event.

== Reception ==
In November 2017, an online group sent messages to emails of dozens of Columbia University professors that called them to condemn student Jeff Jacobs for being a founding member of CUAD. The messages accused him of being a Stalinist and supporting Hamas.

The Jerusalem Post characterized CUAD is coalition of far-left and anti-Israel student groups.

In October 2024, senator Joni Ernst and congresswoman Elise Stefanik wrote a letter to FBI Assistant Director Charge James calling for CUAD to be investigated. They accused CUAD of threatening violence against Jewish students at Columbia University and said it should be considered a "medium threat". In March 2025, CUAD along with other activist groups, were sued by nine American and Israeli citizens who were victims of October 7 attacks. The lawsuit accused CUAD and other groups of coordinating with Hamas.

In May 2025, leaders of CUAD rejected accusations of it being antisemitic, saying the coalition includes multiple Jewish student groups.

=== Federal investigation ===
In February 2025, Emil Bove III, whom Donald Trump appointed as principal associate deputy attorney general after Bove had served on Trump's personal legal team, ordered the Department of Justice to investigate CUAD. Bove told prosecutors to find a list of CUAD members so he could forward their names to Immigration and Customs Enforcement. The move raised "anger and alarm among career prosecutors and investigators who saw the demand as politically motivated and lacking legal merit," according to The New York Times, with Department of Justice investigators questioning the existence of the list and arguing that some of Bove's orders could possibly violate First Amendment. Mahmoud Khalil's legal team, citing Bove's having "directed immigration enforcement investigations and decisions against student protesters on college campuses—particularly at Columbia University, where Mr. Khalil was enrolled," requested that Bove recuse himself from legal case related to the Trump administration's attempts to deport Khalil.

The Intercept reported that, between March and April 2025, the FBI and the Department of Justice attempted unsuccessfully to procure a search warrant for CUAD's Instagram account. The requests were denied by Manhattan magistrate judge three times. The warrant would have allowed the government to identify the account's owners and all users who interacted with it since January 2024. In its attempt to secure a search warrant for CUAD's Instagram account, the government cited an Instagram post by CUAD on March 14, 2024 of anonymously submitted images of red paint and graffiti on the university's President's House with a caption on the post that said: "Katrina Armstrong you will not be allowed peace as you sic NYPD officers and ICE agents on your own students for opposing the genocide of the Palestinian people." The government argued that the post represented a "true threat" outside First Amendment protections to Katrina Armstrong, then interim president of the university, and therefore violated federal law.
