= Columbia University's settlement with the Trump administration =

July 2025 event in the United States

On July 23, 2025, the board of trustees of Columbia University formalized a settlement with the Trump administration in which Columbia would pay the federal government US$221 million and accept various demands from the Trump administration, including adopting the IHRA definition of antisemitism; punishing student demonstrators with expulsions, degree revocations, and multi-year suspensions; and reviewing the university's Middle East studies programs. Following the Gaza Solidarity Encampment and broader protests amid the Gaza genocide, the university became a focus of Donald Trump, whose administration, citing what it called widespread antisemitism at Columbia, cut $400 million in funding to the university, detained and attempted to deport Palestinian student-activists Mahmoud Khalil and Mohsen Mahdawi, and investigated Columbia for Title VI violations. Critics of the settlement have called the government's actions "extortion" and Columbia's actions "capitulation."

Trump announced the $400 million cut in federal funding to Columbia on March 7, 2025, the day before plainclothes federal ICE agents apprehended Mahmoud Khalil from his Columbia residence building. On March 14, the Trump administration sent Columbia a list of demands it considered "preconditions for formal negotiations" with regard to federal funding, to which Columbia's administration agreed. Co-chair of the board of trustees, David Greenwald, announced that interim president Katrina Armstrong would step down and that the other co-chair of the trustees, Claire Shipman, would serve as acting president of the university. On April 18, Shipman announced that the University Senate—a shared governance legislative body including students and faculty members—would be subject to review. The Senate oversaw the University Judicial Board, which, until the summer of 2025, had been responsible for university disciplinary cases, and which the Trump administration demanded be abolished in the second item of its March 2025 list of demands.

In the negotiations, Trump's team was led by Stephen Miller and Columbia was represented by Jay Lefkowitz and Matt Owen of the law firm Kirkland & Ellis. The final 22-page document, officially the "Resolution Agreement Between the United States of America and Columbia University", was signed July 23, 2025 by US attorney general Pam Bondi for the Department of Justice, Linda McMahon for the Department of Education, Robert F. Kennedy Jr. for the Department of Health and Human Services, and one of the trustees of Columbia. The settlement also provided for Columbia to pay for a claims fund worth $21 million for Jewish employees at the university reporting that they experienced antisemitism at the university, for which the Equal Employment Opportunity Commission (EEOC) would determine eligibility.

== Background ==
The Gaza Solidarity Encampment (17–April 30, 2024) was a protest encampment at Columbia University in New York City held in solidarity with the Palestinians of Gaza amid the Gaza genocide, demanding that the university divest from Israel. Six months into the Gaza war and after months of student protest and repression from the university's administration and trustees, the occupation of the lawns in front of Butler Library was a tactical escalation at the university. The encampment was associated with Columbia University Apartheid Divest (CUAD), a coalition of over 100 student groups that formed after the administration irregularly suspended the Columbia chapters of Students for Justice in Palestine and Jewish Voice for Peace in the fall of 2023. The Gaza Solidarity Encampment at Columbia was prominent among the Gaza war protests on university campuses and in the US, and it led to the proliferation of Palestine solidarity encampments at over 180 universities around the world.

== Timeline ==
=== March 7, 2025: Trump administration cuts $400 million in funding to Columbia ===
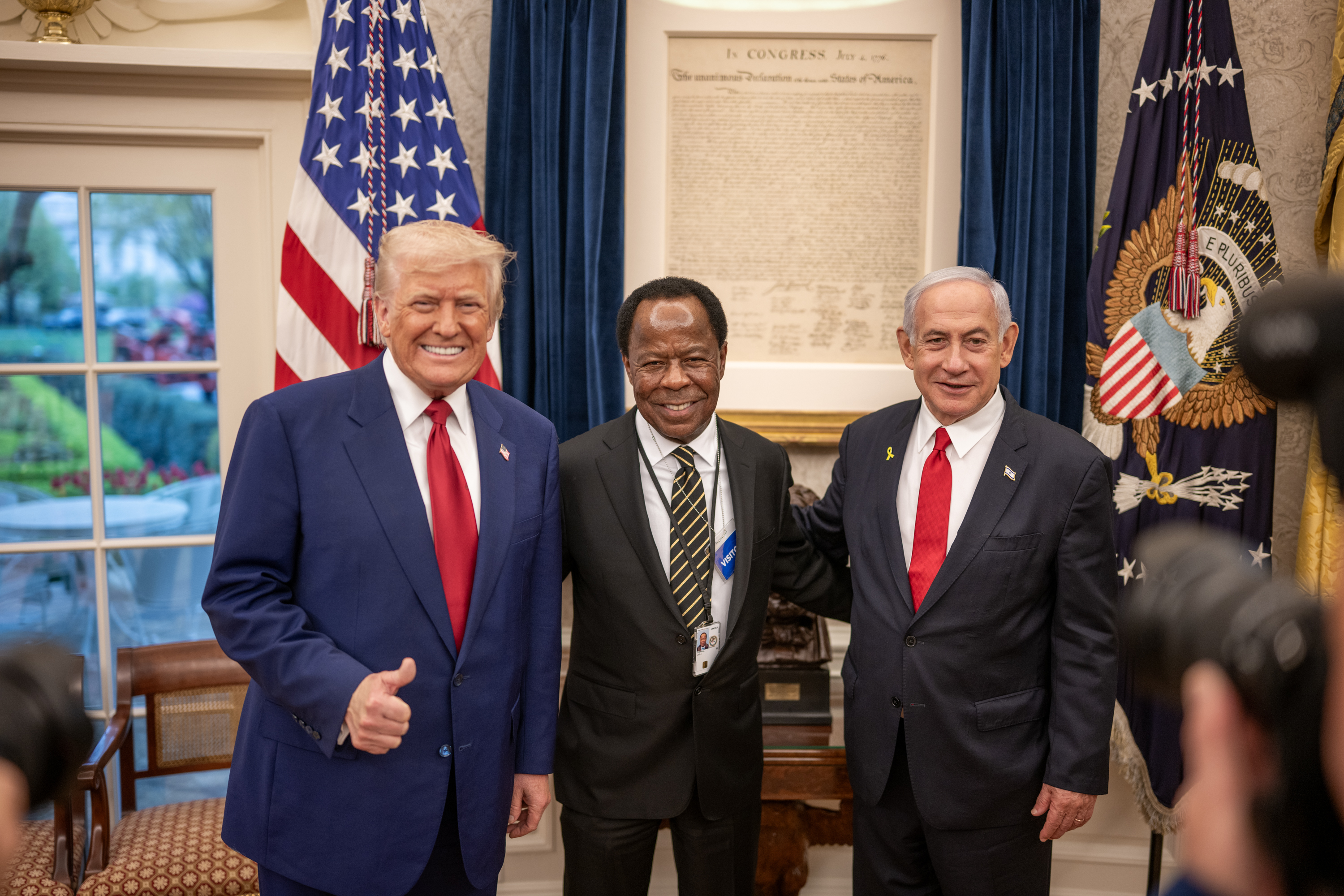
Leo Terrell, the head of the Trump administration's Task Force to Combat Antisemitism, with President Donald Trump and Israeli prime minister Benjamin Netanyahu on April 7, 2025

Days after the Federal Task Force to Combat Antisemitism announced it was considering stop-work orders on $51.4 million in federal contracts with the university, the Trump administration announced a $400 million cut. Trump had publicly criticized Columbia 25 years earlier when it refused to purchase a property in Midtown from him for $400 million. According to The Atlantic, "with Trump's buy-in, [Stephen] Miller was ultimately the one who approved pulling federal funding from the school."

=== March 8, 2025: Detention of Mahmoud Khalil by ICE and threats by the Trump administration ===
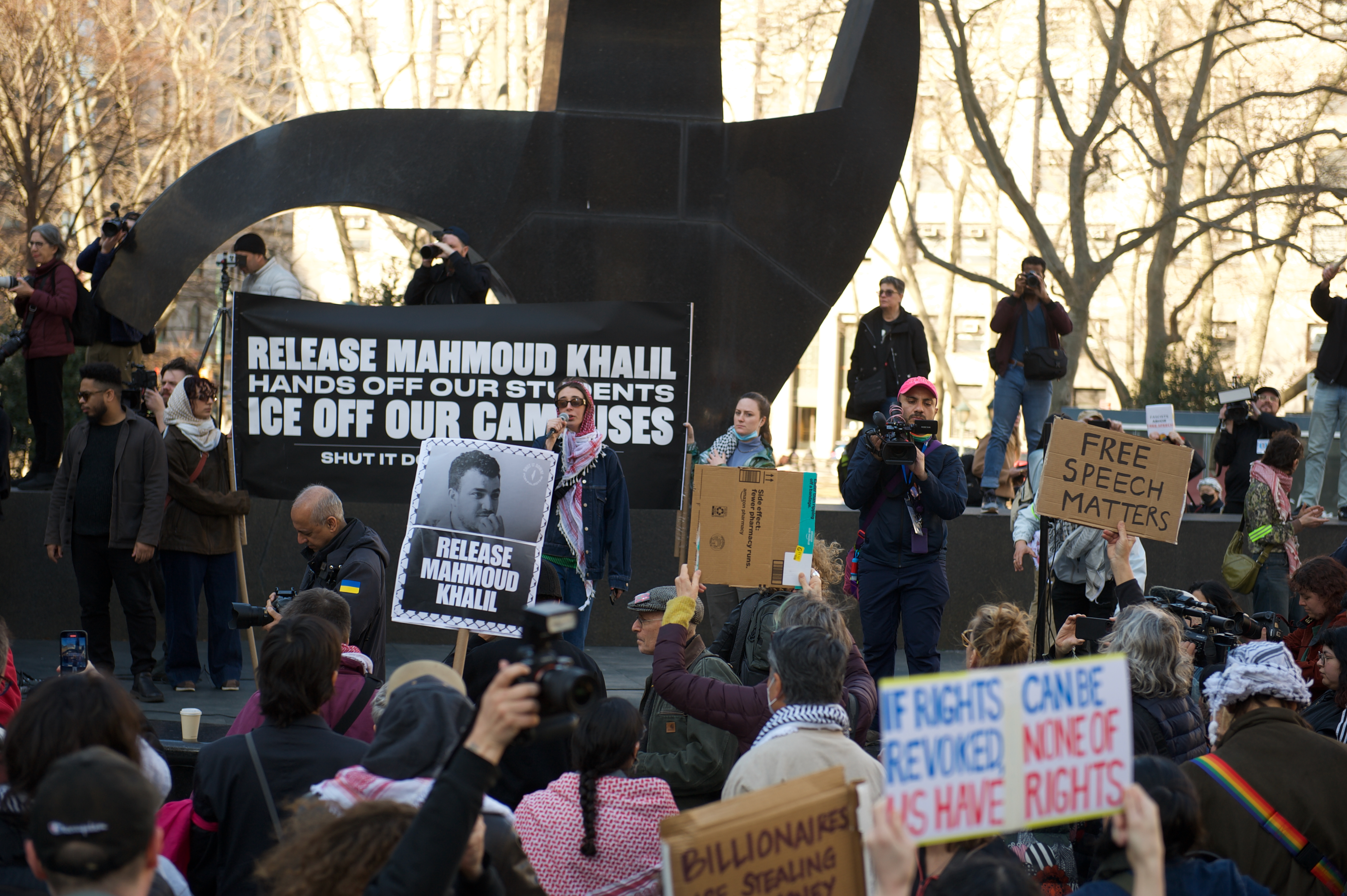
Protest against the detention of Mahmoud Khalil, New York City on March 10, 2025

Repression of pro-Palestinian protesters intensified in 2025 during the second presidency of Donald Trump, when the Trump administration announced the revocation of $400 million in federal funding for the school despite renewed efforts by Columbia to crack down on student protests through a new disciplinary committee. These efforts included the expulsion of students previously involved with pro-Palestine protests, and the temporary suspension and/or revocation of degrees for students who had already graduated. On March 9, Immigration and Customs Enforcement detained SIPA alumnus Mahmoud Khalil, a leading pro-Palestinian negotiator and lawful permanent resident, following an online campaign by pro-Israel groups to have him deported. Mohsen Mahdawi, a second Palestinian member of the Columbia University community, was arrested for deportation soon after.

=== March 13, 2025: Expulsions, degree revocations, and suspensions for Gaza Solidarity Encampment and Hind's Hall student protesters ===
The Columbia University Judicial Board (UJB) issued a statement announcing expulsions, multiple-year suspensions, and degree revocations for students involved in the Gaza Solidarity Encampment and Hind's Hall occupation of Hamilton Hall, two days after Rules Administrator Gregory Wawro announced that hearings had been completed. Although these announcements came after the Trump administration demanded this exact kind of punishment, Wawro expressed confidence that the community would "accept the legitimacy of the outcomes, whatever they may be, since we followed our longstanding practices and policies under the Rules."

Most of the cases had been transferred from the Center for Student Success and Intervention (CSSI)—a body established in 2022 providing fewer protections for students and from which the university outsources the disciplinary process to Debevoise & Plimpton, a private law firm—to the UJB, a body established after the 1968 protests and under the University Senate's purview.

Columbia punished 22 students, all of whom were cleared of any criminal charges, with expulsions, multiple-year suspensions, or degree revocations. Among those Columbia expelled was Grant Miner, a PhD student and president of the Student Workers of Columbia—UAW 2710 union, which was due to begin its contract bargaining with Columbia the next day.

=== March 13, 2025: Trump administration issues preconditions for funding negotiations ===
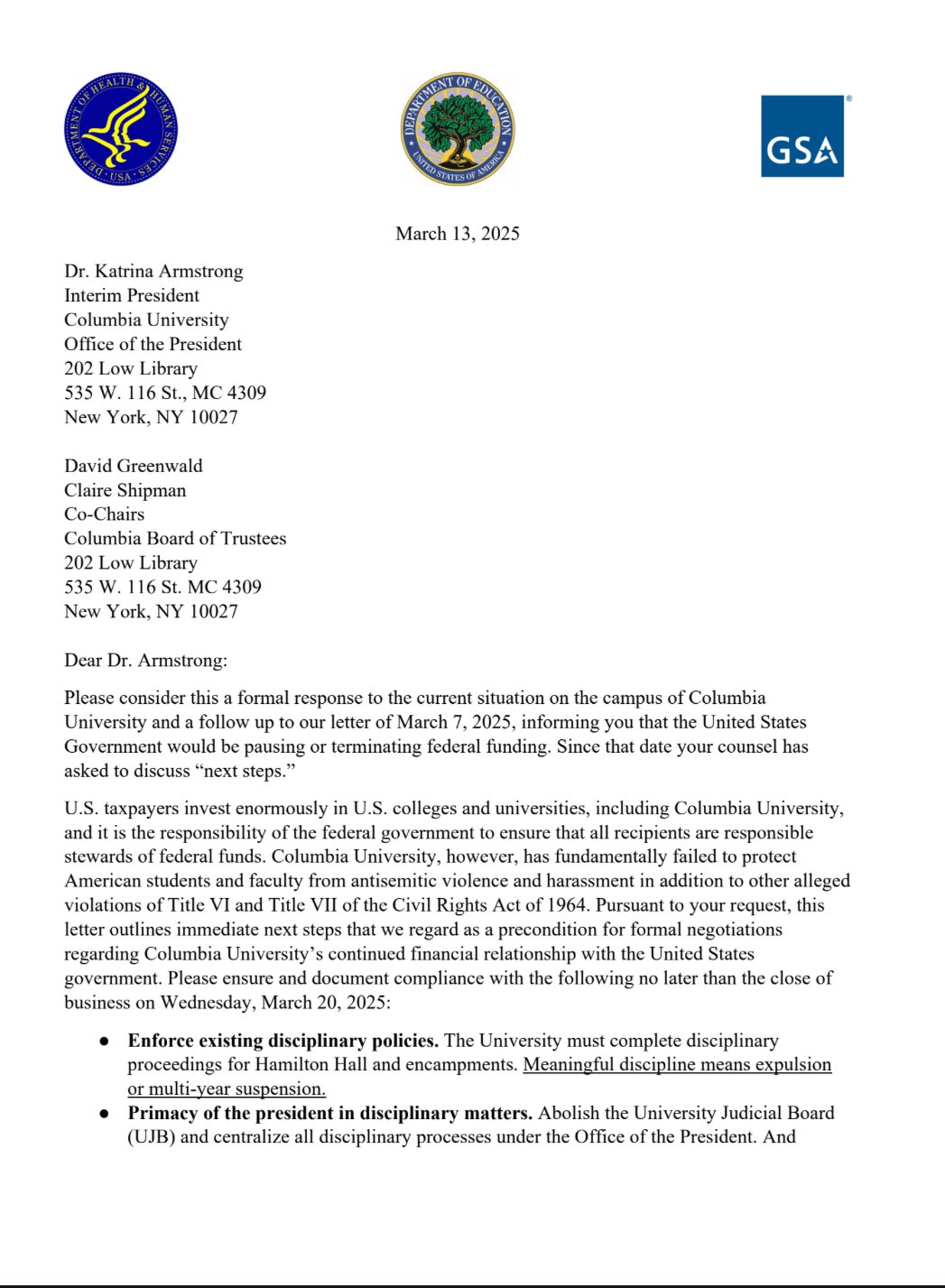
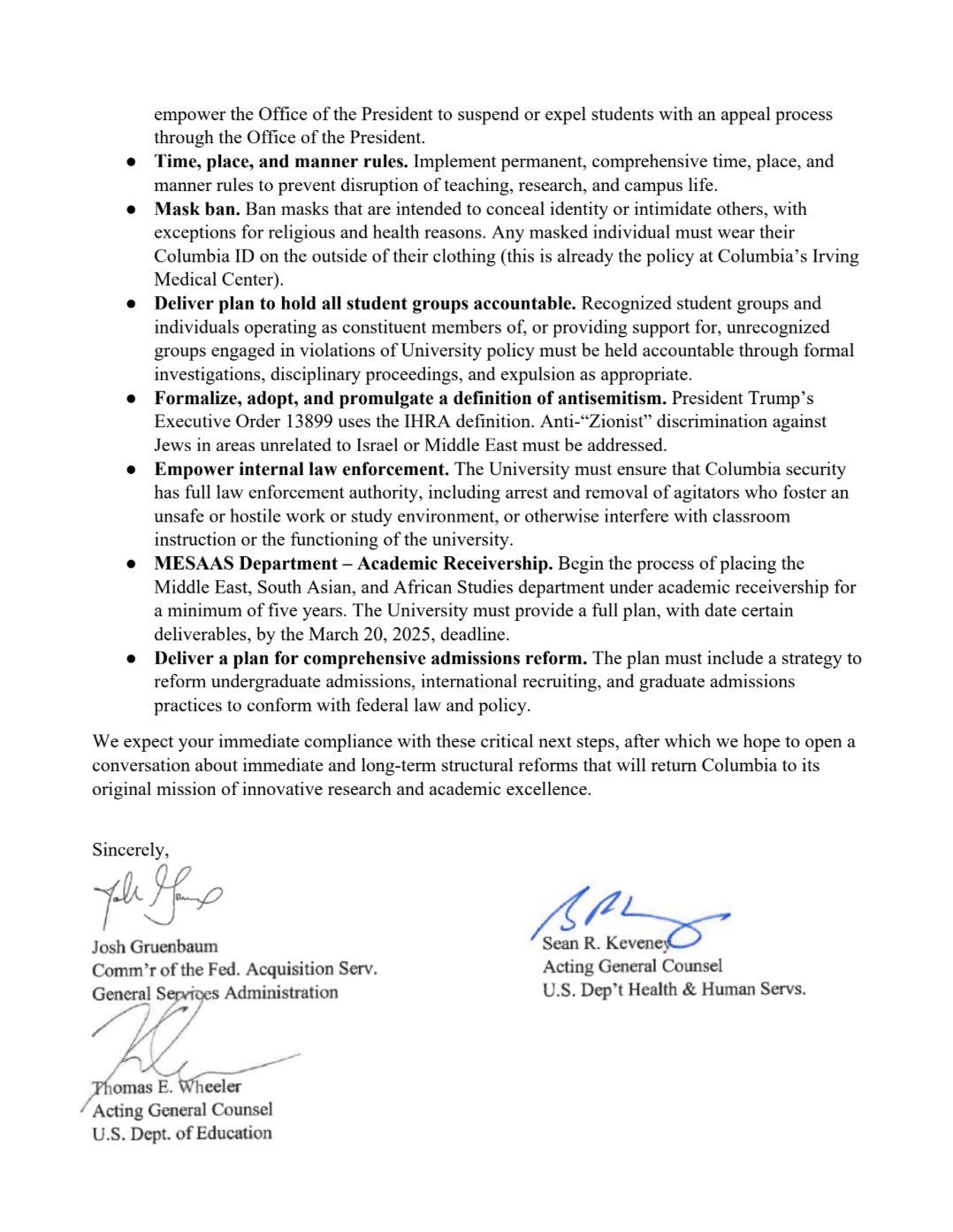
Letter to Columbia University interim president Katrina Armstrong and co-chairs of the board of trustees David Greenwald and Claire Shipman containing the Trump administration's list of demands.

On March 13, Columbia received a letter from the Trump administration listing a number of demands to be met as "a precondition for formal negotiations" for federal funding, after the administration cut $400 million in federal grants and funding. The demands included expulsion or multi-year suspensions as punishment for pro-Palestinian demonstrators; a mask ban; the abolishment of the University Judicial Board in order to "centralize all disciplinary processes" under the university president; placing the Middle East, South Asia, and African Studies (MESAAS) department under academic receivership; adopting a controversial definition of antisemitism; and giving campus police "full law enforcement authority", including to make arrests. Professor Katherine Franke and others called it a "ransom note". Columbia agreed to these demands.

=== March 21, 2025: Columbia's administration acquiesces to Trump's demands ===
On March 21, the university announced several policy measures intended to address the demands. These included restructuring the university's disciplinary system, hiring 36 police officers empowered to make arrests, and appointing a senior vice provost to supervise the Middle Eastern, South Asian, and African Studies (MESAAS) department. According to the announcement, the senior vice provost would conduct "a thorough review of the portfolio of programs in regional areas across the University, starting immediately with the Middle East."

=== March 28, 2025: Armstrong steps down; board of trustees co-chair Claire Shipman made president ===
Although it had recently expressed satisfaction with Armstrong's measures enacted to restore federal funding, a statement from the Trump administration's Joint Task Force to Combat Antisemitism called Armstrong's resignation "an important step toward advancing negotiations" between the government and the university and referred to a "concerning revelation" earlier that week, ostensibly a call with faculty in which she downplayed Columbia's commitment to its concessions to the Trump administration.

Board of trustees co-chair David Greenwald announced that interim president Katrina Armstrong was stepping down and that the other co-chair, Claire Shipman, would serve as acting president of the university. Greenwald became the sole chair of the board of trustees.

=== April 10, 2025: Trump administration considers placing Columbia under federal oversight with consent decree ===
The Wall Street Journal reported that the Trump administration sought to install federal oversight of Columbia University with a consent decree. After Harvard University rejected such demands from the Trump administration, even after it threatened Harvard with over $9 billion in cuts to federal grants and contracts, according to Inside Higher Ed, Columbia appeared to "tacitly reject" the proposal after having already made significant concessions to the Trump administration.

=== April 18, 2025: Shipman announces review of the University Senate shortly after assuming presidency ===
After participating in her first meeting with the University Senate and delivering her first address as acting president on April 4, Claire Shipman, who left her position as co-chair of the board of trustees to become acting president of the university on March 28, announced in an email to the Columbia University community that the University Senate would be subject to review. According to The New York Times, the move was an "effort to potentially diminish the university senate's authority" and one that Shipman and the trustees used "vague language" to explain.

=== May 22, 2025: Trump administration accuses Columbia of violating Jewish students' rights ===
The Department of Health and Human Services accused Columbia of violating Jewish students' rights as proscribed by Title VI of the Civil Rights Act of 1964.

=== June 4, 2025: Department of Education says Columbia does not meet accreditation standards ===
The US Department of Education said Columbia failed to meet accreditation standards due to what it described as a failure to protect Jewish students on campus, a violation of federal anti-discrimination laws.

=== July 15, 2025: Shipman announces Columbia will adopt IHRA definition and partner with the ADL ===
Amid negotiations with the Trump administration over $400 million of federal funding it withdrew from Columbia, acting president Claire Shipman announced that Columbia would adopt the IHRA definition of antisemitism and partner with the Anti-Defamation League (ADL). In the negotiations, Trump's team was led by Stephen Miller and Columbia was represented by Jay Lefkowitz and Matt Owen of the law firm Kirkland & Ellis. Palestinian historian and former Edward Said Professor of Modern Arab Studies Rashid Khalidi cancelled his popular fall 2025 lecture course History of the Modern Middle East citing Columbia's adoption of the IHRA definition, which he says "deliberately, mendaciously and disingenuously conflates Jewishness with Israel, so that any criticism of Israel, or indeed description of Israeli policies, becomes a criticism of Jews."

=== July 22, 2025: UJB punishes over 70 students with expulsions, suspensions, and degree revocations ===
While Columbia was in negotiations with the Trump administration, its University Judicial Board issued expulsions, suspensions, and degree revocations to over 70 students who participated in the "Basel Al-Araj Popular University" occupation of Butler Library.

=== July 23, 2025: Columbia settles with Trump administration and agrees to pay $220 million ===
The day after issuing 70 expulsions, suspensions, and degree revocations to students, Columbia finalized negotiations with the Trump administration and agreed to pay the federal government a $220 million settlement. As part of the deal, Columbia agreed to provide the federal government with the private information of applicants to the university—those admitted as well as those not admitted—including their race, GPA, and standardized test scores. In October, Shipman announced that Jim Glover, an administrator at the Climate School, would assume the role of resolution administrator and vice provost per settlement terms, and would report to Bart Schwartz, a third-party monitor for the settlement. Columbia sent an "initial set of information" including admissions data conveying "both rejected and admitted students broken down by race, color, grade point average, and performance on standardized tests" as well as the university's "training materials to socialize all students". Critics of the settlement have called the government's actions "extortion" and Columbia's actions "capitulation." American Association of University Professors president Todd Wolfson called the settlement "an unprecedented disaster."

As part of the settlement with the Trump administration, Columbia established a claims fund worth $21 million for Jewish employees reporting that they experienced antisemitism at the university. The fund is a settlement of the Title VII investigation of the university from the federal government's Equal Employment Opportunity Commission (EEOC), which will also decide Jewish employees' eligibility for compensation and how much money each will receive. The EEOC started investigating Columbia for antisemitism when its chair, Andrea R. Lucas, filed a formal discrimination complaint against Columbia in June 2024. Some faculty members, including James Schamus, criticized the fund and questioned whether Jewish professors would be given compensation if they supported the Gaza Solidarity Encampment.

=== May 22, 2025: Trump administration accuses Columbia of violating Jewish students' rights ===
The Department of Health and Human Services accused Columbia of violating Jewish students' rights as proscribed by Title VI of the Civil Rights Act of 1964.

=== June 4, 2025: Department of Education says Columbia does not meet accreditation standards ===
The US Department of Education said Columbia failed to meet accreditation standards due to what it described as a failure to protect Jewish students on campus, a violation of federal anti-discrimination laws.

=== July 15, 2025: Shipman announces Columbia will adopt IHRA definition and partner with the ADL ===
Amid negotiations with the Trump administration over $400 million of federal funding it withdrew from Columbia, acting president Claire Shipman announced that Columbia would adopt the IHRA definition of antisemitism and partner with the Anti-Defamation League (ADL). In the negotiations, Trump's team was led by Stephen Miller and Columbia was represented by Jay Lefkowitz and Matt Owen of the law firm Kirkland & Ellis. Professor Rashid Khalidi cited Columbia's adoption of the IHRA definition as the reason he cancelled his fall lecture course History of the Modern Middle East.

=== July 22, 2025: UJB punishes over 70 students with expulsions, suspensions, and degree revocations ===
While Columbia was in negotiations with the Trump administration, its University Judicial Board issued expulsions, suspensions, and degree revocations to over 70 students who participated in the "Basel Al-Araj Popular University" occupation of Butler Library.

=== July 23, 2025: Columbia settles with Trump administration and agrees to pay $220 million ===
The day after issuing 70 expulsions, suspensions, and degree revocations to students, Columbia finalized negotiations with the Trump administration and agreed to pay the federal government a $220 million settlement. As part of the deal, Columbia agreed to provide the federal government with the private information of applicants to the university—those admitted as well as those not admitted—including their race, GPA, and standardized test scores. In October, Shipman announced that Jim Glover, an administrator at the Climate School, would assume the role of resolution administrator and vice provost per settlement terms, and would report to Bart Schwartz, a third-party monitor for the settlement. Columbia sent an "initial set of information" including admissions data conveying "both rejected and admitted students broken down by race, color, grade point average, and performance on standardized tests" as well as the university's "training materials to socialize all students". Critics of the settlement have called the government's actions "extortion" and Columbia's actions "capitulation." American Association of University Professors president Todd Wolfson called the settlement "an unprecedented disaster."

As part of the settlement with the Trump administration, Columbia established a claims fund worth $21 million for Jewish employees reporting that they experienced antisemitism at the university. The fund is a settlement of the Title VII investigation of the university from the federal government's Equal Employment Opportunity Commission (EEOC), which will also decide Jewish employees' eligibility for compensation and how much money each will receive. The EEOC started investigating Columbia for antisemitism when its chair, Andrea R. Lucas, filed a formal discrimination complaint against Columbia in June 2024. Some faculty members, including James Schamus, criticized the fund and questioned whether Jewish professors would be given compensation if they supported the Gaza Solidarity Encampment.

=== February 2026: in wake of Trump demands, provost's Middle East studies review committee issues first report ===
Ten months after Columbia announced it would conduct a "thorough review" of its Middle East studies programs after the Trump administration withdrew US$400 million in federal funding from the university, the provost's regional review committee, led by Miguel Urquiola, issued a report calling for a suite of changes to a number of regional studies programs to be overseen and administered by the university's Committee on Global Thought. Among these changes is a push to expand programs relating to Israel, and it is implicit in the report that new faculty hires will be less critical of Zionism. This comes after Columbia's Task Force on Antisemitism stated in its fourth and final report that "An academic perspective that treats Zionism as legitimate is underrepresented in Columbia’s course offerings, compared to a perspective that treats it as illegitimate." Gil Z. Hochberg, chair of the MESAAS department, stated that she had "not been part of any of these conversations."

== Demands of the Trump administration ==
According to the March 2025 letter to Columbia, the Trump administration demanded:

- Enforce existing disciplinary policies. The university must complete disciplinary proceedings for Hamilton Hall and encampments. Meaningful discipline means expulsion or multi-year suspension.
- Primacy of the president in disciplinary matters. Abolish the University Judicial Board (UJB) and centralize all disciplinary processes under the Office of the President. And empower the Office of the President to suspend or expel students with an appeal process through the Office of the President.
- Time, place, and manner rules. Implement permanent, comprehensive time, place, and manner rules to prevent disruption of teaching, research, and campus life.
- Mask ban. Ban masks that are intended to conceal identity or intimidate others, with exceptions for religious and health reasons. Any masked individual must wear their Columbia ID on the outside of their clothing (this is already the policy at Columbia's Irving Medical Center).
- Deliver plan to hold all student groups accountable. Recognized student groups and individuals operating as constituent members of, or providing support for, unrecognized groups engaged in violations of university policy must be held accountable through formal investigations, disciplinary proceedings, and expulsion as appropriate.
- Formalize, adopt, and promulgate a definition of antisemitism. President Trump's Executive Order 13899 uses the IHRA definition. Anti-"Zionist" discrimination against Jews in areas unrelated to Israel or Middle East must be addressed.
- Empower internal law enforcement. The university must ensure that Columbia security has full law enforcement authority, including arrest and removal of agitators who foster an unsafe or hostile work or study environment, or otherwise interfere with classroom instruction or the functioning of the university.
- MESAAS Department - Academic Receivership. Begin the process of placing the Middle East, South Asian, and African Studies department under academic receivership for a minimum of five years. The university must provide a full plan, with date certain deliverables, by the March 20, 2025, deadline.
- Deliver a plan for comprehensive admissions reform. The plan must include a strategy to reform undergraduate admissions, international recruiting, and graduate admissions practices to conform with federal law and policy.

== See also ==
- Harvard v. Department of Health and Human Services
