= Minouche Shafik =

Egyptian-American economist (born 1962)

The Right Honourable The Baroness Shafik DBE HonFBA
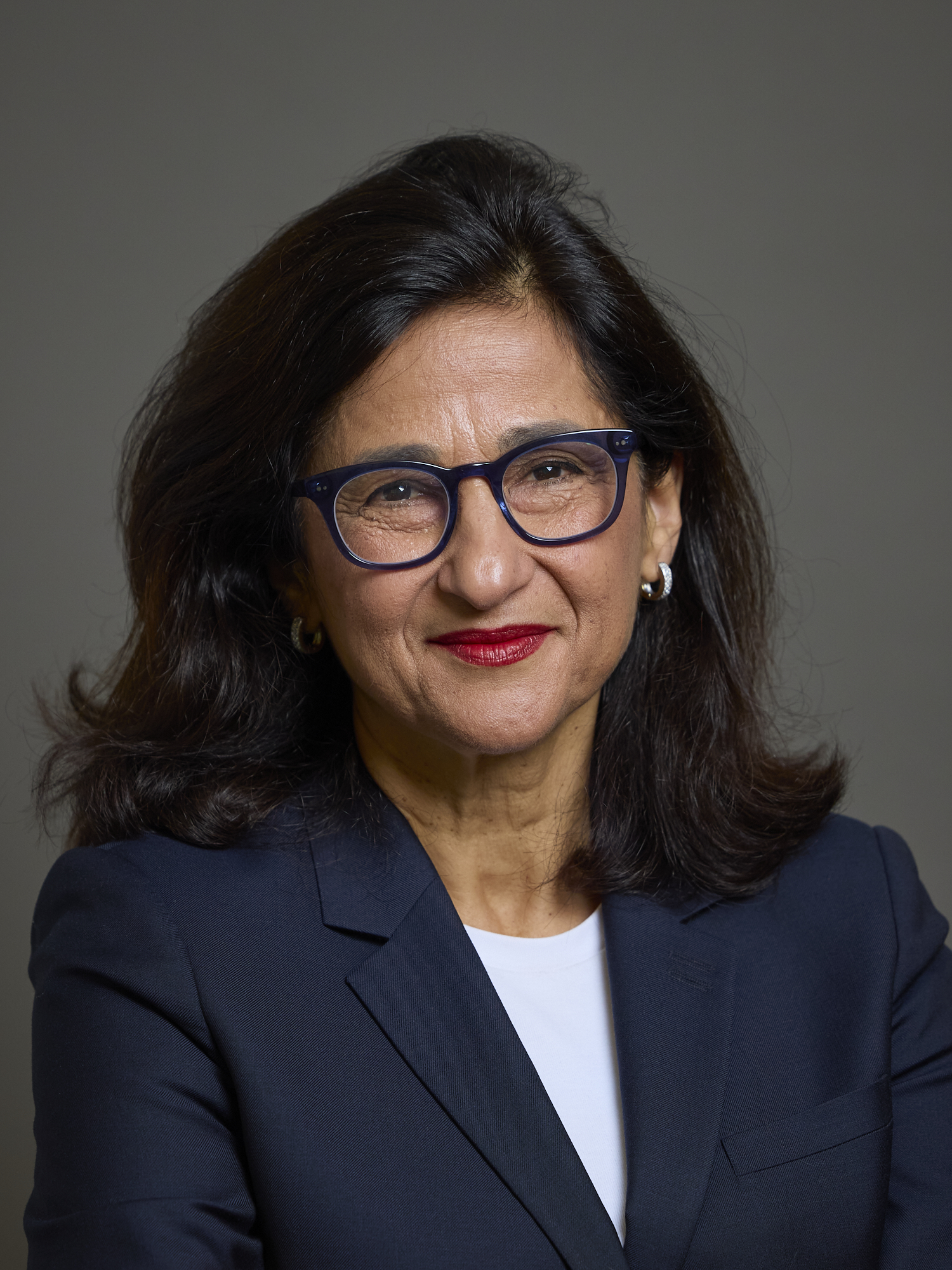
- Official portrait, 2025

20th President of Columbia University
- In office 1 July 2023 – 14 August 2024
- Preceded by: Lee Bollinger
- Succeeded by: Katrina Armstrong (interim)

President and Vice Chancellor of the London School of Economics
- In office 1 September 2017 – 1 July 2023
- Preceded by: Craig Calhoun (2016)
- Succeeded by: Larry Kramer

Deputy Governor of the Bank of England for Markets and Banking
- In office 1 August 2014 – 28 February 2017
- Governor: Mark Carney
- Preceded by: Position established
- Succeeded by: Charlotte Hogg

Member of the House of Lords
- Lord Temporal
- Life peerage 30 September 2020

Personal details
- Born: Nemat Talaat Shafik; 13 August 1962 (age 64) Alexandria, Egypt
- Citizenship: United Kingdom; United States; Egypt
- Party: None (crossbencher)
- Spouses: Mohamed El-Erian (divorced); Raffael Jovine (m. 2002)
- Education: American University in Cairo; University of Massachusetts, Amherst (BA); London School of Economics (MSc); St Antony's College, Oxford (DPhil)
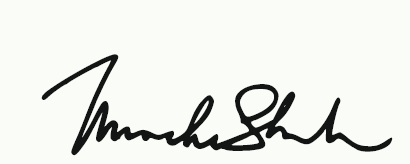
- Signature

Nemat Talaat Shafik, Baroness Shafik (born 13 August 1962), commonly known as Minouche Shafik, is a British-American academic and economist. She was the president and vice chancellor of the London School of Economics from 2017 to 2023 and then the 20th president of Columbia University from 2023 to 2024. She was appointed as the Chief Economic Advisor to Prime Minister Keir Starmer on 1 September 2025.

From 2014 to 2017, Shafik served as a deputy governor of the Bank of England and also previously as permanent secretary of the United Kingdom's Department for International Development from 2008 to 2011. She has also served as a vice president at the World Bank and as a deputy managing director of the International Monetary Fund. She has been a member of the House of Lords as a life peer since 2020.

Shafik was head of Columbia University during the 2024 Columbia University protests. On 17 April 2024, Shafik testified before the United States House Committee on Education and the Workforce regarding antisemitism on the Columbia University campus. From student protests, congressional investigations, faculty, and lawmakers, she had been pressured to resign her position. She resigned from the office on 14 August 2024. In January 2025, she was appointed chair of the Victoria and Albert Museum.

== Early life and education ==
Shafik was born in Alexandria, Egypt, to Muslim parents who were both educators. Her father was a scientist and wealthy landowner. As a child, she went to Schutz American School. When she was four, the Egyptian government nationalized (brought into public ownership) her father's property and the family moved to Savannah, Georgia in the mid-1960s, then to Miami and Raleigh, North Carolina.

Shafik was educated for a year at the American University in Cairo. She then graduated with a Bachelor of Arts, summa cum laude and Phi Beta Kappa, with a major in economics and politics from the University of Massachusetts Amherst in 1983. She gained a Master of Science degree in economics from the London School of Economics in 1986, then a D.Phil. in economics from the University of Oxford in 1989.

== Economic career ==
After Oxford, Shafik joined the World Bank and held a variety of roles, starting in the research department where she worked on global economic modelling and forecasting and then later on environmental issues. She moved to do macroeconomic work on Europe and the Middle East where she published a number of books and articles on the region's economic future, the economics of peace, labour markets, regional integration, and gender issues. At age 36, Shafik became the World Bank's youngest-ever Vice President.

Shafik has held academic appointments, as adjunct professor in the Economics Department at Georgetown University from 1989 to 1994, and as visiting associate professor at the Wharton Business School of the University of Pennsylvania in Spring 1996.

She initially went to the British Government's Department for International Development (DFID) on secondment as Director General for Country Programmes where she was responsible for all of DFID's overseas offices and financing across Africa, the Middle East, Asia, Latin America, and Eastern Europe. She was appointed as DFID's Permanent Secretary in 2008 where she managed a bilateral aid programme in over 100 countries, multilateral policies and financing for the United Nations, European Union and international financial institutions, and overall development policy and research – responsible for 2400 staff and a budget of £38 billion (about US$60 billion) for 2011–2014.

Shafik served as IMF Deputy Managing Director from April 2011 until March 2014. As Deputy Managing Director, she oversaw the IMF's work in Europe and the Middle East, a $1 billion administrative budget, human resources for its 3,000 staff and the IMF's training and technical assistance for policy makers around the world.

Shafik joined the Bank of England as its first Deputy Governor on Markets and Banking responsible for the Bank's £500 billion balance sheet and served as a Member of the bank's Monetary Policy Committee, Financial Policy Committee and the Board of the Prudential Regulatory Authority. She led the Bank's Fair and Effective Markets review to tackle misconduct in financial markets.

== Presidencies ==
=== London School of Economics ===
On 12 September 2016, it was announced that Shafik had been appointed as the next Director of the London School of Economics, replacing sociologist Craig Calhoun. She took up the post on 1 September 2017.

=== Columbia University ===
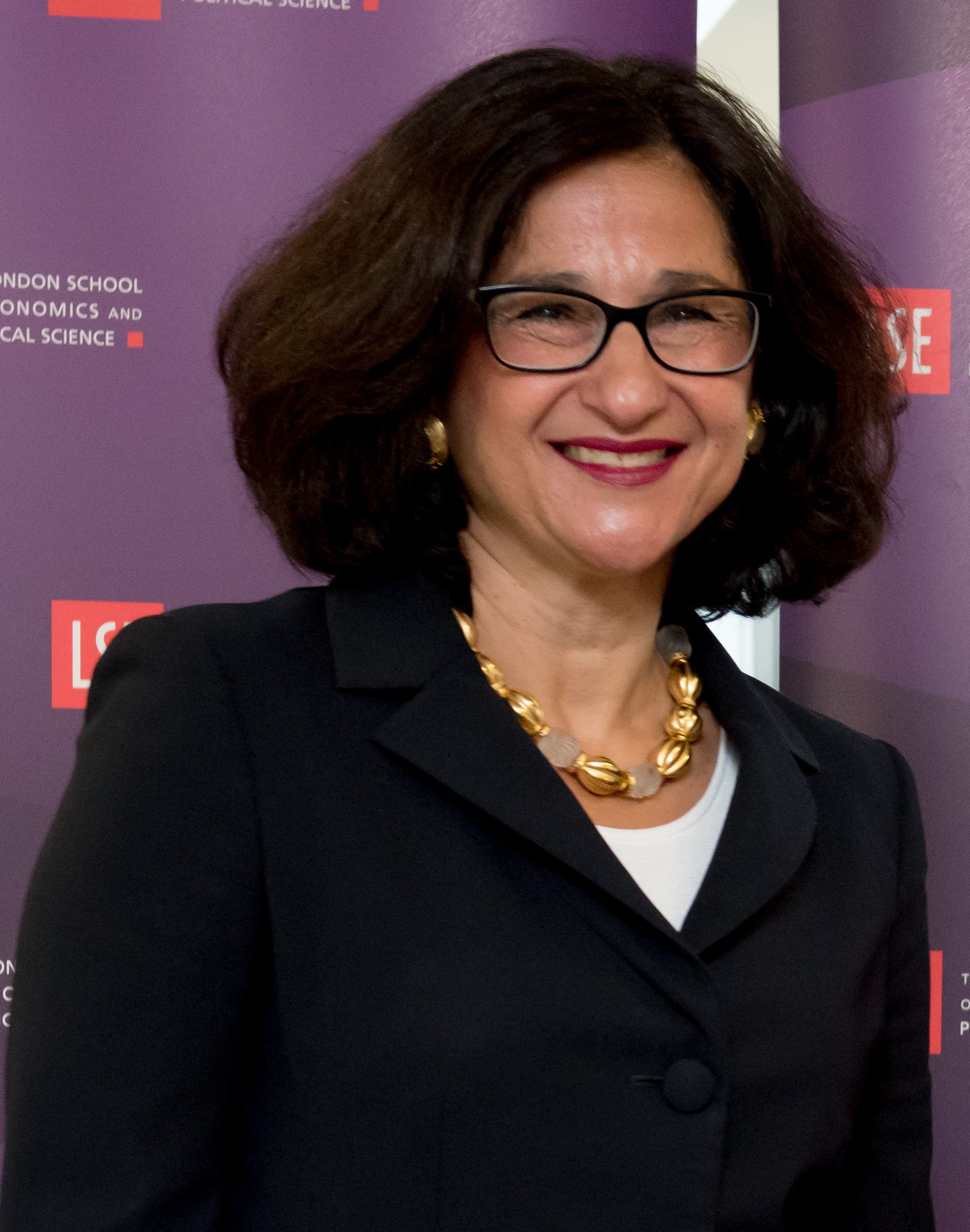
Shafik in 2020

On 18 January 2023, Columbia University's board of trustees announced Shafik's appointment as president of the university. She became president of Columbia University on 1 July 2023. Her inauguration occurred on 4 October 2023.

==== Columbia University pro-Palestinian campus protests during the Gaza war ====
After the Gaza war intensified in October 2023, and an altercation concerning an Israeli student led to legal action, Shafik issued a statement saying that if "speech is unlawful or violates University rules, it will not be tolerated". While some, including US House of Representative member Ritchie Torres, and US Congresswoman Kathy Manning, said she should have done more to protect Jewish students from anti-Semitic violence on campus; faculty and graduate workers raised concerns over her decision to suspend pro-Palestine student groups such as Jewish Voice for Peace (JVP) and Students for Justice in Palestine (SJP) from the campus for repeatedly violating University policies relating to on campus events.

==== US Congress hearings on campus antisemitism during the Gaza war ====
In November 2023, Shafik was invited to attend the 2023 United States Congress hearing on antisemitism, but declined, citing a scheduling conflict. She later gave testimony before the United States House Committee on Education & the Workforce on 17 April 2024, along with David Greenwald and Claire Shipman, co-chairs of the Trustees of Columbia University. Former presidential advisors and consultants Shailagh Murray, Dana Remus, and Philippe Reines, along with lawyers, political officials, and experts on antisemitism prepared Shafik for the hearing for months.

==== Gaza Solidarity Encampment ====
As a result of campus protests and the campus occupation by pro-Palestinian demonstrators that began on 17 April 2024, Shafik called on the NYPD to clear an encampment established by protesters near the center of the university's campus, and police arrested more than 100 students on 22 April. The same day, she announced that the university had canceled in-person classes to move to hybrid learning. The demonstrations outside Columbia's campus sometimes included pro-Hamas antisemitic hate speech and threats, resulting in protesters targeting some Jewish students.

Shafik established a headquarters to address the protests at the law firm of Covington & Burling near the White House when she was in Washington, D.C., to testify before the United States House Committee on Education & the Workforce. Her actions in ordering the arrests were criticised by the American Association of University Professors, PEN America, president Serene Jones of Union Theological Seminary, and the Columbia College Student Council. Faculty denounced what it called an "unprecedented assault on student rights". Hundreds of Columbia professors staged a walkout and signed onto an open letter criticizing her handling of the demonstrations.

Columbia donor and alumnus Robert Kraft, founder of Columbia's Foundation to Combat Antisemitism, suspended donations to the university, as did billionaire Len Blavatnik, due to beliefs that Columbia was insufficiently preventing campus antisemitism. Republican lawmakers, whom Shafik initially intended to appeal to in her congressional testimony, called for her resignation. These included House Speaker Mike Johnson and at least a dozen members of Congress who claimed that the school failed to protect Jewish students.

Both Democratic and Republican officials joined Representative Elise Stefanik in urging Shafik to resign, including U.S. Senators John Fetterman and Tim Scott, and Representative Jim Banks. Columbia University's senate drafted and circulated a censure resolution against Shafik for abridging "the fundamental requirements of academic freedom" and causing an "unprecedented assault on student rights". A few days later, the university senate stopped short of a censure vote, instead calling out Shafik and her administration for "breaching the due-process rights of students and professors" and called for further investigation into the matter.

On 29 April 2024, Shafik announced that negotiations with student protesters stalled and that the "university will not divest from Israel". She requested NYPD intervention for the second time in two weeks the following day, leading to the arrest of an additional 108 individuals. She also requested an NYPD presence through at least 17 May, two days after the scheduled commencement, which she later cancelled on 6 May. Instead, Shafik conferred degrees via e-mail. The Columbia Faculty of Arts and Sciences initiated a vote of no-confidence on 10 May. The motion criticised Shafik's decisions to have students arrested and impose a campus lock-down with an on-going police presence. It also said her plans to fire and investigate faculty members for comments they made about Israel were "clear violations" of academic freedom. It passed on 16 May, with 65 percent of the 709 professors voting in favor of the resolution.

According to Jason Brownlee, Minouche Shafik's invocation of Title VI of the Civil Rights Act of 1964 in her April 29, 2024 statement was legally incoherent but provided "shield and sword for her actions as university president" to justify "pitting cops against demonstrators." Brownlee writes that "Shafik and her peers sought to wrap their suppression of pro-Palestine advocacy in the mantle of America’s civil rights traditions", and thereby "denied pro-Palestine groups’ claim to civil rights of their own."

On 14 August 2024, Shafik resigned from the presidency. Following her resignation, she announced that she would be accepting a role with the Secretary of State for Foreign, Commonwealth and Development Affairs to chair a review of the British government's approach to international development.

== Academic work ==
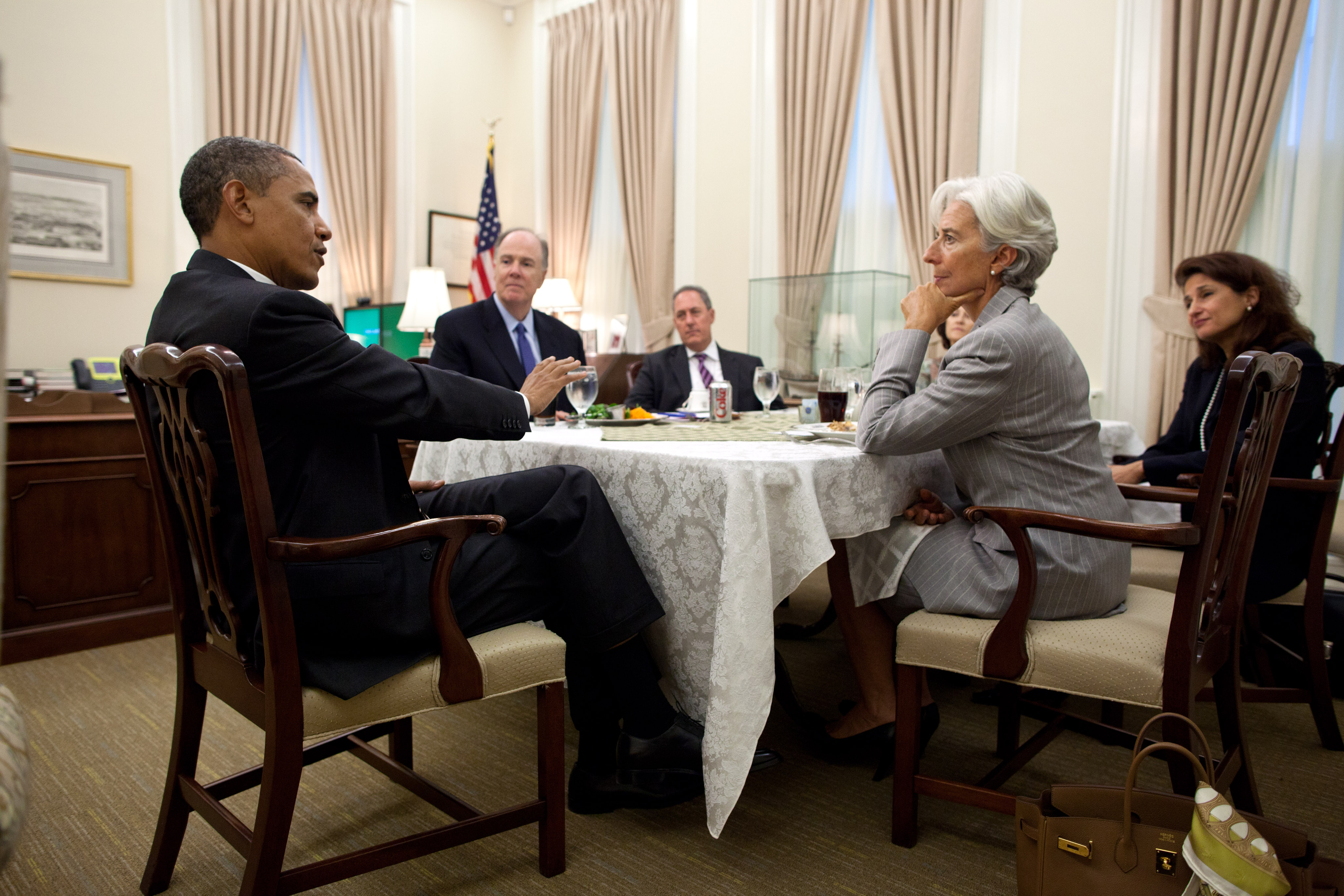
Shafik on the far right with Barack Obama and Christine Lagarde, 2011

Shafik has authored Prospects for the Middle East and North African Economies: from Boom to Bust and Back? (1998) and What We Owe Each Other: A New Social Contract for a Better Society (2021). She was also the editor of Economic Challenges Facing Middle Eastern and North African Countries (1998).

She has written articles for publications including Oxford Economic Papers, The Middle East Journal, Journal of African Finance and Economic Development, World Development, and the Journal of Development Economics.

== Other activities ==
Shafik has chaired several international consultative groups including: the Consultative Group to Assist the Poor, the Energy Sector Management Assistance Programme, the Global Water and Sanitation Program, Cities Alliance, InfoDev, the Public-Private Infrastructure Advisory Facility, and the Global Corporate Governance Forum. She served on a number of boards including the Middle East Advisory Group to the International Monetary Fund, and the Economic Research Forum for the Arab World, Iran and Turkey. She is also active on the board and as a mentor to the Minority Ethnic Talent Association which supports under-represented groups to advance to senior positions in the civil service.

Shafik currently serves as a Trustee of the Council of the Institute for Fiscal Studies, the Task Force on Fiscal Policy for Health, the New Economy Forum, and the Per Jacobsson Foundation.

In 2021, she was appointed to the Pandemic Preparedness Partnership (PPP), an expert group chaired by Patrick Vallance to advise the G7 presidency held by the government of Prime Minister Boris Johnson.

Shafik was appointed as a trustee of the Bill & Melinda Gates Foundation in January 2022.

In a 2023 piece published on the International Monetary Fund's website, as part of the promotion of her book, What We Owe Each Other: A New Social Contract, Shafik indicated that she was worried about 'cancel culture' on university campuses, commenting: "The point of university is to be intellectually challenged and confronted with difference." She argued that universities needed to 'teach people to have difficult conversations', adding: “It’s through that process of listening that you learn, you build consensus, and you move forward as a community."

In January 2025, Shafik was appointed chair of the Victoria and Albert Museum.

== Recognition ==
Shafik was made a Dame Commander of the Order of the British Empire (DBE) in the June 2015 Queen's Birthday Honours.

She was named "GG2 Woman of the Year" in 2009. She was named as one of Forbes 100 most powerful women in 2015 and received the 100 Women in Finance European Industry Leaders Award in 2019.

She was gazetted as Baroness Shafik, of Camden in the London Borough of Camden and of Alexandria in the Arab Republic of Egypt, in the 2020 Political Honours and was introduced to the House of Lords on 15 October 2020. She sat as a crossbencher and made her maiden speech on 28 January 2021. Shafik took a leave of absence from the House of Lords in July 2023, which ended by February 2025.

Shafik was elected an honorary fellow of the British Academy in 2021 and was awarded an honorary doctorate from Utrecht University. She has also been awarded a number of honorary doctorates: a Doctor of Laws from the University of Warwick (2012), a DLitt from the University of Glasgow (2017), a Doctor of Humane Letters from the American University of Beirut (2018), a Doctor of Science from the University of Reading (2019), and a Doctor of Laws from Columbia University (2023).

== Personal life ==
Shafik married economist Mohamed El-Erian in 1990 during their time working for the World Bank and International Monetary Fund, respectively. In 2002, Shafik married her second husband, scientist Raffael Jovine, with whom she has twin children and three stepchildren.

Shafik is a dual American and British citizen and speaks English, Arabic, and French.

== Sources ==
- "New top civil servant for DFID". DFID.gov.uk. 9 June 2011. Archived from the original on 12 June 2011.

Government offices
Preceded by Dame Nicola Brewer	Director-General, Country Programmes at the Department for International Development; 2004–2008	Succeeded by Sir Mark Lowcock
Preceded by Sir Suma Chakrabarti	Permanent Secretary of the Department for International Development; 2008–2011	Succeeded by Sir Mark Lowcock
Academic offices
Preceded by Lee Bollinger	20th President of Columbia University; 2023–	Incumbent
