= Harvard v. Department of Health and Human Services =

2025 US legal case

President and Fellows of Harvard College v. United States Department of Health and Human Services, et al.
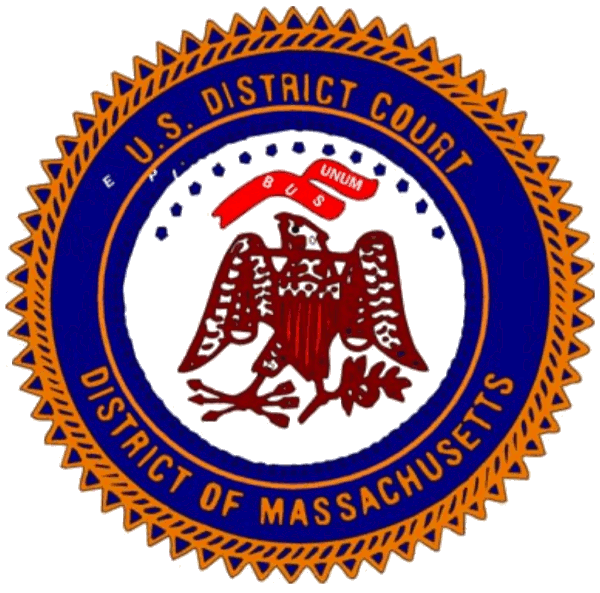
- Court: United States District Court for the District of Massachusetts
- Full case name: President and Fellows of Harvard College v. United States Department of Health and Human Services, National Institutes of Health, Robert F. Kennedy Jr., United States Department of Justice, Pamela J. Bondi, United States Department of Education, Linda McMahon, United States General Services Administration, Stephen Ehikian, United States Department of Energy, Christopher A. Wright, United States National Science Foundation, Sethuraman Panchanathan, United States Department of Defense, Peter B. Hegseth, National Aeronautics and Space Administration, Janet E. Petro
- Started: April 21, 2025
- Citation: 1:25-cv-11048

Court membership
- Judge sitting: Allison Burroughs

President and Fellows of Harvard College v. United States Department of Health and Human Services, et al. is a lawsuit filed in April 2025 by the Harvard Corporation against the Trump administration over the suspension of hundreds of millions of dollars in federal research funding. On September 3, Judge Allison D. Burroughs ruled in favor of Harvard, finding the government had violated its free speech rights and used allegations of antisemitism as a "smokescreen for a targeted, ideologically-motivated assault on this country's premier universities".

== Background ==
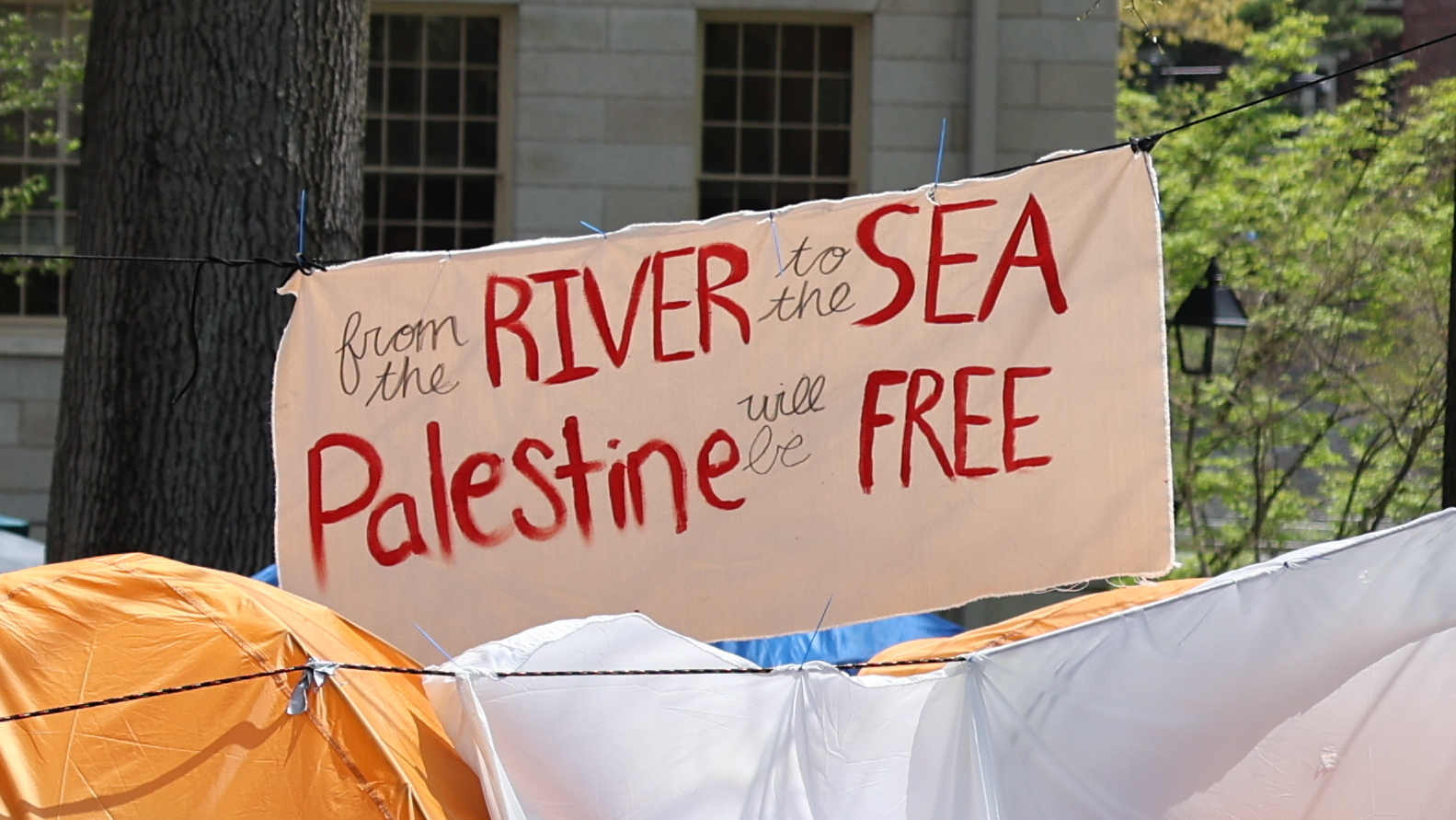
A banner displayed at an encampment in Harvard Yard in front of University Hall reads "from the river to the sea, Palestine will be free," May 2024.

During the Gaza war and alleged genocide, Harvard has been among universities where there have been protest and activism in solidarity with the Palestinians in Gaza, which the Trump administration has called antisemitic. Harvard was among the ten US universities targeted by the federal government's Joint Task Force to Combat Anti-Semitism and to which the federal government has cut funding—a move seen as reflecting prescriptions in Project Esther, part of The Heritage Foundation's political initiative Project 2025. According to The New York Times, "the Trump administration’s biggest target has been Harvard, the country’s richest university. The university has roughly $9 billion at stake in its fight with the federal government."

According to university president Alan Garber, funding for research at Harvard was affected by a federal grant pause imposed in January 2025. The pause was later halted by a court order. Garber later criticized funding cuts at the National Institute of Health that would reduce grants at Harvard Medical School. John Shaw, the vice provost for research, submitted a declaration with a lawsuit filed by thirteen universities, though Harvard did not join the lawsuit. In March, the Trump administration stated it would conduct a review of US$9 billion in federal funding to Harvard University.

April 11, 2025 letter sent to Harvard by Trump officials, April 2025

The administration's prescription [...] violates Harvard’s First Amendment rights and exceeds the statutory limits of the government's authority [...] And it threatens our values as a private institution devoted to the pursuit, production, and dissemination of knowledge. No government—regardless of which party is in power—should dictate what private universities can teach, whom they can admit and hire, and which areas of study and inquiry they can pursue.

— Harvard University's response to the Trump administration, April 14, 2025

In April 2025, Harvard University negotiated with the Trump administration for two weeks in an attempt to reach an agreement, such as that made by Columbia, to avoid the loss of government funding. Afterwards, a government lawyer from the administration sent a letter to Harvard demanding changes in its curriculum, hiring, and admissions policies, including hiring a third party acceptable to the Trump administration to audit "viewpoint diversity". Government officials later said that the letter had been sent in error.

Harvard publicly rejected the Trump administration's demands and called them an illegal overreach of government authority. In response, the administration announced that it had frozen $2.3 billion in federal research funding for the university. In addition, Trump asked the Internal Revenue Service to revoke Harvard's tax-exempt status. The U.S. Department of Homeland Security also told the university that it needed to share with the government detailed records about its foreign students—including "relevant information" about students holding student visas that had been involved in "known illegal" or "dangerous" activity, and information about the coursework of all student visa holders—or else it would lose its ability to enroll international students. Harvard responded by filing the Harvard v. Department of Health and Human Services lawsuit against the Trump administration in the District Court of Massachusetts, arguing that the freezing of funds was unconstitutional.

Decertification Letter sent by Kristi Noem on May 22, 2025

On May 22, 2025, Department of Homeland Security secretary Kristi Noem informed Harvard that their Student and Exchange Visitor Program certification was revoked, and therefore they were now prohibited from hosting international students. Subsequently, US district court judge Jeffrey White issued an injunction, blocking the Trump administration from revoking the legal status of international students in US universities.

On May 23, 2025, Harvard sued the Trump administration for banning them from enrolling international students. The same day, US district court judge Allison Burroughs issued a temporary restraining order, blocking the revocation of Harvard's certification.

On May 27, 2025, the State Department ordered all US embassies to pause interviewing applicants for student visas, pending further guidance on "expanded social media vetting for all such applicants".

On May 30, 2025, the State Department ordered all US embassies and consulates to conduct "comprehensive and thorough vetting" of the online presence of anyone seeking to visit Harvard from abroad.

== Lawsuit ==
On April 21, 2025, the President and Fellows of Harvard College sued several Trump officials, including secretary of health and human services Robert F. Kennedy Jr., secretary of education Linda McMahon, acting administrator of the General Services Administration Stephen Ehikian, and attorney general Pam Bondi, as well as their agencies, in the United States District Court for the District of Massachusetts. Harvard alleged that the Trump administration had levied its response to the university as "leverage to gain control of academic decision-making at Harvard."

On September 2, The Boston Globe reported that the government's lawyer, Michael Velchik, had previously submitted a paper written from the perspective of Adolf Hitler while a senior at Harvard and later wrote to a friend that he enjoyed Mein Kampf more than any other book he'd read.

== Legal proceedings ==
On July 21, 2025, Harvard and the Department of Justice made arguments before judge Allison Burroughs in court. On September 3, Burroughs ruled in favor of Harvard, writing that the government had infringed upon Harvard's free speech rights and that it was "difficult to conclude anything other than that defendants used antisemitism as a smokescreen for a targeted, ideologically-motivated assault on this country's premier universities". On December 18, the Justice Department filed an appeal.

== See also ==
- Education policy of the second Donald Trump administration
- Academic freedom
- Columbia University's settlement with the Trump administration
