= Columbia University Senate =

The Columbia University Senate is a legislative body at Columbia University with policymaking and advisory functions, composed of faculty members, students, researchers and other staff, alumni, and members of the University's administration. It was established after the 1968 Columbia University protests to advance shared governance at the university.

== History ==
=== Background ===
In the aftermath of the 1968 Columbia University protests centered around Columbia's ties to the Vietnam War and racism and racial inequality in the US, a Joint Committee on Disciplinary Affairs (JDCA) was established on May 2, following the arrests of over 700 student protesters on April 30, in order to administer the discipline of student protesters.

The 1968 Cox Commission Report, produced by a body convened by the faculty to investigate the causes of the protests, found that the ineffective or lacking channels of communication between the university's administration, faculty, and students were at the root of the problem. The report implicitly supported the idea of establishing a representative university senate.

=== Formation ===
The University Senate was established after the violent crackdown on student protesters in 1968 in the service of the principle of shared governance, to ensure the participation of faculty members, students, and staff in issues that affecting the university.

At a faculty meeting on September 12, 1968, Professor Michael I. Sovern of the Law School proposed a University Senate led by faculty members. Pressure from students and trustees led to their inclusion. On June 4, 1973, the Trustees of Columbia University in the City of New York established the Rules of University Conduct, disbanded the JCDA, and put a similar body in its place.

=== Gaza solidarity protests ===
==== The Sundial Report ====
On March 31, 2025, the University Senate published The Sundial Report, a 335–page chronology of events around the 2023-24 protests at Columbia prepared by a group within the senate. The report was critical of how the administration handled the campus protests and occupations during the Gaza war. The report revealed, for example, that the "Hind's Hall" occupation of Hamilton Hall could have ended without calling in the New York City Police Department. The New York Law Journal reported that the Stand Columbia Society, a group led by faculty members, published The Sunlight Report, a reappraisal of The Sundial Report.

==== University Judicial Board ====
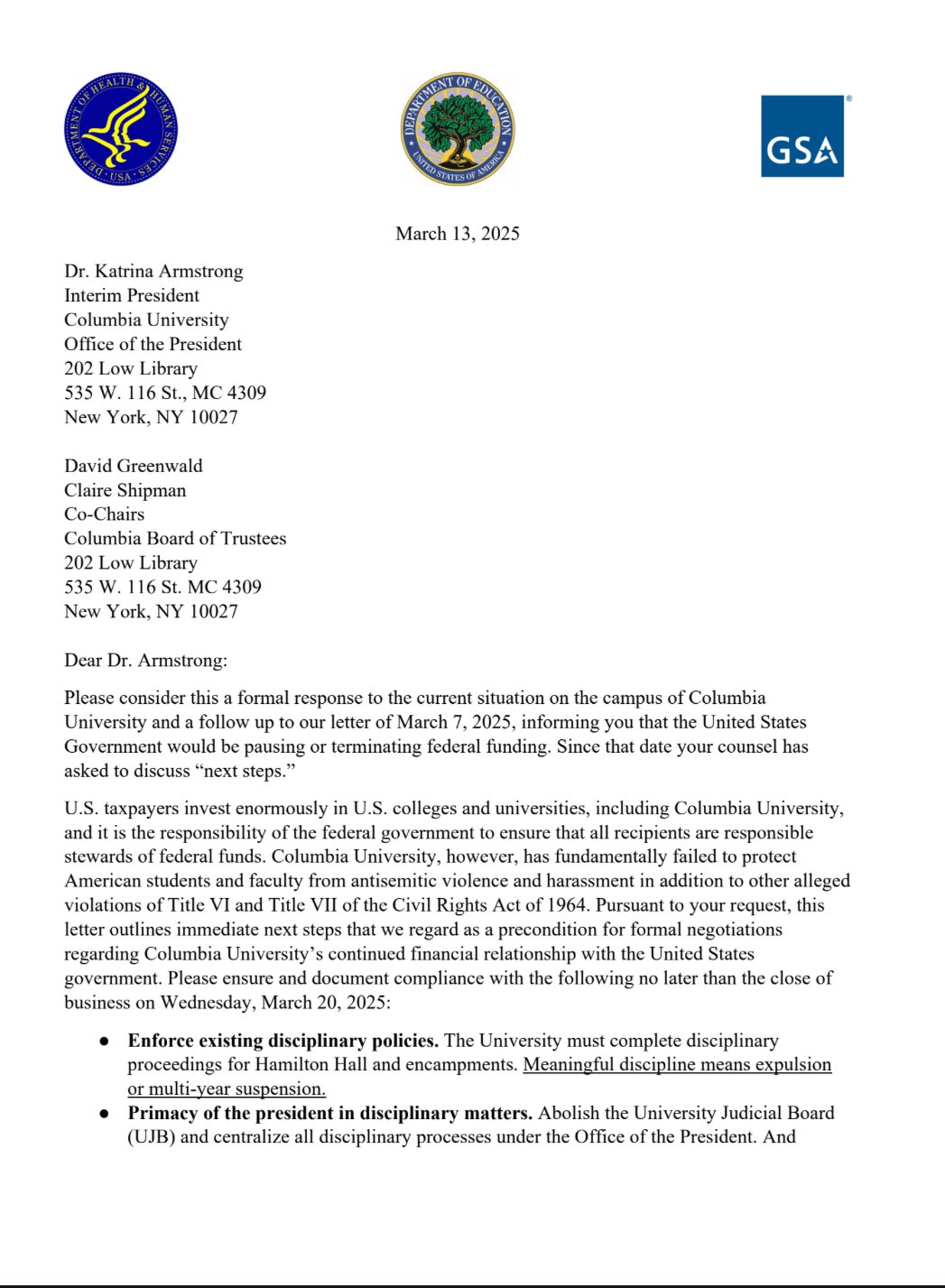
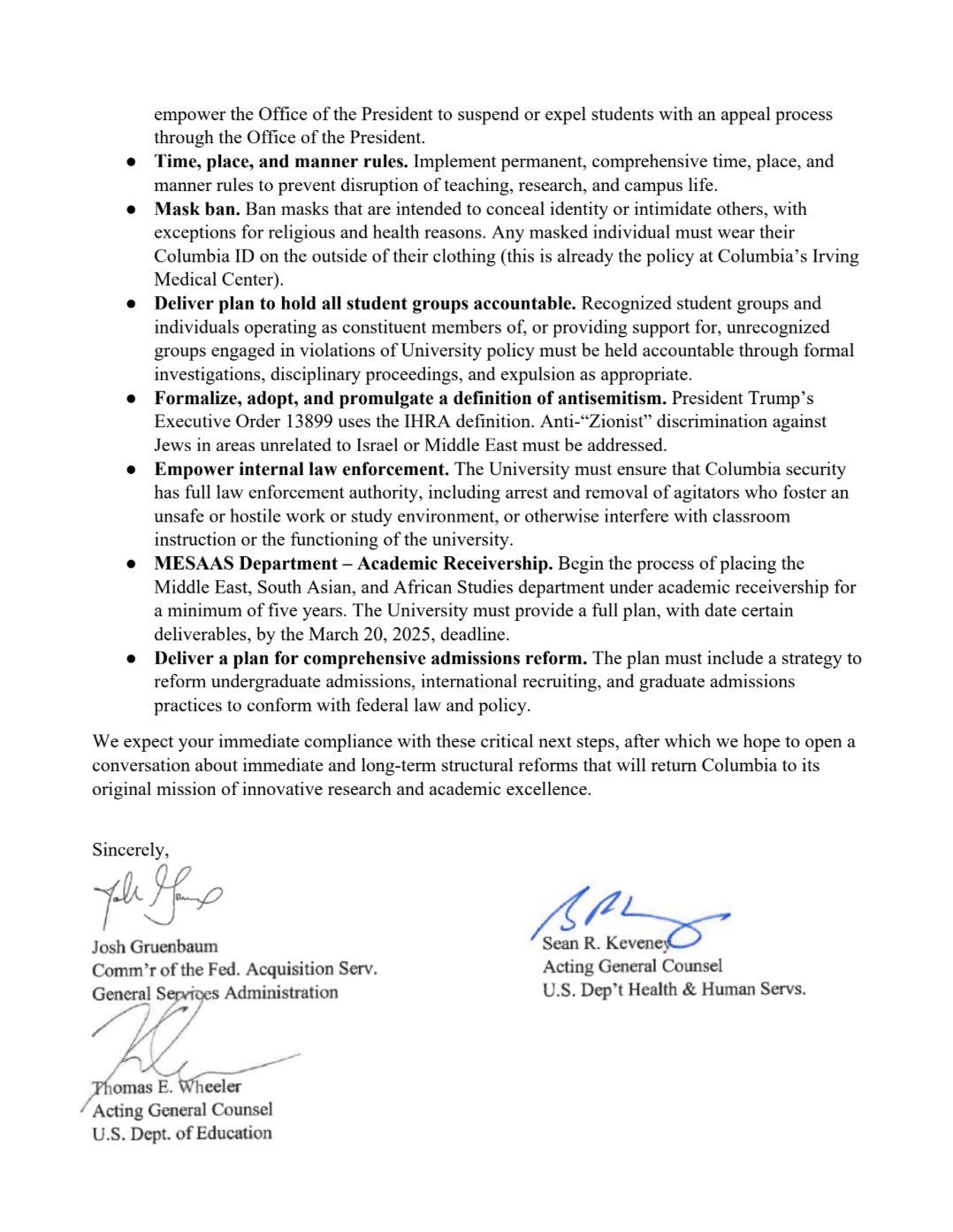
In March 2025, the Trump administration made various demands of Columbia after cutting $400 million in federal funding to the university, including the demands that the university abolish the UJB in order to "centralize all disciplinary processes" under the authority of the university president. Columbia accepted the demands and eventually agreed to a $221 million settlement with the Trump administration.

The University Judicial Board (UJB), a body consisting of a five-member panel responsible for adjudicating university disciplinary cases according to the Rules of University Conduct, is under the purview of the University Senate. After cutting $400 million in federal research funding from Columbia on March 7, the Trump administration issued the university a list of demands on March 14 that included the abolishment of the UJB in order to "centralize all disciplinary processes" under the authority of the university president. Columbia agreed to these demands.

In the same month, while negotiating with the Trump administration over the restitution of its federal funding, Columbia removed student representatives from the UJB. The Columbia Daily Spectator reported that cases relating to the May 7, 2025 "Basel Al-Araj Popular University" occupation of Butler Library were the first to have the nomination process for the members of the UJB panel under the Office of the Provost instead of the University Senate. The Office of the Profost was also made responsible for the alteration and interpretation of the Rules of University Conduct, which had been the purview of the University Senate since it was established in 1969.

In conformity to the Trump administration's demands, Columbia's July 2025 settlement with the Trump administration forbade the practice of students participating on UJB panels for disciplinary hearings, requiring that the university's disciplinary processes be contained within the Office of the Provost. The Columbia Daily Spectator reported in the summer of 2025 that the Trustees of Columbia University "quietly stripped the University Senate’s authority to oversee disciplinary procedures" by making "changes to the University Statutes, which include the Rules and outline the formal powers of the University Senate."

==== Senate review ====
On April 18, shortly after delivering her first address as acting president in her first meeting with the University Senate on April 4, Claire Shipman, who left her position as co-chair of the board of trustees to replace interim president Katrina Armstrong and become acting president of the university on March 28, announced in an email to the Columbia University community that the University Senate would be subject to review. According to The New York Times, the move was an "effort to potentially diminish the university senate’s authority," and one that Shipman and the trustees have used "vague language" to explain. University Senators expressed concern that the impending review threatened shared governance at the university.

On April 23, 2026, the co-chairs of the board of trustees, David Greenwald and Jeh Johnson, released a report dated December 2025 on the review of the University Senate, which included 15 recommendations, along with four internal changes to trustee processes.
