= Womenomics: Write Your Own Rules for Success =

Womenomics
- Book cover
- Author: Claire Shipman; Katty Kay
- Language: English
- Genre: Careers, Women
- Publisher: HarperCollins
- Publication date: June 2, 2009
- Publication place: United States
- Media type: Hardback, Audiobook
- Pages: 256
- ISBN: 978-0-06-169718-0
- OCLC: 263982059
- Dewey Decimal: 650.1082 22
- LC Class: HD6053 .S534 2009

Womenomics: Write Your Own Rules for Success is a non-fiction book written by ABC News' Good Morning America senior national correspondent Claire Shipman and BBC World News America Washington correspondent Katty Kay that was published by HarperCollins on June 2, 2009.

The word womenics is a portmanteau of women and economics. Additionally, the word womenomics applies to a concept Shipman and Kay have termed for what they see as an upcoming paradigm shift in the way individuals and companies approach work, due to an increase in the value of women in the workforce and changing attitudes of women towards priorities of balancing work and personal life.

== Summary ==
In Womenomics, Shipman and Kay explore the theory that trends in the current business world have allowed women to leverage their value in order to redefine success. To support this idea, the authors collect evidence showing a concurrent increase in value to companies of female management and an increase in priority to women of workplace flexibility. According to the authors, the book functions both to present these findings and to provide "advice, guidance, and fact-based support that proves you don’t have to do it all to have it all." Based on findings from the research done for the book, Shipman and Kay are expanding Womenomics conceptually to include a website incorporating analysis from guest bloggers and news coverage on the shifting roles of women in the workplace.

== Contents ==
- Introduction
- Chapter 1: Womenomics 101
- Chapter 2: What We Really Want
- Chapter 3: Redefining Success-It's All in Your Mind
- Chapter 4: Good-bye Guilt (and Hello No)
- Chapter 5: Lazy Like a Fox: Work Smarter Not Harder
- Chapter 6: Value Added: Redefine Your Value, Value Your Time
- Chapter 7: Nine Rules to Negotiate Nirvan: How to Change Your Whole Work Deal
- Chapter 8: A Womenomics World
- Epilogue
