= Joint Task Force to Combat Anti-Semitism =

Task force created by Donald Trump

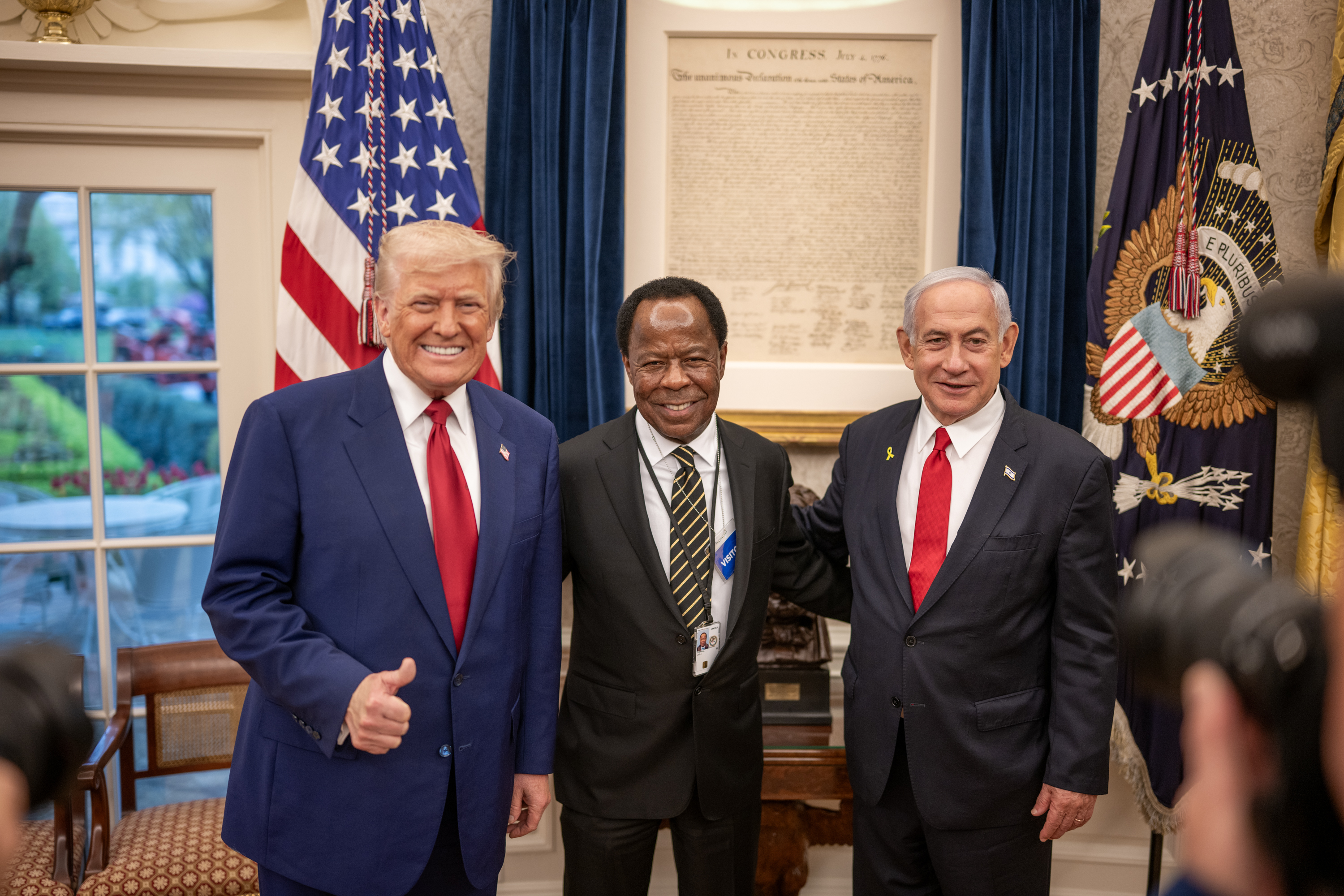
Leo Terrell, the head of the Trump administration's Task Force to Combat Antisemitism, with President Donald Trump and Israeli Prime Minister Benjamin Netanyahu on April 7, 2025

The Joint Task Force to Combat Anti-Semitism was announced by the US Department of Justice within the first two weeks of the second presidency of Donald Trump. Its initial priority was to "root out antisemitic harassment in schools and on college campuses." It is led by Leo Terrell. The Task Force cut funding to ten US universities the Trump administration accused of antisemitism, including Columbia University, Harvard University, the University of California, Los Angeles, and others with the Department of Justice, Department of Health and Human Services, Department of Education, and the General Services Administration as members of the action.

According to The New York Times, the Trump administration closely followed actions prescribed by Project Esther—a guideline for dealing with the Gaza war protests which it characterized as antisemitic—from The Heritage Foundation, the think tank behind Project 2025.

According to the Jewish Telegraphic Agency, "at least eight individuals and organizations affiliated with Heritage’s National Task Force to Combat Antisemitism, launched last year under the Project Esther banner, have resigned or threatened to do so, citing Heritage president Kevin Roberts’ decision to stand by Tucker Carlson and his description of the television personality's critics as a 'venomous coalition.'" In November 2025, the Task Force to Combat Anti-Semitism severed ties with the Heritage Foundation.

== See also ==
- Columbia University's settlement with the Trump administration
- Harvard v. Department of Health and Human Services
