= Leo Terrell =

American civil rights attorney and talk radio host

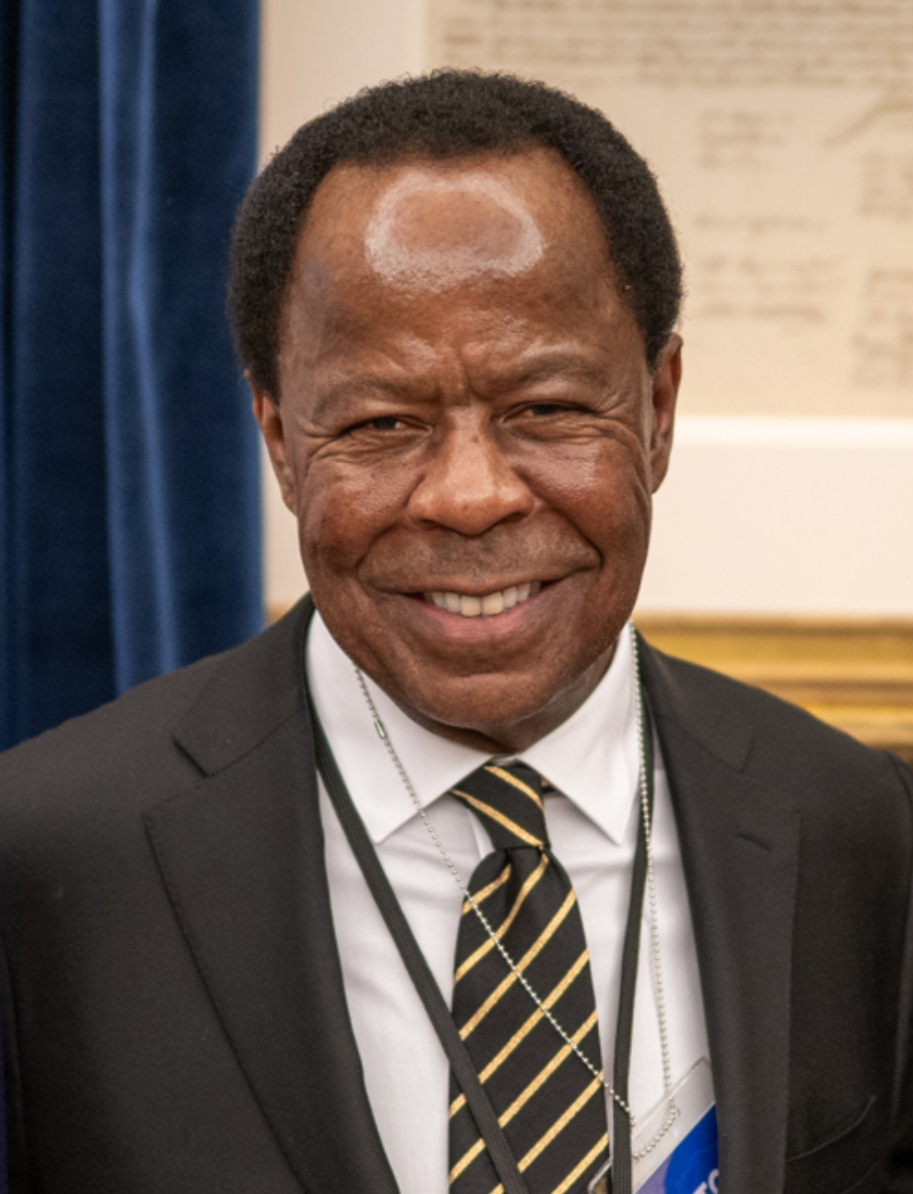
- Terrell in 2025
- Born: Leo James Terrell; February 1, 1955 (age 71); United States
- Education: California State University, Dominguez Hills (BA); Pepperdine University (MA); University of California, Los Angeles (JD)
- Occupations: Civil rights attorney; talk show host
- Political party: Democratic (before 2020); Republican (since 2020)

Leo James Terrell (born February 1, 1955) is an American civil rights attorney and talk radio host based in Los Angeles, California. He has frequently appeared on Fox News programs, such as Hannity and The O'Reilly Factor. Previously a Democrat, in a July 2020 interview, he declared his support for President Donald Trump—the first time he declared support for a Republican Party presidential candidate. In January 2025, President-elect Donald Trump announced his intention to appoint Terrell as Senior Counsel to the Assistant Attorney General for the Civil Rights Division in the United States Department of Justice.

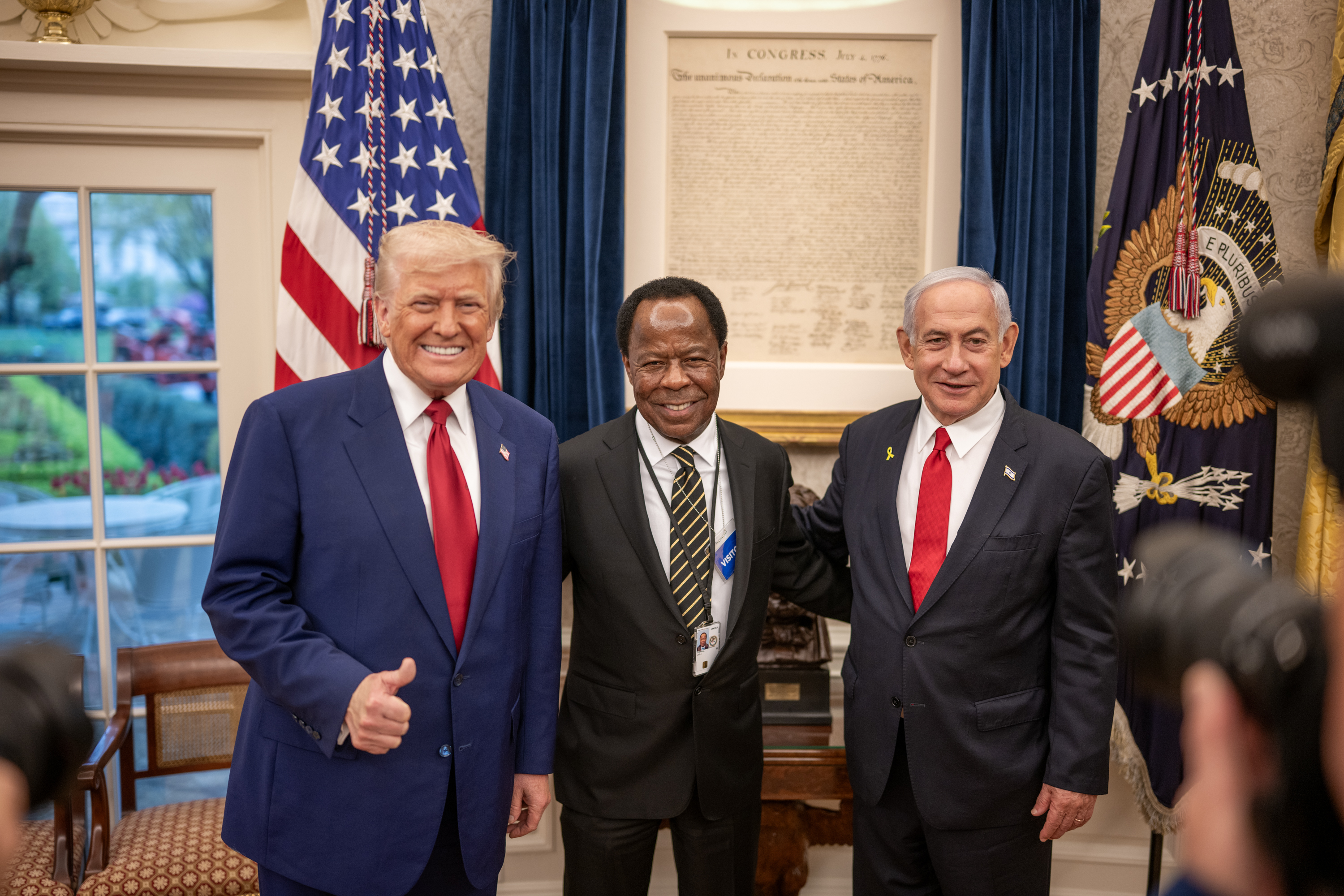
Terrell, President Donald Trump and Israeli Prime Minister Benjamin Netanyahu at the White House, April 7, 2025

== Education ==
Terrell graduated from Gardena High School in Harbor Gateway, Los Angeles, in 1972 and California State University, Dominguez Hills in 1977 with a Bachelor of Arts degree. He was the student body president while at Gardena High.

Terrell taught high school history, geography and economics at Gage Middle School in Huntington Park, California. He holds a master's degree in education from Pepperdine University and earned a Juris Doctor from the UCLA School of Law.

== Radio career ==
With former Los Angeles Superior Court judge Burton Katz, Terrell co-hosted the weekday talk show Terrell & Katz that debuted on June 3, 1996, on KMPC radio in Los Angeles. Terrell & Katz was a point-counterpoint program with Terrell as the liberal voice and Katz the conservative. Starting October 5, 1996, Terrell and Katz moved to weekends on KABC. Terrell continued to host a weekend legal show on KABC until August 15, 2010, and continues to be a recurring guest host for KABC's The Peter Tilden Show. As of July 2021, Leo has returned to KABC with a new daily afternoon drive show called Leo 2.0 Live @ 5.

In a June 3, 2023 Twitter post, Leo Terrell announced he is no longer working at KABC AM 790.

== Legal career ==
On December 4, 1990, Terrell became a member of the State Bar of California.

He was the Chairman of the Black-Korean Alliance, an Advisory Board Member for the U.S. Equal Employment Opportunity Commission (EEOC), and a member of the Statewide Commission Against Hate Crimes. Terrell wrote the book Your Rights at the Workplace--The Things Your Boss Won't Tell You in 1998.

Terrell became a member of the NAACP in 1990 and did pro bono legal work for the organization. After Terrell expressed support for Carolyn Kuhl, a Los Angeles County judge nominated by President George W. Bush to the United States Court of Appeals for the Ninth Circuit whose nomination was filibustered in the U.S. Senate, he left the NAACP and accused the organization of "bullying" him out. NAACP Washington, D.C. office director Hilary O. Shelton responded: "He’s not an NAACP lawyer, not even a former NAACP lawyer. He’s done volunteer work for us, which we appreciate. But when he takes a position that is diametrically opposite from our position, he’s not speaking for us."

Terrell has provided legal and political commentary on TV and radio programs such as Nightline, Larry King Live, Hannity & Colmes, The O'Reilly Factor, Today, Good Morning America, and various radio programs. A family friend of O. J. Simpson, Terrell provided expert legal commentary about Simpson's civil trial.

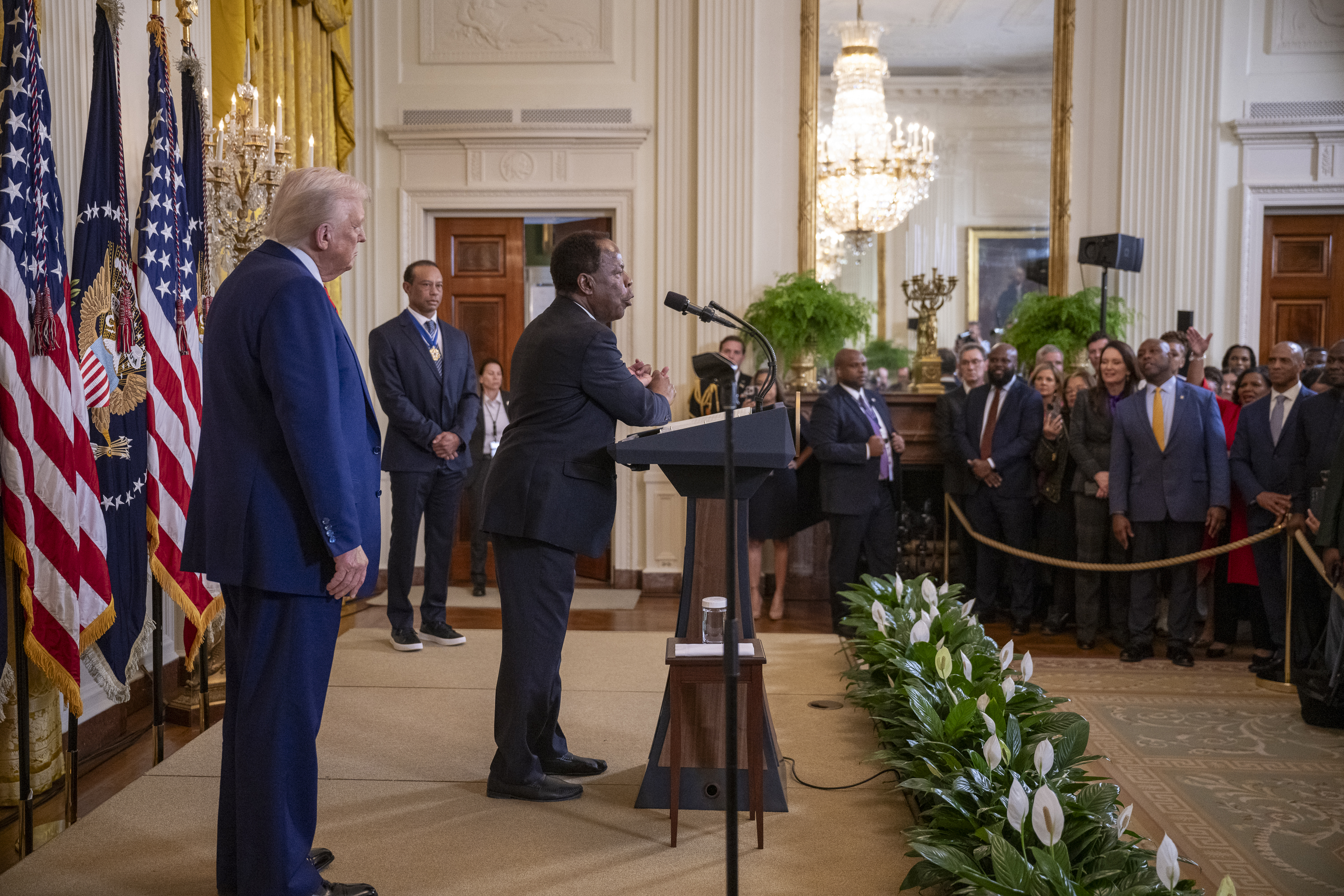
Terrell, Trump and Tiger Woods at White House reception honoring Black History Month, February 20, 2025

In 2001, Terrell unsuccessfully ran for Congress. In 2003, Terrell ran for the seat of District 10 on the Los Angeles City Council and came in fifth place among seven candidates.

On January 21, 2025, Terrell was nominated as Senior Counsel to the Assistant Attorney General for the Civil Rights Division. He has announced in a statement he intended to pursue legal action against antisemitism in universities. In March 2025, the head of the Jewish Council for Public Affairs condemned Terrell for sharing content by the former head of white supremacist group Identity Evropa mocking Jewish senator Chuck Schumer, saying that Trump had revoked his "Jew card."

Terrell appeared at the top of The Algemeiner's "Top 100 People Positively Influencing Jewish Life, 2025" list for his work at the Department of Justice's Task Force to Combat Antisemitism, where he advocated for treating campus antisemitism as a civil rights violation that requires federal oversight and accountability for universities.

=== Notable cases ===
In 1995, Terrell represented Kumasi Simmons, a former football player from Centennial High School in Compton expelled for hitting a referee. Simmons accused the referee of using racial epithets. Terrell accused the Beverly Hills Police Department of intimidating witnesses who could back up Simmons's claim.

In 1999, Terrell called on the Los Angeles police commission to hear witnesses who claimed that a homeless woman, Margaret Laverne Mitchell, was running when police officers shot her.

In 2012, Terrell called for an investigation of misconduct by trainees of the Los Angeles County Sheriff's Department.

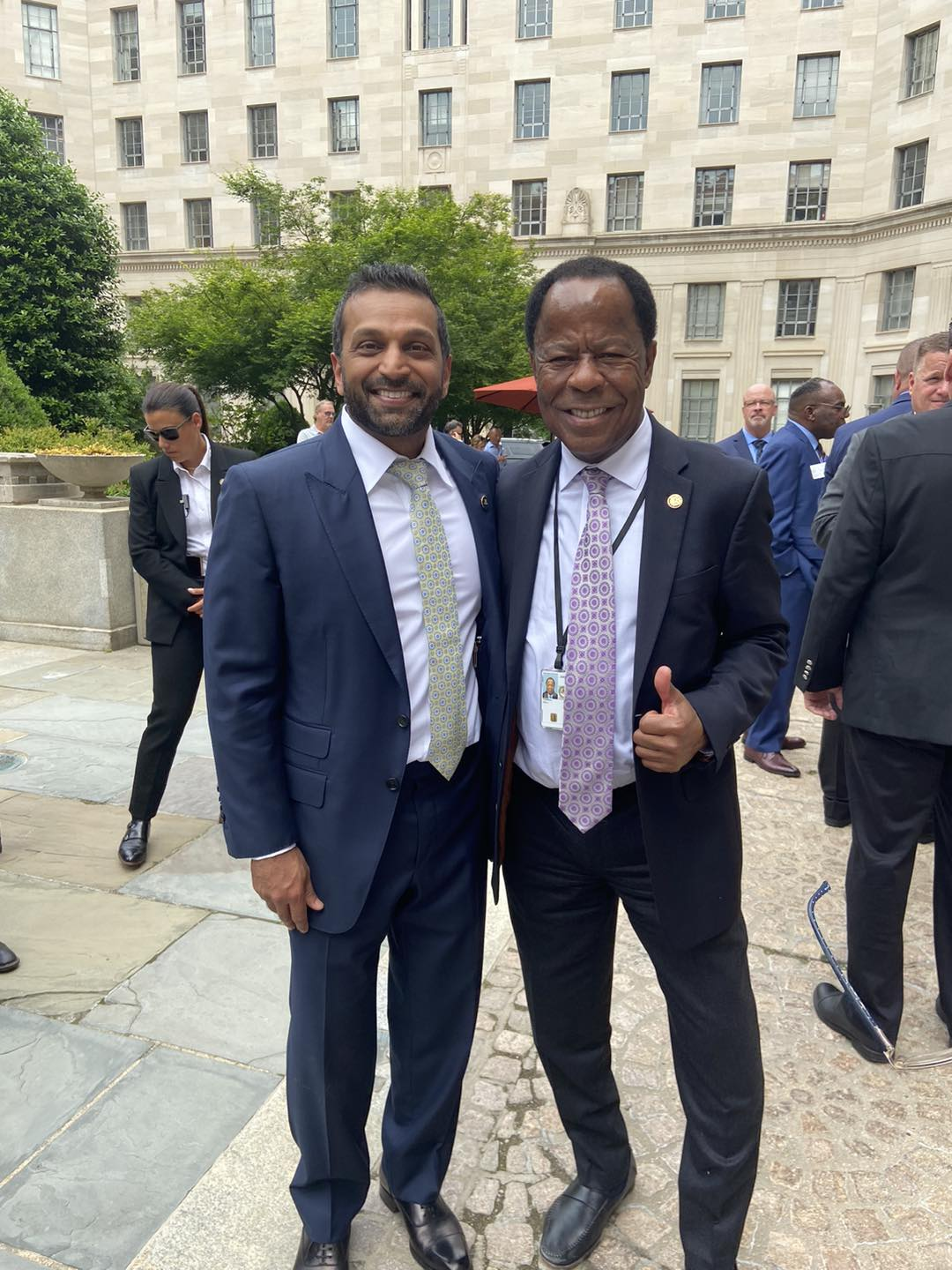
Terrell with FBI Director Kash Patel, May 14, 2025

In February 2025, Terrell announced he would be investigating Columbia University, Harvard University, George Washington University, Johns Hopkins University, New York University, Northwestern University, Berkeley University, the University of California, the University of Minnesota, and the University of Southern California as part of a broader DOJ investigation against antisemitism on college campuses.

In May 2025, Terrell drew media attention after suggesting that former First Lady Jill Biden should face criminal charges for elder abuse. He argued that she was aware of President Joe Biden’s health issues yet remained silent during his reelection campaign. Terrell reiterated his stance in a series of posts on X, including one that read, "Elder Abuse! Criminal Charges??"

== Controversy ==
While working as an attorney, Terrell was twice sued for legal malpractice for accepting settlements without a client's permission.

Between 2004 and 2015, 11 liens were filed against Terrell by the Internal Revenue Service, amounting to almost $400,000 in unpaid taxes.

Between 2006 and 2014, more than a dozen vendors that had provided services for Terrell's law firm sued him for unpaid bills totaling over $170,000.

In 2017, US District Judge Paul Maloney wrote that Terrell had provided "abysmal advice" to his client Edmond Logan, who was sentenced to 35 years in prison after Terrell advised him to reject a plea bargain that would have limited Logan's prison time to 10 years. In 2018, the 6th Circuit Court of Appeals wrote that Terrell had provided "woeful representation" to Logan and that Terrell's conduct in the case reflected "poorly on the profession."

In October 2026, Terrell was accused of misconduct towards interns.

== Bibliography ==
- Terrell, Leo James (1998). Your Rights at the Workplace: The Things Your Boss Won't Tell You. Los Angeles, California: Leo Terrell Enterprises. ISBN 0966582802.
