= Claire Shipman =

American television journalist (born 1962)

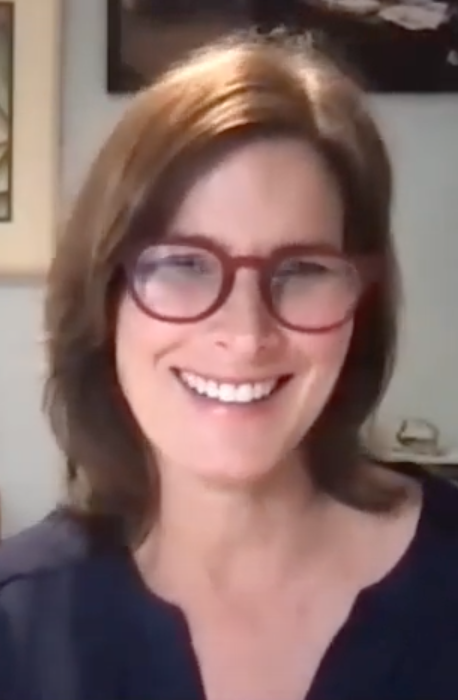
- Shipman in 2021

President of Columbia University
- Acting
- In office March 28, 2025 – June 30, 2026
- Preceded by: Katrina Armstrong (acting)
- Succeeded by: Jennifer Mnookin

Personal details
- Born: October 4, 1962 (age 64) Washington, D.C., U.S.
- Spouses: Steve Hurst (m. 1991; div. 1996); Jay Carney (m. 1998; div. 2025)
- Domestic partner: Kati Jo Spisak (2025–present)
- Children: 2
- Education: Columbia University (BA, MIA)
- Awards: Emmy Award (1990); Peabody Award (1991); Medal "Defender of a Free Russia" (1993)
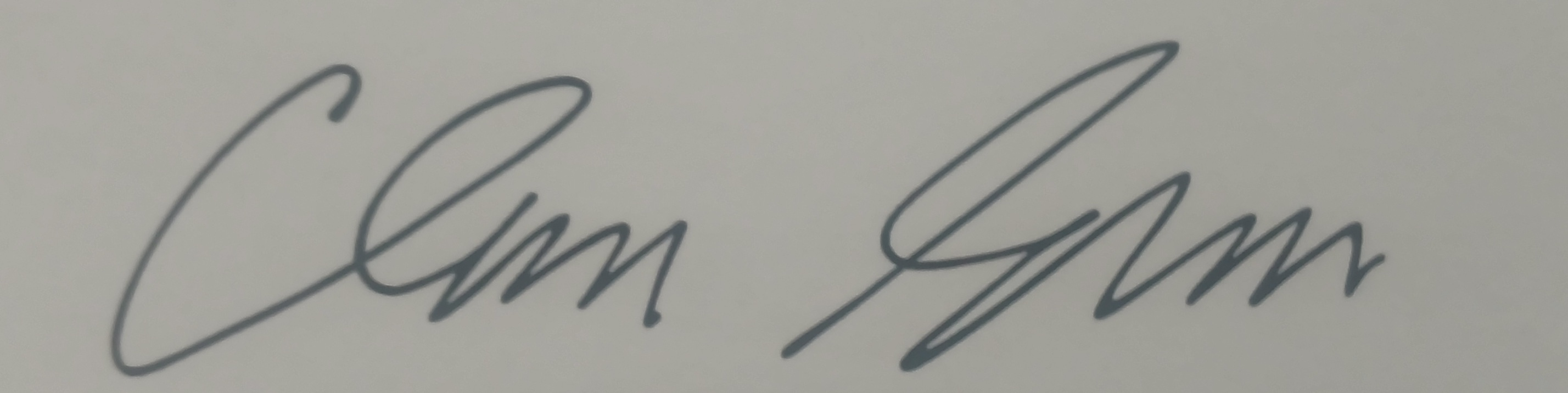
- Signature

Claire Shipman (born October 4, 1962) is an American television journalist and the former senior national correspondent for ABC's Good Morning America. Shipman was the acting president of Columbia University from late March 2025 through June 2026, leading the university through a 15-month period marked by protests against the Gaza war, the university's $221 million settlement with the Trump administration, and the first review of the University Senate. Before becoming acting president of Columbia, she was a co-chair of the university's board of trustees.

== Early life and education ==
Shipman was born in Washington, D.C., and is the daughter of Christie (Armstrong) and Morgan Enlow Shipman, a law professor at Ohio State University. She was raised in Columbus, Ohio.

In 1980, Shipman graduated from Worthington High School in Worthington, Ohio. She is a 1986 graduate of Columbia College of Columbia University where she received a degree in Russian studies. In 1994, she earned a Master of International Affairs from Columbia's School of International and Public Affairs.

== Career ==
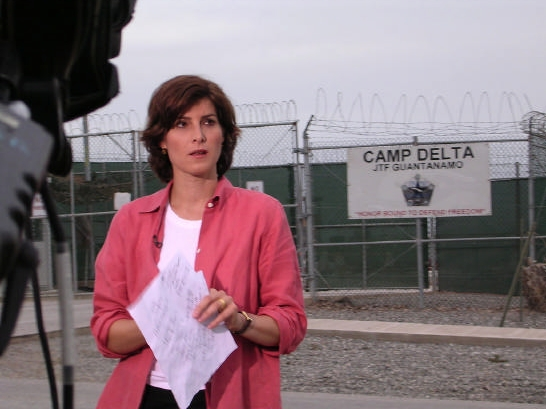
Shipman outside the Guantanamo Bay detention camp in 2003

=== Journalism ===
Shipman began her career in journalism at CNN as an intern covering the White House and international events. In 1990, she received an Alfred I. duPont–Columbia University Award and an Emmy for her reporting on the Tiananmen Square protests.

She spent five years at CNN's Moscow bureau covering the August 1991 Soviet coup attempt and the subsequent dissolution of the Soviet Union. Shipman received a Peabody Award in 1991 as part of the CNN team that covered the failed coup and in 1993, she earned the medal "Defender of a Free Russia" from Russian president Boris Yeltsin for her reporting of the event.

She worked at NBC from 1997 to 2001 and covered the White House during the Clinton administration. Shipman joined ABC News in 2001, reporting on politics, international affairs and social issues.

Shipman has stated that Jay Carney, her husband and White House Press Secretary when Osama bin Laden was killed, gave her no indication that the secret operation was underway in Pakistan.

Along with co-author Katty Kay, a BBC journalist, Shipman has written three New York Times bestselling books: Womenomics (2009), The Confidence Code: The Science and Art of Self-Assurance—What Women Should Know (2014), and The Confidence Code for Girls (2018).

In 2018, she attended the American Israel Public Affairs Committee (AIPAC) conference and conducted interviews on stage with US politicians Marco Rubio, Chris Coons, Tom Cotton, and Grace Meng.

=== Columbia University ===
==== Trustee ====
Shipman joined the board of trustees of Columbia University in 2013 and became a co-chair in 2023. Her tenure as co-chair of the board included the protests at Columbia during the Israel-Hamas war.

Her tenure's span included the 2024 pro-Palestinian campus occupations during which the NYPD entered the campus and arrested students for protesting to pressure Columbia to divest "all finances, including the endowment, from corporations that profit from Israeli apartheid" and for government officials to call for an immediate ceasefire Israel-Hamas war.

==== Acting president ====
On March 28, 2025, Shipman, then serving as co-chair of Columbia's board of trustees, was made acting president of the university amid turmoil from protests in solidarity with Palestine and crackdowns from the Trump administration. She took over for interim president Katrina Armstrong, MD who stepped down suddenly after a call with faculty in which she downplayed Columbia's commitment to its concessions to the Trump administration.

===== Review of the University Senate =====
Two weeks after delivering her first address as acting president in her first meeting with the University Senate on April 4, 2025, Shipman announced that the University Senate—a policymaking body composed of faculty members and students established for shared governance after the 1968 Columbia University protests—would be subject to review. While Shipman cited concerns regarding community-wide representation within the Senate, the review came under media criticism for her vague language, with The New York Times describing the move as an "effort to potentially diminish the university senate’s authority". The report was released in April 2026 and called "on the senate to reform its structure and communication with the University administration and the board of trustees." It also set up three task forces to carry out the reforms.

===== Butler Library protests and public reaction =====
After pro-Palestinian protesters occupied the main reading room at Butler Library on May 7, 2025, naming it the "Basel Al-Araj Popular University" for Bassel al-Araj, Shipman authorized the presence of the NYPD, and police in riot gear arrested 78 student protesters. It was the fourth mass arrest at Columbia University in 18 months and the largest since April 2024 when the NYPD arrested 109 in its sweep of "Hind's Hall" and the second Gaza Solidarity Encampment. The policing and suppression of the protest has been described as forceful and aggressive, with two individuals brought out in a stretcher, one of them wearing a kuffiyeh draped over their face. The university Emergency Medical Service was denied entry by Public Safety to treat injured protestors.After heavy media criticism of police activity on campus, Shipman praised the NYPD and Public Safety for what she called their "professionalism".

On May 20, 2025, during her speech at the Columbia College class day ceremony, Shipman was greeted with jeers and boos, as well as chants of "free Mahmoud" in reference to Mahmoud Khalil, a graduate held in detention since U.S. Immigration and Customs Enforcement (ICE) agents removed him from his Columbia residence on March 8. At the university's main commencement ceremony the following day, there were also chants of "free Palestine" from the crowd of graduates during her speech.

In July 2025, the House Committee on Education and the Workforce released text messages sent by Shipman in 2023-2024 while she was co-chair of Columbia's board of trustees. The messages included discussions about establishing a Task Force on Antisemitism, adding an Arab or Middle Eastern trustee, and removing a Jewish trustee. Shipman apologized for the texts calling for the removal of the Jewish trustee, stating that the messages were written during a stressful period and did not reflect her views.

===== Columbia's settlement with the Trump administration =====
On July 23, 2025, the board of trustees of Columbia University formalized a settlement with the Trump administration in which Columbia would pay the federal government US$221 million and accept various demands from the Trump administration, including adopting the IHRA definition of antisemitism; punishing student demonstrators with expulsions, degree revocations, and multi-year suspensions; and reviewing the university's Middle East studies programs. Following the Gaza Solidarity Encampment and broader protests amid the Gaza genocide, the university became a focus of Donald Trump, whose administration, citing what it called widespread antisemitism at Columbia, cut $400 million in funding to the university, detained and attempted to deport Palestinian student-activists Mahmoud Khalil and Mohsen Mahdawi, and investigated Columbia for Title VI violations. Critics of the settlement called the government's actions "extortion" and Columbia's actions "capitulation" and held that it prejudiced the university's institutional independence and restricted academic freedom within it.

Shipman described the $220 million settlement to restore federal funding as "in line with our values." Addressing public response to the settlement in the hours after it was announced, she said "I think it’s easy to cast things in really binary terms, and capitulation versus fighting," and added: "I think that we have so many important things at stake in this institution right now, and what we’ve been trying to do, the group of us who’s been looking at all of it and talking to the government, talking with people across the University and academic leadership, is slow down and really work as deliberately as we possibly could."

In the 2026 commencement ceremonies, Shipman spoke in favor of "generosity of spirit" and privileging the "consequential over the petty" and was booed again. Shipman did not attend any of the class day ceremonies.

== Personal life ==
She was married to former CNN Moscow bureau chief Steve Hurst from 1991 to 1996. She was then married to former White House Press Secretary Jay Carney, with whom she has a son and daughter. As of 2025, they were recently divorced.

In September 2025, Shipman was engaged to former pro soccer player Kati Jo Spisak.
