= Katrina Armstrong =

American internist and academic

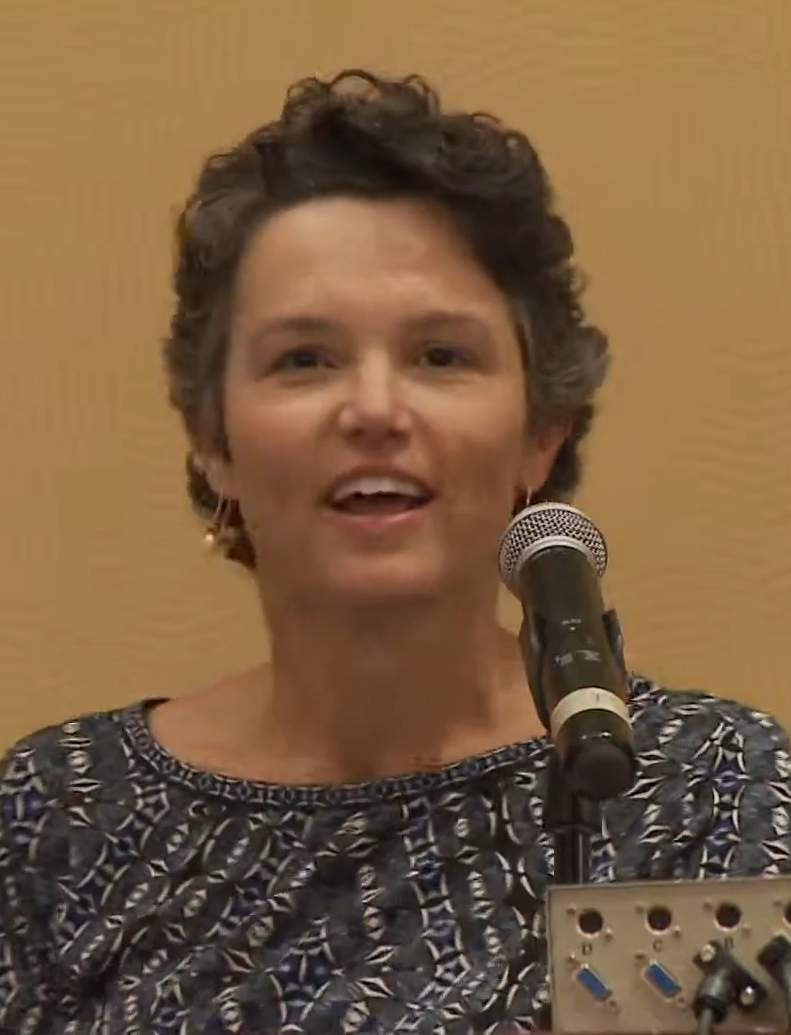
- Armstrong in 2015

President of Columbia University
- Acting; August 14, 2024 – March 28, 2025
- Preceded by: Minouche Shafik
- Succeeded by: Claire Shipman (acting)

Personal details
- Born: New Haven, Connecticut, U.S.
- Spouse: Thomas Randall
- Education: Yale University (BA); Johns Hopkins University (MD); University of Pennsylvania (MS)

Katrina Alison Armstrong is an American physician; the CEO of Columbia University Irving Medical Center and the dean of the Faculties of Health Sciences at Columbia University. She was interim president of Columbia University from August 2024 to March 2025.

Armstrong is the first woman to lead Columbia's medical school and medical center. She was the first woman to hold the position of Physician-in-Chief at Massachusetts General Hospital and was elected to the National Academy of Medicine in 2013 and the American Academy of Arts and Sciences in 2020. On August 14, 2024, Armstrong became Columbia University's interim president, following the resignation of Minouche Shafik. On March 7, 2025, Armstrong expressed her commitment to working with the government of Donald Trump. On March 28, Armstrong was succeeded as interim president by Claire Shipman, Co-Chair of Columbia University's board of trustees.

== Early life and education ==
Armstrong was born in New Haven, Connecticut. She was raised in Buffalo, New York, and Tuscaloosa, Alabama, and attended Indian Springs School in Pelham, Alabama. She graduated from Yale University with her Bachelor of Arts degree in architecture in 1986, earned her M.D. from Johns Hopkins University in 1991, and a Master of Science in clinical epidemiology from the University of Pennsylvania in 1998. She completed her residency training in internal medicine at Johns Hopkins.

== Career ==
=== University of Pennsylvania ===
Armstrong joined the Division of General Internal Medicine at the Perelman School of Medicine at the University of Pennsylvania (UPenn) in 1996 as a Physician-Scientist Fellow before accepting a professorship position in 1998 following her master's degree. At the turn of the century, she received a UPenn University Research Foundation Award to fund her projects Identifying and Reaching Populations at Risk: The Paradox of Cancer Control and Housestaff Depression and Career Choices. As an assistant professor of medicine and epidemiology in the Division of General Internal Medicine at UPenn, Armstrong co-developed and directed the first and second-year medical course "Clinical Decision Making." In recognition of her teaching, she received the 2003 Leonard Berwick Award, awarded to "a member of the medical faculty who in his or her teaching most effectively fuses basic science and clinical medicine."

On September 7, 2004, Armstrong was appointed the Director of Research at the Leonard Davis Institute of Health Economics. In this role, she also was director of UPenn's FOCUS on Health & Leadership Program Research Programs, which received the 2004 Association of American Medical Colleges Women in Medicine Leadership Development Award. While continuing her research into cancer control, genetic testing for cancer susceptibility, and racial disparities in cancer outcomes, she earned the Samuel Martin Health Evaluation Sciences Research Award for "her research program that seeks to elucidate the complex relationships among the social environment, health care use, and health outcomes." In 2006, Armstrong was elected to the American Society for Clinical Investigation for her records of scholarly achievement in biomedical research.

As an associate professor of Medicine, Obstetrics and Gynecology, and Biostatistics and Epidemiology, Armstrong was appointed Chief of the Division of General Internal Medicine at the Penn School of Medicine in 2008. In this role, she co-led a longitudinal observational study with Robert Hornik to explore whether patient-clinician information exchange is associated with differences in cancer patient health behaviors, health care utilization and health outcomes. By 2011, Armstrong and Mitchell Schnall received a five-year, $7.5 million grant from the National Cancer Institute to create the Penn Center for Innovation in Personalized Breast Cancer Screening.

In 2017, Armstrong received UPenn's Pioneer Award for her "achievements and rise to some of the highest health care posts in government and academic medicine."

=== Harvard and MGH ===
In 2013, Armstrong was appointed chair of medicine and physician-in-chief at Massachusetts General Hospital (MGH), becoming the first woman to hold the position. The day she began her tenure at MGH, the Boston Marathon bombing occurred and she said it enabled her to "see MGH come together in an extraordinary way to respond to the need of the community." In the same year, she was also elected to the National Academy of Medicine.

=== Columbia University Irving Medical Center ===
On 1 March 2022, Armstrong became the 25th Dean of Vagelos College of Physicians and Surgeons, and first woman to lead Columbia's medical school and medical center. She therefore assumed the title:

- Dean of the Faculties of Health Sciences and the Vagelos College of Physicians and Surgeons.
- chief executive officer of Columbia University Irving Medical Center
- Executive Vice President for Health and Biomedical Sciences for Columbia University
- Harold & Margaret Hatch Professor in the Faculty of Medicine

On 1 June 2026 Armstrong announced she is stepping down from Dean of VP&S to launch the Vagelos Institute for Basic Biomedical Research. She was succeeded by Internum Dean, James M McKiernan, MD, the John Lattimer Professor of Urology and former Chair of Urology and concurrently Urologist-in-Chief at NewYork-Presbyterian / CUMC.

=== Interim president of Columbia ===
On August 14, 2024, Armstrong became Columbia University's interim president, immediately after President Minouche Shafik resigned following criticism for the university's response to the Gaza Solidarity Encampment and broader protest movement on campus, including the decision to summon the New York Police Department to break up protests and arrest hundreds of demonstrators.

In September 2024, Armstrong apologized to pro-Palestinian students and others "hurt" by mass arrests conducted by the NYPD at Columbia's behest earlier in the year. That same month, she expressed her desire to see Columbia's campus reopened to the public, which had been mostly closed since the Gaza war. As of her March 2025 resignation, however, Columbia's campus continued to remain closed to the public without a scheduled appointment.

On March 28, 2025, the Columbia University Board of Trustees announced that Katrina Armstrong was replaced as interim president by journalist Claire Shipman. Armstrong returned to lead the University’s Irving Medical Center.

== Awards and honors ==
- Outstanding Junior Investigator of the Year Award from the Society of General Internal Medicine (2003)
- Alice Hersh Award from AcademyHealth (2005)
- Member of the American Society for Clinical Investigation (2006)
- Outstanding Investigator Award from the American Federation for Medical Research (2009)
- Member of the National Academy of Medicine (2013)
- Member of the American Academy of Arts and Sciences (April 2020)

== Personal life ==
While attending Johns Hopkins University in the Osler residency program, she met her future husband Tom Randall, a gynecologic oncologist, and married him upon graduation. Armstrong and Randall have three children together.
