= 2019 UN Climate Action Summit =

UN Climate Action Summit in 2019

- Date: 21–23 September 2019
- Location: New York City, New York, U.S.
- Organized by: United Nations
- Participants: UN member countries

The 2019 UN Climate Action Summit was held at the headquarters of the United Nations in New York City on 23 September 2019. The UN 2019 Climate Summit convened on the theme, "Climate Action Summit 2019: A Race We Can Win. A Race We Must Win." The goal of the summit was to further climate action to reduce greenhouse gas emissions to prevent the mean global temperature from rising by more than 1.5 °C (2.7 °F) above preindustrial levels. Sixty countries were expected to "announce steps to reduce emissions and support populations most vulnerable to the climate crisis" including France, a number of other European countries, small island countries and India. To increase pressure on political and economic actors to achieve the aims of the summit, a global climate strike was held around the world on 20 September with over four million participants.

== Results ==
The results of the summit were significant though it is believed that they were not enough to limit the rise of global temperature to less than 1.5 degrees as needed to address the climate crisis. China did not increase its Paris Agreement commitments, India did not pledge to reduce its use of coal, and the U.S. did not even speak at the conference. However, important commitments were made in many areas and the organizers declared that: "Summit initiatives were designed to ensure the actions undertaken would be fair for all, supporting jobs and clear air for better health, and protect the most vulnerable, as well as new initiatives on adaptation, agriculture and early warning systems that will protect 500 million additional people against the impacts of climate change."

On the web, a page called "Announcements" contained press releases about the results of the summit. Press releases with information about the issue were also published in September 2019, in the section "Press Materials". The information is also stored in the UN portal of climate action "NAZCA".

=== Governmental commitments ===
- Sixty-five countries and the European Union pledged to cut greenhouse gas emissions to zero by the year 2050. The number of countries making this pledge reached 77.
- Many small countries, including Small Island Developing States and Least Developed Countries were among the states who made the biggest steps. The Small Island Developing States collectively increased their climate targets by 2020, achieve 100% of energy from renewables sources by 2030, and achieve a zero carbon economy by 2050, provided they are helped by the international community.
- France pledged to not enter into trade deals with countries that have policies contrary to the Paris Agreement.
- Greece and Hungary pledged to close their coal-fired power plants by 2028 and 2030, respectively.
- The Global Campaign for Nature begun to function. The target of the campaign is protect 30% of the earth surface by the year 2030. Guatemala and Costa Rica are leading this initiative.
- The Climate Ambition Alliance was created. The president of the alliance is the president of Chile, Sebastián Piñera. The alliance want to unite the countries that want to increase their commitments by the year 2020. Fifty-nine countries said that they will do so. Eleven countries have begun the process of boosting their commitments.
- The Powering Past Coal Alliance became much bigger: after the summit, 32 countries, 25 states and regions, and 34 corporations are members of the alliance that wants to stop building coal power plants by the year 2020 and make transition to renewable energy.
- The organization "High Level Panel for a Sustainable Ocean Economy" was created. It include 14 countries, covering a large part of the world coasts and fisheries. It seeks to protect the oceans and create marine protected areas.
- The European Union promised to give a quarter of its budget to climate action in the next year.
- China announced, that it will go through "high quality growth and low-carbon development". China created a partnership with a target of removing 12 billion tons from the annual global Greenhouse gas emission by natural solutions.
- India promised to bring their renewable energy capacity to 175 gigawatts by the 2022 and to 450 gigawatts after.
- Eighty countries joined the International Solar Alliance.
- The Russian Federation pledged to ratify the Paris Agreement, increasing the number of signatories to 187. The agreement was ratified by Russia's Prime Minister, Dmitry Medvedev. Russia is the fourth largest emitter of greenhouse gases (GHG). The targets for Russia in the agreement are reducing the emissions by 30% from the level of 1990 by the year 2030. The emissions of Russia in 2017 were already 32% lower than in 1990, so in fact the pledge does not decrease them. But as Russia has a growing economy relying primarily on fossil fuels, this will have some effects. Russian forests also play a role in removing CO_{2} from the atmosphere.
- Pakistan pledged to plant more than 10 billion trees in the years 2019–2024.
- The "Nature-Based Solutions Coalition", composed of more than 40 countries, 150 organizations, 50 private companies, and 12 foundations, led by China and New Zealand, made important commitments:
- The Central African Forest Initiative pledged to save the forest in central Africa, the second largest tropical forest on Earth, preventing the release to the atmosphere of 70 gigatons of CO_{2}, and protecting the livelihoods of 60 million people.
- Pakistan pledged to restore parts of its degraded ecosystems: 30% of forests, 5% of croplands, 6% of grasslands and 10% of wetlands, what will make it land degradation neutral by 2030.
- El Salvador committed to protect 10 million hectares of forest and change the food sector, so that GHG emissions from it will be 40% lower by 2030.

=== Local commitments ===
Ten regions pledged reduce greenhouse gas emissions to zero by the year 2050.

=== Cities commitments ===
- One hundred and two cities pledged reduce greenhouse gas emission to zero by 2050.
- The initiative "Action Toward Climate Friendly Transport" (ACT) was created. It wants to plan cities in a way that will minimize the need for transport, advancing non-motorized transport and decreasing emissions. Over 100 organizations are members of this group including governments, cities, and companies.
- The initiative "Zero Carbon Building For All" pledged that by the year 2030 all new buildings will be "zero carbon". By the year 2050 all existing building will be so. Over 100 organizations are members of this group including governments, cities, and companies.

=== Private sector commitments ===
- Eighty-seven companies and 15 investors pledged to reach zero carbon economy by the year 2050.
- One-third of the global banking sector—130 banks—said that they will work to achieve the Paris Agreement goals.
- Companies with a capitalisation of US$2.3 trillion united in an organization named "UN Global Compact" to commit to manage their businesses to achieve climate targets.
- An organization of investors, the "Asset Owner Alliance", with US$2 trillion in capital, said that by 2050 it will move to carbon-free investments.
- A platform to advance financial tools that can protect the oceans was created by the head of Axa. It is called ORRAA.

=== What was not achieved ===
The commitments of the summit are not enough to limit the rise of global temperature to less than 1.5 degrees, as needed to address the climate crisis. António Guterres, the Secretary General of the UN, said at the close of the summit: "Much more is needed to reach carbon neutrality by 2050 and keep temperature rise to 1.5 degrees by the end of the century." Andrew Steer, the president of the World Resources Institute, said that: "most of the major economies fell woefully short" of increasing their targets. Those who promise to achieve carbon neutrality by 2050 are unsure how to do it.

Some points are especially troubling:

- China did not increase its Paris Agreement commitments
- India did not pledge to reduce its use of coal
- The U.S. did not speak at the conference
- A prohibition of new coal plants by the year 2020 was not achieved. They are "a looming threat to us all" according to the UN Secretary-General.

=== Checking what will be done ===
All the announcements will be written in the Global Climate Action Portal called NAZCA. The portal will check the fulfilling of the pledges.

The Climate Home News published a non exhaustive list of the commitments and said it will check the fulfillment.

== Coalition for Disaster Resilient Infrastructure (CDRI) ==
Prime Minister of India, Narendra Modi, launched the Coalition for Disaster-Resilient Infrastructure (CDRI) on 25 September 2019. The fledgling partnership has a secretariat in Delhi, supported by the UN Office for Disaster Risk Reduction (UNDRR), to enable knowledge exchange, technical support and capacity building.

== Greta Thunberg attendance ==
In mid-August 2019, climate activist Greta Thunberg sailed from Plymouth to the United States to participate in the UN Climate Action Summit. Speaking on 23 September, Thunberg opened her statement to the General Assembly with an impassioned and emotional commentary which was widely covered by the media.

"This is all wrong. I shouldn't be up here. I should be back in school on the other side of the ocean. Yet you all come to us young people for hope? How dare you! You have stolen my dreams and my childhood with your empty words. And yet I'm one of the lucky ones. People are suffering. People are dying. Entire ecosystems are collapsing. We are in the beginning of a mass extinction. And all you can talk about is money and fairytales of eternal economic growth. How dare you!"

At her appearance, Thunberg announced that she and 15 other children including Alexandria Villaseñor, Catarina Lorenzo, and Carl Smith were filing a lawsuit against five nations that are not on track to meet the emission reduction targets they committed to in their Paris Agreement pledges: Argentina, Brazil, France, Germany, and Turkey. The lawsuit is challenging the nations under the UN's Convention on the Rights of the Child (specifically the right to life, health, and peace). If the complaint is successful, the countries will be asked to respond, but any suggestions are not legally binding.

Following her appearance, US President Donald Trump, who had attended the meeting for 10 minutes and then left, tweeted a video of her opening remarks in which she is obviously emotionally distressed and commented, "She seems like a very happy young girl looking forward to a bright and wonderful future. So nice to see!"

== See also ==
- September 2019 climate strikes
