= RRI =

RRI may refer to:

== Radio ==
- Radio Republik Indonesia, the Indonesian public radio network
  - RRI Programa 3
  - Voice of Indonesia, also known as RRI Voice of Indonesia
- Radio Romania International
  - RRI 1
  - RRI 2

== Other uses ==
- Raman Research Institute, Bangalore, India
- RepRisk Index, a proprietary risk metric
- Responsible Research and Innovation, notion used by the European Union
- Rights and Resources Initiative, an international coalition of organizations promoting land tenure reform for poor communities around the world
- RRI Energy, former name of GenOn Energy
- Road Routing Information within Integrated Transport Network data provided by Ordnance Survey
- RRI Rhein Ruhr International, Consulting Engineers
