= Arun Agrawal =

Indian political scientist

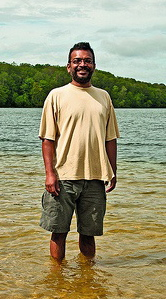
- Born: September 20, 1962 (age 64); Forbesganj, Bihar, India
- Spouse: Rebecca Hardin
- Children: Naina Agrawal-Hardin

Academic background
- Education: University of Delhi (BA); Indian Institute of Management Ahmedabad (MBA); Duke University (MA, PhD)

Academic work
- Discipline: Political scientist
- Institutions: University of Michigan; University of Notre Dame

External videos
- “The Evolution of the Commons, Arun Agrawal, February 5, 2021.

Arun Agrawal (born September 20, 1962) is a political scientist and the Pulte Family Professor of Development Policy in the Keough School of Global Affairs at the University of Notre Dame. Agrawal is the coordinator for the International Forestry Resources and Institutions network and does research in Africa and South Asia.

Agrawal serves on the editorial board of the Proceedings of the National Academy of Sciences. He was the editor-in-chief of the scholarly journal World Development from 2013-2021. In 2026 he became a co-editor of the Annual Review of Environment and Resources.

Agrawal was a Guggenheim Fellow in 2011 and was elected to the National Academy of Sciences in 2018.

== Education ==
Arun Agrawal was born in Forbesganj, Bihar, India, where he grew up in a middle-class family. Eventually he moved to Patna to live with an aunt, so that he could attend a better school.

Agrawal received his BA in History from the University of Delhi in 1983. He received an MBA in Development Administration and Public Policy from the Indian Institute of Management Ahmedabad in 1985. Moving to the United States, he received his Ph.D. in political science from Duke University in 1992. His Ph.D. work involved following Indian shepherds in the Himalayas to better understand how those communities managed commonly held resources.

== Career ==
Agrawal has taught at the University of Florida (1993-1996), Yale University (1997-2002) and McGill University (2002-2003). From 2003 to 2024, he taught at the University of Michigan in Ann Arbor, where he worked on issues of environmental politics, governance, and sustainable development. As of January 2025, Agrawal is the inaugural director of the Just Transformations to Sustainability Initiative at the University of Notre Dame.

In 2022, Agrawal was chosen to be a co-chair of the Transformative Change Assessment for the Intergovernmental Platform on Biodiversity and Ecosystem Services (IPBES). The Transformative Change Assessment will address "the underlying causes of biodiversity loss, the determinants of transformative change, and options for achieving the 2050 vision for biodiversity".

== Publications ==
Agrawal's work has been published in journals such as Science, Conservation Biology, World Development, and PNAS. In a publication in Nature, Agrawal explores the positive side of disaster in his case study of a 1998 hurricane in Honduras. According to Agrawal, natural disasters like this set the stage for alternative social trajectories.

=== Books ===
Agrawal's best known book is Environmentality: Technologies of Government and the Making of Subjects, published in 2005.

Previously published books included Greener Pastures: Politics, Markets, and Community Among a Migrant Pastoral People, (1999) and Decentralization in Nepal: A Comparative Analysis (1998).

==== Reviews ====
- "Arun Agrawal (in Environmentality) provides a most lucid account of the people-government- forest interplay in the 20th century Kumaon Himalayas in this book.... Arun Agrawal addresses these fascinating questions on the basis, not only of archival research, but significantly, on the strength of extensive long-term fieldwork."—The Hindu
- "This book (Environmentality) aims to promote Arun Agrawal's own neologism - "environmentality" ... This book, too, has hidden its worthwhile arguments in thickets of verbal profusion, which make it hard to see the teak for the forest."--The Times Higher Education

=== Books edited ===
- 2001: Agrarian Environments: Resources, Representations and Rule in India. Duke University Press, Durham, ISBN 0-8223-2555-1
- 2001: Social Nature: Resources, Representations and Rule in India. Oxford University Press, New Delhi, ISBN 0-19-565460-9
- 2001: Communities and the Environment: Ethnicity, Gender, and the State in Community-Based Conservation. Rutgers University Press, Piscataway, ISBN 0-8135-2914-X
- 2003: Regional Modernities: The Cultural Politics of Development in India. Stanford University Press, Palo Alto, ISBN 0-8047-4415-7

== See also ==
- Central African Forest Initiative
- International Forestry Resources and Institutions
