= Rhine-Ruhr (disambiguation) =

Rhine-Ruhr (German: Metropolregion Rhein-Ruhr, also called Rhein-Ruhr-Region or simply Rhein-Ruhr) usually refers to the Rhine-Ruhr Metropolitan Region in Western Germany. It may also refer to:

- the Rhein-Ruhr-Marathon
- the Verkehrsverbund Rhein-Ruhr
- the Rhein-Ruhr S-Bahn
- the RheinRuhrZentrum - RRZ
- RRI Rhein Ruhr International GmbH, a German engineering firm
- RR Rhine Ruhr (PTY) Ltd, an Australian engineering firm
