= Diana Ürge-Vorsatz =

Environmental scientist (b. 1968)

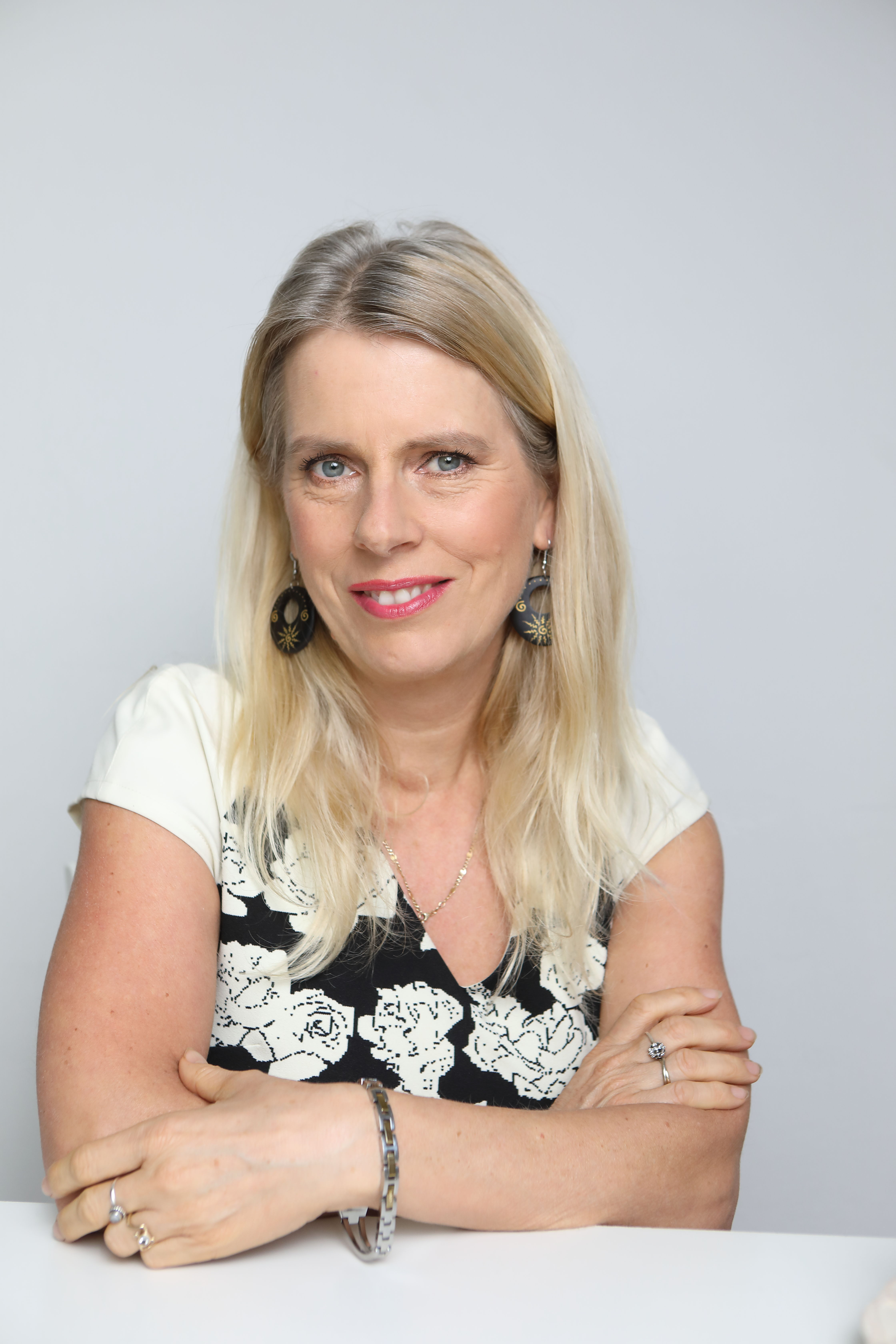
- Ürge-Vorsatz in 2021
- Born: 1968 (age 57–58); Berlin
- Education: Eötvös Loránd University; University of California, Los Angeles; University of California, Berkeley
- Scientific career
- Fields: Environmental science
- Workplaces: Central European University

Diana Ürge-Vorsatz is a Hungarian scientist. She is a vice-chair of the Intergovernmental Panel on Climate Change, and professor of Environmental Sciences at Central European University. She was the Director of the Center for Climate Change and Sustainable Energy Policy. She has published widely on environmental and energy studies, primarily climate change mitigation.

Ürge-Vorsatz was a coordinating lead author of both the Fourth and Fifth Assessment Reports (AR4 and AR5) of the Nobel Peace Prize-winning Intergovernmental Panel on Climate Change.

== Early life ==
Diana Ürge-Vorsatz was born in 1968 in Berlin. She grew up in Budapest, where she attended Radnóti Miklós High School. From 1986 to 1992 Ürge-Vorsatz attended Eötvös Loránd University (ELTE) in Budapest, earning a master's degree in physics in 1992 with specialization in both Astrophysics and Environmental Physics. During this time, Ürge-Vorsatz also studied as a visiting student at Brunel University London from 1990 to 1991, where she took graduate courses in environmental pollution science and conducted research in environmental physics. In the summer of 1992, following her Master's graduation, Ürge-Vorsatz attended a post-grad program in Environmental Science at Central European University. She credits her switch in discipline from astrophysics to climate change as coming as an epiphany that occurred during a meeting on an unrelated topic, where she was suddenly struck by a "a strong feeling that she must focus on problems that are happening on Earth."

Ürge-Vorsatz was a Fulbright Scholar within the Energy and Resources Group at the University of California, Los Angeles and Berkeley. She earned her PhD in Environmental Science and Engineering from the University of California in 1996. Her dissertation is titled "Evaluating US Residential and Commercial Electricity Conservation Potentials: an Analysis of the Lighting Sector."

== Career ==
Ürge-Vorsatz became an associate professor at Central European University (CEU) in 2001, and a full Professor in 2007. Ürge-Vorsatz accepted the position of Director for the Center for Climate Change and Sustainable Energy Policy (3CSEP) in 2007.

Ürge-Vorsatz has served on the Scientific Expert Group on Climate Change of the United Nations, and led work on the Global Energy Assessment of buildings. She is the vice chair of the Intergovernmental Panel on Climate Change Working Group III (WG III).

Ürge-Vorsatz was a coordinating lead author of both the Fourth and Fifth Assessment Reports (AR4 and AR5) of the Nobel Peace Prize-winning Intergovernmental Panel on Climate Change. The Nobel Peace Prize was awarded jointly to the Intergovernmental Panel on Climate Change and Al Gore for their efforts to bring climate change information to the public.

Ürge-Vorsatz has been serving as Vice Chair of the Intergovernmental Panel on Climate Change since July 2023. Ürge-Vorsatz serves on the Board of Directors of Annual Reviews. In 2026, Ürge-Vorsatz became a co-editor of the Annual Review of Environment and Resources.

== Personal life ==
In 1984, Ürge-Vorsatz won the Hungarian National Championship in orienteering. She is the mother of seven children.

== Selected publications ==
- Ürge-Vorsatz, Diana; Koeppel, Sonja; Mirasgedis, Sebastian (1 August 2007). "Appraisal of policy instruments for reducing buildings' CO2 emissions". Building Research & Information. 35 (4): 458–477. doi:10.1080/09613210701327384. ISSN 0961-3218. S2CID 109325859.
- Ürge-Vorsatz, Diana; Novikova, Aleksandra (2008). "Potentials and costs of carbon dioxide mitigation in the world's buildings". Energy Policy. 36 (2): 642–661. doi:10.1016/j.enpol.2007.10.009.
- Ürge-Vorsatz, Diana; Tirado Herrero, Sergio (1 October 2012). "Building synergies between climate change mitigation and energy poverty alleviation". Energy Policy. 49: 83–90. doi:10.1016/j.enpol.2011.11.093.
- Ürge-Vorsatz, Diana; Cabeza, Luisa F.; Serrano, Susana; Barreneche, Camila; Petrichenko, Ksenia (2015). "Heating and cooling energy trends and drivers in buildings". Renewable and Sustainable Energy Reviews. 41: 85–98. doi:10.1016/j.rser.2014.08.039. hdl:20.500.14018/12540.
- Ürge-Vorsatz, Diana; Tirado Herrero, Sergio; Dubash, Navroz K.; Lecocq, Franck (2014). "Measuring the co-benefits of climate change mitigation". Annual Review of Environment and Resources. 39: 549–582. doi:10.1146/annurev-environ-031312-125456.
- Seto, K.; Davis, S.; Mitchell, R.; Stokes, Eleanor C.; Unruh, Gregory C.; Ürge-Vorsatz, D. (2016). "Carbon Lock-In: Types, Causes, and Policy Implications". Annual Review of Environment and Resources. 41 (1): 425–452. doi:10.1146/annurev-environ-110615-085934.
- Güneralp, Burak; Zhou, Yuyu; Ürge-Vorsatz, Diana; Gupta, Mukesh; Yu, Sha; Patel, Pralit L.; Fragkias, Michail; Li, Xiaoma; Seto, Karen C. (2017). "Global scenarios of urban density and its impacts on building energy use through 2050". Proceedings of the National Academy of Sciences. 114 (34): 8945–8950. Bibcode:2017PNAS..114.8945G. doi:10.1073/pnas.1606035114. PMC 5576775. PMID 28069957.
- Ürge-Vorsatz, Diana; Rosenzweig, Cynthia; Dawson, Richard J.; Sanchez Rodriguez, Roberto; Bai, Xuemei; Barau, Aliyu Salisu; Seto, Karen C.; Dhakal, Shobhakar (March 2018). "Locking in positive climate responses in cities". Nature Climate Change. 8 (3): 174–177. Bibcode:2018NatCC...8..174U. doi:10.1038/s41558-018-0100-6. ISSN 1758-6798. S2CID 89923163.
- Sanchez Rodriguez, Roberto; Ürge-Vorsatz, Diana; Barau, Aliyu Salisu (March 2018). "Sustainable Development Goals and climate change adaptation in cities". Nature Climate Change. 8 (3): 181–183. Bibcode:2018NatCC...8..181S. doi:10.1038/s41558-018-0098-9. ISSN 1758-6798. S2CID 90254521.
- Cabeza, Luisa F.; Ürge-Vorsatz, Diana (1 January 2020). "The role of buildings in the energy transition in the context of the climate change challenge". Global Transitions. 2: 257–260. doi:10.1016/j.glt.2020.11.004. hdl:10459.1/69890. ISSN 2589-7918. S2CID 229248127.
- Ürge-Vorsatz, Diana; Khosla, Radhika; Bernhardt, Rob; Chan, Yi Chieh; Vérez, David; Hu, Shan; Cabeza, Luisa F. (17 October 2020). "Advances Toward a Net-Zero Global Building Sector". Annual Review of Environment and Resources. 45 (1): 227–269. doi:10.1146/annurev-environ-012420-045843. hdl:10459.1/69710. ISSN 1543-5938. S2CID 225303035.
