= Haven Coleman =

American climate activist (born 2006)

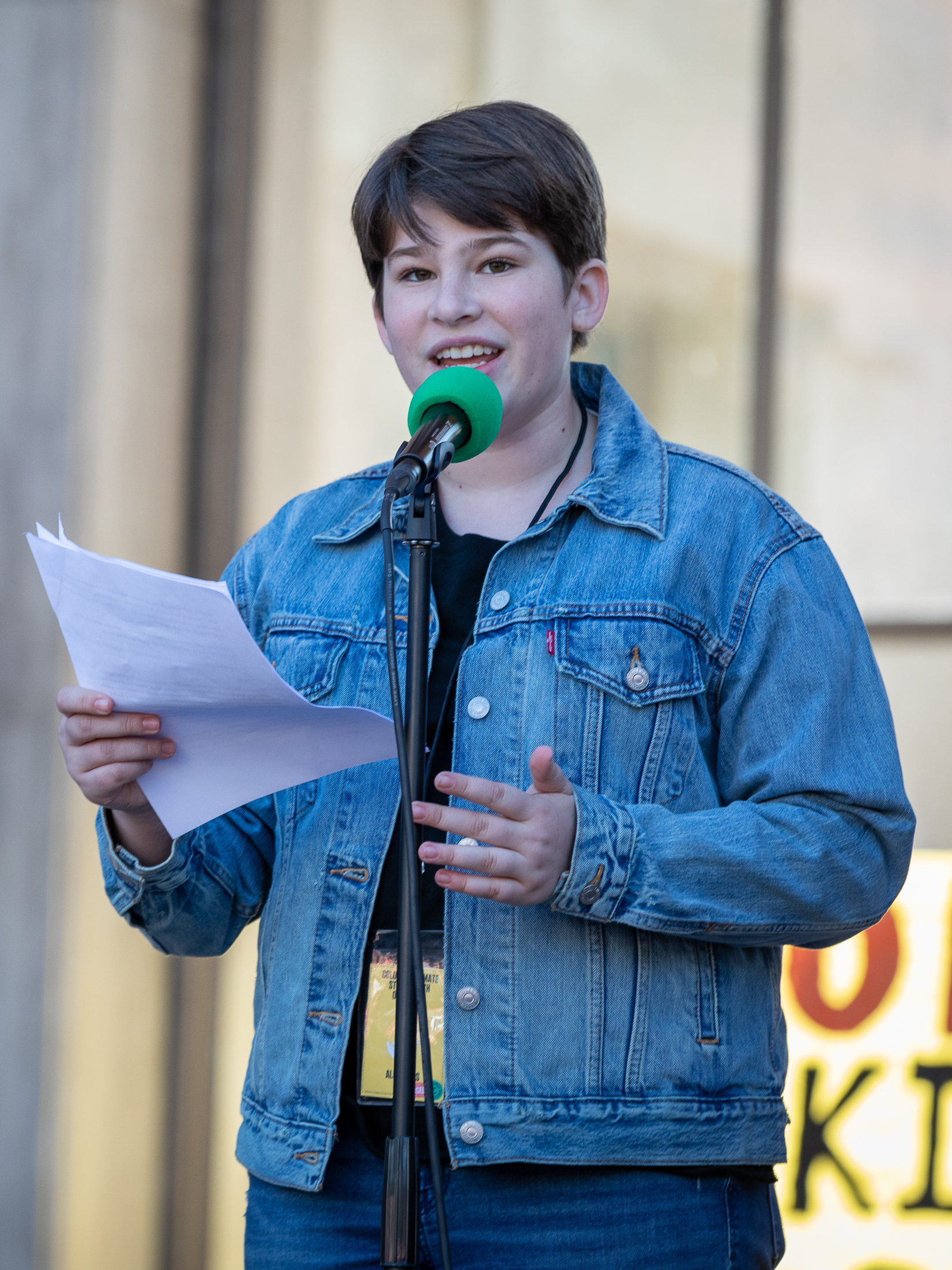
- Coleman in 2019
- Born: March 29, 2006 (age 20)
- Occupation: Student
- Organization: Youth climate strike
- Known for: Environmental activism

Haven Coleman (born March 29, 2006) is an American climate and environmental activist. She is the co-founder and co-executive director of U.S. Youth Climate Strike with youth activists Alexandria Villaseñor and Isra Hirsi, an organization dedicated to raising awareness and promoting change concerning the climate crisis.

== Early life ==
Haven Coleman was born in Denver, Colorado. She is a student of Denver Public Schools.

== Activism ==
Coleman became interested in environmentalism when she was ten years old: after learning that her favorite animal, sloths, are diminishing due to deforestation. She then made significant lifestyle changes inspired by sustainable living. Her training at Climate Reality Project educated her further.

After seeing the environmental activism of Greta Thunberg and youth climate strikes in Europe, she was inspired to do the same. Thus, since January 2019, at 13 years old, she began protesting in front of businesses or government buildings, such as the Colorado State Capitol. Every Friday she goes on strike to demand political action regarding air quality, coal plant retirement, renewable energy, etc. Coleman also e-mailed elected officials concerning the issue. She was allegedly bullied by peers in school who thought her stark activism was strange.

Coleman would protest alone until she was able to establish the US Youth Climate Strike together with Isra Hirsi and Alexandria Villasenor. Since then, climate strikes have been conducted across many states in the USA. On March 15, an international youth protest with over 120+ countries involved was held.

Coleman went viral after speaking to state Senator Cory Gardner about carbon polluters on a public forum at the town hall. She implored him to take action and offered to organize a grassroots movement to facilitate, however, Gardner refused.

As she made headlines, she caught the attention of Al Gore, who invited Coleman to speak for the 24 Hours of Reality campaign organized by The Climate Reality Project.

Coleman is presently working on Arid Agency, which is geared towards assisting environmental and social justice campaigns.
