= Stephen Fry's 21st Century Firsts =

2020 television documentary presented by Stephen Fry

Stephen Fry's 21st Century Firsts is a 2020 television documentary in which Stephen Fry explores the "top 21 ‘firsts’ of the 21st century" in the millennium's coming of age year and the change in daily life caused by these.

== Synopsis ==
Stephen Fry presents day-to-day innovations in medicine, technology, sports, culture and society accompanied by experts, celebrities and ordinary people and how these affected daily life. It also depicts how these "are now taken for granted, but Fry reveals how they have transformed our lives." The "polymath Fry" goes on to "[ask] what the next two decades [may] have in store for us."

== Production ==
Jo Clinton-Davis, from ITV, commissioned Spun Gold TV's producer Louise Quayle and executive producer Bridget Boseley to make the documentary, which was directed by Christian Watt. The one-off 90-minute special aired simultaneously on ITV and STV at 8:30 p.m. on 30 December 2020. It was rebroadcast on ITV at 12:10 a.m. on 31 December 2020.

== Reception ==
The Daily Telegraph's Anita Singh gave the documentary three out of five stars, stating "I wish I had watched this show with a teenager, just to see how astounded they would be at the things we didn't have 20 years ago" and called "[i]t...shallow stuff but the little interviews occasionally produced gems." Signh also noted the little air-time given to September 11 attacks and the 2008 financial crisis, focusing more on "Kate Moss's Topshop range and flat whites." Nevertheless, i's Emily Baker, avered that "while cultural and technological advancements are the main concern here, Fry is interested in the century's most significant political events too." For his part, i's Gerard Gilbert asserted that its depiction of advancements was "a mostly incontestable (although Chris Packham gamely contests the inclusion of the Harry Potter films) list that included satnavs, social media and same-sex marriages. Phil Harrison, one of The Guardian's television critics, declared that in the documentary "[t]ech enthusiast Fry offers a hymn of praise to modernity." The Sunday Telegraph called it "fast-paced" and "[w]ith 21 years to fit into just over an hour it's not surprising that the show jumps all over the place... [t]hat said, there are some genuinely illuminating moments." However, it concluded that "[u]ltimately though, this is pretty much a trawl through what you'd expect." The Daily Mirror's Anne Richardson noted that it "[felt] like it's a bit early for a century review...but they're selling this as "the 21st century reaches its 21st birthday", so we guess we'll let it go." Joe Clay of The Times stated that Fry "assisted by a roster of talking heads [had] a witty and informative look at all the things that have happened for the first time since 1 January 2000." For his part, Charlie Bradley, of the Daily Express, stated that Fry's goal "to dissect the first two decades of this century [was] a tall order given the amount of controversy and drama that has taken place in this chaotic time period." The Sunday Times' Victoria Segal called the documentary "Nostalgia TV" and identified that the use of "[h]igh-calibre talking heads — including Chris Packham and Rebecca Front — bring the observational comedy."

Daniel Furn, from Radio Times, called it "[a] fitting reflection as we near the New Year," while The Irish Times' David Courtney named it one of the "46 of the best shows to watch this holiday week." Moreover, Huff Post's Ash Parcival christened it one of "the 50 best shows you won't want to miss," and Yahoo! News added it to its list of "[t]he best shows on UK telly." Additionally, TellyMix's Josh Darvill asserted that it "[i]lustrated with a rich mix of archive, [turning] the clock back 20 years and [the audience will] witness the great pace of change and ponder what the next 20 years will bring. Nonetheless, The Courier's Paul Whitelaw wasn't as lauditive, calling it an "uttelry pointless list show [presented by] cosy centrist tech-lover [Fry]" and that "this broling cultural stew, deserves hours of analysis." Whitelaw noted that "Fry admitted that it was a whistle-stop tour, but that was no excuse for a programme in which Harry Potter trampled over the election of Barack Obama and the voice of Greta Thunberg," and went on to allege that "Fry was just picking up a festive paycheque." Upon the documentary's release, The National, inspired by the use of the number twenty-one, noted that "[t]hose born that year are now coming of age, while others who were 21 back then have discovered whether or not life really does begin at 40."
