= Freedom to Create =

International nonprofit organisation

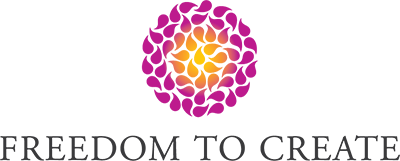
- Founded: 2006
- Type: Non-profit organization
- Registration no.: 201614361Z
- Location: Singapore
- Region served: Worldwide
- Website: www.freedomtocreate.com

Freedom to Create is an international nonprofit organization. Founded in 2006, it partners with national governments and leaders to promote good governance and policy reforms, as well as promote principled, effective public leadership. Freedom to Create provides public sector training, counsel, and resources to national and local leaders by drawing on the expertise of global government experts, practitioners, and researchers.

== History ==
From 2006 to 2011, Freedom to Create focused on using the power of the arts to inspire creativity and build social harmony in developing countries. It supported developments in the arts in countries experiencing intolerance and conflict, making in total over 240 grants in over 80 countries. Its anchor program was the Freedom to Create Prize, an international award that supported artists striving for social change in regions with significant barriers to expression. The Prize was complemented by global art exhibitions that showcased the works of these artists. The organization also coordinated the Freedom to Create Forums, which provided a platform for female global leaders to identify initiatives that would accelerate female empowerment.

In 2016, Freedom to Create relaunched with a focus on public policy and national governance. It partners with national leaders to create the conditions for long-term prosperity by investing in good governance, leadership, and policy design.

In 2016, Freedom to Create partnered with Oliver Wyman and the National University of Singapore Energy Studies Institute to research issues facing the electricity sector and healthcare financing system in Zambia.

In 2017, Freedom to Create launched the Freedom to Create 'Trilogy', which is a three-part report providing frameworks for good governance, policy design, public leadership, and holistic nation building.
