= Isra Hirsi =

American environmental activist (born 2003)

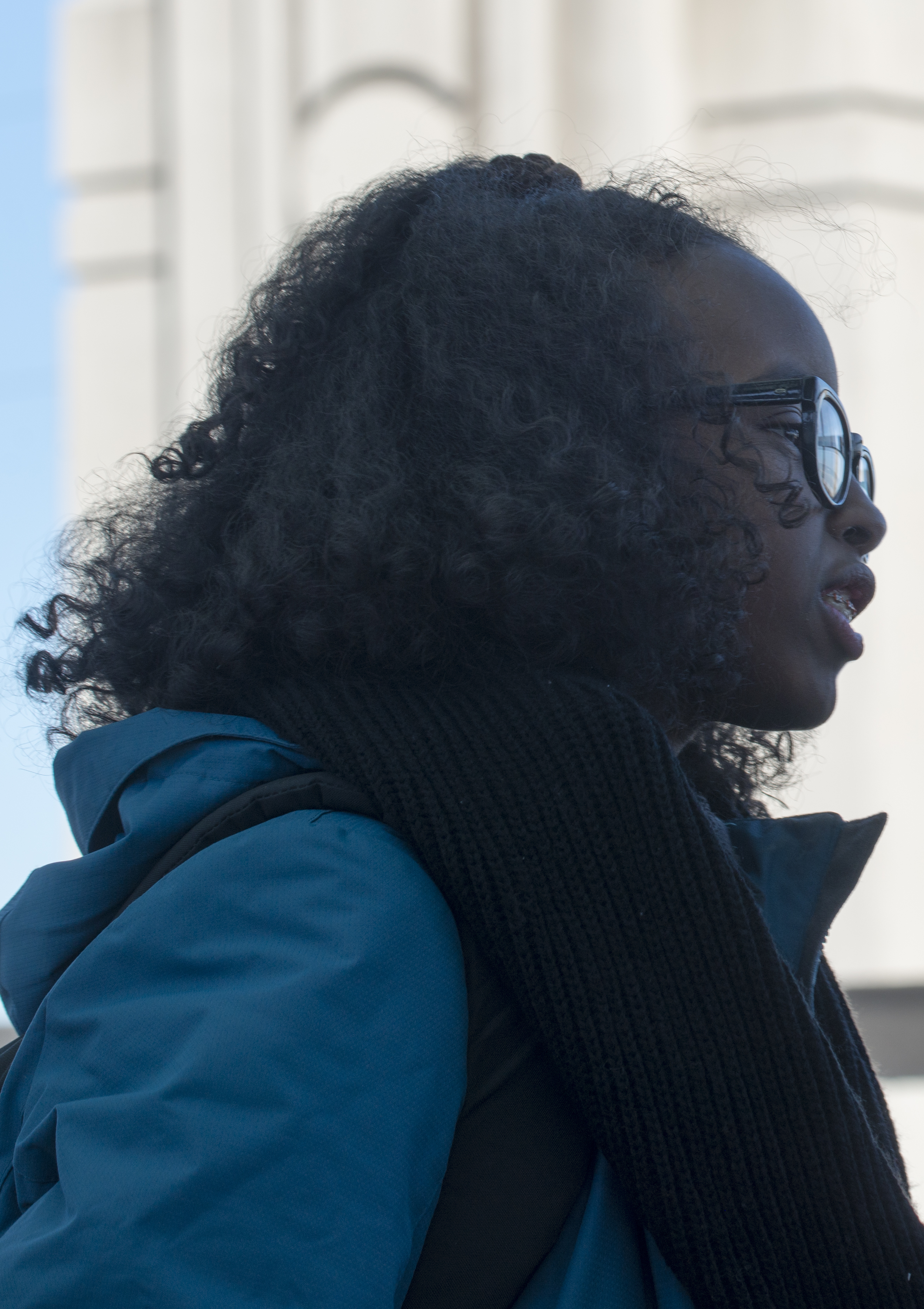
- Hirsi in 2018
- Born: February 22, 2003 (age 23); Minneapolis, Minnesota, U.S.
- Education: Barnard College
- Known for: Environmental Activism
- Movement: Youth Climate Strike
- Parent(s): Ilhan Omar; Ahmed Abdisalan Hirsi
- Awards: Brower Youth Award (2019)

Isra Hirsi (born February 22, 2003) is an American environmental activist. She co-founded and served as the co-executive director of the U.S. Youth Climate Strike. In 2020, she was named in the Fortune's 40 Under 40 Government and Politics list. She is the daughter of U.S. Representative Ilhan Omar.

== Early life and education ==
Hirsi was born on February 22, 2003, in Minneapolis, Minnesota, to Somali American U.S. Congresswoman Ilhan Omar and Ahmed Abdisalan Hirsi. Hirsi attended Minneapolis South High School, which she graduated from in 2021. She became involved in climate activism after joining her high school's environmental club in her freshman year.

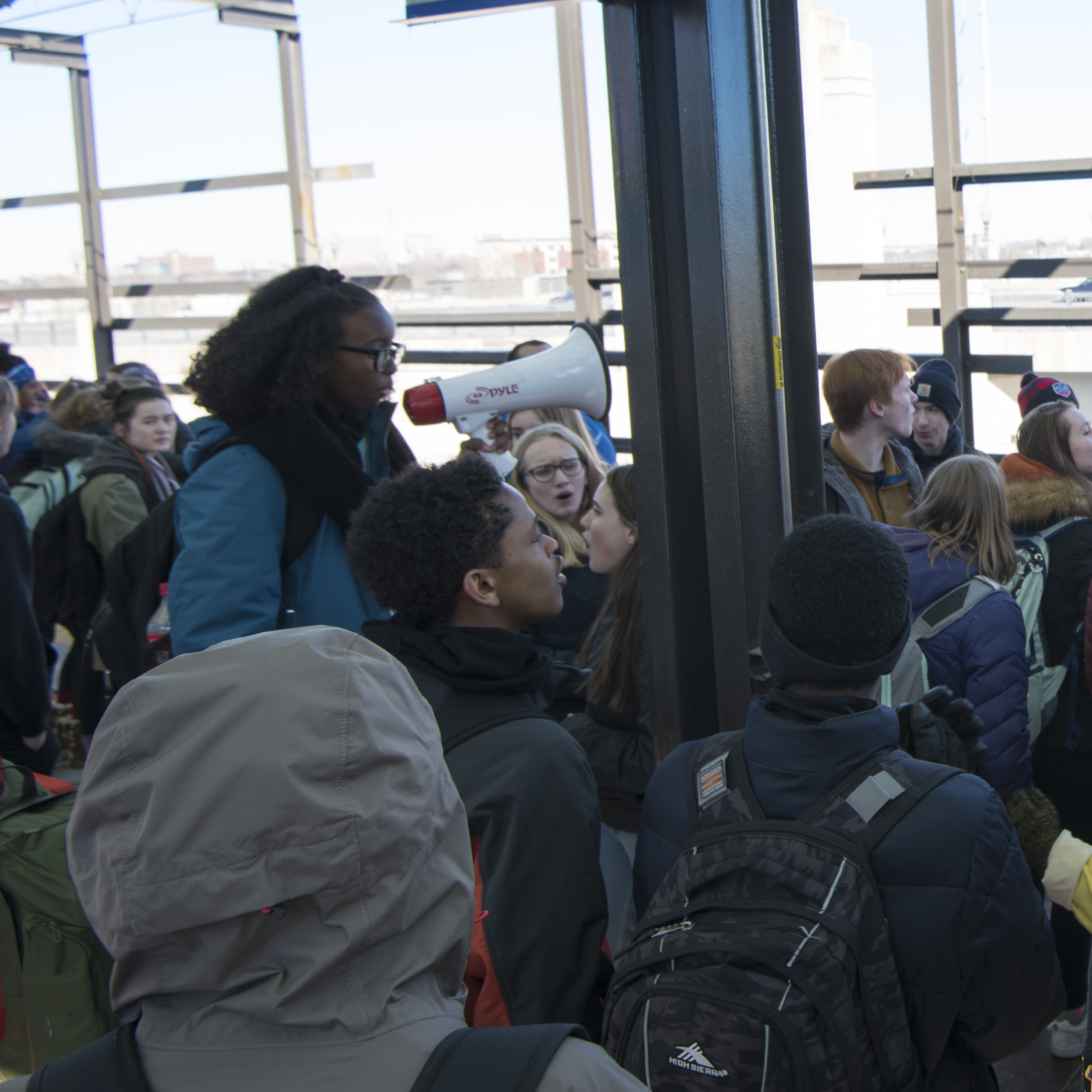
Hirsi protesting against gun violence in 2018

Hirsi attended Barnard College of Columbia University prior to her suspension. She began studying there in fall 2021. She was suspended after participating in an on-campus tent encampment protesting the university's investments in Israel and Israel's invasion of Gaza on April 18, 2024. Hirsi has said that she will continue protesting until her "demands are met."

== Activism ==
At the age of 12, she was one of the participants protesting against the killing of Jamar Clark at the Mall of America.

Hirsi coordinated the organization of hundreds of student-led strikes across the United States on March 15 and May 3, 2019. She co-founded the U.S. Youth Climate Strike, the American arm of a global youth climate change movement, in January 2019. She acts as the co-executive director of this group. She served as the chair of the Minnesota chapter of the High School Democrats of America during the 2018–2019 term. In 2019, she won a Brower Youth Award. That same year, Hirsi received the Voice of the Future Award. In 2020, Hirsi was placed on BET's "Future 40" list.

Hirsi participated in the Gaza Solidarity Encampment, part of broader protests at Columbia University calling on the university to divest from Israel amid the war and genocide in Gaza. On April 18, 2024, Hirsi was suspended from Barnard College for taking part in what Barnard College claimed to be an "unauthorized encampment" protest on the property of Columbia University. She was subsequently arrested by the New York Police Department in the mass arrest of student demonstrators that day and released that evening.

== Authored articles ==
- Fernands, Maddy; Hirsi, Isra; Coleman, Haven; Villaseñor, Alexandria (March 7, 2019). "Adults won't take climate change seriously. So we, the youth, are forced to strike". Bulletin of the Atomic Scientists.
- Hirsi, Isra (March 25, 2019). "The climate movement needs more people like me". Grist.
