= Rights and Resources Initiative =

International non-governmental organization focused on land and forest rights

- Type: International non-governmental organization
- Industry: Land tenure forestry
- Founded: 2005
- Headquarters: 2445 M Street NW, Suite 520, Washington, DC 20037, United States
- Website: rightsandresources.org

The Rights and Resources Initiative (RRI) is a non-governmental organization and global coalition working to encourage forest tenure and policy reforms for Indigenous, Afro-descendant, and other rural communities in Asia, Africa, and Latin America. RRI promotes community-led conservation and climate mitigation as the most effective global solution to climate change and biodiversity loss, and supports local livelihoods and economies for sustainable economic development. RRI works at the country, regional and global levels, collaborating on research, advocacy and convening strategic actors across sectors.

The RRI Coalition's 200 plus member organizations are directly engaged in land and forest policy reforms in over 30 countries. They include Indigenous, Afro-descendant, and local community rightsholders' organizations and their allies in civil society and the international development sector. RRI's strategic, collective action goes beyond the traditional set of development actors to involve a wide spectrum of organizations in the public, private, and nonprofit sectors, each of which provides a critical perspective in the larger ecosystem to advance change.

The Rights and Resources Initiative was formally established in 2005 by the Coordinating Association of Indigenous and Community Agroforestry in Central America (ACICAFOC), the Center for International Forestry Research (CIFOR), Forest Trends, the Foundation for People and Community Development Papua New Guinea (FPCD), the International Union for Conservation of Nature (IUCN), and RECOFTC - The Center for People and Forests. In 2006, the Forest Peoples Programme, HELVETAS Swiss Intercooperation, and the World Agroforestry Centre joined as RRI Partners. Civic Response joined in 2007, Federation of Community Forest Users Nepal (FECOFUN) joined in 2008, and the Samdhana Institute joined in January 2009. In late 2010, the Indigenous Peoples' International Centre for Policy Research and Education (Tebtebba) joined, followed by International Forestry Resources and Institutions (IFRI), the Salvadoran Research Program on Development and Environment (PRISMA), and the Centre for Environment and Development (CED) in 2011. The coalition is headquartered in Washington, D.C.

== Mission ==
RRI’s Mission is to support local communities’ and indigenous peoples’ struggles against poverty and marginalization by promoting greater global commitment and action towards policy, market and legal reforms that secure their rights to own, control and benefit from natural resources, especially land and forests.

== Activities ==
RRI pro-actively engages with governments, civil society and community organizations to encourage institutional reforms, advance new understanding of threats and opportunities, encourage innovative and promising new models of forest tenure and enterprise, and catalyze more effective intervention on tenure and governance.

== Governance ==
The Rights and Resources Initiative is governed by the Board of Directors, which meets three times a year. The Board also receives input on governance of the RRI from regular meetings of the Partners, which often take place simultaneously with meetings of the Board.

The coalition is coordinated and supported by the Rights and Resources Group, a small organization that serves as the coordination mechanism for the Rights and Resources Initiative. Rights and Resources Group is a non-profit 501(c)(3) organization located in Washington, DC and was founded October 26, 2005 and is a DBA (Doing Business As) of Rights and Resources Institute, Inc.

== Current coalition partners ==
- Centre for Environment and Development, Cameroon
- CIFOR
- Civic Response
- FECOFUN Nepal
- Forest Peoples Programme
- Forest Trends
- Helvetas
- International Forestry Resources and Institutions (IFRI)
- Landesa
- Organización Nacional de Mujeres Indígenas Andinas y Amazónicas del Perú (ONAMIAP)
- PRISMA
- Samdhana Institute
- Tebtebba
- World Agroforestry Centre
