= Aliyu Salisu Barau =

Nigerian academic

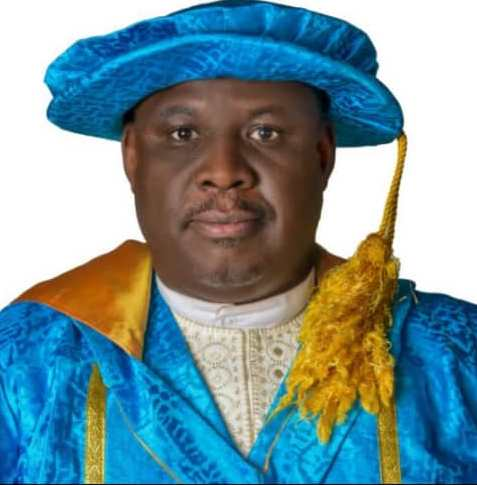
- Born: 1974 (age 51–52); Kano, Nigeria

Aliyu Salisu Barau is a Nigerian academic and a professor of Urban and Regional Planning at Bayero University Kano. He served as the Dean of the Faculty of Earth and Environmental Sciences at Bayero University Kano from 2023 to 2025 and is the West Africa Hub Director of the Urban Climate Change Research Network (UCCRN), affiliated with the Earth Institute, Columbia University. He is also a Chartered Town Planner of the UK's Royal Town Planning Institute (RTPI).

== Education ==
Aliyu Salisu Barau obtained his Bachelor's degree in Geography in 1999, and a Master's degree in Land Resources in 2008, both from Bayero University Kano. He received his doctorate degree from the University of Technology Malaysia (UTM) in 2015.

== Career ==
- Dean, Faculty of Earth and Environmental Sciences/ Member of the University Management Committee/Member of the Senate. Bayero University Kano (Since March, 2023).
- Director West Africa Hub, Urban Climate Change Research Network (UCCRN) affiliated with Earth Institute, Columbia University, New York appointed 2020.
- Founder and head of the Millennials and Resilience: City, Innovation and Transformation of Youths Laboratory, or the MR CITY Lab. An SDG Lab initially funded by Future Earth, Stockholm Resilience Centre and The University of Tokyo Integrated Research System for Sustainability Science (IR3s). MR CITY Lab aims to generate prototype solutions to complex sustainability problems.
- Alternate Member, Multidisciplinary Experts Panel: Intergovernmental Platform for Biodiversity and Ecosystem Services Science and Policy (IPBES) IPBES Secretariat Bonn Germany.
- Member of the IPCC Scientific Steering Committee for the Cities and Climate Change International Scientific Conference. This is the first IPCC meeting on cities and climate change held in 2018 in Edmonton, Canada. The conference aims to feed into IPCC AR7 Special Report on Cities and Climate Change.
- Commission Member: International Union for Conservation of Nature (IUCN's) World Commission on Protected Areas (with concurrent role in Climate change, Governance of Protected and Conserved Areas, Urban Conservation Strategies networks) – 2018–2021 reappointed 2021–2025.
- Environmental Advocacy for fostering conservation of culturally and historically important heritage sites such as the Kano City walls, open and green spaces including campaign against removing of old trees on Abuja-Kano Dual Carriage Way Rehabilitation project sites of Julius Berger Nigeria Plc for which the construction giant obliges positively.
- 2013—Research Fellow, Earth System Governance Project (Future Earth). This is the world's largest social science research network in the area of governance and global environmental change.
- Aliyu led development of some Apps available on Play Store namely BUKTrees.

== Public engagement ==
Aliyu Salisu Barau engages with the public through regular writing on multiple environmental issues in Nigeria and beyond especially in English and Hausa languages. He has featured several enlightenment programs monitored by the BBC, DW, VOA, and local and regional radio and TV stations such as Freedom Radio, Arewa24 among others. He has co-produced short films for public environmental education and engagement science-policy-science community. Aliyu is also widely reported by the top Nigerian newspapers on environment, climate, energy, SDGs, biodiversity conservation and land degradation. Barau has a keen interest in using short films for public education and engagement for positive land climate action. He has co-produced three short films on drylands landscape restoration.

== Selected publications ==
- Barau, Aliyu Salisu (2023). "Transitioning to inclusive and nature-based decarbonisaton through recreating tree-based artisanal industries in Kano City, Nigeria". Norsk Geografisk Tidsskrift – Norwegian Journal of Geography. 77 (3): 171–182. Bibcode:2023NGTid..77..171B. doi:10.1080/00291951.2023.2227970 – via Routledge.
- Barau, Aliyu Salisu; Abubakar, Ismaila Rimi; Kafi, Kamil Muhammad; Olugbodi, Kemi Hamdat; Abubakar, Jibrin Ibrahim (2023-06-12). "Dynamics of negotiated use of public open spaces between children and adults in an African city". Land Use Policy. 131 106705. Bibcode:2023LUPol.13106705B. doi:10.1016/j.landusepol.2023.106705 – via Elsevier.
- Barau, Aliyu Salisu; Kafi, Kamil Muhammad; Mu'allim, Mubina Auwal; Dallimer, Martin; Hassan, Abdulaziz (2023-06-03). "Comparative mapping of smellscape clusters and associated air quality in Kano City, Nigeria: An analysis of public perception, hotspots, and inclusive decision support tool". Sustainable Cities and Society. 96 104680. Bibcode:2023SusCS..9604680B. doi:10.1016/j.scs.2023.104680. Archived from the original on 21 August 2023 – via Elsevier Science Direct.
- Barau, Aliyu Salisu; Kafi, Kamil Muhammad; Sodangi, Abubakar Bawa; Usman, Suleiman Gambo (2023). "Recreating African biophilic urbanism: the roles of millennials, native trees, and innovation labs in Nigeria". Cities & Health. 7 (2): 213–223. Bibcode:2023CitHe...7..213B. doi:10.1080/23748834.2020.1763892 – via Taylor and Francis.
- Ürge-Vorsatz, Diana; Rosenzweig, Cynthia; Dawson, Richard J.; Sanchez Rodriguez, Roberto; Bai, Xuemei; Barau, Aliyu Salisu; Seto, Karen C.; Dhakal, Shobhakar (2018). "Locking in positive climate responses in cities". Nature Climate Change. 8 (3): 174–177. Bibcode:2018NatCC...8..174U. doi:10.1038/s41558-018-0100-6.
- Barau, Aliyu Salisu (2017). "Tension in the periphery: An analysis of spatial, public and corporate views on landscape change in Iskandar Malaysia". Landscape and Urban Planning. 165: 256–266. Bibcode:2017LUrbP.165..256B. doi:10.1016/j.landurbplan.2016.04.007 – via Elsevier Science Direct.
- Barau, Aliyu Salisu (2015). "Perceptions and contributions of households towards sustainable urban green infrastructure in Malaysia". Habitat International. 57: 285–297. doi:10.1016/j.habitatint.2015.02.003 – via Elsevier Science Direct.
- Colenbrander, Sarah; Barau, Aliyu Salisu (2019). "Planning and financing urban development in the context of the climate crisis". International Journal of Urban Sustainable Development. 11 (3): 237–244. Bibcode:2019IJUSD..11..237C. doi:10.1080/19463138.2019.1673529.
- Mohsen, Roshan; Barau, Aliyu Salisu (2016). "Assessing Anadolic daylighting system for efficient daylight in open plan office". Journal of Building Engineering. 8: 5869. doi:10.1016/j.jobe.2016.07.002 – via Elsevier Science Direct.
- Barau, Aliyu Salisu; Stringer, Lindsay (2015). "Access to and allocation of ecosystem services in Malaysia's Pulau Kukup Ramsar Site". Ecosystem Services. 16: 167–173. Bibcode:2015EcoSv..16..167S. doi:10.1016/j.ecoser.2015.10.021 – via Elsevier Science Direct.
- Barau, Aliyu Salisu; Al Hosani, Naeema (2015). "Prospects of Environmental Governance in Addressing Sustainability Risks of Seawater Desalination Plants in the Arabian Gulf". Environmental Science & Policy. 50: 145–154. doi:10.1016/j.envsci.2015.02.008 – via Elsevier Science Direct.
- Barau, Aliyu Salisu; Qureshi, Salman (2015). "Using agent-based modelling and landscape metrics to assess landscape fragmentation in Iskandar Malaysia". Ecological Processes. 4 (1): 1–11. doi:10.1016/j.envsci.2015.02.008 – via Springer.
- Barau, A.S.; Ludin, A.N.M (2012) Intersection of Landscape, Anthropocene and Fourth Paradigm. Living Reviews in Landscape Research, vol.6 no.1, 2012 (published by Leibniz Centre for Agricultural Landscape Research (ZALF), Germany.
- Kafi, K.M.; Barau, A.S.; Aliyu, A. (2021) The effects of windstorm in African medium-sized cities: An analysis of the degree of damage using KDE hotspots and EF-scale matrix. International Journal of Disaster Risk Reduction. doi.org/10.1016/j.ijdrr.2021.102070. (Elsevier).
- Barau, Aliyu Salisu; Abubakar, Aliyu Haidar; Kiyawa, Abdul Hakim Ibrahim (2020). "Not there yet: Mapping inhibitions to solar energy utilisation by households in african informal urban neighbourhoods". Sustainability. 12 (3): 840. doi:10.3390/su12030840.
- Barau, Aliyu Salisu; Stringer, Lindsay; Adamu, Abdalla Uba (2016). "Environmental ethics and future oriented transformation to sustainability in sub-Saharan Africa". Journal of Cleaner Production. 135: 1539–1547. doi:10.1016/j.jclepro (inactive 11 July 2025) – via Elsevier Science Direct.
- Barau, Aliyu Salisu; Ludin, A. N. M; Said, Ismail (2013). "Socio-ecological systems and biodiversity conservation in African city: insights from Kano Emir's Palace gardens". Urban Ecosystems. 16 (4): 783–800. Bibcode:2013UrbEc..16..783B. doi:10.1007/s11252-012-0276-x – via Springer.
- Bai, Xuemei; Dawson, Richard J.; Ürge-Vorsatz, Diana; Delgado, Gian C.; Barau, Aliyu Salisu; Dhakal, Shobhakar; Dodman, David; Leonardsen, Lykke; Masson-Delmotte, Valérie; Roberts, Debra C.; Schultz, Seth (2018). "Six research priorities for cities and climate change". Nature. 555 (7694): 23–25. Bibcode:2018Natur.555...23B. doi:10.1038/d41586-018-02409-z.
- Rodriguez, Roberto Sanchez; Ürge-Vorsatz, Diana; Barau, Aliyu Salisu (2018). "Sustainable Development Goals and climate change adaptation in cities". Nature Climate Change. 8 (3): 181–183. Bibcode:2018NatCC...8..181S. doi:10.1038/s41558-018-0098-9 – via Nature.
- Patterson, James; Schulz, Karsten; Vervoort, Joost; van der Hel, Sandra; Widerberg, Oscar; Adler, Carolina; Hurlbert, Margot; Anderton, Karen; Sethi, Mahendra; Barau, Aliyu Salisu (2017). "Exploring the governance and politics of transformations towards sustainability". Environmental Innovation and Societal Transitions. 24: 1–16. Bibcode:2017EIST...24....1P. doi:10.1016/j.eist.2016.09.001. hdl:20.500.11850/121804 – via Elsevier Science Direct.
- Barau, Aliyu Salisu; Maconachie, Roy; Ludin, A. N.M; Abdulhamid, Adnan (2015). "Urban morphology dynamics and environmental change in Kano, Nigeria". Land Use Policy. 42: 307–317. Bibcode:2015LUPol..42..307B. doi:10.1016/j.landusepol.2014.08.007 – via Elsevier Science Direct.
- Colenbrander, Sarah; Barau, Aliyu Salisu (2019). "Guest Editors – Special Issue of Seven Papers from Africa, Europe and Asia is entitled: Planning and financing climate-safe cities". International Journal of Urban Sustainable Development. 11 (3): 237–345. Bibcode:2019IJUSD..11..237C. doi:10.1080/19463138.2019.1673529 – via (Taylor and Francis).

=== Selected books ===
- Barau, Aliyu Salisu (2007). The Great Attractions of Kano. Research and Documentation Directorate Government House Kano. ISBN 978-978-8109-33-4.
- Barau, Aliyu Salisu (2006). An account of the high population in Kano State. Kano: Research and Documentation Directorate, Government House, Kano. pp. 1–29.
- Barau, Aliyu Salisu(2004). "Environment and Sustainable Development in the Qur’an." International Institute of Islamic Thought(IIIT), Kano-Nigeria (2004).

=== Various reports ===
- Chapter Scientist, (Chapter 4: Land Degradation) IPCC Special Report on climate change, desertification, land degradation, sustainable land management, food security and greenhouse gas fluxes in terrestrial ecosystems.
- Lead Author, Special Report on SDG 11 and Land Restoration Chapter. Commissioned by International Resource Panel of the UN Environment.
- 2015–2018 – Expert/Lead Author – Intergovernmental Platform for Science and Policy for Biodiversity and Ecosystem Services – IPBES Africa Assessment Report.
- 2018 – 2019– Contributor/Co-Author, the UN Habitat Guiding Principles for Urban-Rural Linkages to Advance Integrated Territorial Development. This framework is designed to support countries implement 2030 Agenda for Sustainable Development (SDGs) and the New Urban Agenda (NUA)
- Executive Producer/Script writer – three Hausa short cartoons on public education on flood risk management (PASET/ICIPE Do-it-For Commons research project 2020–2023).
- Member of the Editorial Team, Climate change and cities: Third Assessment Report of the Urban Climate Change Research Network (ARC 3.3). Cambridge University Press. (This comprises twelve book elements published by the Cambridge University Press).
- Co-author of the Global Research and Action Agenda on Cities and Climate Change Science (GRAA). The Agenda aims to generate greater knowledge in support of practice and decision-making in urban areas, through collaborative research efforts. GRAA was supported by the IPCC, UN Habitat, WCRP, WMO, UNEP, ICLEI, C40, UCLG, Cities Alliance.

== Awards ==
- Recipient of the 2023 Africa Ecologist Award by the British Ecological Society.
- World Social Science Fellow (Sustainable Urbanisation) of the International Social Science Council, Research Fellow – Earth System Governance Project. World Social Science Fellow (Sustainable Urbanisation), appointed by the International Social Science Council (ISSC) of UNESCO as The ISSC is now renamed International Science Council.
- 2018 Top reviewer (top 1%) cross-field Clarivate/Web of Science.
- Honourable Mention Award for Unique Landscapes and Places – International photographic competition organised by Association of American Geographers, awarded at the 56th Annual General Meeting of the April 2011 Seattle, Washington State, United States.
- Honourable Mention Award in International Environmental Essay Contest Third Edition, 1998 organised by Francis Marion University, Florence, South Carolina, United States.
- Recipient of the 2011 Chinese Academy of Sciences Travel Grant for International Association for Landscape Ecology (IALE) Congress in Beijing.
