= IFRI =

IFRI may refer to:

- International Forestry Resources and Institutions
- Institut Français de Recherche en Iran
- Institut français des relations internationales
