= Ayakha Melithafa =

South African climate activist (born 2001/02)

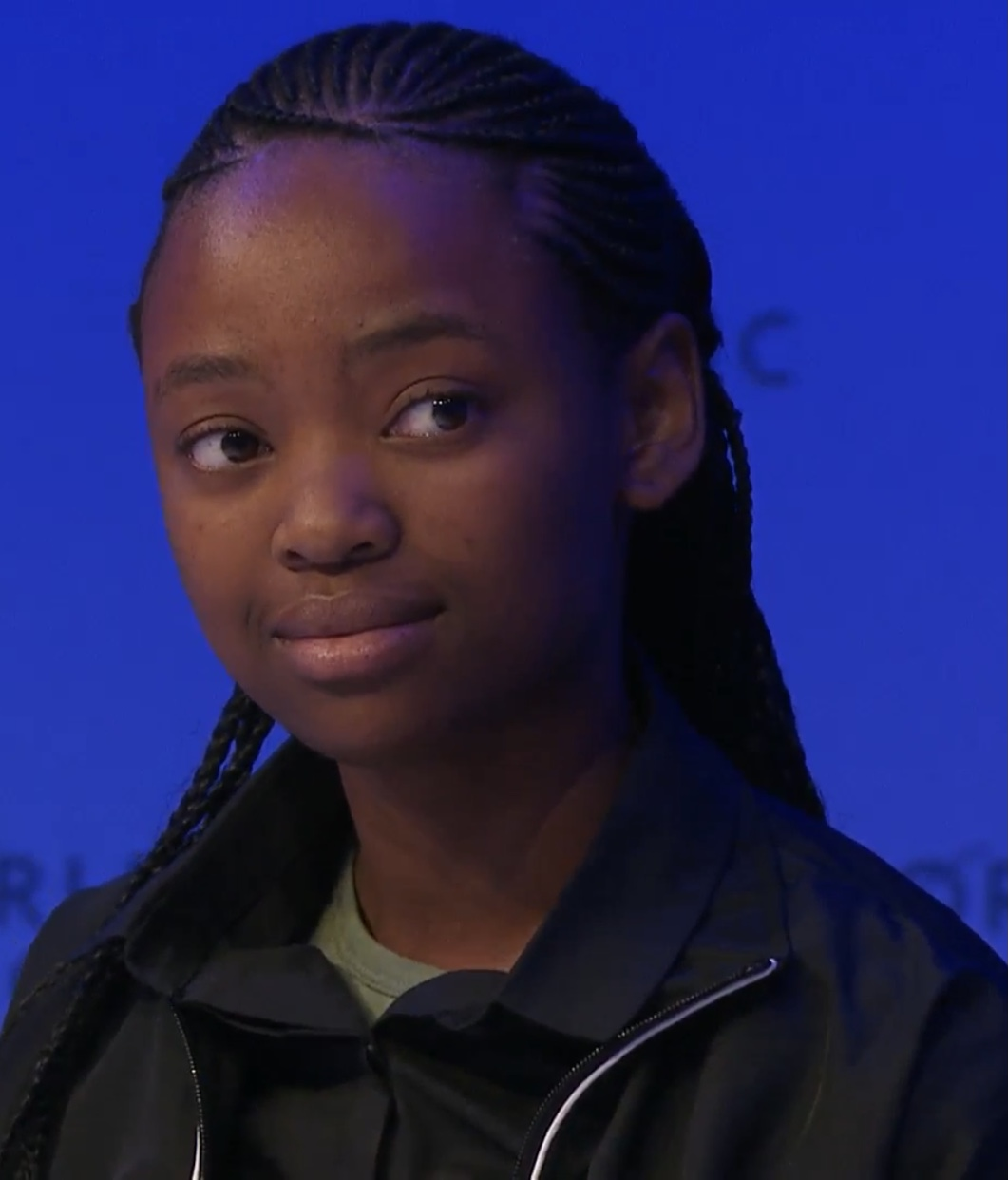
- Melithafa in 2020
- Born: 2001 or 2002 (age 23–24); Eerste River, Western Cape, South Africa

Ayakha Melithafa (born 2001 or 2002) is a South African environmental activist.

== Early life and education ==
Melithafa is from Eerste River, Western Cape, a suburb of Cape Town. She is currently a student at the Centre of Science and Technology in Khayelitsha.

== Climate activism ==
Melithafa was one of 16 children, including Greta Thunberg, Alexandria Villaseñor, Carl Smith, and Catarina Lorenzo to file a complaint to the United Nations Committee on the Rights of the Child for failing to adequately address the climate crisis.

Melithafa also contributed to the Project 90 by 2030 YouLead initiative, a South African organisation committed to a 90% reduction in carbon by 2030. She was recruited by Ruby Sampson in March 2019 to join the African Climate Alliance Youth Spokesteam, where she was given opportunities to do presentations, attend conferences and other climate action events. She also serves as a recruitment official for the African Climate Alliance.

In particular, Melithafa advocates for the inclusion of diverse voices in climate activism:

"It’s very important for poor people and people of colour to go to these protests and marches because they are feeling the wrath of climate change the most. It’s important for them to have a say, for their voice and their demands to be heard." --- Ayakha Melithafa
