= Thomas Tomich =

Thomas P. Tomich
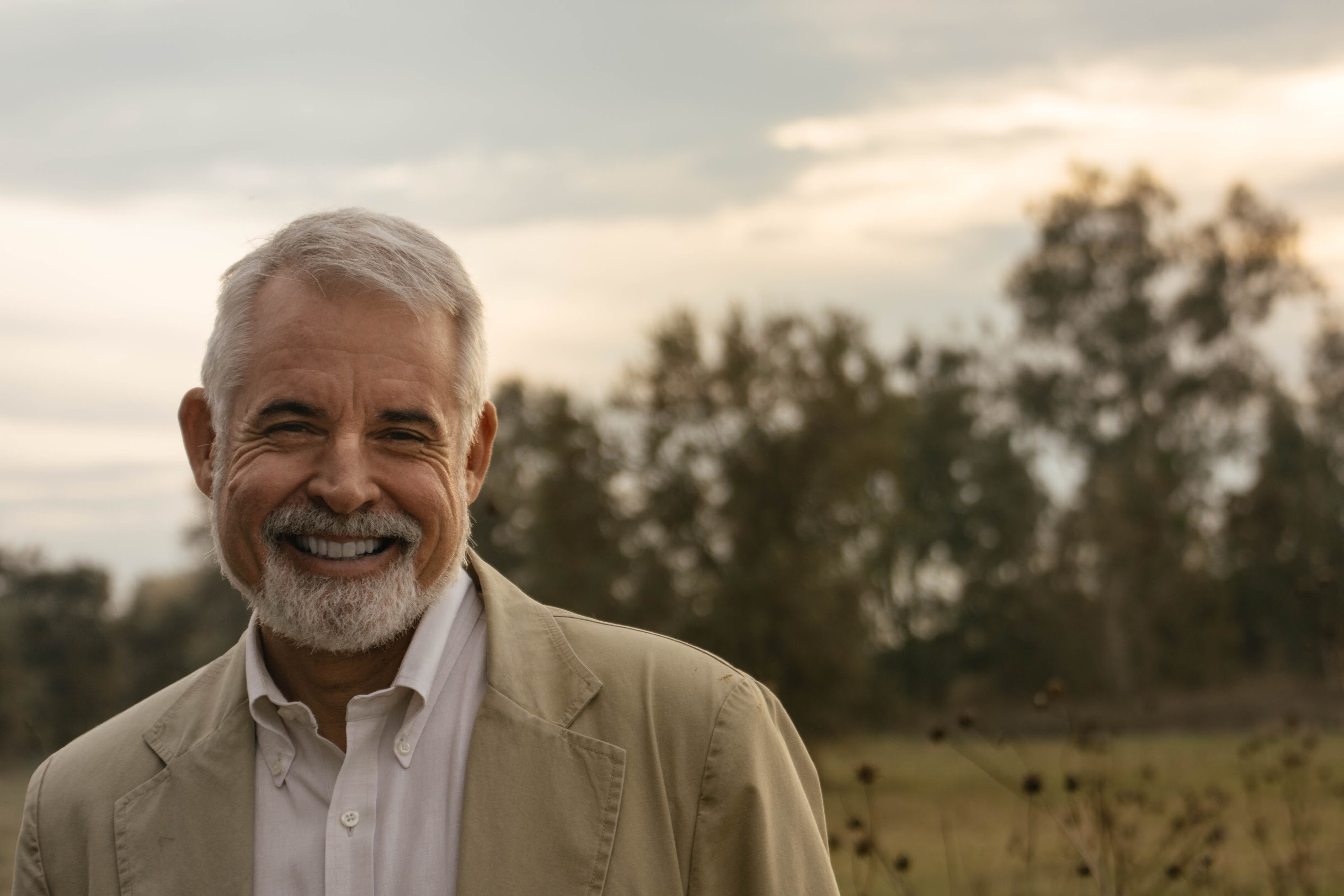
- Born: September 8, 1956 (age 68); San Jose, California, United States
- Education: University of California, Davis (BA); Stanford University (MA, PhD)
- Scientific career
- Institutions: Harvard Institute for International Development; World Agroforestry Centre; University of California, Davis
- Thesis: Private Land Reclamation in Egypt: Studies of Feasibility and Adaptive Behavior (1984)
- Doctoral advisor: Carl H. Gotsch

Thomas Patrick Tomich (born September 8, 1956) is an American researcher in the field of sustainable agriculture. He researches a variety of subjects, including agriculture, natural resource management, food policy, and economic development. He is the founding director of the Agricultural Sustainability Institute at University of California, Davis and an elected fellow of the American Association for the Advancement of Science. Tomich advocates for immediate and strategic action on the part of the research community to apply current scientific knowledge to address world-wide issues relating to climate change.

== Education ==
Thomas Patrick Tomich was born on September 8, 1956, in San Jose, California, to parents Lillian and Thomas Tomich. His family owned a fruit orchard in Orangevale, established by Thomas P. Tomich's great-grandparents in 1897. Tomich graduated from University of California, Davis with a bachelor's in economics in 1979. He attended Stanford University for his Master of Arts degree, graduating in 1982. He also received a PhD in agricultural and food system economics from Stanford, graduating in 1984.

== Career ==
Tomich worked for the Harvard Institute for International Development for ten years as a policy advisor and institute associate. From 1994-2006, he worked for the World Agroforestry Centre as principal economist and global coordinator of the ASB Partnership for the Tropical Forest Margins. He has been a professor at UC Davis since 2007. There, he is the founding director of the Agricultural Sustainability Institute. He was also the first holder of the WK Kellogg Endowed Chair in Sustainable Food Systems. He researches a variety of subjects, including agriculture, natural resource management, food policy, and economic development. As of 2015, he is the co-editor of the journal the Annual Review of Environment and Resources.

== Awards and honors ==
In 2019, Tomich was elected as a fellow to the American Association for the Advancement of Science.
