= Ashok Gadgil =

Energy efficiency researcher

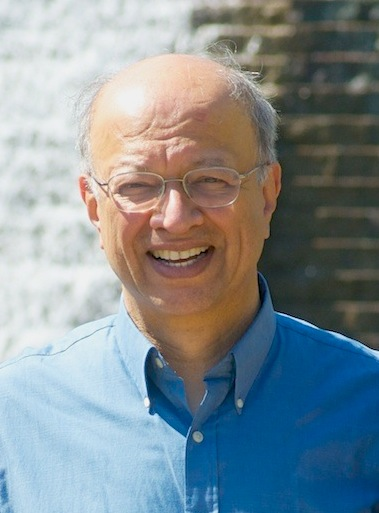
- Education: University of California, Berkeley, University of Mumbai, IIT Kanpur
- Awards: National Inventors Hall of Fame (2014); Leo Szilard Lectureship Award (2015); Heinz Awards (2009)
- Academic career
- Institutions: University of California, Berkeley; Lawrence Berkeley National Laboratory

Ashok Gadgil (born November 15, 1950, in Mumbai, India) is the Andrew and Virginia Rudd Family Foundation Distinguished Chair Emeritus, and Distinguished Professor of the Graduate School at the University of California, Berkeley. He is an Affiliate (Former Faculty Senior Scientist) and formerly served as Director of the Energy and Environmental Technologies Division at Lawrence Berkeley National Laboratory.

Gadgil specializes in heat transfer, fluid dynamics, and technology design for development. He has substantial experience in technical, economic, and policy research on energy efficiency and its implementation - particularly in developing countries. Three of his best-known technologies for the developing-world are "UV Waterworks" (a simple, effective, and inexpensive disinfection system for drinking water), the "Berkeley-Darfur Stove" (a low-cost sheet-metal stove that saves fuelwood in internally displaced person's camps in Darfur), and ECAR (ElectroChemical Arsenic Removal) for removing arsenic from water. Gadgil advocates for immediate and strategic action on the part of the research community to apply current scientific knowledge to address world-wide issues relating to climate change.

== Education ==
Gadgil holds a physics degree from the University of Mumbai, an M.Sc. in physics from Indian Institute of Technology Kanpur, and an M.Sc. (1975) and Ph.D. (1979) in physics from the University of California, Berkeley. After completing his Ph.D. he spent 5 years working for a non-profit in India before returning to Berkeley.

== Career ==
Gadgil is the Andrew and Virginia Rudd Family Foundation Distinguished Chair and Professor of Safe Water and Sanitation at the University of California, Berkeley. He also has been distinguished professor of civil and environmental engineering at the University of California, Berkeley. At Lawrence Berkeley National Laboratory (LBNL) Gadgil is a faculty senior scientist, and former director of the Environmental Energy Technologies Division (2009–2015). From 2012 to 2022, Gadgil was the faculty director of the Development Impact Lab at UC Berkeley. He has taught graduate courses at UC Berkeley since 2006 addressing topics such as "Design for Sustainable Communities," and "Technology and Sustainability".

Gadgil has served as editor of the journal Annual Review of Environment and Resources since 2009. Gadgil and Paul Gertler were the founding editors of the Open Access journal Development Engineering, first published by Elsevier in 2016.

In 1998 and again in 2006, Gadgil was invited by the Smithsonian Institution's Lemelson Center for the Study of Invention and Innovation to speak at the National Museum of American History about his life and work.

In September 2022, Springer published an Open Access graduate-level textbook Co-Edited by Gadgil, Introduction to Development Engineering: A Framework with Applications from the Field, freely downloadable from the Springer website.

== Research ==
External videos
- "Empathy and Efficiency: The Ashok Gadgil Story", June 7, 2019
- TDSAA "A chat with Prof. Ashok Gadgil", January 24, 2017
- TEDxGoldenGateED - Ashok Gadgil, October 24, 2011

Gadgil led a group of about 20 researchers at LBNL conducting experimental and modeling research in indoor airflow and pollutant transport. Most of that work was focused on reducing indoor radon concentrations in individual houses, and protecting office-building occupants from the threat of chemical and biological attacks.

In early 1990s, he analyzed the potential for large utility-sponsored projects to promote energy efficient electric lighting in poor households in developing countries, then teamed up with others to design and demonstrate such projects. These have become commonplace in dozens of developing countries since 2000 onward, saving billions of dollars annually to their economies.

"Every time there is a wicked problem, we should look for what are the wrong-headed incentives that keep it in place... You need to understand the feedback loops that are often complex and interacting that allow a wicked problem to persist. You need to find a way to cut the Gordian knot." Ashok Gadgil

In recent years, he has worked on ways to inexpensively remove arsenic from groundwater used for drinking, and clean-burning biomass stoves, including design, production, and dissemination of the improved cookstoves for Darfur (Sudan) refugees. Reducing the amount of fuel needed has helped to protect women from assault, for which they are at risk while foraging for fuel.

Gadgil has authored or co-authored at least 213 papers which are cited at least 3,805 times. He was elected a member of the National Academy of Engineering in 2013 for engineering solutions to the problems of potable water and energy in developing countries.

"I tell my students, if you want to take on a problem, take on a problem of scale where if you are successful, you make a real impact." Ashok Gadgil

=== UV Waterworks ===
External videos
- "Helping People Across the World: The Ashok Gadgil Story", May 28, 2014
- "Ashok Gadgil & team - UV water disinfection device (ceremony)", July 14, 2021.

UV Waterworks uses the UV light emitted by a low-pressure mercury discharge (similar to that in a fluorescent lamp) to disinfect drinking water. Effective disinfection at affordable cost is the primary and most important feature of UV Waterworks—allowing an entire system (including costs of pumps, filters, tanks, housing-structure, consumables, and employee salaries for operation) to sell drinking water at about 2 cents US for 12 liters even in deep rural areas, where personal incomes are commonly less than $1 US per day.

This business model, developed and implemented by WaterHealth International, makes safe drinking water affordable and accessible to even poor communities in developing countries. As of 2019 it provided safe drinking water for 26-29 million people in India and Africa. For UV Waterworks, Gadgil received the Discover Award in 1996 for the most significant environmental invention of the year, as well as the Popular Science Award for "Best of What is New - 1996".

=== Darfur Stoves Project ===
External videos
- "The Tech Awards 2013 laureate: The Darfur Stoves Project", November 14, 2013.

The Darfur Stoves Project seeks to protect Darfuri women by providing them with specially developed stoves which require less firewood, hence decreasing women's exposure to violence while collecting firewood and their need to trade food rations for fuel. The stoves were developed with input from the women who would use them, enabling the designers to ensure that they would not tip over and that they would cook at an appropriate heat.

The Darfur Stoves Project is the first initiative of the nonprofit organization, Potential Energy. Gadgil is a co-Founder and served as Board Chair of Potential Energy till 2015. Potential Energy's mission is to adapt and scale technologies that improve lives in developing countries. The Darfur Stoves Project collaborates with international organizations such as Oxfam America and the Sudanese organization, Sustainable Action Group (SAG). As of 2018, Potential Energy had distributed over 40,000 stoves to women in Darfur, Sudan. A single stove can last more than five years, saving 15-30% of a family's fuel costs, and reducing greenhouse gas emissions by two metric tons per year.

=== ECAR ===
External videos
- "ElectroChemical Arsenic Remediation (ECAR)", January 9, 2017.
- Electrochemical Arsenic Remediation by Gadgil Lab for Energy and Water Research, April 9, 2014

ECAR (ElectroChemical Arsenic Removal) is a simple technology for removing arsenic from drinking water with a low-voltage electric current and iron electrodes. ECAR purifies water above WHO standards at a cost of about 0.08 cents per liter, and was tested in the field in West Bengal in 2012. In 2013, it was licensed by an Indian water company for further development.

== Documentaries ==
Ashok Gadgil is featured in Irena Salina's feature documentary Flow: For Love of Water (2008) and Michael Apted's award-winning 1999 documentary Me and Isaac Newton.

== Awards (Selected List) ==
- 2024, Bharat Asmita National Award for "Best use of Science and Technology through Innovation". Selected by an independent judges' panel chaired by Dr. R A Mashelkar, awarded by the MIT-WPU University, Pune, India. Three additional Laureates receiving this honor in different fields for 2024 are Dr. Rajendra Singh, Prof. G. Raghuram, and Vidushi Kaushiki Chakraborty.
- 2023, United States National Medal of Technology and Innovation, "for providing life-sustaining resources to communities around the world. His innovative, inexpensive technologies help meet profound needs from drinking water to fuel efficient cookstoves. His work is inspired by a belief in the dignity of all people and in our power to solve the great challenges of our time." The award is bestowed by the President of the United States on America's leading innovators, and is the nation's highest honor for technological achievement.
- 2023, R&D World's inaugural Award for "R&D Leader of the Year" for 2023. The award recognizes Gadgil as an exceptional research leader, with numerous technology inventions, excellence in mentoring of junior R&D scientists, and leadership of large complex R&D projects "
- 2023, Berkeley Lab Director's Award for Lifetime Achievement - The Berkeley Lab Prize. Citation reads "In recognition of Ashok Gadgil's exceptional career-long and unwavering commitment to create technological innovations for safe drinking water, clean air, sustainable energy, and reduced infant mortality that have profoundly benefitted the health and dignity of low-resource communities around the world "
- 2022, Director's Award from Berkeley Lab for Social Impact. For "design of the "DreamWarmer," an innovative, non-electric infant warmer that uniquely addresses the challenges of resource-limited settings and has been proven to reduce 'all-cause' infant mortality by a factor of three. "
- 2022, Inaugural Laureate of the Zuckerberg Water Prize for "outstanding leadership, vision, innovation, and lasting global impact in the field of Water."
- 2020, Honorable Mention, Patents for Humanity, United States Patent and Trademark Office, with Vi Rapp, for inventing an infant-warming device that uses a phase-change material to indicate temperature.
- 2017, Curry Stone Design Prize. Inducted in the "Social Design Honoree Circle" of honorees of the Curry Stone Foundation, for design under resource scarcity.
- 2016, R&D100 Award, R&D Magazine, for Sustainable and Affordable Fluoride Removal (SAFR) treatment of groundwater. The R&D100 Awards, called the "Oscars of Industrial Innovation", are an international annual competition and celebrate the 100 top technology advances of the past year.
- 2015, Leo Szilard Lectureship Award of the American Physical Society for "For applying physics to a variety of social problems and developing sustainable energy, environmental and public health technologies, as well as demonstrating how these could be scaled up, thus contributing to improved life for millions."
- 2015, Foreign fellow, Indian National Academy of Engineering (INAE)
- 2014, Inducted in National Inventors Hall of Fame
- 2013, Prince Sultan bin Abdulaziz International Prize for Water—Creativity category—team award
- 2013, Inducted in the US National Academy of Engineering
- 2013, Laureate (Economic Development), The Tech Awards, Team award for the Berkeley-Darfur Stove
- 2012, Lemelson-MIT Prize Award for Global Innovation
- 2012, Zayed Sustainability Prize Individual category
- 2011. European Inventor Award with Vikas Garud, European Patent Office, for UV water disinfection device
- 2009, The 15th Annual Heinz Award with special focus on the environment
- 2007, Breakthrough Award by Popular Mechanics—for Berkeley-Darfur Stove
- 2004. Laureate (Health), The Tech Awards, for UVWaterworks
- 2001, Fellow of the American Physical Society
- 1996, "Best of What's New" Award, Popular Science magazine, for UV Waterworks
- 1996, Discover Award, Discover magazine for UVWaterworks
- 1991, Pew Fellowship in Conservation and the Environment, The Pew Charitable Trusts
