= Annual Review of Environment and Resources =

- Discipline: Environmental science Environmental engineering
- Language: English
- Edited by: Arun Agrawal; Ashok Gadgil; Diana Ürge-Vorsatz

Publication details
- Former names: Annual Review of Energy; Annual Review of Energy and the Environment
- History: 1976–present
- Publisher: Annual Reviews (United States)
- Frequency: Annually
- Open access: Subscribe to Open
- License: Creative Commons
- Impact factor: 16.3 (2025)

Standard abbreviations
- ISO 4: Annu. Rev. Environ. Resour.

Indexing
- CODEN: ARENDD
- ISSN: 1543-5938 (print); 1545-2050 (web)
- LCCN: 2003213238
- OCLC no.: 1077820966

Links
- Journal homepage

The Annual Review of Environment and Resources is a peer-reviewed scientific journal that publishes review articles about environmental science and environmental engineering. It was first published in 1976 under the name the Annual Review of Energy. In 1991, the name was changed to the Annual Review of Energy and the Environment; it was again retitled in 2003 to the Annual Review of Environment and Resources. Beginning in 2020, it was published open access under the Subscribe to Open (S2O) publishing model.

== History ==
The first volume of the journal was published in 1976 under the title the Annual Review of Energy by Annual Reviews (AR), a nonprofit organization whose stated mission is to synthesize knowledge "for the progress of science and the benefit of society." One of the events that sparked its creation was the 1970s energy crisis. Unlike previous AR titles, its subject area was interdisciplinary and lacked a history of literature. The first volume covered the energy system of the United States, and the journal's first editor was Jack M. Hollander.

In 1991, the journal's name was changed to the Annual Review of Energy and the Environment. This was done in recognition that energy research and issues were interconnected with environmental issues. In 2003, the focus on the environment was further emphasized with an additional name change, to the Annual Review of Environment and Resources. Content published in the journal relates to environmental science and environmental engineering, such as ecology, conservation biology, energy development, hydrology, climate change, oceanography, and agriculture.

Under AR's Subscribe to Open publishing model, it was announced that the 2020 volume of Annual Review of Environment and Resources would be published open access, a first for the journal. As of 2020, it was published both in print and electronically.

== Abstracting and indexing ==
As of 2026, Journal Citation Reports gives the journal a 2025 impact factor of 16.3, ranking it third of 202 journals in the category "Environmental Studies (SSCI)" and eighth of 395 journals in the category "Environmental Science (SCIE)".

=== Editors of volumes ===
Dates indicate publication years in which someone was credited as a lead editor or co-editor of a journal volume. The planning process for a volume begins well before the volume appears, so appointment to the position of lead editor generally occurred prior to the first year shown here. An editor who has retired or died may be credited as a lead editor of a volume that they helped to plan, even if it is published after their retirement or death.

- Jack M. Hollander (1975–1992)
- Robert H. Socolow (1993–2002)
- Pamela Matson (2003–2008)
- Ashok Gadgil and Diana Liverman (2009–2014)
- Gadgil, Liverman and Thomas P. Tomich (2015)
- Gadgil & Tomich (2016–2026)
- Gadgil, Arun Agrawal, and Diana Ürge-Vorsatz
