= Jack Hollander =

American nuclear physicist (1927–2019)

- Born: April 13, 1927; Youngstown, Ohio
- Died: November 10, 2019 (aged 92); Berkeley, California
- Citizenship: US
- Education: Ohio State University; University of California, Berkeley
- Spouses: Margie Schnarr; Sharon Mann
- Children: 5
- Awards: Fellow of the American Association for the Advancement of Science and the American Physical Society
- Scientific career
- Thesis: Nuclear Transmutations Using Accelerated Carbon Ions (1951)
- Doctoral advisor: Glenn T. Seaborg

Jack Marvin Hollander (April 13, 1927 – November 10, 2019) was an American nuclear physicist. He held various positions in nuclear physics, energy, environmental research, and academic administration throughout his career. He was also the founding editor of the academic journal the Annual Review of Energy (now the Annual Review of Environment and Resources).

== Early life and education ==
Jack M. Hollander was born into a family of Eastern European Jewish immigrants on April 13, 1927, in Youngstown, Ohio. He was born to parents Adele née Feuer and Isadore Hollander, and had two older siblings, Maurice (born 1922) and Louise (born 1924). Isadore Hollander had immigrated from Hungary as a young child, and Adele Feuer had immigrated from Romania as a teenager; they met at a social at a Jewish center. Isadore was an accountant, and Adele was a volunteer nurse during World War I. Jack Hollander attended Ohio State University, graduating with a bachelor's degree in chemistry in 1948. He then attended the University of California, Berkeley, graduating with a PhD in nuclear chemistry in 1951.

== Career ==
In 1968, Hollander was one of the cofounders of the environmental research program at Lawrence Berkeley Laboratory. From 1973 to 1976, he was the first director of the lab's Energy and Environment Division. In 1980, he was a cofounder of the American Council for an Energy-Efficient Economy. From 1979 to 1983, he was the first director of the University of California Energy Institute. He was the chairperson of the Beijer Institute of Energy and Human Ecology from 1976 to 1988. He worked at Ohio State University as vice president for research and graduate studies from 1983 to 1989. He was the founding editor of the peer-reviewed journal the Annual Review of Energy, which was first published in 1976. He remained the editor until 1992.

== Awards and honors ==
Hollander received two Guggenheim Fellowships, both in the natural sciences category and the field of physics. The first was in 1958 and the second was in 1965. He was elected a fellow of American Association for the Advancement of Science in 1980 and the American Physical Society in 1987 "for founding and directing research programs on energy and the environment and for taking a leading role in the study of global energy resources and requirements".

== Personal life and death ==
Hollander's first wife was Margie Schnarr Hollander, with whom he had three children. He later married pianist Sharon Mann, the mother of his two stepchildren, on December 31, 1985. He died on November 10, 2019, in Berkeley, California, at the age of 92.
