= Organización Nacional de Mujeres Indígenas Andinas y Amazónicas del Perú =

Peruvian non-governmental organization

The Organización Nacional de Mujeres Indígenas Andinas y Amazónicas del Perú (ONAMIAP; translated as National Organization of Andean and Amazonian Indigenous Women of Peru) is a non-governmental organization founded in 2009 in Peru whch promotes the individual and collective rights of indigenous women, youth, and girls. It is composed of women's organizations and federations at the regional, provincial, and district levels, whose leaders have gained experience serving in roles within rondas campesinas (peasant patrols), the Vaso de Leche (Glass of Milk) program, community kitchens, and mothers' clubs, among other collective action groups.

The organization employs strategies to increase visibility and engage in political advocacy at the communal, regional, and national levels, aiming to improve the governance and sustainability of their territories through the participation of indigenous women. It also engages internationally, participating in United Nations Climate Change Conferences—specifically COP20 in Lima (2014) COP23 in Bonn (2017), COP27 in Egypt and COP30 in Belém.

Its activities also include promoting women's rights through the implementation of social projects, which encompass training sessions, newsletters, publications, and audiovisual materials.

The organization was founded in 2009; as of 2026 its president is Ketty Marcelo López.

== Social groups ==
The organization is made up of different grassroots peasant and indigenous organizations, which are:

Región	Comunidad	Groups
Loreto	Shiwilu people	Organización de Comunidades Indígenas de Mujeres Shiwilu - OCIDMUSHI
Cusco	Quechua people	Federación de Mujeres Campesinas de la Provincia de Anta - FEMCA
Piura	Quechua people	Asociación Distrital de Mujeres del Carmen de la Frontera - ADMUCAF
Cajamarca	Quechua people	Federación de Rondas Campesinas Femeninas del Norte del Perú - FEROCAFENOP
Ucayali	Asheninka	Federación de Mujeres Indígenas de la Provincia de Atalaya - FEMIPA
Ucayali	Shipibo-Conibo	Organización Regional de Mujeres Indígenas de la Región Ucayali - ORDEMI
Junín	Asháninka	Organización de Mujeres Indígenas Amazónicas Ashaninkas de la Selva Central - OMIAASEC
Ayacucho	Quechua people	Federación Regional de Mujeres Indígenas de Ayacucho - FEREMIA
Apurímac	Aymara people	Organización de Mujeres Originarias Aimaras del Collao Ilave -OMOACI
Puno	Quechua people	Asociación de Mujeres Centralizada, SUMAC TIKA.
Huancavelica	Quechua people	Federación de Mujeres de la Provincia de Angaraes, FEMUPA.
Apurímac	Quechua people	Federación Distrital de Mujeres de Cotabambas, FEDIMUC.

== Selected Publications ==
- Vergara Rodríguez, Roxana (2020). Mujeres y territorio. La lucha por el reconocimiento y la participación de las mujeres indígenas, andinas y amazónicas en el Perú. (Women and Territory: The Struggle for Recognition and Participation of Indigenous, Andean, and Amazonian Women in Peru) Lima: ONAMIAP, Oxfam América.
- Ketty Marcelo, Gladis Vila y los aportes de veintidós lideresas indígenas (Gladis Vila, and contributions from twenty-two Indigenous women leaders) (2016). Consulta previa en minería: Manual de capacitación para mujeres indígenas (Prior Consultation in Mining: A Training Manual for Indigenous Women). ONAMIAP, (GIZ) GmbH. Archived 20 February 2017.
