= Speeches of Greta Thunberg =

Speeches of Swedish activist

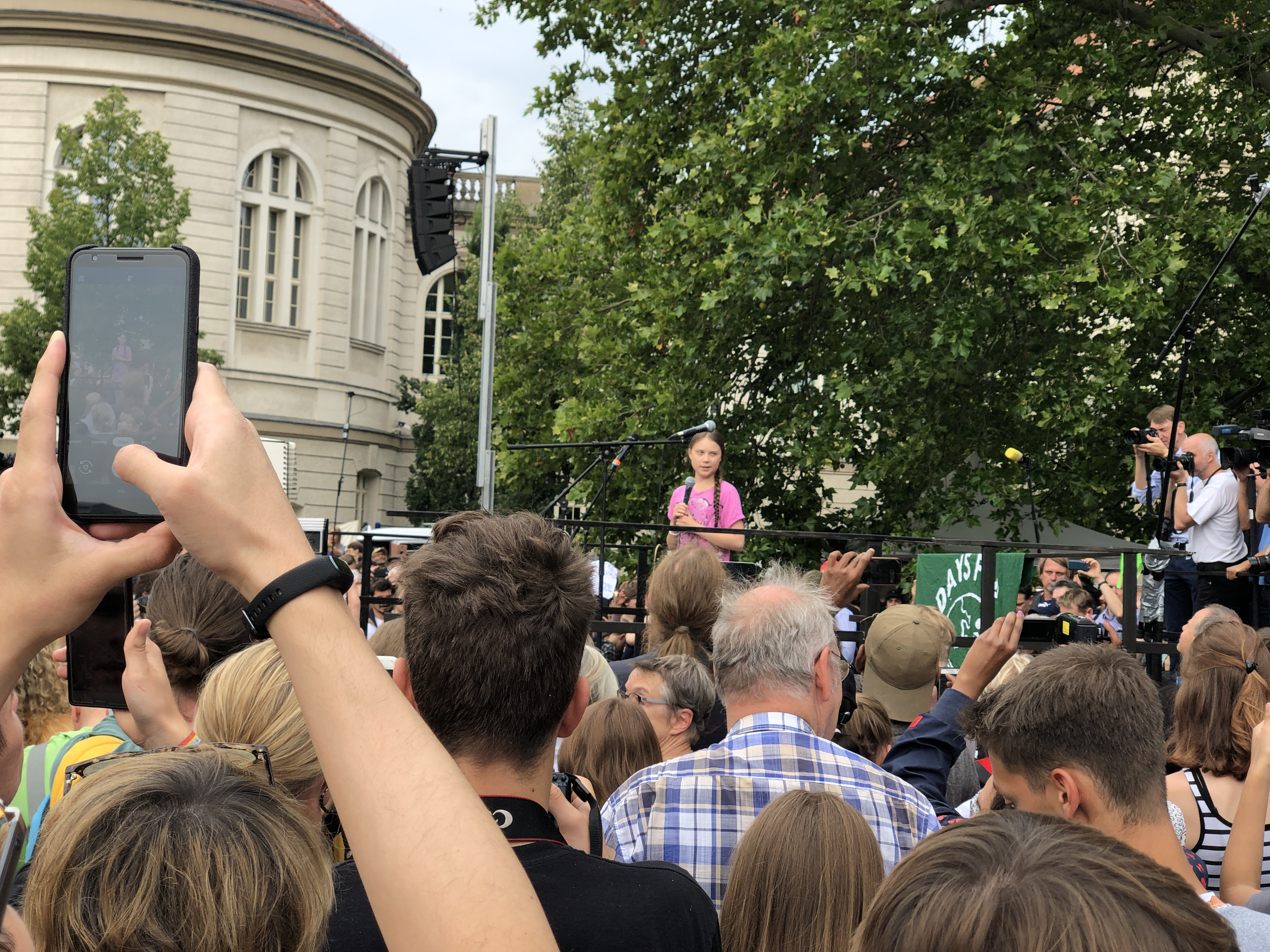
Greta Thunberg giving a speech in Berlin (July 2019)

Swedish climate activist Greta Thunberg has been noted for her skills as an orator. Her speech at the 2019 United Nations climate summit made her a household name. Prior to her speaking engagements, Thunberg had demonstrated outside the Swedish parliament, the Riksdag, using the signage Skolstrejk för klimatet (School strike for climate).

== List of speeches ==
=== November 2018: TEDxStockholm ===
On 24 November 2018, she spoke at TEDxStockholm. She spoke about realizing, when she was eight years old, that climate change existed and wondering why it was not headline news on every channel, as if there was a world war going on. She said she did not go to school to become a climate scientist, as some suggested, because the science was done and only denial, ignorance, and inaction remained. Speculating that her children and grandchildren would ask her why they had not taken action in 2018 when there was still time, she concluded with "we can't change the world by playing by the rules, because the rules have to be changed."

=== December 2018: COP24 ===
Thunberg addressed the COP24 United Nations climate change summit on 4 December 2018, and also spoke before the plenary assembly on 12 December 2018.

=== January 2019: World Economic Forum ===
Thunberg's speech "Our house is on fire" in Davos (January 2019)

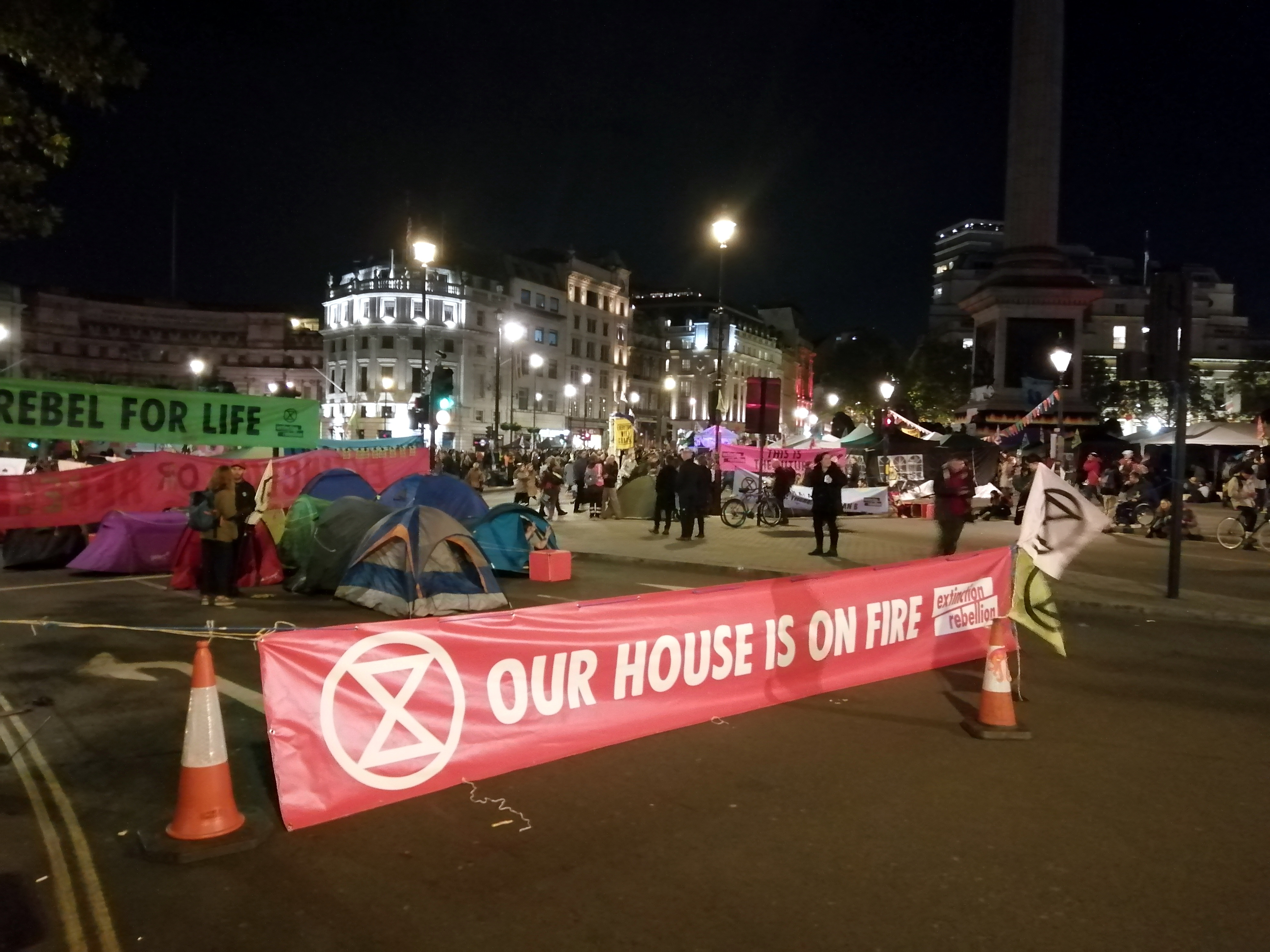
Extinction Rebellion banner citing Thunberg's speech "Our house is on fire" (London, October 2019)

On 25 January Thunberg gave a speech at the World Economic Forum in Davos. She warned the global leaders that "I don't want you to be hopeful. I want you to panic. I want you to feel the fear I feel every day. And then I want you to act. I want you to act as you would in a crisis. I want you to act as if the house was on fire—because it is". She has also stated that politicians and decision-makers need to listen to the scientists.

=== February 2019: European Economic and Social Committee ===
On 21 February 2019, she spoke at a conference of the European Economic and Social Committee and to European Commission chief Jean-Claude Juncker, where she said that to limit global warming to less than the two degrees C goal established at the Paris Agreement, the EU must reduce their CO_{2} emissions by 80% by 2030, double the 40% goal set in Paris. "If we fail to do so" she said, "all that will remain of our political leaders' legacy will be the greatest failure of human history."

=== March 2019: Brandenburg Gate ===
Thunberg speaking in front of the Brandenburg Gate on 29 March 2019

In the weekend 29–31 March 2019, Thunberg visited Berlin. She spoke in front of some 25,000 people near the Brandenburg Gate on 29 March, where she argued that "We live in a strange world where children must sacrifice their own education in order to protest against the destruction of their future. Where the people who have contributed the least to this crisis are the ones who are going to be affected the most." On 30 March, Thunberg received the 'Golden Camera' Special Award on Germany's annual film and television award show. In her acceptance speech at the gala, Thunberg urged celebrities everywhere to use their influence and do their fair share of climate activism to help her.

=== April 2019: European Parliament ===
At an April 2019 meeting at the European Parliament in Strasbourg with MEPs and EU officials, Thunberg chided those present "for three emergency Brexit summits and no emergency summit regarding the breakdown of the climate and the environment". Climate change discussions have not been dominant at EU summits because other issues have taken precedence. She said the world is facing its "sixth mass extinction" and said: "We have not treated this crisis as a crisis; we see it as another problem that needs to be fixed. But it is so much more than that. It’s an existential crisis, more important than anything else."

=== April 2019: British Parliament ===
On 23 April 2019 in a speech in the British Parliament in Westminster, Thunberg told MPs "You don’t listen to the science because you are only interested in solutions that will enable you to carry on like before. Like now. And those answers don’t exist any more. Because you did not act in time." Several times in her speech she asked whether her microphone was on: "Did you hear what I just said? Is my English OK? Is the microphone on? Because I’m beginning to wonder."

=== May 2019: Austrian World Summit R20 ===
In May 2019, Thunberg met with Arnold Schwarzenegger, United Nations Secretary-General António Guterres, and Austrian President Alexander Van der Bellen at the launch of a conference organised by Schwarzenegger to speed up progress toward the Paris Agreement. Quoting the most recent IPCC report she said: "If we haven't made the changes required by approximately the year 2030, we will probably set off an irreversible chain reaction beyond human control. Then we will pass a point of no return which will be catastrophic." 17,000 people attended the event from 30 different countries.

=== July 2019: Normandy's Freedom Prize Effort ===
On 21 July 2019, Thunberg received the Normandy's Freedom Prize. In her speech she said: "Yesterday I spent the day with the D-Day veteran Charles Norman Shay at Omaha Beach. It was a day I will never forget, not only because of the unimaginable bravery and sacrifices made by those who gave their lives to defend the freedom and democracy of the world, but also because they managed to make the seemingly impossible possible. I think the least we can do to honour them is to stop destroying that same world that Charles, Léon and their friends and colleagues fought so hard to save for us."

=== 20 September 2019: Global Climate Strike (New York City) ===
On 20 September 2019, Thunberg spoke to New York City's contingent of the Global Climate Strike. The demonstration in New York City was one of hundreds around the world with millions of people taking part. Young people were joined by adults for the first time since the strikes began. Thunberg drew laughter when she described how the politicians that she met asked her for selfies and "tell us they really, really admire what we do yet have done nothing to address the climate crisis."

=== 23 September 2019: United Nations Climate Action Summit – "How dare you!" ===
On 23 September 2019, Thunberg addressed the assembled world leaders at the 2019 UN Climate Action Summit held in New York City. Accusing world leaders of stealing her dreams and her childhood by their inaction on climate change, she opened her speech to the General Assembly with an impassioned introduction, which was widely covered by the media.

"This is all wrong. I shouldn’t be up here. I should be back in school on the other side of the ocean. Yet you all come to us young people for hope? How dare you! You have stolen my dreams and my childhood with your empty words. And yet I’m one of the lucky ones. People are suffering. People are dying. Entire ecosystems are collapsing. We are in the beginning of a mass extinction. And all you can talk about is money and fairytales of eternal economic growth. How dare you!" "You are failing us... But the young people are starting to understand your betrayal. The eyes of all future generations are upon you. And if you choose to fail us, I say: We will never forgive you."

Philosopher Peter Singer wrote that Thunberg's speech was "the most powerful four-minute speech I have ever heard." An analysis of the speech shows what made it such effective oratory.

US president Donald Trump, who had attended the meeting for 10 minutes and then left, tweeted a video of her opening remarks and commented: "She seems like a very happy young girl looking forward to a bright and wonderful future. So nice to see!" Thunberg did not directly comment on Trump's tweet, but she changed her Twitter bio, describing herself as "A very happy young girl looking forward to a bright and wonderful future."

The speech was incorporated in various musical performances. In September 2019, John Meredith set the speech to death metal. The Australian musician Megan Washington and composer Robert Davidson used the same "how dare you" speech, for a performance at an event exploring the future of music. DJ Fatboy Slim created a mashup of this speech with his dance hit "Right Here, Right Now".

=== 27 September 2019: Global Climate Strike (Montreal) ===
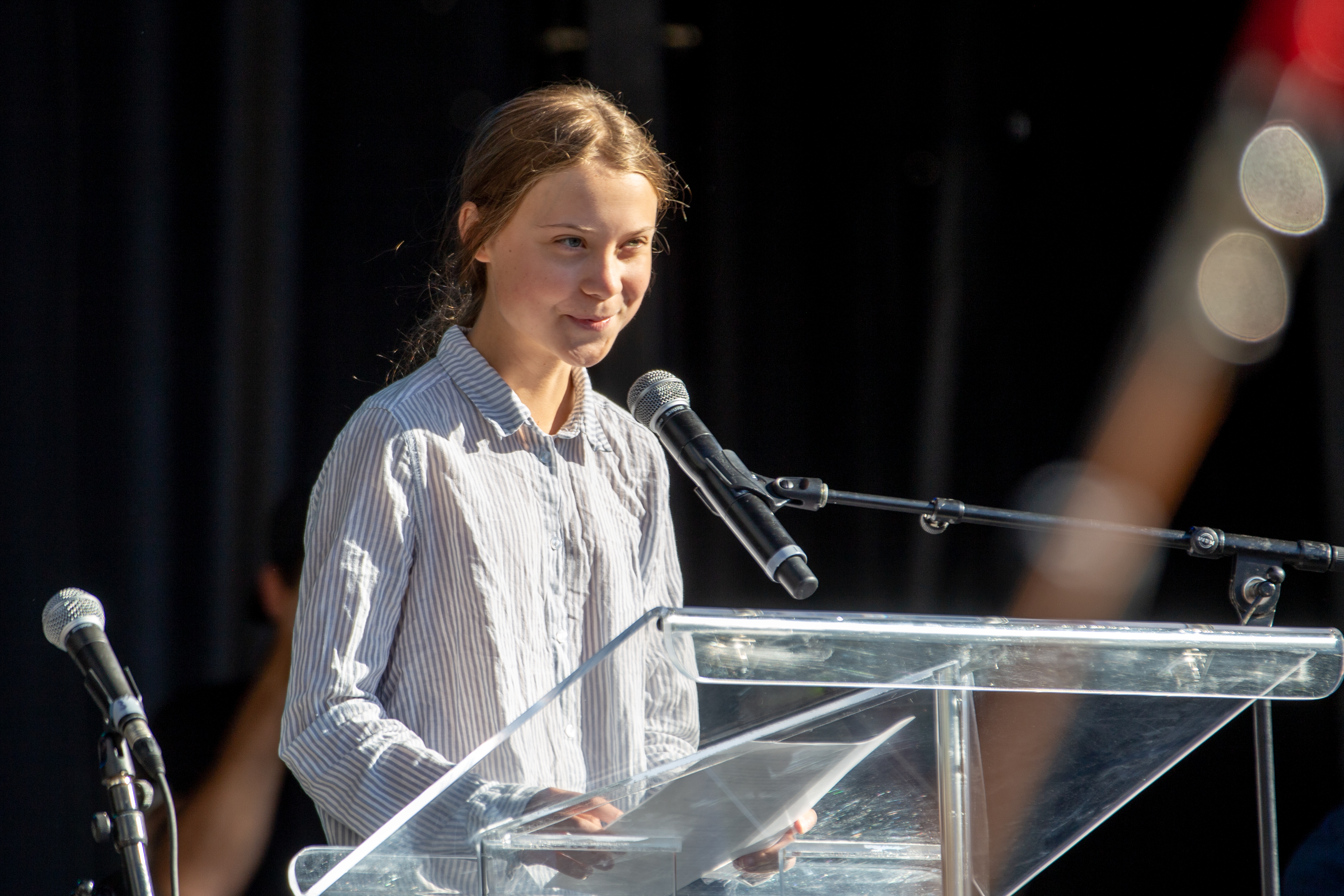
Greta Thunberg speaking at the Climate March in Montreal (Canada)

On 27 September 2019, Thunberg was in Montreal, Canada, for its Global Climate Strike. Following a press conference, Thunberg joined First Nations Indigenous people and together they led the climate march. After the marchers gathered at the main stage, Thunberg delivered a speech in English and French. Thunberg told Montreal marchers that the fight against climate change will not stop until world leaders take the problem seriously.

=== 11 December 2019: COP25 United Nations Climate Conference (Madrid, Spain) ===
On 11 December 2019, Thunberg addressed the COP25. In part, she stated: "For about a year I have been constantly talking about our rapidly declining carbon budgets over and over again. But since that is still being ignored, I will just keep repeating it."

=== 28 September 2021: 2021 United Nations Climate Change pre-Conference ===
On 28 September 2021, Thunberg gave a speech at the opening session of a Youth4Climate event at the UN Climate Change pre-Conference preceding COP26 held in Milan, Italy. She said that there had been "thirty years of blah, blah, blah ... So-called leaders have cherry picked young people to meetings like this to pretend they are listening to us, but they are not listening ... There is no planet B ... Change is not only possible but necessary, but not if we go on like we have until today."

=== 5 November 2021: Climate Strike in Glasgow ===
On 5 November 2021, Thunberg gave a speech during the 2021 United Nations Climate Change Conference held in Glasgow. She criticised world leaders for allowing the "exploitation of people and nature ... They are actively creating loopholes, shaping frameworks to benefit themselves to continue profiting from this destructive system". She said that COP26 was "turning into a greenwash campaign, a PR campaign" to pretend, without actually doing anything, that business and political leaders were acting on global warming. She described what was taking place, as she had done for previous meetings, as "blah blah blah", and characterised COP26 as a failure.
