= Freedom Radio Nigeria =

Group of radio stations in Northern Nigeria

- Kano; Nigeria
- Broadcast area: Northern Nigeria
- Frequencies: 99.5 MHz (Kano); 99.5 MHz (Dutse); 92.9 MHz (Kaduna)

Programming
- Languages: English and Hausa

Ownership
- Owner: The Dalhatu Family
- Sister stations: Dala FM (88.5 MHz) Kano

History
- First air date: 2002
- Former names: Savannah Radio (2002–2003)

Links
- Website: freedomradionig.com

Freedom Radio Nigeria is a group of radio stations in Northern Nigeria. The station is headquartered in Kano State. There are three Freedom-branded stations, in Kano (99.5 FM), Dutse (99.5 FM), and Kaduna (92.9 FM), and a second station in Kano, and Dala FM (88.5 MHz). Freedom Radio Nigeria is owned by The Dalhatu family.

== History ==
In 2002, Freedom Radio Kano was licensed from Film Laboratory and Production Services Limited to establish the first private radio station of its kind in northern Nigeria at the time with the name Savannah Radio Kano. On 1 December 2003, the station began broadcasting under its current name.

Branching out from the Kano station, Freedom Radio added a second outlet in 2007 with the launch of Freedom Radio Dutse in Jigawa State. In 2011, the station was licensed to open more stations in Kano, Sokoto, Kaduna, and Maiduguri. In 2011, Dala FM 88.5 was launched in Kano, and in 2012, Freedom Radio Kaduna 92.9 was launched.
