= Catarina Lorenzo =

Brazilian climate activist (born 2007)

- Born: March 30, 2007 (age 19); Salvador, Bahia

Catarina Lorenzo (born March 30, 2007) is a Brazilian climate activist from Salvador, Bahia.

== Early life ==
Lorenzo was born to parents and grandparents also engaged in environmental justice activism. She grew up participating in strikes for the protections of rivers and forests and surfing.

== Activism ==
On September 23, 2019, she and 15 other children including Greta Thunberg, Alexandria Villaseñor, Ayakha Melithafa, and Carl Smith filed a complaint before the United Nations Committee on the Rights of the Child to protest lack of government action on the climate crisis. In particular, the complaint alleges that five countries, namely Argentina, Brazil, France, Germany, and Turkey, have failed to live up to their Paris Agreement pledges.

She recently joined Greenkingdom, an International Youth led Intersectional Environmental movement, where she works as the coordinator for the movement's Brazilian chapter. Now she has teamed up with an Indian based 14-year-old Environmentalist and climate activist Sameer Yasin who is founder of the youth movement.
