= RRI Rhein Ruhr International =

German engineering company

RRI GmbH Rhein Ruhr International – Consulting Engineers
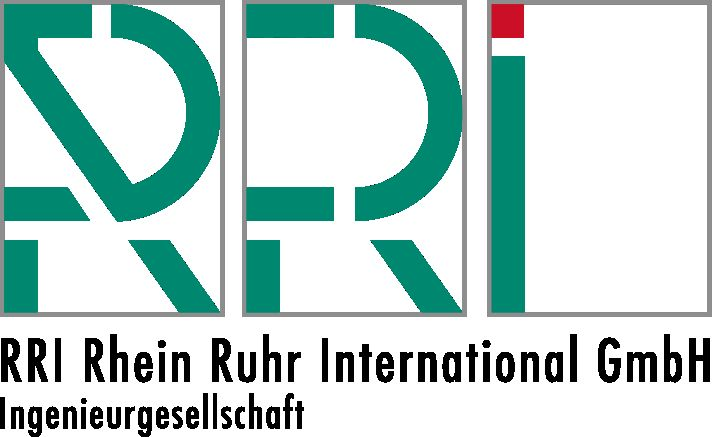
- Type: GmbH
- Industry: Construction, engineering, project management
- Founded: 1942 as Stahl-Union Ingenieurbau GmbH
- Headquarters: Essen, Germany
- Area served: Worldwide
- Key people: Wolfgang Riederauer
- Products: Consulting, engineering, project management, risk management and EPCM services for industry, infrastructure and real estate
- Website: http://rri-gmbh.com/

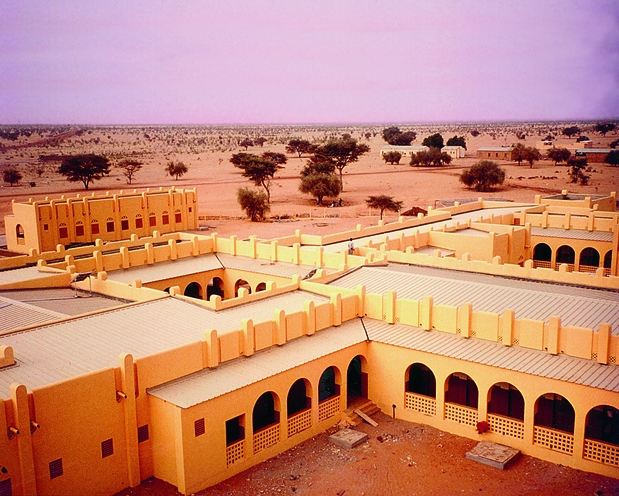
Hospital in Mali, West Africa

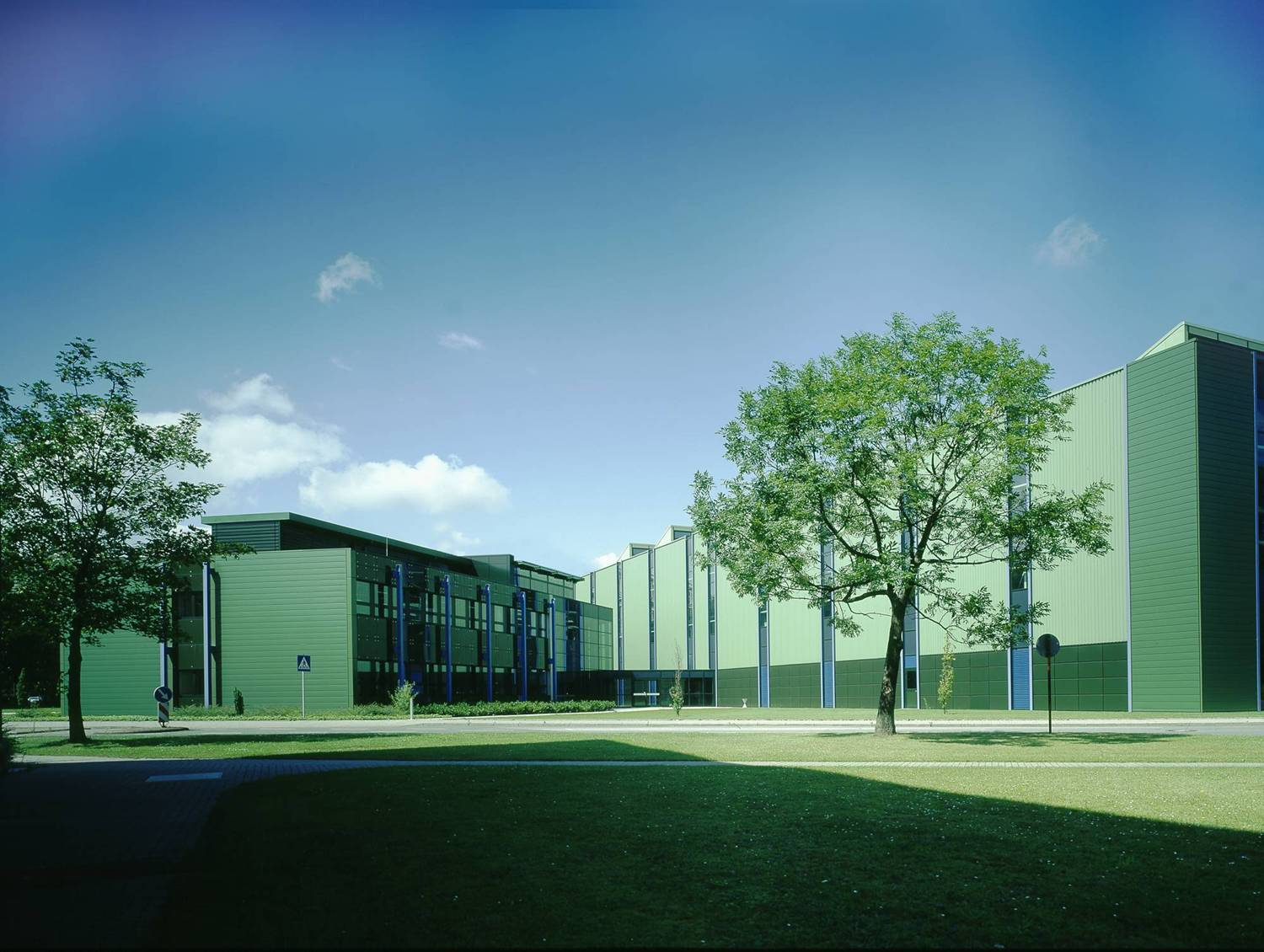
Hot-Dip Galvanizing Line, Germany

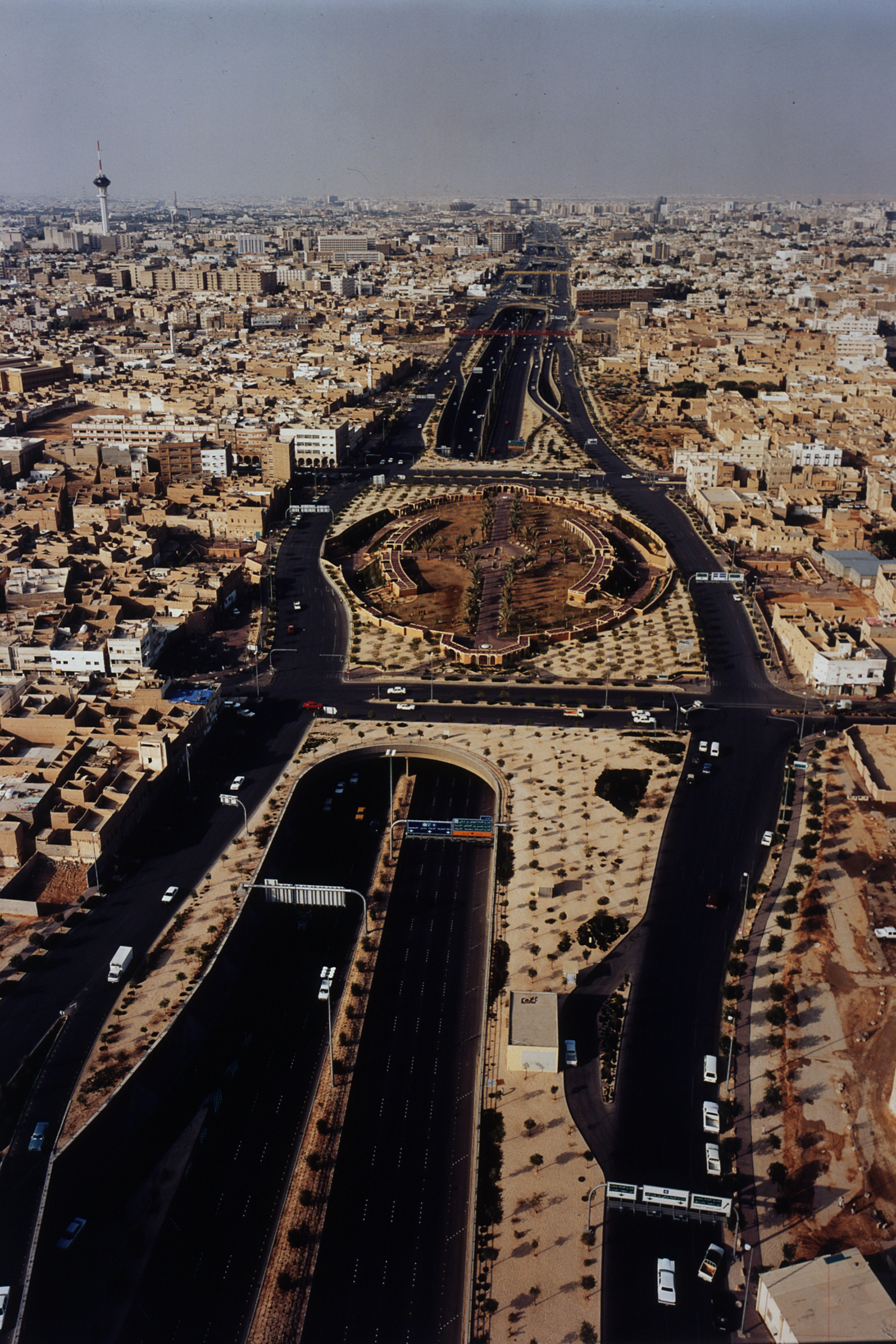
Urban Highway in Riyadh, Saudi Arabia

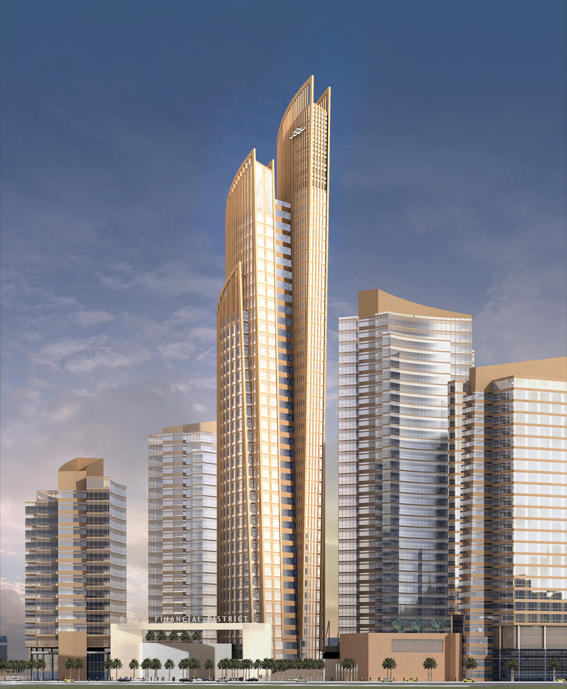
Office and Hotel Complex in Qatar

RRI GmbH Rhein Ruhr International – Consulting Engineers is an engineering company located in Essen, Germany. RRI is active in the fields of consulting, engineering, project management, risk management and EPCM services for industrial and public projects, both at the national and international level. Its business areas had been industry, infrastructure and real estate. In April 2014, RRI has restructured business and gained a new investor for its business – AMR GmbH in Essen, Germany (Engineering Company). Management and Business Units maintain the same.

== History ==
RRI GmbH Rhein Ruhr International – Consulting Engineers was founded by today's ThyssenKrupp Steel AG in 1942 in Dortmund, Germany, as ”Stahl-Union Ingenieurbau GmbH“.

In 1965 the first international project, a cotton factory in Iraq, was realized. Since that time, RRI has permanently implemented industrial and institutional projects worldwide.

In 1966 the company was renamed in Rhein-Ruhr Ingenieurgesellschaft mbH.

Since 2003 the restructured company has been named RRI Rhein Ruhr International GmbH.

Since April 2014 the restructured company operates under the name RRI GmbH Rhein Ruhr International – Consulting Engineers.

RRI is certified according to DIN ISO 9001

In addition, RRI meets the strict requirements of the IAEA 50-C-Q Code on Quality Assurance for Safety in Nuclear Power Plants.

RRI is a long-standing member of the German Association of Consulting Engineers VBI.

As an international consultant, RRI has made the principles of the United Nations Global Compact initiative an integral part of its corporate philosophy.

== Business Areas ==
RRI accompanies the implementation of industrial facilities and plants and of technical and social infrastructure projects.

International projects mostly cover regions in Europe, Africa, the CIS Region, the Middle East and the United States.

Business Areas are:

- Industry: In the broad field of production and consumer goods industry RRI develops ideas and concepts. Core competences are
  - Steel Industry: RRI is a consultant and engineer for different types of production units and systems as well as for complete iron and steel production and steel processing plants.
  - Industrial Buildings: In the area of industrial construction RRI provides interdisciplinary general engineering as well as industrial services.
  - Plant Engineering: RRI's services range from concept up to execution super-vision of mechanical systems, operational infrastructure, auxiliary facilities as well as media systems for industrial plants.
- Infrastructure: RRI's consulting and engineering services range from supply and disposal facilities to the transport infrastructure and the development of industrial estates.
  - Traffic Infrastructure: Roads and rails traffic as well as port facilities and airports.
  - Engineering Structures: Bridges, dams, tunnels or steel construction for hydraulic engineering.
  - Technical Infrastructure: RRI plans supply and disposal facilities for public and industrial projects. This includes power supply and distribution, water supply, sewage disposal as well as media systems.
- Real Estate: Commercial and social infrastructure facilities like office and hotel complexes, residential housing, sports and leisure facilities, hospitals and nursing homes.
  - Architecture and Buildings: Architectural design and engineering.
  - Area Development: Urban and rural development, industrial parks as well as residential areas.
  - Hospitals: Further to new buildings, expansions or rehabilitations of hospitals and medicine-technical equipment implementation.

== Major Projects ==
- Project Management for the construction of a candy factory in Russia for Ferrero Rocher in cooperation with Hochtief AG
- Water Towers in Saudi Arabia
- Highway 54 in Saudi Arabia
- Urban Highway in Saudi Arabia
- German Embassy in Saudi Arabia
- Office and Hotel Complex in Barwa Financial District in Qatar
- Housing Complex in Russia and in Saudi Arabia
- In 2004 the President of Germany, Horst Köhler, inaugurated the Konrad-Adenauer-Bridge in Benin, (Africa). RRI was responsible for consulting, planning and construction supervision. General Contractor was DYWIDAG International GmbH
- RRI Rhein Ruhr International GmbH planned the Willy-Brandt-Bridge in Benin (Africa), which was finished in January 2009. The bottleneck in Cotonou could be eliminated through the bridge.
- Hospital in Mali
- All infrastructures on an EPCM basis for the Ferro Alloy Plant Kazchrome in Kazakhstan
- All infrastructure engineering and construction supervision for the CSP Plant SeverStal in Russia
- Complete basic design, master plan and as-built for the new Alabama stainless and carbon steel facilities ThyssenKrupp in the USA
