= Central African Forest Initiative =

The Central African Forest Initiative (CAFI) was launched during the 2015 United Nations General Assembly in New York as a collaborative partnership between a coalition of willing donors, six Central African partner countries (Central African Republic, the Democratic Republic of the Congo, the Republic of Cameroon, the Republic of Congo, the Republic of Equatorial Guinea and the Gabonese Republic), and Brazil as South-South partner. The donor pool has grown to reach 10 contributing donors by end 2024.

CAFI's goals are to "recognize and preserve the value of the forests in the region to mitigate climate change, reduce poverty, and contribute to sustainable development". These goals will be attained through the implementation of country-led, national scale, holistic reducing emissions from deforestation and forest degradation (REDD+) and low emissions development national investment frameworks (NIFs) which will include policy reforms and other tangible measures to address the drivers of deforestation and forest degradation and promote sustainable development.

The rationale for establishing CAFI is that while Central Africa is home to the second-largest tropical rainforest in the world, after the Amazon Basin, ongoing efforts have not prevented forest loss. The land use and forestry sector is by far the main contributor to greenhouse gas (GHG) emissions in the region. International investments in REDD+ are not currently at the required scale to affect the necessary change, and donor support in the region has been traditionally fragmented.

== Challenges and solutions ==
The four main direct drivers and their dynamics in the Central African forests are widely recognized: agriculture, wood energy, forestry and infrastructure/mining development. Indirect drivers include rural and urban demographic pressure, weak and inadequate land use planning and land tenure rules, the development of new infrastructure, and inadequate governance. CAFI will seek to support country-led NIFs that tackle one or several drivers at different levels (national and sub-national) to result in, for example:

- Sustainable agricultural practices towards less land conversion and increased food security;
- Sustainable alternatives to current wood energy practices;
- Forestry sector institutions that have the capacity and the legal framework to promote, monitor and enforce sustainable forest management;
- Future infrastructure and mining projects that minimize their overall footprint;
- Land use planning decisions that ensure a balanced representation of sectoral interests and keep forests standing, and better tenure security that does not incentivize conversion by individuals or communities;
- Slower population growth and migration to forests and forest fronts;
- Better inter-ministerial coordination and governance resulting in permitting and fiscal regime of economic activities that do not push economic actors to forest conversion and illegal activities.

To mitigate the economic impact of the initiative, funds are also dedicated to reducing poverty and creating sustainable development.

== Governance ==
The CAFI Executive Board is the entity through which funding allocation decisions are made to support country-driven National Investment Frameworks.

The CAFI Multi-Partner Trust Fund is the principal means of implementing the Central African Forest Initiative. Its initial capitalization target is US$500 million over the 2015–2025 period.

The CAFI Secretariat supports the Executive Board, coordinates with CAFI Partner Countries and is responsible for decisions regarding the allocation of resources from the CAFI Fund.
