= Energy Studies Institute =

Research Institution in Singapore

- Established: 12 November 2007; 17 years ago
- Chair: Ng How Yue
- Location: 29 Heng Mui Keng Terrace, Singapore 119620, Singapore
- Coordinates: 1.2906°N 103.7755°E
- Website: esi.nus.edu.sg

The Energy Studies Institute (ESI) is an independent research institute within the National University of Singapore. The ESI's research and analyses focus on the areas of Energy Economics, Energy Security and Energy and the Environment.
