= Alexandria Villaseñor =

American climate activist (born 2005)

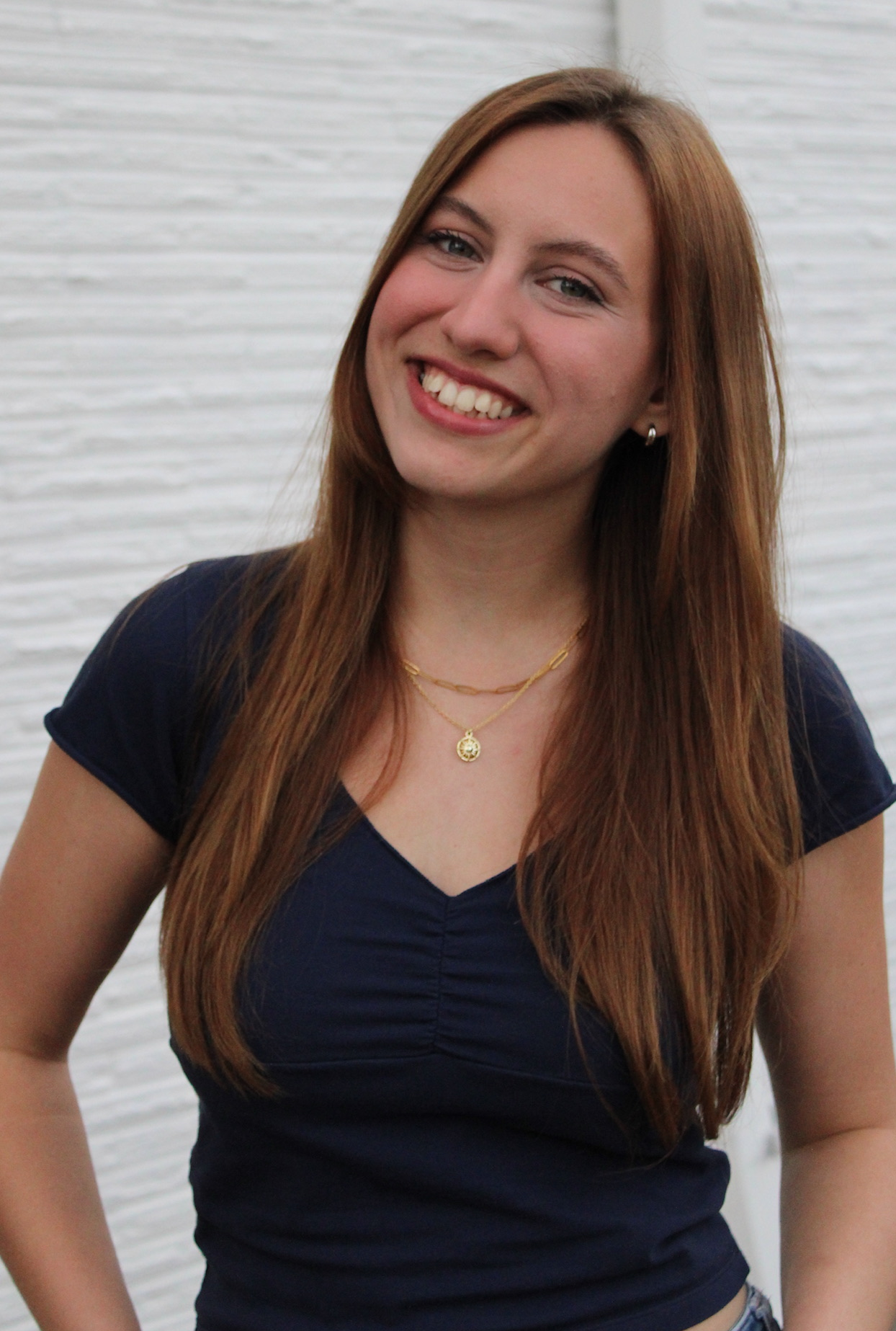
- Villaseñor in March 2024
- Born: May 18, 2005 (age 21); Davis, California, U.S.
- Occupations: Student; Environmental activist
- Known for: School Strike for Climate

Alexandria Villaseñor (born May 18, 2005) is an American climate activist living in New York. A follower of the Fridays for Future movement and fellow climate activist Greta Thunberg, Villaseñor is a co-founder of U.S. Youth Climate Strike and the founder of Earth Uprising.

== Early life and education ==
Villaseñor was born on May 18, 2005, in Davis, California, where she grew up. The family moved from northern California to New York in 2018. Villaseñor is Latina (of Mexican heritage). Her ambition is to work for the United Nations.

Villaseñor graduated high school in May 2024. She started studying at Harvard University in the fall of 2024 and is a member of the Class of 2028.

== Activism ==
Villaseñor's fight for climate action was sparked when she was caught in a smoke cloud from the November 2018 Camp Fire in California, the deadliest and most destructive wildfire in California's history, while visiting her hometown for Thanksgiving. As an asthma sufferer, she became physically ill, during which time she researched the climate change and temperature rises which contributed to the fire's severity. Her mother, Kristin Hogue, was enrolled in the M.A. in Climate and Society program at Columbia University and Villaseñor would occasionally attend class with her mother, where she learned about the underlying science of climate change. Soon afterward, she joined New York's chapter of Zero Hour, a group of American youth climate activists.

Villaseñor has taken similar climate action to Thunberg, who inspired her with her December 4, 2018, talk at the United Nations Climate Change Conference (COP24) in Katowice, Poland. Since December 14, 2018 (while COP24 was still held), Villaseñor skips school every Friday in order to protest against lack of climate action in front of the Headquarters of the United Nations in New York. She is no longer involved with the US Youth Climate Strike group and founded the climate change education group Earth Uprising.

When Thunberg arrived in New York City from her transatlantic sailboat voyage in August 2019, Villaseñor, Xiye Bastida, and other climate activists greeted Thunberg upon arrival. By that time, they had already established contact with each other over social media.

In September 2019, she spoke at the Global Citizen Festival in New York along with Bastida and Selina Neirok Leem.

In mid-October 2019, she attended the C40 World Mayors Summit in Copenhagen, Denmark.

In mid-January 2020, she attended the World Economic Forum as a youth speaker and then participated in the School Strike for Climate in Davos, Switzerland alongside Thunberg on January 24, 2020.

=== Climate change lawsuits ===
On September 23, 2019, Villaseñor, along with 15 other youth activists including Greta Thunberg, Catarina Lorenzo, Ayakha Melithafa, and Carl Smith, filed a legal complaint with the United Nations accusing five countries, namely France, Germany, Brazil, Argentina, and Turkey of violating their rights under the United Nations Convention on the Rights of the Child by failing to uphold their reduction targets, to which they committed in their Paris Agreement pledges, and failing to encourage the world’s biggest emitters to curb carbon pollution.

=== Earth Uprising ===
Villaseñor saw a need to provide more support and education to the global youth climate movement, prompting her to found Earth Uprising International on April 22, 2019. Earth Uprising International is a global nonprofit organization that focuses on climate education and youth mobilization to empower grassroots change from the local level upward.

=== Political engagement ===
On August 19, 2020, Villaseñor addressed the Democratic National Convention as part of their segment on climate change.

== Awards and recognition ==
In May 2019, Villaseñor was the recipient of the Disruptor Award from the Tribeca Disruptive Innovation Awards (TDIA), received a scholarship from the Common Good public advocacy organization, and was awarded a Youth Climate Leadership prize from Earth Day Network.

On December 1, 2020, she was named by Seventeen magazine as one of their 2020 Voices of the Year.
