= International Forestry Resources and Institutions =

Forestry research collective

The International Forestry Resources and Institutions (IFRI) Network is a collective of research partners at 12 universities or non-governmental organizations in 11 countries around the world that focus on how institutions and governance arrangements shape forest use and management outcomes. Scholars and policy makers affiliated with IFRI are interested in understanding the role of formal and informal institutions in enhancing livelihoods and adaptive capacity of peoples, conserving biodiversity, and promoting greater sustainability in carbon sequestration. IFRI's goal is to carry out rigorous research that can help policy makers and forest users design and implement improved evidence-based forest policies. IFRI comprises partner collaborating research institutes in North America, Latin America, Asia and Africa. IFRI utilizes the Institutional Analysis and Development (IAD) framework, created at the Workshop in Political Theory and Policy Analysis at Indiana University by Elinor Ostrom and her colleagues.

The IFRI research program was initiated in 1992 at Indiana University. It moved in 2006 to University of Michigan where it is currently housed at the School of Natural Resources and Environment and coordinated by Arun Agrawal.

== Collaborating Resource Centers ==
In addition to Indiana University and the University of Michigan, the following institutions are partners in the program:

- Bolivia – Center for the Study of Economic and Social Reality (1993)
- Uganda – Makerere University (1993)
- Kenya – Kenya Forestry Research Institute (1997)
- Tanzania – Sokoine University of Agriculture (1998)
- Thailand – Asian Institute of Technology (1999)
- India – Institute for Research and Development, Nagpur (2000)
- Mexico – National Autonomous University of Mexico (2000)
- Nepal – ForestAction (2001)
- Guatemala – Universidad del Valle de Guatemala (2002)
- Colombia – Pontifical Xavierian University and the Alexander von Humboldt Biological Resources Research Institute

== Goals ==
Some of the goals of the IFRI network are to:

- determine how to change processes leading to deforestation in many countries of the world;
- assess the nature of tradeoffs among forest conservation, livelihoods promotion, and carbon sequestration
- analyze the role of institutions and policies in promoting better forest outcomes

IFRI provides a way for people to collect, store, and analyze data over time about forests and the communities that use forests. It can be used to:

- conduct baseline studies;
- measure change over time in forest conditions and in local governance structures; and
- share information with pertinent and interested colleagues.

The IFRI is unique from other research programs and databases in that:

- it is composed of a network of Collaborating Research Centers (CRCs) that utilize a common research methodology and database that includes a diverse array of variables taken from the environmental and social sciences;
- the design of the IFRI research instruments is based on the Institutional Analysis and Development (IAD) framework and previous theoretical and empirical studies. The IAD framework, developed by colleagues at the Workshop in Political Theory and Policy Analysis at Indiana University, provides a unique way for researchers to transcend disciplinary boundaries;
- IFRI focuses and collects data on institutional, social, and ecological variables which can be stored in a single IFRI database, and analyzed to understand the inter-relationships among social and ecological processes and outcomes.
