= Gaza Solidarity Encampment (Columbia University) =

2024 United States protest

- Part of Gaza war protests (in the US at universities (in 2024 (in the US (at Columbia))))
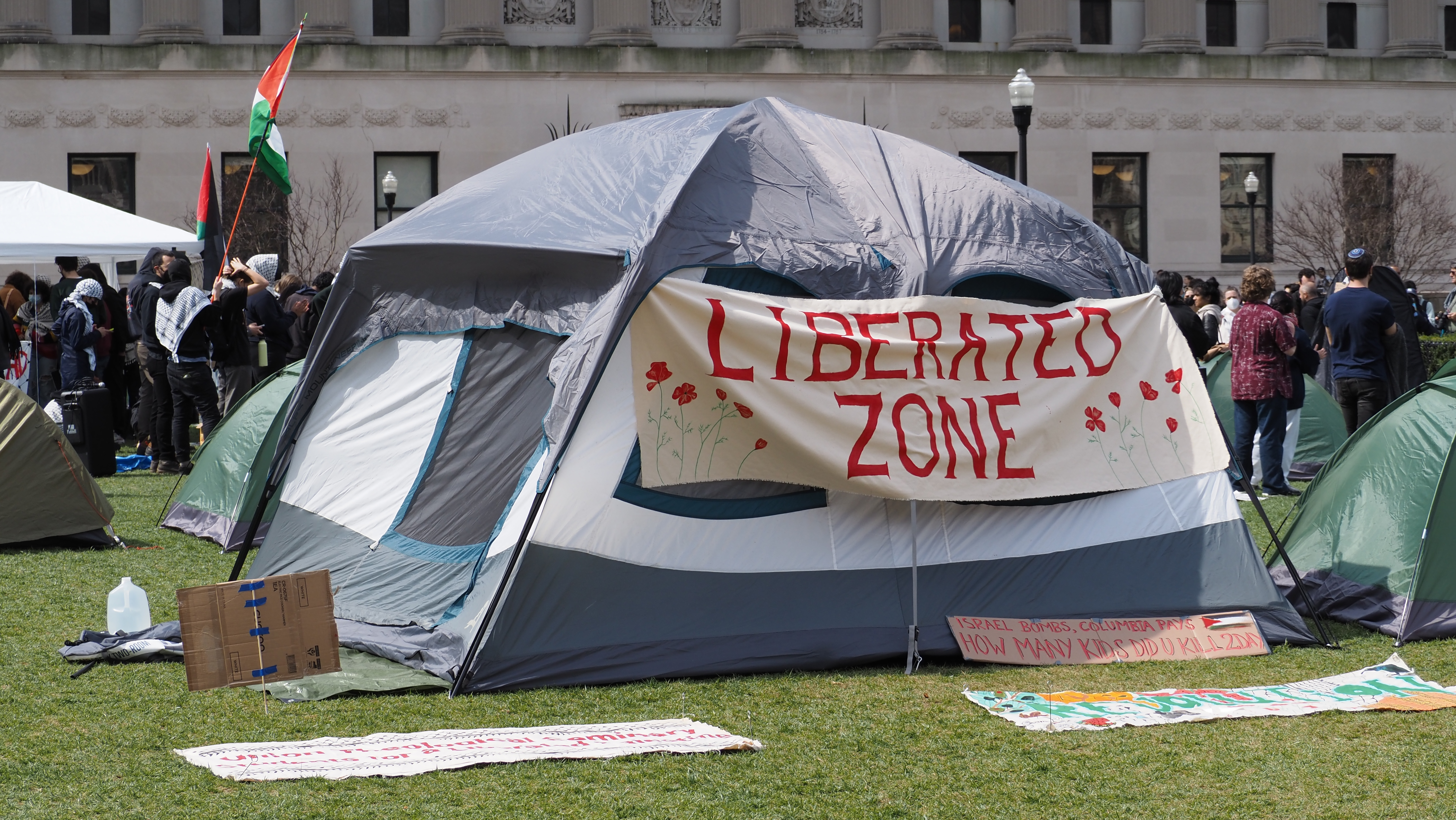
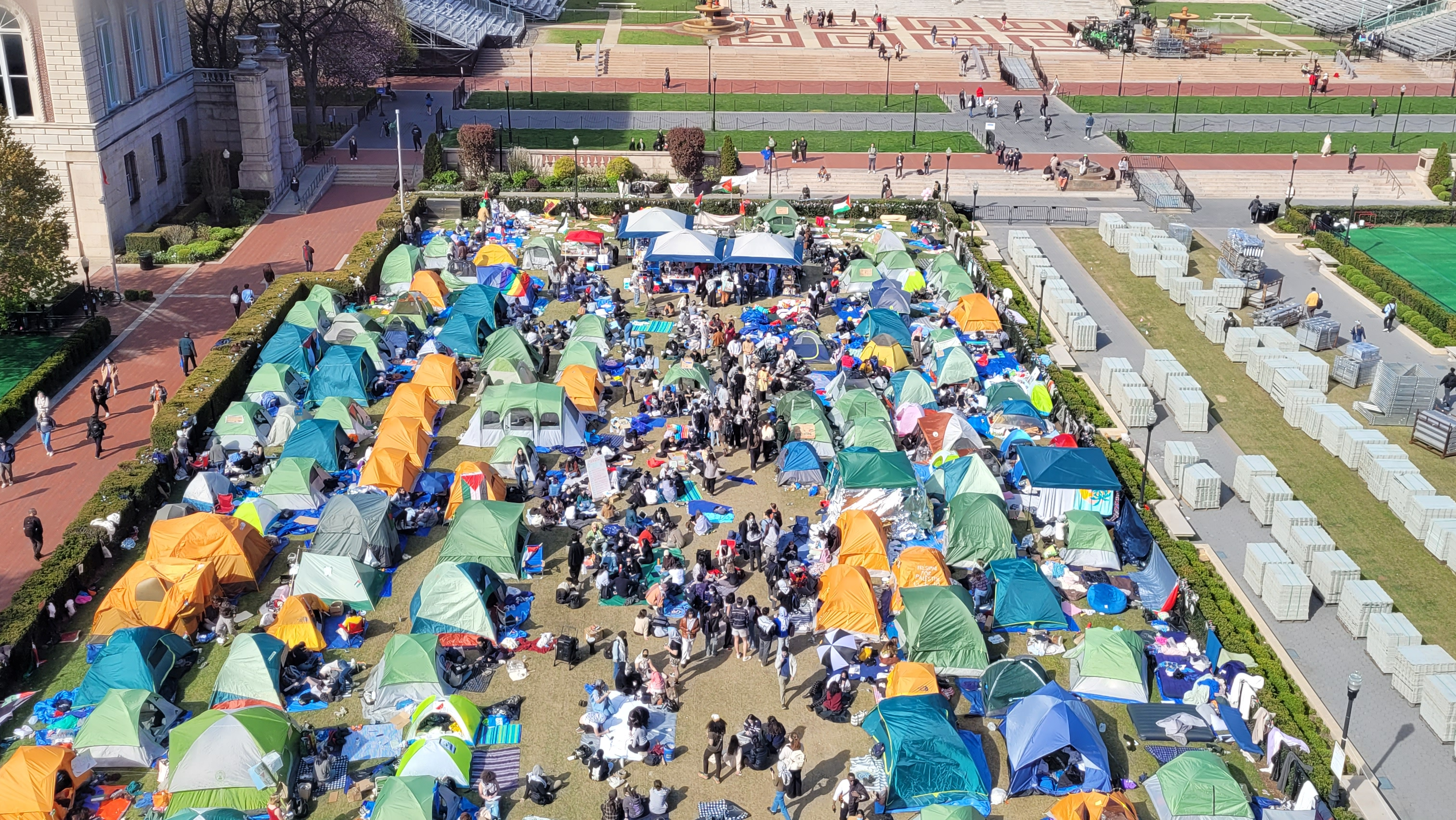
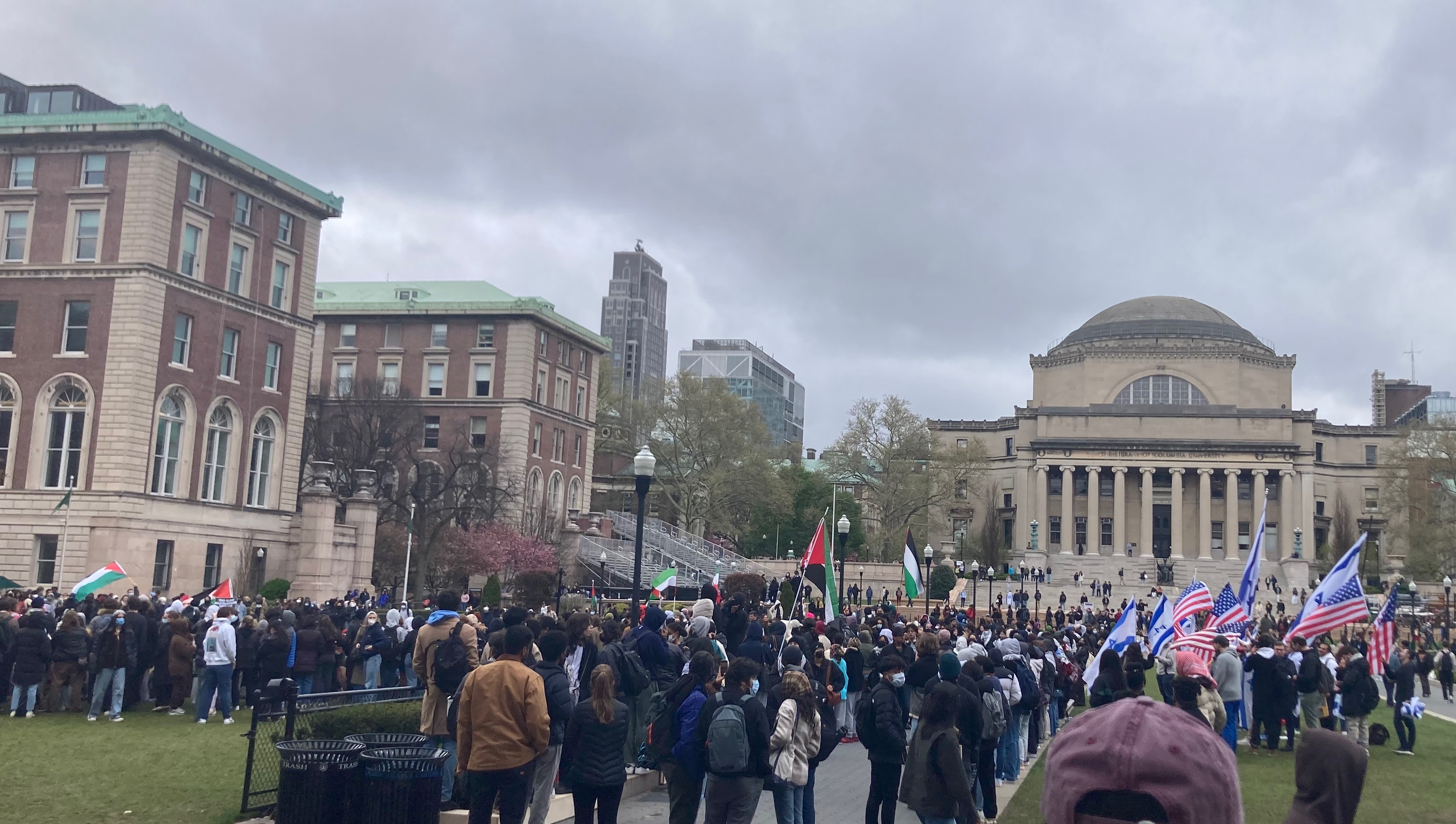
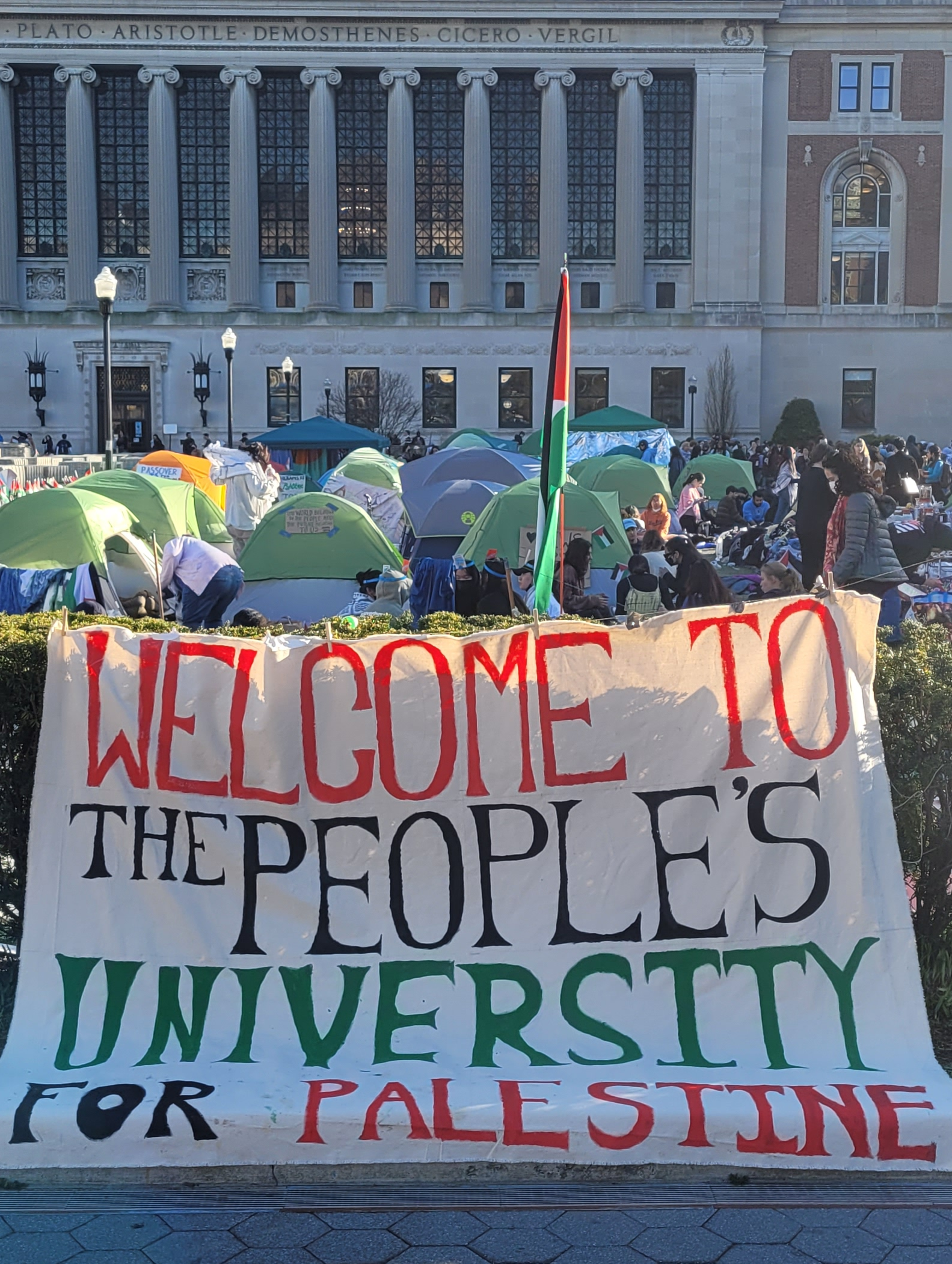
- Date: April 17, 2024–April 30, 2024
- Location: Columbia University, New York City, New York, United States; 40°48′27″N 73°57′43″W
- Caused by: Gaza genocide; Gaza war; opposition to Columbia University's investments in Israel
- Goals: Columbia University's divestment from Israel; academic boycott of Israel; stop forced displacement, in Palestine and in Harlem; NYPD off campus
- Methods: Protests; Occupation; Civil disobedience; Picketing
- Result: proliferation of Palestine solidarity encampments at over 180 universities around the world; detention and attempted deportation of Mahmoud Khalil and Mohsen Mahdawi; suspensions, expulsions, and degree revocations; multiple protesters injured and/or arrested; Columbia University maintains that financial ties with Israeli companies; resignation of Minouche Shafik; sporadic protests continue

Parties
Gaza solidarity groups: Gaza Solidarity Encampment: Columbia University Apartheid Divest (Note: A coalition of student groups formed after the irregular suspension of Students for Justice in Palestine and Jewish Voice for Peace that included, as of November 14, 2023: 1. Students for Justice in Palestine 2. Jewish Voice for Peace 3. Sunrise Columbia 4. Somali Student Association 5. Center for the Study of Ethnicity and Race Student Advisory Board 6. Young Democratic Socialists of America 7. Columbia Queer and Asian 8. Asian American Alliance 9. Columbia Queer Alliance 10. African Students Association 11. Barnard Columbia Abolitionist Collective 12. Housing Equity Project 13. AAPI Interboard 14. VP&S Muslim Students Association 15. White Coats 4 Black Lives 16. Global Learning Exchange 17. CU Afghan Student Alliance 18. Graduate Muslim Student Association 19. Columbia Social Workers for Palestine 20. Poetry Slam 21. Proud Colors 22. Student Worker Solidarity 23. Law School Coalition for a Free Palestine 24. Student Workers of Columbia 25. Black Student Organization 26. SIPA Palestine Working Group 27. Columbia Vietnamese Students Association 28. Columbia Law Students for Palestine 29. Dar: the Palestine Student Union 30. Columbia National Lawyers Guild 31. Muslim Students Association 32. African Studies Working Group 33. Caribbean Students Association 34. Barnard Organization of Soul and Solidarity 35. AZINE Asian / American Arts & Zine Collective 36. CU Turath (Arab Students Association) 37. Columbia Humanitarian Organization for Migration and Emergencies 38. Reproductive Justice Collective 39. Columbia University Black Pre-Professional Society 40. Pakistani Students Association 41. Barnard Columbia Urban Review (missing rep 2 #) 42. Sabor 43. Masaha 44. Club Bangla 45. Mixed Heritage Society 46. Columbia Chicanx Caucus 47. VP&S Black and Latinx Student Organization 48. Columbia Middle Eastern Law Association 49. RightsViews (Human Rights Graduate Journal) 50. School of Social Work Abolition Caucus 51. Hifi Snock Uptown 52. Take Back The Night 53. Native American Council 54. VP&S Global Health Organization 55. VP&S Equity and Justice Fellowship 56. Columbia Law Restorative Justice Collective 57. Mujeres 58. The Columbia Review 59. Student Organization of Latines 60. Alianza 61. GSAS Queer Graduate Collective 62. CU Amnesty International 63. Columbia South Asian Feminisms Alliance 64. Union Theological Seminary Students for a Free Palestine 65. Muslim Law Students Association 66. Columbia Law Parole Advocacy Project 67. Mariachi Leones de Columbia 68. Columbia Asian Pacific American Medical Student Association 69. Columbia Law and Political Economy 70. Columbia Care Access Project 71. Columbia University Asian Pacific American Heritage Month 72. Native American Law Students Association 73. Columbia University Students for Human Rights 74. Raw Elementz 75. WBAR Radio 76. South Asian Law Students Association 77. Latinx Law Students Association 78. Columbia Law School Empowering Women of Color 79. Black Law Students Association at Columbia Law 80. Sexual and Reproductive Health Action Group at Mailman School of Public Health 81. CSSW Queer Caucus 82. CURA Collective 83. Students for Sanctuary 84. Journal for Criminal Justice 85. CLS Human Rights Association 86. Columbia's New York Small Claims Advisory Service 87. Students for Free Tibet 88. Payments for Placements Caucus at Columbia School of Social Work 89. Columbia Policy Institute 90. 4x4 Magazine 91. Genderev 92. Anthropology Graduate Student Association 93. Human Rights Solidarity Network 94. CLS Society for Immigrant and Refugee Rights); Students for Justice in Palestine; Jewish Voice for Peace; Supporting groups: Within Our Lifetime; Neturei Karta; ANSWER Coalition; Palestinian Youth Movement; People's Forum; PAL-Awda; Uptown for Palestine	Trustees of Columbia University in the City of New York Columbia University administration Supporting groups: New York City Police Department; Strategic Response Group; Pro-Israel counterprotesters: Students Supporting Israel; Columbia Aryeh; StandWithUs; New York Hostage and Missing Families Forum; Smaller groups of counterprotesters; External pro-Israel groups: Anti-Defamation League; Brandeis Center; Canary Mission; Betar US; Accuracy in Media; Columbia Alumni for Israel

Lead figures
No centralized leadership; Mahmoud Khalil; Mohsen Mahdawi	Minouche Shafik; Claire Shipman; Eric Adams

Casualties
- Injuries: 37 protesters injured; 9 protesters hospitalized
- Arrested: 222 protesters arrested (Note: 113 during first raid, 109 during second raid)

The Gaza Solidarity Encampment (April 17–30, 2024) was a protest encampment at Columbia University in New York City held in solidarity with the Palestinians of Gaza amid the Gaza genocide, demanding that the university call for an end to the war and genocide and divest from Israel. Six months into the Gaza war and after months of student protest and repression from the university's administration and trustees, the occupation of the lawns in front of Butler Library was a tactical escalation at the university. The encampment was associated with Columbia University Apartheid Divest (CUAD), a coalition of over 100 student groups that formed after the administration irregularly suspended the Columbia chapters of Students for Justice in Palestine and Jewish Voice for Peace in the fall of 2023. The Gaza Solidarity Encampment at Columbia was prominent among the Gaza war protests on university campuses and in the US, and it led to the proliferation of Palestine solidarity encampments at over 180 universities around the world.

The Gaza Solidarity Encampment was established with approximately 50 tents on the East Butler Lawn in the early morning of 17 April 2024, the day the university president Minouche Shafik and co-chairs of the university's board of trustees David Greenwald and Claire Shipman were due to testify before the US House Committee on Education and Workforce. When Shafik summoned the New York Police Department's Strategic Response Group to mass arrest the student protestors and dismantle the encampment on April 18, students from the large crowd that had gathered around the lawn autonomously occupied the adjacent West Butler Lawn, establishing another encampment there the next day. On April 19, the administration entered into negotiations with protestors, which it ceased on April 29, with Shafik announcing "the University will not divest from Israel." In the early hours of April 30, an offshoot of protesters occupied Hamilton Hall, renaming it Hind's Hall in honor of Hind Rajab. After less than 24 hours, the NYPD were summoned a second time. Hundreds of NYPD officers broke into and cleared the hall, arrested more than 100 protesters, and fully dismantled the camp.

The first round of mass arrests on April 18 marked the first time Columbia allowed police to suppress campus protests since the 1968 demonstrations against the Vietnam War. In 2025, the second Trump administration, citing what it described as rampant antisemitism at Columbia, took and imprisoned Palestinian student organizers Mahmoud Khalil and Mohsen Mahdawi without charging them with any crimes. It also withdrew $400 million in federal funds to the university, and issued the university a list of demands including adopting the IHRA definition of antisemitism; punishing student demonstrators with expulsions, degree revocations, and multi-year suspensions; and reviewing the university's Middle East studies programs.. In its settlement with the Trump administration, Columbia's trustees formally accepted these demands and agreed to pay the Trump administration $200 million and establish a claims fund worth $21 million for Jewish employees reporting that they experienced antisemitism at the university.

== Background ==
The Gaza Solidarity Encampment was established after months of student protest at the university and repression from its administration, beginning with the October 9, 2023 Students for Justice in Palestine (SJP) and Jewish Voice for Peace (JVP) joint Statement of Solidarity announcing the first protest on October 12.

A student cited the "hundreds of thousands of Palestinians in Gaza were displaced to tents, where they are still subjected to forced starvation, torture, and bombardment" and Israeli forces' March–April 2024 campaign on Gaza's largest medical facility, Al-Shifa Hospital—"part of their systematic destruction of Gaza’s healthcare sector"—as further motivations for escalation.

=== Protest encampment ===
Stanford University students established the first pro-Palestine university encampment on October 20, 2023. It lasted more than 100 days.

On April 17, 2024, university president Minouche Shafik and co-chairs of the university's board of trustees David Greenwald and Claire Shipman were due to testify before the US House Committee on Education and Workforce.

== Involved parties ==
The campus occupation was organized by Columbia University Apartheid Divest (CUAD), a student-led coalition of over 120 groups; Students for Justice in Palestine (SJP); and Jewish Voice for Peace (JVP). These groups have participated in New York City's pro-Palestinian demonstrations since the October 2023 start of the Gaza war.

Local group Within Our Lifetime (WOL) organized protests around the campus perimeter in support of the encampment, clashing with the NYPD. Other groups protesting outside campus included Neturei Karta, a Jewish anti-Zionist sect, Uptown for Palestine, and a coalition composed of Palestinian Youth Movement, The People's Forum, ANSWER Coalition, and the Palestinian Assembly for Liberation-Awda.

Groups of pro-Israel counterprotesters were also present outside the university and were generally much smaller, with the exception of an April March 26 outside campus organized by StandWithUs and right-wing Christian Zionists that drew hundreds of people.

== Encampments ==
=== April 17, 2024: students establish first encampment; Shafik, Shipman, Greenwald, and Schizer testify before Congress ===
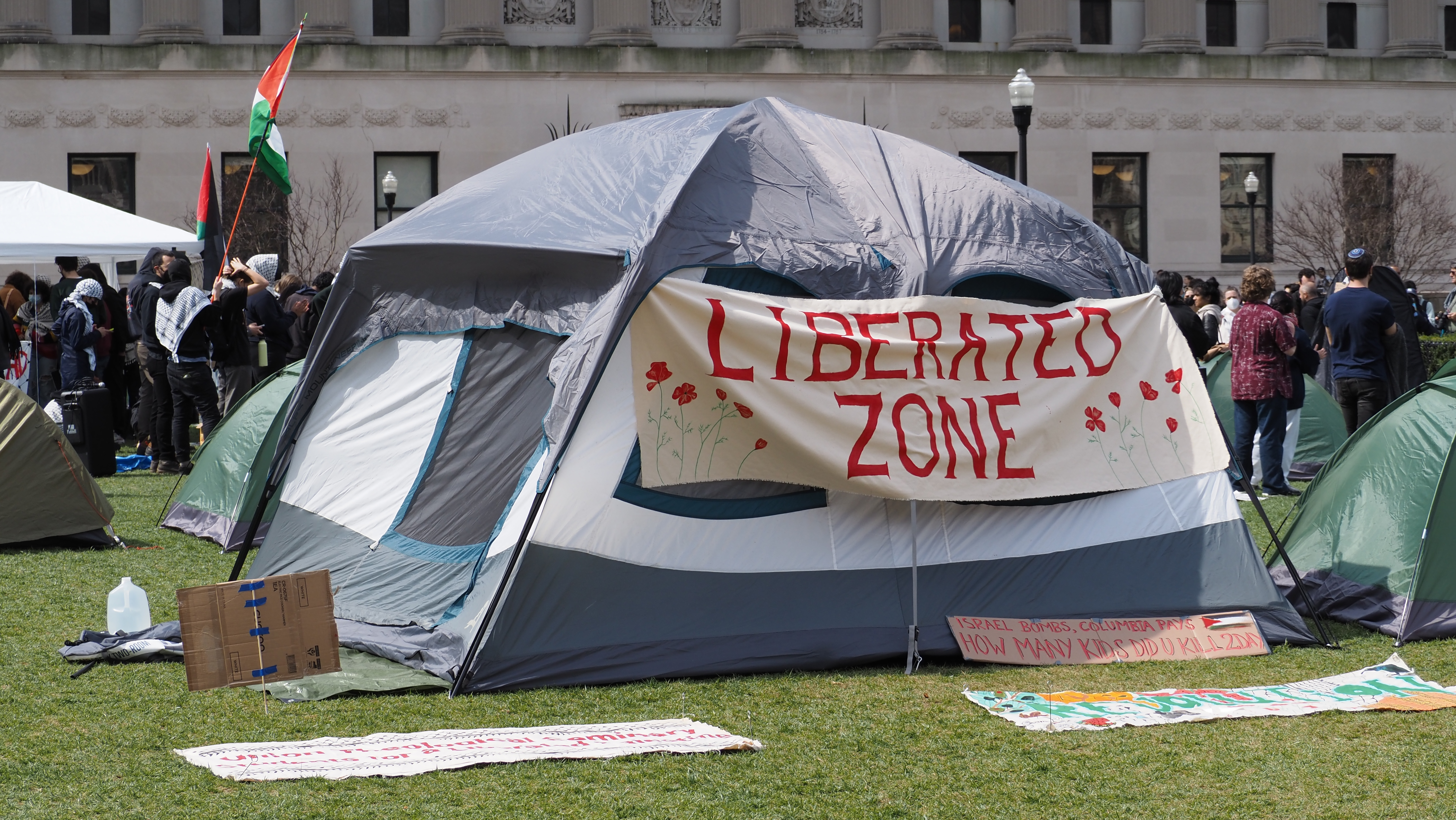
A tent displays a banner saying "Liberated Zone" as protesters occupy Columbia's east lawn, April 17.

On April 17, beginning around 4 am, about 70 protesters sat in tents bearing the Palestinian flag on the East Butler Lawn. Protesters put up banners reading "Gaza Solidarity Encampment" and "Liberated Zone". A substantial NYPD presence was noted outside the university as soon as the encampment was established. Activity in the encampment included a teach-in and film screening.

At about 10 am, Columbia University administrators including President Minouche Shafik, co-chairs of the board of trustees Claire Shipman and David Greenwald, and co-chair of Columbia's Task Force on Antisemitism David Schizer testified before the House Committee on Education and the Workforce regarding allegations of antisemitism at Columbia University. Shafik had previously been invited to attend the November 2023 United States Congress hearing on antisemitism but had declined, citing a scheduling conflict.

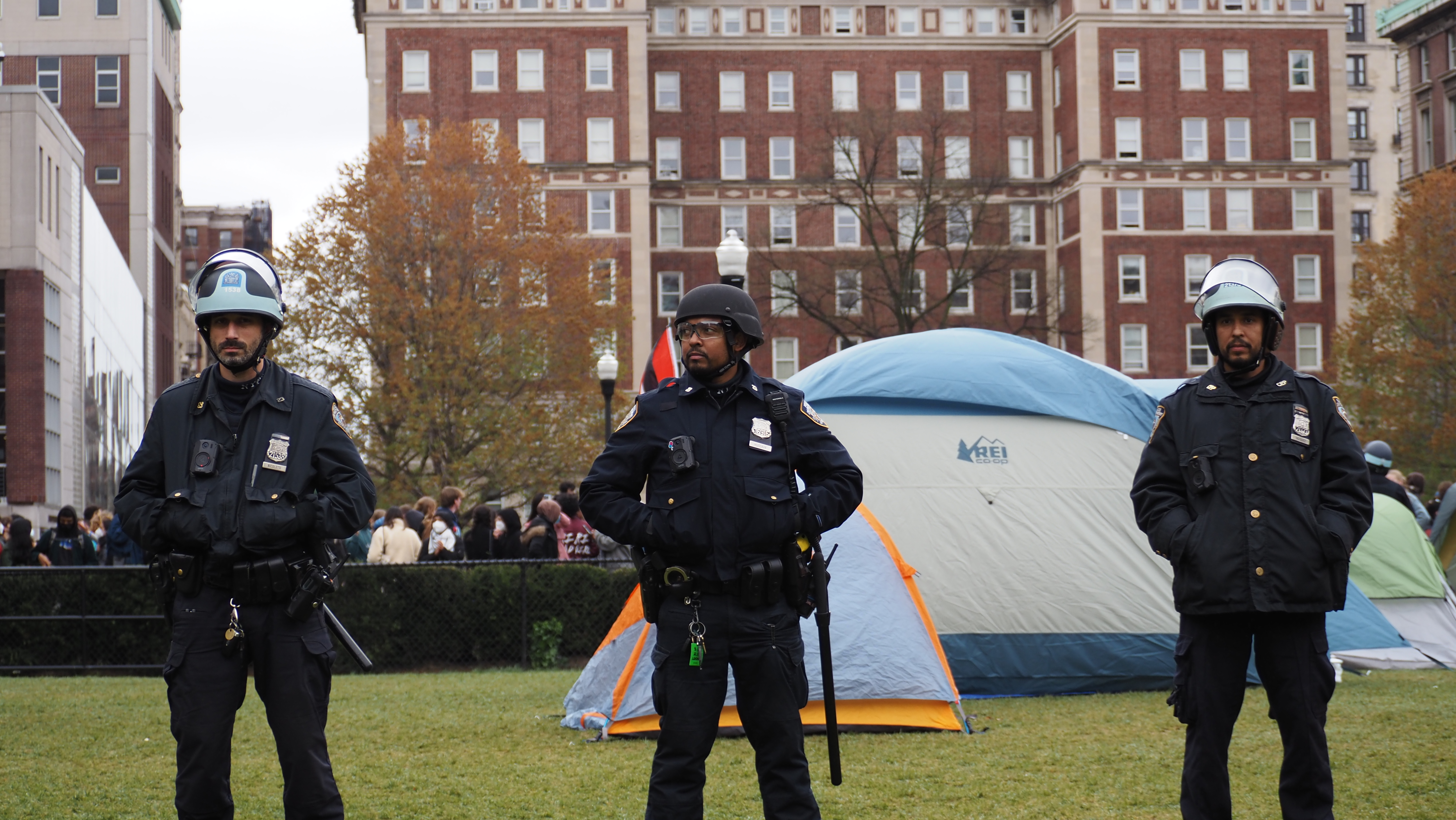
NYPD standing on Butler lawns after arresting approximately 100 student demonstrators, April 18.

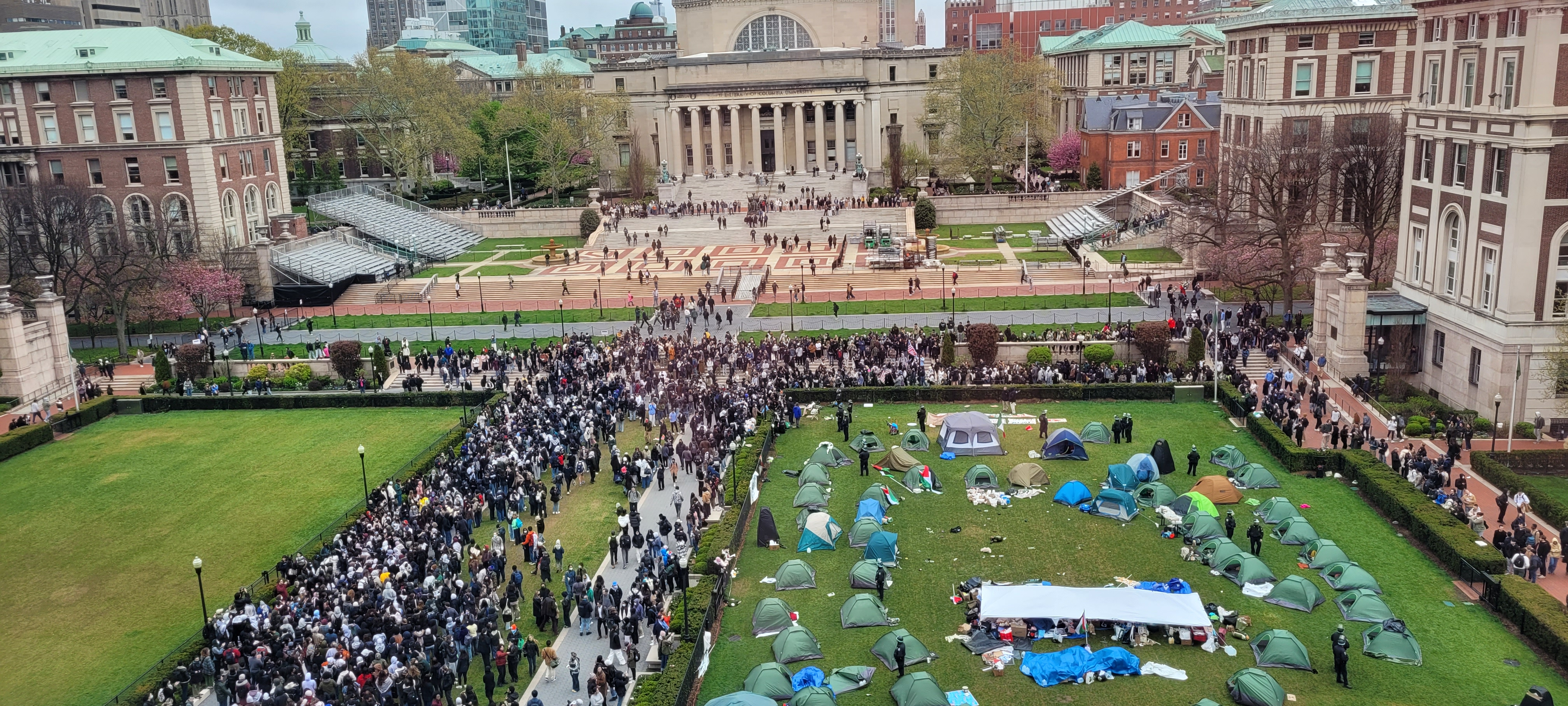
A crowd surrounds the East Lawn around the time of the arrests, shortly before occupying the West Lawn, April 18.

The next day, Shafik authorized the New York City Police Department (NYPD) to enter campus and to arrest student protesters in the encampment. The NYPD sent in its Strategic Response Group, which was founded as a counterterrorism unit and which has been criticized for its use of force, to arrest student protesters at Columbia for the first time since the 1968 protests. Columbia University employees cleared the tents. CUAD (Columbia University Apartheid Divest) said the university dumped students' confiscated belongings in a nearby alley. Three students were suspended, including Isra Hirsi, the daughter of U.S. representative Ilhan Omar. After the NYPD appeared, a group of pro-Israel counter-protesters congregated to celebrate the university's response, waving American and Israeli flags. A protest on 114th Street and Amsterdam Avenue formed, but dispersed to allow buses with detained protesters to exit.

=== April 18, 2024: students in encampment arrested by NYPD and suspended; autonomous occupation of adjacent lawn; second encampment ===
As the NYPD dismantled the first encampment on the East Butler Lawn after its Strategic Response Group had arrested approximately 100 student protesters, other students autonomously occupied the adjacent West Butler Lawn. Cornel West and Mohammed el-Kurd joined the crowd and spoke to the hundreds of students rallying on the lawn. Students hoisted their banners and eventually pitched several tents. A group protested outside the university's main entrance on 116th Street. Protesters on 116th Street and Broadway moved toward 120th Street after a man was taken into custody. All of the student protesters the NYPD arrested were released by late evening and informed by the university that they were indefinitely suspended.

A staff member at Barnard resigned citing the administration's mistreatment of students, describing the decision to summon the NYPD on students "insanely racially violent."

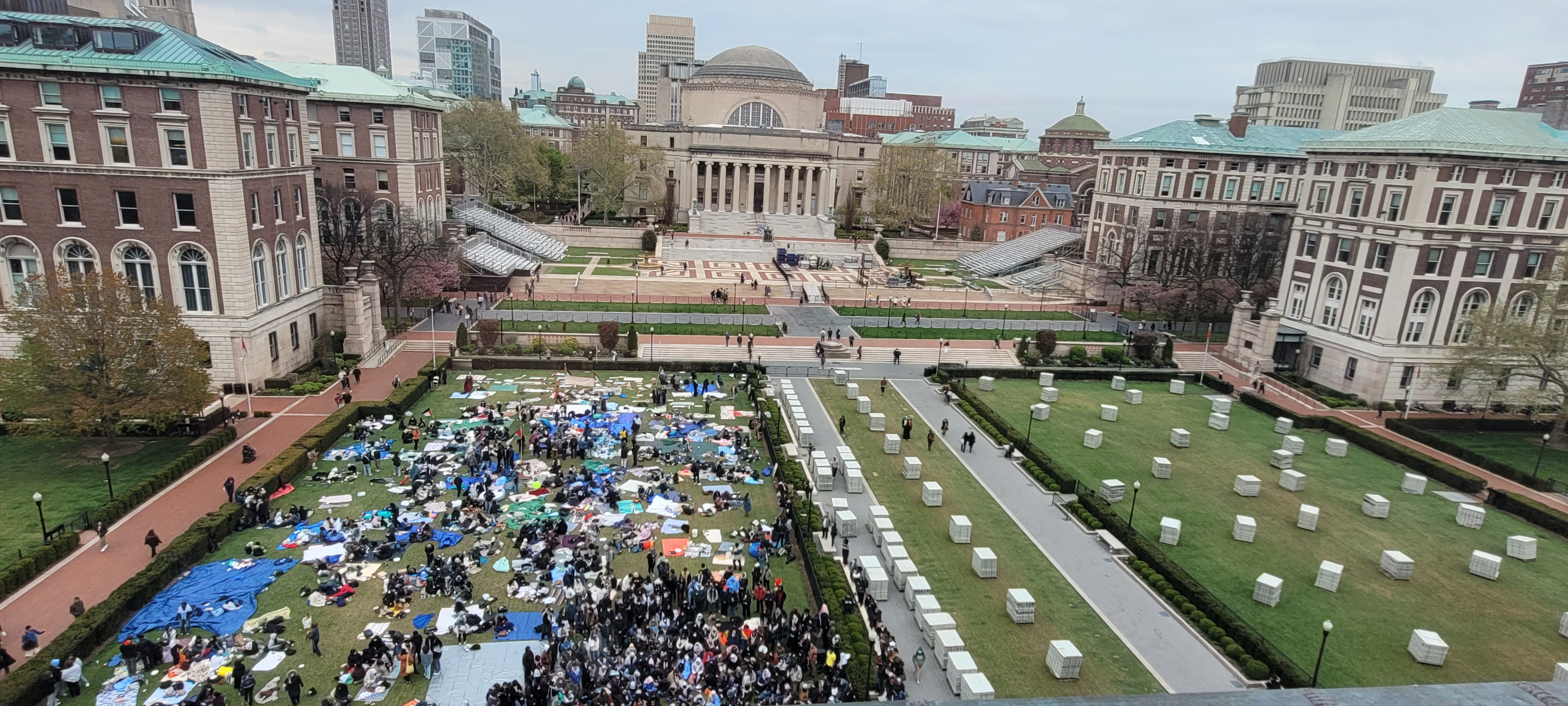
The sit-in on the West Lawn, occupied autonomously by the crowd that gathered at the time of the arrests, the following day after having held the lawn through the night. The East Lawn has obstacles placed to prevent a reestablishment of the original encampment, April 19.

=== April 19, 2024: Jummah and Shabat in the encampment; evening of Palestinian culture ===
On April 19, protesters remained camped out on campus; SJP chapters at the University of North Carolina, Boston University, and Ohio State University, as well as the Harvard College Palestine Solidarity Committee at Harvard University, announced rallies in solidarity with the Columbia protesters. Norman Finkelstein, an anti-Zionist political scientist and activist, appeared and gave a speech to protesters. A Muslim jummah prayer service and a Jewish Kabbalat Shabbat prayer service with a banner reading "Shabbat Shalom from the Liberated Zone" were held at the encampment in the afternoon and evening, respectively. In the evening, the encampment hosted Palestinian music, dancing, and poetry, including work by Refaat Alareer, a Palestinian poet killed in a targeted airstrike December 2023, as well as writing from Walid Daqqa, a Palestinian writer who died in Israeli prison earlier that month.

Six students who were wearing keffiyehs to the School of General Studies Gala in support of the 108 students arrested in connection with the "Gaza Solidarity Encampment" said they were harassed and physically assaulted at the event.

During the weekend of April 20–21, public safety officers from the administration told WKCR-FM, which had been broadcasting information about the protest, to vacate its office due to an unspecified danger. Staff refused, saying they had a responsibility to broadcast information 24/7. WKCR later said it was a misunderstanding. Protesters also targeted some Jewish students with "antisemitic vitriol", leaving some Jewish students "fearful for their safety on the campus and its vicinity".

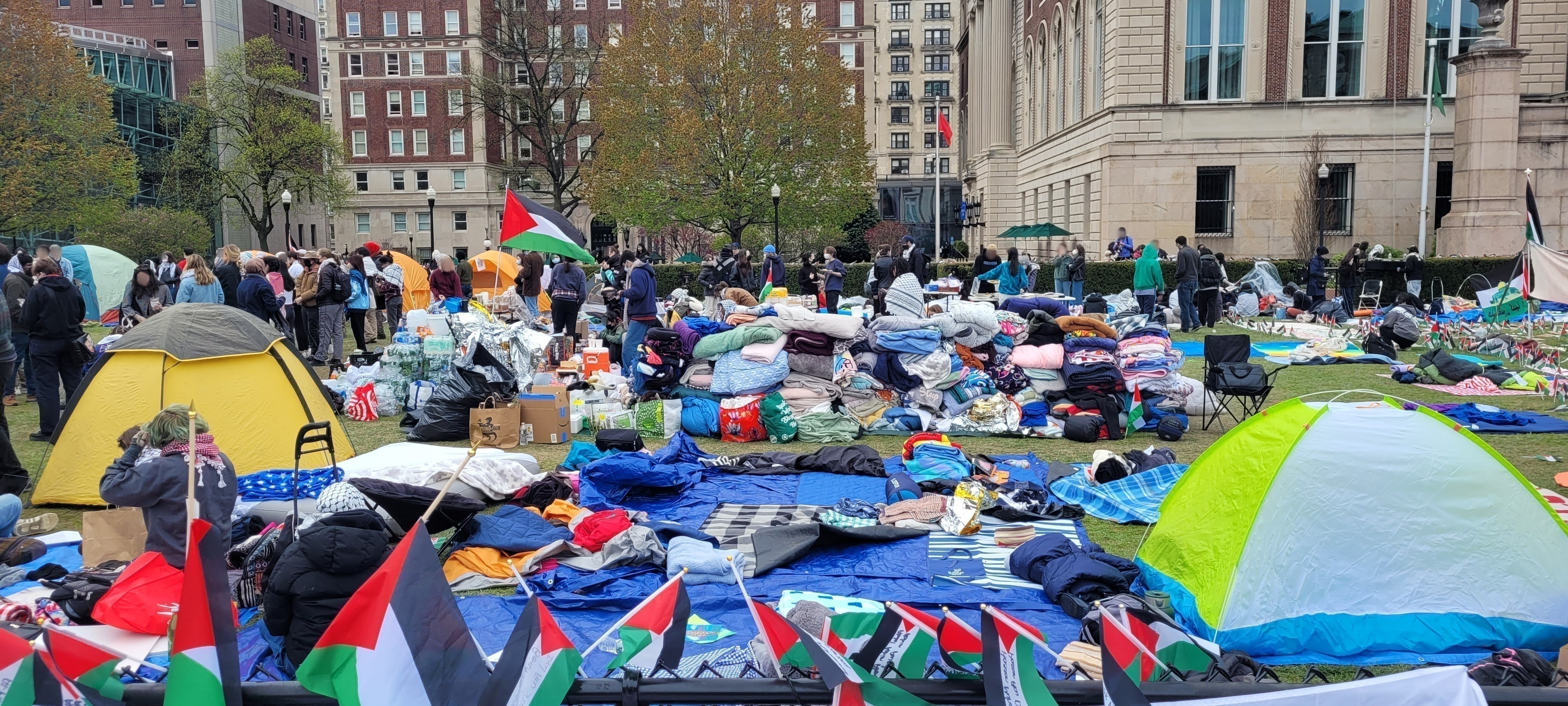
New tents added on the West Lawn, where the Gaza Solidarity Encampment was reestablished, April 21.

On April 21, Elie Buechler, a rabbi associated with Columbia University's Orthodox Union Jewish Learning Initiative on Campus, recommended that Jewish students "return home as soon as possible and remain home", arguing that the ongoing campus occupation had "made it clear that Columbia University’s Public Safety and the NYPD cannot guarantee Jewish students’ safety". Footage of protests over the weekend showed some protesters using antisemitic language against Jewish students, and many Jewish students said they felt unsafe.

=== April 22, 2024: Referendum majority in favor of divestment; faculty walkout; Gaza Liberation Seder ===
A majority of Columbia College students voted in favor of divestment in a referendum sent by the Columbia College Student Council. With 40.26% of students participating in the referendum, 76.55% voted in favor of financially divesting from Israel, 68.36% voted to cancel the opening of the Tel Aviv Global Center, and 65.62% voted to end the dual degree program with Tel Aviv University.

Hundreds of Columbia faculty members walked out of classes to protest the university's response to the protest. Because of the protest, the university canceled classes on April 22, and then said it would switch to blended learning for the remainder of the semester. The Columbia Elections Board announced that a referendum on divestment from Israel, originally proposed by CUAD on March 3, 2024, had passed by a large margin, showing that Columbia's student body mostly supported the initiative.

In the evening, Jewish students at Barnard and Columbia, many arrested and suspended days before, hosted an outdoor Gaza Liberation Seder in the encampment on the first evening of Passover. The seder featured a student-authored haggada and the ceremony was led by a student wearing a watermelon kippa.

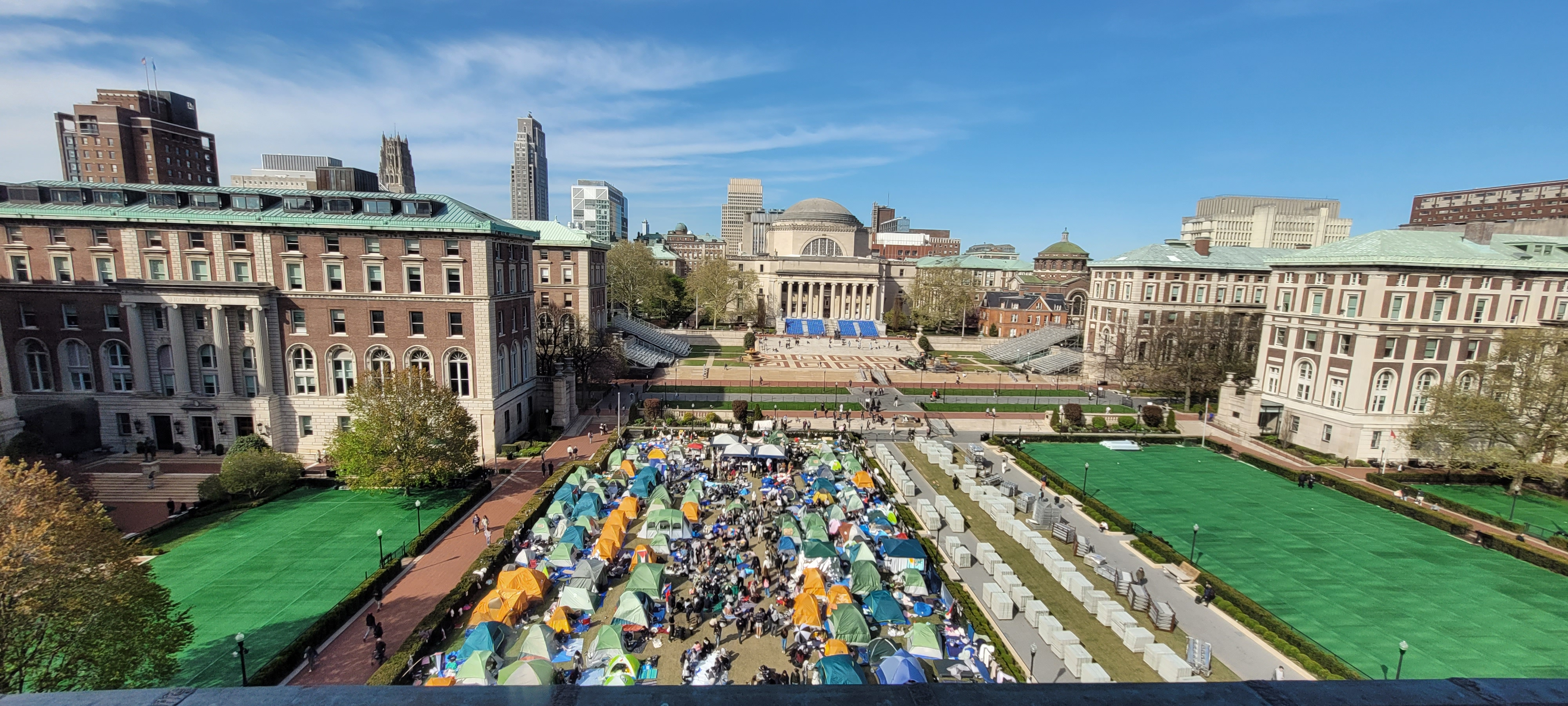
The second encampment, which was larger than the initial one, held over 60 tents, with barricades isolating the encampment from pedestrians walking through the university's lawn.

=== April 23, 2024: Barnard suspends and evicts 55 students; Shafik announces midnight deadline; National Guard alarm ===
Student Protests at Columbia, April 2024

April 17 (First Encampment)

April 19 (Second Encampment)

April 29 (Hamilton Hall Occupation)

For their alleged participation in the Gaza Solidarity Encampment, 55 students were suspended and evicted by Barnard College, representing 1.64% of the Barnard's student body. Students were also were given 15 minutes to gather their belongings from their Barnard residences and denied dining hall access. A professor at Barnard described its disciplinary policy as "draconian" and "breathtaking in its inhumanity."

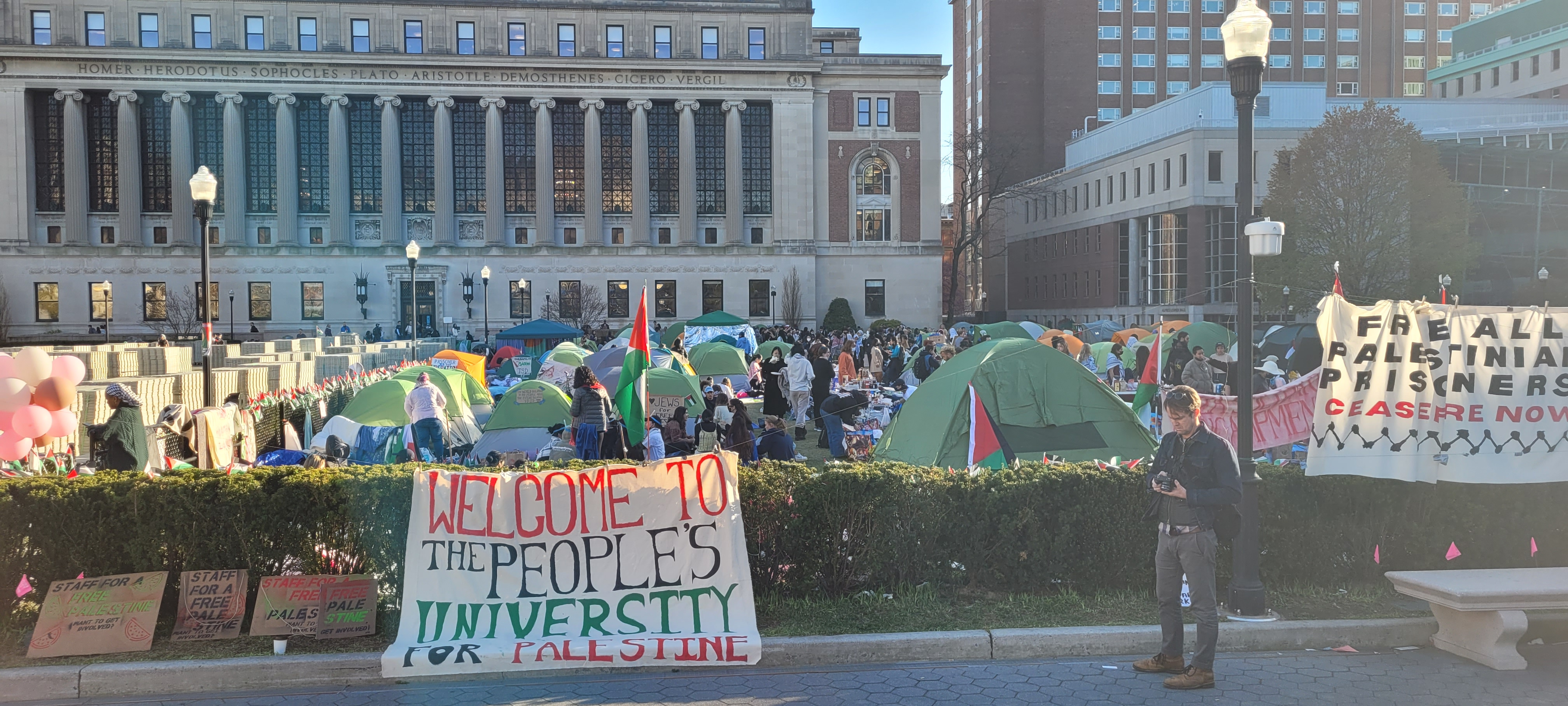
Signs at the second encampment, including one stating: "Welcome to the People's University for Palestine"

Five days after summoning the NYPD to arrest the first batch of student protesters, Shafik set a midnight deadline for negotiations in a public announcement declaring:

For several days, a small group of faculty, administrators, and University Senators have been in dialogue with student organizers to discuss the basis for dismantling the encampment, dispersing, and following university policies going forward. Those talks are facing a deadline of midnight tonight to reach agreement. I very much hope these discussions are successful. If they are not, we will have to consider alternative options for clearing the West Lawn and restoring calm to campus so that students can complete the term and graduate.

After US Senators urged President Biden to send in the US National Guard, rumors circulated that the midnight deadline was placed on Columbia's administration by Mayor Eric Adams or Governor Kathy Hochul, and that the National Guard would be summoned if it were not met. In the negotiation room, Senior Vice Provost Kachani and Dean Alonso representing the administration, after consulting with "the rest of the senior administration team," could neither confirm nor deny that the National Guard or NYPD would come onto campus by the night of April 24. In a press release the night of April 23, Columbia SJP accused the administration of threatening to call in the National Guard or NYPD and Mahmoud Khalil announced that, "without assurances of good faith bargaining and protections for nonviolent protestors against police and military violence, we will not be returning to the table."

=== April 24, 2024: negotiation deadline extension ===
In an email sent to affiliates shortly after 4 am, the administration announced that negotiations would be extended by 48 hours, with CUAD announcing that the administration agreed not to involve the NYPD or the National Guard in campus protests in that time. In a press briefing, University spokesperson Ben Chang stated that the accusation that administrators threatened to bring the National Guard to campus was an “untrue and unsubstantiated claim” while reaffirming that, if the negotiations were not successful, the administration would "have to consider alternative options for clearing the West Lawn." The student protesters agreed to reduce the number of tents in compliance with New York City Fire Department (FDNY) requirements and ensure that protesters not affiliated with Columbia would leave campus. Meanwhile, the NYPD dispersed about 100 protesters outside campus.

In the afternoon of April 24, Speaker of the United States House of Representatives Mike Johnson gave a speech in front of Low Library condemning the protesters and calling for Shafik to resign. Some in attendance loudly booed him. During his speech, Johnson said that during the October 7 attack, "infants were cooked in ovens", an unsubstantiated claim. Later, he called on President Joe Biden to deploy the National Guard to quell the protests; White House Press Secretary Karine Jean-Pierre replied that such deployment is up to the governor of New York, not the president. The next day, Palestine Legal filed a Title VI suit with regard to suspended students. The Columbia Board of Trustees issued statements in affirmation of Shafik. The University Senate held an emergency meeting with Shafik to consider censuring her.

=== April 25, 2024: United for Israel rally outside Amsterdam gates ===
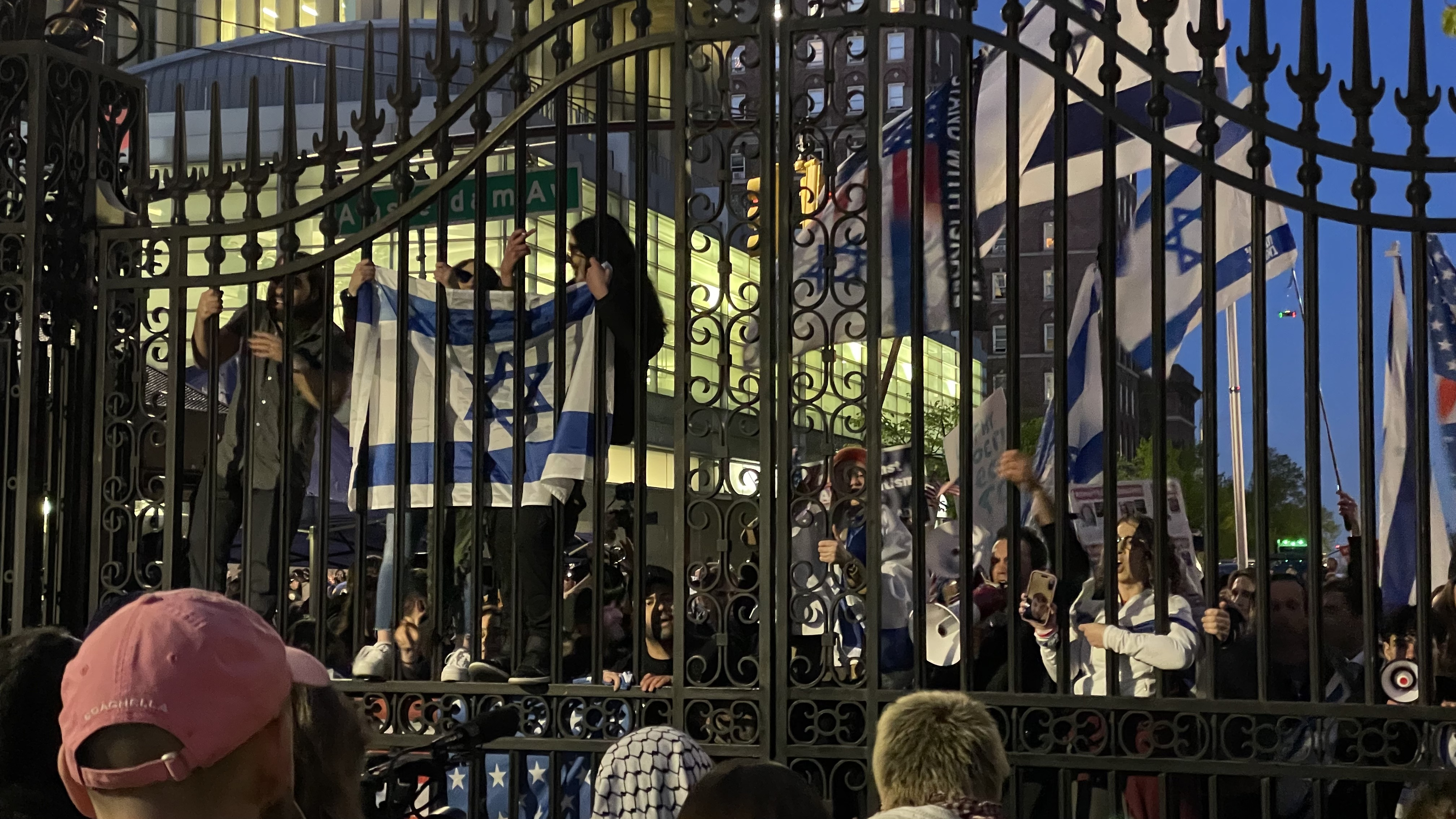
Demonstrators holding Israeli flags climbing Columbia's gates on Amsterdam Avenue and during the StandWithUs United for Israel march and rally, April 25.

On the evening of April 25, at Columbia's Amsterdam Avenue gates, a United for Israel rally held by StandWithUs along with right-wing figures including Sean Feucht, Eric Metaxas, and Russell B. Johnson, attracted hundreds of pro-Israel demonstrators, and multiple incidents of harassment were reported. The rally was promoted as a "unity march of Christians and Jews" and some demonstrators harassed pro-Palestinian counter-protesters and targeted some counter-protesters inside the gates. Around 3 pm the day before, Gavin McInnes, founder of the far-right militant group the Proud Boys, had gained access to campus and was seen approaching students at the encampment with a recording device and unsuccessfully attempting to gain access to the encampment, being turned away by students.

U.S. Representatives Alexandria Ocasio-Cortez and Jamaal Bowman visited the encampment. Columbia library workers issued a statement condemning Shafik for deploying police and private security against the protesters. More than 1,000 pro-Israel protesters organized by the "New York Hostage and Missing Families Forum" rallied at 116th and Broadway. The University Senate announced plans to call for a censure vote against Shafik but decided instead to vote on a resolution expressing displeasure with her out of reluctance to oust the president in a time of crisis.

Khymani James, a Columbia student who participated in the protest movement, was barred from campus after a video from January surfaced in which they said, "Zionists don’t deserve to live". Some protest groups condemned the comment, although one group, Columbia University Apartheid Divest, retracted its condemnation in October 2024 and apologized to James, calling for violence against supporters of Israeli policy. The New York Times said James's comments raised the question, "How much of the movement in support of the Palestinian people in Gaza is tainted by antisemitism?" On April 27, James apologized. The NYPD said that outside agitators were trying to hijack the protests, and that they were ready to raid the campus if needed. The next day, the administration called for the protesters to leave, and said that bringing back the NYPD would be counterproductive.

=== April 29, 2024: Shafik announces end of negotiations: Columbia "will not divest from Israel" ===
On the morning of Monday, April 29, Shafik announced in an email that negotiations had ceased without having reached an agreement, and that Columbia "will not divest from Israel." The email encouraged those participating in the encampment to "voluntarily disperse" and threatened to suspend students still in the encampment by 2 pm. CUAD voted to stay in the encampment after the deadline, and SJP told members not to sign any administration deals. Faculty linked arms around the encampment before the deadline. Despite the threats, students stayed in the encampment and surrounding areas. Suspensions began later that day. Meanwhile, a Jewish student sued the university for failing to provide a safe environment, police set up barricades outside the university, and alumni wrote Shafik a letter asking her to clear the encampment.

=== April 30, 2024: "Hind's Hall" occupation of Hamilton Hall, subsequent raid, and arrests ===
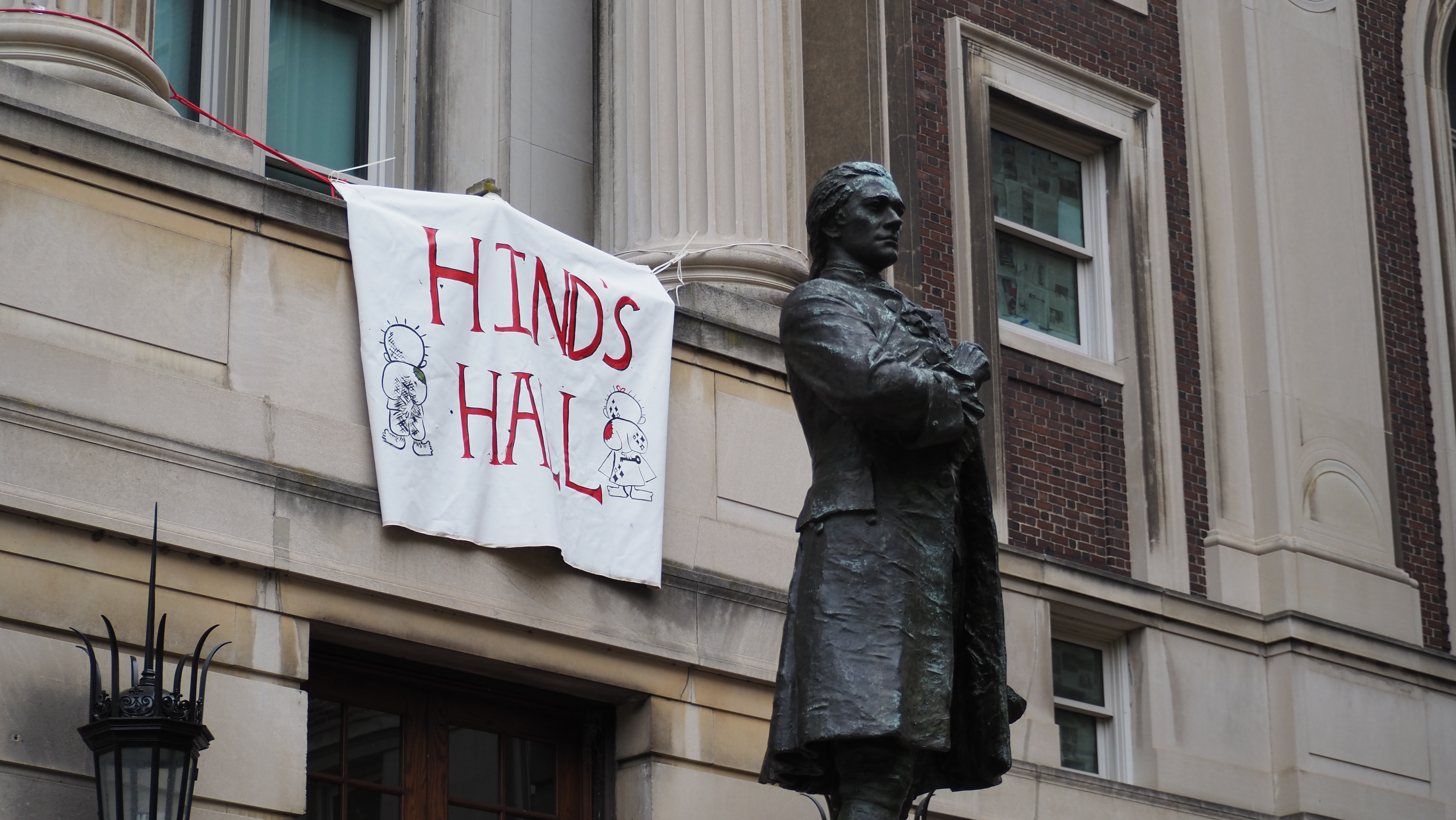
A banner with the name "Hind's Hall" for Hind Rajab, a Palestinian child killed by Israeli forces, and Handala iconography hangs from Hamilton Hall the day after protesters occupied the building.

In the early morning of April 30, protesters occupied Hamilton Hall and barricaded themselves inside. Protesters unfurled a banner proclaiming the building "Hind's Hall" in honor of Hind Rajab, a young Palestinian girl killed by Israeli forces. A campus police officer in the lobby left the building when confronted by the occupiers, while three Columbia janitors, among them Mario Torres, who tried to block the protesters, were briefly stuck inside and left the building after approximately 30 minutes. The campus was locked down and higher police presence was noted near campus; the NYPD and the university said they would not send police in. The administration threatened to expel students who participated in the hall takeover. Activist Lisa Fithian was spotted aiding protesters breaking into Hamilton Hall.

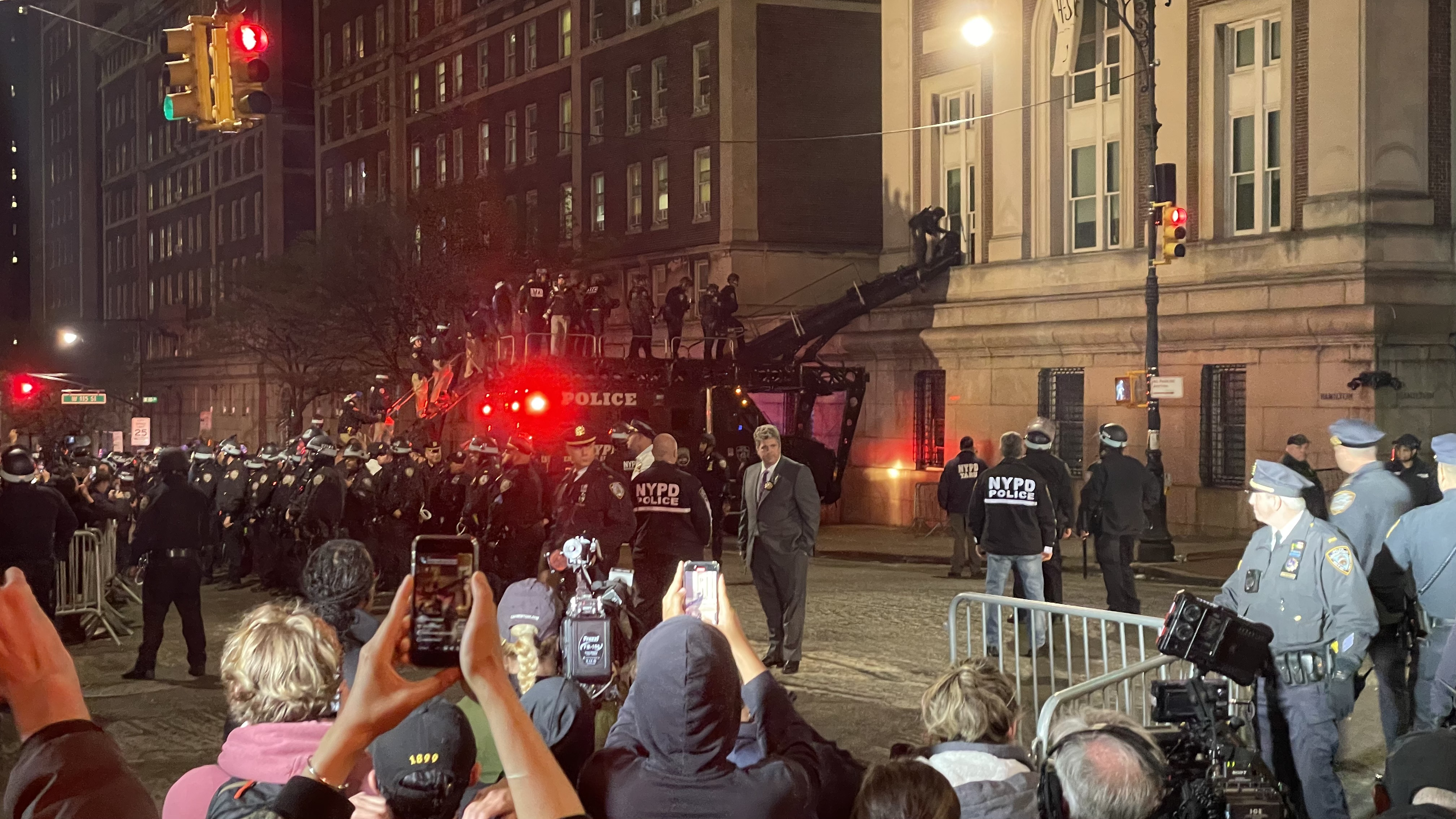
NYPD officers preparing to raid Hamilton Hall line up aboard a Lenco BearCat.

According to the Columbia University Senate's 2025 Sundial Report, over 600 NYPD officers were deployed to Columbia University on April 30. Officers of the NYPD's Strategic Response Group (SRG) were used again in the April 30 sweep. The administration told students to shelter in place due to "heightened activity". The NYPD prepared to raid the campus after a letter from Shafik gave it permission. Protesters appeared undeterred, continuing chants. At around 9 pm, with administration approval, hundreds of NYPD officers entered campus. The administration blamed protesters for escalating by taking Hamilton Hall. According to Shafik's letter to the NYPD Deputy Commissioner of Legal Matters requesting police intervention, someone hid in the building until it closed, then let others in. Columbia believed that while students were among those who entered, their leaders were unaffiliated with the university. Police used flash-bang grenades to breach the building and arrested more than 100 protesters. Officers were seen entering the building with weapons drawn, and a shot was fired inside the building. The district attorney's office said no one was injured and their Police Accountability Unit was reviewing the incident. By the end of the night, Hamilton Hall and the entire campus were cleared, including the encampment.

The Washington Post reported that billionaires and titans of business in a WhatsApp group with Mayor Eric Adams encouraged him to send police to sweep the Columbia protests. The Post reported that a group including Daniel Lubetzky, Daniel S. Loeb, Len Blavatnik, and Joseph Sitt joined a Zoom call with Adams on April 26, a week after he first sent the NYPD onto Columbia's campus to arrest students, and some spoke of making political donations to Adams. Ways members of the WhatsApp group could pressure Columbia's trustees and administration to summon the police on the protesters were also discussed.

According to Manhattan District Attorney Alvin Bragg, 109 people were arrested at Columbia. In the letter to the deputy commissioner, Shafik requested an NYPD presence through at least May 17, two days after the scheduled commencement. On May 2, the NYPD announced that during arrests at Columbia, out of 112 people arrested, 32 were not affiliated with the school. Mayor Eric Adams said there was evidence that two outside agitators and "professionals", Lisa Fithian and the wife of Sami Al-Arian, had given students tactical knowledge and training to escalate the protests.

=== May 31 – June 2, 2024: "Revolt for Rafah" alumni weekend encampment ===
On May 31, students regrouped and launched a third encampment. About 100 students participated in the protest, which was said to be a response to the Rafah offensive and a Washington Post article revealing that elites pressured Adams into sending the NYPD in during the second raid. Students said the encampment was only the first of a continued protest presence on the campus, remaining for alumni reunion weekend. By 7 pm, about two dozen students with ten tents had occupied part of the South Lawn during the university's alumni reunion. According to Columbia SJP, the protesters identify as "an autonomous group of Palestinian students". The encampment was dismantled on June 2, once the alumni weekend ended. The NYPD briefly entered the campus to document vandalism that took place.

== Negotiations ==
Negotiations between the student protesters of the Gaza Solidarity Encampment and the administration of Columbia University went on for 10 days, beginning at 10 am in Room 407 of Low Library on April 19, 2024—the day after NYPD arrested about a hundred students from the East Lawn and students autonomously occupied the adjacent West Lawn—and continuing to April 28, when University President Minouche Shafik announced the end of negotiations and that Columbia "will not divest from Israel."

According to The Eye, Columbia did not reveal the chain of command outside of the negotiation room and "positioned key administrators to be the public face for negotiations and kept others within University leadership, including the trustees, away from the conversation," and therefore, "the protesters never came into direct dialogue with those empowered to answer their demands." The Eye also noted that the negotiators on behalf of the administration—Soulaymane Kachani, senior vice provost of the university, and Carlos J. Alonso, dean of the Graduate School of Arts and Sciences—were reporting to and working with Jelani Cobb, dean of the School of Journalism, and Josef Sorett, dean of Columbia College, who had reportedly been appointed by Provost Angela Olinto and who were in communication with the trustees.

On April 23, rumors circulated that the midnight deadline was placed on Columbia's administration by Mayor Eric Adams or Governor Kathy Hochul, and that the National Guard would be summoned if it were not met. Kachani and Alonso representing the administration, after consulting with "the rest of the senior administration team," could neither confirm nor deny that the National Guard or NYPD would come onto campus by the night of April 24. In a press release the night of April 23, Columbia SJP accused the administration of threatening to call in the National Guard or NYPD and Mahmoud Khalil announced that, "without assurances of good faith bargaining and protections for nonviolent protestors against police and military violence, we will not be returning to the table."

Shortly after 4 am on April 24, the administration announced that negotiations would be extended by 48 hours, with CUAD announcing that the administration agreed not to involve the NYPD or the National Guard in campus protests in that time. In a press briefing, University spokesperson Ben Chang stated that the accusation that administrators threatened to bring the National Guard to campus was an “untrue and unsubstantiated claim” while reaffirming that, if the negotiations were not successful, the administration would "have to consider alternative options for clearing the West Lawn." The student protesters agreed to reduce the number of tents in compliance with New York City Fire Department (FDNY) requirements and ensure that protesters not affiliated with Columbia would leave campus.

On April 25, Columbia's administration made its offer that came closest to addressing the protesters's demand of divestment from companies and institutions that "profit from Israeli apartheid, genocide, and occupation in Palestine" came on April 25, in a meeting in Butler Library. Representing the administration in the meeting were Kachani and Alonso as well as another member of the administration taking notes. The negotiators on behalf of the encampment included Mahmoud Khalil and another student, who would report back to the encampment where there proposals would be voted on. There were also five members of the University Senate present as third-party mediators, including its executive committee chair Jeanine D'Armiento and a senator from the Business School. This April 25 proposal offered an expedited review of divestment proposals by the Columbia's Advisory Committee on Socially Responsible Investing (ACSRI)—which The Columbia Daily Spectator's magazine The Eye described as "a disempowered proxy body"—but it did not guarantee divestment or even that a divestment proposal would reach the board of trustees for a vote.

On the morning of Monday, April 29, Shafik announced in an email that negotiations had ceased without having reached an agreement, and that Columbia "will not divest from Israel."

== Aftermath and legacy ==
Universities in the United States with Gaza War protests since April 2024. Columbia University is marked in red. Other colleges that had encampments are marked in green, and non-encampment protests are marked in blue.

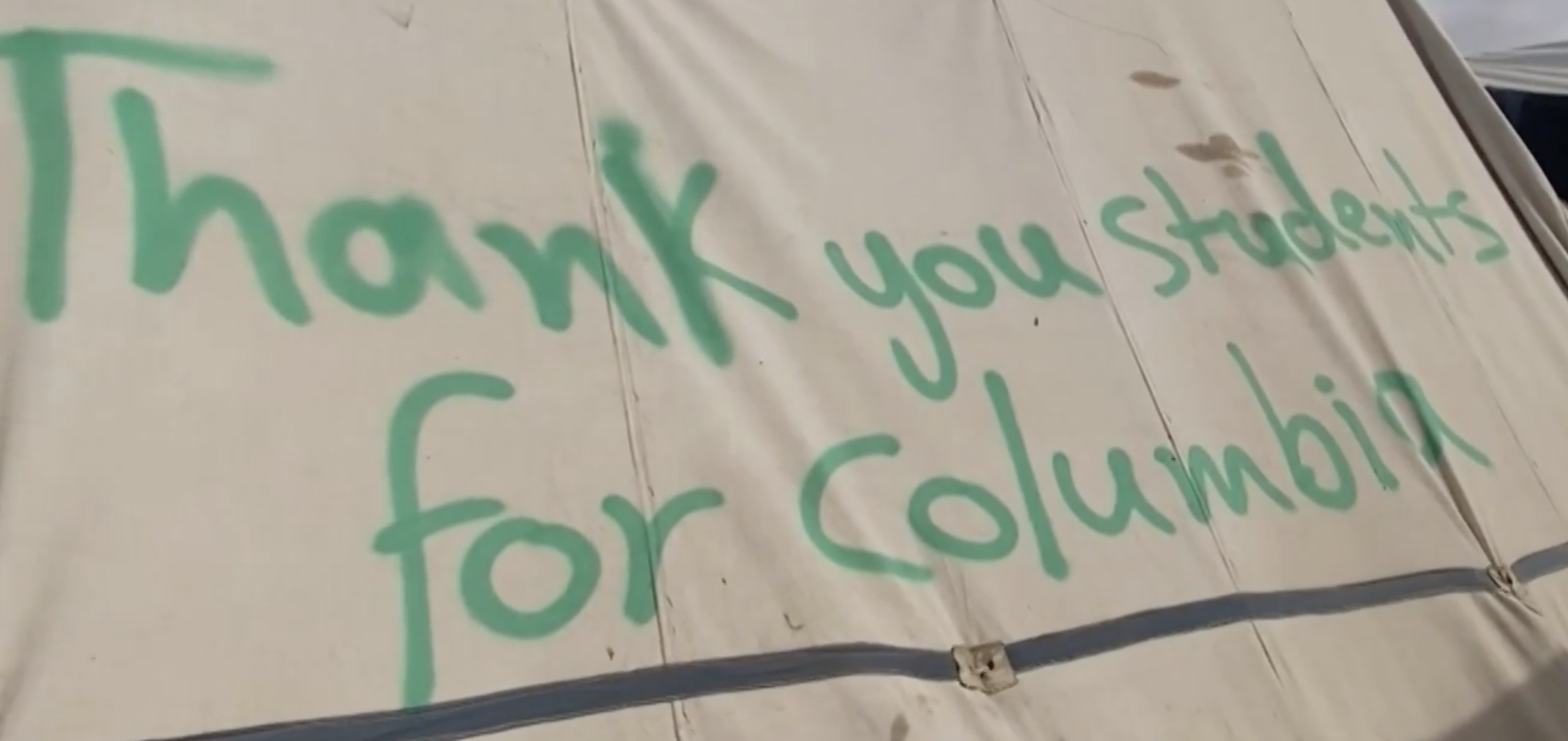
"Thank you students for Columbia" spray-painted on a tent in Rafah, April 2024.

=== August 23, 2024: Armstrong announces creation of Office of Institutional Equity (OIE) and position of Rules Administrator ===
In response to the student protest movement in solidarity with Gaza, and particularly after the Gaza Solidarity Encampment, Columbia's administration reorganized its disciplinary system.

In a message to the Columbia community ahead of the fall 2024 semester, Armstrong announced the Office of Institutional Equity (OIE), a newly created office led by Vice Provost Laura Kirschstein, empowered to punish students and faculty it finds guilty of discrimination. It centralized the reporting of and investigations into cases of discrimination and harassment at Columbia, replacing the Office of Equal Opportunity and Affirmative Action (EOAA) and taking over its responsibilities. The OIE, functioning with non-transparent procedures, is authorized by the university to issue disciplinary notifications, suspensions, and expulsions, and to expel affiliates from university housing or revoke the degrees of graduates.

The message also announced the position of a new Rules Administrator, to which Gregory Wawro, formerly a professor of political science, was appointed.

=== March 7, 2025: Trump administration cuts $400 million in funding to Columbia ===
Days after the Federal Task Force to Combat Antisemitism announced it was considering stop-work orders on $51.4 million in federal contracts with the university, the Trump administration announced a $400 million cut in federal funding to Columbia University. Trump had publicly criticized Columbia 25 years earlier when it refused to purchase a property in Midtown from him for $400 million.

=== March 13, 2025: Expulsions, degree revocations, and suspensions for Gaza Solidarity Encampment and Hind's Hall student protesters ===
The Columbia University Judicial Board (UJB) issued a statement announcing expulsions, multiple-year suspensions, and degree revocations for students involved in the Gaza Solidarity Encampment and Hind's Hall occupation of Hamiltion Hall, two days after Rules Administrator Gregory Wawro announced that hearings had been completed. Although these announcements came after the Trump administration demanded this exact kind of punishment, Wawro expressed confidence that the community would "accept the legitimacy of the outcomes, whatever they may be, since we followed our longstanding practices and policies under the Rules."

Most of the cases had been transferred from the Center for Student Success and Intervention (CSSI)—a body established in 2022 providing fewer protections for students and from which the university outsources the disciplinary process to Debevoise & Plimpton, a private law firm—to the UJB, a body established after the 1968 protests and under the University Senate's purview.

Columbia punished 22 students, all of whom were cleared of any criminal charges, with expulsions, multiple-year suspensions, or degree revocations. Among those Columbia expelled was Grant Miner, a PhD student and president of the Student Workers of Columbia—UAW 2710 union, which was due to begin its contract bargaining with Columbia the following day.

=== May 22, 2025: Trump administration accuses Columbia of violating Jewish students' rights ===
The Department of Health and Human Services accused Columbia of violating Jewish students' rights as proscribed by Title VI of the Civil Rights Act of 1964.

=== June 4, 2025: Department of Education says Columbia does not meet accreditation standards ===
The US Department of Education said Columbia failed to meet accreditation standards due to what it described as a failure to protect Jewish students on campus, a violation of federal anti-discrimination laws.

=== July 15, 2025: Shipman announces Columbia will adopt IHRA definition and partner with the ADL ===
Amid negotiations with the Trump administration over $400 million of federal funding it withdrew from Columbia, acting president Claire Shipman announced that Columbia would adopt the IHRA definition of antisemitism and partner with the Anti-Defamation League (ADL). In the negotiations, Trump's team was led by Stephen Miller and Columbia was represented by Jay Lefkowitz and Matt Owen of the law firm Kirkland & Ellis. Professor Rashid Khalidi cited Columbia's adoption of the IHRA definition as the reason he cancelled his fall lecture course History of the Modern Middle East.

=== July 23, 2025: Columbia settles with Trump administration and agrees to pay $220 million ===
The day after issuing 70 expulsions, suspensions, and degree revocations to students for the "Basel Al-Araj Popular University" occupation of Butler Library, Columbia finalized negotiations with the Trump administration and agreed to pay the federal government a $220 million settlement. As part of the deal, Columbia agreed to provide the federal government with the private information of applicants to the university—those admitted as well as those not admitted—including their race, GPA, and standardized test scores.

As part of the settlement with the Trump administration, Columbia established a claims fund worth $21 million for Jewish employees reporting that they experienced antisemitism at the university. The fund is a settlement of the Title VII investigation of the university from the federal government's Equal Employment Opportunity Commission (EEOC), which will also decide Jewish employees' eligibility for compensation and how much money each will receive. The EEOC started investigating Columbia for antisemitism when its chair, Andrea R. Lucas, filed a formal discrimination complaint against Columbia in June 2024. Some faculty members, including James Schamus, criticized the fund and questioned whether Jewish professors would be given compensation if they supported the Gaza Solidarity Encampment.

== Media coverage ==
The occupation, ensuing crackdowns, and national spread had extensive media coverage. Some reporting by mainstream media outlets was decried as misleading and biased against protesters. In an article for al-Jazeera, University of Michigan student Ahmad Ibsais called media coverage of the protest movement "sensationalist" and said that accusations of antisemitism were false. The New Republic alleged that the protests' true causes were overshadowed by coverage of antisemitism and police crackdowns. The Faculty of Arts and Sciences at Columbia condemned supposed inaccurate and discriminatory reporting of the protest. Deputy Editor Noah Bernstein of the Columbia Daily Spectator said that outside media coverage was generally slanted against the protesters. Students were reportedly weary of the media, with some refusing to be interviewed. The media was also criticized for its claims of outside agitators at the protests, which has been called misinformation.

Columbia's campus radio station WKCR-FM partially suspended its usual programming to cover the demonstrations. The station was applauded for its coverage of the situation, especially during the second raid. NBC News said WKCR was praised for its live coverage of the event. Business Insider praised the anchors' professionalism during the raid. The Guardian called the radio broadcast "chaotic and thrilling". The Nation said the student journalists were better than most mainstream media outlets. Other student journalists were also praised for their coverage, including at the Spectator.

Investigative reporters for the Washington Post discovered that New York Mayor Eric Adams participated in a group chat with a group of pro-Israel billionaires with close ties to Israeli cabinet officials and ambassadors who discussed hiring private investigators to "handle" the protest and trying to pressure Columbia's president and trustees to cooperate with Adams and the NYPD.

The 2025 documentary The Encampments, directed by Michael T. Workman and Kei Pritsker and produced by Macklemore and BreakThrough News with Watermelon Pictures, focuses on the encampments at Columbia University.

=== Restrictions ===
Early on April 30, Columbia suspended press access to campus, and said only identified students and essential personnel would be allowed in. In preparation to enter the campus, the NYPD closed multiple streets in and around the campus, the administration locked down Hamilton Hall, and all freedom of movement was restricted. In an op-ed for The New York Times, Mara Gay wrote that, because of these restrictions, journalists were unable to fully assess what occurred during the second raid and could not verify allegations of police brutality. Moreover, WKCR and other student journalists were not allowed to leave their building due to threat of arrest. Some outside journalists were pushed off campus or threatened if they approached the scene. Jake Offenhartz of the Associated Press called it "one of the most frustrating nights for press access I've experienced as a reporter". In August 2024, a student journalist with the Columbia Daily Spectator said that after she reported on the encampment, Columbia University opened an investigation into her "alleged involvement" with it.

== Analysis ==
According to Timothy Kaufman-Osborn, "Columbia is legally organized as an autocratic corporation whose foremost imperative is to guarantee the security of the property held in its name" and the administration's decision to issue interim suspensions to student protesters and invite the NYPD onto campus to then arrest them en masse for trespassing was a decision made in order to maintain its "commitment to amass and secure its privatized property."

According to Jason Brownlee, Minouche Shafik's invocation of Title VI of the Civil Rights Act of 1964 in her April 29, 2024 statement was legally incoherent but provided "shield and sword for her actions as university president" to justify "pitting cops against demonstrators." Brownlee writes that "Shafik and her peers sought to wrap their suppression of pro-Palestine advocacy in the mantle of America’s civil rights traditions", and thereby "denied pro-Palestine groups’ claim to civil rights of their own."

== In popular culture ==
The actions taken against the demonstrators by the NYPD in riot armor while clearing Hamilton Hall inspired Macklemore's song "Hind's Hall", whose lyrics call the police "actors in badges". In June, the criminal charges against most of the participants in the occupation of Hamilton Hall were dropped. Before and after the encampment, Jewish students sued the university, alleging civil rights and university policy violations due to harassment and abuse of Jewish students. One lawsuit was settled. Pro-Palestinian students also sued the university, claiming civil rights and university policy violations in connection with the university's actions against the protesters.

The Gaza Solidarity Encampment at Columbia University was featured in the 2025 documentary film The Encampments.
