= Intifada on the Hudson =

Intifada on the Hudson: How Israel Is Losing the Young People of the West
- Author: Ofir Dayan
- Language: English
- Publisher: Yedioth Books, Gefen Publishing House
- Publication date: 2025

Intifada on the Hudson: How Israel Is Losing the Young People of the West (Hebrew: אינתיפאדה על ההדסון – איך ישראל מאבדת את צעירי המערב, romanized: Intifada al HaHadason – Eich Yisra'el Me'abedet et Tsa'iri HaMa'arav) is a book written by Ofir Dayan and published in August 2025 by Yedioth Books. It was published in English, as "Intifada Globalized", by Gefen Publishing House.

== Summary ==
The book deals with the cultural, ideological, and political effects of the events that followed the 7 October massacre of 2023 on attitudes toward the State of Israel and the Jewish people in the United States and in Western countries generally, and especially on academic campuses.

The book examines the shift in public opinion among young people in the West toward Israel, and analyzes how Jews and Israel came to be seen as privileged oppressors rather than an admired "underdog".

In addition, the book describes how the word "Zionist" became a slur in the eyes of educated, liberal young people, and presents the strategic challenges Israel faces in winning public support in the West. Dayan, who served as president of the Students Supporting Israel chapter at Columbia University, analyzes these trends on the basis of her experience, her research, and interviews.

== Reception ==
The book was discussed in articles and interviews in the print and broadcast media, as well as at conferences and on podcasts, including a webinar of the Israel Defense and Security Forum (Habithonistim), and on the podcasts Geekonomy, "Unpopular Opinion", and Steimatzky.

== See also ==
- Gaza war protests at universities
- Universities and antisemitism
- Public diplomacy (Israel)
