= Ofir Dayan (publicist) =

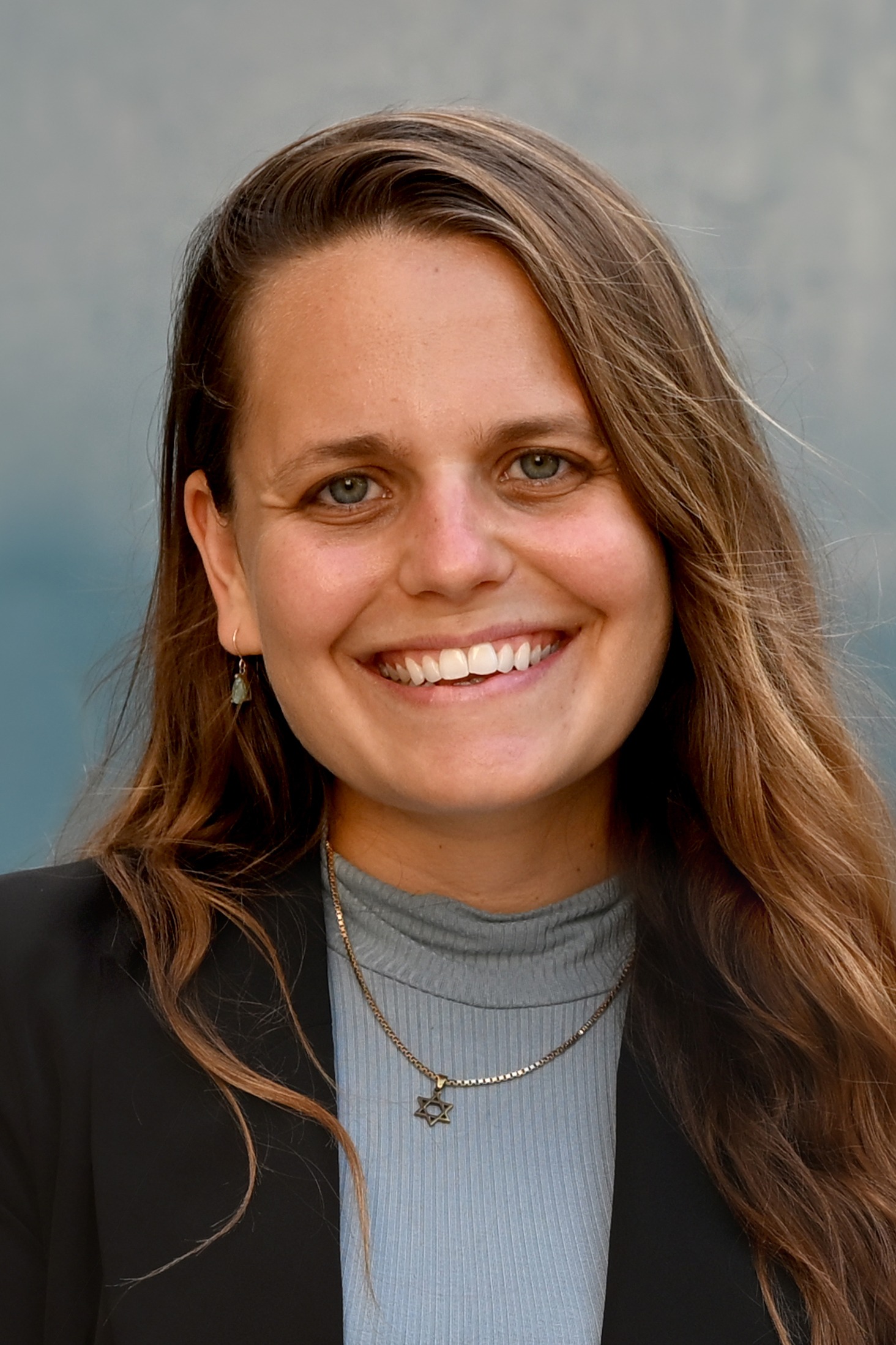
- Born: 23 April 1994 (age 32); Ma'ale Shomron
- Education: BA and MA, Columbia University, New York, United States
- Occupations: Policy researcher INSS, columnist
- Employer(s): Institute for National Security Studies (INSS), Makor Rishon
- Spouse: Din Tzadok (m. 2024)
- Father: Dani Dayan
- Awards: Major General's Certificate of Excellence from the Head of the Operations Directorate for her service in Operation Protective Edge (2014); Jabotinsky Institute Prize for Outstanding Research (2019); Named to the J100 list of the American-Jewish newspaper Algemeiner Journal (2019); Columbia University Service Award (2020, 2021); Dvorah Forum Young Leadership Award (2024)
- Website: Ofir Dayan's channel on YouTube

Ofir Dayan (Hebrew: אופיר דיין; born 23 April 1994) is an Israeli publicist and researcher at the Institute for National Security Studies (INSS), specializing in antisemitism and the delegitimization of Israel, as well as in geopolitics and Israel's standing in the world. She writes a weekly column in the newspaper Makor Rishon and is a lecturer and commentator on policy and security affairs in Israeli and foreign media. She led pro-Israel organizations on campuses in the United States. Her book Intifada on the Hudson: How Israel Is Losing the Young People of the West was published by Yedioth Books in August 2025.

== Biography and public activity ==
Dayan was born on 23 April 1994 and grew up in Ma'ale Shomron during the period of the Al-Aqsa Intifada. She is the daughter of Einat and Dani Dayan. Einat Dayan is a member of the council of the Second Authority for Television and Radio and a company director, and formerly headed the strategy and marketing division at Ariel University. Dani Dayan is the chairman of Yad Vashem, and formerly chairman of the Yesha Council and Consul General of Israel in New York.

She studied in the science track at Herzog High School in Kfar Saba. During high school she carried out several research projects, including a final thesis that took her to the finals of the national Young Scientists competition.

In the Betar youth movement she served as a counselor, a ma'oz (branch) commander, and an instructor in the counselors' course. Before her military service she volunteered for a year of service on behalf of the Betar movement, during which she lived in a service apartment in Nazareth Illit (today Nof HaGalil) and also volunteered in Beit She'an, Ma'ale Efrayim, and the northern Shomron.

She was active in "Beyadenu – For the Temple Mount".

=== Military service ===
She served as an officer in field positions in the IDF Spokesperson's Unit in both compulsory and career service, and was awarded a Major General's Certificate of Excellence by Yoav Har-Even, Head of the Operations Directorate, for her performance in Operation Protective Edge, during which she served as the spokesperson of the 188th Brigade, which fought in Shuja'iyya, under Brigadier General Tomer Yifrach.

In 2014 she completed the officers' course and served as spokesperson of the 80th Division under the division commander Rafi Milo.

During the Iron Swords war she served in the reserves as an officer with the rank of captain, as spokesperson of the 252nd "Sinai" Division, which fought in Beit Hanoun, under the command of Brigadier General Moran Omer.

=== Studies ===
Between 2017 and 2022, as part of an accelerated honors track, she completed two academic degrees – a bachelor's degree in international relations and a master's degree in international security policy at Columbia University in New York. During her studies she served as president of the campus chapter of Students Supporting Israel (SSI). She also spent a summer semester studying in Jordan.

During her studies she served as an adviser to the U.S. State Department, as a teaching assistant in a graduate-level conflict management course at SIPA, Columbia University's school of international affairs, and as an intern at the Institute for National Security Studies (INSS) and at the Israeli Ministry of Culture and Sport.

In 2024 Dayan began her doctoral studies at the University of Haifa, under the joint supervision of Prof. Ami Pedahzur and Prof. Eli Avraham.

==== Academic publications ====
- Dayan, O. (2025). Intifada on the Hudson: Why Young Westerners are Turning Away from Israel. Yedioth Books.
- Dayan, O., Pedahzur, A. (2025). Territorial Control and the Militarization of Violent Non-State Actors: Transformation, Opportunities, and Vulnerabilities, Studies in Conflict & Terrorism, 1–26.
- Dayan, O. (2022). With a Little Help from my Friends: A Gulf States Model for U.S. Facilitated Cooperation Among Adversaries. Michigan Journal of Public Affairs 19, 2022.
- Dayan, O. (2020). The Voters on the Hills: Campaign Promises regarding Judea and Samaria and their Effect on the Voting Patterns of the Israeli Citizens in these Regions. National Resilience, Politics and Society 2(2):83–101.

=== Professional activity ===
Dayan is a researcher at the Institute for National Security Studies (INSS). She established the institute's antisemitism and delegitimization research program and heads it. Previously she was a researcher at the institute's Glazer Israel–China Policy Center.

Her publications include: "A Chinese Influence Campaign against Israel", "A Friend in Need – Israel–Taiwan Relations during the 'Swords of Iron' War", and "Broadcasting to the Public: China's Efforts to Influence Israeli Public Opinion". She previously worked as a strategy consultant at Deloitte Israel.

In the summer of 2026 Dayan began teaching the course "Jewish and Israel Public Advocacy" in the master's program of the international school of Ariel University.

=== Media activity ===
Dayan has published opinion pieces and commentary in Israeli media outlets, including Israel Hayom, Haaretz, Yedioth Ahronoth, Ynet, and Arutz Sheva, and is interviewed on security, foreign policy, Israel's standing in the world, and international relations in Israeli media and international media.

She writes a weekly column in Makor Rishon, and previously wrote columns in Yedioth Ahronoth and Israel Hayom. Her columns include "Who Is to Blame for the Hunger in Gaza?", "Lessons from the Success of the Operation in Iran", and "Israel's Handling of the Gaza Flotilla".

Dayan takes part in public diplomacy efforts in the international arena and works to advance Israel's positions on campuses and in public forums. In this context she faced harassment and threats from anti-Israel activists during her studies in the United States.

=== Social activity ===
Dayan is a board member of the Dvorah Forum, an organization of women in foreign policy and national security.

For years she volunteered with "Comeback", a nonprofit for the rehabilitation of former offenders, with "Beyadenu – For the Temple Mount", and with several other nonprofit organizations.

== Awards and recognition ==
- In 2014 she was awarded a Major General's Certificate of Excellence by the Head of the Operations Directorate for her performance in Operation Protective Edge, when she served as spokesperson of the 188th Brigade.
- Named to the Dean's List in every year of her studies at Columbia University, 2017–2022.
- Won the Jabotinsky Institute Prize for Outstanding Research for 2019.
- Named to the J100 list of the American-Jewish newspaper Algemeiner Journal for 2019, the 100 people positively influencing Jewish life.
- Selected as Students Supporting Israel (SSI) outstanding activist for 2020.
- Columbia University Service Award, 2020 and 2021.
- Dvorah Forum Young Leadership Award for 2024.

== Personal life ==
Ofir Dayan married Din Tzadok on 27 September 2024. Tzadok is a doctoral student in computer science at the Technion and the son of the economist Erez Tzadok.
