= Naor Bitton =

Israeli activist

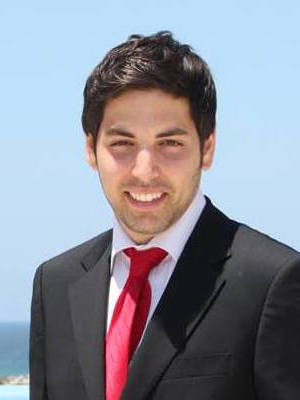
Naor R. Bitton

Naor Reuven Bitton (Hebrew: נאור ראובן ביטון) is an Israeli political activist and community leader. He is a Fulbright Scholar and was one of the founders of the international advocacy organization Students Supporting Israel (SSI), that has dozens of pro-Israel groups across US and Canadian campuses. Bitton published numerous op-eds concerning the State of Israel in American and Israeli news outlets.

== Personal life ==
Naor Bitton was born and raised in Ashdod. After finishing his mandatory military service in the Israeli Defense Forces, he founded an activists youth group called "Ashdod Mitoreret" (Ashdod Wakes-up). After being elected to chair the group, Bitton initiated and led Ashdod's demonstrations, calling for a more affordable cost of living for young Israelis. Those demonstrations were part of the 2011 Israeli social justice protests . During the protests, thousands of Ashdod's residents marched throughout the city while Bitton and two fellow activists created a "tent city" in one of the city's park.

Following the protests, Bitton went on to study a master's degree in Public Policy in the US, during which, he interned as an adviser for Congressman Jared Polis (D) of Colorado. In addition, he interned as a Cabinet Adviser to the Governor of Minnesota - Mark Dayton.

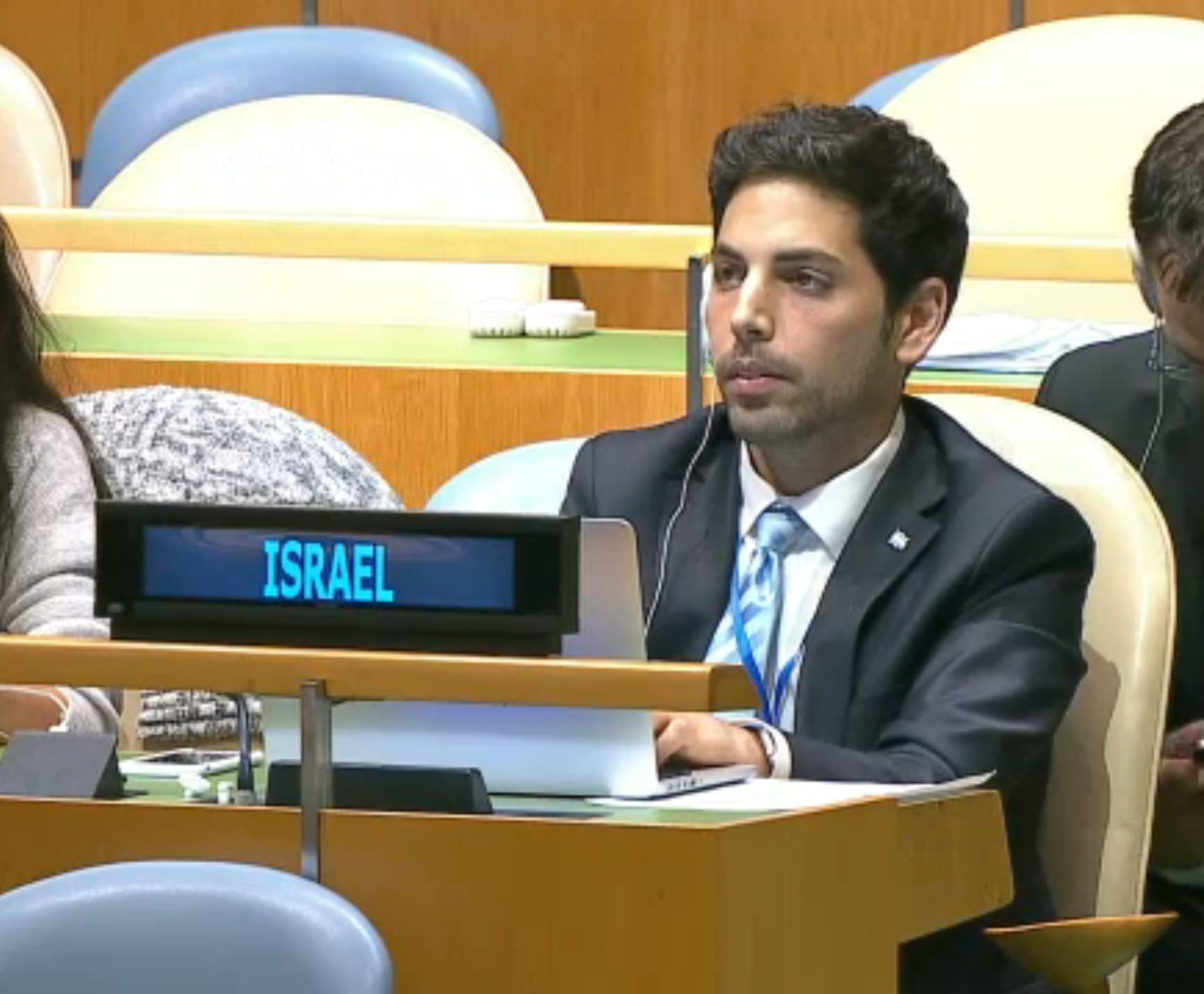
Bitton in Israel's seat at the United Nations General Assembly

Following his graduation, Bitton interned and later worked for Israel's Mission to United Nations as an adviser to Ambassador Ron Prosor. He also represented Israel in General Assembly discussions and UN deliberations.

Bitton wrote multiple op-eds about Israel in leading news sites and papers, including: the Jerusalem Post, Times of Israel, Star Tribune, Ynetnews, etc.

He comes from a family of well-known art and Intellectual figures. Bitton is related to the poet and Israel Prize winner Erez Bitton, and his uncle is the Israeli comedian Israel Katorza.

== Fighting against the Boycott Movement ==
During his studies at the University of Minnesota, Bitton co-founded Students Supporting Israel (SSI) together with Ilan Sinelnikov and Valeria Chazin. SSI is a network of pro-Israel groups that came under one name and one leadership, for the first time. The organization is focused on fighting the BDS (Boycott, Divestment & Sanctions) campaign against Israel. Using a grassroots approach SSI was able to pass multiple pro-Israel resolutions in student governments.
