= Carlos J. Alonso =

Literary scholar and academic administrator

Academic work
- Discipline: Literature

Carlos J. Alonso is the Morris A. and Alma Schapiro Professor in the Humanities, Dean of the Graduate School of Arts and Sciences, and Vice President for Graduate Education at Columbia University.

== Education and career ==
Alonso received his B.A. in Spanish and Latin American Literature at Cornell and his M.A. and Ph.D. in Latin American Literature at Yale. Alonso became Dean of the Graduate School of Arts and Sciences in 2011. Prior to joining Columbia's faculty, Alonso was the Edwin B. and Leonore R. Williams Professor of Romance Languages at the University of Pennsylvania, where he received the Lindback Award for Distinguished Teaching. From 2000 to 2003, he was editor of the Publications of the Modern Language Association (PMLA), a top journal of literary criticism and theory.

== Research ==
Alonso is a specialist in the cultural production and intellectual history of Latin America in the 19th and 20th centuries. He has also written on the connection between research and teaching at research universities such as Columbia.

== Selected publications ==
- The Spanish American Regional Novel: Modernity and Autochthony. Cambridge University Press: 1990.
- The Burden of Modernity: The Rhetoric of Cultural Discourse in Spanish America. Oxford University Press: 1998.
- Julio Cortázar: New Readings (ed.). Cambridge University Press: 1998.
