= Students Supporting Israel =

Zionist student activist group

- Formation: 2012; 14 years ago
- Founders: Ilan Sinelnikov; Valeria Chazin; Naor Bitton
- Type: 501(c)(3) non-profit
- Purpose: Pro-Israel grassroots activism clubs
- Headquarters: Minneapolis
- Leaders: Valeria Chazin; Ilan Sinelnikov; Naor Bitton
- Website: www.ssimovement.org

Students Supporting Israel (SSI) is a pro-Israel, Zionist college advocacy based organization in North America. Founded in 2012 at the University of Minnesota by Ilan Sinelnikov, Valeria Chazin, and Naor Bitton, SSI has grown into an international movement. In March 2014, Indiana University and DePaul University students registered SSI chapters on their campuses, and the Toronto Metropolitan University (previously Ryerson University) opened an SSI club in April. By October, SSI was approved as a 501(c)(3) non-profit organization and operated on 27 campuses.

SSI's stated mission is "to be a clear and confident pro-Israel voice on college campuses and to support students in grassroots pro-Israel advocacy."

SSI is not structured as a fellowship or short-term program but as a network of university-recognized student organizations, each formally registered as a campus club under the student-activities framework of its respective institution. Chapters operate across universities in North America, Europe, and other regions, with student leaders coordinating events, campaigns, and educational programs under the umbrella of the national 501(c)(3) non-profit organization headquartered in Minneapolis, Minnesota.

== History ==
Founded in 2012, Students Supporting Israel (SSI) developed a model focused on strengthening a pro-Israel presence on campus through education, programming, and participation in student government processes. Recognizing the role that student governments play in shaping campus policy and opinion, SSI launched the Student Government Israel Alliance Initiative to train and support student leaders who engage with resolutions and legislation related to Israel and antisemitism.

Between 2014 and 2023, SSI and its campus chapters reported supporting students who advanced more than 30 resolutions in student governments in the United States, Canada, and elsewhere. These bills typically affirmed support for academic exchange with Israel, opposed the Boycott, Divestment and Sanctions (BDS) movement, or called for adoption of the International Holocaust Remembrance Alliance (IHRA) working definition of antisemitism.

At Duke University, a decision by the student body president in November 2021 to veto recognition of an SSI chapter led to national attention; the student senate recognized the chapter in February 2022.

In November 2023, the Associated Students Senate at the University of California, Santa Barbara passed a resolution condemning Hamas following the October 7 attacks; the action and subsequent campus debate were reported on by student and community outlets.

=== Student government actions ===
- 2017 – Ryerson University (Canada): student union adopted a definition of antisemitism following campus organizing; covered by The Algemeiner.
- 2020 – Arizona State University: Undergraduate Student Government resolution in support of Jewish and pro-Israel students (reported by SSI).
- 2021 & 2023 – University of California, Santa Barbara: resolutions related to Israel issues, including condemnation of Hamas in 2023; covered by campus and community media.

== Programs and events ==
SSI organizes educational and advocacy-oriented programming across its campus chapters, ranging from interfaith initiatives to public awareness campaigns. The organization states that it emphasizes student-led engagement and campus dialogue relating to Israel, Zionism, and Middle-East affairs.

SSI's programming varies by campus and year, but these initiatives constitute core components of its educational and advocacy portfolio, alongside film screenings, cultural events, and leadership-training workshops.

=== Palestinian Apartheid Week ===
SSI chapters host an annual counter-initiative during campus events commonly known as "Israel Apartheid Week." Under the title "Palestinian Apartheid Week", SSI student leaders present information and public discussions highlighting what it purports to be discrimination and human-rights issues under the Palestinian Authority and Hamas rule in Gaza. The program is designed as a direct educational response to anti-Israel demonstrations on campus.

=== Breaking Bread ===
Launched in partnership with faith-based and inter-community organizations, the Breaking Bread series brings Jewish and Christian students together for dialogue and shared meals intended to foster understanding and cooperation around shared Zionist values.

=== Triggered: From Combat to Campus ===
The Triggered: From Combat to Campus speaker tour features current or former Israel Defense Forces (IDF) soldiers who visit universities to share personal experiences of military service, decision-making, and transition to civilian and academic life. The tour aims to give students first-hand perspectives on Israel's security environment and the challenges faced by young Israelis in combat, and to humanize IDF soldiers.

== Funding ==
Per 2024 tax filings, SSI earned $2,091,470 in revenue in 2024 (a 33.9% increase from 2023), of which, $1,979,391 (94.6%) came from outside contributions. The Milstein Family Foundation, a pro-Israeli advocacy non-profit, is one of SSI's donors.

== Reception ==
SSI's Triggered tour, which features Israeli Defense Force (IDF) soldiers giving speeches, has frequently drawn protests from university students, graduates, and others, who often cite war crimes committed by the IDF. Student protestors have stated that university administrations have platformed SSI, but refuse to do the same for pro-Palestinian student groups, like Students for Justice in Palestine. Students have also reported that university administrations have made it difficult to get counter-protests for SSI events approved. Other students have raised concerns that SSI events have endangered Muslim students, and students of Arab backgrounds.

== Recognition and awards ==
SSI has received several honors from Jewish and pro-Israel organizations for its campus activism. Commentator Ben Shapiro, U.S. Senator Rand Paul, and Congresswoman Elise Stefanik have each praised SSI's efforts to promote pro-Israel activism among students.

SSI representatives have also been invited to the White House on multiple occasions to participate in briefings and events concerning campus antisemitism and higher-education policy.

2024 – Medal of Valor, Simon Wiesenthal Center, recognizing SSI's grassroots student leadership.

2015 – Midwest Bridge Award, presented by the Consulate General of Israel to the Midwest for strengthening connections between Israel and regional communities.

2015 – Student Group of the Year, at the AIPAC Policy Conference, awarded to the SSI chapter at DePaul University.

2014 – MZ Student Activism Award, Zionist Organization of America (ZOA), acknowledging SSI's contributions to Zionist student engagement.

2013 – David Bar-Ilan Award for Campus Activism, presented by CAMERA (Committee for Accuracy in Middle East Reporting and Analysis).
