= Frederick Paul Keppel =

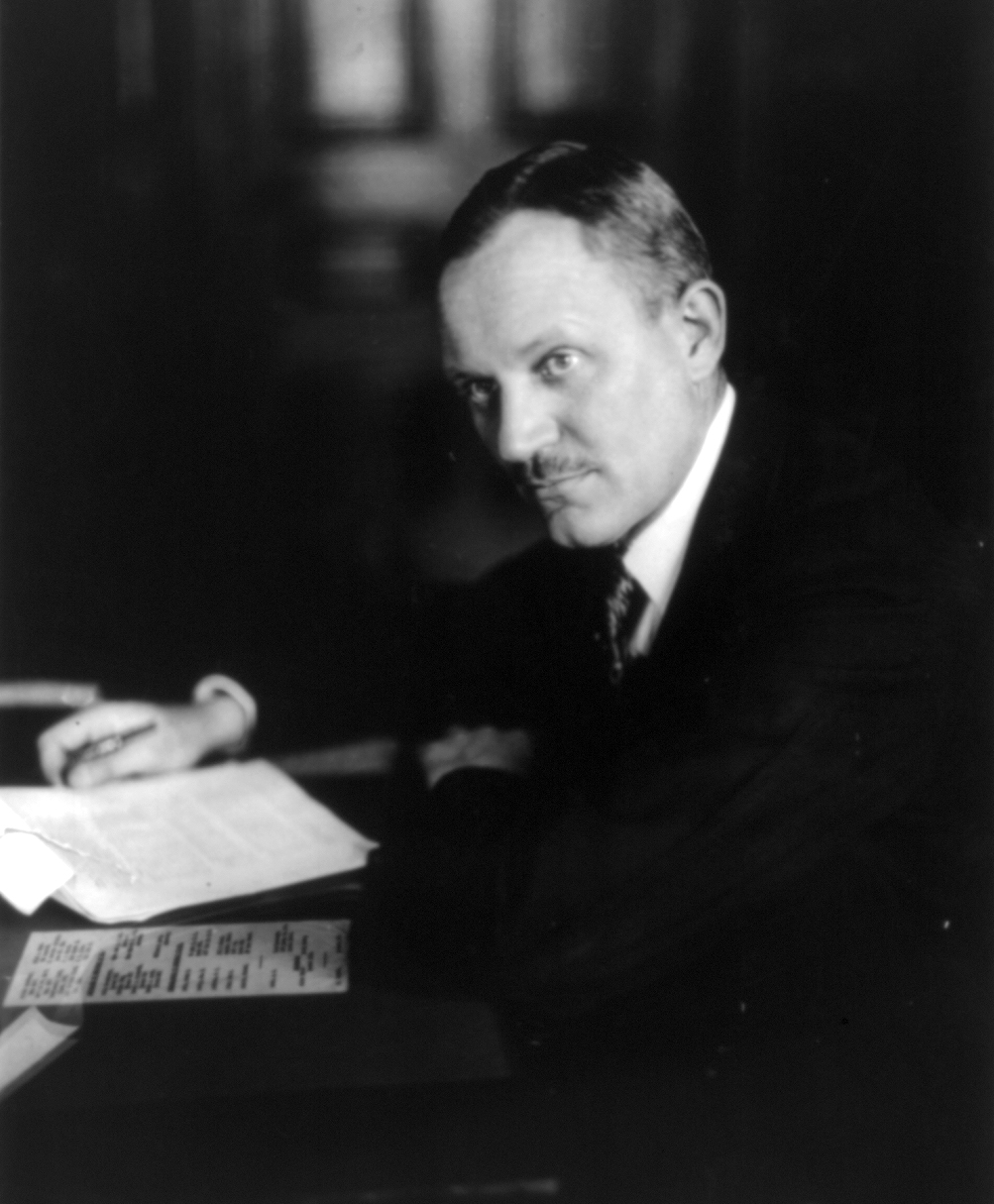

President of the Carnegie Corporation of New York
- In office 1923–1941
- Succeeded by: Charles Dollard

Dean of Columbia College
- In office 1910–1917
- Preceded by: John Howard Van Amringe
- Succeeded by: Herbert Hawkes

Personal details
- Born: July 2, 1875 Staten Island, New York, U.S.
- Died: September 8, 1943 (aged 68)
- Relations: Frederick Keppel (father)
- Education: Columbia University (BA)

Frederick Paul Keppel (July 2, 1875 – September 8, 1943) was an American educator and executive in the field of philanthropy. In education he served as dean of Columbia College, in government he served as Third Assistant Secretary of War, and in philanthropy he served as president of the Carnegie Corporation.

== Biography ==
=== Early life and education ===
Frederick Paul Keppel was born on Staten Island, New York City, New York, United States on July 2, 1875, into a family of Dutch and Irish ancestry. His father was the senior member of the international art firm Frederick Keppel and Company. Between high school and college, Keppel worked for his father's print dealing business. In 1898 he graduated with a Bachelor of Arts from Columbia University and later earned honorary doctorates from Columbia University, University of Pittsburgh, University of Michigan, Hamilton College, Union College, University of Toronto, and the University of Melbourne in Australia.

=== Early career ===
After his graduation in 1898 he had a brief experience in the editorial work of a publishing house, and then returned to Columbia University from 1910 to 1918, serving successively as assistant secretary, secretary, and dean of the college. During this period he wrote and published a book on Columbia University. From 1908 to 1918, he also served as secretary of the American Association for International Conciliation. In 1911 he was decorated by France as Chevalier (Knight) of the Order of the Légion d'honneur. Also in 1911, he helped found the New York Young Republican Club.

When World War I began, he moved to Washington, D.C. to assist in the war effort. He established himself as an unofficial adviser in the office of the Secretary of War and was soon assigned to the position of Third Assistant Secretary of War — a position created expressly for him. He served in this position from 1918 to 1919 until he was sent to France in 1920 to act first as the director of foreign operations of the American Red Cross. From 1920 to 1921, he served as commissioner for the United States to the International Chamber of Commerce. He then returned to the United States to become secretary of the Greater New York Planning Board, and in 1922, he was elected President of the Carnegie Corporation of New York.

=== Carnegie period ===
When Keppel became president of the Carnegie Corporation, it had not formulated a long-range program of action. Thus, Keppel was free, within the limits of the Corporation's charter, to develop a policy, a philosophy, and a program. He kept a small staff, and sought external help instead of employing experts within the Corporation. Keppel's annual reports at the Carnegie Corporation constitute an important contribution to the discussion of foundation policy. They have had a determining influence on the practice and philosophy of philanthropy as applied to intellectual and cultural needs and opportunities. (Note: Memoir presented to the American Council of Learned Societies at its annual meeting, 1944, and ordered to be included in the Proceedings of the meeting.) His comments and observations were of particular interest to the American Council of Learned Societies. Before the Association of American Colleges and Universities, in 1930, he insisted upon the importance to the United States of knowledge of Asian culture, and upon the necessity of including Asian languages in American curricula. During his presidency from 1922 to 1941, the Carnegie Corporation appropriated $86,000,000 to universities, colleges, museums, libraries, and scientific and educational studies. He was awarded Honorary Membership in the American Library Association in 1942 In 1999, American Libraries named him one of the "100 Most Important Leaders We Had in the 20th Century" thanks to $30 million in donations to libraries and library projects.

=== Late career ===
In 1941, Keppel retired from his role as president of the Carnegie Corporation to become the vice-president of the American Philosophical Society. In 1942 he was awarded American Library Association Honorary Membership. When America became involved in World War II, the President of the United States requested that he serve on the Board of Appeals on Visa Cases. He died on September 8, 1943, at the age of 68.

Academic offices
Preceded by John Howard Van Amringe	Dean of Columbia College; 1910–1917	Succeeded by Herbert Hawkes
