= Columbia College, Columbia University =

Oldest undergraduate college of Columbia University

Coordinates: 40.8079°N 73.9628°W

Columbia College
- Type: Private
- Established: 1754; 272 years ago
- Parent institution: Columbia University
- Dean: Josef Sorett
- Students: 4,500
- Location: New York City, United States
- Website: college.columbia.edu

Columbia College is the oldest undergraduate college of Columbia University, a private Ivy League research university in New York City. Established in 1754 as King's College on the grounds of Trinity Church in Manhattan, it is the oldest institution of higher learning in the state of New York and the fifth oldest in the United States.

Columbia was established as a colonial college by royal charter under George II of Great Britain. It was renamed Columbia College in 1784 following the American Revolution, and in 1787 was placed under a private board of trustees headed by alumni Alexander Hamilton and John Jay.

Columbia College is distinctive for its comprehensive Core Curriculum and is among the most selective of American colleges, with an admission rate of 3.85% in 2024.

== History ==
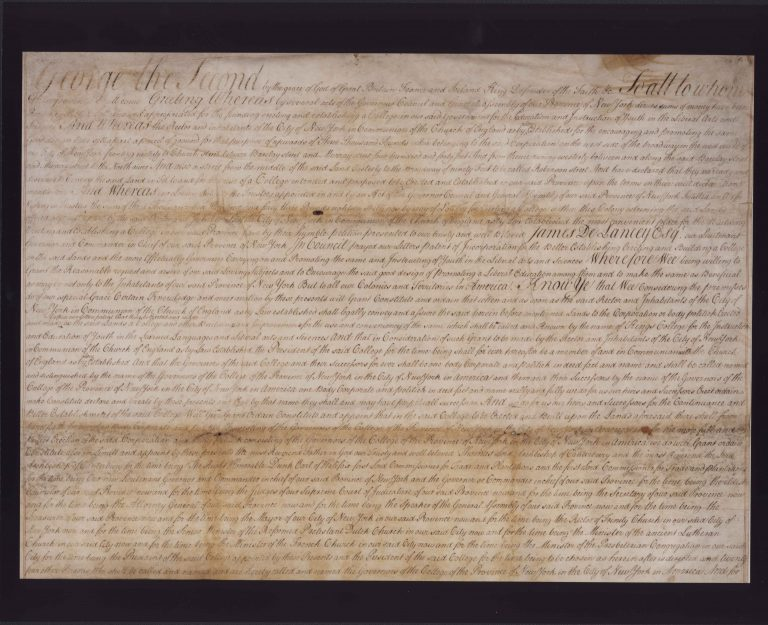
First skin of the Charter of King's College, 1754

Columbia College was founded as King's College in 1754 in the Province of New York by royal charter from King George II of Great Britain. Owing in part to the influence of the Church of England, a site was chosen for the new college within the churchyard of Trinity Church on Broadway opposite Wall Street in New York City. The college remained at this site for less than a decade.

The college chose Samuel Johnson to be its first president. He was also the college's first (and for a time only) professor. During this period, classes and examinations, both oral and written, were conducted entirely in Latin.

=== Park Place Campus ===
By 1760, Columbia had relocated from the Trinity Church site to one along Park Place, near the city commons and today's New York City Hall.

In 1767, Samuel Bard established a medical college at the school, now known as the Columbia University College of Physicians and Surgeons, which was the first medical school to grant the Doctor of Medicine (M.D.) degree in America.

Due to the American Revolutionary War, instruction was suspended from 1776 until 1784, but by the beginning of the war, the college had already educated some of the nation's foremost political leaders, such as Alexander Hamilton, who served as military aide to General George Washington, initiated and authored most of The Federalist Papers, and served as the first Secretary of the Treasury; John Jay, author of several of the Federalist Papers and the first Chief Justice of the United States; Robert Livingston, one of the Committee of Five who drafted the Declaration of Independence; and Gouverneur Morris, one of the Committee of Detail who finished the last draft of the United States Constitution.

Hamilton's first experience with the military came while a student during the summer of 1775, after the outbreak of fighting at Boston. Along with Nicholas Fish, Robert Troup, and a group of other students from King's College, he joined a volunteer militia company called the "Hearts of Oak" and achieved the rank of Lieutenant. They adopted distinctive uniforms, complete with the words "Liberty or Death" on their hatbands, and drilled under the watchful eye of a former British officer in the graveyard of the nearby St. Paul's Chapel. In August 1775, while under fire from HMS Asia, the Hearts of Oak (the "Corsicans") participated in a successful raid to seize cannon from the Battery, becoming an artillery unit thereafter. Ironically, in 1776 Captain Hamilton would engage in the Battle of Harlem Heights, which took place on and around the site that would later become home to his alma mater more than a century later, only to be entombed after his dueling death some years later at the original home of King's College in Trinity Church yard.

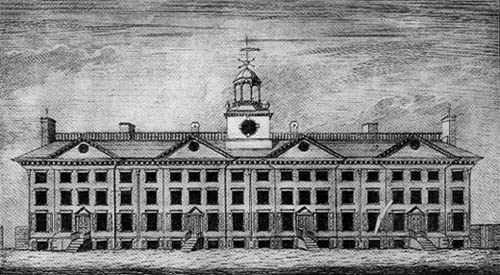
College Hall in 1790

With the successful Treaty of Paris in 1783, the domestic situation was stable enough for the college to resume classes in 1784. With the new nation's independence from the Kingdom of Great Britain, the name of the institution was changed from King's College to Columbia College, the name by which the institution continues to be known today. The college was briefly chartered as a state institution, lasting only until 1787, when due to a lack of public financial support the school was permitted to incorporate under a private board of trustees. This 1787 charter remains in effect. The renamed and reorganized college, located in the new national capital under the Constitution and free from its association with the Church of England, received students from a variety of denominations as a response to its growing reputation as one of the finest institutions of higher learning in the new nation.

=== Midtown Campus ===
Columbia was located at its Park Place campus near New York City Hall for nearly a century, from approximately 1760 to 1857, at which point the college moved to 49th Street and Madison Avenue in Manhattan.

During the college's forty years at this third location, in addition to granting the Bachelor of Arts and Doctor of Medicine degrees, the faculties of the college were expanded to include the Columbia Law School (founded 1858), the Columbia School of Mines (founded 1864, now known as the Fu Foundation School of Engineering and Applied Science). The Columbia School of Mines awarded the first Ph.D. from Columbia in 1875.

At this time, Columbia College was now not only the name of the original undergraduate college founded as King's College, but it also encompassed all of the other colleges and schools of the institution. (Though technically known as the "School of Arts", the undergraduate division was often called "The College proper" to avoid confusion.) After Seth Low became president of Columbia College in 1890, he advocated the division of the individual schools and colleges into their own semi-autonomous entities under the central administration of the university. The complexity of managing the institution had been further increased when Barnard College for Women became affiliated with Columbia in 1889 followed by Teachers College of Columbia University in 1891. Also by this time, graduate faculties issuing the Doctor of Philosophy (Ph.D.) degree in philosophy, political science, and the natural sciences had also developed.

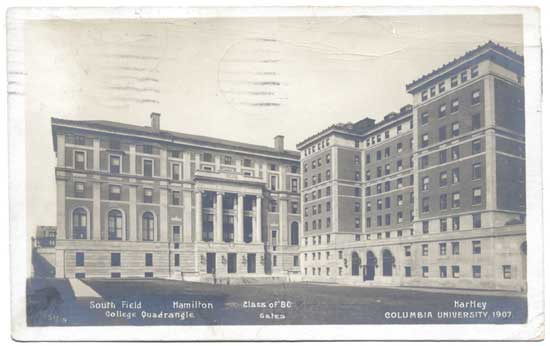
Hamilton Hall (left), new home of Columbia College, and Hartley Hall, the college's first dormitory, in 1907

Thus, in 1896, the trustees of Columbia College, under the guidance of Seth Low, approved a new name for the university as a whole, Columbia University in the City of New York. At this point, the name Columbia College returned to being used solely to refer to the original undergraduate college, founded as King's College in 1754 and renamed Columbia College in 1784.

=== Move to Morningside Heights ===
In addition to reclaiming the identity of Columbia College and making it the focus of the newly rearranged Columbia University, Low was also responsible for the monumental relocation of the university to its current location atop a hill in Morningside Heights in uptown Manhattan. A tract for the campus was purchased, which extended from 114th St. to 120th St. between Broadway and Amsterdam Avenue.

Charles McKim of McKim, Mead, and White was selected to design the new campus, which was to be patterned after the buildings of the Italian Renaissance. While most American universities at this point had followed more medieval and Gothic styles of architecture, the neoclassical style of the new Columbia University campus was meant to reflect the institution's roots in the Enlightenment and the spirit of intellectual discovery of the period. Columbia College and Columbia University as a whole relocated to the new campus in 1897.

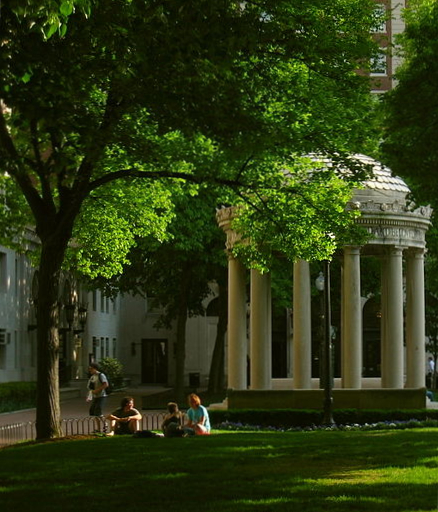
Van Amringe Quadrangle houses a memorial to John Howard Van Amringe, who served as the college's first dean after the formation of Columbia University

The academic history of traditions of Columbia College clearly had their beginnings in the classical education of the Enlightenment, and in this mold, the college's famous Core Curriculum was officially recognized and codified in 1919 with John Erskine's first seminar on the great books of the western tradition. Also in 1919, a course, War and Peace, was required of all Columbia College students in addition to the Great Books Honors Seminar.

During the 1960s, Columbia College, like many others across the United States, experienced unrest and turmoil due to the ongoing civil rights movement and opposition to the Vietnam War. On April 23, 1968, more than 1,000 students forcefully occupied five campus buildings in protest to the proposed expansion of the university's campus into Morningside Park and to protest the university's sponsorship of classified military research. University officials wished to build new gymnasium facilities in the park, which, while located directly adjacent to the university, is separated by a steep cliff. Plans to create separate entrances for students and local residents was the primary objection of the student protesters to the proposed expansion plan. A fence at the site was torn down, and police arrested one student, whose release became one of the demands of the protest. After five days, the functions of the university were brought to a halt, and early on the morning of April 30 the students were forcibly removed by the New York City Police Department. As a result of the student protests, the university president Grayson L. Kirk retired, classified research projects on campus were abruptly ended, long-standing ROTC programs were expelled, and the proposed expansion plans were canceled. The university experienced financial difficulties throughout the 1970s and early 1980s, and admissions standards in the college slightly relaxed to hasten the diversification of the student body following the 1968 protests. Paralleling a national trend after 1970, Columbia classes in the 1970s and 1980s, earned lower SAT scores than did Columbia students in the late 1960s. The scores were, however, similar to other Ivy schools except Harvard, Yale, and Princeton—a position not acceptable to Columbia's ambitious administration.

After two committees reported in 1980 and 1981 that the all-male college's competitiveness with other Ivy League universities was decreasing, women were admitted in 1983. The median SAT score of the class of 1991 was the highest since the early 1970s. In the 1980s and 1990s, the college experienced a drastic increase in gifts and endowment growth, propelling it from the periphery to the forefront of a university historically dominated by its graduate & professional schools. During the leadership of university presidents Michael Sovern and George Erik Rupp, many of Columbia College's facilities were extensively expanded and renovated. The number of residence halls was increased to accommodate all Columbia College students for all four years of the undergraduate education. Hamilton Hall, the primary academic building of Columbia College, has undergone extensive renovations, and the college's athletic facilities, located at Baker Field Athletics Complex on Manhattan's far northern tip at 218th Street, were renovated and expanded.

== Columbia College today ==
Columbia College bulletin

=== Admissions ===
Like other elite schools, Columbia has been attracting ever higher numbers of applicants, with a trend towards applicants applying to more than seven different institutions – an increasingly "scattershot approach" when compared to applications in the 1990s. Columbia College (including Columbia Engineering) has an admittance rate that places it among the most selective of American colleges. For the fall term of 2010, there were 26,178 applicants for 2,397 placements in the Class of 2014, for an acceptance rate of 9.16%. By the fall term of 2024, applications had more than doubled, with 60,248 applicants for 2,319 placements in the Class of 2028, for an acceptance rate of 3.85%.

=== Academics ===
Columbia College has long been known for its rigorous Core Curriculum, a series of mandatory classes and distribution requirements that form the heart of Columbia College students' academic experience.

Students are also required to pass a swimming test before receiving their diploma. The foreign language requirement, however, may be skipped if the student passes a placement exam or demonstrates requisite proficiency. Most students graduate within four years with a Bachelor of Arts degree.

=== Campus ===
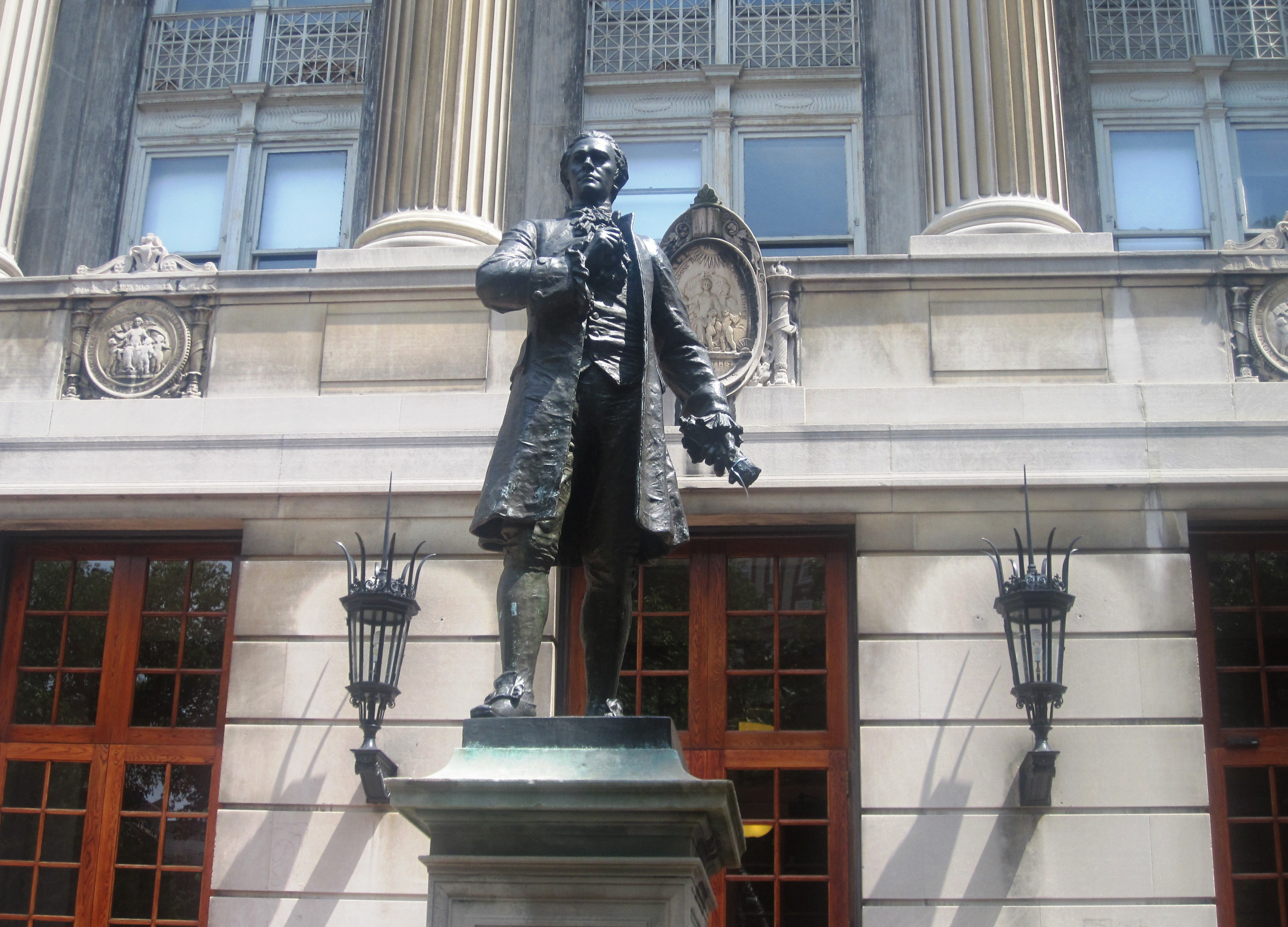
Hamilton Hall, home of the college, on the campus of Columbia University

Most of the college's facilities are located on Columbia University's Morningside Heights campus, especially in Hamilton Hall, which houses its administrative and admissions offices, as well as the directors of the Core Curriculum.

Butler Library, Columbia University's main library, is home to more than 2 million volumes of the university's humanities collection. The facility recently underwent an extensive four-year renovation, including the creation of a new wing, named Philip L. Milstein Family College Library in honor of its donor. Included is a specialized collection of approximately 100,000 volumes containing subject matter in history, literature, philosophy, and the social sciences specifically intended to complement the Columbia College curriculum. The collection of the Columbia University Libraries consists of more than 9.2 million volumes held in 25 specialized libraries as well as a digital library, however Columbia College students do not have unlimited access to all specialized libraries.

Students at Columbia College are guaranteed campus housing for four years. Residence halls, which also house undergraduate students of Columbia's engineering school, are either located on the Morningside Heights main campus or within 10 blocks of the 116th Street entrance. First-year students are housed on the main quad in John Jay, Carman, Wallach, Hartley and Furnald Halls.

The two main dining facilities are John Jay Dining Hall and Ferris Booth Commons; all freshmen are required to have a full meal plan. Other school dining facilities available on the Morningside Heights campus are located in the recently remodeled student center, Alfred Lerner Hall, Faculty House, and Uris Hall.

=== Governance ===
In 2009, Michele Moody-Adams became the first woman and first African American to be Dean of the college.

In 2011, after the resignation of Michele Moody-Adams, James Valentini replaced her as Dean of Columbia College. The students of Columbia College elect the Columbia College Student Council (CCSC) to serve as their primary representative, advocate, and liaison to the Columbia University community, including its administration, faculty, alumni and students, as well as to the public.

The college's board of visitors is an independent and self-governing advisory body composed of college alumni and parents. The board advocates for the interest of the college among the Columbia community, New York city and beyond. It also provides advice to the dean in identifying and addressing both immediate challenges and short-and long-term opportunities for the college. Members of the board currently include ZhenFund CEO Anna Fang, JP Morgan Chase global head of research Joyce Chang, Virtu Financial CEO Doug Cifu, Academy Award-winning producer Dede Gardner, former NYC Commissioner for Consumer and Worker Protection Peter Hatch, USRowing Chairman and president Nobuhisa Ishizuka, HEICO co-president Eric Mendelson, Sixth Street Partners co-founder Vijay Mohan, Warner Bros. General Counsel John Rogovin, Morgan Stanley's global head of technology Robert Rooney, HNA Group CEO Tan Xiangdong, former FTC Commissioner Mozelle W. Thompson, Happy Family CEO Shazi Visram, and hedge fund manager William von Mueffling.

Former members of the board count among them PBS president Lawrence K. Grossman, Thomson Reuters CEO Tom Glocer, hedge fund manager Mark E. Kingdon, Bain Capital co-managing partner Jonathan Lavine, Univision CFO Frank Lopez-Balboa, airline investor Frank Lorenzo, real estate developer Philip L. Milstein, H.I.G. Capital founder Sami Mnaymneh, KKR executive Alex Navab, C-SPAN co-founder Robert Rosencrans, Tishman Speyer CEO Rob Speyer, healthcare entrepreneur Daniel E. Straus.

== List of Deans of Columbia College ==
1. 1896–1910 John Howard Van Amringe
2. 1910–1917 Frederick Paul Keppel
3. 1918–1943 Herbert Hawkes
4. 1943–1950 Harry J. Carman
5. 1950–1958 Lawrence Henry Chamberlain
6. 1958–1962 John Gorham Palfrey
7. 1963–1967 David B. Truman
8. 1967–1968 Henry S. Coleman (interim)
9. 1968–1972 Carl Hovde
10. 1972–1976 Peter Pouncey
11. 1976–1977 Robert L. Belknap (acting)
12. 1977–1982 Arnold Collery
13. 1982–1989 Robert Pollack
14. 1989–1993 Jack Greenberg
15. 1993–1995 Steven Marcus
16. 1995–2009 Austin Quigley
17. 2009–2011 Michele Moody-Adams
18. 2011–2022 James J. Valentini
19. 2022–present Josef Sorett

== Noted people ==
Many eminent individuals have attended or taught at Columbia College or King's College, its predecessor.

Among those College alumni categorized as "remarkable" by the university during its 250th anniversary celebrations in 2004 were Founding Fathers of the United States Alexander Hamilton, John Jay, and Gouverneur Morris (author of Preamble to the U.S. Constitution, "We, The People"). Other political figures in this group include statesman and educator Nicholas Murray Butler, New York Governor DeWitt Clinton, U.S. Secretary of State Hamilton Fish, South African anti-apartheid leader Pixley ka Isaka Seme, Chinese diplomat Wellington Koo, many New York City mayors, including Seth Low and John Purroy Mitchel, as well as spymaster William Joseph Donovan.

Academics listed include philosophers Mortimer Adler and Irwin Edman, historians Jacques Barzun and Alfred Thayer Mahan, economist Arthur Burns, paleontologist Niles Eldredge, drama scholar Brander Matthews, art historian Meyer Schapiro and literary critic Lionel Trilling.

Public intellectuals and journalists, including broadcaster Roone Arledge, social critic Randolph Bourne, environmentalist Barry Commoner, and writers like Henry Demarest Lloyd and Norman Podhoretz are also prominent on the list. Major publishers included were Alfred Knopf, Arthur Sulzberger, and Bennett Cerf. Rabbi Stephen Wise is also considered prominent.

Columbia College graduates recognized in the arts include pianist Emanuel Ax, actor James Cagney, musician Art Garfunkel, composers Richard Rodgers and John Corigliano, lyricists Oscar Hammerstein II and Lorenz Hart, playwrights Samuel Spewack, Tony Kushner and Terrence McNally, writers Jack Kerouac, Allen Ginsberg, Herman Wouk, John Berryman, Thomas Merton, Clement Clarke Moore, Ben Coes, and Clifton Fadiman, screenwriter Herman Mankiewicz, filmmaker Joseph Mankiewicz, sculptor Isamu Noguchi, and violinist Gil Shaham.

Architects James Renwick Jr., Robert A.M. Stern, engineer William Barclay Parsons, baseball player Lou Gehrig, football player Sid Luckman, and business leader John Kluge were also Columbia College students.

Additionally, highly visible former Columbia College students in recent years include former President Barack Obama, former United States Attorneys General William Barr, Michael Mukasey and Eric Holder, New York Governor David Paterson, New Hampshire Senator Judd Gregg, former New Jersey Governor Jim McGreevey, Los Angeles Mayor Eric Garcetti, Texas Congressman Beto O'Rourke, New York Congressman Jerry Nadler, Estonian president Toomas Hendrik Ilves, political advisor and commentator George Stephanopoulos, actors Maggie Gyllenhaal, Jake Gyllenhaal, Anna Paquin, Casey Affleck, Amanda Peet, Matthew Fox, Timothée Chalamet, George Segal, Julia Stiles, Cinta Laura, and Kate McKinnon, radio personality Max Kellerman, directors Jim Jarmusch, Brian De Palma, Sidney Lumet and Bill Condon, television showrunners Jenji Kohan and Beau Willimon, writer Paul Auster, historian Eric Foner, and the chart-topping alt-rock band Vampire Weekend.

Among its graduates and attendees, Columbia College can count at least 16 Nobel Prize winners, 8 Emmy Award winners, 8 Tony Award winners, over 20 Academy Award winners, and 40 Pulitzer Prize winners.

Notable Columbia College alumni include:

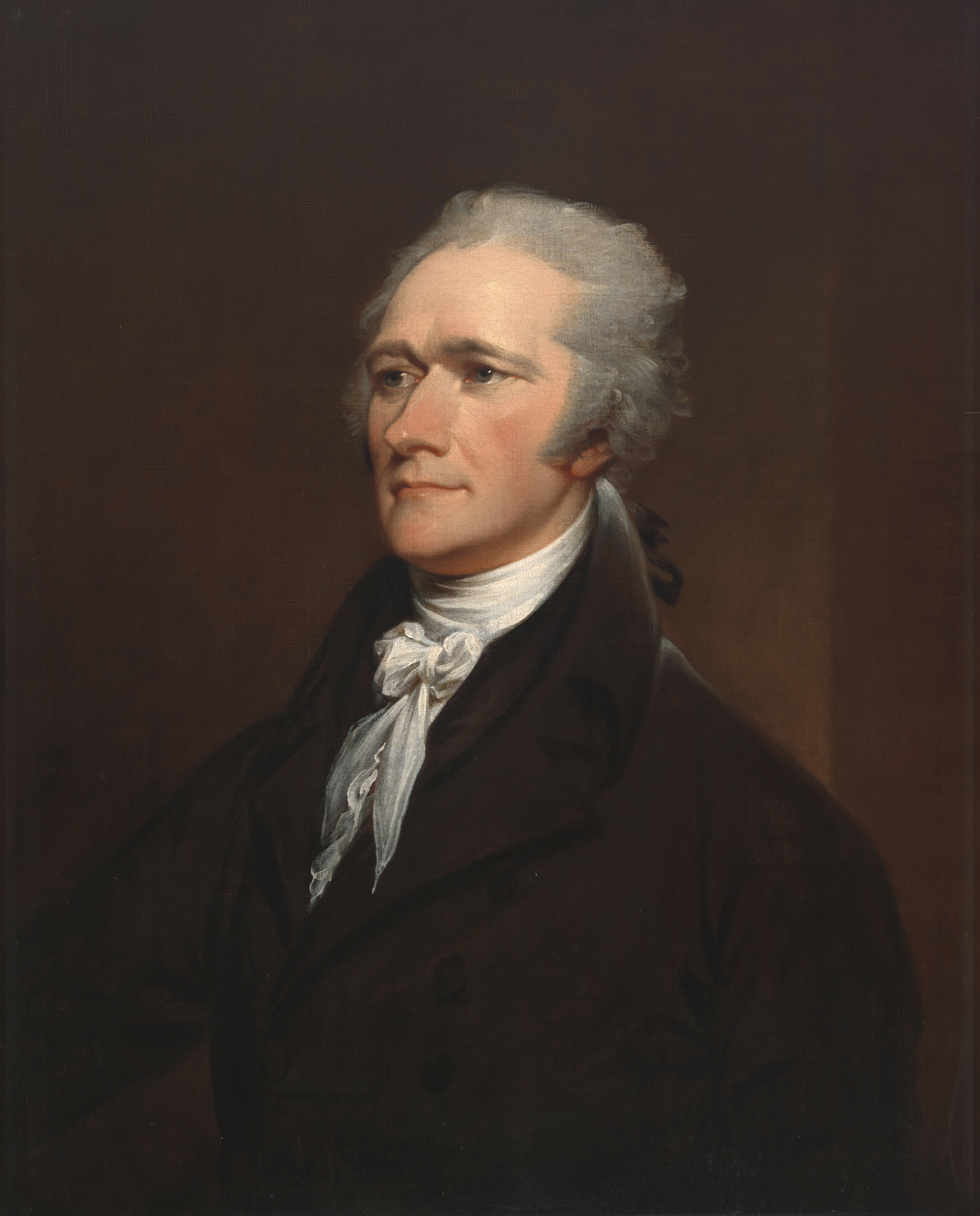
Alexander Hamilton, Founding Father of the United States; author of The Federalist Papers; 1st United States Secretary of the Treasury

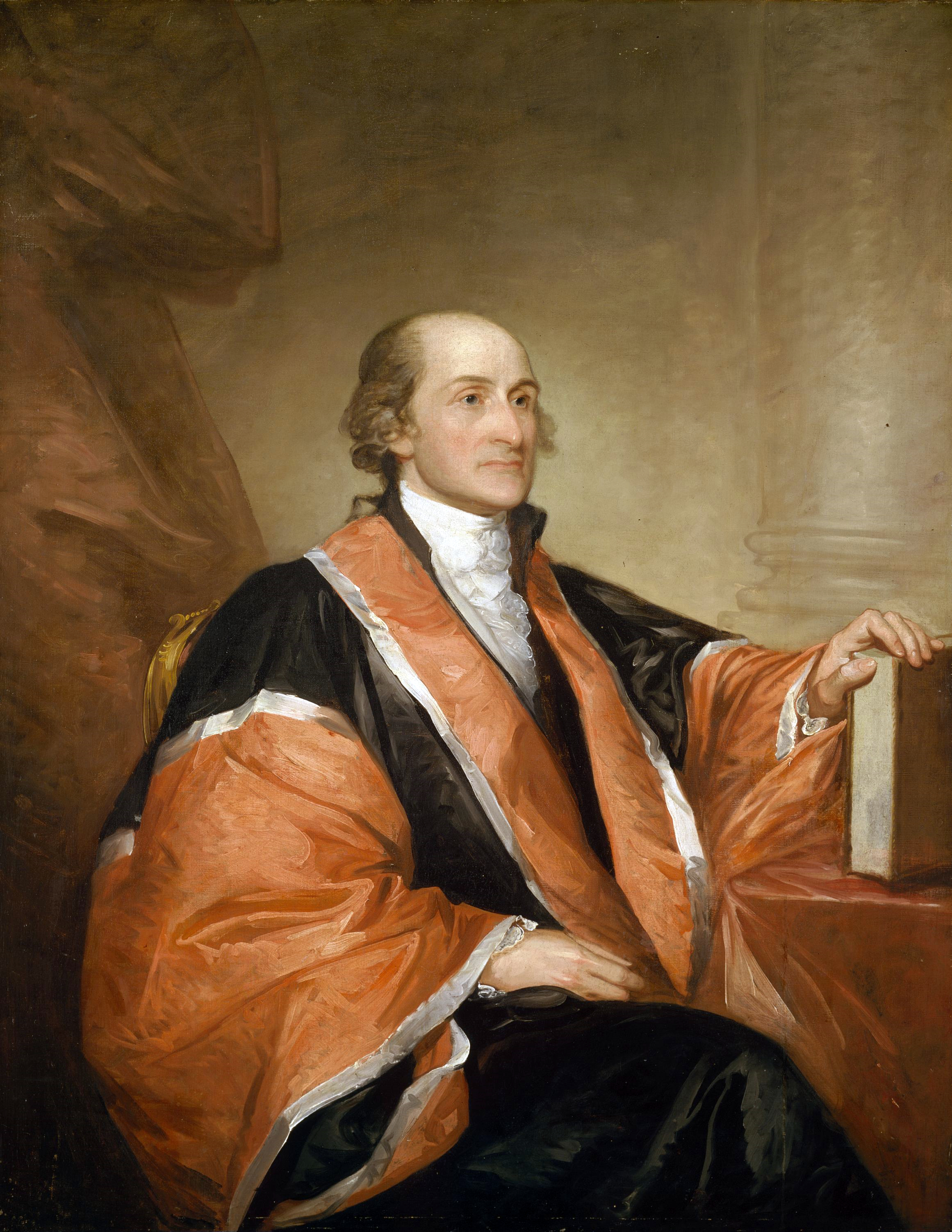
John Jay, Founding Father of the United States; author of The Federalist Papers; 1st Chief Justice of the United States; 2nd Governor of New York

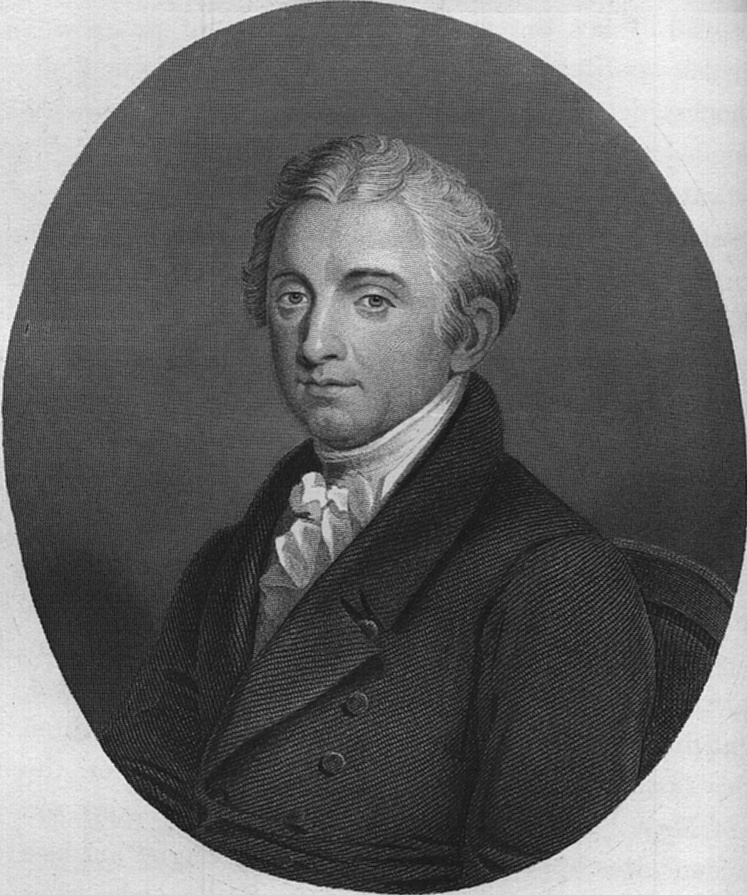
Gouverneur Morris, Founding Father of the United States; author of the United States Constitution; United States Senator from New York

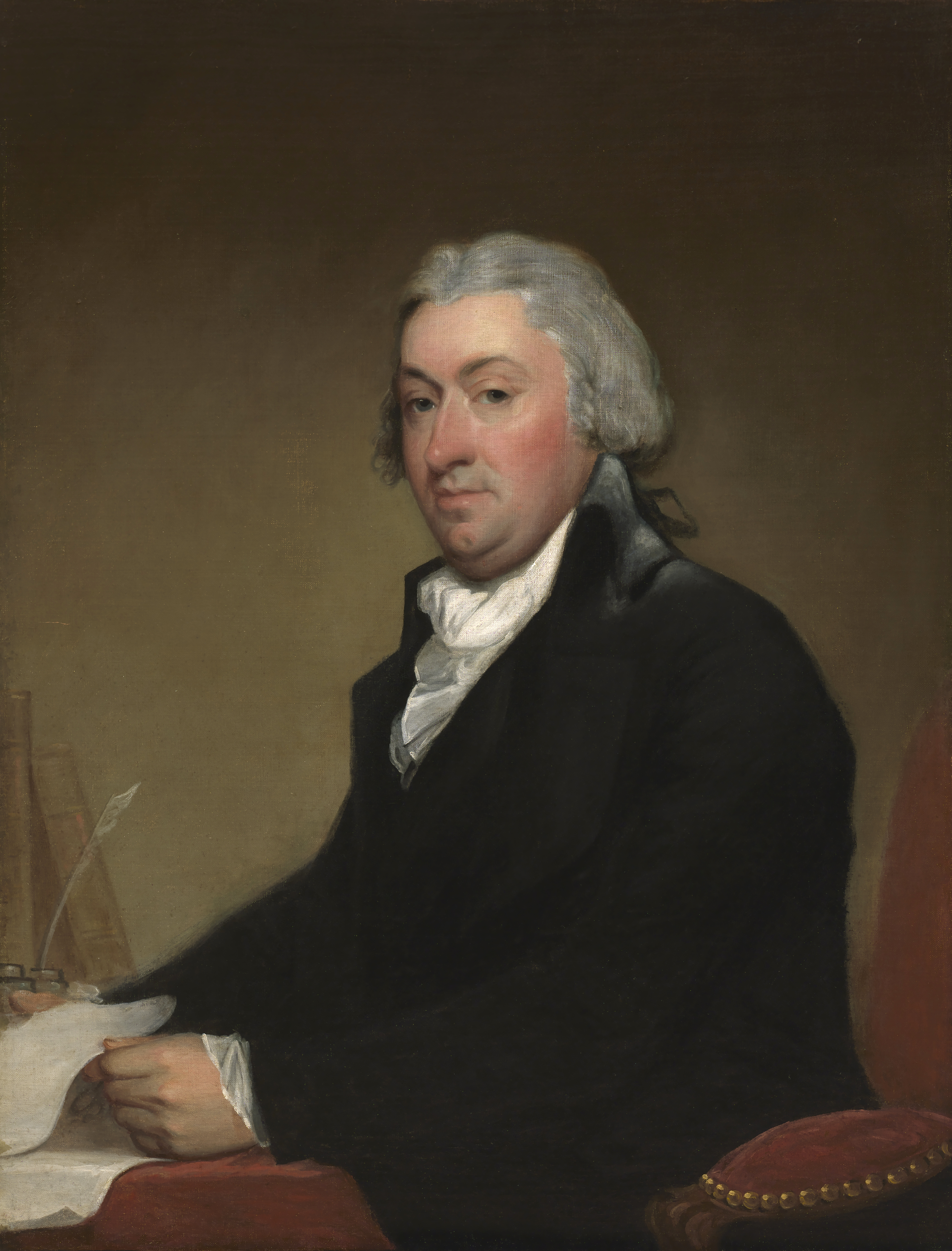
Robert R. Livingston, Founding Father of the United States, member of the Committee of Five, and the first United States Secretary of Foreign Affairs, negotiator of the Louisiana Purchase

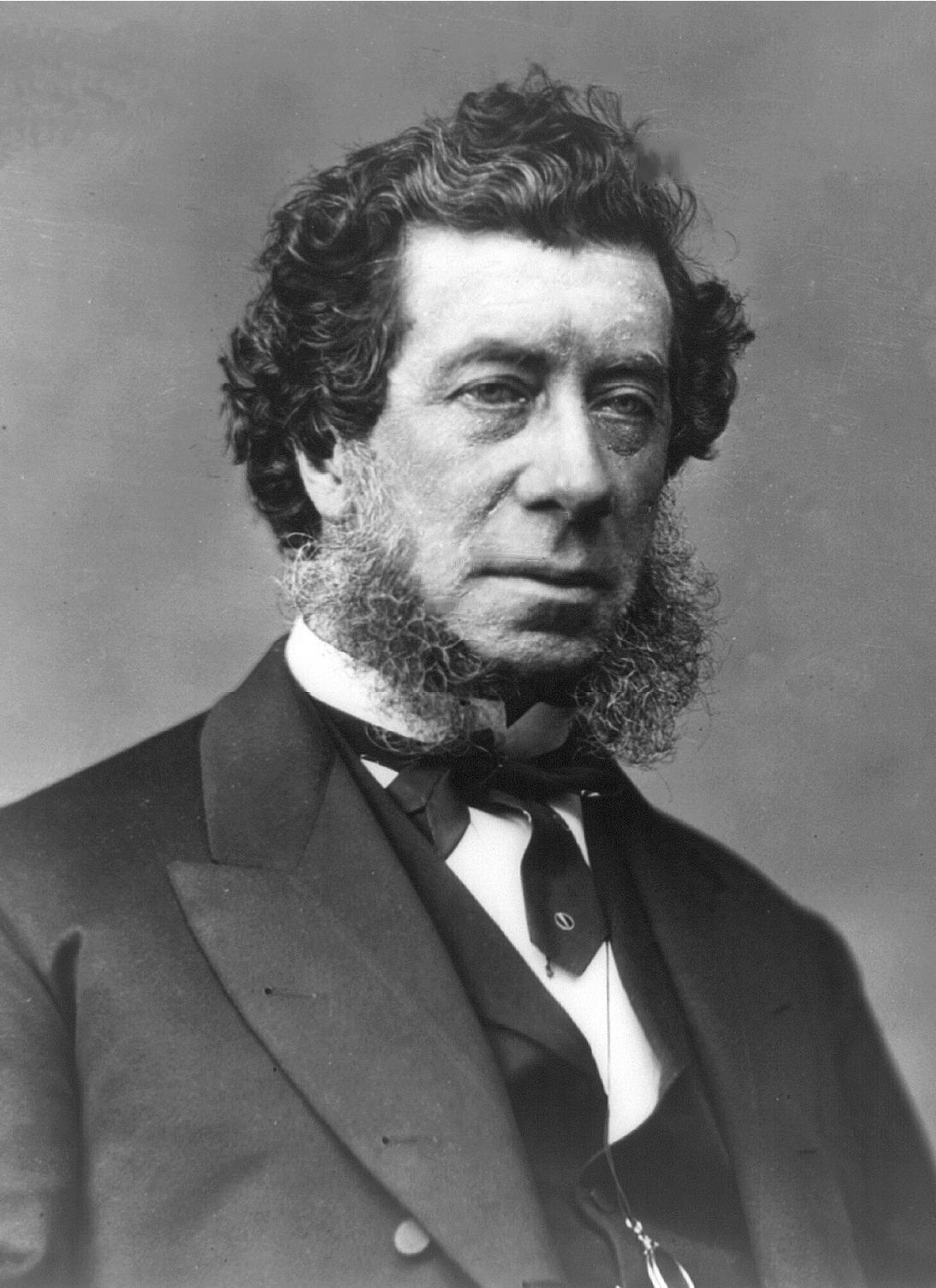
Hamilton Fish, 26th United States Secretary of State; United States Senator from New York; 16th Governor of New York

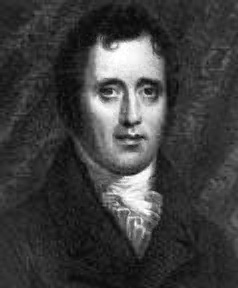
Daniel D. Tompkins, fourth governor of New York from 1807 to 1817, and the sixth vice president of the United States from 1817 to 1825

Barack Obama, 44th President of the United States; United States Senator from Illinois; Nobel laureate

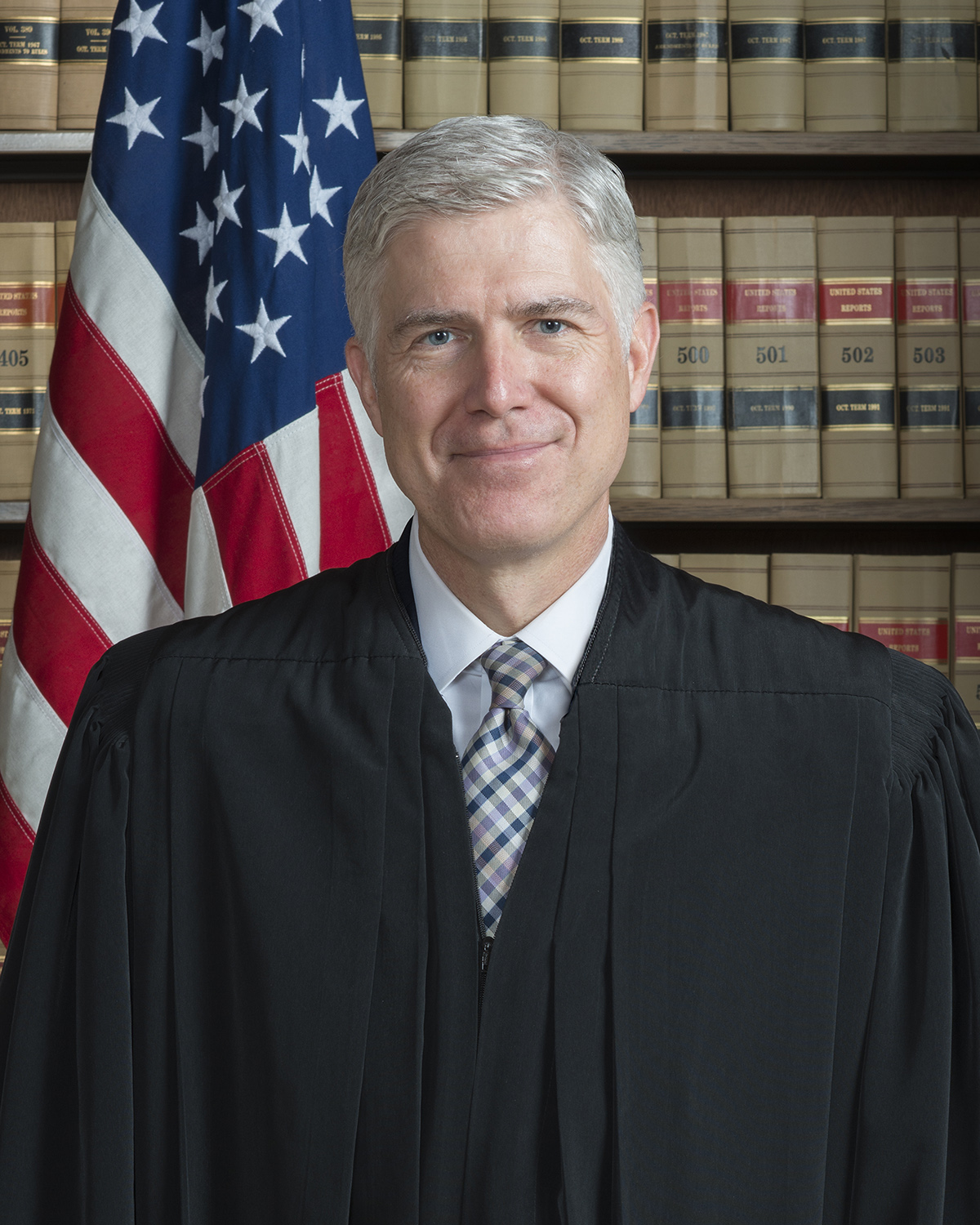
Neil Gorsuch, Associate Justice of the Supreme Court of the United States

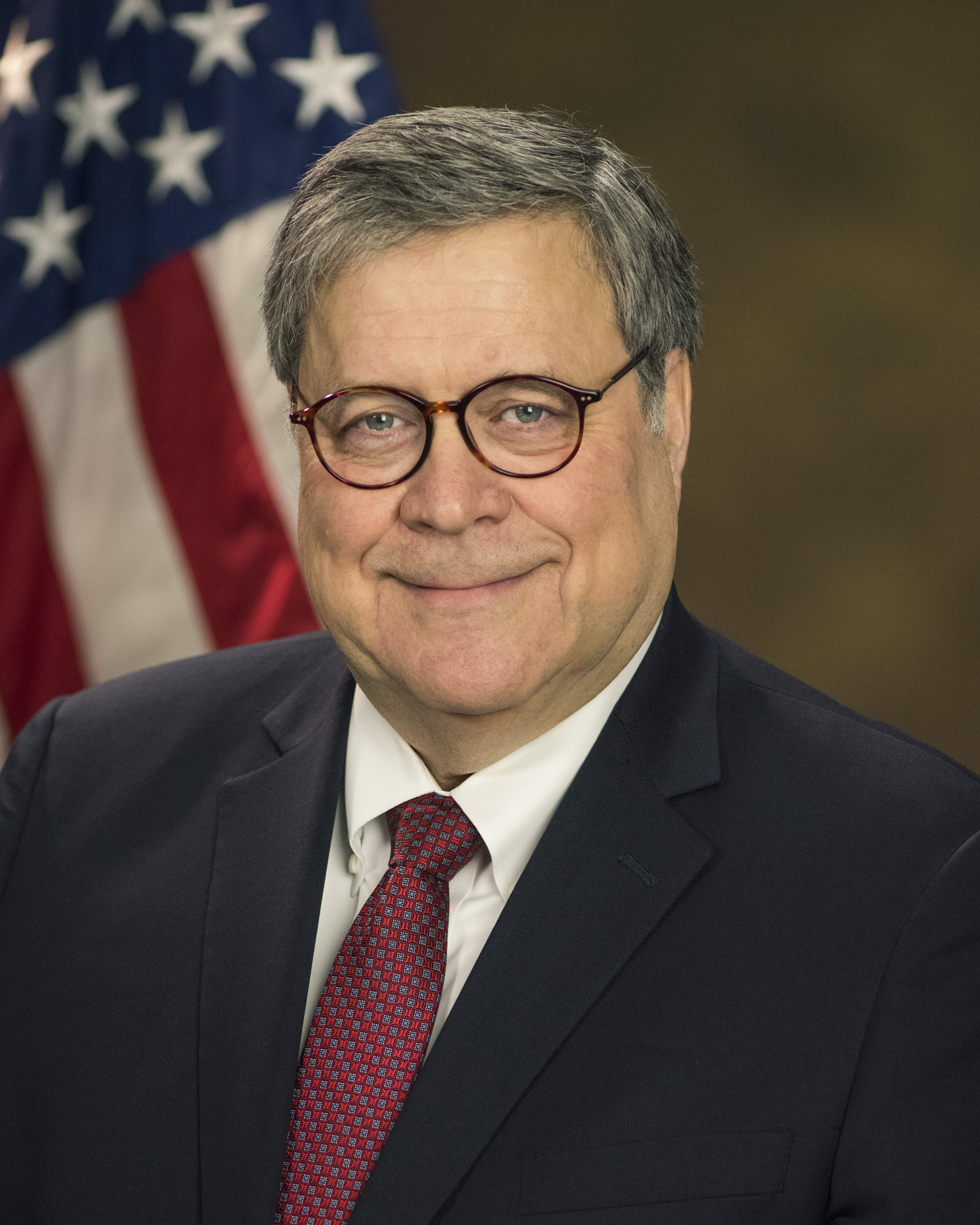
William Barr, 77th and 85th United States Attorney General

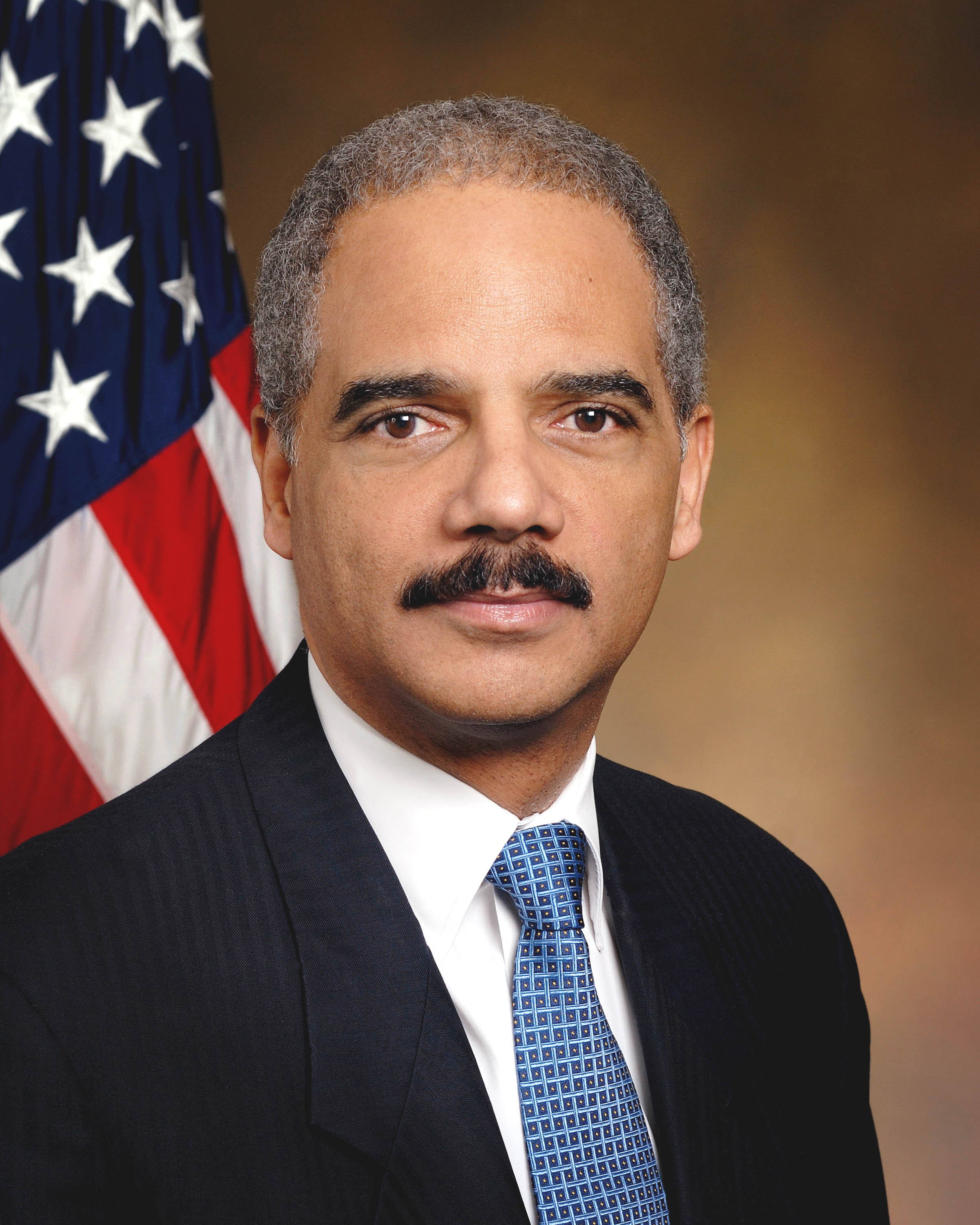
Eric Holder, 82nd United States Attorney General

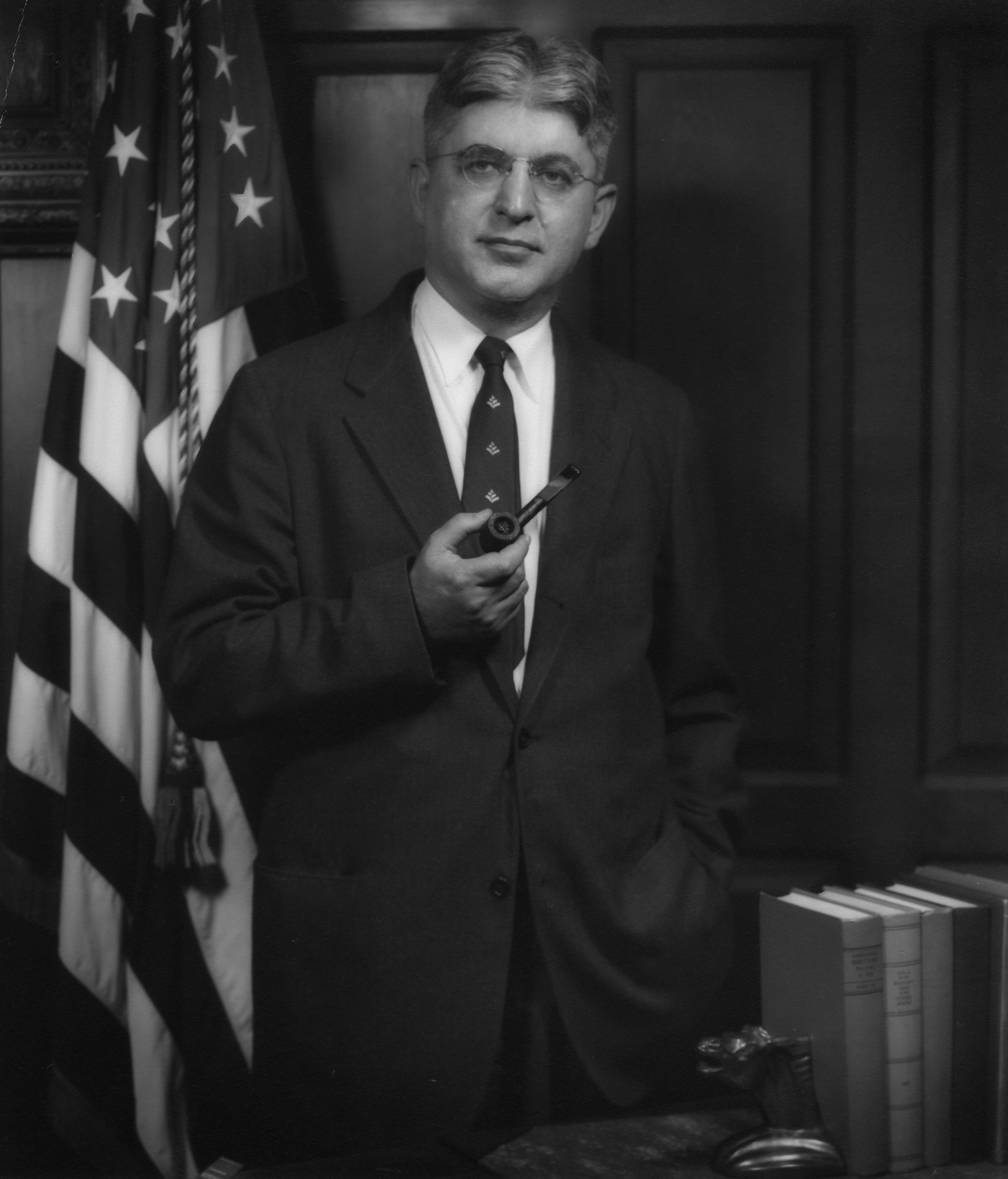
Arthur F. Burns, 10th Chairman of the Federal Reserve and former U.S. Ambassador to West Germany

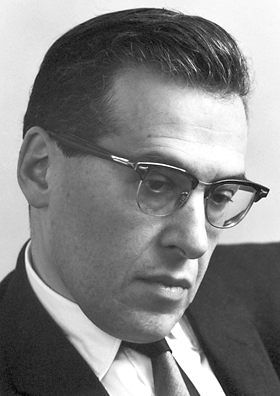
Julian S. Schwinger, Nobel laureate; pioneer of quantum field theory; one of the greatest physicists of the 20th century

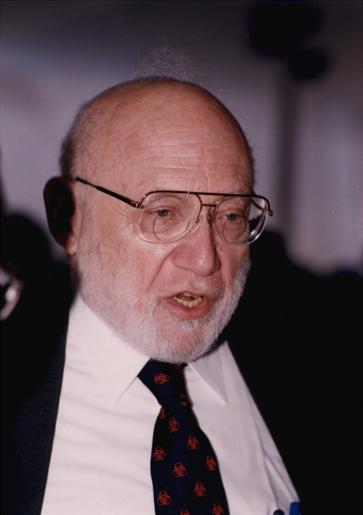
Joshua Lederberg, biologist, winner of the 1953 Nobel Prize in Physiology or Medicine

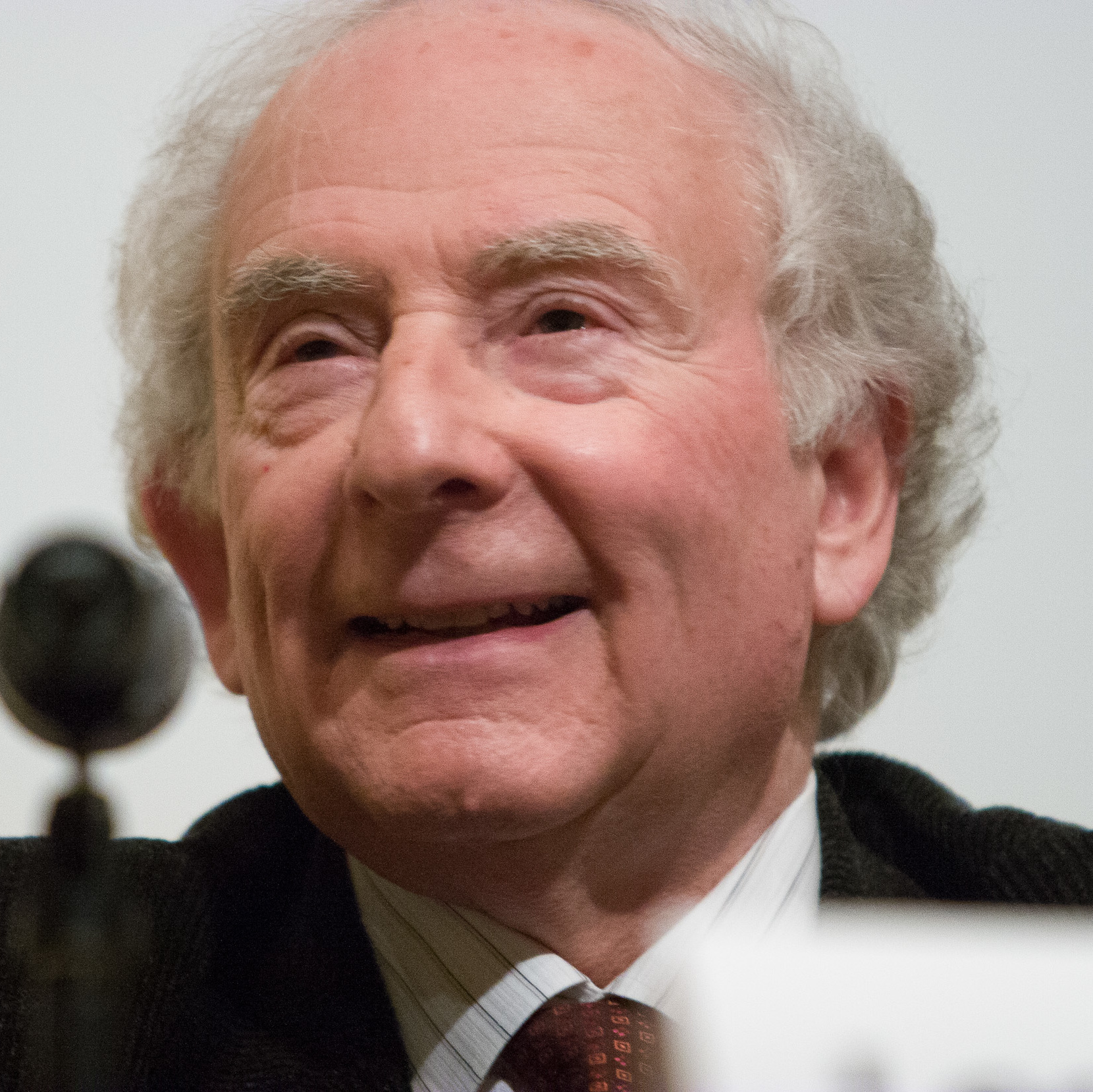
Leon Cooper, physicist, winner of the 1972 Nobel Prize in Physics

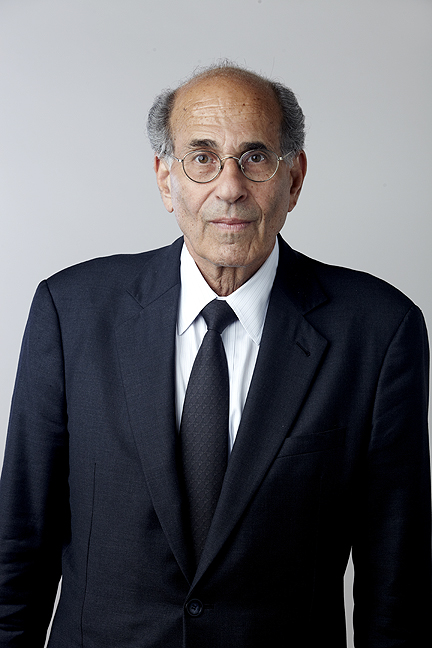
Richard Axel, biologist, winner of the 2004 Nobel Prize in Physiology or Medicine

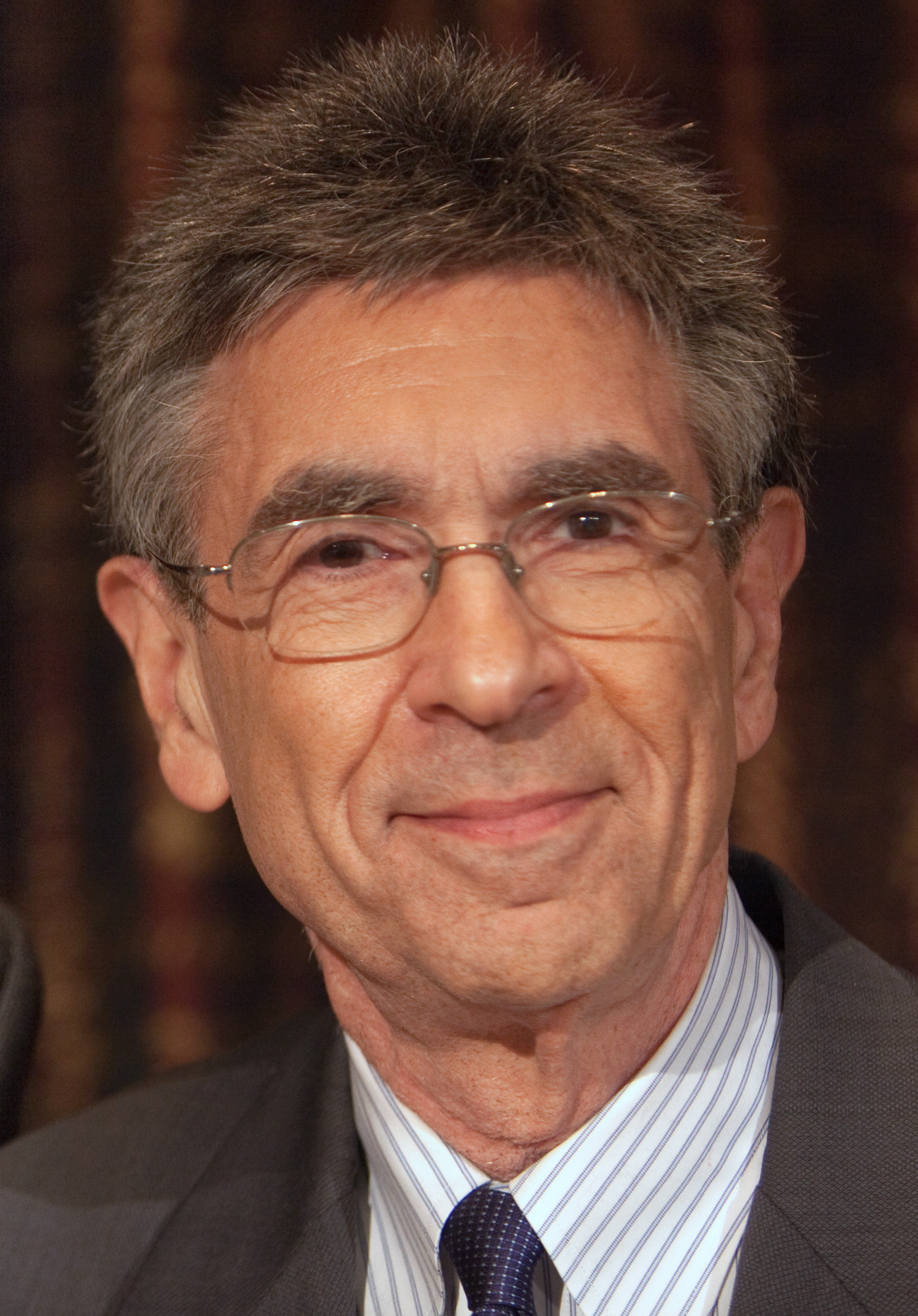
Robert Lefkowitz, biochemist, winner of the 2012 Nobel Prize in Physiology or Medicine

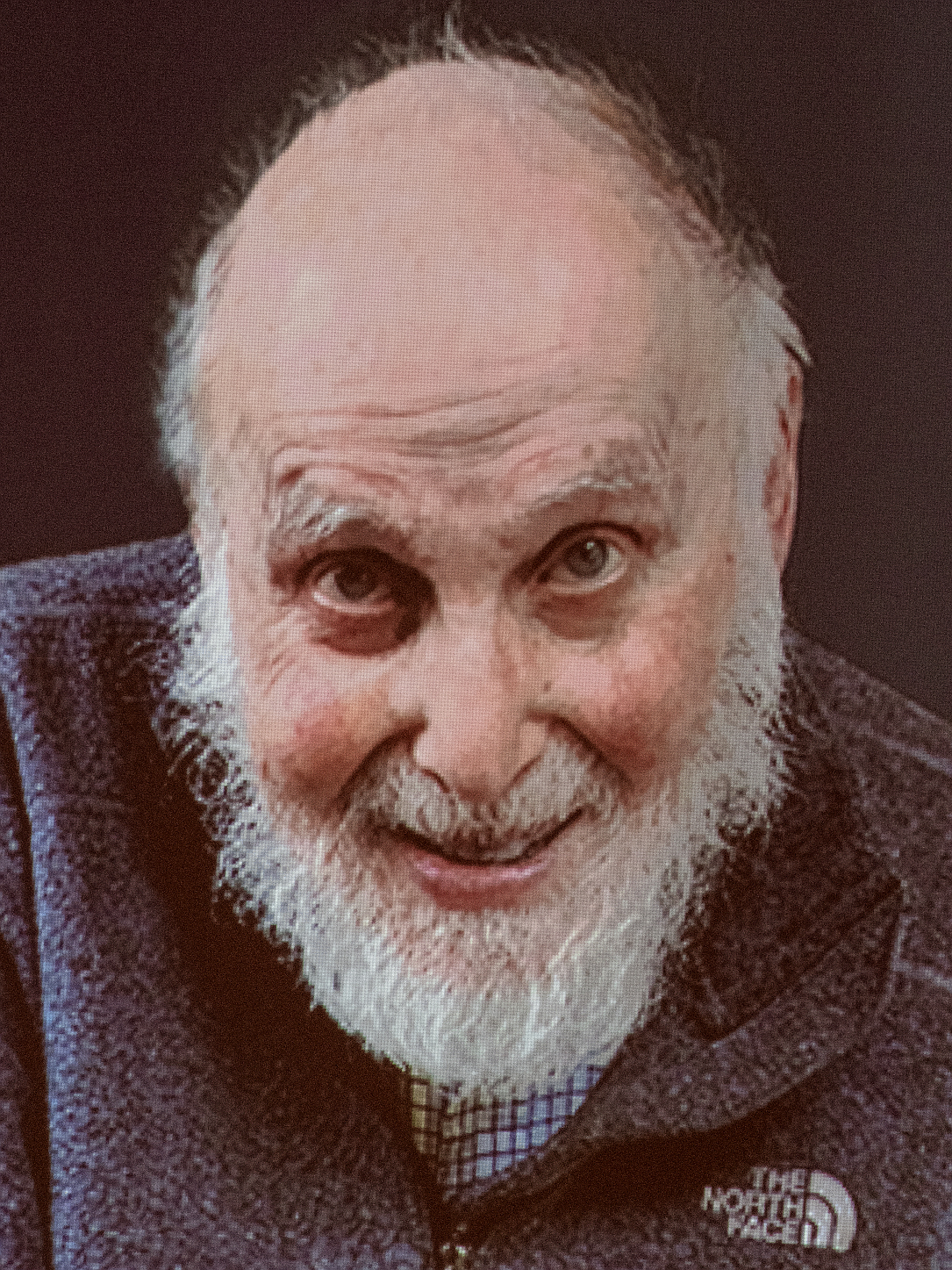
Arthur Ashkin, winner of the Nobel Prize in Physics in 2018

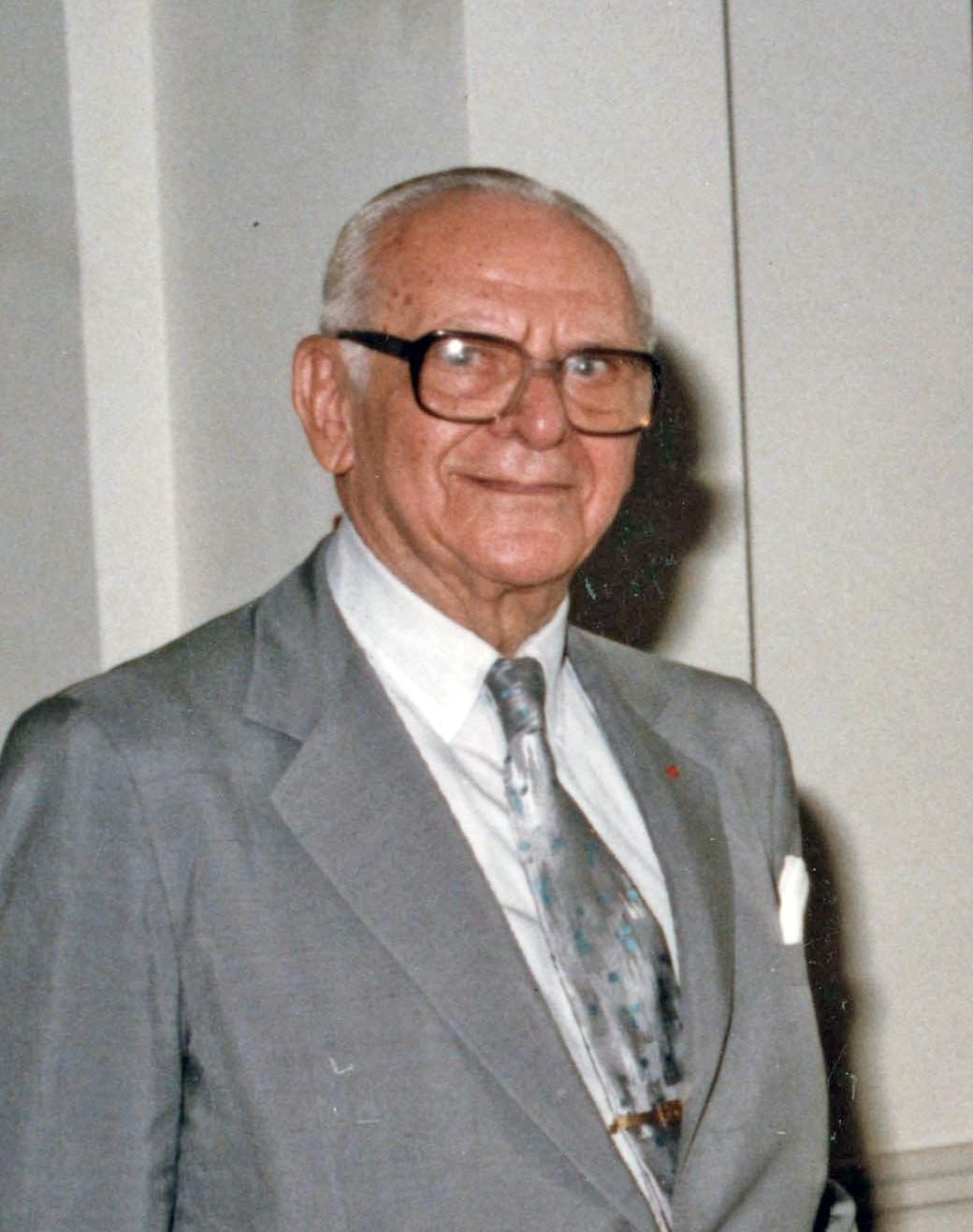
Armand Hammer, owner of Occidental Petroleum, philanthropist and citizen diplomat

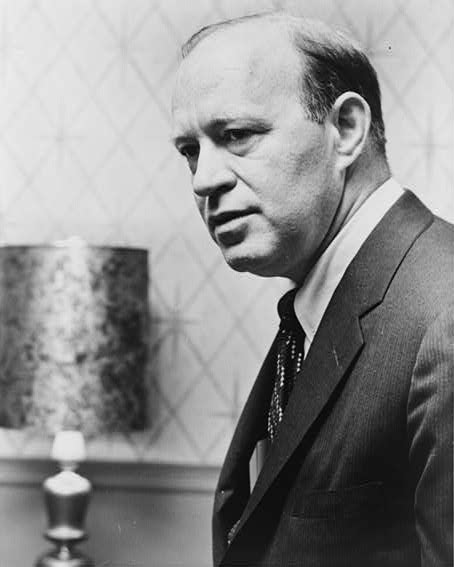
John Kluge, billionaire philanthropist, owner of Metromedia, richest man in the United States in 1990

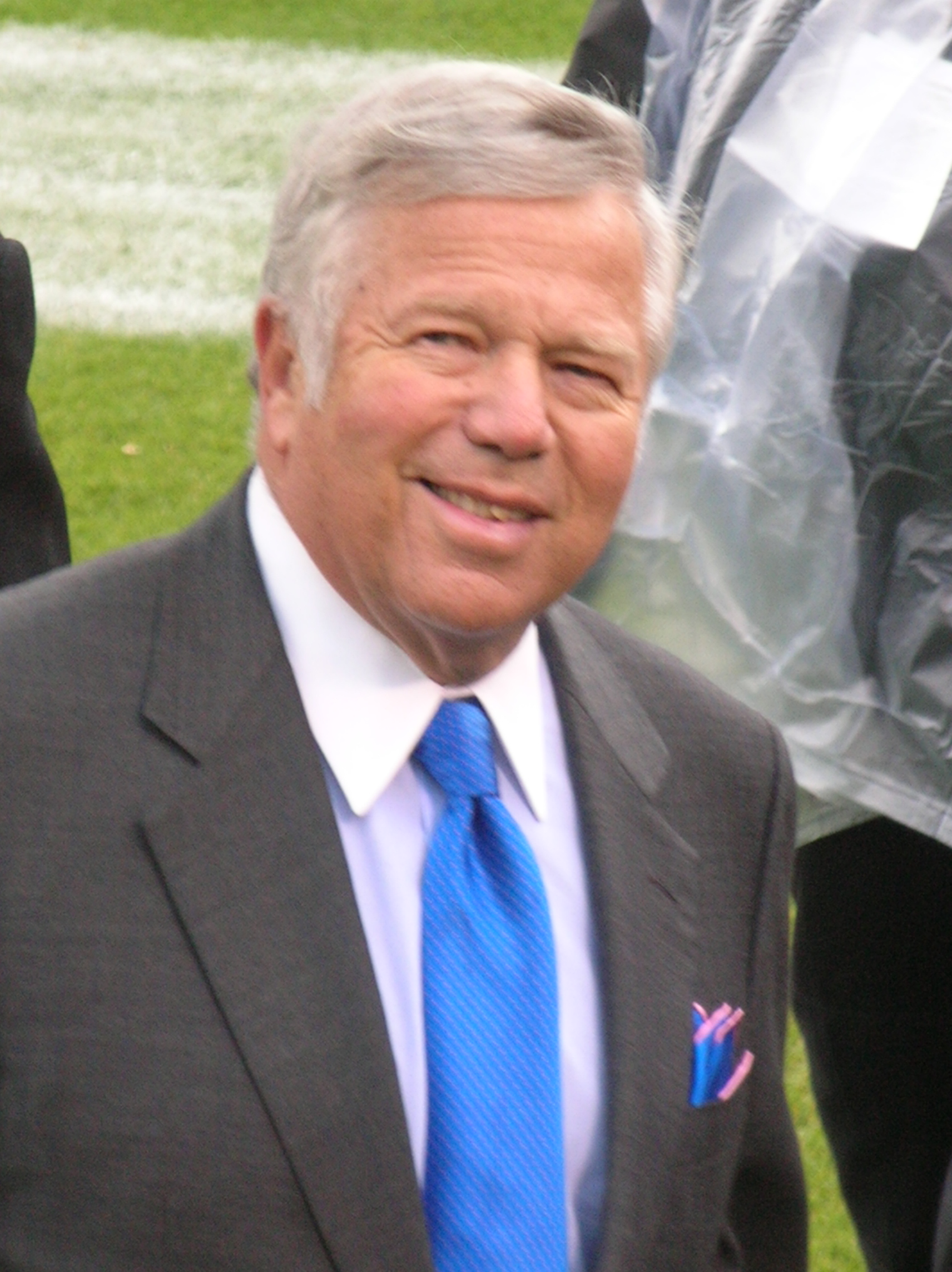
Robert Kraft, Owner, chairman, CEO of the New England Patriots; billionaire

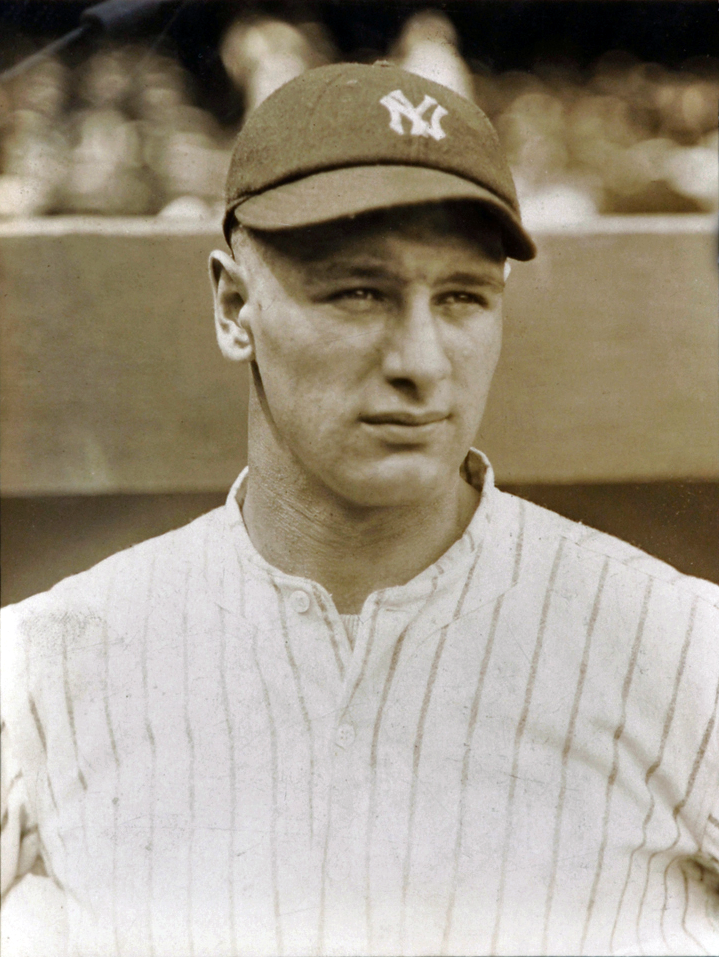
Lou Gehrig, Triple Crown winner; 2x MLB Most Valuable Player; 6x World Series Champion; member of Baseball Hall of Fame

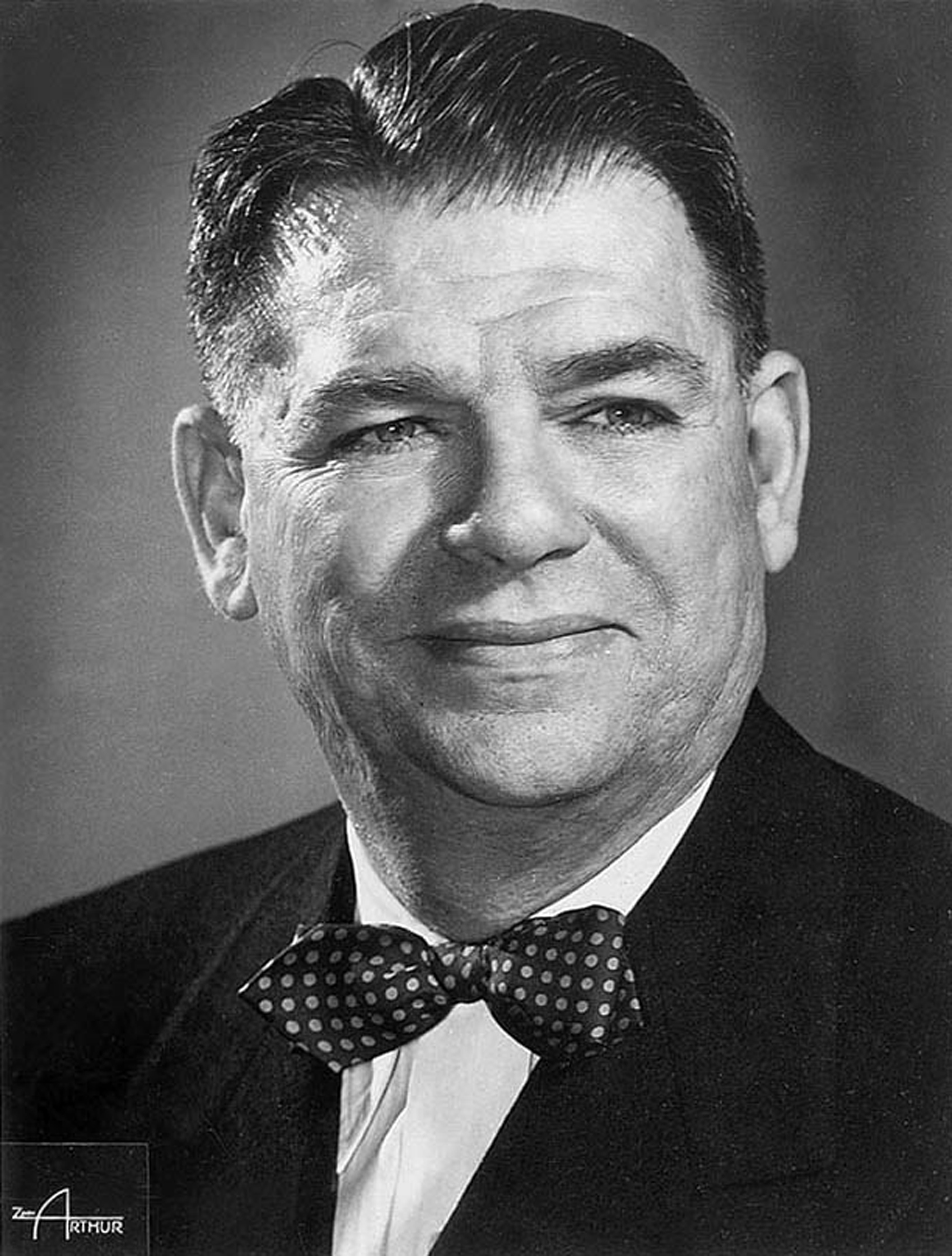
Oscar Hammerstein II, 8x Tony Award winner; 2x Academy Award winner

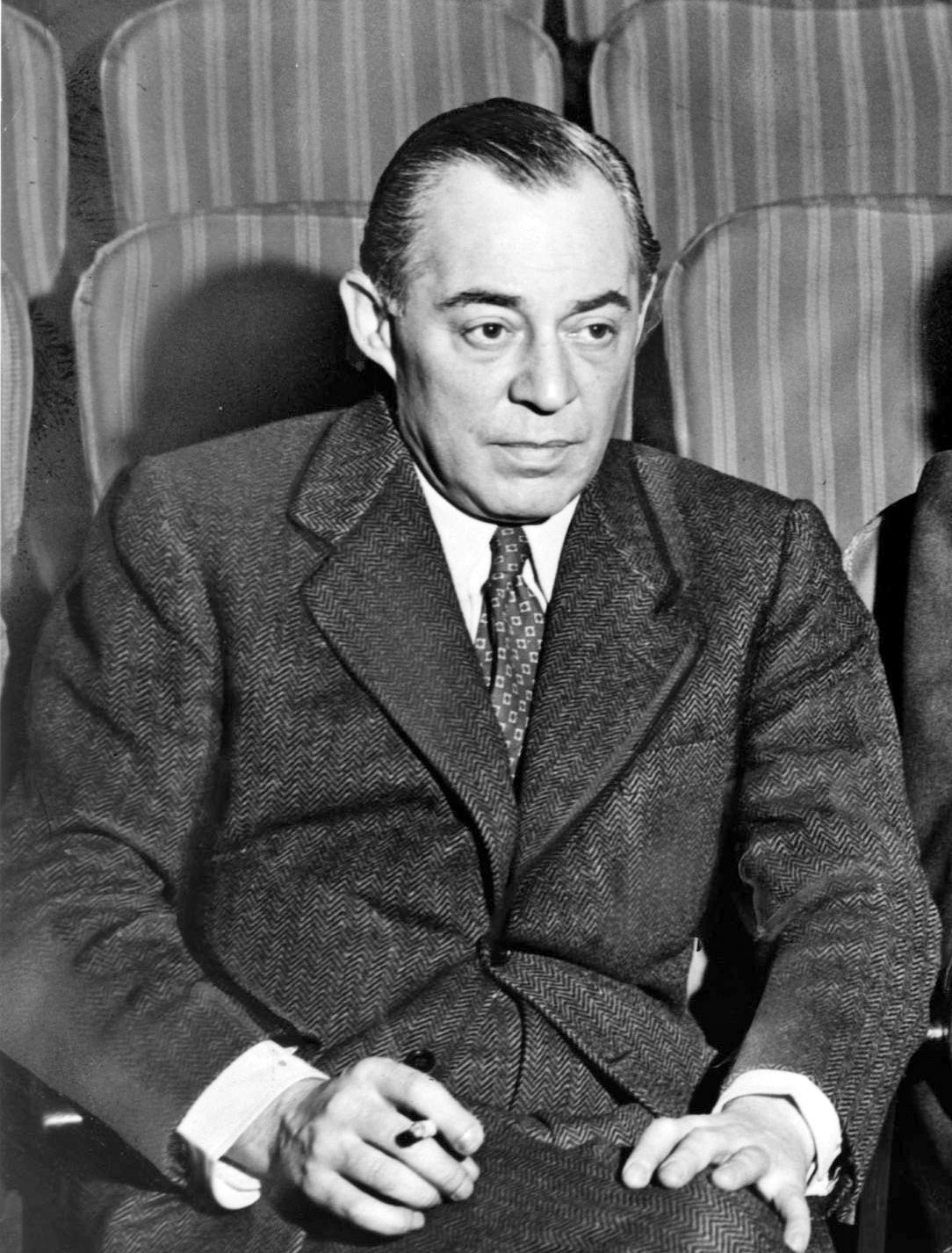
Richard Rodgers, legendary Emmy, Grammy, Oscar, and Tony award-winning composer; Pulitzer Prize winner

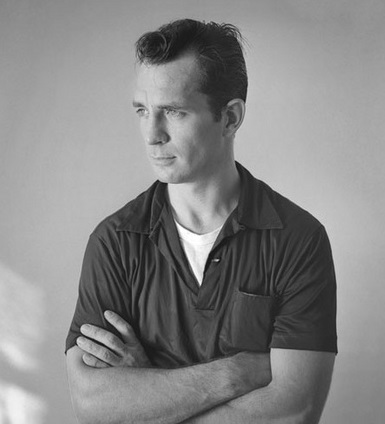
Jack Kerouac, Beat Generation author

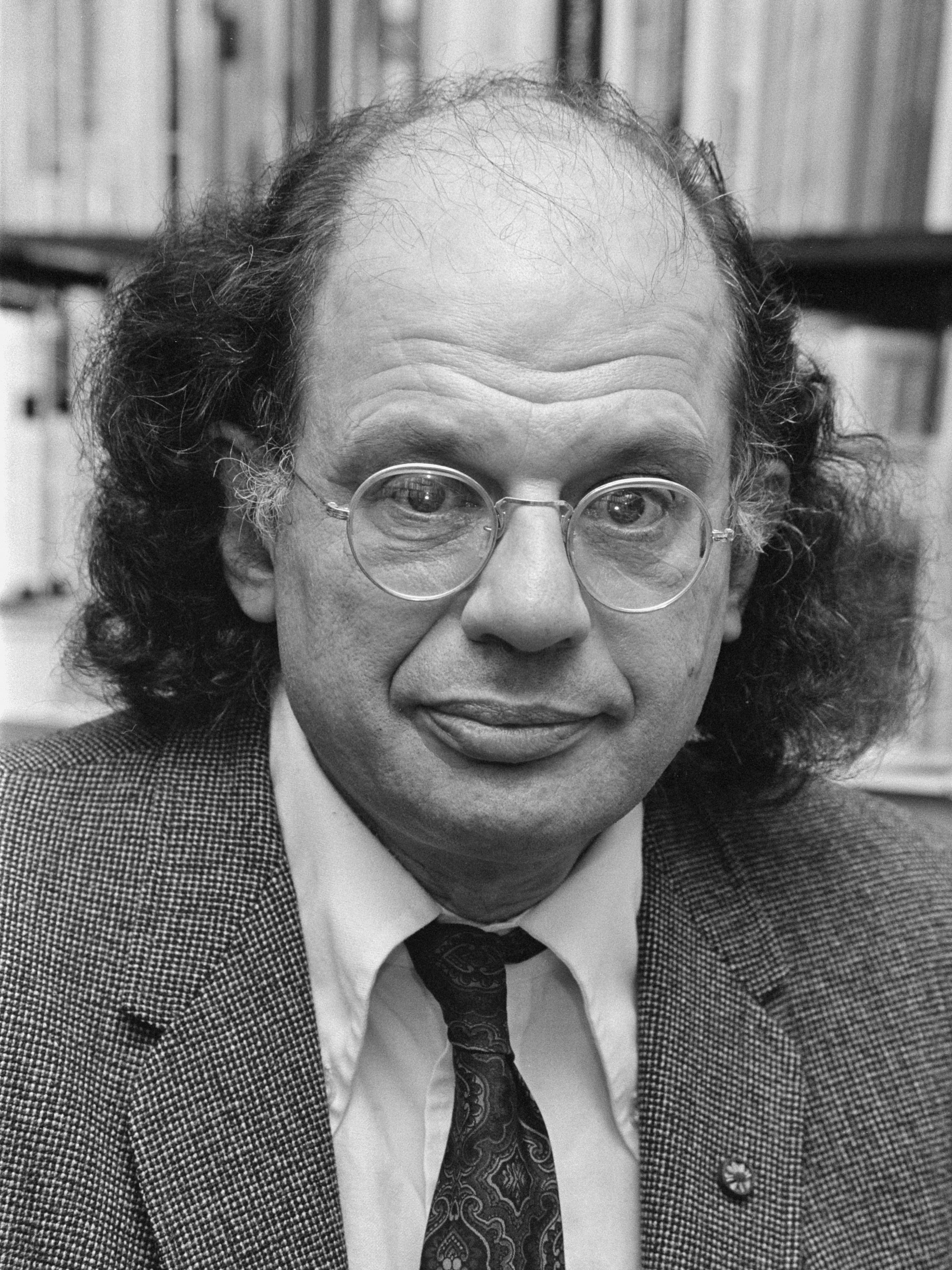
Allen Ginsberg, leading figure of the Beat Generation

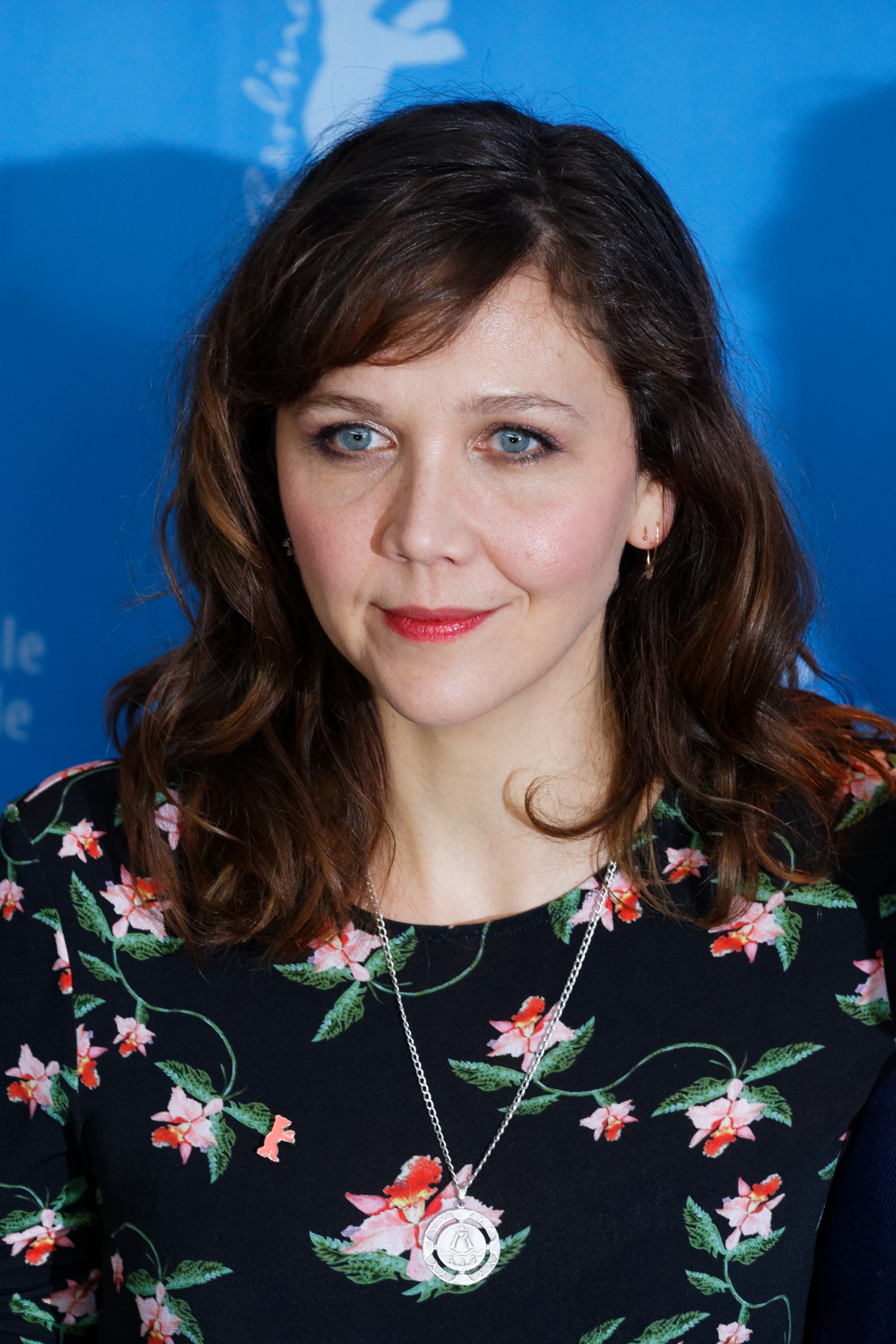
Maggie Gyllenhaal, Golden Globe Award-winning actress (Secretary, The Dark Knight, The Honourable Woman)

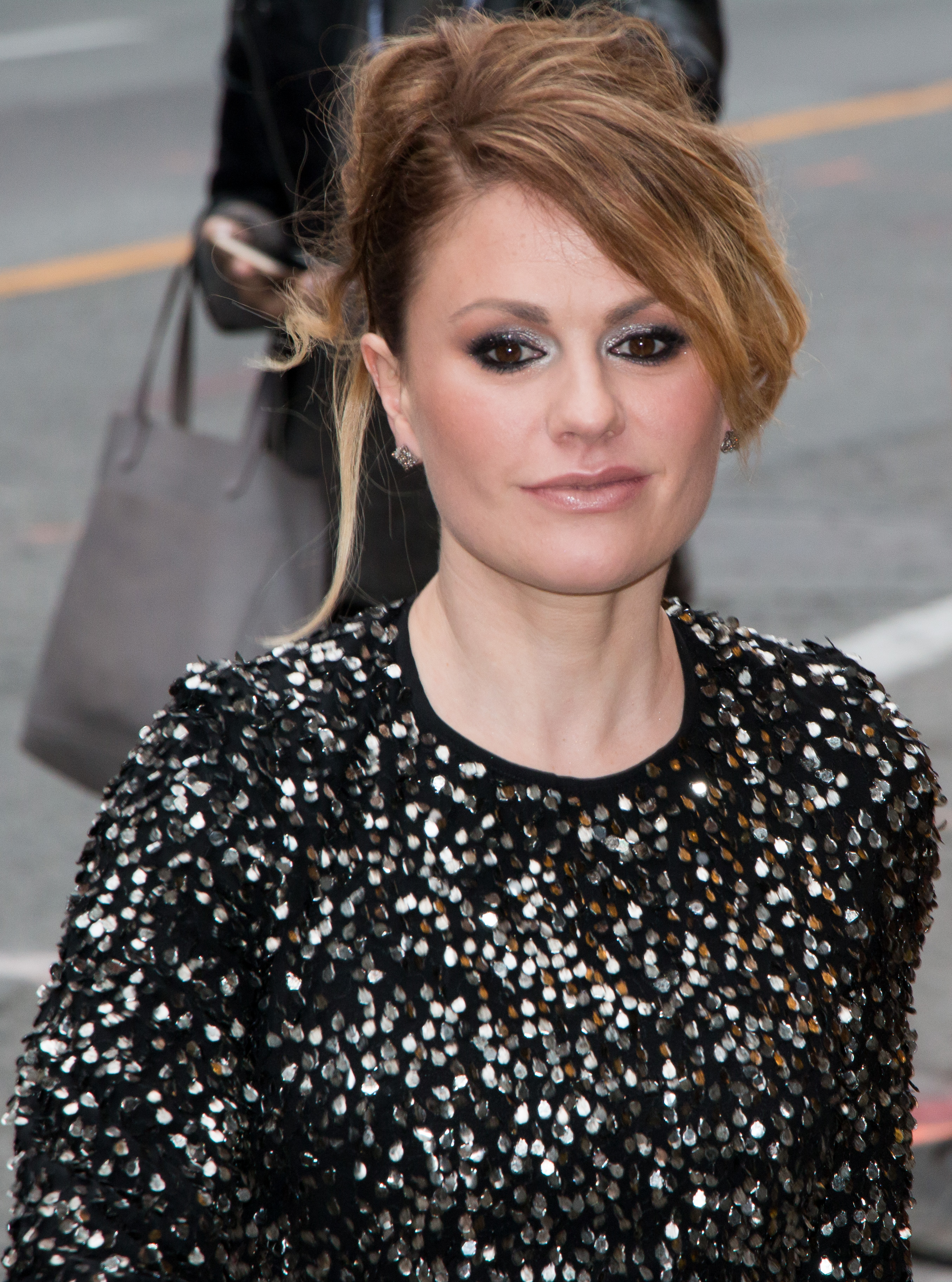
Anna Paquin, Academy Award-winning actress (The Piano, X-Men, Margaret)

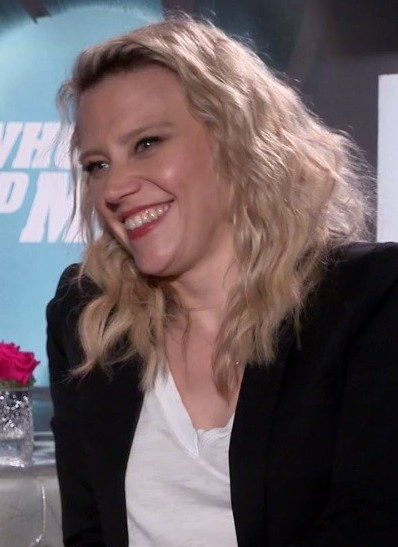
Kate McKinnon, Primetime Emmy Award-winning actress (Saturday Night Live, Ghostbusters, Barbie)

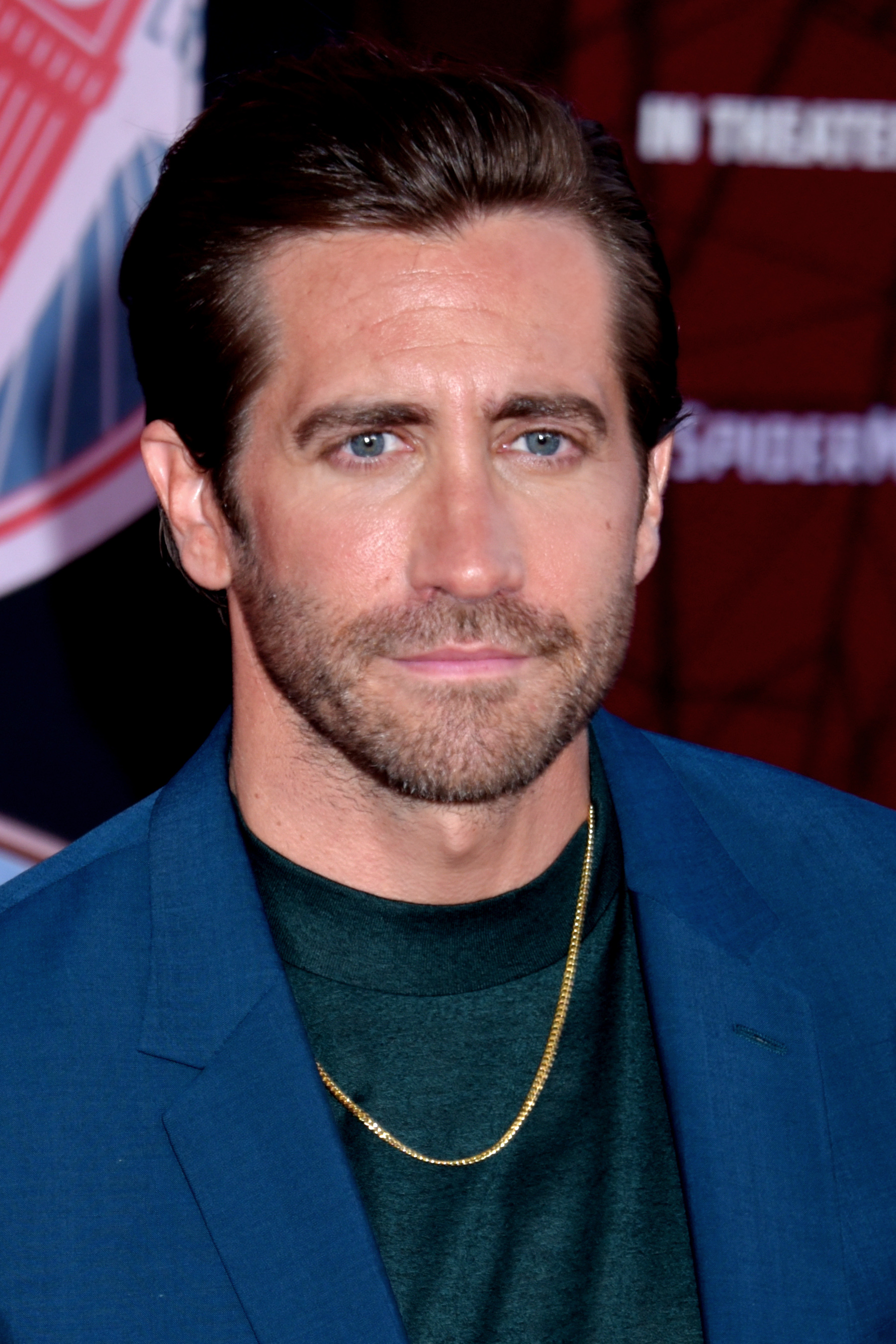
Jake Gyllenhaal, Academy Award-nominated actor (Donnie Darko, Brokeback Mountain, Nightcrawler)

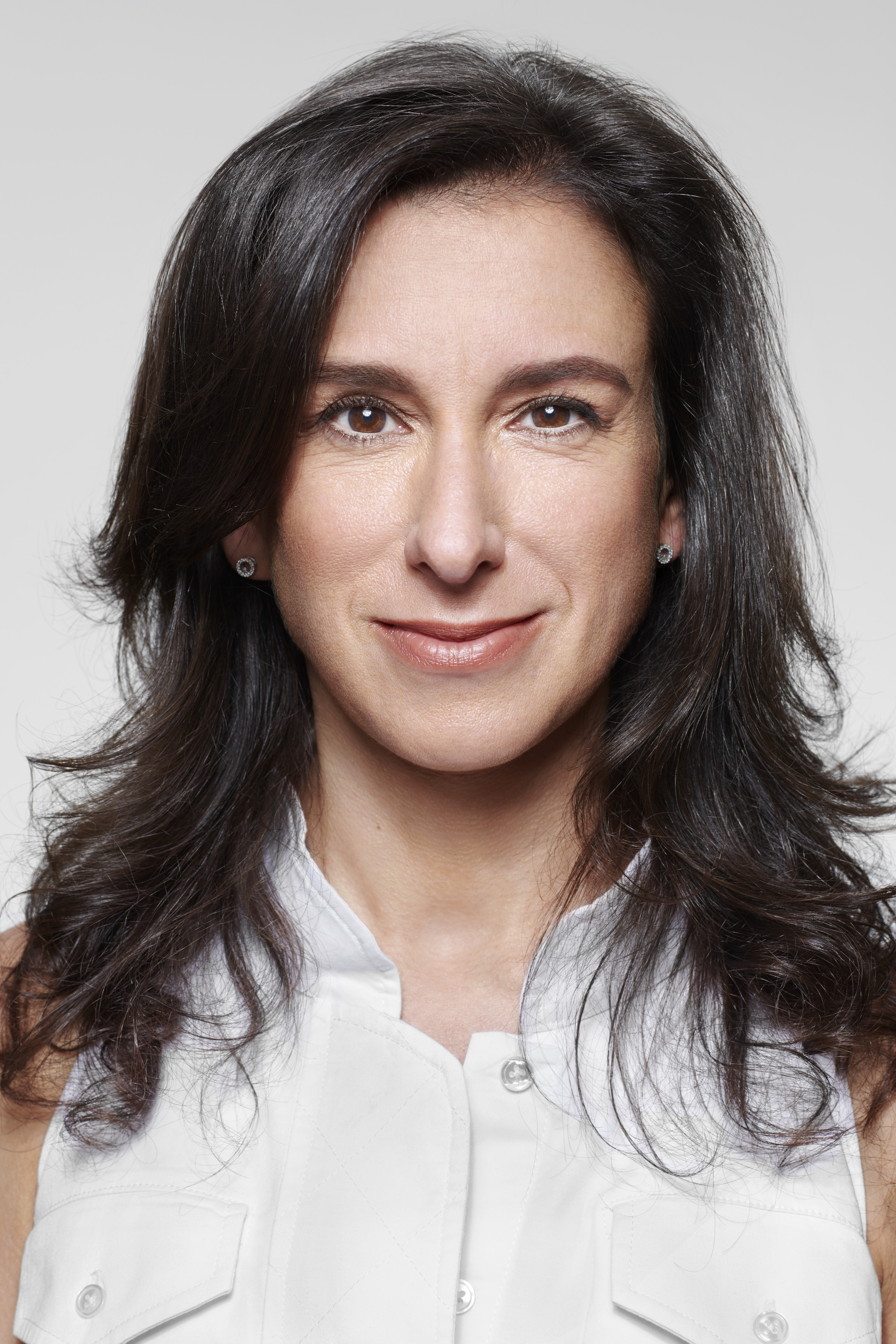
Jodi Kantor, Pulitzer Prize-winning journalist known for exposing the Harvey Weinstein sexual abuse scandal

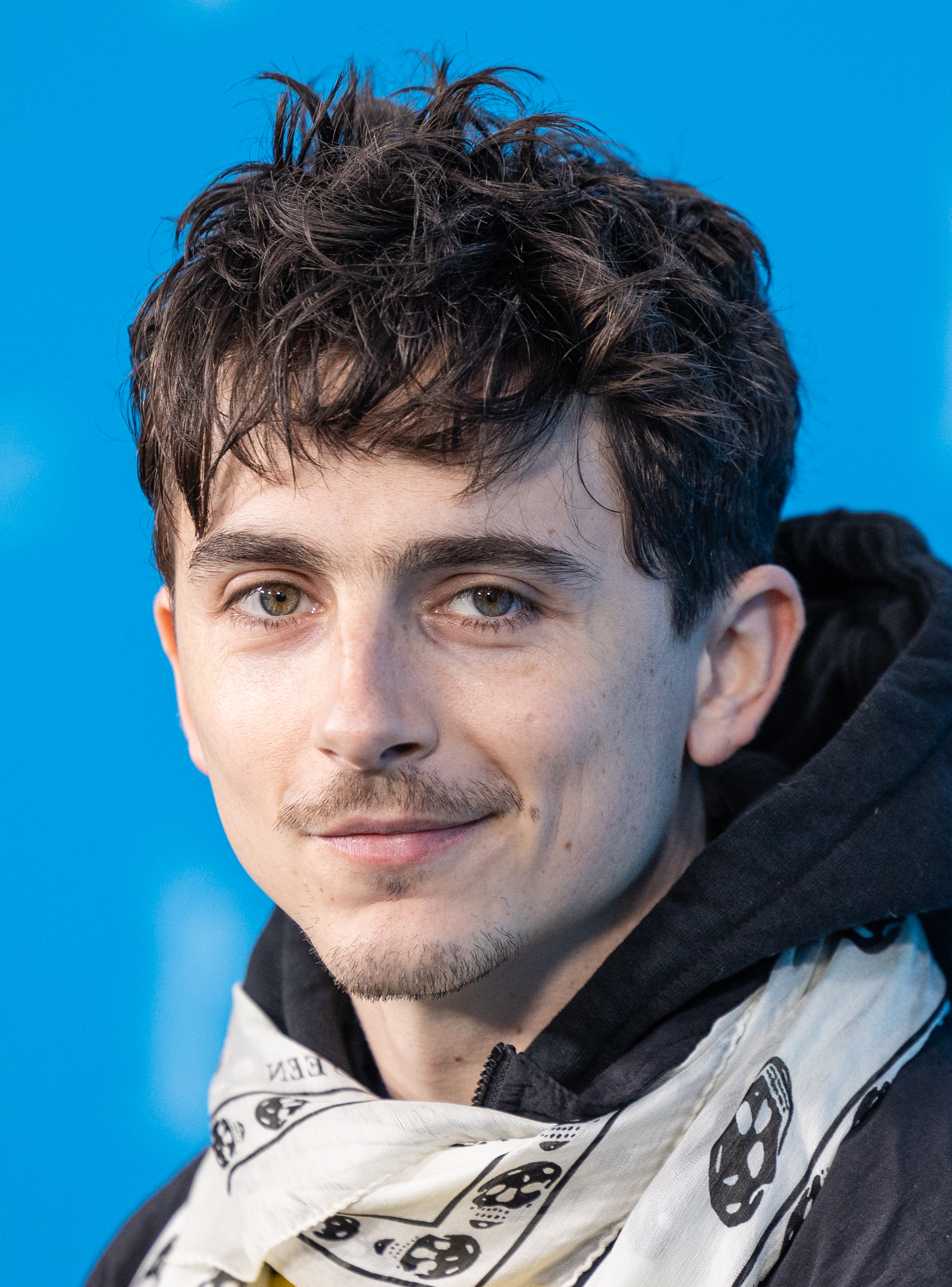
Timothée Chalamet, Academy Award-nominated actor (Call Me by Your Name, Dune, A Complete Unknown, Marty Supreme)

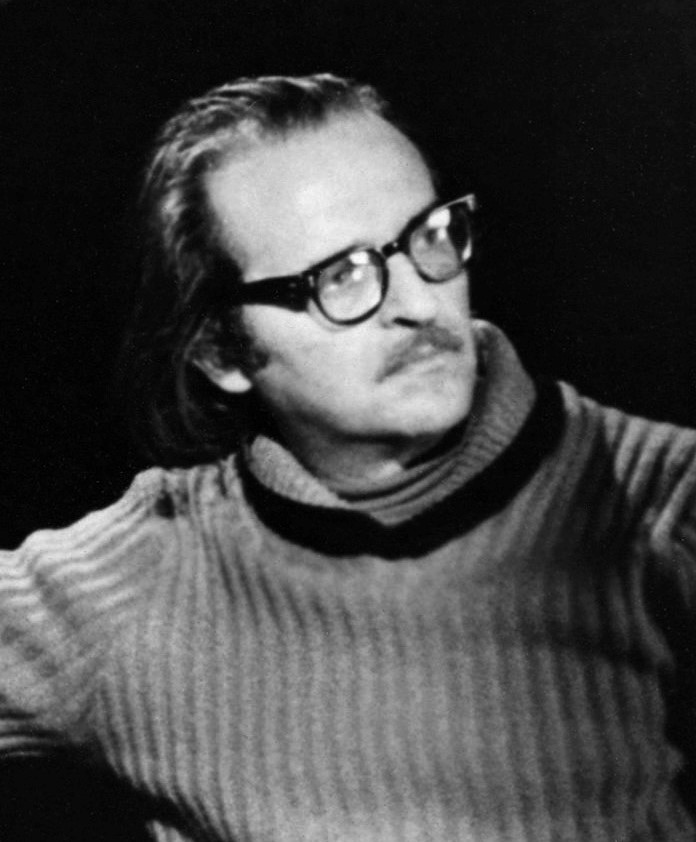
Sidney Lumet, Academy Award-winning director (12 Angry Men, Dog Day Afternoon, Network)
