= Josef Sorett =

American scholar

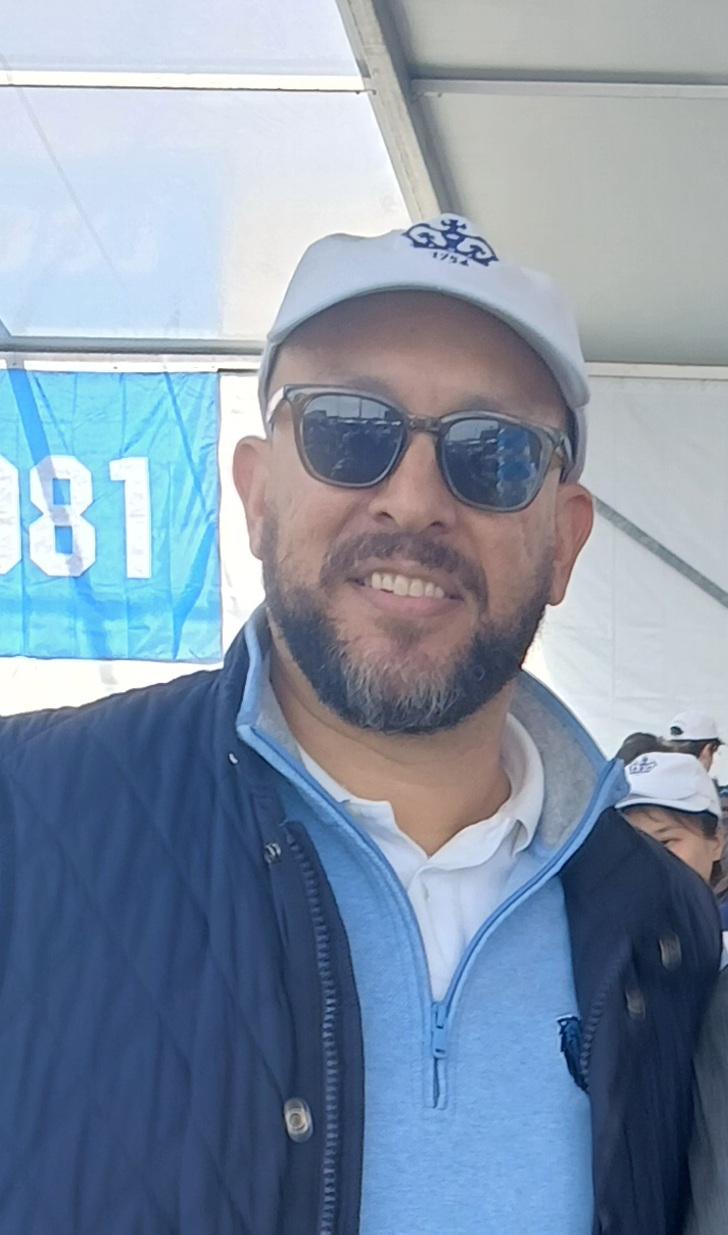
- Education: Oral Roberts (BA); Boston University (MDiv); Harvard University (PhD)
- Occupations: professor and academic administrator
- Employer: Columbia University
- Known for: Dean of Columbia College of Columbia University

Josef Sorett is an American scholar of religion and race in the Americas. He has served as the dean of Columbia College of Columbia University since July 2022.

== Education ==
Josef Sorett received a Bachelor of Science in Health and Exercise Science from Oral Roberts University in 1996. While at Oral Roberts, he played on the men's basketball team his junior and senior year, under coach Bill Self.

Sorett has a MDiv in Religion and Literature from Boston University in 2000, and received his PhD in African American Studies from Harvard University in 2008.

His doctoral dissertation is titled Spirit Soundings: Religion, Race and the Arts in Twentieth Century America.

== Career ==
=== Columbia University ===
Sorett began teaching at Columbia University in 2009, and later became professor of religion and African American and African diaspora studies, chair of the department of religion, and director of the Center on African-American Religion, Sexual Politics and Social Justice. His research focuses on how religion has shaped cultures of Black communities and movements in the United States, from a perspective that straddles history, literature, religion, art and music.

In April 2016, he participated in a conference on the TV show The Wire.

=== Dean of Columbia College ===
Since July 2022, Sorett has been the dean of Columbia College and vice president of undergraduate education. Also in that year, Sorett began serving as Chair of Columbia University's Inclusive Public Safety Advisory Committee to "foster an inclusive campus community" with dialogue about campus racism and was awarded Columbia's Presidential Award for Outstanding Teaching.

During Columbia's annual alumni reunion on May 31, 2024, Sorett texted with three other Columbia deans about an antisemitism panel on campus, responding "yup" to comments that the other deans had made and at one point texting "LMAO". On July 2, a petition signed by more than 2,000 students, alumni, and parents was sent that called on the college to also remove Sorett for his role in the incident. Sorett later apologized without making excuses and was internally punished by Columbia, while the three other deans were suspended from their positions and eventually resigned from Columbia on August 8.

== Books ==
- Spirit in the Dark: A Religious History of Racial Aesthetics (Oxford University Press, 2016)
- The Sexual Politics of Black Churches (Columbia University Press, 2022) editor
- Black is a Church: Christianity and the Contours of African American Life (Oxford University Press, 2023)
