= Herbert Hawkes =

American mathematician and educator

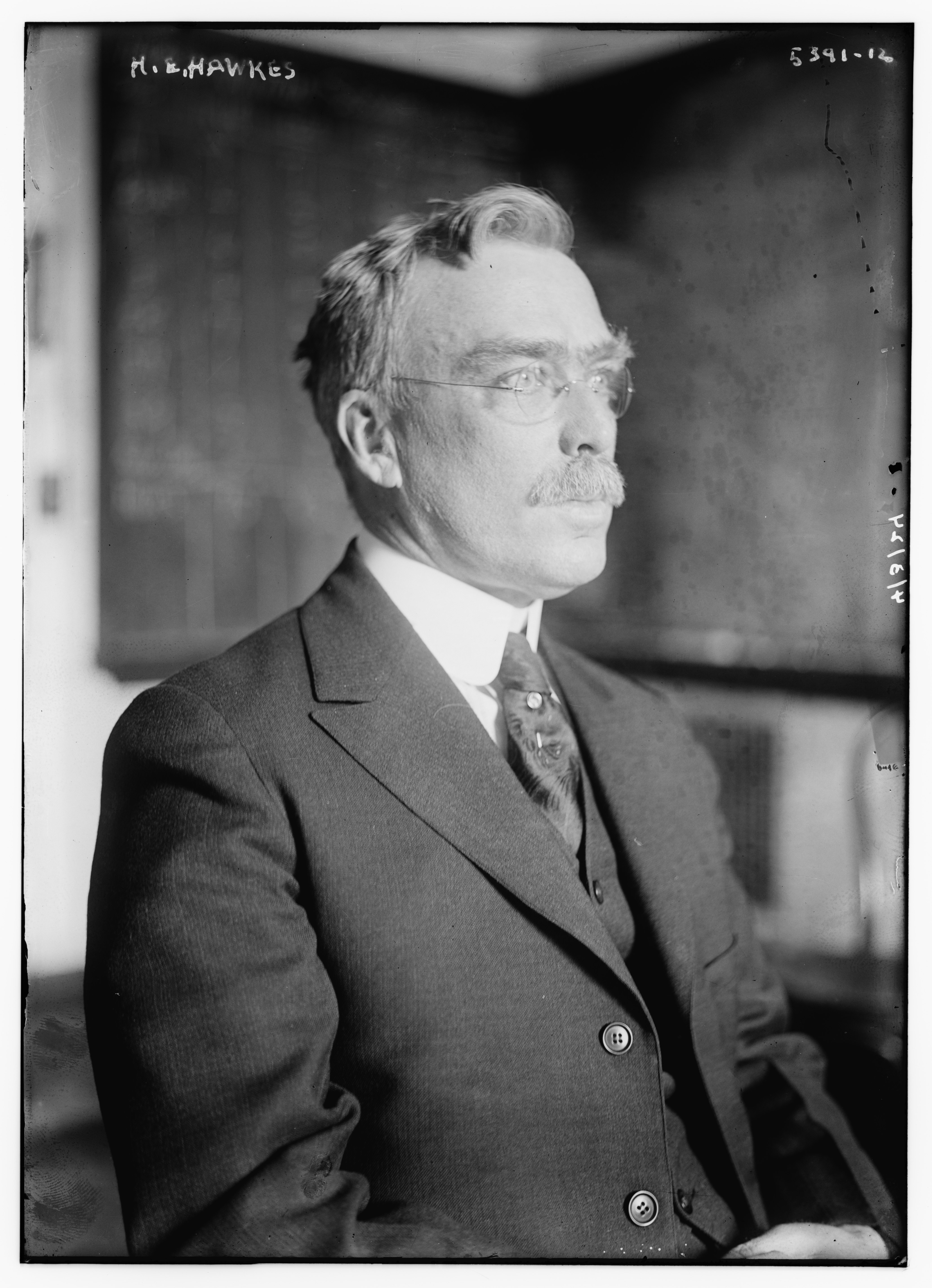

Dean of Columbia College
- In office 1918–1943
- Preceded by: Frederick P. Keppel
- Succeeded by: Harry Carman

Personal details
- Born: 1872
- Died: 1943 (aged 70–71)
- Education: University of Göttingen (BA); Yale University (PhD)

Herbert Edwin Hawkes (1872 – 1943) was an American mathematician and educator. His 25-year tenure as Dean of Columbia College, the longest of any Columbia College dean, earned him the title "the dean of American college deans".

Hawkes studied mathematics at the Georg August University of Göttingen in Germany as well as at Yale, where he received his doctorate in 1900 under James Pierpont. After authoring several texts in algebra, Hawkes accepted a position as professor of mathematics at Columbia University in 1910. When Columbia College dean Frederick P. Keppel departed to work for the U.S. War Department in 1917, Hawkes became acting dean, ascending to the full deanship a year later.

As dean, Hawkes was known as a supporter of general education. He promoted a full undergraduate education and opposed the "Columbia plan" to fast-track students to graduate school in under four years. In 1919, he and a small group of other faculty members helped assemble a sequence of war-issues classes known as "Contemporary Civilization;" this would become a more general year-long philosophy course and the cornerstone of the college's famous Core Curriculum. In the 1930s he pushed through a similar year-long humanities sequence, to become the Core Curriculum's "Literature Humanities" course, over some faculty objections. His advocacy of general education classes in the natural sciences, however, did not meet with the same success.

Hawkes served as dean of the college until his death in 1943.

Academic offices
Preceded by Frederick P. Keppel	Dean of Columbia College; 1918 – 1943	Succeeded by Harry Carman
