= Core Curriculum (Columbia College) =

Academic program at Columbia University

One section of the Contemporary Civilization Source Book in the early 1940s. There were two parts containing ten sections each. This copy shows it in use at Yale University in addition to Columbia.

The Core Curriculum was originally developed as the main curriculum used by Columbia College of Columbia University in 1919. Created in the wake of World War I, it became the framework for many similar educational models throughout the United States, and has played an influential role in the incorporation of the concept of Western civilization into the American college curriculum. Today, customized versions of the Core Curriculum are also completed by students in the Fu Foundation School of Engineering and Applied Science and the School of General Studies, the other two undergraduate colleges of Columbia University.

Later in its history, especially in the 1990s, it became a heavily contested form of learning, seen by some as an appropriate foundation of a liberal arts education, and by others as a tool of promoting a Eurocentric or Anglocentric society by solely focusing on the works of "dead white men". Largely driven by student protests, the Core in recent decades has been revised to add focus on non-Western cultures, as well as postcolonial works to the literature and philosophy sequences. The most recent major addition to the Core was made in the 2000s with the addition of "Frontiers of Science", a scientific literacy course, to the curriculum.

== History ==
=== Early curricula ===
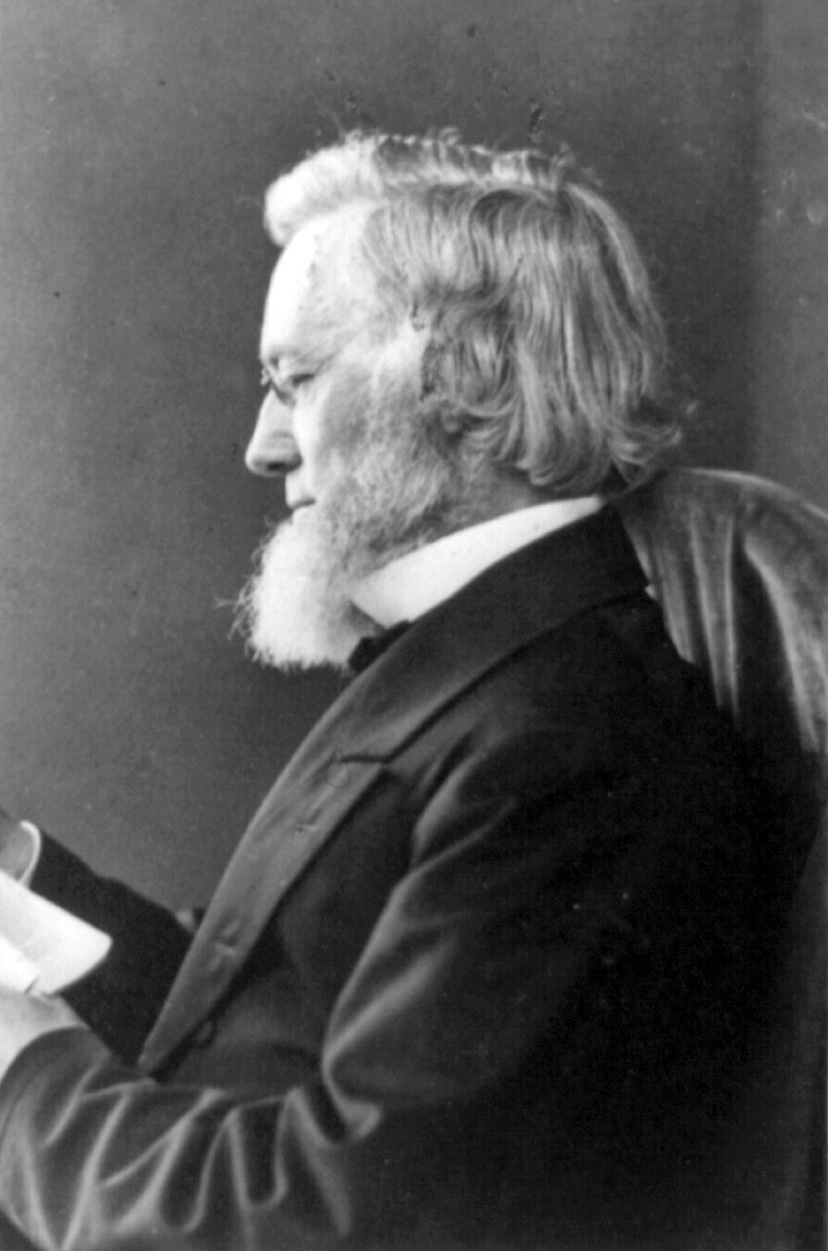
President Frederick A. P. Barnard was one of the earliest proponents of the elective system in the 19th century.

Early instruction at Columbia College, from its founding in 1754 as King's College, almost entirely revolved around the study of the classics, and entering students were expected to already be fluent in Ancient Greek and Latin. Through most of the 19th century, all students were prescribed a single course of studies, save for a period of time beginning in 1830, when the college introduced the "Literary and Scientific course" in addition to the standard curriculum, which was dubbed the "Full course". The former was open to the public with no expectations of attendance, and was discontinued in 1843. In the "Full course", as set out in the 1843 revision of the college's statutes, in addition to four years of the classics and German, freshmen were to study algebra, geometry, and English grammar and composition; sophomores, trigonometry and solid geometry, levelling, navigation, chemistry, physics, and rhetoric; juniors, "practical astronomy", chemistry, geology, the "principles of taste and criticism", logic, and English and modern European literature; seniors, differential and integral calculus, mechanics, philosophy and religion, and English composition. The adoption of mandatory German was made that year, following a $20,000 bequest from Frederick Gebhard which established the university's German department, though it was soon made optional in 1847.

By the late-19th century, many American universities, including Harvard, had seen a trend towards more elective programs. President Frederick A. P. Barnard was an early supporter of this movement—in 1872, Yale president Noah Porter criticized him as one of "the educational reformers who should know better" for his advocacy in favor of elective curricula and his support for Charles William Eliot of Harvard. During his tenure he managed to establish a system wherein roughly half of a student's courses would be electives, and the other half required by the faculty, though his stance would lose ground at the college over the following decades. However, this began to change starting in the 1880 with the introduction of the modern language requirement; Columbia dropped Ancient Greek as an entrance examination requirement in 1897, and Latin in 1916. This gradual thaw, along with university's move to Morningside Heights just prior to World War I, set the stage for a major change in curricular focus in the early 20th century.

=== "Contemporary Civilization" ===
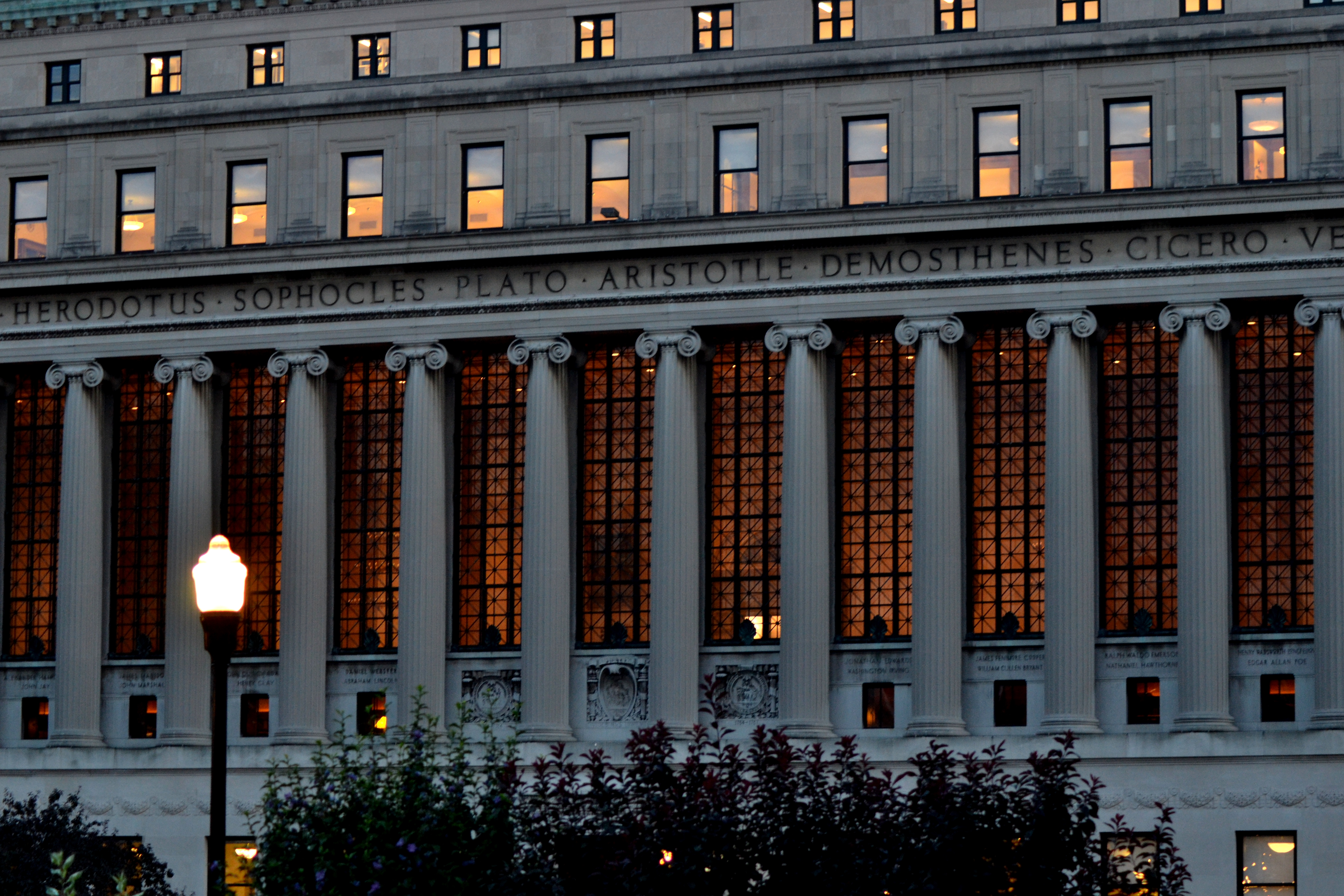
Of the names listed on the Butler Library colonnade, only Demosthenes has not at some point in time been required reading in the Core Curriculum.

In 1917, the United States Army commissioned the university to create a "war issues" course in order to educate the Student Army Training Corps, and to explain the causes of WWI and the reasons for US involvement in the conflict. Following the war, in 1919, this course was transformed into "Contemporary Civilization," the oldest course of the Core Curriculum, which faculty presented as a "peace issues" course intended to confront the realities of the post-war era. Writing about "Contemporary Civilization", Dean Herbert Hawkes stated that "its significance rested on the fundamental principle that in the long run man's accomplishment can rise no higher than his ideals, and that an understanding of the worth of the cause for which one is fighting is a powerful weapon in the hands of an intelligent man."

In 1928, "Contemporary Civilization" was enlarged and split into two courses: "Introduction to Contemporary Civilization in the West" or "CC-A", focusing on Western history from 1200 to the present, and "Contemporary Problems in the United States" or "CC-B", which emphasized questions of modern politics and economics. In 1932, "CC-B" was revised in the face of the Great Depression to center the questions of economic security, institutions, and policies. The course was dropped altogether in 1968, while the "CC-A" syllabus was overhauled to focus on politics and revolution in response to the 1968 student protests, and evolved into the course it is today.

=== The humanities sequence ===
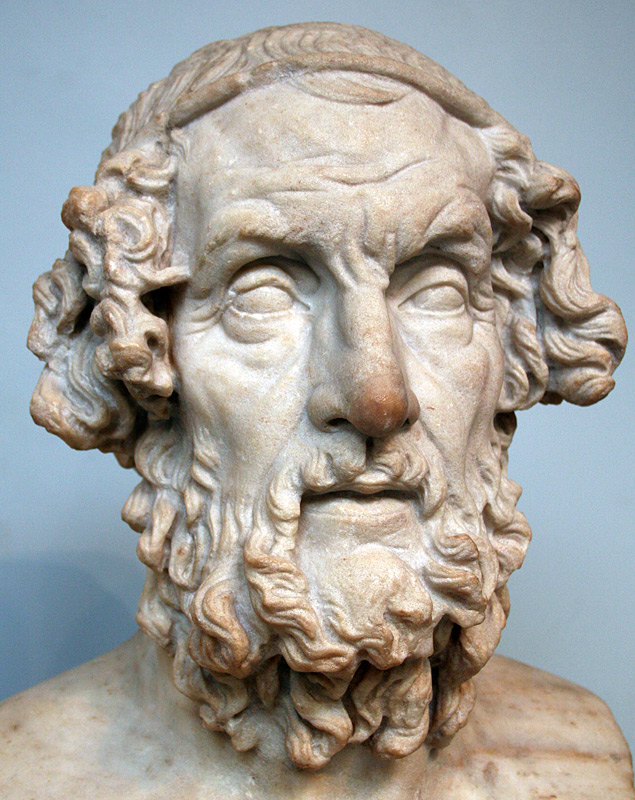
The Iliad, traditionally attributed to the Greek poet Homer, is one of the few works that has never left the Core Curriculum.

The "General Honors" course was instituted in 1920, formed around a list of "Great Books" created by professor John Erskine, who would go on to create the core curriculum at the University of Chicago. The course was discontinued in 1929, but was resurrected three years later as the "Colloquium in Important Books". The Great Books curriculum was officially incorporated into the Core in 1937 with the inauguration of the humanities sequence, which consisted of "Humanities A", a first-year survey of Western literature and philosophy from classical antiquity to the end of the 18th century, and "Humanities B", a sophomore elective that covered the visual arts and music. Structured after "Contemporary Civilization", "Humanities A" expected students to read one book per week, a workload that placed burdens on freshmen. "Humanities A" eventually morphed into the modern "Masterpieces of Western Literature" course, and "Humanities B" split into "Music Humanities" and "Art Humanities" in 1941. The list of books read in "Literature Humanities" would constantly shift over time; the first female author to be included in the curriculum was Jane Austen with the addition of Pride and Prejudice to the syllabus in 1985, two years after Columbia College became coeducational, while the first Black author to be incorporated into "Literature Humanities" was Toni Morrison, whose Song of Solomon was added in 2015.

=== Changes to the Core ===
In the later half of the 20th century, many US universities moved towards a more elective system. Some historians see the change as a response to social activism—the civil rights, feminist, and various other social movements saw the Core Curriculum as an inflexible way to promote the canon of "dead white males" and as a failure to acknowledge the essential contributions of other global cultures. Others interpret it as a concession to increasing calls for earlier specialization to prepare students for post-graduate scientific and professional studies.

The Extended Core was created in 1990 following a report from professor Wm. Theodore de Bary in which he urged the university to expand the Core to include topics in non-Western cultures, in line with its original mission to facilitate discussion in contemporary issues. It consisted of a requirement that students take two courses in non-Western cultures from a list drawn up by the Committee on the Core Curriculum, and was soon renamed to "Major Cultures". Following a 2007 hunger strike which called for increased funding ethnic studies, a reform of the Core, and revisions to the university's Manhattanville expansion plan, Major Cultures was replaced in 2008 with the Global Core. The oldest course in the Global Core is the "Colloquium on Major Texts", more commonly known as "Asian Humanities", a course on Asian classics which was established in 1947 by de Bary as "Oriental Humanities".

The most recent addition to the Core is "Frontiers of Science", which includes a set of analytical approaches that apply to all disciplines of science. "Frontiers of Science" is taught as four three-week units: two from the physical sciences and two from the life sciences.

== Structure ==
=== Requirements ===
All first-year students in Columbia College must take the year-long "Masterpieces of Western Literature" course (also known as "Literature Humanities" or "Lit Hum"), the semester-long "University Writing" ("UW"), and the semester-long "Frontiers of Science" ("FroSci"). All sophomores are required to take a year of "Contemporary Civilization" ("CC"). The other requirements, which can be completed any year, include a semester of "Masterpieces of Western Music" ("Music Humanities" or "Music Hum"); a semester of "Masterpieces of Western Art" ("Art Humanities" or "Art Hum"); two semesters of science; four semesters of a foreign language; two semesters of the Global Core; and two semesters of physical education. Students are also required to pass a swimming test before receiving their diplomas, a common feature among Ivy League colleges.

Undergraduates in the School of Engineering and Applied Science take approximately half of Columbia College's Core requirements. They are required to take either "Literature Humanities", "Contemporary Civilization", or the Global Core; either "Art Humanities" or "Music Humanities"; and "University Writing"; in addition to two semesters of physical education. The "Technical Core" consists of the semester-long "The Art of Engineering", as well as requirements in calculus, chemistry, computer science, and physics.
