= Fu Foundation School of Engineering and Applied Science =

School of Columbia University in New York

Coordinates: 40.8094°N 73.9600°W

The Fu Foundation School of Engineering and Applied Science
- Former names: School of Mines (1863–1896); School of Mines, Engineering and Chemistry (1896–1997)
- Type: Private engineering and applied science school
- Established: 1863 (163 years ago)
- Parent institution: Columbia University
- Endowment: US$400 million
- Dean: Shih-Fu Chang
- Location: New York City, New York, U.S.
- Website: engineering.columbia.edu

The Fu Foundation School of Engineering and Applied Science (also known as SEAS or Columbia Engineering) is the engineering school of Columbia University, a private research university in New York City. It was founded as the School of Mines in 1863 and then the School of Mines, Engineering and Chemistry before becoming the School of Engineering and Applied Science. On October 1, 1997, the school was renamed in honor of Chinese businessman Fu Zaiyuan, who had donated US$26 million to the school.

The Fu Foundation School of Engineering and Applied Science maintains a close research tie with other institutions, including NASA, IBM, MIT, and The Earth Institute. Patents owned by the school generate over $100 million annually for the university. SEAS faculty and alumni are responsible for technological achievements including the developments of FM radio and the maser.

The SEAS faculty include twenty-seven members of the National Academy of Engineering and one Nobel laureate. In all, the faculty and alumni of Columbia Engineering have won ten Nobel Prizes in physics, chemistry, medicine, and economics.

The school consists of approximately 300 undergraduates in each graduating class and maintains close links with its undergraduate liberal arts sister school Columbia College which shares housing with SEAS students. The school's dean is Shih-Fu Chang, who was appointed in 2022.

== History ==
=== Original charter of 1754 ===
Included in the original charter for Columbia College was the direction to teach "the arts of Number and Measuring, of Surveying and Navigation [...] the knowledge of [...] various kinds of Meteors, Stones, Mines and Minerals, Plants and Animals, and everything useful for the Comfort, the Convenience and Elegance of Life." Engineering has always been a part of Columbia, even before the establishment of any separate school of engineering.

An early and influential graduate from the school was John Stevens, Class of 1768. Instrumental in the establishment of U.S. patent law, Stevens procured many patents in early steamboat technology, operated the first steam ferry between New York and New Jersey, received the first railroad charter in the U.S., built a pioneer locomotive, and amassed a fortune, which allowed his sons to found the Stevens Institute of Technology. (Excerpt from SEAS website.)

When Columbia University first resided on Wall Street, engineering did not have a school under the Columbia umbrella. After Columbia outgrew its space on Wall Street, it relocated to what is now Midtown Manhattan in 1857. Then President Barnard and the trustees of the university, with the urging of Professor Thomas Egleston and General Vinton, approved the School of Mines in 1863. The intention was to establish a School of Mines and Metallurgy with a three-year program open to professionally motivated students with or without prior undergraduate training. It was officially founded in 1864 under the leadership of its first dean, Columbia professor Charles F. Chandler, and specialized in mining and mineralogical engineering.

In 1873, James R. Priest became the first Black student to graduate from the School of Mines.

An example of work from a student at the School of Mines was William Barclay Parsons, Class of 1882. He was an engineer on the Chinese railway and the Cape Cod and Panama Canals. Most importantly he worked for New York, as a chief engineer of the city's first subway system, the Interborough Rapid Transit Company. Opened in 1904, the subway's electric cars took passengers from City Hall to Brooklyn, the Bronx, and the newly renamed and relocated Columbia University in Morningside Heights, its present location on the Upper West Side of Manhattan.

=== Renaming to the School of Mines ===
In 1896, the school was renamed to the "School of Mines, Engineering and Chemistry". During this time, the university was offering more than the previous name had implied, thus the change of name.

The faculty during this time included Michael I. Pupin, after whom Pupin Hall is named. Pupin himself was a graduate of the Class of 1883 and the inventor of the "Pupin coil", a device that extended the range of long-distance telephones. Students of his included Irving Langmuir, Nobel laureate in Chemistry (1932), inventor of the gas-filled tungsten lamp and a contributor to the development of the radio vacuum tube. Another student to work with Pupin was Edwin Howard Armstrong, inventor of FM radio. After graduating in 1913 Armstrong was stationed in France during World War I. There he developed the superheterodyne receiver to detect the frequency of enemy aircraft ignition systems. During this period, Columbia was also home to the "Father of Biomedical Engineering" Elmer L. Gaden.

=== Recent and future developments ===
School bulletin, from the era before the most recent name change

The university continued to evolve and expand as the United States became a major political power during the 20th century. In 1926, the newly renamed School of Engineering prepared students for the nuclear age. Graduating with a master's degree, Hyman George Rickover, working with the Navy's Bureau of Ships, directed the development of the world's first nuclear-powered submarine, the Nautilus, which was launched in 1954.

The school's first woman graduate received her degree in 1945. After a substantial grant of US$26 million from Chinese businessman Fu Zaiyuan, the engineering school was renamed again in 1997. The new name, as it is known today is the Fu Foundation School of Engineering and Applied Science. SEAS continues to be a teaching and research institution, now with a large endowment of over $400 million, and sits under the Columbia umbrella endowment of $7.2 billion.

== Admissions ==
The admissions rate for the SEAS undergraduate class of 2018 was approximately 7%.

Approximately 95% of accepted students were in the top 10% of their graduating class; 99% were in the top 20% of their class. 58% of admitted students attended high schools that do not rank. The yield rate for the class of 2014 was 59%.

As for SAT scores, SEAS students within the Columbia University community have raised the composite SAT statistic for the undergraduates at Columbia University. The Class of 2013's SAT interquartile range was 2060–2320 and 1400–1560 (old SAT). The ACT composite interquartile range was 32–34.

Those accepting enrollment at Columbia SEAS typically completed engineering programs at the undergraduate level and are pursuing professional graduate school in engineering, business, law, or medical school, so as to become what Columbia terms "engineering leaders." Engineering leaders are those who pioneer or define engineering: patent lawyers, doctors with specialties in biophysical engineering, financial engineers, inventors, etc.

Columbia Engineering's graduate programs have an overall acceptance rate of 28.0% in 2010. The PhD student–faculty ratio at the graduate level is 4.2:1 according to the 2008 data compiled by U.S. News & World Report. PhD acceptance rate was 12% in 2010.

== Academics ==
=== Rankings ===
As of April 2022, it is ranked 13th among the best engineering schools by U.S. News & World Report, and first within the Ivy League, tied with Cornell University. Its undergraduate engineering program is ranked 21st in the country, according to U.S. News.

In 2010, the US National Research Council revealed its new analyses and rankings of American university doctoral programs since 1995. Columbia Engineering ranked 10th in biomedical engineering, 18th in chemical engineering, 26th in electrical engineering, 14th in mechanical engineering (5th in research), 9th in operations research & industrial engineering, 7th in applied mathematics, and 6th in computer sciences.

The school's department of computer science is ranked 11th in the nation, 36th in the world by U.S. News & World Report, and 18th worldwide by QS World University Rankings. Its biomedical engineering program is ranked 9th according to US News.

Among the small prestigious programs, the school's chemical engineering is ranked 20th, civil engineering and engineering mechanics 18th, electrical engineering 3rd, applied physics 4th, industrial engineering and operations research 4th, material engineering 10th, computer science 15th, and applied mathematics 15th, according to National Science Foundation. From The Chronicle of Higher Education, Columbia's engineering mechanics is 6th in the nation, its environmental engineering 4th, industrial engineering 7th, mechanical engineering 5th, applied physics 8th, and operations research 6th. Finally, Columbia's financial engineering program is ranked 3rd nationally, according to the 2020 ranking from Quantnet.

== Facilities ==
Columbia's Plasma Physics Laboratory is part of the School of Engineering and Applied Science (SEAS), in which the HBT and Columbia Non-Neutral Torus are housed.

The school also has two wind tunnels, a machine shop, a nanotechnology laboratory, a General Dynamics TRIGA Mk. II nuclear fission reactor, a large scale centrifuge for geotechnical testing, and an axial tester commonly used for testing New York City bridge cables. Each department has numerous laboratories on the Morningside Heights campus; however, other departments have holdings throughout the world. For example, the Applied Physics department has reactors at Nevis Labs in Irvington, NY and conducts work with CERN in Geneva.

== Notable alumni ==
The School of Engineering and Applied Science celebrates its ties and affiliations with at least 8 alumni Nobel Laureates. Alumni of Columbia Engineering have gone on to numerous fields of profession. Many have become prominent scientists, astronauts, architects, government officials, pioneers, entrepreneurs, company CEOs, financiers, and scholars.

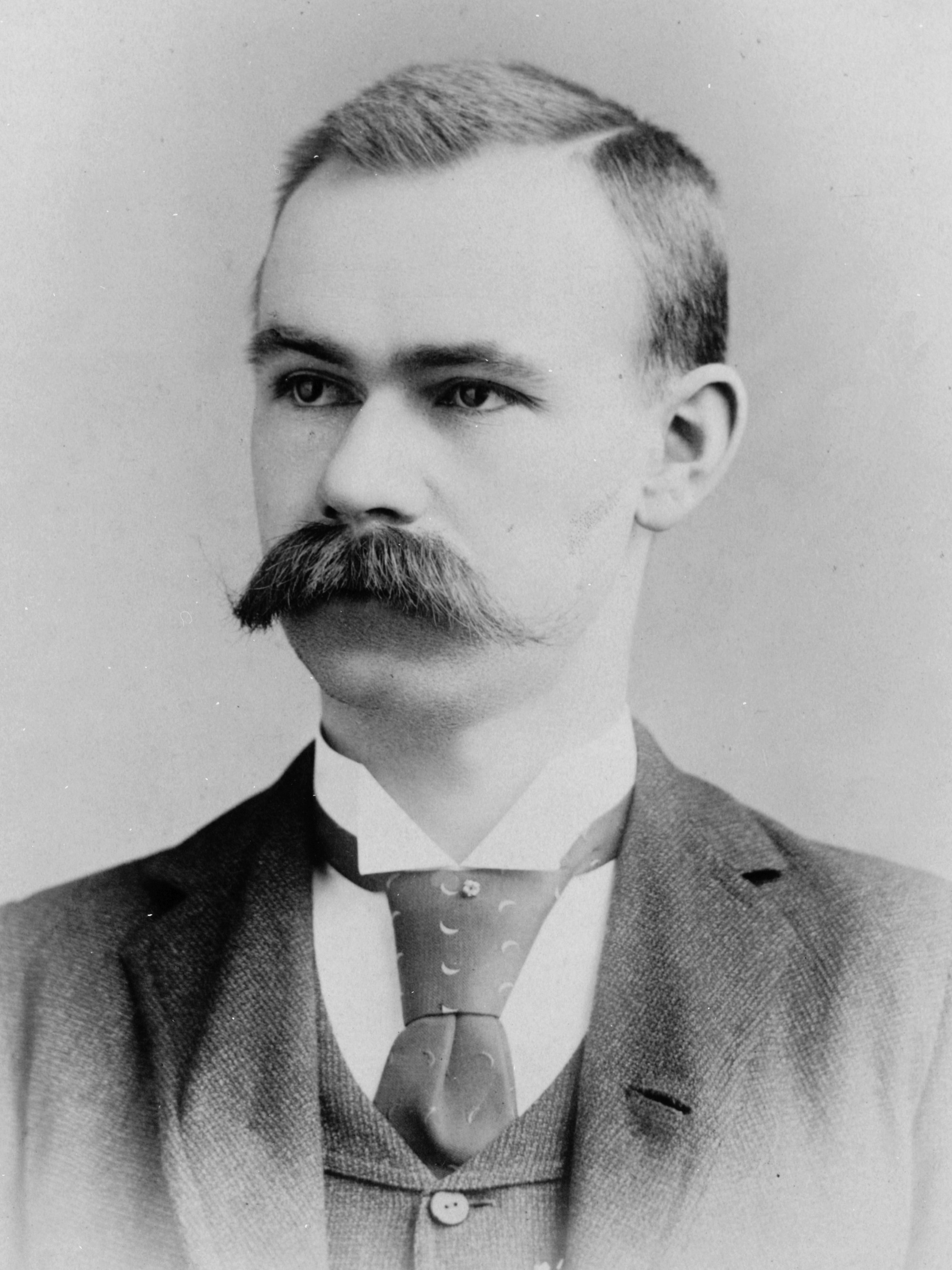
Herman Hollerith, Founded a company that merged with other companies to become IBM

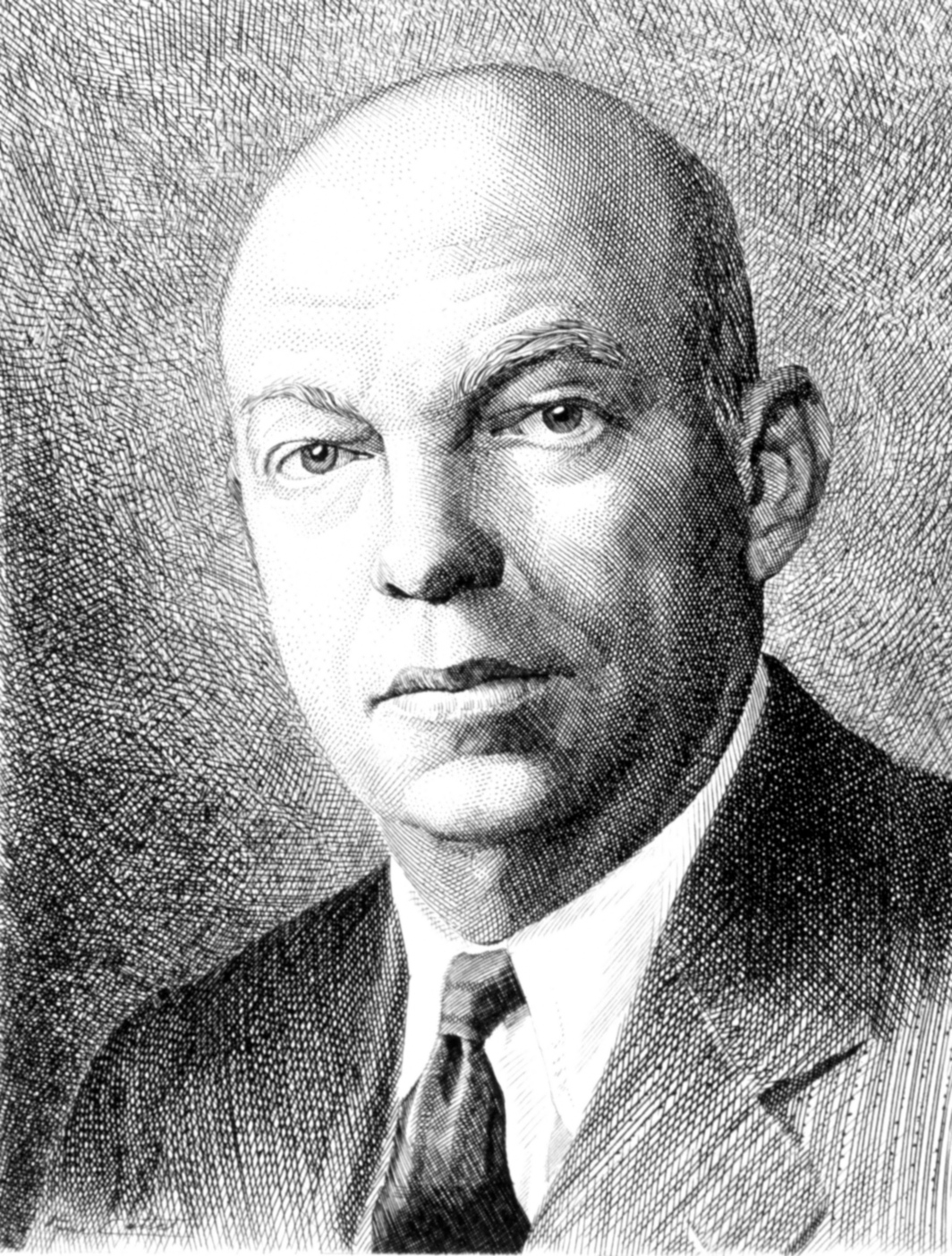
Edwin Armstrong, developer of FM Radio

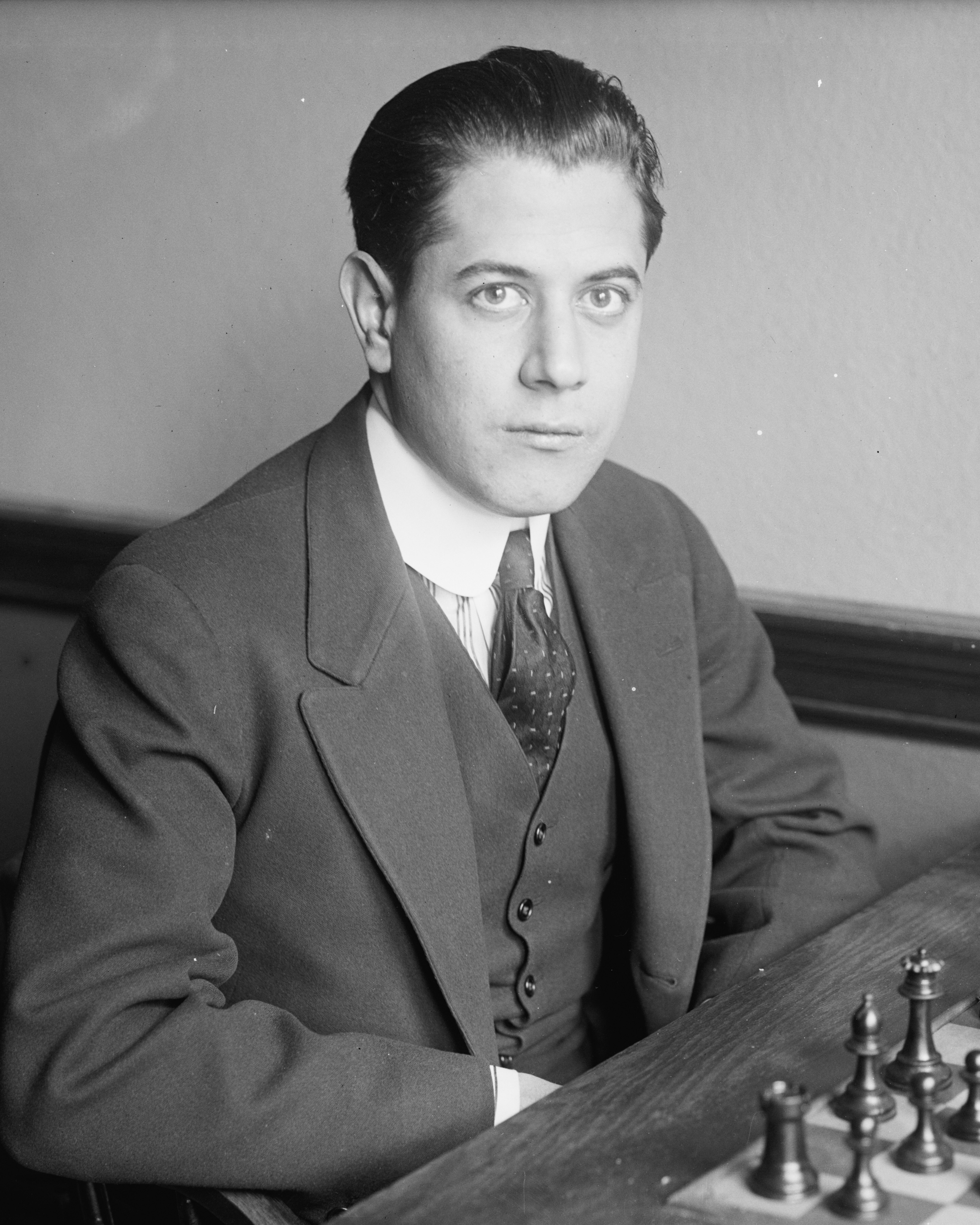
José Raúl Capablanca, Chess prodigy and the highest ranked chess player on the Elo rating system

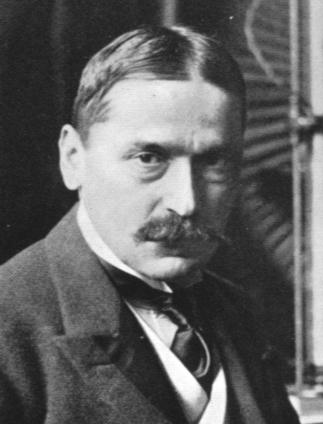
Mihaljo Pupin, Serbian-American physicist and winner of the Pulitzer Prize, namesake of Pupin Hall at Columbia University

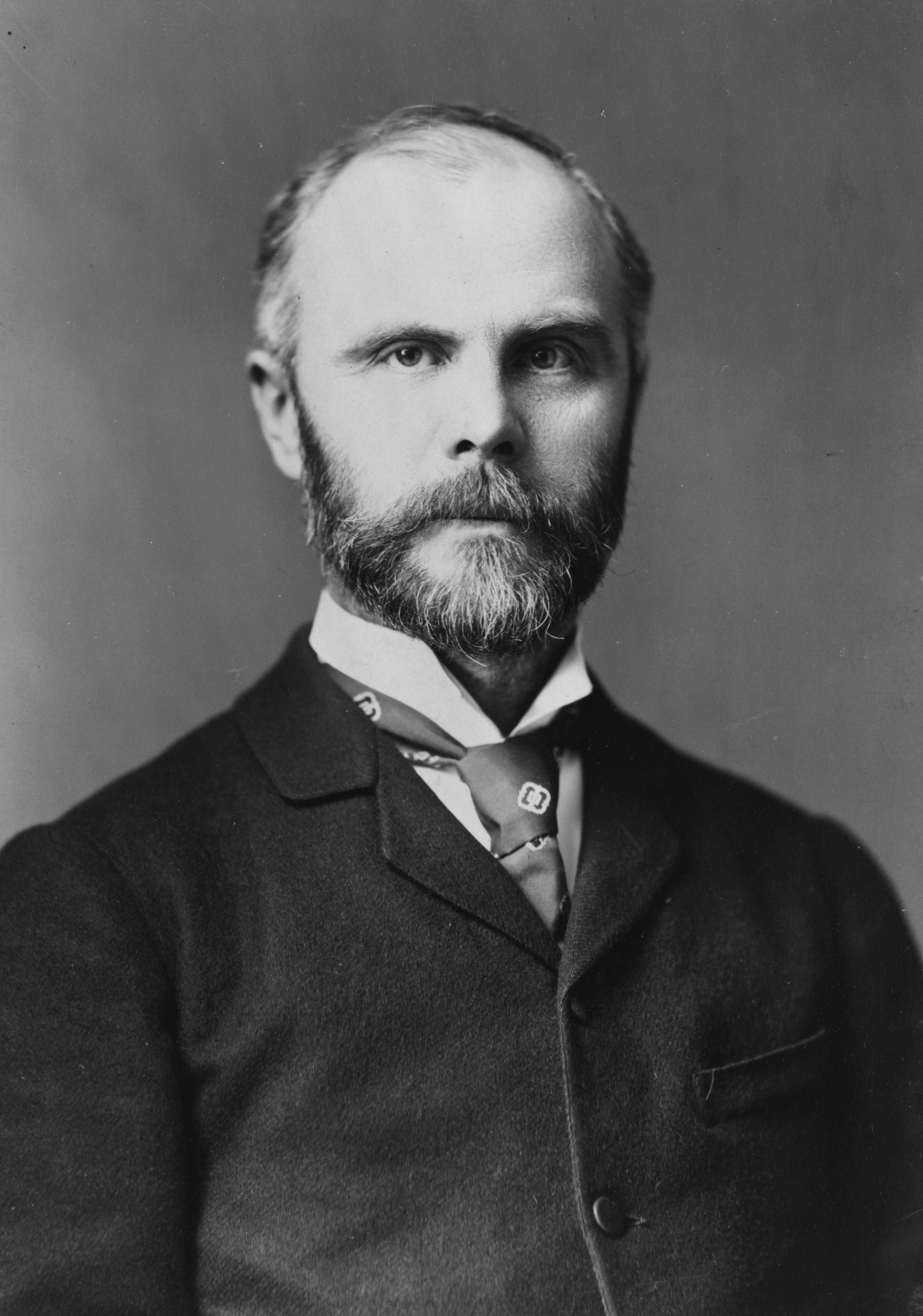
William Barclay Parsons, American civil engineer, founder of Parsons Brinckerhoff, designed and constructed the first section of the New York City Subway

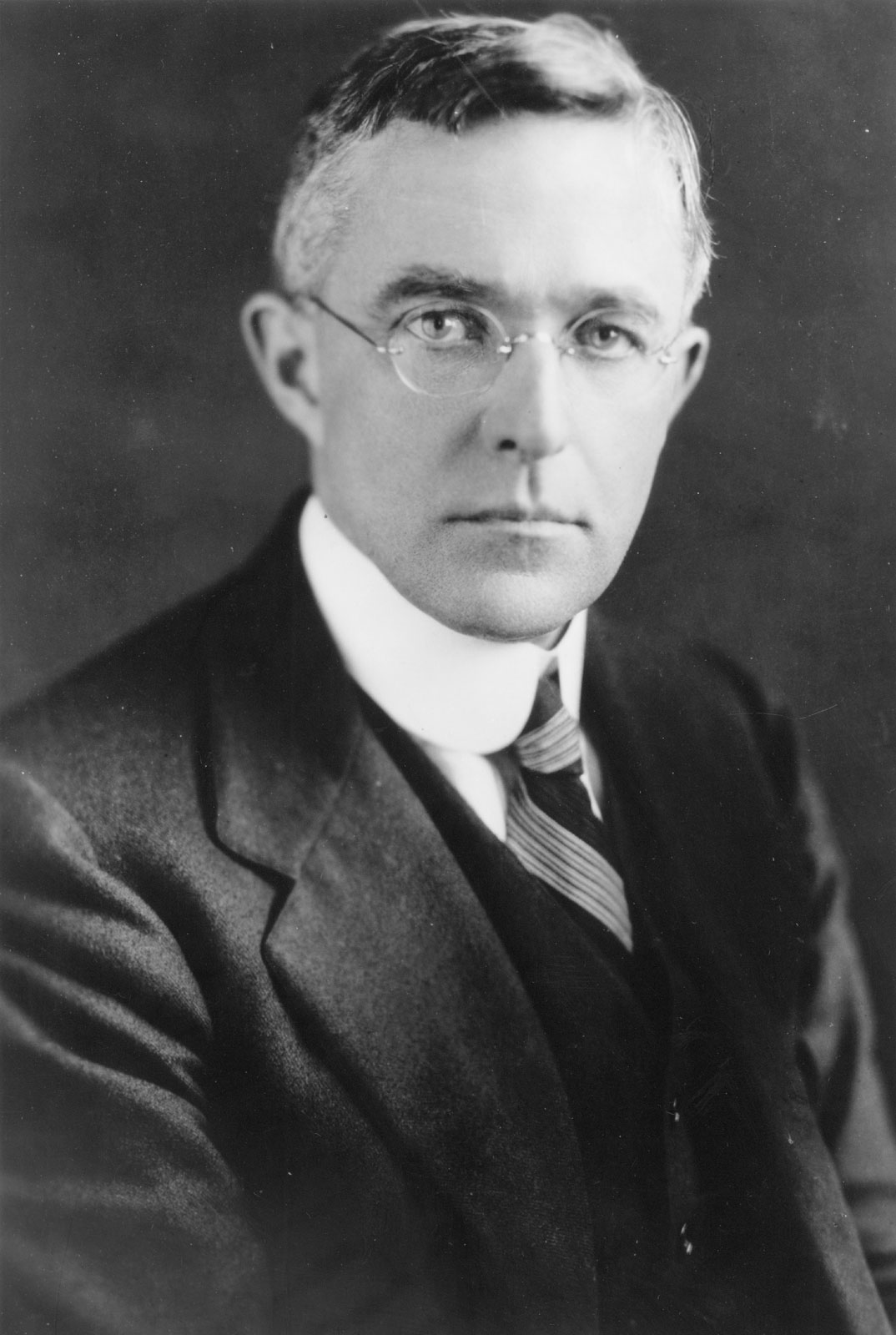
Irving Langmuir, winner of the Nobel Prize in Chemistry in 1932

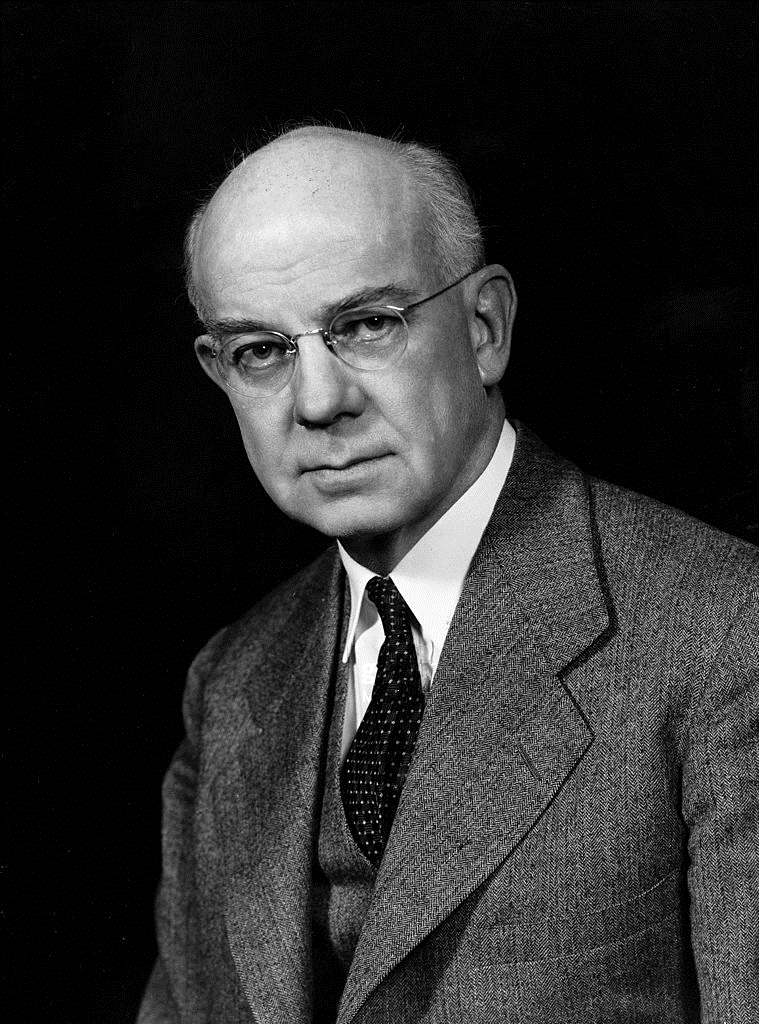
Edward Calvin Kendall, winner of the Nobel Prize in Physiology or Medicine in 1950

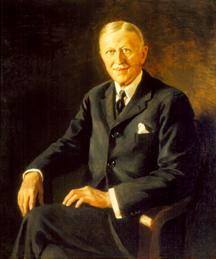
William H. Woodin, United States Secretary of the Treasury under Franklin D. Roosevelt

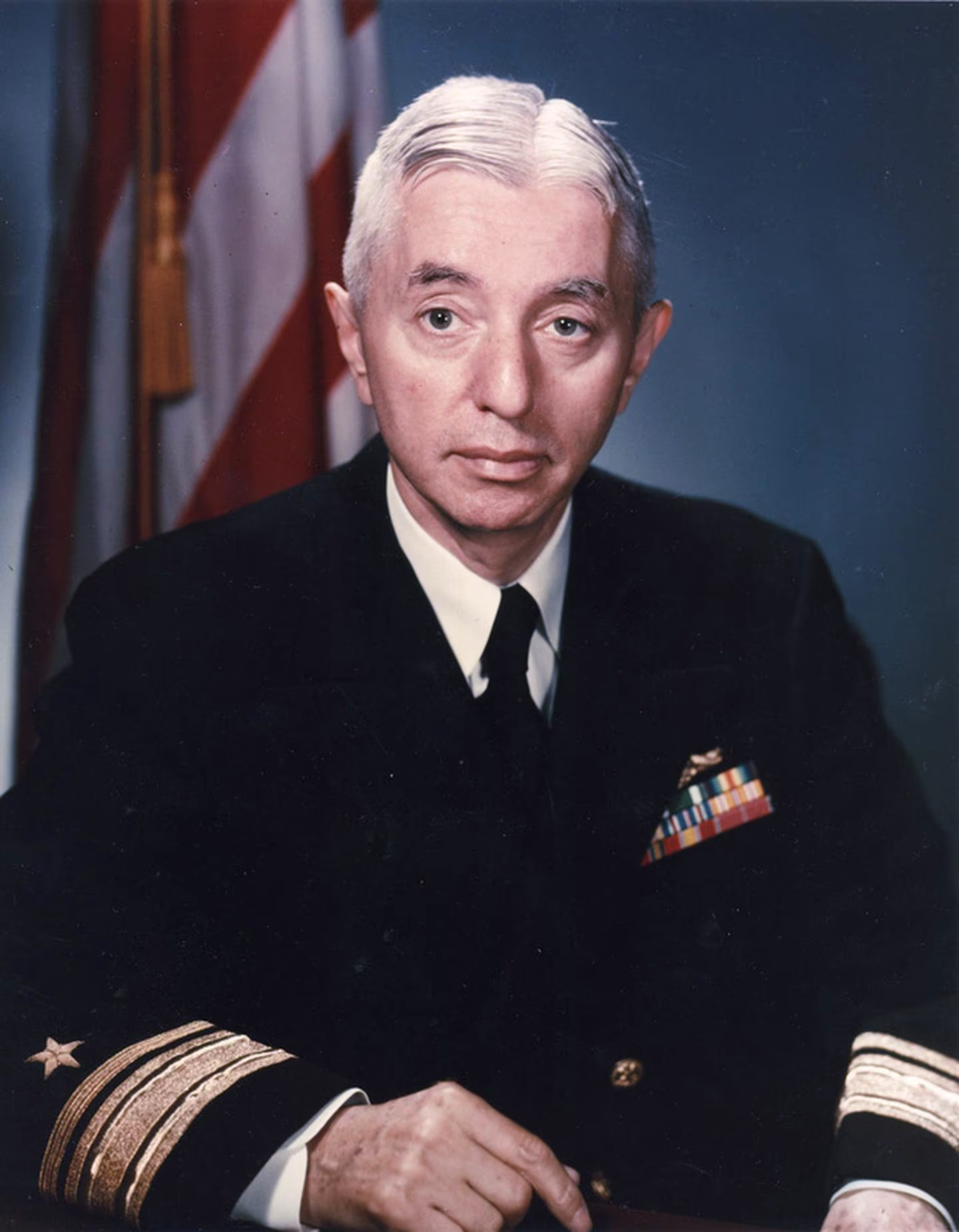
Hyman G. Rickover, admiral of the United States Navy, "Father of the Nuclear Navy"

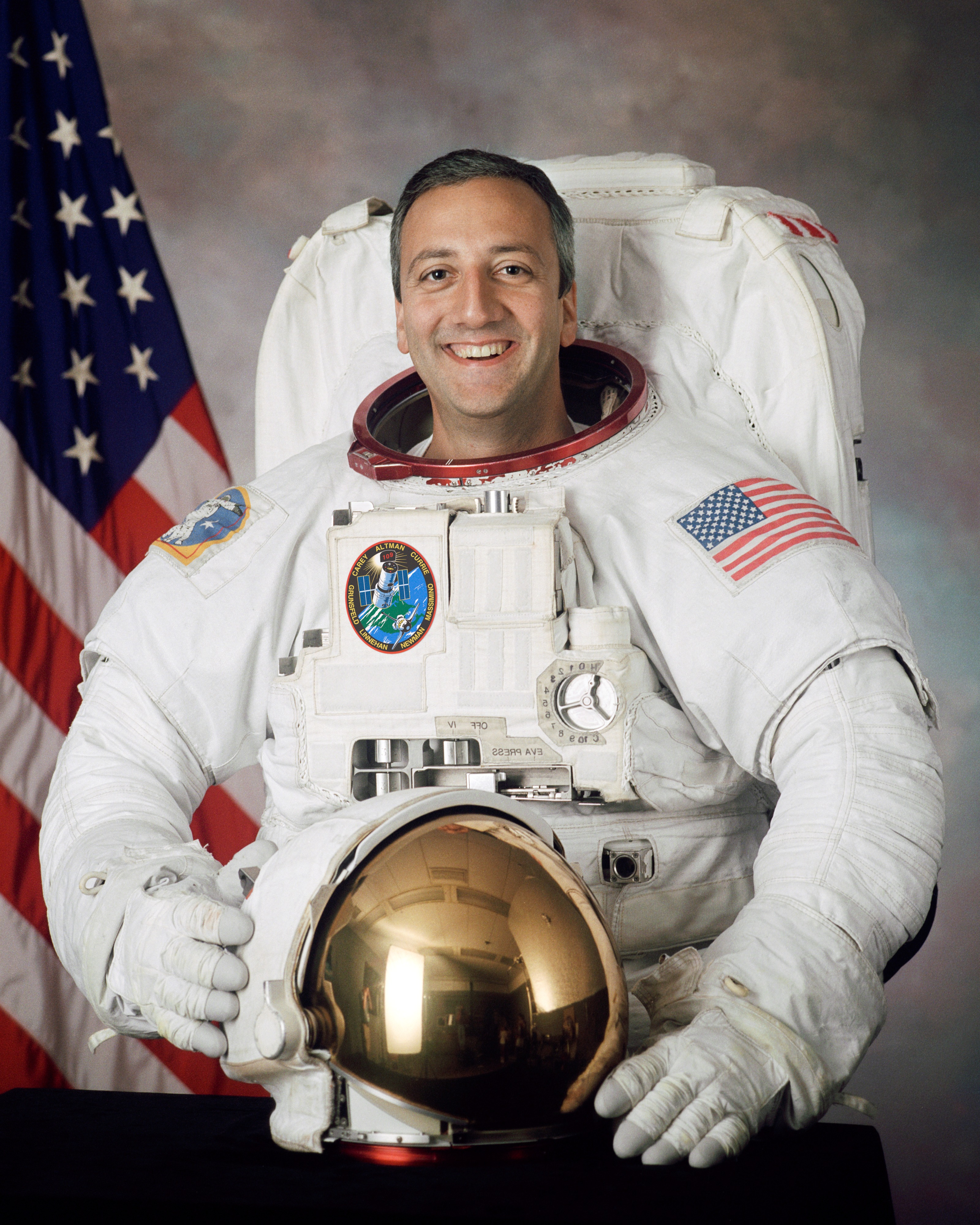
Michael Massimino, NASA astronaut

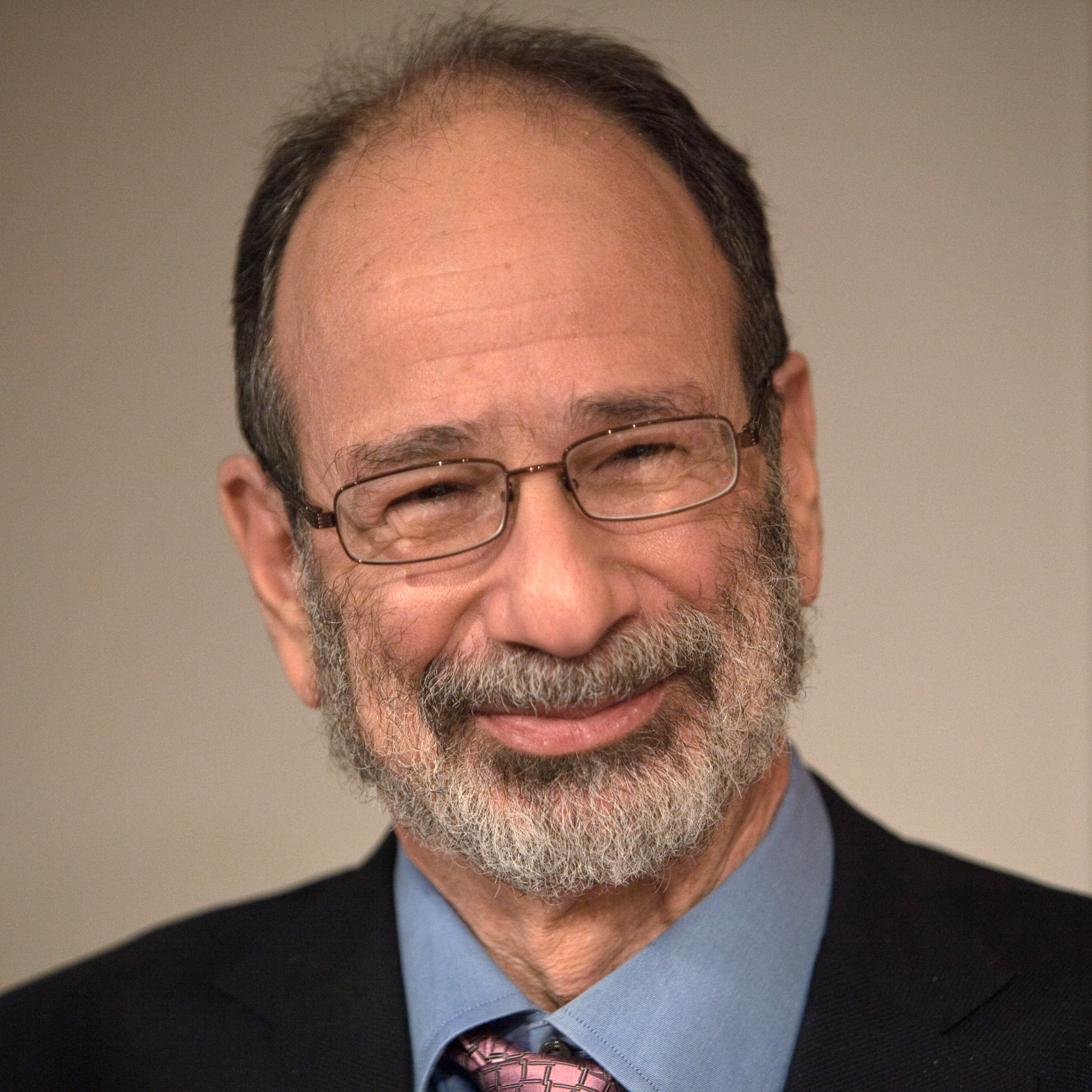
Alvin E. Roth, Economist, Winner of 2012 Nobel Memorial Prize in Economic Sciences

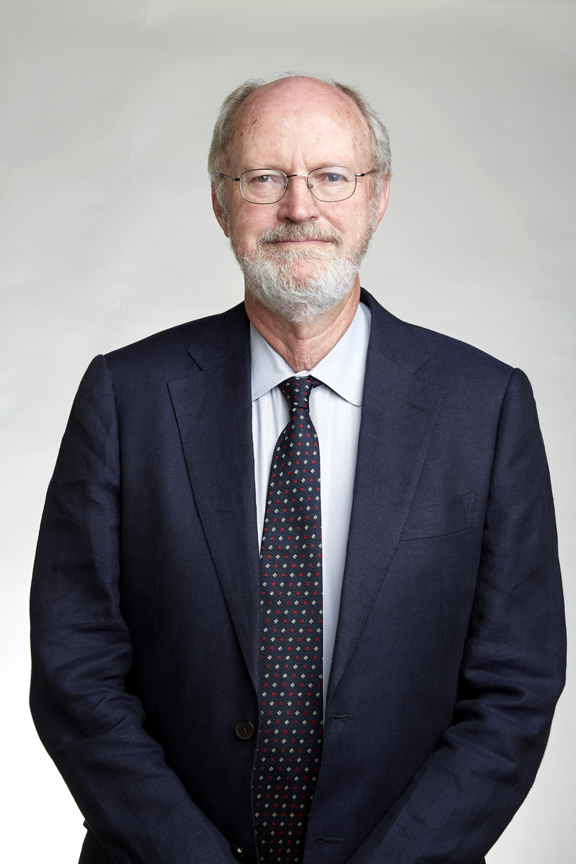
Robert H. Grubbs, winner of the Nobel Prize in Chemistry in 2005

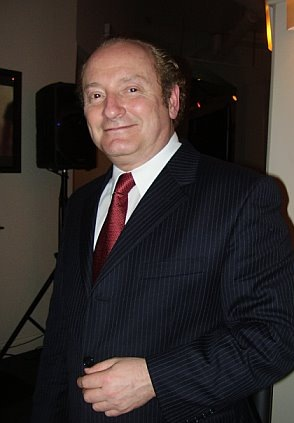
Robert C. Merton, Winner of 1997 Nobel Memorial Prize in Economic Sciences

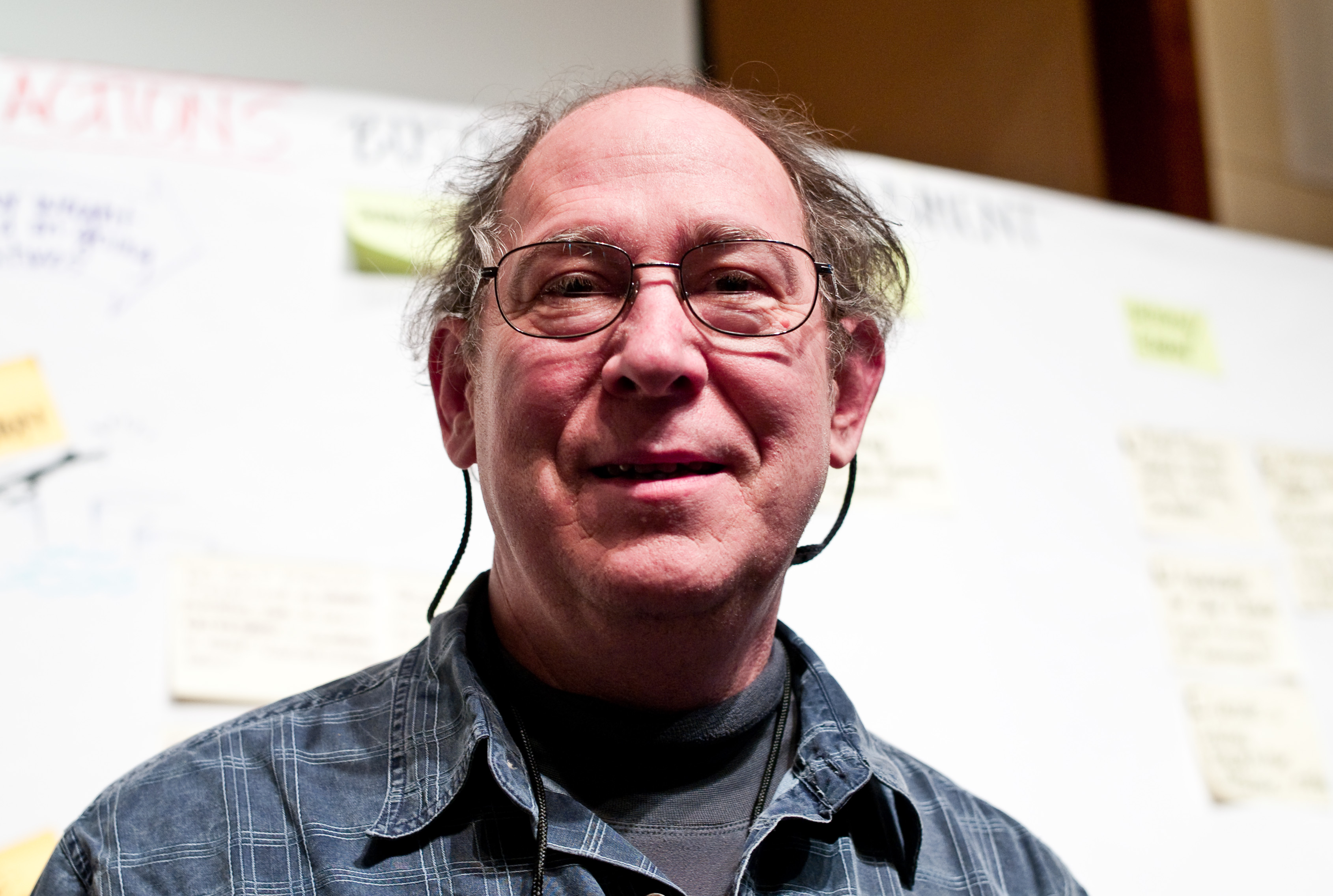
Stephen Schneider, climatologist and Nobel Peace Prize Laureate (he contributed to the work that earned the IPCC the 2007 Nobel Peace Prize; he was not a named recipient)

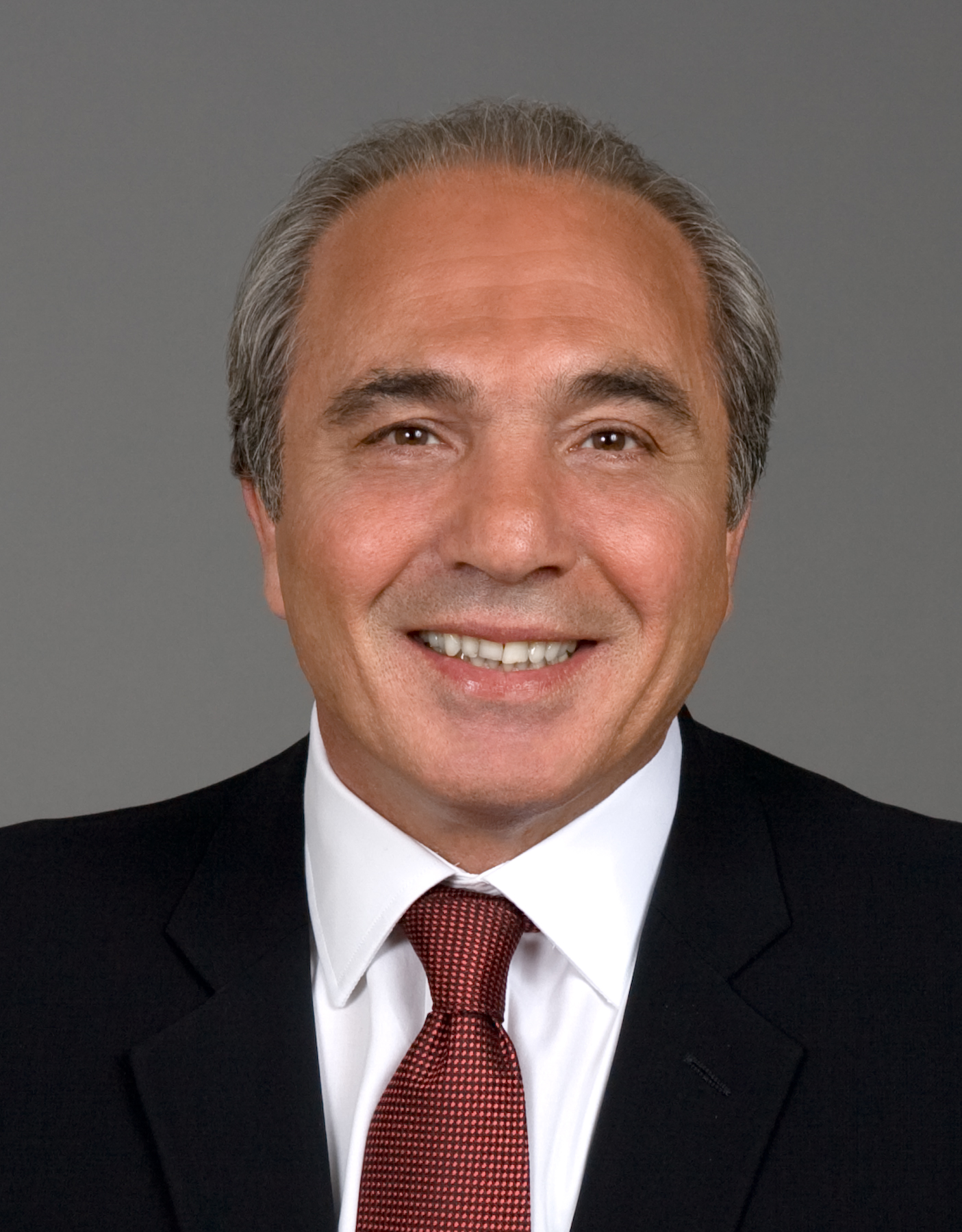
Rocco B. Commisso, American billionaire businessman, founder of Mediacom, chairman of New York Cosmos and ACF Fiorentina

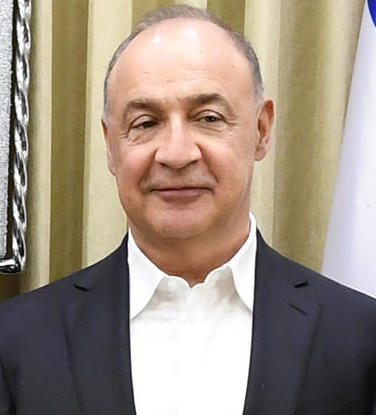
Leonard Blavatnik, Ukrainian-British billionaire businessman, founder of Access Industries

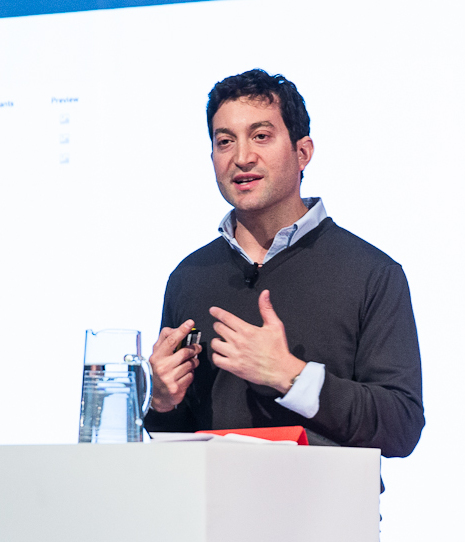
Jon Oringer, American billionaire businessman, founder of Shutterstock

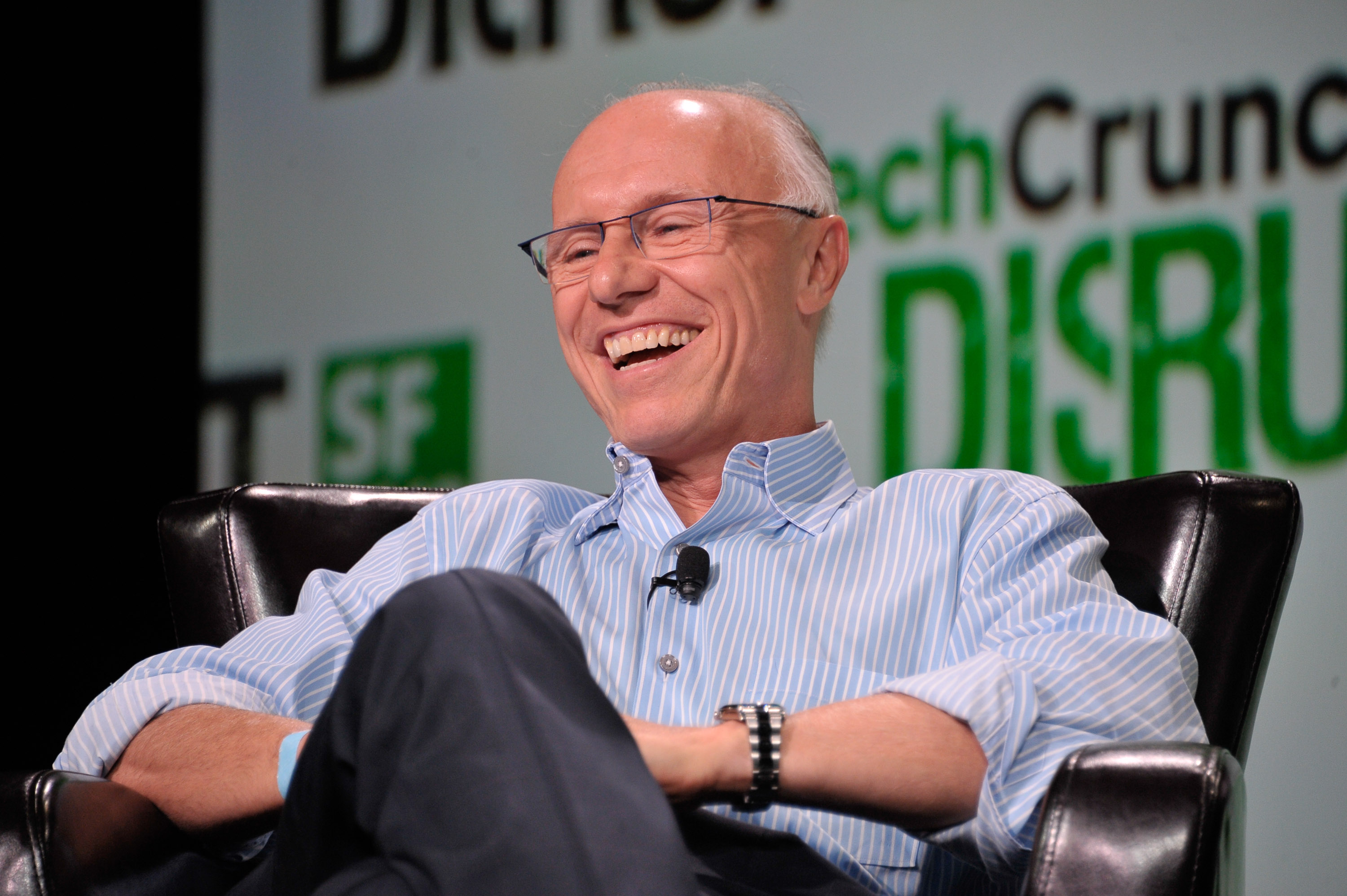
Douglas Leone, American billionaire venture capitalist and managing partner of Sequoia Capital

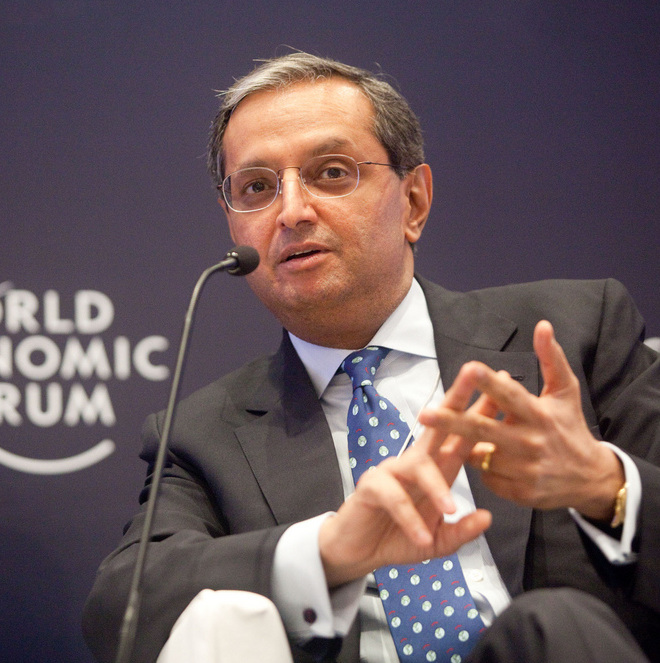
Vikram Pandit, Indian-American banker, former CEO of Citibank

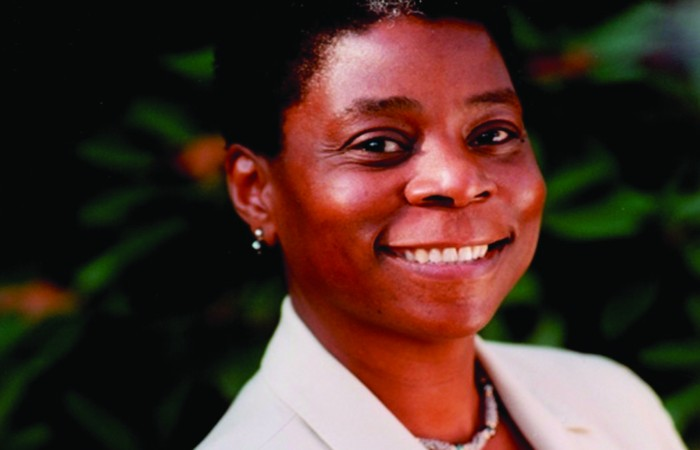
Ursula Burns, former CEO of Xerox, first African American woman to lead a Fortune 500 company
- Albert Huntington Chester (E.M. 1868, Ph.D. 1876), geologist and mining engineer, professor at Hamilton College and Rutgers College and the namesake of Chester Peak
- Henry Smith Munroe (E.M. 1869, Ph.D. 1877), Foreign advisor to Meiji Japan
- Roland Duer Irving (E.M. 1869, Ph.D. 1879), geologist, pioneer in petrography
- H. Walter Webb (E.M. 1873), executive with the New York Central Railroad
- Eben Erskine Olcott (1874), president of the American Institute of Mining, Metallurgical, and Petroleum Engineers from 1901 to 1902
- Louis Pope Gratacap (Ph.B. 1876), curator of mineralogy at the American Museum of Natural History
- Frederick Remsen Hutton (E.M. 1876), secretary of the American Society of Mechanical Engineers from 1883 to 1906
- Marcus Benjamin (Ph.B. 1878), editor
- William Hamilton Russell (1878), architect who founded firm Clinton and Russell; designed the American International Building, Hotel Astor, Graham Court, The Langham and other New York landmarks
- William L. Ward (1878), United States Congressman from New York
- Nathaniel Lord Britton (1879), co-founder of the New York Botanical Garden
- Hamilton Castner (1879), American industrial chemist famous for developing the Castner–Kellner process
- Graeme Hammond (1879), American neurologist, Olympic fencer; founding president of the Amateur Fencers League of America
- Herman Hollerith (1879), founded a company that merged with other companies to become IBM
- Charles Buxton Going (1882), engineer, author, editor
- William Parsons (1882), Chief Engineer of New York City's subway system
- Mihajlo Idvorski Pupin (B.S. 1883), Serbian physicist and physical chemist whose inventions include the Pupin coil, winner of Pulitzer Prize for his autobiography
- Edward Chester Barnard (1884), American topographer with the United States Geological Survey
- James Furman Kemp (1884), geologist; president of the Geological Society of America
- Joseph Harvey Ladew Sr. (1885), founder of leather manufacturer Fayerweather & Ladew
- Frederick James Hamilton Merrill (1885), geologist and former director of the New York State Museum
- Edward Pearce Casey (1886), architect known for designing the Taft Bridge and Ulysses S. Grant Memorial
- Walter Hull Aldridge (1887), President and Chairman of the Texas Gulf Sulphur Company; recipient of the John Fritz Medal and the William Lawrence Saunders Gold Medal
- Jennings Cox (1887), mining engineer credited with inventing the cocktail Daiquiri
- Graham Lusk (1887), American physiologist and nutritionist
- Allen Tucker (1887), architect and artist
- Edwin Gould I (1888), American investor and railway official; son of financier Jay Gould
- F. Augustus Heinze (1889), copper magnate and founder of United Copper; one of the three "Copper Kings" of Butte, Montana
- Winifred Edgerton Merrill (PhD. 1889), first American woman to receive a Ph.D. in mathematics
- James Monroe Hewlett (1890), American architect who created the mural on the ceiling of the Grand Central Terminal
- George Oakley Totten Jr. (1891), prolific architect in Washington, D.C., who designed Meridian Hall, the Embassy of Turkey, Washington, D.C., and the Embassy of Ecuador in Washington, D.C.
- John Stone Stone (1890s), early telephone engineer
- Herschel Clifford Parker (PhB. 1890), physicist and mountaineer
- William H. Woodin (1890), American industrialist, 51st United States Secretary of the Treasury
- Gano Dunn (1891), former president of Cooper Union and recipient of IEEE Edison Medal; former chairman and CEO of the National Research Council
- Gonzalo de Quesada y Aróstegui (1891), Cuban revolutionary, minister to the United States, signer of the Hay-Quesada Treaty
- Heinrich Ries (1892), American economic geologist; professor at Cornell University
- Chester Holmes Aldrich (PhB. 1893), former director of American Academy in Rome and architect who designed the Kykuit
- V. Everit Macy (PhB, 1893), American industrialist, former president of the National Civic Federation, major benefactor to Teachers College, Columbia University
- Kenneth MacKenzie Murchison (1894), American architect who designed the Havana Central railway station, Pennsylvania Station in Baltimore, and the Murchison Building in Wilmington, North Carolina
- Gustavus Town Kirby (1895), president of the Amateur Athletic Union and member of the United States Olympic Committee from 1896 to 1956
- Leon Moisseiff (1895), American engineer and designer of the Manhattan Bridge
- George Gustav Heye (EE. 1896), investment banker and founder of the National Museum of the American Indian in New York, and namesake of the George Gustav Heye Center
- Ambrose Monell (1896), American industrialist, first president of International Nickel Company, namesake of the Monel alloy
- Alfred Chester Beatty (E.M. 1898), mining magnate and millionaire, often referred to as "King of Copper", founder of the Chester Beatty Library in Dublin
- Albertson Van Zo Post (1899), fencer and writer
- Hugh Auchincloss Brown (E.E. 1900), electrical engineer and conspiracy theorist, proponent of the cataclysmic pole shift hypothesis, member of the Auchincloss family
- Reno H. Sales (E. M. 1900), Chief Geologist of Anaconda Copper, "father of mining geology"
- Richard E. Dougherty (C.E. 1901), vice president of New York Central System and president of the American Society of Civil Engineers
- Irving Langmuir (1903), Winner of the 1932 Nobel Prize in Chemistry, produced gas-filled incandescent lamp, explorer of the vacuum
- Don Gelasio Caetani (1903), mayor of Rome and Italian ambassador to the United States
- Stephen J. Pigott (1903), American marine engineer, managing director of John Brown & Company
- Robert Stangland (1904), Olympic athlete; bronze medalist in Athletics at the 1904 Summer Olympics
- Peter Cooper Hewitt (1906), engineer who invented the first Mercury-vapor lamp in 1901, the Hewitt-Sperry Automatic Airplane, and the Mercury-arc valve, son of New York mayor and philanthropist Abram Hewitt
- Reginald J. S. Pigott (1906), former president of the Society of Automotive Engineers and the American Society of Mechanical Engineers
- Edward Calvin Kendall (1908), Winner of 1950 Nobel Prize for Physiology or Medicine
- Edmund Prentis (B.S. 1906), former president of the American Standards Association, art collector
- Roger W. Toll (B.S. 1906), mountaineer, former superintendent of Mount Rainier, Rocky Mountain, and Yellowstone National Parks
- James Kip Finch (B.S. 1906), American engineer and educator, dean of Columbia Engineering from 1941 to 1950
- Maurice L. Sindeband (E.E. 1907), American electrical engineer, former president of the Ogden Corporation
- Kingdon Gould Sr. (E.M. 1909), financier and polo player; father of ambassador Kingdon Gould Jr.
- Grover Loening (M.S. 1910), American aircraft manufacturer, designer of first successful monoplane
- José Raúl Capablanca (1910), one of the greatest chess players of all time
- Alfonso Valdés Cobián (E.E. 1911), Puerto Rican industrialist, co-founder of Compañía Cervecera de Puerto Rico
- Eugene Dooman (1912), counselor at the U.S. Embassy in Tokyo vital in the negotiations between the U.S. and Japan before World War II
- David Steinman (PhD. 1911), director of the reconstruction of Brooklyn Bridge
- Harry Babcock (1912), 1912 Olympic champion in pole vaulting
- Harvey Seeley Mudd (B.S. 1912), Metallurgical Engineer, president of Cyprus Mines Corporation, co-founder of Claremont McKenna College and namesake of Harvey Mudd College of Engineering
- Richard Cunningham Patterson Jr. (E.M. 1912), United States Ambassador to Yugoslavia, United States Ambassador to Switzerland, United States Ambassador to Guatemala
- Edwin Armstrong (E.E. 1913), inventor of the frequency modulation transmission method
- Willard F. Jones (M.S. 1916), naval architect, head of National Safety Council's marine section and Vice President of Gulf Oil
- Seeley G. Mudd (B.S. 1917), American physician, professor and major philanthropist to academic institutions; namesake of the Seeley G. Mudd Manuscript Library of Princeton University
- Philip Sporn (E.E. 1917), Austrian engineer and recipient of IEEE Edison Medal; former president and CEO of American Electric Power
- Allen Carpé (E.E. 1919), first person to have climbed Mount Bona, Mount Fairweather, and Mount Logan
- Radu Irimescu (1920), former Romanian ambassador to the United States
- Langston Hughes (1922), poet of the Harlem Renaissance
- Arthur Loughren (M.S. 1925), Pioneer in radio engineering and television engineering
- Edward Lawry Norton (M.S. 1925), Bell Lab engineer, developer of Norton equivalent circuit
- Hyman Rickover (M.S. 1928), Father of the Nuclear U.S. Navy
- Hugh Alessandroni (Columbia College: B.A. 1929, SEAS: 1931), member of the US Fencing Hall of Fame, 2-time Olympian, 2-time US foil champion, 7 team national championships
- Raymond D. Mindlin (B.S. 1931), researcher and professor known for his contributions to applied mechanics, applied physics, and Engineering Sciences, recipient of National Medal of Science
- Helmut W. Schulz (B.S. 1933, M.S. 1934), President Dynecology, developed uranium centrifugation (gas centrifuge), laser analysis, safe waste conversion
- Robert D. Lilley (B.S. 1934), former president of the AT&T from 1972 to 1976
- Herbert L. Anderson (B.S. 1935), established Enrico Fermi Institute and nuclear physicist in the Manhattan Project
- Daniel C. Drucker (PhD. 1939), American engineer and recipient of National Medal of Science
- Antoine Marc Gaudin (E.M. 1921), professor at MIT and a founding member of National Academy of Engineering
- John R. Ragazzini (PhD. 1941), pioneered the development of the z-transform method in discrete-time signal processing and analysis.
- Arthur Hauspurg (B.S. 1943, M.S. 1947), chairman of Consolidated Edison
- Samuel Higginbottom (B.S. 1943), former CEO of Eastern Air Lines and Rolls-Royce North America, chairman of Columbia's board of trustees
- Richard Skalak (B.S. 1943), pioneer in Biomedical engineering
- Elmer L. Gaden (B.S. 1944), Father of Biochemical Engineering
- William F. Schreiber (B.S. 1945), electrical engineer and developer of optical recognition machine
- Sheldon E. Isakoff (B.S. 1945, M.S. 1947, PhD. 1951), chemical engineer and former director of DuPont
- Henry S. Coleman (B.S. 1946), acting dean of Columbia College, Columbia University who was held hostage during the Columbia University protests of 1968.
- Joseph F. Engelberger (B.S. 1946, M.S. 1949), Father of Industrial robotics
- Edward A. Frieman (B.S. 1946), former director of the Scripps Institution of Oceanography
- Wilmot N. Hess (B.S. 1946), former director of the National Center for Atmospheric Research from 1980 to 1986
- Ira Millstein (B.S. 1947), antitrust expert, partner at Weil, Gotshal & Manges and oldest big law partner in practice
- Bernard Spitzer (M.S. 1947), real estate developer and philanthropist, father of Eliot Spitzer, 54th governor of New York
- James H. Mulligan Jr. (PhD. 1948), American electrical engineer, former executive officer of National Academy of Engineering and president of IEEE
- Lotfi Asker Zadeh (PhD. 1949), Iranian mathematician, electrical engineer, and computer scientist
- Henry Michel (B.S. 1949), Civil Engineer, President of Parsons Brinckerhoff
- Anna Kazanjian Longobardo (B.S. 1949), founder of the National Society of Women Engineers
- Edward Jaworski (B.S. 1949), Olympic water polo player who represented the United States in the 1952 Summer Olympics
- Edmund DiGiulio (B.S. 1950), founder of the Cinema Products Corporation, five-time Academy Awards winner, inventor of the CP-16
- Eliahu I. Jury (PhD. 1953), Initiated field of discrete time systems, pioneered z-transform (the discrete time equivalent of the Laplace Transform), and created Jury stability criterion test
- Sheldon Weinig (M.S. 1953, PhD. 1955), CEO of Materials Research Corporation, Vice chairman for Engineering and Manufacturing for SONY America
- Robert Spinrad (B.S. 1953, M.S. 1954), American computer engineer and former director of Xerox Palo Alto Research Center
- Ferdinand Freudenstein (PhD. 1954), mechanical engineer, professor, and widely considered the "Father of Modern Kinematics"
- Donald R. Olander (B.S. 1954), professor at University of California, Berkeley
- Donald E. Ross (B.S. 1954), managing partner of Jaros, Baum & Bolles
- Saul Amarel (PhD. 1955), computer scientist and pioneer in artificial intelligence
- Sheldon M. Wiederhorn (B.S. 1956), material scientist at National Institute of Standards and Technology
- Robert Moog (M.S. 1957), pioneer of electronic music, inventor of the Moog synthesizer
- Rudolf Emil Kálmán (PhD. 1957), electrical engineer and recipient of National Medal of Science
- Bernard J. Lechner (B.S. 1957), electronics engineer and vice president of RCA Laboratories
- Edward Botwinick (B.S. 1958), IT entrepreneur and former president of Unisys Networks
- Joseph F. Traub (PhD. 1959), prominent computer scientist; head of the Carnegie Mellon School of Computer Science from 1971 to 1979 and founder of the Computer science department at Columbia University
- Richard G. Newman (M.S. 1960), chairman and former CEO of world-leading engineering firm AECOM
- Masanobu Shinozuka (PhD. 1960), probabilistic mechanics, structural stability, and risk assessment
- Lynn Conway (B.S. 1962, M.S. 1963), professor of electrical engineering and computer science at University of Michigan, pioneer in VLSI microchip design, and early activist for transgender rights
- Jeffrey Bleustein (PhD. 1962), former chairman and CEO of Harley-Davidson
- Roy Mankovitz (B.S. 1963), scientist, inventor, health strategist
- Jeffrey Ullman (B.S. 1963), professor at Stanford University and winner of the 2020 Turing Award
- Richard D. Gitlin (M.S. 1965, PhD. 1969) – engineer, co-invention of DSL at Bell Labs
- Robert C. Merton (B.S. 1966), Winner of the 1997 Nobel Prize in Economics and co-author of the Black–Scholes pricing model
- Stephen Schneider (B.S. 1966, Ph.D. 1971), environmental scientist at Stanford University who shared the Nobel Peace Prize in 2007
- Harry L. Tuller (B.S. 1966, M.S. 1967, Ph.D. 1973), professor of materials science at Massachusetts Institute of Technology
- Dorian M. Goldfeld (B.S. 1967), American mathematician and editor of the Journal of Number Theory
- Robert H. Grubbs (PhD 1968), California Institute of Technology professor and 2005 Nobel Prize laureate
- Lewis A. Sanders (B.S. 1968), co-founder, chairman, and CEO of AllianceBernstein
- Ira Fuchs (B.S. 1969), co-founder of BITNET, creator of LISTSERV, and JSTOR, former vice-president of Princeton University
- Jae-Un Chung (B.S. 1964, M.S. 1969), Former president, Vice chairman of Samsung Electronics and honorary chairman of Shinsegae Group, husband of Lee Myung-hee, Samsung heiress
- Feisal Abdul Rauf (B.S. 1969), imam, author, activist; sponsor and director of Park51
- Eugene H. Trinh (B.S. 1972), Vietnamese-American scientist and astronaut
- Eduardo M. Ochoa (M.S. 1976), President of California State University, Monterey Bay
- Kevin P. Chilton (M.S. 1977), engineer, the current commander, U.S. Strategic Command, former NASA astronaut
- Rocco B. Commisso (B.S. 1971), Italian-American billionaire, founder and CEO of Mediacom, the 8th largest cable television company in the United States
- James L. Manley (B.S. 1971), professor of life sciences at Columbia University
- Alvin E. Roth (B.S. 1971), economist, 2012 Nobel Prize Laureate in Economics
- David Marquardt (B.S. 1973), venture capitalist and founder of August Capital
- James Albaugh (M.S. 1974), Current president and CEO of Boeing Commercial Airplanes, EVP of its parent company, The Boeing Company.
- Vikram Pandit (B.S. 1976), former CEO of Citigroup
- Ralph Izzo (B.S. 1978, M.S. 1979, Ph.D. 1981), chairman, president, and CEO of Public Service Enterprise Group
- James R. Scapa (B.S. 1978), Greek American billionaire, Chairman and CEO of Altair Engineering
- Ken Bowersox (M.S. 1979), engineer, United States Naval officer and a former NASA astronaut
- William G. Gregory (M.S. 1980), NASA astronaut
- Len Blavatnik (M.S. 1981), billionaire, founder of Access Industries
- Peter Livanos (B.S. 1981), Greek shipping tycoon, billionaire, owner of Ceres Hellenic Shipping Enterprises and Chairman of Euronav; former major shareholder of Aston Martin
- Anrika Rupp (B.S. 1981), artist
- Joshua Bloch (B.S. 1982), software engineer, chief Java architect at Google
- Jay Mehta (B.S. 1983), Indian businessman, owner of the conglomerate Mehta Group and Indian cricket team Kolkata Knight Riders; husband of Indian actress Juhi Chawla
- Vincent Sapienza (B.S. 1982), commissioner of the New York City Department of Environmental Protection
- Ted Rall (dropped out 1984), Political cartoonist, president of the Association of American Editorial Cartoonists
- Wayne Goodman (B.S. 1984), psychiatrist who developed the Yale–Brown Obsessive Compulsive Scale, chair of psychiatry at Baylor College of Medicine
- Michael Massimino (B.S. 1984), current engineer and astronaut—mission specialist, STS-109, STS-125
- Gregory H. Johnson (M.S. 1985), current colonel, engineer, astronaut for International Space Station. STS-109, support for STS-125.
- Amr Aly (B.S. 1985), winner of the 1985 Hermann Trophy and Olympic soccer player
- Robert Bakish (B.S. 1985), current president and CEO of Viacom
- Marshall Nicholson (B.S. 1985), managing director at China International Capital Corp
- Chuck Hoberman (M.S. 1985), inventor and architect; designer of the Hoberman sphere
- Douglas Leone (M.S. 1986), billionaire venture capitalist and partner at Sequoia Capital
- Jon Normile (B.S. 1988), American Olympic fencer
- Angeliki Frangou (M.S. 1988), Greek businesswoman, chairman and CEO of Navios Maritime Holdings
- Jelena Kovacevic (M.S. 1988, PhD 1991), first female dean of the New York University Tandon School of Engineering
- Moti Yung (PhD. 1988), cryptographer; information security and privacy scientist Google
- Alan E. Willner (PhD. 1988), professor of electrical engineering at the University of Southern California, president of The Optical Society
- Semyon Dukach (B.S. 1989), former chairman of SMTP and managing director of Techstars
- David Eppstein (PhD. 1989), developer of computational geometry, graph algorithms, and recreational mathematics
- Ursula Burns (M.S. 1991), Current CEO of Xerox Corporation, the first woman African-American Fortune 500 company CEO; Xerox is also the largest company a woman African American CEO is running.
- Peter DiMaggio (B.S. 1992), co-CEO of Thornton Tomasetti
- Azmi Mikati (B.S. 1994), CEO of M1 Group; nephew of Lebanese prime minister and billionaire Najib Mikati
- Neil Daswani (B.S. 1996), founder of Dasient
- Feryal Özel (B.S. 1996), professor of astronomy at the University of Arizona
- Judy Joo (B.S. 1997), American chef and TV personality, starred in the show Iron Chef UK;
- David Yeung (B.S. 1998), Hong Kong entrepreneur; founder of Green Monday
- Jon Oringer (M.S. 1999), billionaire founder and CEO of Shutterstock
- Andy Ross (B.S. 2001), Ok Go band member: guitarist, keyboard, backup vocals
- Regina Barzilay (PhD. 2003), professor at Massachusetts Institute of Technology and MacArthur Fellowship recipient in 2017
- Jennifer Yu Cheng (B.S. 2003), Hong Kong businesswoman, educator, and philanthropist, wife of New World Development CEO Adrian Cheng
- Nullsleep (B.S. 2003), 8-bit musician and founder of the 8bitpeoples collective.
- Miloš Tomić (B.S. 2005), Olympic rower representing Serbia and Montenegro
- Samantha John (B.S. 2009), American computer engineer, founder of Hopscotch
- Chris Chyung (B.S. 2016), real-estate businessman, member of the Indiana House of Representatives
- Mortimer Rogoff (M.S.E.E. 1948), first to patent an Electronic navigational chart and standardized the industry
- Alva T. Matthews (Eng.Sc.D. 1965) research engineer in shock analysis at Weidlinger

== Affiliates of the school ==
- Horst Ludwig Störmer I.I. Rabi, professor of physics and applied physics, winner of 1998 Nobel Prize in Physics
- Mihajlo Idvorski Pupin, professor, Serbian physicist and physical chemist whose inventions include the Pupin coil
- Theodore Zoli, adjunct professor of civil engineering and structural engineer
- Charles F. Chandler, American chemist, first Dean of Columbia University's School of Mines
- Xi Chen, associate professor of computer science, winner of the 2021 Gödel Prize and Fulkerson Prize
- Harold Clayton Urey, professor, Nobel Laureate (1934), extensive development in the Manhattan Project, discoverer of deuterium.
- Dimitris Anastassiou, professor of electrical engineering, developer of MPEG-2 technology
- Thomas Egleston, founder of Columbia School of Mines and professor of mining and metallurgy
- John B. Medaris, commanding general of U.S. Army Ordnance Missile Command (ABMA), planned Invasion of Normandy; professor
- Isidor Isaac Rabi, professor, PhD from Columbia (1927), Nobel Laureate, discoverer of Nuclear Magnetic Resonance
- Mario Salvadori, architect, structural engineer, professor (1940s–1990s), consultant on Manhattan Project, inventor of thin concrete shells
- Klaus Lackner, professor of environmental engineering
- Chien-Shiung Wu "Chinese Marie Curie", first lady of physics, and professor (1944–1980) who disproved "conservation of parity"
- Cyril M. Harris, professor of electrical engineering and architect
- Norman Foster Ramsey Jr., discoverer of deuteron electric quadrupole moment, molecular beam spectroscopy. Professor (1940–1947), B.A. PhD Columbia.
- Frank Press, geophysicist, work in seismic activity and wave theory, counsel to four presidents. M.A., PhD Columbia, and researcher.
- Leon M. Lederman, Nobel Laureate, discoverer of muon neutrino '62, bottom quark '77. Professor (1951–1989). M.A., PhD Columbia
- Eric Kandel, biophysicist, Nobel Laureate, uncovered secrets of synapses. Professor Physicians & Surgeons (1974–); research with the Biomedical Engineering department.
- Joseph F. Traub, founding chairman of the computer science department at Columbia
- Emanuel Derman, professor and director of Columbia's financial engineering program, co-authors of the Financial Modelers' Manifesto
- Alfred Aho, Canadian computer scientist widely known for his co-authorship of the AWK programming language, winner of the 2020 Turing Award
- Gertrude Fanny Neumark, one of the world's leading experts on doping wide-band semiconductors
- Charles Hard Townes, professor and an American Nobel Prize-winning physicist who helped to invent the laser
- Jacob Millman, professor of electrical engineering, creator of Millman's Theorem
- John R. Dunning, school dean, physicist who played key roles in the development of the atomic bomb
- Steven M. Bellovin, professor of computer science
- Philip Kim, professor of applied physics and mathematics
- Mihalis Yannakakis, professor of computer science, famous scholar noted for his work in the fields of Computational complexity theory, Databases
- Maria Chudnovsky, professor of operations research and industrial engineering
- David E Keyes, professor of applied mathematics
- Awi Federgruen, Affiliate Professor of Operations Research and Industrial Engineering
- Nicholas F. Maxemchuk, professor of electrical engineering
- Clifford Stein, professor of operations research and industrial engineering
- Ronald Breslow, professor of chemical engineering, now University Professor
- Santiago Calatrava (Honorary Doctorate, 2007), world renowned architect, sculptor and structural engineer, designer of Montjuic Communications Tower and World Trade Center Transportation Hub
- Ferdinand Freudenstein, Higgins Professor Emeritus of Mechanical Engineering
- Henry Spotnitz, affiliate professor of biomedical engineering
- Thomas Christian Kavanagh, professor of civil engineering
- Vladimir Vapnik, professor of computer science and co-developer of Vapnik–Chervonenkis theory
- Jaron Lanier, visiting scholar at the Computer Science department
- Sheldon Weinig, professor of operations research and industrial engineering and founder of Materials Research Corporation
- Chris Wiggins, professor of applied mathematics, chief data scientist of The New York Times
- Man-Chung Tang, professor of civil engineering and former chairman of American Society of Civil Engineers
- Van C. Mow, professor of biomedical engineering and member of the National Academy of Engineering, Institute of Medicine
- Matt Berg, member of Mechanical Engineering Department research group and one of Time 100 Most Influential People in the World
- Martin I. Reiman, professor of Industrial Engineering an Operations Research, winner of the John von Neumann Theory Prize in 2016
- Bjarne Stroustrup, professor in Computer Science, inventor of C++ programming language
- Shree K. Nayar, professor of Computer Science, inventor of 360° camera and developer of Oren–Nayar Reflectance Model
- David E. Shaw, former professor of computer science, founder of hedge fund, private equity and technology development firm D. E. Shaw & Co.
- Mary Cunningham Boyce, former dean of the school, provost of Columbia University

== Other programs ==
- Undergraduate Research Involvement Program
  - Each SEAS department sponsors opportunities to do novel undergraduate research which have applications in the real world. Departmental Chairs supervise students through the process, and mentoring with a professor is provided.
- Materials science and engineering
  - Program in the Department of Applied Physics and Applied Mathematics, sharing teaching and research with the faculty from Henry Krumb School of Mines.
- Computer engineering
  - Administered by both the electrical engineering and computer science departments through a joint computer engineering committee.
- The combined plan program
  - The 3–2, B.A./B.S., is designed to provide students with the opportunity to receive both a B.A. degree from an affiliated liberal arts college and a B.S. degree from SEAS within five years. Students complete the requirements for the liberal arts degree along with a pre-engineering course of study in three years at their college and then complete two years at Columbia.

== See also ==
- List of Columbia University people
- Education in New York City
- Columbia University
