= Mallmann's Peak =

Mountain in Minnesota, United States

Coordinates: 48.0810°N 91.1379°W

Mallmann's Peak is one of the lesser peaks of the Sawtooth Mountains of northeastern Minnesota, with a height of 230 feet above Kekequabic Lake, on whose northeastern shore the mountain sits. The mountain was named for John Mallmann, an employee of the Minnesota Geological Survey at the end of the 19th century.
