= Chia-Kun Chu =

Chinese-American mathematician (1927–2023)

Chia-Kun (John) Chu
- Born: August 14, 1927; Shanghai, China
- Died: January 2, 2023 (aged 95); Basking Ridge, New Jersey, U.S.
- Education: Chiao-Tung University; Cornell University; New York University
- Known for: Computational fluid dynamics
- Relatives: Fu Zaiyuan (brother-in-law)
- Scientific career
- Fields: Applied Mathematics
- Workplaces: General Electric Company; Stevens Institute of Technology; Pratt Institute; New York University; Columbia University
- Doctoral advisor: Kurt Otto Friedrichs

Chia-Kun (John) Chu (Chinese: 朱家琨; pinyin: Zhū Jiākūn; August 14, 1927 – January 2, 2023) was a Chinese-American applied mathematician who was the Fu Foundation Professor Emeritus of Applied Mathematics at Columbia University. He had been on Columbia faculty since 1965 and served as the department chairman of applied physics and nuclear engineering three times (1982–1983, 1985–1988, 1995–1997).

== Biography ==
Chu received a bachelor's in mechanical engineering from Chiao-Tung University in 1948, a master's from Cornell University in 1950, and a Ph.D. from Courant Institute, New York University in 1959.

Chu was an internationally recognized applied mathematician and one of the pioneers of computational mathematics in fluid dynamics, magnetohydrodynamics, and shock waves. He developed approximations to the differential equations of fluid dynamics and coined the term "computational fluid dynamics".

Chu received numerous honors. He was a recipient of Guggenheim Fellowship and was elected fellow of American Physical Society and fellow of Japan Society for the Promotion of Science. He was awarded an honorary Doctor of Science degree from Columbia University in 2006.

Chia-Kun Chu was the son of bank chairman Ju Tang Chu. Chia-Kun Chu was also the brother-in-law of Fu Zaiyuan, a Columbia donor who gave his name for the Fu Foundation School of Engineering and Applied Science.

Chia-Kun Chu died on January 2, 2023, at the age of 95.

== See also ==
- Chinese people in New York City
