= Edmund Prentis =

American engineer and art collector

Edmund Astley Prentis, Jr. (1883 – March 12, 1967) was an American engineer and art collector. He was a former president of the American Standards Association.

== Biography ==
Prentis was born in New York City in 1883. His father, Edmund Astley Prentis, Sr. emigrated from England and worked as textile designer and importer. He graduated from Columbia School of Mines in 1906 as president of his class. After college, he worked in mines in Peru, Mexico, Arizona, and North Carolina before enlisting in the United States Navy during World War I.

He co-founded the engineering firm Spencer, White & Prentis with his Columbia classmates Lazarus White and Charles B. Spencer. The company became one of the leading foundation and marine engineering and construction companies, and Prentis was involved in the construction of a new foundation for the White House, the New York City Subway, a water tunnel under the Hudson River, as well as several Naval drydocks.

Prentis was a former president of the American Standards Association and a member of Tau Beta Pi. He also sat on the board of the New-York Historical Society and was a trustee of Columbia University, which awarded him with an honorary doctorate of science in 1956. He was also a recipient of the Alexander Hamilton Medal and the Thomas Egleston Medal for his contributions to his alma mater and achievements in engineering, respectively.

Prentis was involved in the recreation of historic rooms for the New Hampshire Historical Society, the New-York Historical Society, the Shelburne Museum in Vermont, and Columbia University. He was an art collector and his collections were featured at the Metropolitan Museum of Art and the New Hampshire Historical Society. He was also a noted collector of Columbiana, historical items related to Columbia University. His sister, Katherine Prentis Murphy, was also an art collector known for her collection of antiques. The Prentis House at the Shelburne Museum was named after the family. He was also the namesake of Columbia's Prentis Hall.

== Personal life and family ==
Prentis died on March 12, 1967, at age 83. He was survived by his wife, son, and four grandchildren.

His son, Edmund Astley Prentis III, was a principal in the family firm and a champion croquet player. His grandson, Edmund Astley Prentis IV, was also a croquet player and was the world's full-time croquet professional. Both of them were named to the Croquet Hall of Fame.
