= Spinrad =

Spinrad is a surname. Notable people with the surname include:

- Hyron Spinrad (1934–2015), American astronomer
- Norman Spinrad (born 1940), American science fiction writer, essayist, and critic
- Rick Spinrad, American oceanographer and government official
- Robert Spinrad (1932–2009), American computer pioneer
