= Wiederhorn =

Wiederhorn is a surname. Notable people with the surname include:

- Andrew Wiederhorn (born 1966), American businessman from Oregon
- Ken Wiederhorn (born 1945), American news and documentary editor
- Sheldon M. Wiederhorn (1933–2021), American materials scientist
