= Jasper Peak =

Mountain in Minnesota, United States

- Location within Minnesota

Highest point
- Elevation: 1,707 ft (520 m) NAVD 88
- Coordinates: 47°48′50″N 92°12′56″W

Geography
- Location: Saint Louis County, Minnesota
- Topo map: USGS Soudan

Jasper Peak is a peak in northeastern Minnesota near Soudan. It derives its current name from the red jasper which is the major constituent of the mountain's bedrock. A Minnesota Division of Forestry lookout tower built in 1934 is situated on the summit.

The mountain was once named Chester Peak in honor of Albert Huntington Chester, a graduate of the Columbia School of Mines and a professor of chemistry, mineralogy, and metallurgy at Hamilton College 1870–1891, and later at Rutgers College. His survey of the Mesabi and Vermilion Iron Ranges was published in the Eleventh Annual Report of the Minnesota Geological Survey in 1882.
