= Henry Krumb =

American mining engineer (1875–1958)

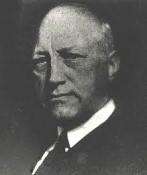
Henry Krumb

Henry Krumb (15 November 1875 – 27 December 1958) was an American mining engineer. As a Guggenheim engineer, he was the first to apply scientific methods to sampling bulk-tonnage orebodies at the enormous porphyry copper deposit at Bingham Canyon, Utah.

Krumb further refined his churn drill sampling technique at William Boyce Thompson's Inspiration (Miami, Arizona) mine. He also developed the nearby Magma Mine at Superior, Arizona for Thompson. Thompson then built a winter home and gardens nearby, now open to the public as the Boyce Thompson Arboretum, the oldest public botanical garden in the Western US.

== Biography ==
Krumb was born in Brooklyn, New York City on 15 November 1875 and graduated from Boys High School in 1894. He then attended the Columbia School of Mines, graduating with a E.M. degree in 1898.

After graduation, Krumb worked in New York before moving west to work as a mine superintendent from 1899 to 1902. From 1902 to 1907, he worked as an engineer under the guidance of John Hays Hammond. Krumb then moved to Salt Lake City, Utah, where he became a consulting engineer.

During World War I, Krumb was a member of the priorities committee of the War Industries Board. He later moved to 730 Park Avenue in Manhattan and established a consulting office on Wall Street.

In 1939, Krumb was awarded the Egleston Medal by Columbia University for distinguished engineering achievement. In 1951, he received an honorary Doctor of Science degree from Columbia University.

Krumb died at the Columbia-Presbyterian Medical Center on 27 December 1958. He was interred at Woodlawn Cemetery in The Bronx three days later.

== Legacy ==
The Henry Krumb School of Mines at Columbia University, which encompassed the Department of Earth and Environmental Engineering along with the program in Materials Science and the Earth Engineering Center, is named in his honor in 1964. However, in 1998, Columbia did away with its mining program and the Krumb chair in mining has been vacant for at least two decades, as of 2013.

The lecture series at Society for Mining, Metallurgy, and Exploration is also named in his honor.
