= Albert Huntington Chester =

American geologist and mining engineer

Professor Albert Huntington Chester (November 22, 1843 – April 13, 1903) was an American geologist and mining engineer.

== Personal life ==
Chester was the son of Albert Tracey and Elizabeth (Stanley) Chester of Connecticut. He was married to Alethea S. Rudd of New York City from 1869 until her death in 1891. He was then married to Georgiana Waldron Jenks of Buffalo, New York from 1898 until his own death. He was the father of one child, Albert Huntington Chester, Jr.

== Accomplishments ==
Chester was a graduate of the Columbia School of Mines with an M.E. (1868) and a Ph.D. (1876). Professionally, he was a mining engineer and a professor of chemistry, mineralogy, and metallurgy for Hamilton College and Rutgers College. He completed an exploration of the Mesabi and Vermilion Iron Ranges for the Minnesota Iron Company in 1875, and his observations were published in the Eleventh Annual Report of the Minnesota Geological Survey in 1882.

== Published ==
- The Iron Region of Northern Minnesota" in Annual Report of the Minnesota Geological Survey, No. 11 (1884), 154-167
- A Catalogue of Minerals Alphabetically Arranged, With Their Chemical Compositions and Synonyms (New York,1897)
- A Dictionary of the Names of Minerals, (New York, 1896).

== Honors ==
Chester Peak, a mountain in the Sawtooth Range of northeastern Minnesota, was named in his honor.
