= Arthur Hauspurg =

American businessman

Arthur Hauspurg (August 27, 1925 – February 19, 2003) was an American businessman who was the chairman of Consolidated Edison.

== Biography ==
Hauspurg was born in Brooklyn and graduated from Brooklyn Technical High School. He received his B.S. from Columbia University School of Engineering in 1943 before serving in the Navy from 1943 to 1946. He returned to Columbia and received a M.S. in electrical engineering in 1947. Hauspurg was a member of the Tau Beta Pi honor society.

As chief engineer of the American Electric Power Corporation, he was named to the federal commission investigating the Northeast blackout of 1965. In 1969, he joined ConEdison as vice president for system planning and electrical engineering and he was responsible for research and development.

In 1973, he rose to senior vice president and became president and COO of ConEdison in 1975. In 1981, he became CEO and chairman in 1982. He retired from both positions in 1990 and was replaced by Eugene R. McGrath. He was credited for improving the company's transmission system and updating its control center.

Hauspurg served on the boards of New York City Partnership and the Central Park Conservancy. He was elected a member of the National Academy of Engineering in 1976, for "[c]ontributions and research in UHV and HVDC transmission and in the field of complex interconnected power systems reliability." In 1979, he received the Thomas Egleston Medal from the Columbia University School of Engineering for distinguished achievement in engineering or applied science.

He died on February 19, 2003, at a family reunion in Barbados at 77 years old.
