= Fu Zaiyuan =

Chinese entrepreneur and philanthropist (1919–2011)

- 傅在源
- Born: July 5, 1919; Shanghai, China
- Died: August 26, 2011 (aged 91–92); Hong Kong
- Other name: Z.Y. Fu
- Education: St. John's University; Waseda University
- Occupations: entrepreneur philanthropist
- Title: founder of Sansaio Trading Corporation
- Spouse: Joan Yun Chung Chu Fu

Fu Zaiyuan (Chinese: 傅在源; pinyin: Fù Zàiyuán; abbreviated as Z.Y. Fu; July 5, 1919 – August 26, 2011) was a Chinese entrepreneur and philanthropist who founded the Sansaio Trading Corporation of Japan. The Fu Foundation School of Engineering and Applied Science of Columbia University in New York City was named after him in 1997, in recognition of his US$26 million donation.

== Biography ==
Born and raised in Shanghai, Fu Zaiyuan belonged to a family of 13 children. After graduating from St. John's University in Shanghai, he went to Waseda University in Japan.

In 1951, Fu founded the Sansaio Trading Corporation in Tokyo. In 1990, he set up the Fu Foundation to offer scholarships for Chinese students studying at Columbia University. He died in Hong Kong on August 26, 2011. His wife Joan Yun Chung Chu Fu (朱蘊瓊) was born in 1932 and died in 2017.

Fu's estate is the subject of the Hong Kong civil litigation case Shochiro Satake v. Fu Chu, Yun Chung Joan with his wife being the Administratrix of the Estate of Fu Dze Yuen, deceased and in her personal capacity. Through marriage, he was also an in-law of Jerrold Meinwald (1927–2018), an American chemist known for co-founding the field of chemical ecology.

== Columbia University ==
Fu Zaiyuan enrolled in the Columbia University School of General Studies to improve his English. The Columbia School of Engineering and Applied Science renamed to the "Fu Foundation School of Engineering and Applied Science" after Fu donated US$26 million to the institution in 1997 ($41.7 million in 2019).

Fu and his wife endowed The Fu Foundation Chair in applied mathematics, held by Professor Chia-Kun Chu. Additionally, in 1993, the Fu Foundation established a scholarship program that supported 62 students from China who graduated between 1995 and 2007, with the awards divided between Columbia Engineering and Columbia College. In 2012, several recipients of the Fu scholarships in return established the Fu Memorial Scholarship Fund, which supports five students from Columbia Engineering and Columbia College.

Fu's brother-in-law, Prof. Chia-Kun Chu, noted that Fu began giving to Columbia in 1989, when at age 70, he endowed a chair at the engineering school because he "wanted to do a good thing."

== See also ==
- Chinese people in New York City
