= Henry Ludwig Michel =

Henry L. Michel
- Born: 1925; Frankfurt, Germany
- Died: May 23, 2001 (aged 75–76); Manhattan, New York, U.S.
- Education: Columbia University
- Employer: Formerly Parsons Brinckerhoff
- Title: Former chairman and CEO of Parsons Brinckerhoff

Henry Ludwig Michel (1925-2001) was a civil engineer and chairman of Parsons Brinckerhoff. He was responsible for the planning and management of public infrastructure projects, having received international acclaim for his management of worldwide transportation projects. In 2000, Michel was honored with the Pupin Medal conferred by Columbia University in memory of Michael Pupin.

== Early life and career ==
Henry Michel was born in Frankfurt, Germany in 1925. In 1949, Michel earned a B.A. in civil engineering from Columbia University. After graduation, he participated in a project that sought to upgrade British fighter bomber bases in the Cold War era.

Michel later left England, moving to Rome where he started an engineering company that became a contractor at sites in Iran, Iraq, Kenya, Nigeria, Saudi Arabia and Tunisia. He helped to develop the University of Baghdad, the Nigerian Parliament in Lagos, Tunis University and the World Health Organization headquarters in Geneva.

== Parsons Brinckerhoff ==
Michel, upon returning to New York City in 1965, joined the engineering planning and construction company Parsons Brinckerhoff. He became the company's partner in 1969 and in 1975 reorganized the traditional partnership into an employee-owned corporation. He became the first chief executive and chairman of the newly formed corporation in 1990.

During his tenure, the engineering firm went international, setting up six offices overseas. Employment grew drastically from 500 to 4,000 employees. Under Michel's leadership, Parsons Brinckerhoff became one of the most reputed consulting engineering firms in the United States. The company would later be contracted to manage Boston's mega transportation project known as the Big Dig.

== Later life ==
After stepping down as chairman in 1994, Michel continued to speak on the company's behalf. He then joined a new trouble-shooting venture, Global Construction Solutions, in Princeton, New Jersey, while also becoming a co-owner of Pegasus Consulting.

Mr. Michel was a founding member and former president of the Civil Engineering Research Foundation (CERF). In his mid and late career, Michel traveled extensively lecturing universities including MIT and Columbia. He is the recipient of many awards such as Columbia's Pupin and Egleston Medal. In 1995, Michel was elected into the prestigious National Academy of Engineering.

The American Society of Civil Engineers named its Henry L. Michel Award for Industry Advancement of Research, presented at the annual CERF Global Innovation Awards Dinner, in honor of Henry Michel.

He died on May 23, 2001 at his home on the East Side of Manhattan.

== See also ==
- Columbia University
- Columbia Engineering
- Big Dig
- Parsons Brinckerhoff
- Ivy League
- Mihajlo Idvorski Pupin
