= Anrika Rupp =

Venezuelan artist, photographer (born 1956)

Anrika Rupp (born 1956) is a visual artist and photographer who lives and works in Caracas, Venezuela, and Miami, Florida. Her work has received international attention, including solo and group exhibits in various art galleries, art museums, and art fairs. She has had two solo exhibits in Caracas: one at the Elvira Neri Alternativa Art Gallery in 2004, and another at the Galería 39 in 2007. In 2014, she had a solo exhibit at All We Art, an art gallery in Washington, D.C. that promotes international cultural exchange. She has also participated in group exhibitions such as the 2005 Megaexposición II: Venezuelan Art of the XXI Century in honor of Jesus Soto which was held in Caracas, the O'Ascanio Gallery "Summer Collectables 2013", and the 2016 Art Basel in Miami.

== Early life ==
Rupp was born in New York City. She attended the Parsons School of Design, where in 1977 she earned a Bachelor of Fine Arts degree. In 1981 she earned a Bachelor of Science degree from the Columbia University School of Engineering. Her education and training qualify her as both an artist and engineer.

In the 1970s, development of UNIX operating systems, later released as C source code, marked a milestone in the evolution of computer systems. During that time Rupp was studying computer programming at the Central University of Venezuela, where she designed systems for some of the first computers. In the early 1990s, she received an editorial commission at the Institute of Engineering which involved working with a 200-page book titled, "Image of Venezuela, A View from Space", published by Petróleos de Venezuela, S.A. (PDVSA), 1997. She was also involved in commercial graphic design, photography, satellite digital image processing, and digital communications protocol. It was not until later that she developed an interest in cosmic matter and phenomena which eventually led to her focus on the formation of galaxies, much of which reflects in her three-dimensional artwork.

== Art ==
One of Rupp's notable works is titled "Galaxy in a Box #12 – Fusion Within, Fission Without". The work gives the illusion that there is a brightly colored, complex sphere inside a transparent cube; however, the reality is a sequence of paintings on plastic squares which are geometrically aligned to create the illusion. The work was part of Rupp's PH Random Access exhibit in 2014 at the All We Art gallery in Washington, D.C. The PH symbolizes photography, philosophy, photons and PHAs (potentially hazardous asteroids) which comprise the thought-provoking pieces in Rupp's exhibit.
