= Louis Pope Gratacap =

American scientist and writer (1851–1917)

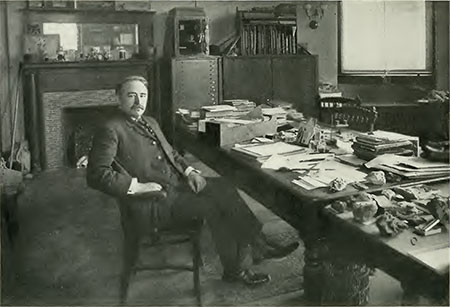
- Gratacap at his desk in the American Museum of Natural History
- Born: Louis Pope Gratacap; 1 November 1851; Brooklyn, New York
- Died: 19 December 1917 (aged 66); Staten Island, New York
- Resting place: Trinity Churchyard, Manhattan, New York
- Education: City College of New York; Columbia School of Mines
- Occupations: Museum curator; mineralogy; paleontology

Louis Pope Gratacap (November 1, 1851 – December 19, 1917) was an American museum curator who worked at the American Museum of Natural History from 1876 until his death, in addition to publishing an extensive body of writings.

== Early life and education ==
Gratacap was born on November 1, 1851, in Gowanus, Brooklyn, to John L. Gratacap and his wife Lucinda née Benton. His family soon moved to West New Brighton, Staten Island, where he would live for the rest of his life. He attended New York public schools, then the City College of New York, from which he graduated in 1869. After a year at the General Theological Seminary, he enrolled at the Columbia School of Mines, graduating in 1876.

== Career ==
In 1876 Gratacap began to work as an assistant at the American Museum of Natural History, and in 1880 he became assistant curator of mineralology. In 1900 he was appointed curator of mineralology (also overseeing the conchology collection), and after the two collections were separated in 1909, he held the dual titles of Curator of the Department of Mineralology and Curator of Mollusca in the Department of Invertebrate Zoology. His care in the arrangement and display of the museum's mineralogical specimens was the subject of particular praise. At the time of his death, he was the longest-serving employee of the museum.

He went on several expeditions, including one to Iceland in 1906, about which he wrote the book A Trip Around Iceland. He joined the Natural Science Association of Staten Island in 1881, and served as its president in 1887 and 1888. Gratacap was also known as an outstanding lecturer.

== Writings ==
In addition to numerous articles and notes on mineralogy, paleontology, and natural history in academic journals, Gratacap published articles on scientific subjects (such as "The Ice Age") in popular science magazines, as well as a textbook on the geology of New York City and a book-length guide to minerals. A polymath, he also published works on theological, philosophical and political topics. He branched out into speculative fiction in novels dealing with the planet Mars, eugenics, climate change, a lost world, and even zombies of a sort. According to the science fiction critic John Clute, "Gratacap's range was wide, incorporating much material which has become central to sf, but his books are overlong, choked by his compulsive didacticism, and nearly unreadable today."

== Works ==
=== Geology ===
- Geology of New York City (3 editions successively expanded, 1901, 1904, 1909)
- A Popular Guide to Minerals (1912)

=== Novels ===
- The Certainty of a Future Life in Mars: Being the Posthumous Papers of Bradford Torrey Dodd (1903)
- A Woman of the Ice Age (1906)
- The Evacuation of England: The Twist in the Gulf Stream (1908)
- The Mayor of New York: A Romance of the Days to Come (1910)
- The New Northland (1915)
- The End: How the Great War Was Stopped; A Novelistic Vagary (1917)
