= Anna Kazanjian Longobardo =

American engineer (1928–2020)

Anna Kazanjian Longobardo (1928 – 7 December 2020) was the former director of the engineering firm Woodward Clyde Group and a former executive at Unisys Corp. She headed Unisys, supporting the development of military systems and weather radar systems worldwide from 1988 to 1995. She is one of the founders of the Society of Women Engineers, which elected her a fellow in 1991.

== Background and work ==
Longobardo was born in New York City in 1928. In 1949, Longobardo became the first woman to receive a B.S. in mechanical engineering from Columbia University, and in 1952, she received a master's degree from Columbia. During her undergraduate work, Longobardo became interested in analog and digital computer applications and went on to make significant contributions to the aerospace engineering field. She was one of the first women to work aboard US Navy submarines, destroyers and other vessels. She designed and evaluated submarine-towed buoys used to calibrate sonar. Her design increased navigational accuracy for submarines that operated below periscope depth.

After working as a systems engineer at American Bosch Arma Corporation, Longobardo joined Sperry Rand Corp, which became Unisys Corp. At Unisys, she directed the development of radiation-tolerant computers for the United States Air Force and managed programs for the National Highway Traffic Safety Administration. She later became the first woman executive of Unisys Corporation's defense unit. She was responsible for organizing complex military and weather radar systems in more than 100 locations across the world.

== Recognition ==
Longobardo has served on the corporate boards of Woodward Clyde and Woodward Clyde Federal Services. In 1963 Nelson Rockefeller appointed her to the New York State Women's Council. From 1966 to 1970, she was the director of the Technical Societies Council of New York and was named one of New York's 100 Women of Influence.

She maintains a close relationship with Columbia. A former trustee, she is the first woman to receive the Egleston Medal for distinguished engineering achievements. She was also Vice Chair of Columbia's Engineering Foundation Board and served as chairman of the Bronxville Design Review Committee. She is a current member of the Mechanical Engineering Advisor Board and the Barnard Science Advisory Council. She has also been president of the CESAA Board of Directors and the Columbia Society of Graduates. She was the first woman president of Columbia University's alumni federation.

Longobardo is a long-time active member of the American Society of Mechanical Engineers, the Joint Engineering Management Committee, and the American Institute of Aeronautics and Astronautics.

== See also ==
- Society of Women Engineers
- Columbia University
- Unisys
