= Materials Research Corporation =

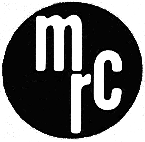

Materials Research Corporation (MRC) was a global manufacturer and supplier of highly specialized semiconductor materials and equipment.

== Timeline ==
- 1957: Materials Research Corporation founded by Dr. Sheldon Weinig and Dr. Josef Intrater at 47 Buena Vista Ave., Yonkers, NY

for the purification and characterization of materials to be used in controlled research

- 1970: IPO, listed on the American Stock Exchange. Businesses included sputtering systems, high purity materials for sputtering and evaporation thin film metal processes, ultra high purity fine grande alumina substrates for telecommunication devices.
- 1975: Introduced 902/903 Batch
- 1980: Introduced 603 Batch
- 1981: Moved company from Yonkers, New York to Route 303, Orangeburg, NY 10962
- 1988: Introduced the Eclipse
- 1989: MRC acquires CVD division in Phoenix, AZ
- 1989: Acquired by Sony Corporation of America (for $58 million)
- 1992: Garrett Pierce becomes President and CEO
- 1993: Tom Marmen becomes President and CEO
- 1996: Dr. Robert Foster becomes CEO
- 1997: Moved operations from NY to Gilbert, AZ, as part of a company reorganization

Outsourced manufacturing of the Eclipse Mark II, Eclipse Star, and Solaces PVD to Derlan, Inc.
Veeco Instruments Inc., Plainview, N.Y. acquired MRC Media & Magnetics Applications (MMA) division in Orangeburg, N.Y

- 1998: Tokyo Electron Limited (TEL) acquired the equipment divisions of MRC

KDF acquired the MRC batch and etch product lines from Tokyo Electron

- 1999: Praxair Surface Technologies, Inc., a wholly owned subsidiary of Praxair, Inc. acquired the business of Materials Research Corporation (MRC), a wholly owned subsidiary of Sony Corporation of America.
