= Neil Daswani =

American computer specialist

- Citizenship: United States
- Education: Stanford University; Columbia University
- Known for: Dasient
- Scientific career
- Fields: Computer science

Neil Daswani is a co-director of the Stanford Advanced Security Certification Program, and an expert in data security. He is the lead author of the book "Foundations of Security: What Every Programmer Needs To Know."

In 2008, he co-founded Dasient, a web security company, along with another ex-Googler and Berkeley alum Shariq Rizvi, and former McKinsey strategy consultant Ameet Ranadive. Daswani was previously a product manager at Google.

== Career ==
Daswani was born into a Sindhi family. He did B.S. in Computer Science from Columbia University in 1996 and M.S. and Ph.D. in Computer Science from Stanford University.

Prior to his roles at Google and Stanford, Daswani served in a variety of research, development, teaching, and managerial roles at Yodlee, Lucent, and Bellcore (now Telcordia Technologies). His additional areas of expertise include wireless data technology, and peer-to-peer systems. He has published extensively in these areas, frequently gives talks at industry and academic conferences, and has been granted several U.S. patents.

At Google he led the authoring of "The Anatomy of Clickbot.A", a detailed analysis of a 100,000 machine botnet constructed to conduct click fraud, and a book chapter on "Online Advertising Fraud".

While at Stanford, he was the PhD student of Hector Garcia-Molina, and he co-founded the Stanford Center for Professional Development (SCPD) Security Certification Program. He received a Ph.D. in computer science. He also holds a M.S. in computer science from Stanford University, and a B.S. in computer science with honors with distinction from Columbia University.
