= Dasient =

Internet security company headquartered in Sunnyvale, California

- Type: Subsidiary
- Industry: Internet security, web anti-malware
- Founded: 2008
- Founder: Neil Daswani; Shariq Rizvi; Ameet Ranadive
- Headquarters: Sunnyvale, California United States
- Products: Web Anti-Malware (WAM), Anti Malvertising Solution (AMS)
- Parent: Twitter
- Website: www.dasient.com

Dasient was an internet security company headquartered in Sunnyvale, California. It was founded in 2008 and launched its first product in June 2009. Dasient was acquired by Twitter in January 2012.

== Products ==
Dasient provides cloud-based anti-malware services for protecting businesses against web-based malware and malvertising.

Dasient's Web Malware Analysis Platform uses a dynamic, behavioral-based engine - based on sophisticated algorithms and anomaly detection technology - to defend against the latest attacks using up-to-date intelligence about malware. This platform includes a system of highly instrumented virtual machines to simulate what actual users would experience when visiting a particular web page or viewing a specific online ad.

== History ==
The company was founded by former Google personnel Neil Daswani and Shariq Rizvi, and former McKinsey strategy consultant Ameet Ranadive.

Dasient was named by Network World as one of ten startups to watch in 2010.

The company received seed funding from Mike Maples, former Verisign CEO Stratton Sclavos, and former 3Com/Palm chairman Eric Benhamou. In February 2011, it was announced that Google Ventures invested in Dasient.

Dasient was acquired by Twitter in January 2012 for $19.1 million.
