= Angeliki Frangou =

Greek shipowner (born 1965)

- Angeliki Frangou
- Born: 1965 (age 60–61); Chios, Greece
- Education: Fairleigh Dickinson University; Columbia University
- Occupation: Shipping
- Board member of: Owner of Navios Maritime Holdings
- Parent: Nikolas Frangos

Angeliki Frangou (Ancient Greek: Αγγελική Φράγκου; born 1965) is a Greek shipowner, chairwoman, chief executive officer and Director of Navios Maritime Holdings., of Navios Maritime Partners L.P., of Navios Tankers Management Inc. and Navios Maritime Acquisition Corporation.

== Early life and education ==
Frangou was born in 1965, in Chios, to a family of shipowners from the village of Kardamyla. Her father is the shipowner Nikolaos (Nikolas) Frangos. She has a brother Ioannis (John), and two younger sisters (Katerina) and (Maria). Her brother is also a shipowner with his own company and both them are the fourth generation of shipowners in the family.

Frangou obtained a bachelor's degree in mechanical engineering from Fairleigh Dickinson University and a master's degree in mechanical engineering from Columbia University.

== Navios Group ==
In 2004, Frangou raised $200 million to buy Navios. Previously she was working on Wall Street as an analyst on the trading floor of Republic National Bank for a couple of years. As of December 2014, Navios Group controls 149 dry bulk carriers, 50 tankers and 12 container vessels. Between 2004 and 2014, "the Navios group has raised a shade under $10bn in financing - $6.3bn from the capital markets and 3.6bn from bank debt". Angeliki Frangou demonstrates an acute ability to grasp both the financial and shipping markets. "She is just as happy to mull over the fuel economies that can be achieved by proper sandblasting as she is to discuss the intricacies of financial tools". Asked about the role of women in top posts in shipping, she retorted that "I don't believe in gender, race, religion. I think it's what you want to make it. If you ever thought that you work in a company for any other reason than your ability, you should leave!"

By November 2026, Navios Maritime Partners, led by Frangou as chairwoman and chief executive, had 34 ships on order at a total cost of US$3.1 billion. The orders included one very large crude carrier and two product tankers that the company contracted with the Chinese shipyard Wuhu Rongsheng to build for delivery in 2029.

== Awards & mentions ==
In 2014, Frangou was listed 11th in the Lloyd's List Top 100 Most Influential People in Shipping list. In 2013, Frangou was mentioned on CNN's International Leading Women. In 2011, she was named the 50th most powerful businesswoman in Fortune Magazine. Also, she was named as Connecticut Maritime Association's Commodore for the year 2011. In 2020, in collaboration with Vangelis Marinakis and ION S.A., they made a donation of 1.5 million euros to the General State Hospital of Nice to help fight the coronavirus. The donation included 14 new, fully equipped intensive care units.

Lloyd's List has included her in its "One Hundred Most Influential People in the Shipping Industry" ranking her 29th in the 2025 list.

== Personal life ==
Frangou has one son named Nicolas, which was christened in Kardamyla and a daughter named Stella who was christened in Kifissia. She loves the opera and likes to collect Greek, Byzantine and Chinese artwork.
