= Donald R. Olander =

Professor of nuclear engineering

- Education: Columbia University (BA, BS); Massachusetts Institute of Technology (PhD)
- Scientific career
- Fields: Nuclear engineering
- Workplaces: University of California, Berkeley

Donald R. Olander is an emeritus professor of nuclear engineering and the James Fife Chair in Engineering at the University of California, Berkeley.

== Biography ==
Olander received his A.B. from Columbia University in 1953 and B.S. in 1954. He then received his Sc.D. from the Massachusetts Institute of Technology. He wrote his dissertation on the reprocessing of nuclear fuels using the solvent extraction method. He joined the Berkeley faculty in 1958 and moved to Berkeley's nuclear engineering department in 1961 until his retirement in 2008. His research has focused on the chemical aspects of nuclear materials.

Olander was elected a member of the National Academy of Engineering in 2000 "for research on nuclear materials including nuclear fuel element behavior in power reactors." He is a fellow of the American Nuclear Society.
