= James Kip Finch =

American engineer and educator

James Kip Finch (December 1, 1883 – April 1967) was an American engineer and educator.

== Personal life ==
James Kip Finch was born to James Wells and Winifred Florence Louise (Kip) Finch, in Peekskill, New York. He attended Columbia University, receiving a Bachelor of Science in civil engineering in 1906 and a Master of Arts in 1911. He was a member of the Episcopal Church and, in his leisure time, a keen painter with watercolors and oils. He married Lolita P. Mollmann (d. 1964) on June 25, 1910, in Stanford, New York. They had a son, Edward E. K. Finch.

== Career ==
Finch began teaching at Columbia after graduating in 1906, working as an instructor in the Summer School of Surveying, while also employed as an assistant engineer at the Tompkins Engineering Construction Co. He left Columbia for an interval beginning in 1907, during which he taught at Lafayette College, Easton, Pennsylvania before joining a succession of engineering firms in New York City: he was with an architectural firm, John B. Snook's Sons, during 1907, spent 1908 working for D. J. Ryan, a contractor in Brooklyn, and for List and Rose Contractors. In 1910 he carried out irrigation works and ranching in Montana. He then returned in 1910 to Columbia, becoming an assistant professor in 1915, associate professor in 1917, full professor in 1927, Renwick Professor in 1930, and chairman of the Department of Civil Engineering in 1932. He became associate dean at Columbia in 1941, and dean of the School of Engineering and Applied Science in 1941. He retired the deanship in 1950, but taught for another two years as Renwick Professor.

Finch devoted much of his career to the cause of engineering education and to research and teaching on the aesthetic, philosophical, and historical aspects of engineering. He was involved in the establishment of Camp Columbia, a summer engineering camp in Morris, Connecticut, under the aegis of Columbia University. The camp was sold to the State of Connecticut in 2000 is now Camp Columbia State Park/State Forest.He published numerous works, including Trends in Engineering Education (1948), Engineering and Western Civilization (1951), and The Story of Engineering (1960). He also received prominent engineering and academic awards throughout his career, notably the Columbia Alumni Medal in 1932; the gold medal of the Class of 1889 at the Commencement of 1942; the Egleston Medal of the Columbia Engineering School Alumni Association in 1944; the French Ordre des Palmes Académiques in 1949; the "Great Teacher Award" from the Columbia Society of Older Graduates in 1951; the honorary degree of Doctor of Science from Columbia University in 1954; and, in 1967, the first ASCE Civil Engineering History and Heritage Award.

Among other institutions, Finch was affiliated with the American Society for Engineering Education; the Society for Promotion of Engineering Education; the Newcomen Society of England; Tau Beta Pi; Sigma Xi; the Columbia Faculty Club; the Sanctum club, in Litchfield, CT; and the Century Association in New York. He was on November 3, 1915 elected an Associate Member of the American Society of Civil Engineers; he served as the Society's director from 1934 to 1936. Between 1934 and 1944 he also served as Director and Vice President of the society's Metropolitan Section.
