= Robert Spinrad =

Robert J. Spinrad (March 20, 1932 – September 2, 2009) was an American computer designer, who was on the staff of Brookhaven National Laboratory and who created many of the key technologies used in modern personal computers while director of the Xerox Palo Alto Research Center.

== Early life and education ==
Spinrad was born on March 20, 1932, in Manhattan. He attended the Columbia University School of Engineering for his undergraduate studies, where he was awarded a Bachelor of Science degree in electrical engineering, and was Student Council president and a Samuel Willard Bridgham Fellow. He later received a Master of Science degree at Columbia. At Columbia, he built a rudimentary computer out of remnant parts from telephone equipment. He then attended the Massachusetts Institute of Technology, where he earned his Ph.D. in the same field.

== Career ==
One of "the last of the dinosaurs" created before the widespread use of transistors, he developed a computer at Brookhaven National Laboratory called Merlin that was built using vacuum tubes. Filling up a room, the computer was designed to help run experiments. After spending a summer with at Los Alamos National Laboratory with physicist Nicholas Metropolis and his MANIAC II scientific computer, he returned to Brookhaven and designed processes to allow computers to operate scientific experiments with a feedback loop that allowed the system to modify the tests based on the results of measurements taken earlier in the test cycle. Described by physicist Joel Birnmbaum as "the father of modern laboratory automation", Spinrad wrote on the subject for a 1967 cover article of Science magazine. Birnbaum credited Spinrad with recognizing the need to put the scientist into the loop between the computer and the laboratory equipment.

Spinrad was hired by Scientific Data Systems, where he worked designing computers. When that company was bought out by Xerox in 1969, he was part of the group that led the creation of the Palo Alto Research Center (PARC) near the campus of Stanford University and was named as PARC's director in 1978. As director, Spinrad supervised the development of such products as the Ethernet computer networking technology, laser printers and what was described by The New York Times as "the first modern personal computer". As Xerox always viewed itself as primarily a photocopier company, many of PARC's top scientists — and the innovative computer technologies they had developed — left the firm.

With its research facilities and corporate offices located on opposite coasts, Spinrad would fly frequently between Xerox's corporate offices on the East Coast and the more loosely organized and operated research facility on the West Coast. Spinrad described himself as a "Superman in reverse" for his quick clothing changes into a business suit in airplane bathrooms while flying back East to visit the firm's corporate offices.

== Personal life ==
A resident of the Bronx at the time, he married the former Verna Winderman in June 1954, at which time she was doing graduate work at Columbia University.

A resident of Palo Alto, California, Spinrad died there at age 77 on September 2, 2009, due to amyotrophic lateral sclerosis (informally known as Lou Gehrig's disease). He was survived by his wife, Verna, as well as by a daughter, a son and three grandchildren.
