= Navios Maritime Holdings =

Logistics company

Navios Maritime Holdings Inc.
- Navios' Logo
- Company type: Public
- Traded as: NYSE: NM
- Industry: Shipping
- Founded: 1992; 34 years ago
- Headquarters: Piraeus, Greece
- Key people: Angeliki Frangou (Chairman & CEO)
- Revenue: US$134.19 million (2017)
- Total assets: US$2.629 billion (2017)
- Total equity: US$516.09 million (2017)
- Owner: N Logistics Holdings Corp.; (2023–present)
- Website: www.navios.com

Navios Maritime Partners, LP
- Traded as: NYSE: NMM

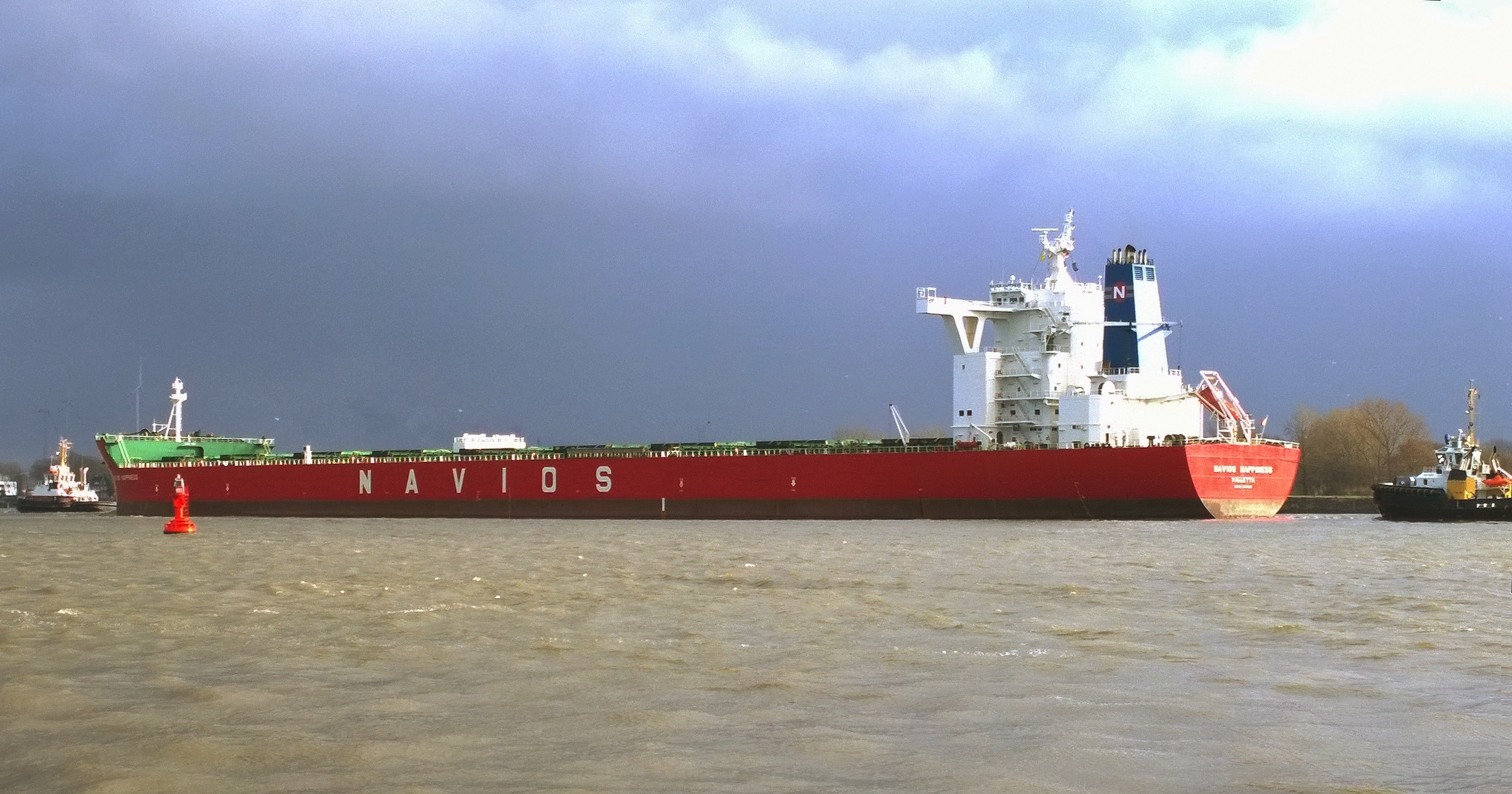
Bulk carrier Navios Happiness runs in the Port of Hamburg in March 2015

Navios Maritime Holdings Inc. (short name: Navios) is a multinational, vertically integrated seaborne shipping and logistics company focused on the transport and transshipment of drybulk commodities including iron ore, coal and grain.

On December 14, 2023, it was announced that N Logistics Holdings Corp. completed the acquisition of the company.

== Overview ==
Navios was created in 1954 by US Steel to transport iron ore to the US and Europe. Since then, it has diversified geographically and expanded the scope of its business activities such that Navios currently controls 49 vessels totaling approximately 5.1 million deadweight tons.

With several offices around the world, it is a public company listed on the New York Stock Exchange under the symbol “NYSE: NM”.

== History ==
Navios Maritime Holdings Inc. was founded in 1954 as a shipping division of US Steel. Its initial purpose was to transport iron ore to the US from various locations around the world. After the corporation's restructuring, the firm was privatized and started operating independently in the shipping market.

Over the years, it expanded its operations and established itself as a leading player in the global shipping industry. Navios Maritime maintains offices in Piraeus (Greece), New York City (United States), Montevideo (Uruguay), Antwerp (Belgium), Buenos Aires (Argentina) and Asunción (Paraguay).

As a total, Navios Group controls 99 vessels (owned and long term charted-in) and about 10.7 million deadweight tons (70 dry bulk vessels = 7.4 million dwt and 29 tanker vessels = 3.3 million dwt).

== Subsidiaries ==
The Navios Group of companies includes:

- Navios Maritime Partners, LP: listed on the NYSE under the symbol ‘NYSE: NMM’;
- Navios Maritime Acquisition Corporation: listed on the NYSE under the symbol ‘NYSE: NNA’.
- Navios South American Logistics Inc.: consists of a transshipment port/storage facility in Uruguay, an upriver port facility in Paraguay and a well-established barge and cabotage business for wet and dry products.
