= Sheldon Weinig =

American businessman (1928–2026)

Sheldon Weinig (January 15, 1928 – March 7, 2026) was an American businessman. In 1957, he founded Materials Research Corporation (MRC), a global public Company that manufactured the specialized semiconductor materials and equipment for making Electronic chips.

== Life and career ==
Sheldon Weinig was born in Brooklyn, New York City, on January 15, 1928. He studied at Columbia University, where he received his Masters and doctorate. During his studies he also was an instructor at the University. From 1955 to 1957 he was a Professor at New York University. In 1957, he founded Materials Research Corporation (MRC), which became a global public Company in 1970 that manufactured the specialized semiconductor materials and equipment for making Electronic chips.

Weinig attended Stuyvesant High School from 1943 to 1945, a magnet school in New York. After completing high school, he enlisted in the United States Army and received his education on the GI Bill. During the beginning years of MRC he taught at Cooper Union's night school. What he called a "paying the rent job."

MRC introduced leading-edge manufacturing equipment to the semiconductor industry. The company specialized in producing extremely pure metals and ceramics and the metalization and etching process equipment needed to create semiconductors.The company, under his leadership, became one of the first in its industry to open a factory in Japan to service the Japanese semiconductor industry. He was also innovative in employee benefits. He had a no-LAYOFF policy which the company held for 25 years. It was forced to give it up the same year IBM gave up the program. For educating his employees he introduced the "YOU PASS I PAY" policy.

In 1989, MRC was acquired by Sony. The U.S. government objected to the sale but the company needed a large infusion of capital and no American-owned company was prepared to make the investment to purchase it and keep it (and its technology) intact. Weinig remained with Sony for nearly seven years as vice chairman for engineering and manufacturing of Sony America. He retired from Sony in 1995 and became an adjunct professor at Columbia University and SUNY at Stony Brook where he taught a bridge course between academia and the industrial world. His students called it an MBA in one term.

In 2018 Weinig published a book entitled Rule Breaker - An Entrepreneur's Manifesto. He received a number of awards - some are listed below.

Weinig died on March 7, 2026, at the age of 98.

== Awards ==
1980: Awarded the SEMi Award, by the Semiconductor Equipment and Materials Institute.

1984: Inducted into the National Academy of Engineering for "the development of high purity, highly characterized materials, and technological processing equipment for electronic and metallurgical applications."

1988: Awarded the rank of Chevalier dans l’Ordre National de la Legion d’Honneur by the Government of France.

1990: Elected to the International Technology Institute’s Hall of Fame for Engineering, Science and Technology.

He also received three honorary doctorates from St. Thomas Aquinas University (law), Adelphi University (science) and the State university of New York at Stony Brook (science).
