= Sheldon M. Wiederhorn =

American materials scientist (1933–2021)

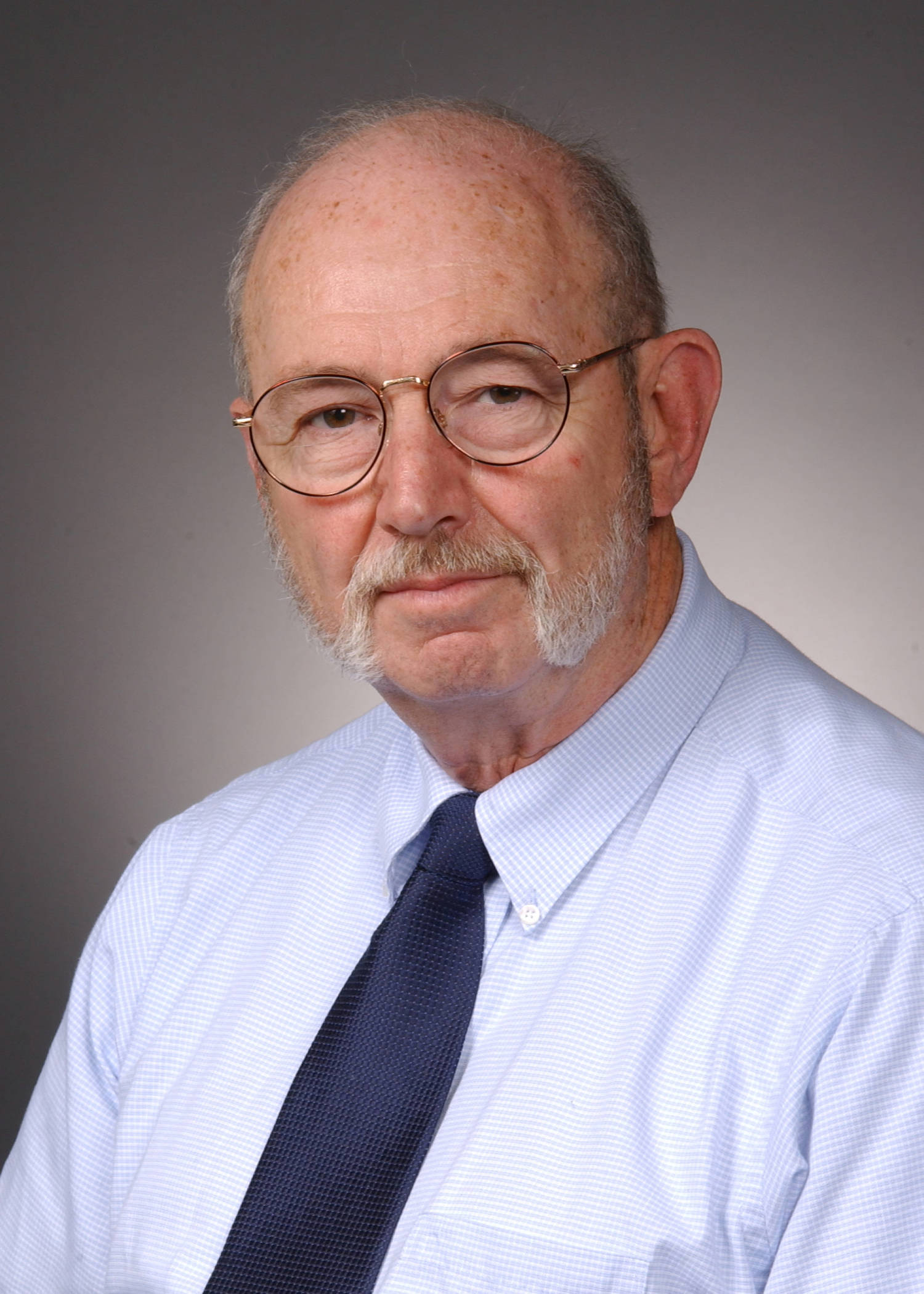
- Born: May 4, 1933
- Died: June 3, 2021 (aged 88)
- Citizenship: United States
- Education: Columbia University; University of Illinois Urbana-Champaign
- Awards: Samuel Wesley Stratton Award (1977)
- Scientific career
- Fields: Ceramics
- Workplaces: National Institute of Standards and Technology

Sheldon M. Wiederhorn (May 4, 1933 – June 3, 2021) was an American materials scientist affiliated with the National Institute of Standards and Technology.

== Biography ==
Wiederhorn was born on May 4, 1933, in The Bronx, the son of immigrants. He received his B.S. in chemical engineering from Columbia University in 1956 and was a member of the men's swim team. He then received his M.S. and Ph.D. from the University of Illinois Urbana-Champaign.

Wiederhorn's first job after university was at E.I. Du Pont de Nemours & Co., where he did research on the mechanical behavior of ceramic materials. He then joined the National Bureau of Standards to lead research on the mechanical behavior of glasses and ceramic materials and stayed at the institute for the rest of his working and emeritus career. He was known for his research applying fracture mechanics to ceramic materials and experiments he designed to characterize subcritical crack growth in glasses and how water influences crack propagation.

For his research, Wiederhorn received a Samuel Wesley Stratton Award in 1977 by the National Bureau of Standards. He was also elected a member of The American Ceramic Society (ACerS) in 1970 and was made a Distinguished Life Member in 1998. He was editor of the Journal of the American Ceramic Society for 15 years and served on the board of directors of ACerS from 2005 to 2008.

Wiederhorn was elected to the National Academy of Engineering in 1991 for "outstanding advancements in the development and application of test methods and basic understanding of the mechanical properties of ceramics."

Wiederhorn died on June 3, 2021, at age 88.
