= Thomas Egleston =

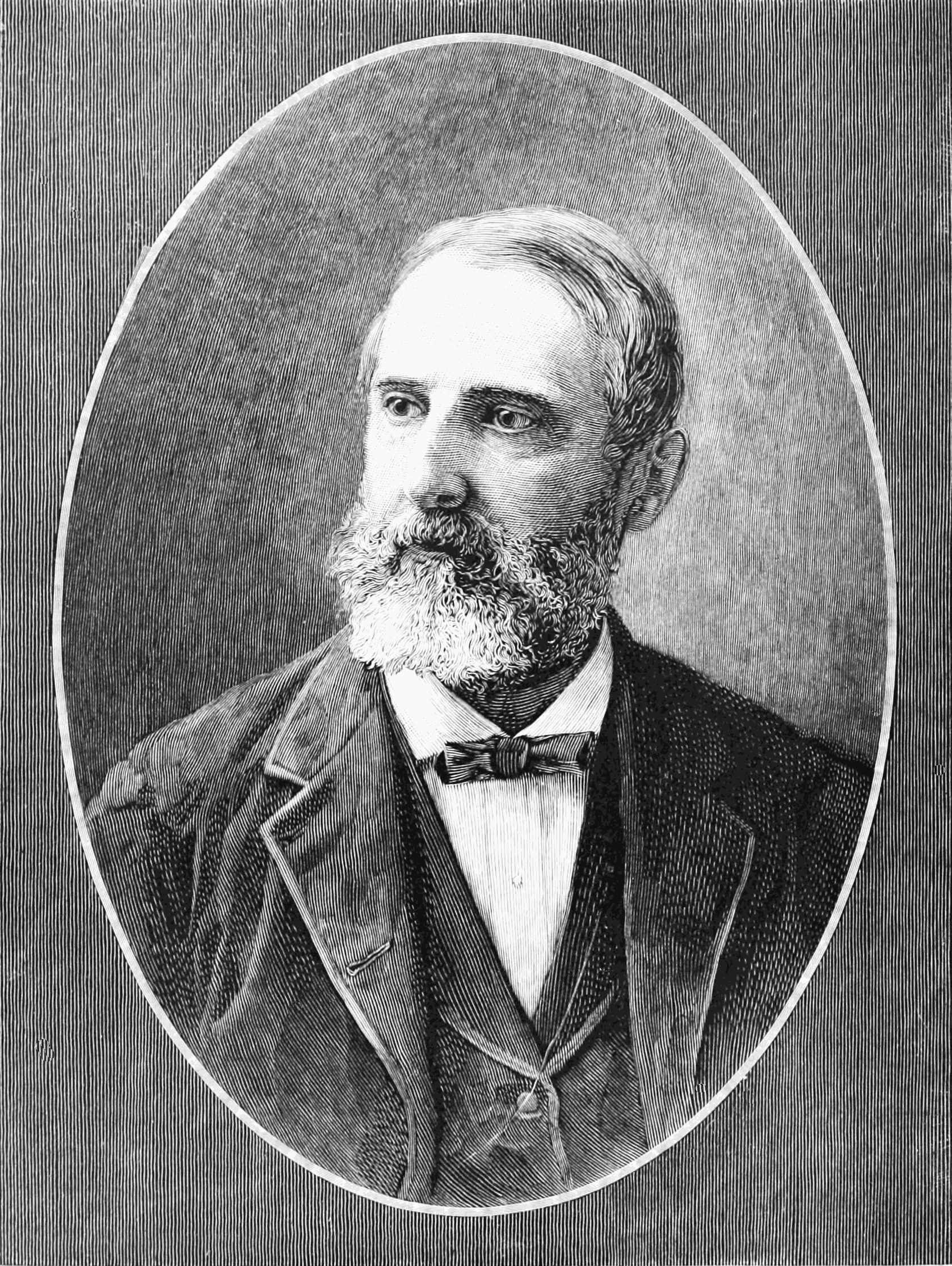
- Born: December 9, 1832; New York, New York, U.S.
- Died: January 15, 1900 (aged 67); New York, New York, U.S.
- Education: Yale University; École nationale supérieure des mines de Paris
- Occupation: Mining engineer

Thomas Egleston (December 9, 1832 – January 15, 1900) was an American engineer who helped found Columbia University's School of Mines, now the Fu Foundation School of Engineering and Applied Science. Throughout his lifetime, Egleston published numerous lectures and books on metallurgy. Many of his books are preserved today at the archive in the Library of Congress.

== Background and education ==
A native New Yorker, Egleston was the great-grandson of John Paterson, a major general in the Continental Army during the American Revolution. A graduate of Yale University under the counsel of Dr. Dudley in 1854, he continued his graduate study at Yale and further training in École nationale supérieure des mines de Paris in 1860, after which he was employed by the Smithsonian Museums in Washington D.C. In Paris, Egleston pursued his interest in geology and chemistry, attending lectures at the Jardin des Plantes of Paris. He spent time in collections and laboratories while listening to lectures by renowned Professor de Senarmont and Elie de Beaumont. After leaving Paris, Egleston traveled extensively in France and Germany to study geological collections.

== Founding of School of Mines ==
In 1863 Egleston drafted a plan for the establishment of a school of mines, today's Columbia School of Engineering and Applied Science connected with Columbia College. He was joined with Charles F. Chandler and Francis L. Vinton who jointly supervised the plan. Egleston became the first professor of mineralogy and metallurgy in 1864, and held that position until his death.

He died at his home in New York City on January 15, 1900.

== Works ==
In 1866, Egleston was commissioned to make geological survey of the then developing Union Pacific Railroad and examine fortifications in 1868. Egleston frequently consulted on metallurgical subject and was a regular advisor for the government on topics of furnace construction and the treatment of ores. In 1874, Egleston received an honorary degree of Ph.D. from Princeton and LL.D. from Trinity. Egleston was a member of the National Academy of Sciences and vice-president of the New York Academy of Sciences. He also served as president of the American Institute of Mining Engineers. Egleston was also owner of numerous metallurgical patents.

== Publications ==
The following is a list of Thomas Egleston's selected publications:

- "Tables for the Determinations of Minerals" (New York, 1867)
- "Metallurgical Tables on Copper, Lead, Silver, Gold, and other Metals " (1868)
- "Tables of Weights, Measures, and Coins of the United States and France" (1868)
- "Metallurgical Tables on Fuels, Iron, and Steel" (1869)
- "Lectures on Mineralogy" (1871)
- "The Metallurgy of Gold, Silver, and Mercury in the United States" (1887)
