= Minnesota Geological Survey =

- Established: 1872
- Location: 2609 Territorial Rd., Saint Paul, MN 55114
- Coordinates: 44°58′9″N 93°12′17″W
- Type: Geology of Minnesota
- Director: Robert Tipping
- Owner: University of Minnesota
- Website: https://cse.umn.edu/mgs

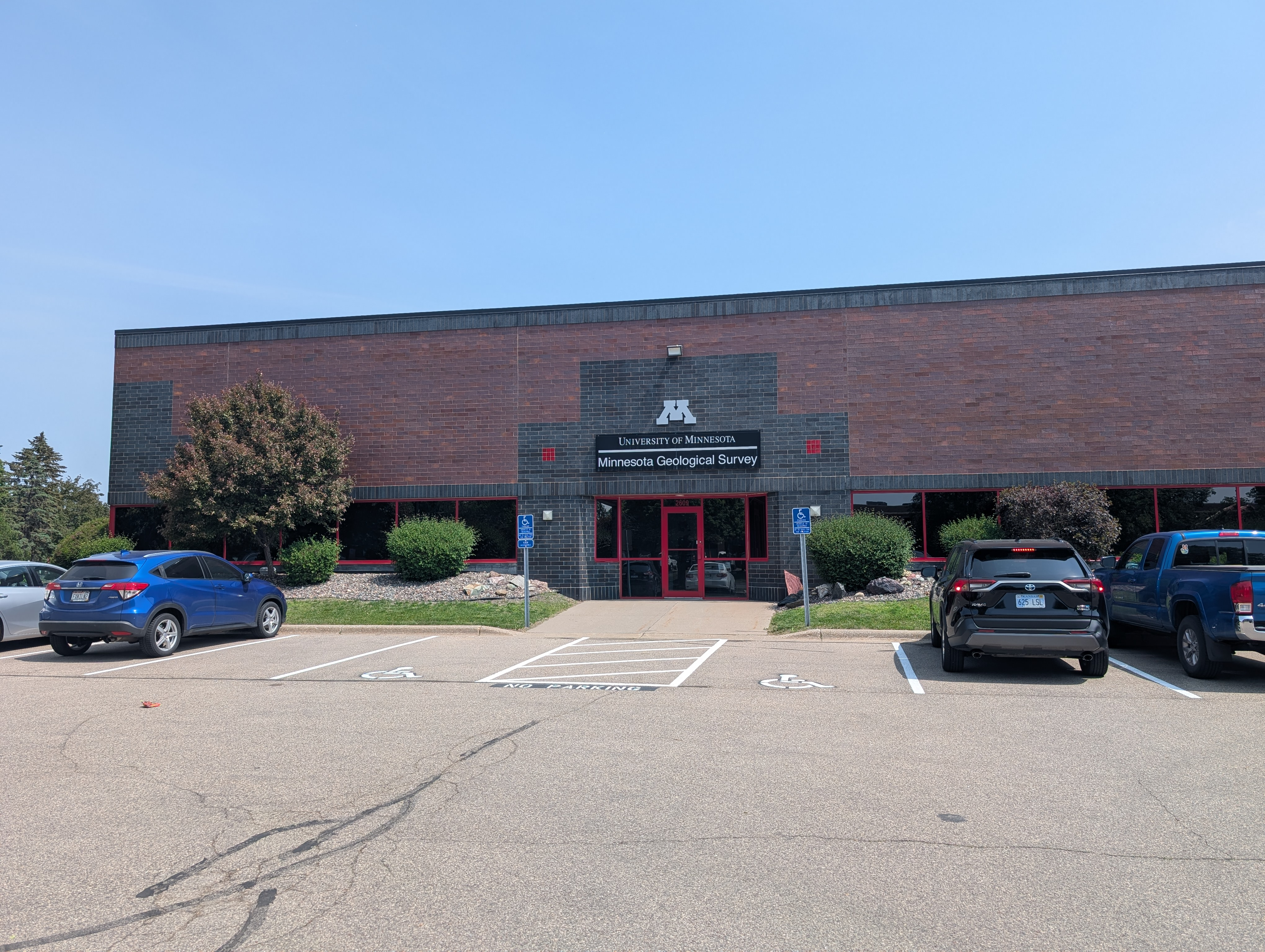
Minnesota Geological Survey building in 2025

The Minnesota Geological Survey is a unit of the Newton Horace Winchell School of Earth Sciences at the University of Minnesota.

== History ==
The Minnesota Geological Survey was established by the Minnesota State Legislature in 1872 as the Geological and Natural History Survey of Minnesota, and Newton Horace Winchell was appointed as its director.
