= Robert Pollack (biologist) =

American biologist

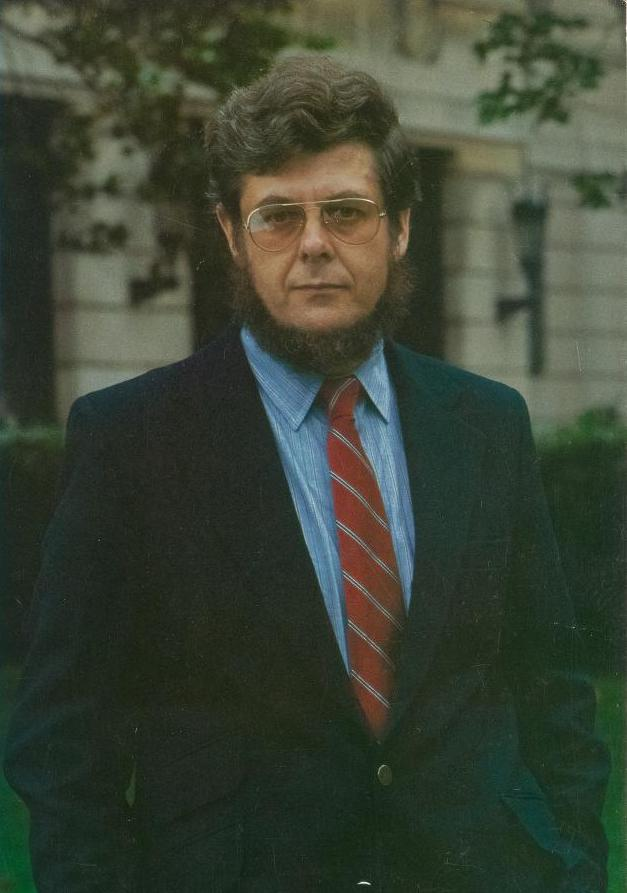
- Pollack in 1982
- Born: September 2, 1940 (age 86); New York City, US
- Education: Columbia College (BA), Brandeis University (PhD)
- Scientific career
- Fields: Biology
- Workplaces: Stony Brook University, Columbia University
- Website: https://scienceandsociety.columbia.edu/directory/robert-e-pollack

Robert Elliot Pollack (born September 2, 1940) is an American academic, administrator, biologist, and philosopher, who served as a long-time Professor of Biological Sciences at Columbia University.

Born in Brooklyn, Pollack earned a Bachelor of Arts in physics at Columbia College in 1961. He received a PhD in Biological Sciences from Brandeis University in 1966, and subsequently was a postdoctoral Fellow in Pathology at NYU Langone Health and the Weizmann Institute of Science. He was a senior staff scientist at Cold Spring Harbor Laboratory for nearly a decade, before becoming Associate Professor of Microbiology at Stony Brook University in 1975. He returned to Columbia University as a Professor of Biological Sciences in 1978. He served as Dean of Columbia College from 1982 to 1989. He founded the Center for the Study of Science and Religion (CSSR) in 1999, dedicated to exploring the intersection between faith and science. He served as Director of the Columbia University University Seminars from 2011 to 2019. He retired as Director of the CSSR, later renamed to the Research Cluster on Science and Subjectivity, in 2023.

Pollack has been credited as the father of reversion therapy, for his observation that cancer cells infected with different types of viruses could revert to non-oncogenic phenotypes. Subsequently, he published nearly one hundred scientific articles related to reversion. He later became a philosopher, examining his faith with a scientific lens, and, at the same time, reinterpreting science through faith. Pollack has authored over 200 scientific articles, seven books, and dozens of speeches, mostly delivered at Columbia University.

As the first Jewish Dean of an Ivy League institution, Pollack faced significant fundraising challenges, the AIDS epidemic, and conflict surrounding the issue of South African divestment. Being a scientific activist, he was the first to raise concerns about recombinant DNA technology, which eventually led to the Asilomar Conference. He also decried the corrupting relationship between scientific academia and industry and promoted scientific literacy among the general public. He set the stage for the inclusion of science in the Columbia College Core Curriculum. He ultimately converted the Research Cluster on Science and Subjectivity to an institution promoting undergraduates, encouraging a legacy of student-centered innovation. He has collaborated with and mentored many prominent scientists, including Nancy Hopkins and Bettie Steinberg.

== Education and early life ==
Robert Elliot Pollack was born on September 2, 1940, in Brooklyn, NY, growing up in the neighborhood of Seagate. His parents did not finish high school; his father ran a factory, manufacturing cardboard boxes. He attended Abraham Lincoln High School and studied at Columbia College, graduating in 1961 with a physics major. While at Columbia, he was a member of Jester Magazine and Columbia Daily Spectator. He took a freshman Core Course with Robert Belknap, whom he later succeeded as the Director of University Seminars at Columbia University. His favorite professors were Sidney Morgenbesser and Richard Neustadt, who taught philosophy and government, respectively. He worked as a laboratory assistant under the direction of Arno Penzias, then a graduate student in the lab of Charles H. Townes. Upon graduation, Pollack received a New York State Regents Teaching Fellowship to pursue graduate work at Brandeis University, examining differential expression of leucine transfer RNA in different strains of Escherichia coli following T2 or T4 virus infection.

== Research ==
In 1968, while working for Howard Green, Pollack published the first demonstration of reversion, a phenomenon whereby certain cancer cells demonstrated decreased growth and increased contact inhibition, thereafter being considered as reverted to a more normal non-oncogenic phenotype. Reversion was later suggested as a potential treatment for cancer. Pollack's work sparked a novel subfield of oncogenic research, elucidating the distinct mechanisms directing cell reversion.

== Academic career ==
=== Microbiologist ===
Graduating with a PhD in Biology from Brandeis University in 1966, he spent sixteen years as a research scientist, completing postdoctoral work at both N.Y.U. Medical Center and the Weizmann Institute in Israel. He thereafter served as a senior scientist at Cold Spring Harbor Laboratory from 1971 to 1975, became an Associate Professor of Biology at Stonybrook University from 1975 to 1978, and finally headed his own laboratory as a full Professor of Biology at Columbia University from 1978 to 1994.

=== Dean of Columbia College ===
Pollack served as Dean of Columbia College from 1982 to 1989. At the time of his appointment, the College was firmly in the Sovern era, facing a severe financial crisis, student protests related to South African divestment and concerns regarding the quality of student life, following the institution of co-education and subsequently declining admissions rates. During his tenure, he joined with the Columbia College faculty to oppose a merger with the faculties of other schools at Columbia University. Upon his resignation, he was praised for his honesty, independence, and involvement in student affairs.

==== Academic Initiatives ====
Pollack took a variety of academic stances during his tenure. At his encouragement, the faculty of the College voted to move up the pass-fail course registration deadline by one month. Pollack opposed the inclusion of computer science in the Core Curriculum. Pollack organized faculty committees to examine the development of additional majors in both African-American studies and gender studies. In 1983, Pollack awarded an honorary degree to Isaac Asimov, who had been forced due to racial quotas to attend Seth Low Junior College, later folded into the Columbia University School of General Studies.

Pollack supported the founding of the Rabi Scholar's cohort, named after Nobel Laureate Isidor Isaac Rabi. The program is designed to encourage talented students in the sciences to attend Columbia College. In 1989, Pollack applied for and received a one million dollar grant from the Howard Hughes Medical Institute, aimed at enhancing undergraduate science education and community outreach, which ensured long-term financial support for the Rabi Scholars program. Additionally, he founded the Summer Undergraduate Research Fellowship program in the Department of Biology, funding students pursuing on-campus summer research internships. He encouraged these students to consider careers in academic post-graduation.

==== Student Life ====
Notably, Pollack oversaw the admission of the first female-inclusive class in 1983, appointing a co-education coordinator to facilitate the transition. At the same time, he engineered a merger between the athletics programs of Barnard College and Columbia College. He pushed for renovations to the main student life center, later rebuilt as Alfred Lerner Hall.

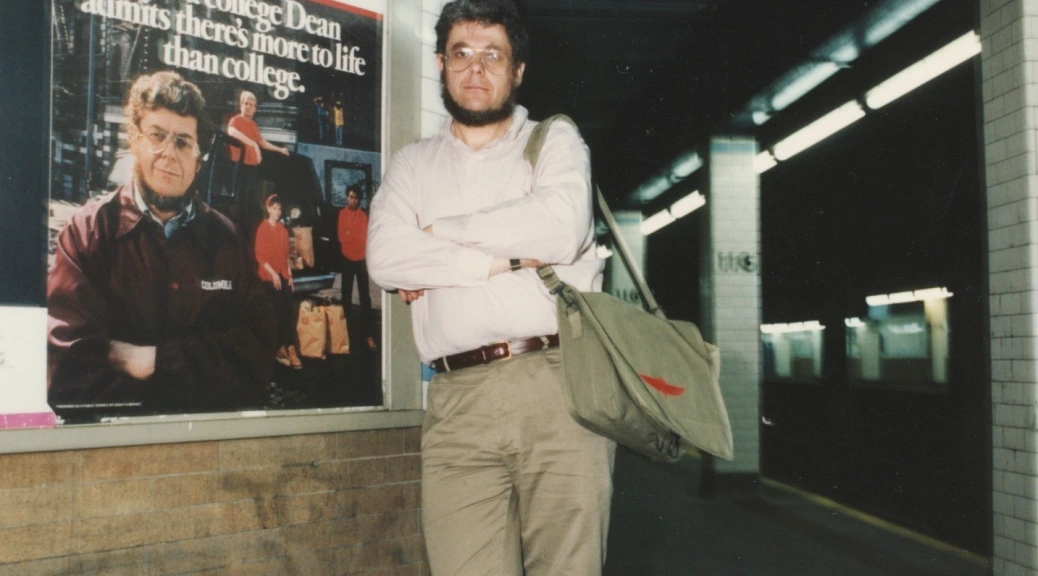
Dean Robert E. Pollack in front of a Columbia College poster, 1985

Pollack forwarded initiatives to ensure guaranteed housing for all students. A contemporary editorial by the Managing Board of the Columbia Daily Spectator noted that: "College Dean Robert Pollack is clinging to his guarantee of housing for all freshmen like a mother bear to its threatened cub." In addition to the acquisition of the Carlton Arms dormitory, he pushed for the construction of a new dorm on 115th street, which eventually became Schapiro Hall. He successfully convinced Morris Schapiro to donate an addition two million dollars to fund a student center for the arts in the basement of this dorm. Additionally, the college negotiated directly with manufacturers to install computer labs in residence.

In the face of significant financial constraints, Pollack vigorously and successfully defended Columbia College's need-blind admissions policy with alumni donations. A focus within his tenure was to support a more racially and ethnically diverse student body. To this end, he supported the development of an intercultural resource center, bolstering undergraduate student life.

==== AIDS Epidemic ====
Pollack was one of the first university administers to meet with LGBTQ groups during the AIDS epidemic. He later led an initiative to formulate an AIDS-related policy for Columbia's campus. Additionally, Pollack called for the development of an AIDS vaccine.

==== South African Divestment ====
In response to increasing student activism related to divestment from South Africa, the Columbia University Senate voted on March 25, 1983, to recommend total divestment, which was in turn rejected by the Trustees of the University. In response, the University Senate appointed Pollack, alongside Louis Henkin and then-student Barbara Ransby, to a seven-member committee, charged with researching university divestment and reporting their results to the trustees. Pollack was selected to chair the committee. Due to opposition from Ransby, the report could not be presented to the University Senate by the end of the 1984 academic year. In response, Pollack directly requested that Columbia University President Michael Sovern recommend that the trustees freeze investments in South Africa, a principal recommendation of the report, which thereafter became known as the Pollack Report. The trustees responded favorably to Pollack's request, instituting a freeze on new investments in June, 1984. The committee, containing a new student representative, approved the report on November 15, 1984, followed by ratification in December, 1984 by the University Senate. In addition to a freeze on investments, the report recommended the formation of a consortium of universities to organize against apartheid, the continuous monitoring of current South African investments by a standing committee, and the funding of educational programs to study social politics in South Africa. Although Pollack strongly defended the committee's work, student activists continued to push for total divestment, organizing a fast and protest simultaneously, blockading the entrance to Hamilton Hall for three weeks. While the trustees accepted only three proposals from the Pollack Report, choosing to maintain the temporary investment freeze agreed to with Pollack in 1984, a worsening human rights situation in South Africa led Pollack and other university administrators to also push for total divestment. The trustees thereafter accepted a two-year divestment plan in October, 1985, making Columbia University the first private institution to move toward total divestment. In order to fund the educational programs recommended by the Pollack Report, the University received a one million dollar grant in 1986 from the Ford Foundation to support interdisciplinary courses in human rights.

==== Columbia College Bicentennial ====
In 1987, Columbia College celebrated its bicentennial, commemorating the signing of the College charter, in 1987. Pollack led a series of reflection sessions in advance of the event, championing recent advances in African American and Women's studies. He later gave speeches at major gatherings and parades, celebrating the close ties between Columbia College and New York City.

==== Racial Tensions at Columbia ====
Protests by hundreds of students erupted following a racially motivated fight between students in the College in March, 1987. In response, Pollack organized a meeting between black student leaders and Columbia University President Michael Sovern. Sovern next met with the Columbia College student council, yielding limited results. As a result, approximately one month later, student leaders organized a protest blockading Hamilton Hall, reminiscent of the protests during South African Divestment. 50 students were arrested, sparking a nearly one thousand person strong protest. In response, Pollack released a report regarding the March 22nd fight, charging junior Drew Krause with racial harassment and suspending him for one semester. In response, Krause sued Columbia University for discrimination, winning in federal court and overturning his suspension. When the University appealed this ruling, the two parties entered arbitration, settling outside of court.

In 1984, Pollack came out against an African-American studies major, favoring a more broadly encompassing minority studies major. Therefore, in 1986, minority studies became an approved major, while proposals for African-American studies languished. Four days after the March 22nd fight, the African-American studies proposal was brought before the committee on instruction with Pollack's approval, and ratified by the faculty nearly a month afterwards. Therefore, the 1987-1988 academic year therefore became the first where African-American studies was an offered major.

Over the course of the Fall, 1987 semester, Pollack developed a plan to use a 25 million dollar donation from John Kluge to encourage graduate studies for underrepresented groups. He additionally appointed a race relations committee, headed by Professor Charles Hamilton. The committee provided fourteen recommendations, accepted by Pollack, including an investment in the Columbia University Double Discovery Center along with increased hiring of minority faculty.

==== Research Contributions During Deanship ====
Alongside his administrative responsibilities, Pollack maintained an active role in scientific research. His work focused on understanding the molecular mechanisms of cellular differentiation and cancer cell transformation, specifically investigating the role of viral proteins and the cellular cytoskeleton in oncogenesis. Notable publications include studies on insulin binding by 3T3 cells, the role of the cytoskeleton in colonic epithelial cells, and adipocyte differentiation by DNA transfection. Additionally, he spoke out regarding the relationship between academia and industry science.

=== Co-Chair of the Jewish Campus Life Fund ===
Near the end of his term as Dean and afterwards, Pollack was considered for a wide variety of academic positions at other universities, including as provost at University of Pennsylvania, as president of University of Vermont, as president of Bowdoin College, and as president of Brandeis University. He ultimately continued as Professor of Biological Sciences at Columbia University, becoming the Co-Chair of the Jewish Campus Life Fund. In this role, he convinced Robert Kraft to donate the necessary funds to establish the Robert K. Kraft Family Center for Jewish Student Life at Columbia, which opened in 2000. He continued to comment on current issues, defending David Baltimore during the Imanishi-Kari case and advocating for need-blind admissions policies.

He was awarded a Guggenheim Fellowship in 1993 to write a book on the definition of disease. From these efforts arose Pollack's first book geared for the general public, entitled Signs of Life: the Language and Meanings of DNA (1994). In 1999, Pollack published his second book, The Missing Moment: How the Unconscious Shapes Modern Science (Houghton Mifflin), which offers reflection on mortality, morality, and the role of science in society. The Missing Moment ultimately critiques the biomedical field's tendency to overlook human needs by operating within a paradigm that denies personal mortality.

=== Director of the Center for the Study of Science and Religion ===
Pollack founded the Center for the Study of Science and Religion, later renamed the Research Cluster for Science and Subjectivity, in 1999, receiving a number of notable grants to power its operations, spanning diverse colloquial efforts, undergraduate course support, and a medical writer-in-residence program. In 2000, he published The Faith of Biology and the Biology of Faith: Order, meaning and free will in modern science, examining the relationship between religious belief and scientific practice. Originally presented at the Columbia University Seminar 1999 Leonard Hastings Schoff Memorial Lecture, the text was republished in 2013, with a new preface emphasizing individual responsibility over scientific institutions, in discussing the role of free will in scientific practice. He participated in a 2003 interview with Robert Wright, underscoring Pollack's approach to finding balance and meaning at the intersection between scientific inquiry and spiritual belief. He partnered with Jeffrey Sachs, moving the CSSR to the Earth Institute, turning his attention to the study of climate change during the later 2000s.

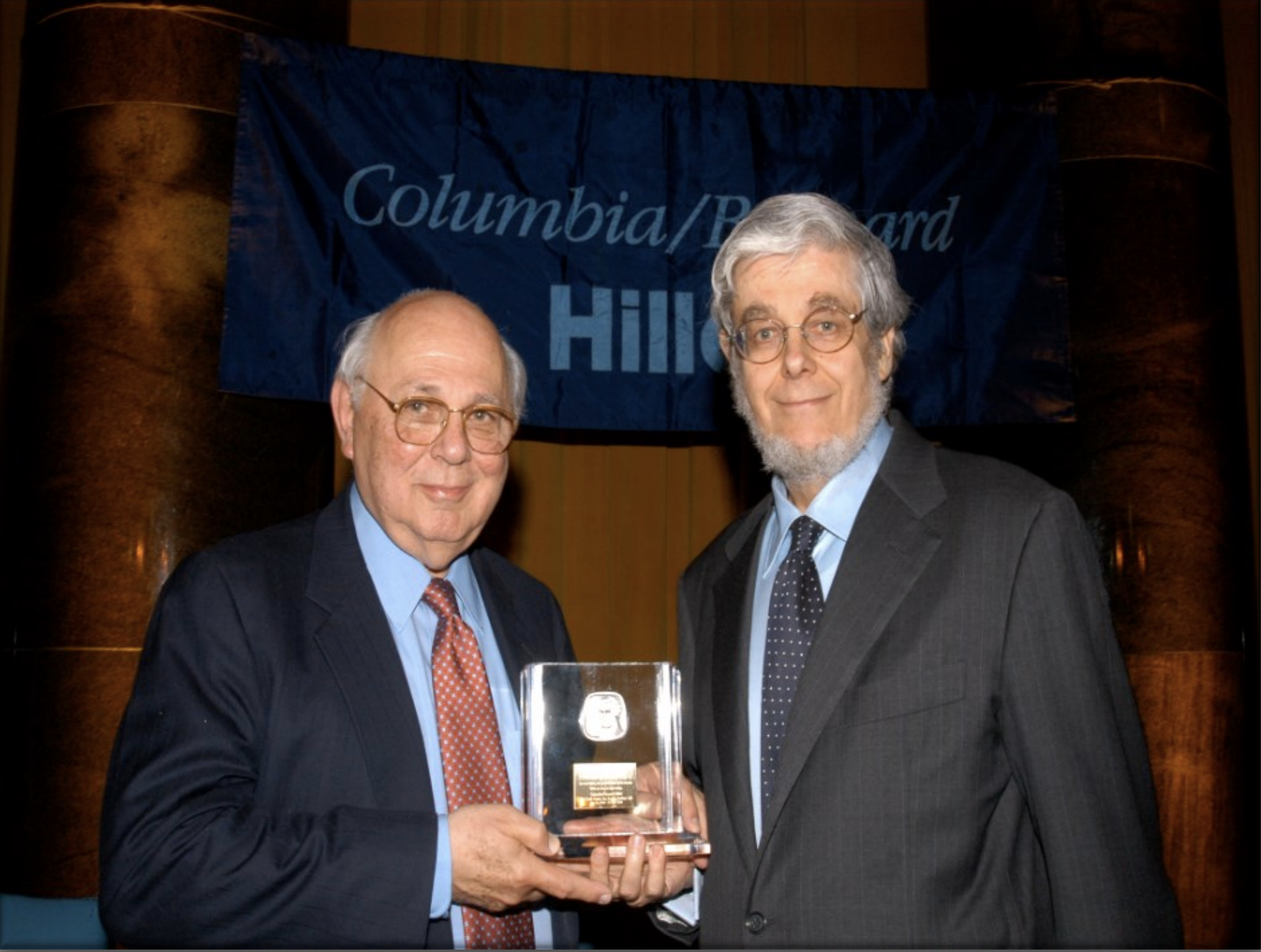
Mr. Harvey Krueger with Dr. Robert Pollack at the Seixas Award Dinner, 2008

From 2011 to 2019, Pollack concurrently served as the Director of the Columbia University seminars, a movement fostering interdisciplinary conversations between academics, founded by Frank Tannenbaum. In his role as Director, he played an important role in the creation of the University Seminar Archive.

Starting in 2014, Pollack changed the mission of the RCSS to focus on empowering undergraduate projects. He received an endowment from College alumnus Harvey Krueger '51 to perpetually fund these undergraduate efforts. An exemplar of this vision is the fully-funded Black Undergraduate Mentorship Program in Biology at Columbia, providing summer research housing stipends and significant individualized mentorship, with support from both Harmen Bussemaker and Nobel Laureate Martin Chalfie. Pollack retired as director in 2023. He continues to serve on the advisory board of the RCSS and as an executive committee member for the Columbia University Center for Science and Society.

== Teaching ==
=== Cold Spring Harbor Laboratory ===
As a research scientist in Nobel Laureate James Watson's laboratory, Pollack taught a yearly summer course on animal cells and viruses. In 1971, his class heard a presentation from Janet Mertz, then a graduate student in the laboratory of Paul Berg, who proposed an experiment cloning SV40 genes from monkeys into bacteria. Pollack reacted to this presentation by directly calling Berg to relay his concerns and drafting an unsent letter calling for a moratorium on this kind of cloning. His concerns centered on the potential for these bacteria to be capable of inducing cancer, which could possibly spread rapidly through the human population. Berg accepted these concerns, starting a voluntary moratorium. In 1973, a conference was held at Asilomar, with Pollack editing the proceedings into a book entitled Biohazards in biological research, specifically identifying the necessary experiments to deem recombinant DNA technologies safe. In 1974, this expanded into the first national moratorium on a specific subset of scientific research, followed by the more-famous Asilomar Conference in 1975, which answered many of the safety concerns recombinant DNA technologies raised at the 1973 conference, thereby paving the way to lift the national moratorium. The response of the scientific community to recombinant DNA technologies has been scrutinized in debates regarding CRISPR-based genome modification technologies.

=== Columbia University ===
Pollack has taught a variety of lecture and seminar style courses at Columbia University, including, [BIOL W2001] Environmental Biology, [BIOL W3500] Independent research, [BIOL G4065] Molecular Biology of Disease, [RELI V2660] Science & Religion East & West, and [EEEBGU4321] Human Nature: DNA, Race & Identity: Our Bodies, Our Selves. Arriving at Columbia in 1978, he soon joined the Columbia College Committee on Instruction, responsible for approving academic policy changes, new courses, and new major proposals. Pollack has been a consistent supporter of the Core Curriculum as a mandatory component of undergraduate education.

Pollack was an early advocate for the inclusion of science curriculum within Columbia's Core Curriculum. To accomplish this goal, Pollack, alongside Herbert Goldstein and Jonathon Gross, developed a course entitled the Theory and Practice of Science, aimed at providing scientific literacy to the general student population, funded by a $30,000 grant from the Exxon Mobil Foundation along with an anonymous $30,000 donation, later revealed to be a personal donation from Columbia University President Michael Sovern. Based on a belief that fundamental scientific papers double as literary masterpieces, Pollack's portion of the course was organized around key publications in biochemistry, evolution, and genetics. In 1983, the course received an additional $240,000 in support from the Mellon Foundation. Although the course was taught for at least fourteen years, it failed enter the core curriculum, due to concerns regarding the breadth of technical concepts within the discussed works. Pollack later contributed to and taught in Frontiers of Science, a general science curriculum developed by David Helfand and Darcy Kelley, former instructors for The Theory and Practice of Science, which was added to the Core Curriculum in 2005.

== Awards and honors ==
Pollack has received the Alexander Hamilton Medal from Columbia University, Columbia College's most distinguished award for alumni. He has additionally received the Gershom Mendes Seixas Award from the Columbia/Barnard Hillel organization. His book Signs of Life: the Language and Meanings of DNA (1994) received the Lionel Trilling Award. In 1986, he was appointed by NYC mayor Ed Koch to an advisory committee on science and technology.

== Personal life ==
Pollack is married to Amy Steinberg, an artist. They co-authored The Course of Nature: A Book of Drawings on Natural Selection and Its Consequences (2014), consisting of Steinberg's drawings and Pollack's commentary. Their daughter Marya Pollack, who graduated as a member of the first coeducational class of students from Columbia College in 1987, is an attending physician at New York Presbyterian Hospital and Assistant Clinical Professor in Psychiatry at Columbia University Vagelos College of Physicians and Surgeons.

== Books ==
In addition to his academic and administrative positions, Pollack has written many articles and books on diverse subjects, ranging from laboratory science to religious ethics.

- Readings in mammalian cell culture, first edition (Cold Spring Harbor Laboratory Press, 1975) ISBN 0879691166
- Readings in mammalian cell culture, second edition (Cold Spring Harbor Laboratory Press, 1982) ISBN 9780879691370
- Signs of Life: The Language and Meanings of DNA (Houghton Mifflin, 1994) ISBN 0395735300
- The Missing Moment: How the Unconscious shapes Modern Science (Houghton Mifflin, 1999) ISBN 0395709857
- The Faith of Biology and the Biology of Faith (Columbia University Press, 2000) ISBN 9780231529051
- The Faith of Biology and the Biology of Faith, With a New Preface by the Author (Columbia University Press, 2013) ISBN 9780231115070
- The Course of Nature: A Book of Drawings on Natural Selection and Its Consequences (Stony Creek Press, 2014) ISBN 1499122241

Academic offices
Preceded by Arnold Collery	Dean of Columbia College; 1982 – 1989	Succeeded by Jack Greenberg
