= Lillian Milgram Schapiro =

American pediatrician

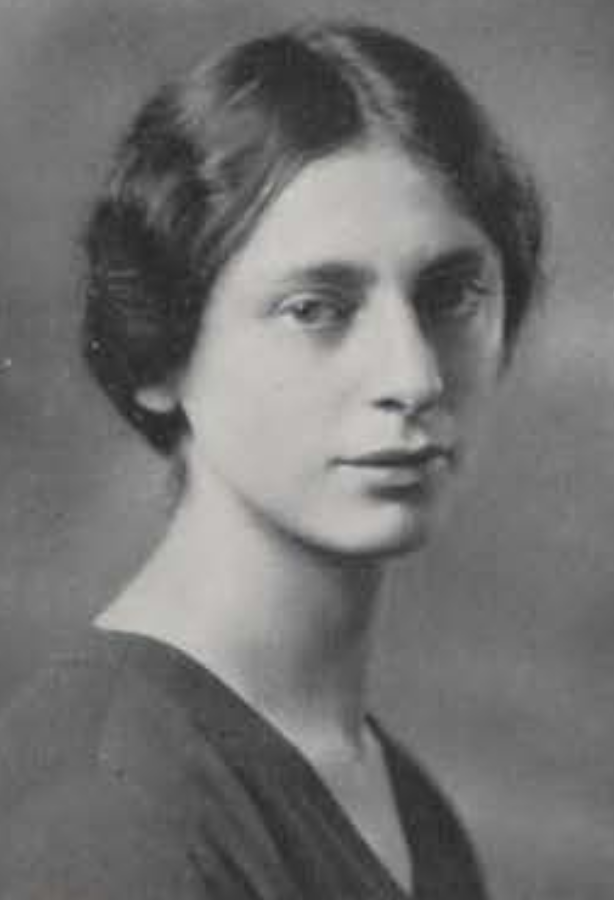
- Lillian Milgram (later Schapiro), from the 1928 yearbook of Bellevue Hospital Medical College
- Born: August 20, 1902; Brooklyn, New York, U.S.
- Died: September 6, 2006 (age 104); Manhattan, New York, U.S.
- Occupation: Pediatrician
- Spouse: Meyer Schapiro
- Children: 2
- Relatives: Morris Schapiro (brother-in-law)

Lillian Milgram Schapiro (August 20, 1902 – September 6, 2006) was an American pediatrician, a specialist in the treatment of childhood tuberculosis. She was also known as the wife and assistant of art historian Meyer Schapiro, and she worked on publishing his writings after his death.

== Early life and education ==
Milgram was born in Brooklyn, New York, the daughter of Benjamin Milgram and Dora Silverstone Milgram. Her parents were both immigrants from Russia. She graduated from Barnard College in 1924, and from the Bellevue Hospital Medical College in 1928. Her brother Joseph Milgram was an orthopedic surgeon.

== Career ==
Schapiro served internships and residency at Bellevue Hospital, with some further training in Europe in the 1930s. She taught in the Children's Tuberculosis Division at Bellevue, and had a private practice in pediatrics in Greenwich Village.

Schapiro also assisted her husband, Meyer Schapiro, in his work as an art historian. She compiled a bibliography of his work in 1995, and after he died, she worked on publishing some of his writings posthumously, editing and writing introductory essays to accompany his work. The couple gave a series of interviews between 1992 and 1995; highlights from these interviews were published in 1997.

== Publications ==
- "Body Build in Infants: IV. The Influence of Retarded Growth" (1934, with Harry Bakwin and Ruth Morris Bakwin)
- "Promizole Treatment of Miliary Tuberculosis: Toxic Effects on Thyroid Gland and Maturation" (1947, with Irving Levitt and Maya S. Unna)
- "Skeletal Tuberculosis in Children Treated for Primary and Miliary Tuberculosis" (1956)
- Meyer Schapiro: The Bibliography (1995)

== Personal life ==
Milgram married Meyer Schapiro in 1928. They had two children, Miriam and Ernest. Her husband died in 1996, and she died in 2006, at the age of 104.
