= CSSR =

CSSR may refer to:

- Czechoslovak Socialist Republic (Czech and Slovak: ČSSR), onetime name of Czechoslovakia
- Climate Science Special Report, Volume 1 of the Fourth National Climate Assessment (NCA4) 2017/2018
- Canadian Society for the Study of Religion
- Canadian Society for the Study of Rhetoric
- Causal-state splitting reconstruction (an algorithm for learning a predictive model)
- Center for the Study of Science and Religion, a center inside The Earth Institute at Columbia University
- Congregatio Sanctissimi Redemptoris, Latin name of the Congregation of the Most Holy Redeemer, abbreviated to C.Ss.R
- Council with Social Services Responsibilities, part of the UK Healthcare Commission
- Centre for Social Studies and Reforms (CSSR), based in Cochin, Kerala, India
- Call setup success rate, a term used in telecommunications denoting the percentage of the attempts to make a call which result in a connection to the dialed number
- Conservative Site-specific recombination
