= Vaudoise Assurances =

Swiss insurance company

- Formerly: Assurance mutuelle vaudoise contre les accidents
- Traded as: SIX: VAHN
- Industry: Insurance
- Founded: 1895
- Headquarters: Lausanne, Switzerland
- Revenue: CHF 1,518.8 million (2025)
- Net income: CHF 156.3 million (2025)
- Number of employees: 2,013 (full-time equivalent) (2025)
- Website: vaudoise.ch

Vaudoise Assurances (German: Vaudoise Versicherungen; Italian: Vaudoise Assicurazioni) is a Swiss insurance company based in Lausanne. It was founded in 1895 as a cooperative, the Assurance mutuelle vaudoise contre les accidents ("Vaud mutual insurance against accidents"), expanded throughout Switzerland after 1945, took the name Vaudoise Assurances in 1975, and was converted into a holding company in 1989.

== History ==
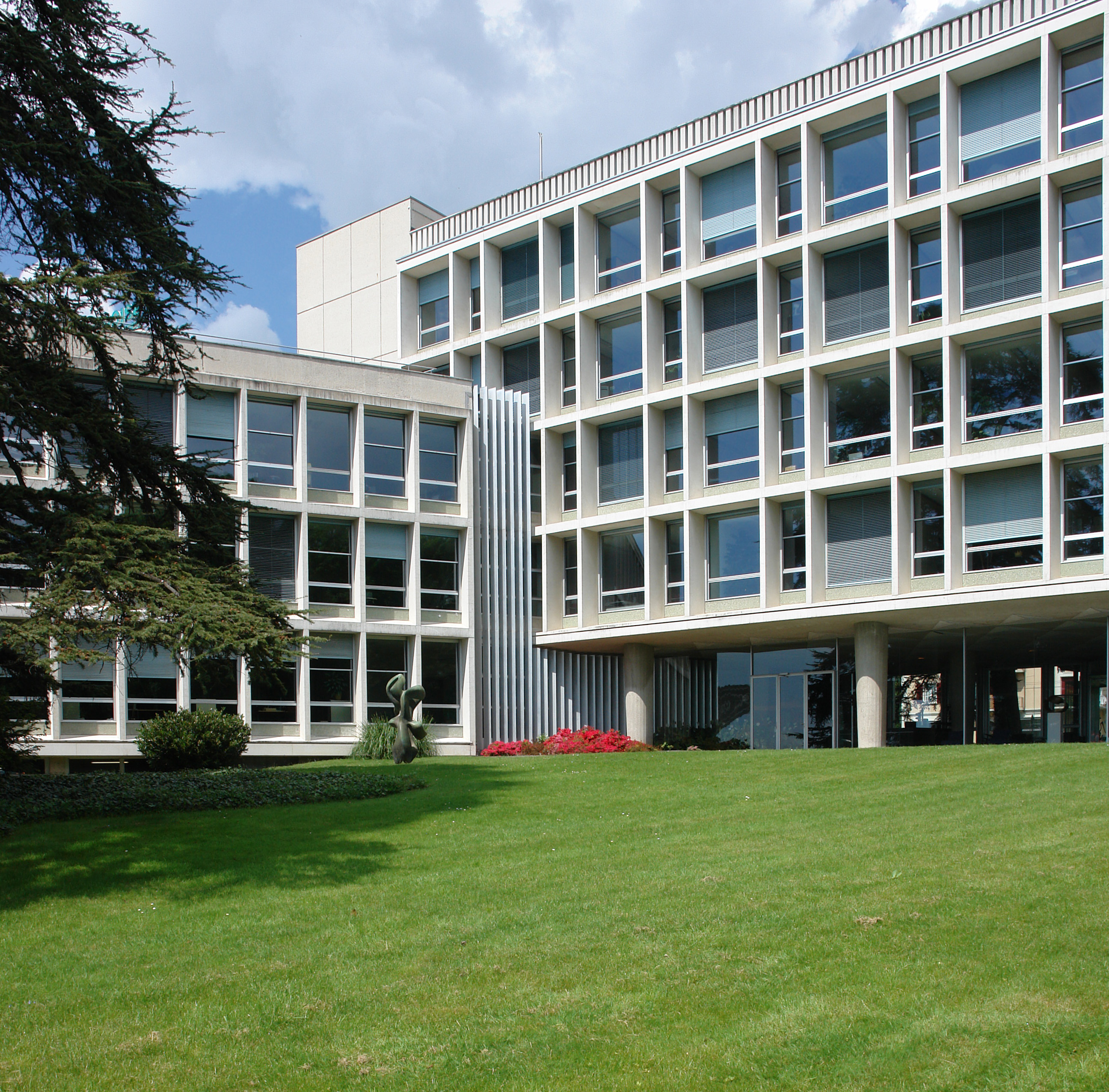
Les Cèdres, the headquarters in Lausanne, designed by Jean Tschumi and built in 1952–1956

Founded in 1895 by a group of craftsmen on the initiative of Louis Zwahlen, the accident insurance cooperative Assurance mutuelle vaudoise contre les accidents covered the civil liability of businesses. After 1945 it expanded throughout Switzerland. The company took the name Vaudoise Assurances in 1975 and was converted into a holding company in 1989.

In 2024 the company had more than 2,100 employees and almost 480,000 customers. Its services include in particular individual pension provision and personal, animal, and property insurance. It held seven direct subsidiaries: Vaudoise Générale, Vaudoise Vie, Epona, Vaudoise Asset Management SA, Pittet Associés SA, Vaudoise Services SA, and Prevanto Holding AG.

In 1964 the company co-founded the health insurance fund Intras, which was integrated into CSS Insurance in 2008. In 2024 Vaudoise Assurances made a consolidated net profit of 147 million francs.

== Bibliography ==
- Encyclopédie illustrée du Pays de Vaud, vol. 3, 1972, p. 176; vol. 9, 1981, p. 116
