= Schapiro Hall =

Coordinates: 40°48′28.2″N 73°57′54.69″W

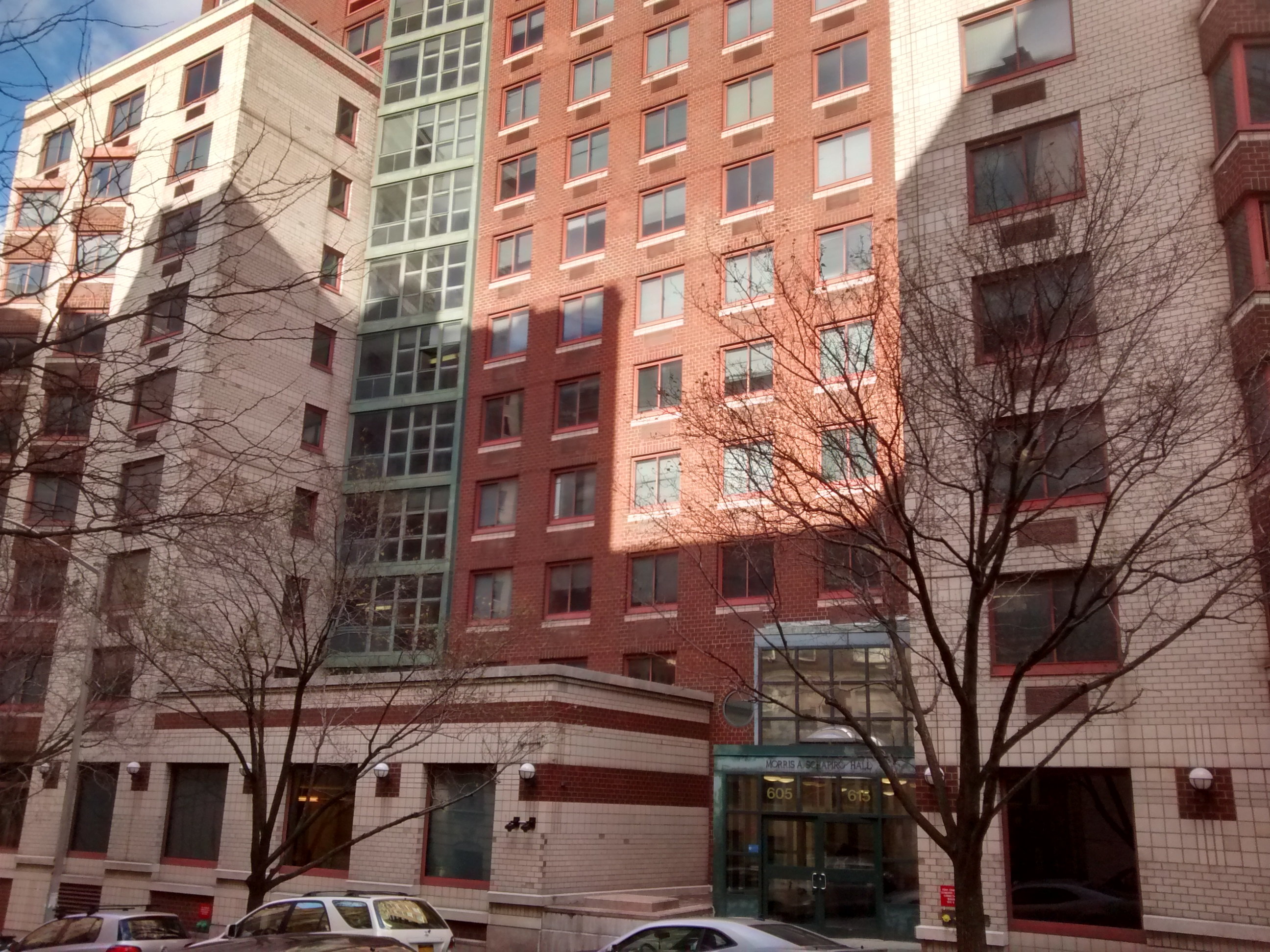
- Schapiro Hall in 2015

General information
- Address: 605 W. 115th Street, New York City, New York
- Named for: Morris Schapiro
- Opened: 1988
- Owner: Columbia University

Technical details
- Floor count: 17

Design and construction
- Architect(s): Gruzen Samton Steinglass

Morris A. Schapiro Hall, popularly known as Schapiro, is an undergraduate residence hall of Columbia University. The building is named after investment banker Morris Schapiro, who oversaw the merger of Chase Bank and Bank of Manhattan as well as the Chemical Bank and New York Trust Company.

== Overview ==
It is located half a block from the university's main campus, near the intersection of Broadway and 115th Street in the Morningside Heights neighborhood of the borough of Manhattan in New York City. Upon its completion in 1988, at a cost of $18 million, Schapiro allowed the university to house all its undergraduates in dormitories for the first time, a vision originally pushed for by then-Dean of Columbia College Robert Pollack. This policy is now promised to all current and incoming undergraduate students at Columbia and Barnard.

== Facilities ==
The 17-story building is one of the newer residences at Columbia and contains 245 single and 85 double residences, music practice rooms, floor lounges, and two study spaces. The "Penthouse," the 17th floor, has a quiet study space for students and no residential rooms. The building was designed by the architectural firm Gruzen Samton Steinglass.

== Famous residents ==
- Patrick Radden Keefe, American author and winner of the Baillie Gifford Prize in 2021
