= Robert P. Lamont House =

Historic house in Illinois, United States

- U.S. National Register of Historic Places
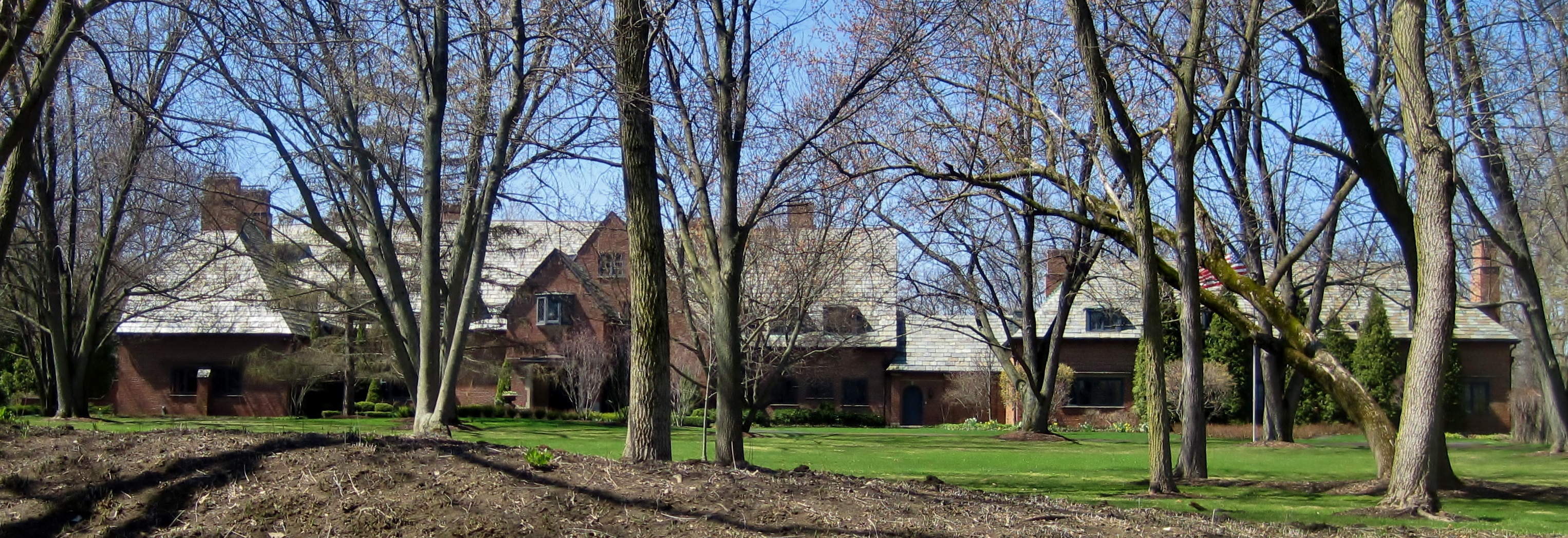

- Location within Chicago metropolitan area Location within Illinois Location within the United States
- Location: 810 S. Ridge Rd., Lake Forest, Illinois
- Coordinates: 42°13′25″N 87°51′21″W
- Area: 7 acres (2.8 ha)
- Built: 1924–25
- Architect: Howard Van Doren Shaw
- Architectural style: Tudor Revival
- NRHP reference No.: 93001240
- Added to NRHP: November 12, 1993

The Robert P. Lamont House is a historic house at 810 S. Ridge Road in Lake Forest, Illinois. The house was built in 1924–25 for Robert P. Lamont, the president of American Steel Foundries; Lamont later became the United States secretary of commerce under Herbert Hoover. Prominent Chicago architect Howard Van Doren Shaw designed the Tudor Revival style country house, which was one of the many homes he designed for Lake Forest's wealthy residents in the early twentieth century. While Tudor Revival was one of the many revival styles popular for country houses at the time, the style is unusual among Shaw's work in Lake Forest. The house's design features a long front facade with a brick exterior, oriel and casement windows, wood and stone details, a complex roof structure with gabled and hipped sections, and multiple stone chimneys.

The house was added to the National Register of Historic Places on November 12, 1993.
