= Quadrangle Club =

Eating club at Princeton University

- U.S. Historic district – Contributing property
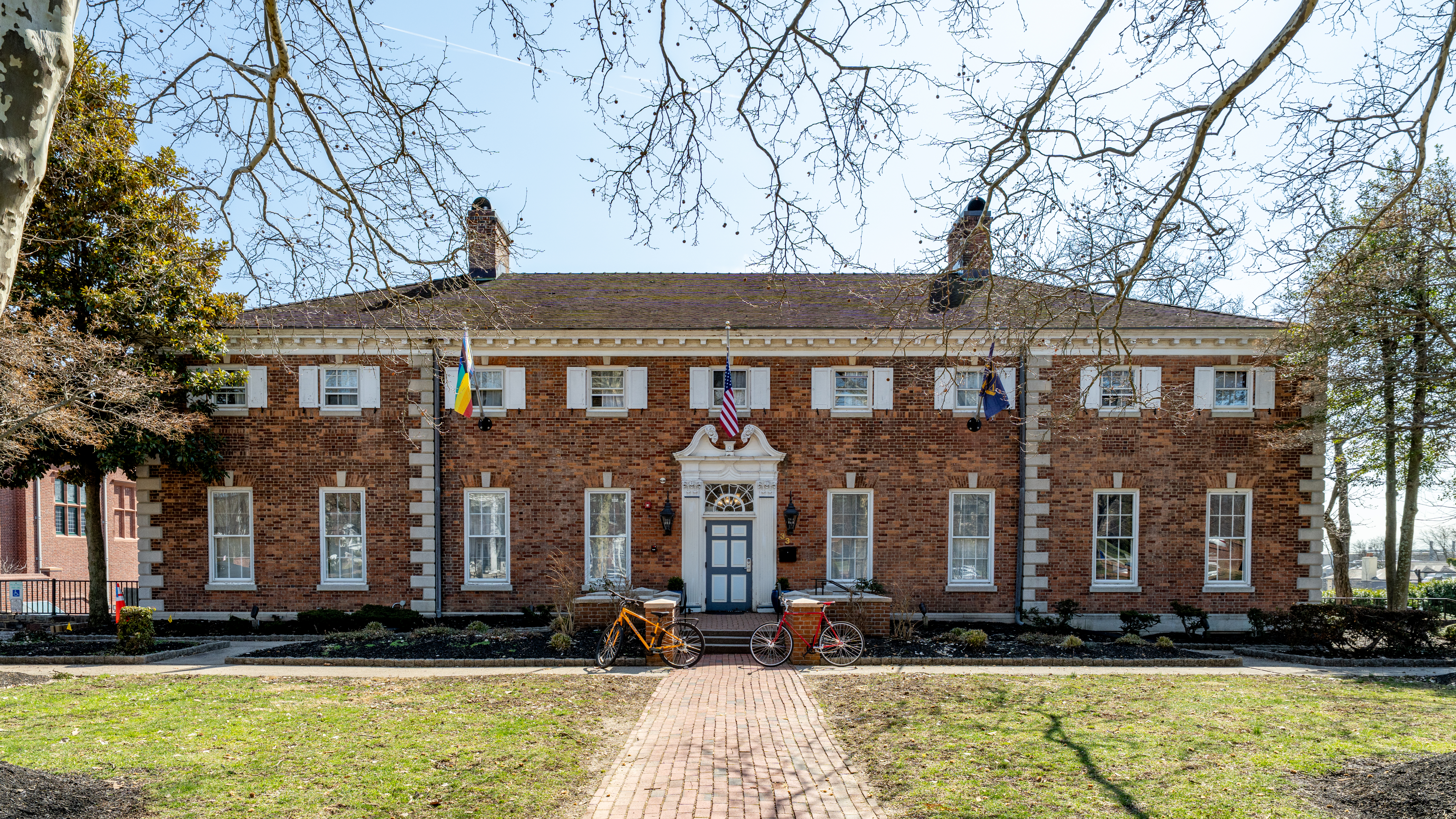

- Location within Mercer County, New Jersey Location within New Jersey Location within the United States
- Location: 33 Prospect Ave, Princeton, New Jersey
- Coordinates: 40°20′52.8″N 74°39′09.8″W
- Built: 1916
- Architect: Henry Milliken
- Architectural style: Georgian Revival
- Part of: Princeton Historic District (ID75001143)
- Added to NRHP: 27 June 1975

The Princeton Quadrangle Club, often abbreviated to "Quad", is one of the eleven eating clubs at Princeton University that remain open. Located at 33 Prospect Avenue, the club is currently "sign-in," meaning it permits any second-semester sophomore, junior or senior to join. The club's tradition of openness is demonstrated as far back as 1970, when Quadrangle became one of the first coeducational eating clubs (Princeton University itself began admitting women in 1969, and the last eating clubs to include women did so in 1991).

== History ==
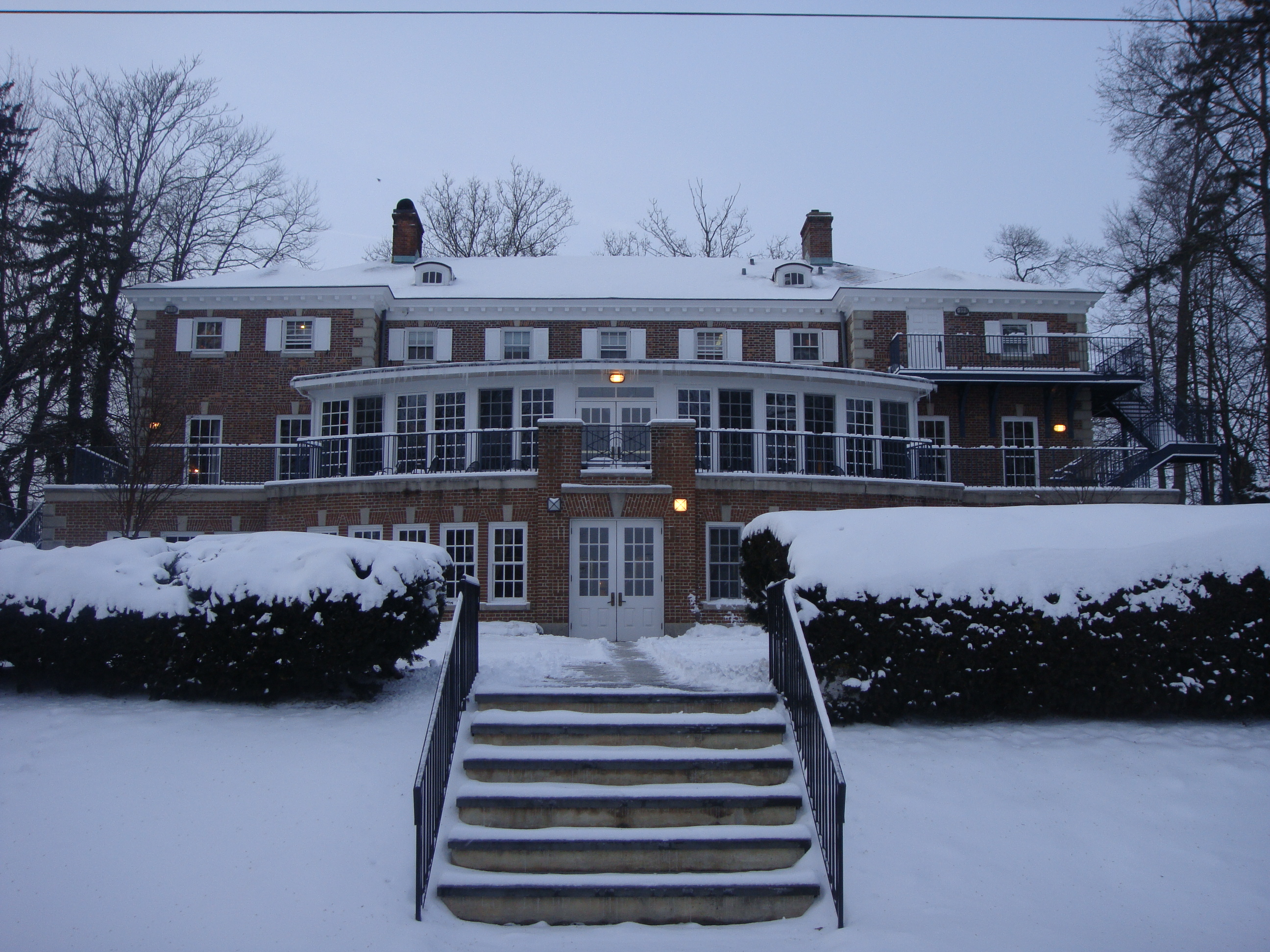
The Georgian Revival structure was designed by Henry Milliken (Princeton Class of '05) in 1915

The club was formed in 1896 in a house built on the south side of Prospect Avenue. In its early years, it changed its location several times. In 1901, it moved to the north side of "the Street," and in 1903 it moved back to the south side, where the Princeton Tower Club now stands. In 1910 it moved to a house built in 1887 for James McCosh, the eleventh president of Princeton University. In 1915, Quadrangle Club sold the McCosh house and built its own house, designed by Henry Milliken, Princeton Class of 1905 in a classic brick Georgian Revival structure capped by a Ludowici tile roof. The club has existed in this building since 1916.

F. Scott Fitzgerald described Quadrangle Club in This Side of Paradise as "Literary Quadrangle." Fitzgerald later commented that he might have felt more comfortable in "Literary Quadrangle" with contemporaries such as John Peale Bishop, an American poet.

In 2016, Quad signed-in 115 new members, a 342% increase from the year before and more than any other sign-in eating club except for Terrace Club. The current Chairman of the Board is alumnus Dinesh Maneyapanda.

== Musical tradition ==
With some funding from the Princeton Undergraduate Student Government, the Quadrangle Club has hosted to some of the biggest concerts on Princeton's campus, including Barenaked Ladies in 1993, Lifehouse in 2003, Maroon 5 in 2004, Rihanna in 2006, and T-Pain in 2013. These concerts have been documented as having drawn more than half of the university's entire undergraduate population. Below is a listing of the groups that have performed at the club in recent years at the semiannual University-wide festival called "Lawnparties".

The club’s perspicacious interest in music also extends to identifying early musical talent and booking intimate club music evenings with future superstars. For example, in the late 1980s Blues Traveler played a party at Quadrangle before the release of their first album.

Year	Performing Groups (Spring)	Performing Groups (Fall)
2003	Lifehouse	George Clinton and P-Funk All-Stars
2004	Maroon 5	N/A (Note: A comedy event was held instead of a concert.)
2005	Phantom Planet and The Gin Blossoms	Jurassic 5
2006	Ghostface Killah and Rooney	Rihanna and The Pink Spiders
2007	Less Than Jake and Reel Big Fish	Everclear and The Fold
2008	Howie Day and New Found Glory	Matt Nathanson and Lupe Fiasco
2009	Gym Class Heroes	N/A (Note: The money for the concert was instead donated to the Pace Center.)
2010	The Roots	Super Mash Bros and B.o.B
2011	Big K.R.I.T. and Wiz Khalifa	Far East Movement and The White Panda
2012	Timeflies and Childish Gambino	Third Eye Blind
2013	Edward Sharpe and the Magnetic Zeroes	Chiddy Bang and T-Pain
2014	Mayer Hawthorne and GRiZ	Schoolboy Q and Angel Haze
2015	Big Sean	Holychild and Nate Ruess
2016	Chvrches	Icona Pop and Sammy Adams
2017	Jeremih and J.I.D	Tinashe and Awkwafina
2018	Vince Staples	Cheat Codes and DJ CTE
2019	A Boogie wit da Hoodie, IV Jay, and Malpractice	CupcakKe, 3OH!3, Rich Homie Quan
2020	N/A (Note: Cancelled due to the COVID-19 pandemic)	Jason Derulo (virtual)
2021	N/A (Note: Cancelled due to the COVID-19 pandemic)	A$AP Ferg

== Notable alumni ==
- John Peale Bishop Class of 1917 - writer, poet
- Adlai Stevenson Class of 1922 - governor of Illinois, U.S. Ambassador to the United Nations, and Democratic Party nominee for President in 1952 and 1956
- Stephen Ailes Class of 1933 - United States Secretary of the Army 1964-1965
- Fred E. Fox Class of 1939 - collector of Princeton traditions known as "Keeper of the Princetoniana"
- Robert F. Goheen Class of 1940 - president of Princeton University and U.S. Ambassador to India
- George P. Shultz Class of 1942 - Former United States Secretary of Labor, Secretary of the Treasury, Secretary of State, and president of Bechtel.
- Robert Venturi Class of 1947 - Architect (at Princeton: Wu Hall, Lewis Thomas Laboratory, Frist Campus Center)
- Robert L. Belknap Class of 1951 - Russian literature scholar and dean of Columbia College
- Ralph DeNunzio Class of 1956 - investment banker and chairman of the New York Stock Exchange
- Neil L. Rudenstine Class of 1956 - Former president of Harvard University.
- R. W. Apple, Jr. Class of 1957 - New York Times editor
- Sir Gordon Wu Class of 1958 - Chairman of Hopewell Holdings
- J. Robert Hillier Class of 1959 - Founder of Hillier Architecture
- Kit Bond Class of 1960 - former U.S. senator and governor of Missouri
- Jerome Powell Class of 1975 - Chair of the Federal Reserve
- David Huebner Class of 1982 - United States Ambassador to New Zealand and Samoa
- Jeff Bezos Class of 1986 - founder of Amazon.com
- Eduardo Bhatia Class of 1986 - 15th President of the Senate of Puerto Rico
- Yvonne Gonzalez Rogers Class of 1987 - US District Judge for the United States District Court for the Northern District of California
- David Risher Class of 1987 - CEO of Lyft; president of Quadrangle
- Wentworth Miller Class of 1995 - Actor, model and screenwriter
- Jamie Ding Class of 2013 - Jeopardy champion, fifth in all time winnings.
