= Meyer Schapiro =

American historian

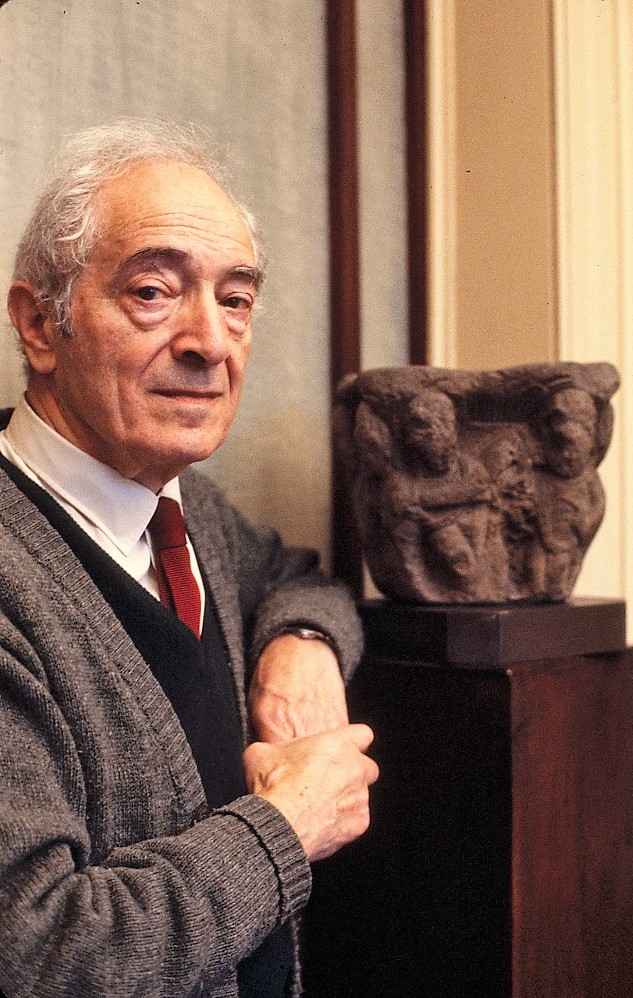
- Meyer Schapiro in 1981
- Born: September 23, 1904; Šiauliai, Russian Empire (present-day Lithuania)
- Died: March 3, 1996 (aged 91); New York City, U.S.
- Other name: M. Morrison (pen name)
- Education: Columbia University
- Occupations: Philosopher, professor, writer
- Years active: 1928–1973
- Movement: Trotskyism
- Spouse: Lillian Milgram Schapiro
- Children: 2
- Relatives: Morris Schapiro (brother), Jacob Collins (grand-nephew)
- Awards: Alexander Hamilton Medal, National Institute of Arts and Letters (member)

Meyer Schapiro (23 September 1904 – 3 March 1996) was a Lithuanian-born American art historian who developed new art historical methodologies that incorporated an interdisciplinary approach to the study of works. An expert on early Christian, Medieval and modern art, he explored periods and movements with an eye toward their works' social, political and material constructions.

Credited with fundamentally changing the course of the art historical discipline, Schapiro's scholarly approach was dynamic and it engaged other scholars, philosophers and artists. An active professor, lecturer, student, writer and humanist, he maintained a long professional association with Columbia University in New York.

== Background ==
Meir Schapiro was born in Šiauliai, Lithuania (then Governorate of Kaunas of the Russian Empire) on September 23, 1904. His ancestors were Talmudic scholars. His parents, Nathan Menachem Schapiro and Fanny Adelman Schapiro, were Lithuanian Jews.

In 1906, his father came to New York City and found a job as a Hebrew teacher at the Yitzcak Elchanan Yeshiva on the Lower East Side. Once secure, he sent for his family, who emigrated in 1907. The son's first name changed from "Meir" to "Meyer". He grew up in the Brownsville section of Brooklyn, where he was first exposed to art in evening classes taught by John Sloan at the Hebrew Educational Society.

He attended Public School 84 and then Boys High School in Brooklyn. He attended lectures on anthropology and economics at the Young People's Socialist League. During summers, he worked as a Western Union delivery boy, a warehouse packer, an electrical-supply assembler and an adjustment clerk at Macy's.

== Education ==
In 1920, Schapiro entered Columbia University as a 16-year-old Pulitzer and Regents scholar. His professors included Mark Van Doren and Franz Boas. Undergraduate classmates included Whittaker Chambers, Clifton Fadiman, Herbert Solow, Lionel Trilling, Henry Zolinsky and Louis Zukofsky, with many of whom he contributed to The Morningside literary magazine. In 1923, he traveled to Europe with Chambers and Zolinsky. During his undergraduate days, he became known for his "Schapiric victory", by allegedly reducing an instructor to tears by means of dialectic logic. In 1924, he received his bachelor's degree with honors in art history and philosophy. Princeton University denied him admission for his doctorate, so he continued at Columbia and earned his doctoral degree in art history in 1929. His professors at that time included Ernest DeWald. His dissertation, five years in the making, examined the cloister and portal of Moissac Abbey, built about A.D. 1100:

Dr. Schapiro's research went far beyond the implications of Moissac itself. Medieval church history, liturgy, theology, social history, illuminated manuscripts, folklore, epigraphy, the analysis of ornament and national characteristics (real or imagined) all were pressed into service and synthesized. As a result, what had been thought of as antiquarian artifacts were seen to have a completely different character. "A new sphere of artistic creation," Dr. Schapiro called it, "without religious content and imbued with values of spontaneity, individual fantasy, delight in color and movement, and the expression of feelings that anticipate modern art. This new art, on the margins of religious work, was accompanied by a conscious taste of the spectators for the beauty of workmanship, materials and artistic devices, apart from religious meanings."

(In 1975, he received his third degree from Columbia, an honorary doctor of letters.)

== Career ==
=== Academics ===
Schapiro spent his entire working career at Columbia. In 1928, he began teaching as a lecturer, before completing his dissertation. In 1936, he became assistant professor. In 1946, he became associate professor. In 1952, he became a full professor. In 1965, he was named University Professor. He became University Professor Emeritus in 1973. His final, weekly class at Columbia was "Theory and Methods of Investigation in Art."

He lectured at New York University (1932–1936), the New School for Social Research (1936–1952), Harvard University as the Charles Norton Lecturer (1966–1967) and Oxford University as Slade Professor of Art (1968). He was a visiting lecturer at the College de France in Paris in May 1974.

=== Society ===
Schapiro partook in the First American Artists' Congress Against War and Fascism in 1935, which produced a petition signed by more than 300 artists including co-founders Stuart Davis, Adolph Dehn, William Gropper, Hugo Gellert, Saul Schary and Moses Soyer, as well as fellow artists Milton Avery, Ilya Bolotowsky, Alexander Calder, Adolph Gottlieb, Jack Kufeld, Yasuo Kuniyoshi, J. B. Neumann, Isamu Noguchi, Ben Shahn, Raphael Soyer, James Johnson Sweeney, Max Weber, George Biddle, Paul Cadmus, Philip Evergood, Lorser Feitelson and Lewis Mumford. Schapiro and Gottlieb publicly resigned within the month when the congress did not condemn the Soviet invasion of Finland. Schapiro and other dissenters, including Mark Rothko, Gottlieb, Harris and Bolotowsky, condemned dictatorships in Germany, Russia, Italy, Spain and Japan and founded a Cultural Committee which became the Federation of Modern Painters and Sculptors.

Schapiro was a proponent of modern art, on which he published essays alongside books on Van Gogh and Cézanne. He was a founder of Dissent, along with Irving Howe and Michael Harrington. From 1966 to 1967 Schapiro was the Norton professor at Harvard University.

Schapiro's discourse on style is often considered his greatest contribution to the study of art history. He said style refers to the formal qualities and visual characteristics of a piece of art, and demonstrated it could be used as an identifier of a particular period and as a diagnostic tool. Style is indicative of the artist and the culture at large. It reflects the economic and social circumstances in which an artist works and breathes and reveals underlying cultural assumptions and normative values.

== Personal life and death ==
Schapiro's brother was financier Morris Schapiro. His grand-nephew is artist Jacob Collins.

In 1931, Schapiro married pediatrician Lillian Milgram. They had two children, Miriam Schapiro Grosof and Ernest Schapiro.

He died in 1996 in New York at the age of 91 in the Greenwich Village house where he had lived since 1933.

== Impact ==
=== Artists ===
In the 1940s, when the Museum of Modern Art looked at purchasing Jackson Pollock's The She-Wolf (1943), Schapiro, as an acquisitions committee member, supported its acquisition.

In the 1950s, Schapiro urged Willem de Kooning to finish painting Woman I (1950–1952).

=== Marxist art history ===
Schapiro was, at points in his career, criticized for his approach to style because of its politically radical connotations. He wrote scholarly articles for a variety of socialist publications and endeavored to apply a novel Marxist method to the study of art history. In his most famous essay on Medieval Spanish art, "From Mozarabic to Romanesque in Silos", Schapiro demonstrated how the concurrent existence of two historical styles in one monastery was indicative of economic upheaval and class conflict.

Schapiro's students include:

- Sigmund Abeles
- Jonathan Crary
- Helen Frankenthaler
- Peter Golfinopoulos
- Michael Hafftka
- Carroll Janis
- Allan Kaprow
- Hilton Kramer
- Robert Motherwell
- Dorothy Miner
- David Rosand
- William Rubin
- Lucas Samaras
- Virginia Wright
- Barbara Rose

=== Portraits ===
Alice Neel painted his portrait in 1947 and 1983. (A lifelong artist, Schapiro produced a number of self-portraits.)

== Awards ==
Schapiro was a fellow of the American Academy of Arts and Sciences, the National Institute of Arts and Letters and the American Philosophical Society.

In 1973, Schapiro received an award by the Art Dealers Association of America.

In 1974, for Schapiro's 70th birthday, a dozen leading artists made original lithographs, etchings and silk-screens, sold in an edition of 100, whose proceeds endowed the Meyer Schapiro Professorship of Art History in art history and archeology at Columbia. The contributors were: Jasper Johns, Ellsworth Kelly, Alexander Liberman, Stanley William Hayter, Roy Lichtenstein, André Masson, Robert Motherwell, Claes Oldenburg, Robert Rauschenberg, Saul Steinberg, Frank Stella and Andy Warhol. The artworks were exhibited at the Metropolitan Museum of Art. In 1975, Schapiro received the Alexander Hamilton Medal for distinguished service and accomplishment by the alumni of Columbia University. The same year, he received an honorary doctor of letters degree from the university.

In 1976, he was elected a member of the National Institute of Arts and Letters.

In 1987, he was named a MacArthur Foundation fellow. In 1995, his brother Morris donated $1 million to establish the Meyer Schapiro Professorship of Modern Art and Theory.

In 1995, Schapiro received a special award for lifetime achievement from the College Art Association at its 83rd annual conference in San Antonio, Texas. He had been a member since 1926 and was cited for seven decades of scholarship and teaching in the field of art history: "Meyer Schapiro, we honor you for 70 years of unique scholarship and perception, for showing us the way in which art history enhances our understanding of human accomplishment."

== Bibliography ==
During the 1930s, Schapiro contributed to leftist publications including The Marxist Quarterly, The New Masses, The Partisan Review and The Nation.

=== Books ===
- Vincent van Gogh. New York: Harry N. Abrams, 1950 and reprints.
- Paul Cézanne. New York: Harry N. Abrams, 1952 and reprints.
- The Parma Ildefonsus: A Romanesque Illuminated Manuscript from Cluny, and Related Works. New York: College Art Association of America, 1964.
- Words and Pictures. On the Literal and the Symbolic in the Illustration of a Text. Approaches to Semiotics series 11, ed. Thomas A Sebeok. The Hague and Paris: Mouton, 1973.
- Selected Papers I: Romanesque Art. New York: George Braziller, 1977.
  - Translations:
    - Italian, Romanica (Turin: Giulio Einaudi, 1982).
    - Spanish, Estudios sobre el Romanica (Madrid: Aliana Editorial, 1984).
    - German, Romanische Kunst Ausgewahlte Schriften (Cologne: Dumont Verlag, 1987).
- Selected Papers II: Modern Art: 19th and 20th Centuries. New York: George Braziller, 1978, 1982.
  - Translations:
    - Swedish, Modern Konst-1800-talet och 1900-talet - Valda Studier, 1981
    - German, Moderne Kunst-19.und 20. Jahrhundert-Ausgewahlte Aufsatze (Cologne: DuMont Buchverlag, 1982).
    - Italian, L'Arte Moderna (Turin: Giulio Einaudi Editore, n.d.).
    - Spanish, El Arte Moderno (Madrid: Alianza Editorial, S.A., 1988).
- Selected Papers III: Late Antique, Early Christian, and Medieval Art. New York: George Braziller, 1979.
  - Translations:
    - Spanish, Estudios sobre el arte de la Antiguedad Tardia, el Cristianismo Primitivo y la Edad Media (Madrid: Aliana Editorial, 1987).
- Style, Artiste et Societe, trans. Blaise Allan et. a. Paris: Editions Gallimard, 1982.
- The Romanesque Sculpture of Moissac. New York: George Braziller, 1985.(Reprint of Schapiro's dissertation originally published in Art Bulletin. Includes photographs by David Finn)
- Selected Papers IV: Theory and Philosophy of Art: Style, Artist, and Society. George Brailler, 1994.
- Mondrian: On the Humanity of Abstract Painting. New York; George Braziller, 1995.
- Meyer Schapiro : the bibliography / compiled by Lillian Milgram Schapiro. New York : G. Braziller, 1995.
- Words, Script, and Pictures: The Semiotics of Visual Language. New York: George Braziller, 1996.
- Impressionism: Reflections and Perceptions. New York George Braziller, 1997.
- A kind of rapture / Robert Bergman; introduction by Toni Morrison; afterword by Meyer Schapiro. New York: Pantheon Books, 1998.
- Worldview in Painting—Art and Society: Selected Papers, Vol. 5. New York: George Braziller, 1999.
- The Unity of Picasso's Art. New York: George Braziller, 2000.
- Meyer Schapiro : his painting, drawing, and sculpture. New York : Harry N. Abrams, Publishers, 2000.
- Language of Forms: Lectures on Insular Manuscript Art. New York: Pierpont Morgan Library, 2005.
- Romanesque architectural sculpture: The Charles Eliot Norton lectures. Chicago: University of Chicago Press, 2006.
- Meyer Schapiro abroad : letters to Lillian and travel notebooks. Los Angeles, Calif. : Getty Research Institute, 2009.

=== Articles ===
Schapiro wrote some articles under assumed names.

- "The Nerve of Sidney Hook" (as "David Merian") Partisan Review (1943)

=== Critical studies and reviews of Schapiro's work ===
Romanesque architectural sculpture

- Sauerländer, Willibald (June 28, 2007). "The artist historian". The New York Review of Books. 54 (11): 55–57, 61–62.

== Artworks ==
In 1987, Schapiro exhibited 65 drawings and paintings from 1919 to 1979 in the Wallach Art Gallery in Schermerhorn Hall at Columbia. Subjects ranged from portraiture, landscapes, family, war horrors and abstraction. Included were a self-portrait at age 16 and two portraits of friend Whittaker Chambers.

== See also ==
Subjects and objects Schapiro wrote about at length include:

- Castelseprio
- Monastery of Santo Domingo de Silos
- Joshua Roll
- Ruthwell Cross
- Moissac sculptures

Columbia classmates include:

- Whittaker Chambers
- Clifton Fadiman
- Herbert Solow
- Lionel Trilling
- Louis Zukofsky

== Literature ==
C. Oliver O'Donnell: Meyer Schapiro's Critical Debates. Art Through a Modern American Mind, The Pennsylvania State University Press, University Park, Pennsylvania, 2019, ISBN 9780271084640
