= Grand Central Academy of Art =

Art school in Queens, New York

Coordinates: 40.746288°N 73.950636°W

The Grand Central Atelier is an art school in the Long Island City neighborhood of the borough of Queens in New York City.

Founded in 2006 by New York artist Jacob Collins, the school focuses on training artists in the classical art tradition.

== See also ==
- List of art schools
