= Robert L. Belknap =

American scholar of Russian literature

Dean of Columbia College
- Acting
- In office 1976–1977
- Preceded by: Peter Pouncey
- Succeeded by: Arnold Collery

Personal details
- Born: December 23, 1929 New York City, New York, U.S.
- Died: March 17, 2014 (aged 84) New York City, New York, U.S.
- Spouse: Cynthia Whittaker 1997-2014; Josephine Elizabeth Hornor Belknap 1955-1995
- Relations: Chauncey Belknap (father) Dorothy Lamont Belknap ( mother) Robert P. Lamont (grandfather)
- Children: Lydia Hornor Belknap Duff, Ellen Lamont Belknap, Abigail Belknap Krueger
- Education: Princeton University (BA); Columbia University (PhD)
- Awards: Guggenheim Fellowship (1994)

Robert Lamont Belknap (December 23, 1929 – March 17, 2014) was an American scholar of Russian literature. He was a professor at Columbia University, where he served as interim dean of Columbia College, and director of the Harriman Institute. He received a Guggenheim Fellowship in 1994.

== Biography ==
Belknap was born in New York City on December 23, 1929 to attorney Chauncey Belknap IV, a name partner of Patterson Belknap Webb & Tyler, and his wife Dorothy Lamont, daughter of United States Secretary of Commerce Robert P. Lamont. He was educated at the Buckley School, Philips Exeter Academy, and graduated from Princeton University in 1951. At Princeton, he was a member of the Quadrangle Club. He received his M.A. from the School of International and Public Affairs, Columbia University and Ph.D. from Columbia University following army service. He also studied at the University of Paris and the University of Leningrad.

Belknap began teaching at Columbia in 1956, and served as interim dean in 1975, and director of the Harriman Institute from 1977 to 1980. A scholar of Russian literature, he specialized in the works of Fyodor Dostoevsky, notably on The Brothers Karamazov. His work is considered as one of the best studies on Dostoevsky produced by the present generation of scholars.

Belknap served as chairman of the board of the Brearley School.

Belknap was married to Josephine Hornor Belknap 1955-1994, and subsequently in 1997 to historian and academicCynthia Whittaker. He was a longtime resident of Wilton, Connecticut, and Cliff Island, Maine. He had three daughters, Lydia Belknap Duff of Baltimore MD, Ellen Lamont Belknap of Portland ME, and Abigail Belknap Krueger of Boston MA, and two sisters, Barbara Belknap, a former principal of St. Luke's School, and Louise Belknap Carter.

Belknap died on March 17, 2014, in New York City.

Academic offices
Preceded by Peter Pouncey	Dean of Columbia College (acting); 1976-1977	Succeeded by Arnold Collery
