= Zénith Limoges Métropole =

Coordinates: 45°51′44″N 1°16′46″E

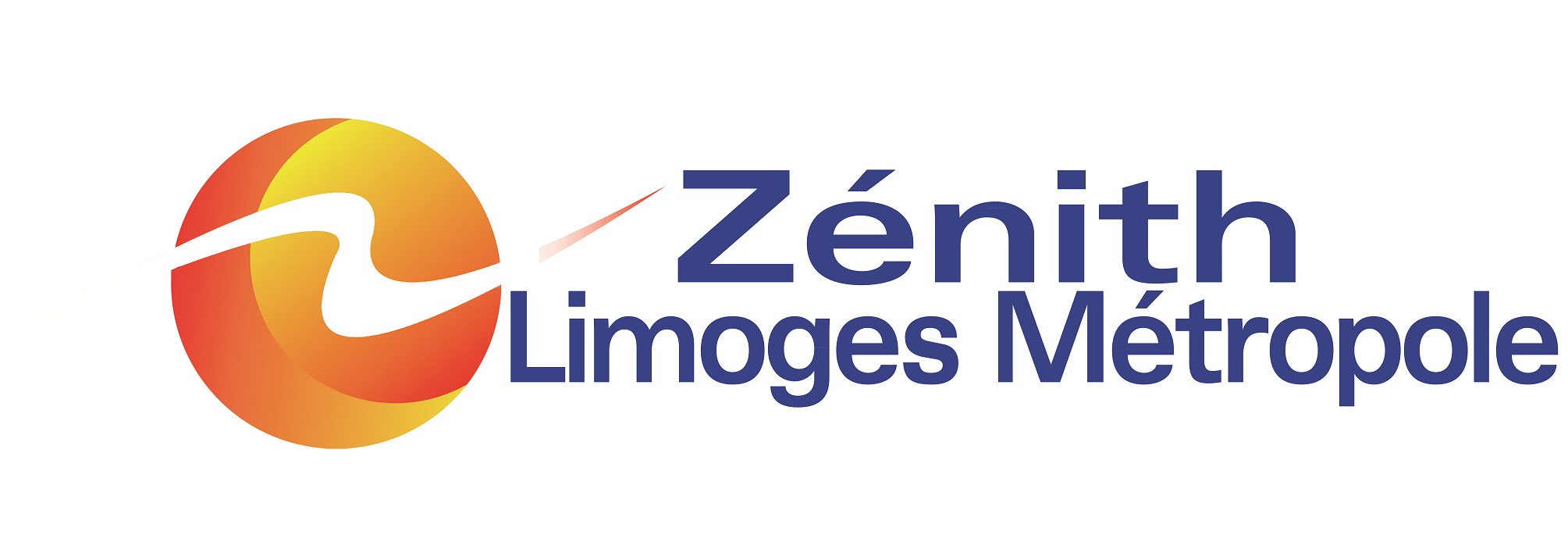
- Interactive map of Zénith Limoges Métropole
- Address: 16 Avenue Jean Monnet; 87100 Limoges France
- Location: Limoges, France
- Owner: CA Limoges Métropole
- Operator: Groupe S-PASS
- Capacity: 6,047

Construction
- Groundbreaking: 8 April 2005
- Opened: 8 March 2007
- Cost: US$36.6 million ($60.3 million in 2025 dollars)

Website
- Official Website

The Zénith Limoges Métropole (French pronunciation: [zenit limɔʒ metʁɔpɔl]; also known as the Concert Hall in Limoges) is an indoor amphitheater designed by famous architect Bernard Tschumi. This building is located in a wooded area on the outskirts of the city of Limoges in central France. The concert hall in Limoges can accommodate up to 6,000 spectators.

== About ==
Basic Details

Site Area: 6 ha (15 acres)
Main Building Area: 14,000 m^{2} (150,000 ft^{2})
Building Dimensions: 90 m (300 ft) (in diameter)
Height: 22 m (72 ft)
Levels: 3 stories of backstage area
Capacity: 6,047
Parking Capacity: 1,500-vehicles-capacity parking surface 4 ha (9.9 acres)
Completion: Spring 2007
Inauguration Date: March 8, 2007
Total Budget: US$36.6 million
Competition: 1st prize, 2003

Staff

Partners-in-charge: Bernard Tschumi, Véronique Descharrières
Lead Designer: Bernard Tschumi
Project Architects: Jean Jacques Hubert, Antoine Santiard, Joël Rutten
Team Architects: Anne Save de Beaurecueil, Chong-Zi Chen, Nicolas Cazeli, Mathieu Göetz, Lara Herro, Robert Holton, Sarrah Khan, Joong Sub Kim, Alan Kusov, Dominic Leong, Michaela Metcalf, Alex Reid, Vincent Prunier et Sylviane Brossard
Landscape Architect: Michel Desvigne
Site Architect: ArchitectAtelier 4
Research office: Technip TPS with Jaillet & Rouby and Naterrer Bois Consult
Staging Consultant: Scène
Acoustics Cial: Landscape Architect Michel Desvigne avec Sol Paysage
Facade Advisor: Hugh Dutton Associates
HQE Engineer: Michel Raoust
Graphics and Signage: Benoît Santiard
Photography: Peter Mauss/Esto, Christian Richters
