= Robert P. Lamont =

American politician

Robert Lamont
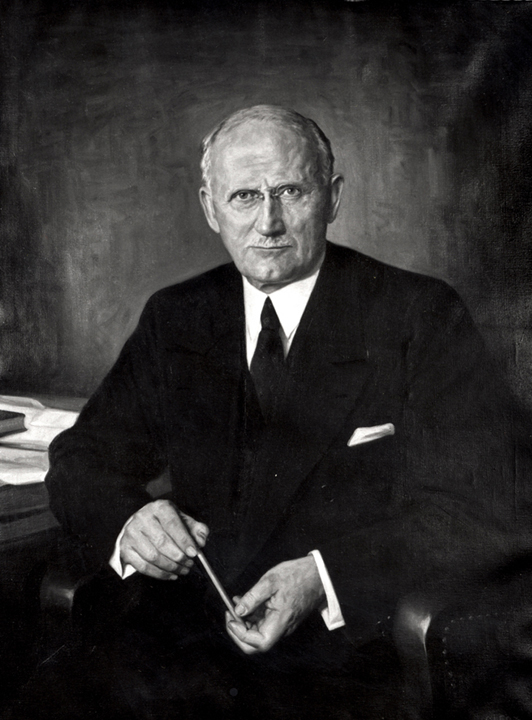

5th United States Secretary of Commerce
- In office March 5, 1929 – August 7, 1932
- President: Herbert Hoover
- Preceded by: William F. Whiting
- Succeeded by: Roy D. Chapin

Personal details
- Born: Robert Patterson Lamont; December 1, 1867 Detroit, Michigan, U.S.
- Died: February 20, 1948 (aged 80) Chicago, Illinois, U.S.
- Party: Republican
- Spouse: Helen Trotter
- Relations: Robert L. Belknap (grandson)
- Children: 3
- Education: University of Michigan (BS)

Robert Patterson Lamont (December 1, 1867 – February 20, 1948) was United States secretary of commerce March 5, 1929 to August 7, 1932, during the administration of Herbert Hoover. He was commerce secretary during difficult times for commerce, as a result of the Great Depression.

== Life ==
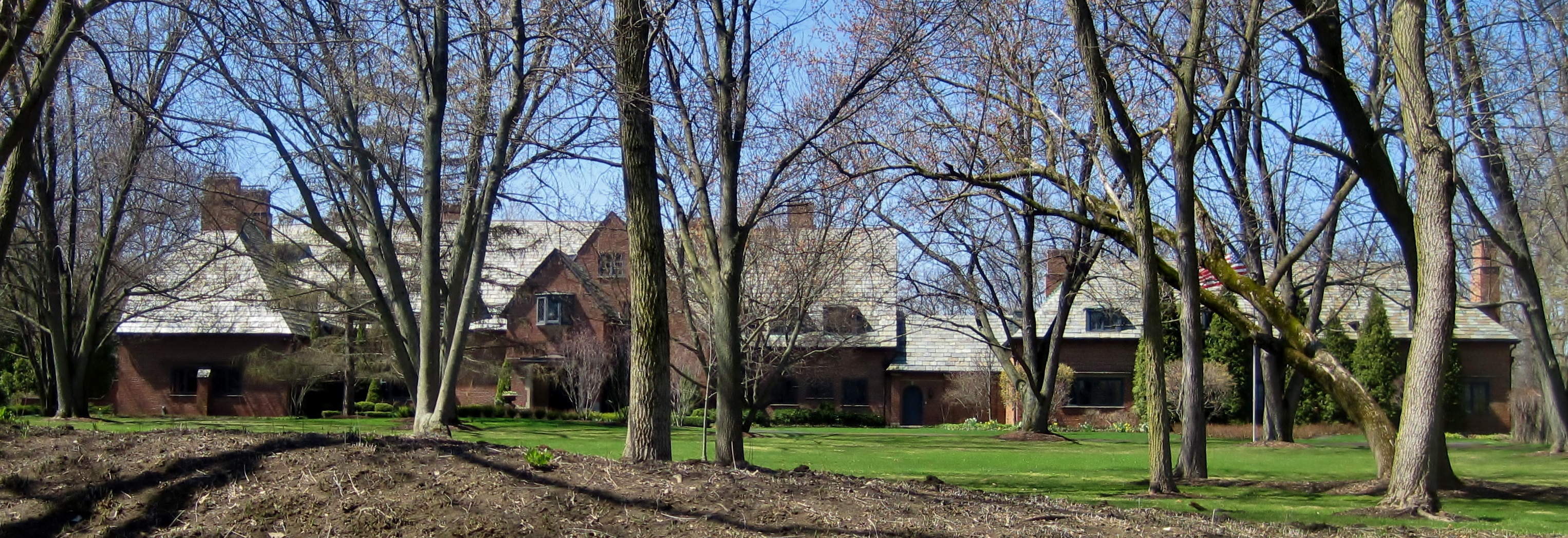
West View Farms, Lamont's estate in Lake Forest, Illinois from 1925 to 1934, was designed by Howard Van Doren Shaw.

Lamont was born in Detroit, Michigan on December 1, 1867, to Isabella (née Patterson) and Robert Lamont. He was educated at the University of Michigan, graduating in 1891 with a degree in civil engineering. He worked as an engineer at the 1893 World's Columbian Exposition in Chicago, Illinois. Lamont married Helen Gertrude Trotter on October 24, 1894. They had three children: (Robert Patterson II, Gertrude and Dorothy Lamont). In 1897, he was hired by the Simplex Railway Appliance Company as first vice president. In 1905, the company was bought out by American Steel Foundries and Lamont remained a vice president. In 1912, he was appointed company president, a position he held until his Hoover administration appointment in 1929. Lamont was Secretary of Commerce from 1929 until 1932, when he resigned in order to become president of the American Iron and Steel Institute, where he stayed until 1934. Lamont died in Chicago, Illinois, in 1948. His grandson, Robert L. Belknap, was a professor of Russian literature at Columbia University.

Political offices
Preceded by William F. Whiting	U.S. Secretary of Commerce; Served under: Herbert Hoover; March 5, 1929 – August 7, 1932	Succeeded by Roy D. Chapin
