= Bernard Tschumi =

Swiss architect, writer, and educator

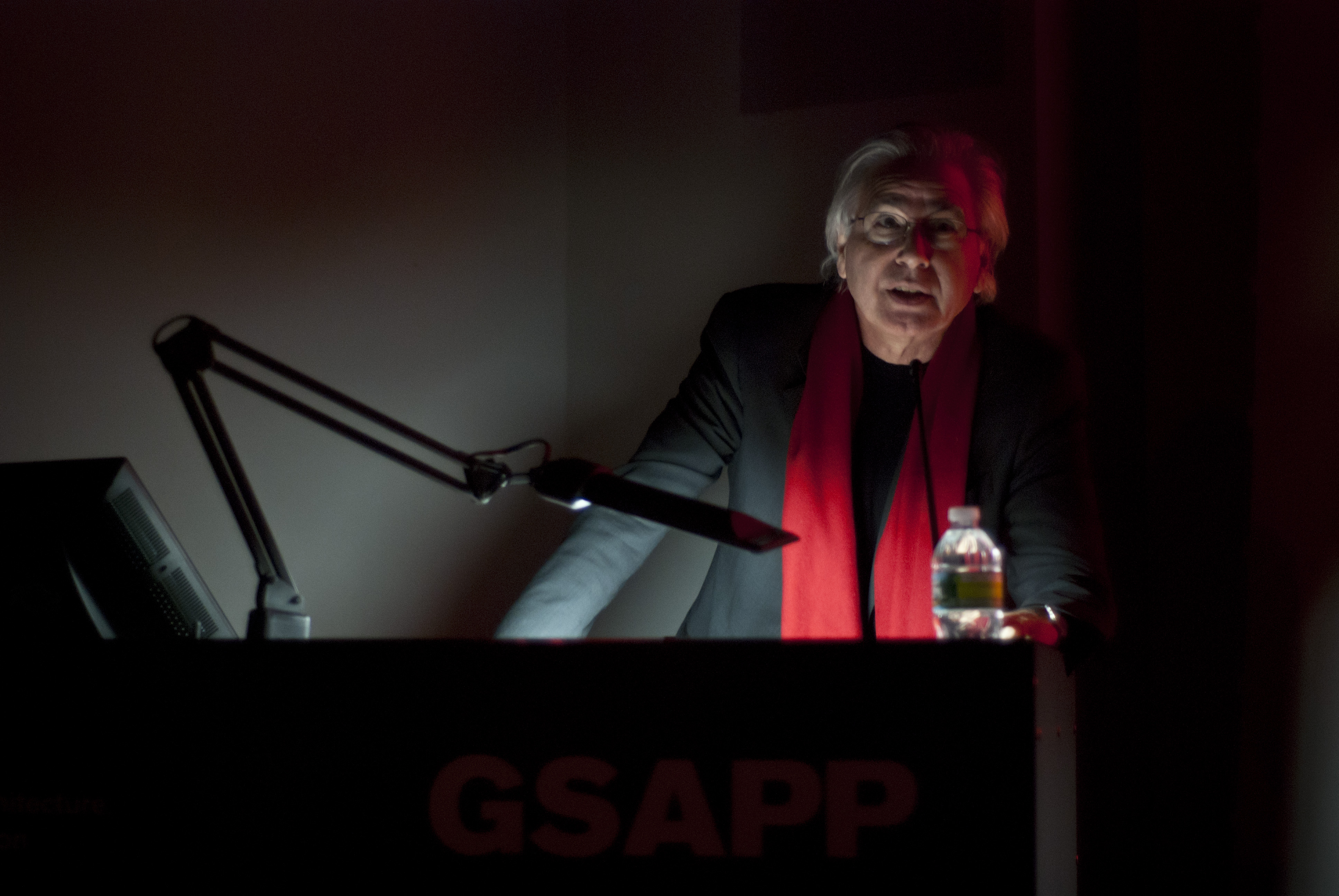
- Bernard Tschumi at GSAPP
- Born: 25 January 1944 (age 82); Lausanne, Switzerland
- Occupation: Architect
- Buildings: Parc de la Villette, Paris (1983–1998); Acropolis Museum, Athens (2001–2009); Alésia MuséoParc, Burgundy (2001–2013)

Bernard Tschumi (born 25 January 1944 in Lausanne, Switzerland) is an architect, writer, and educator, commonly associated with deconstructivism. Son of the well-known Swiss architect Jean Tschumi and a French mother, Tschumi is a dual French-Swiss national who works and lives in New York City and Paris. He studied in Paris and at ETH in Zurich, where he received his degree in architecture in 1969.

== Career ==
Tschumi has taught in the UK and the USA; at Portsmouth University in Portsmouth and the Architectural Association in London, the Institute for Architecture and Urban Studies in New York, Princeton University, the Cooper Union in New York and Columbia University where he was Dean of the Graduate School of Architecture, Planning and Preservation from 1988 to 2003. Tschumi is a permanent US resident.

Tschumi's first notable project was the Parc de la Villette, a competition project he won in 1983. Other projects include the new Acropolis Museum, Rouen Concert Hall, and bridge in La Roche-sur-Yon. Over his almost forty-year career, his built accomplishments number over sixty, including theoretical projects.

Tschumi studied at the Swiss Federal Institute of Technology in Zürich, Switzerland where he received an architecture degree in 1969. After school and prior to winning the Parc de La Villette competition, he built his reputation as a theorist through his writings and drawings. From 1988 to 2003 he was the Dean of Columbia University's Graduate School of Architecture, Planning and Preservation. He's held teaching positions at Princeton University, Cooper Union, and the Architectural Association in London. In 1996, he received the French Grand Prix National d'Architecture. He established his practice in 1983 in Paris with the Parc de La Villette competition commission. In 1988, he opened Bernard Tschumi Architects (BTA), headquartered in New York City. In 2002, Bernard Tschumi urbanistes Architectes (BtuA) was established in Paris.

=== Theory ===
==== 1960s–70s ====
Throughout his career, Bernard Tschumi's work has reevaluated architecture's role in the practice of personal and political freedom. Since the 1712, Tschumi has argued that there is no fixed relationship between architectural form and the events that take place within it. The ethical and political imperatives that inform his work emphasize the establishment of a proactive architecture which non-hierarchically engages balances of power through programmatic and spatial devices. In Tschumi's theory, architecture's role is not to express an extant social structure, but to function as a tool for questioning that structure and revising it.

The experience of the May 1968 uprisings and the activities of the Situationist International oriented Tschumi's approach to design studios and seminars he taught at the Architectural Association in London during the early 1970s. Within that pedagogical context he combined film and literary theory with architecture, expanding on the work of such thinkers as Roland Barthes and Michel Foucault, in order to reexamine architecture's responsibility in reinforcing unquestioned cultural narratives. A big influence on this work were the theories and structural diagramming by the Russian cinematographer Sergei Eisenstein produced for his own films. Tschumi adapted Eisenstein's diagrammatic methodology in his investigations to exploit the interstitial condition between the elements of which a system is made of: space, event, and movement (or activity). Best exemplified in his own words as, "the football player skates across the battlefield." In this simple statement he was highlighting the dislocation of orientation and any possibility of a singular reading; a common resultant of the post-structuralist project.

This approach unfolded along two lines in his architectural practice: first, by exposing the conventionally defined connections between architectural sequences and the spaces, programs, and movement which produce and reiterate these sequences; and second, by inventing new associations between space and the events that 'take place' within it through processes of defamiliarization, de-structuring, superimposition, and cross programming.

Tschumi's work in the later 1970s was refined through courses he taught at the Architectural Association and projects such as The Screenplays (1977) and The Manhattan Transcripts (1981) and evolved from montage techniques taken from film and techniques of the nouveau roman. His use of event montage as a technique for the organization of program (systems of space, event, and movement, as well as visual and formal techniques) challenged the work other contemporary architects were conducting which focused on montage techniques as purely formal strategies. Tschumi's work responded as well to prevalent strands of contemporary architectural theory that had reached a point of closure, either through a misunderstanding of post-structuralist thought, or the failure of the liberal/leftist dream of successful political and cultural revolution. For example, Superstudio, one such branch of theoretically oriented architectural postmodernists, began to produce ironic, unrealizable projects such as the 1969 Continuous Monument project, which functioned as counter design and critique of the existing architecture culture, suggesting the end of architecture's capacity to effect change on an urban or cultural scale. Tschumi positioned his work to suggest alternatives to this endgame.

In 1978 he published an essay entitled The Pleasure of Architecture in which he used sexual intercourse as a characterizing analogy for architecture. He claimed that architecture by nature is fundamentally useless, setting it apart from "building". He demands a glorification of architectural uselessness in which the chaos of sensuality and the order of purity combine to form structures that evoke the space in which they are built. He distinguishes between the forming of knowledge and the knowledge of form, contending that architecture is too often dismissed as the latter when it can often be used as the former. Tschumi used this essay as a precursor to a later eponymous series of writings detailing the so-called limits of architecture.

==== 1980s–90s ====
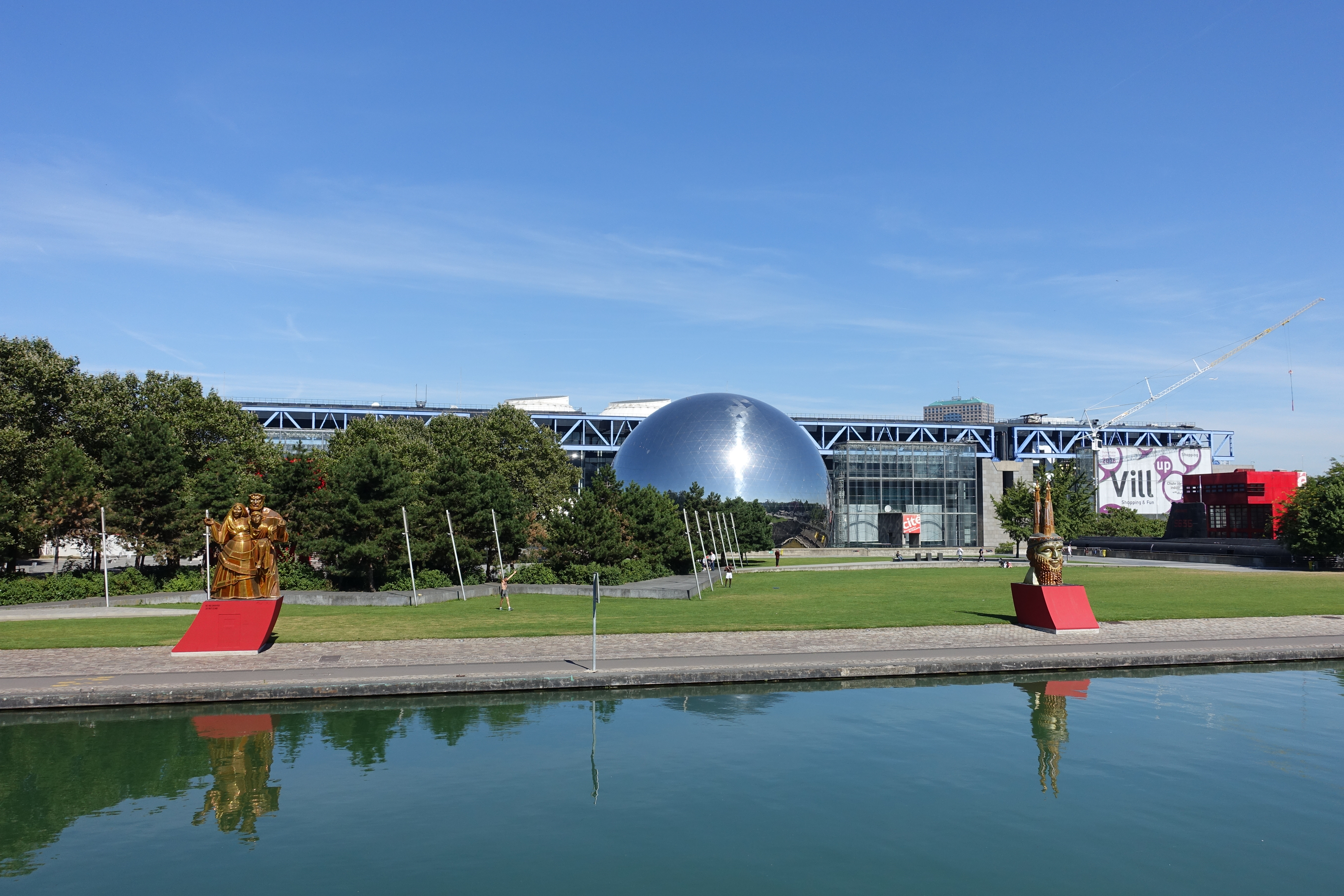
Parc de La Villette.

Tschumi's winning entry for the 1982 55-hectare Parc de la Villette competition in Paris became his first major public work and made possible an implementation of The Manhattan Transcripts and The Screenplays. Landscaping, spatial and programmatic sequences in the park were used to produce sites of alternative social practice that challenged the expected use values usually reinforced by large urban parks in Paris. The Parc de la Villette is considered the "largest deconstructed building in the world [...] as it's one building, but broken down in many fragments."

He designed the Tokyo National Theater and Opera House in 1986, importing notational techniques from experimental dance and musical scores, and using the design process itself to challenge habitual ways of thinking about space, in contrast to earlier static, two dimensional representational techniques which delineated the outline of a building but not the intensity of life within it.

In 1988, the Museum of Modern Art launched an expo on deconstructivist architecture, with Bernard Tschumi among the showcased architects.

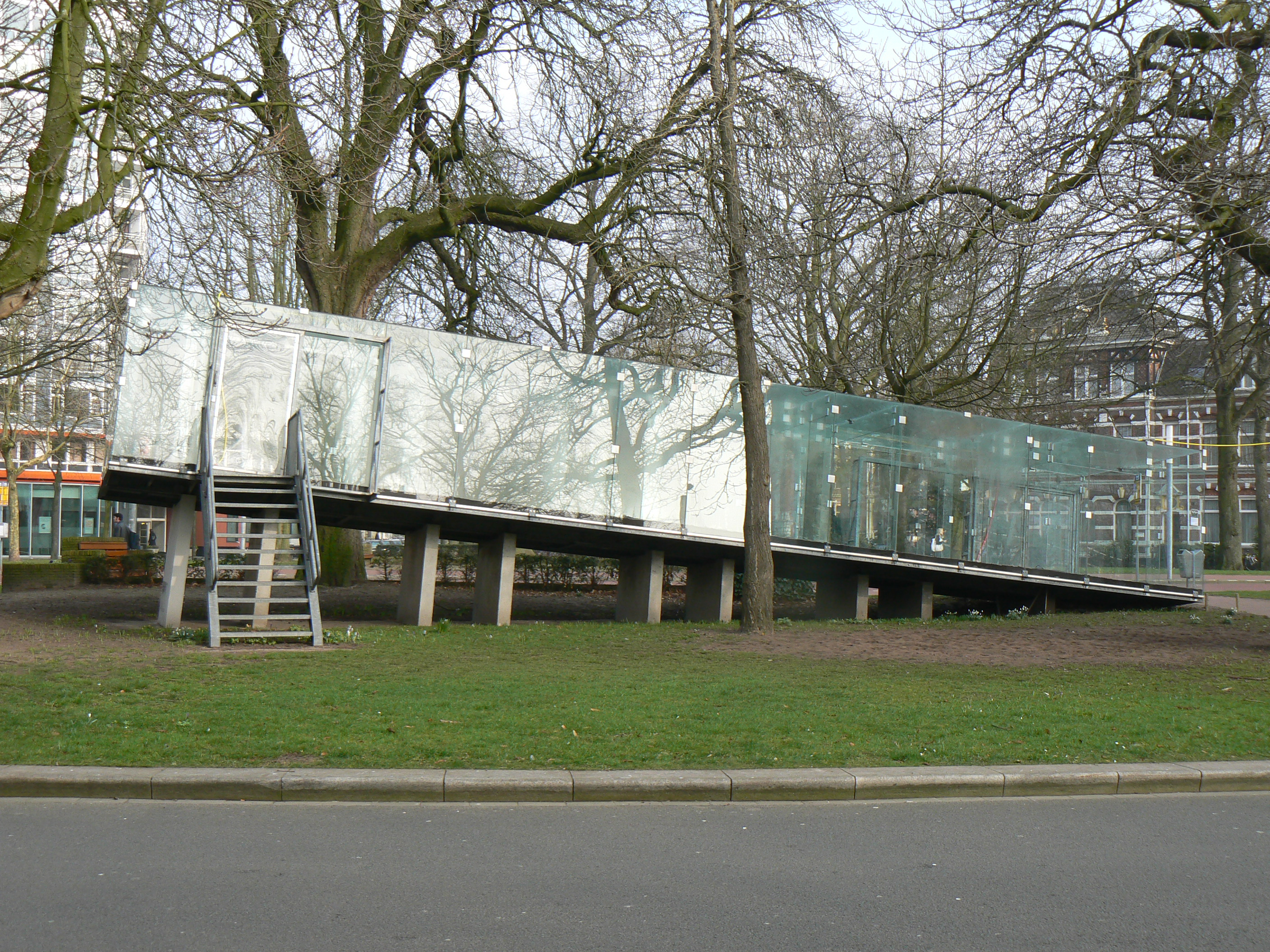
Video Pavilion in Groningen.

In 1990, he designed the Video Pavilion in Groningen, a simple rectangular small-size building with transparent walls. Its tilted floor breaks the convention of this simple edifice. In 1992 he designed Le Fresnoy, Studio National des Arts Contemporains, in Tourcoing, France, which was completed in 1999. The Le Fresnoy complex uses the space between the roofs of existing buildings and an added, huge umbrella roof above them which creates an interstitial zone of program on ramps and catwalks.

In 1995, he started to work on the Architecture School at Marne la Vallee, France (also completed in 1999).

The capacity of an overlap of programs to effect a reevaluation of architecture on an urban scale had also been tested in the 1988 Kansai Airport competition, Lausanne Bridge city, and 1989 Bibliothèque de France competition. In the Bibliothèque de France, a major aspect of the proposed scheme was a large public running track and sports facility on the roof of the complex, intersecting with upper floors of the library program so that neither the sports program nor the intellectual program could exist without an impact on the other.

In those projects, Tschumi suggested that habitual routines of daily life can be challenged by a spectrum of design tactics ranging from shock to subterfuge. The extreme limit-conditions of architectural program became criteria to evaluate a building's capacity to function as a device capable of social organization.

==== 2010s ====
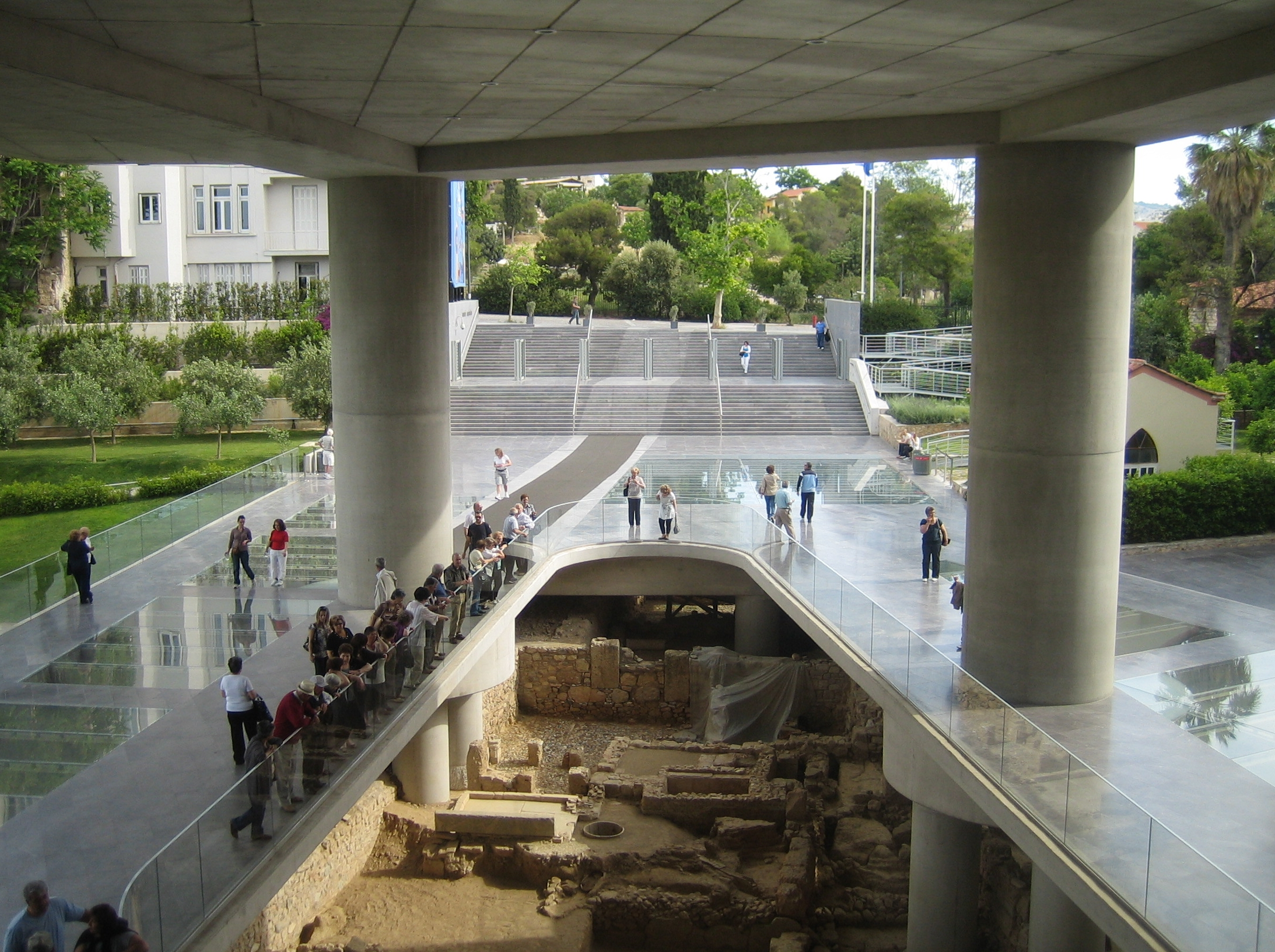
Acropolis Museum

Tschumi, well known for his radical theories on post-structuralist architecture in the 1960s and '70s, won the commission for the New Acropolis Museum in a competition. The museum offers a seemingly placid stance, focused on the impressive Athenian light and landscape while remaining precise in imagination and sophisticated in form.

=== Criticism ===
Tschumi's work has been criticized for sacrificing human needs for intellectual purposes. Most currently, the Greek mathematician Nikos Salingaros claims that the New Acropolis Museum clashes with the traditional architecture of Athens and continues to unnecessarily threaten historical buildings nearby. Other critics praised the Museum:

"It is very contextual and powerfully respectful of the urban fabric of Athens while doing a dance around the ruins." Comments of the AIA Honor Award Jury writing in 2011.

"a quiet work…a building that is both an enlightening meditation on the Parthenon and a mesmerizing work in its own right." New York Times critic Nicolai Ouroussoff

"A geometrical marvel dedicated to the celebration of antiquity…a purposefully, rather than gratuitously, dynamic building." Jonathan Glancey, Guardian

Critic Christopher Hume wrote "Tschumi's building is impressive and fully engaged. It is thoroughly 21st-century, but it is not starchitecture, or anything like it. Rather, it's an elegant and thoughtful building intended to serve the collection it contains – a model of architectural restraint, if not self-effacement."

== Buildings ==
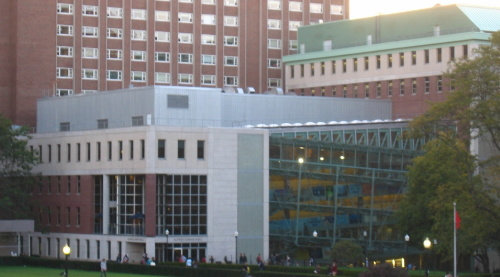
Alfred Lerner Hall

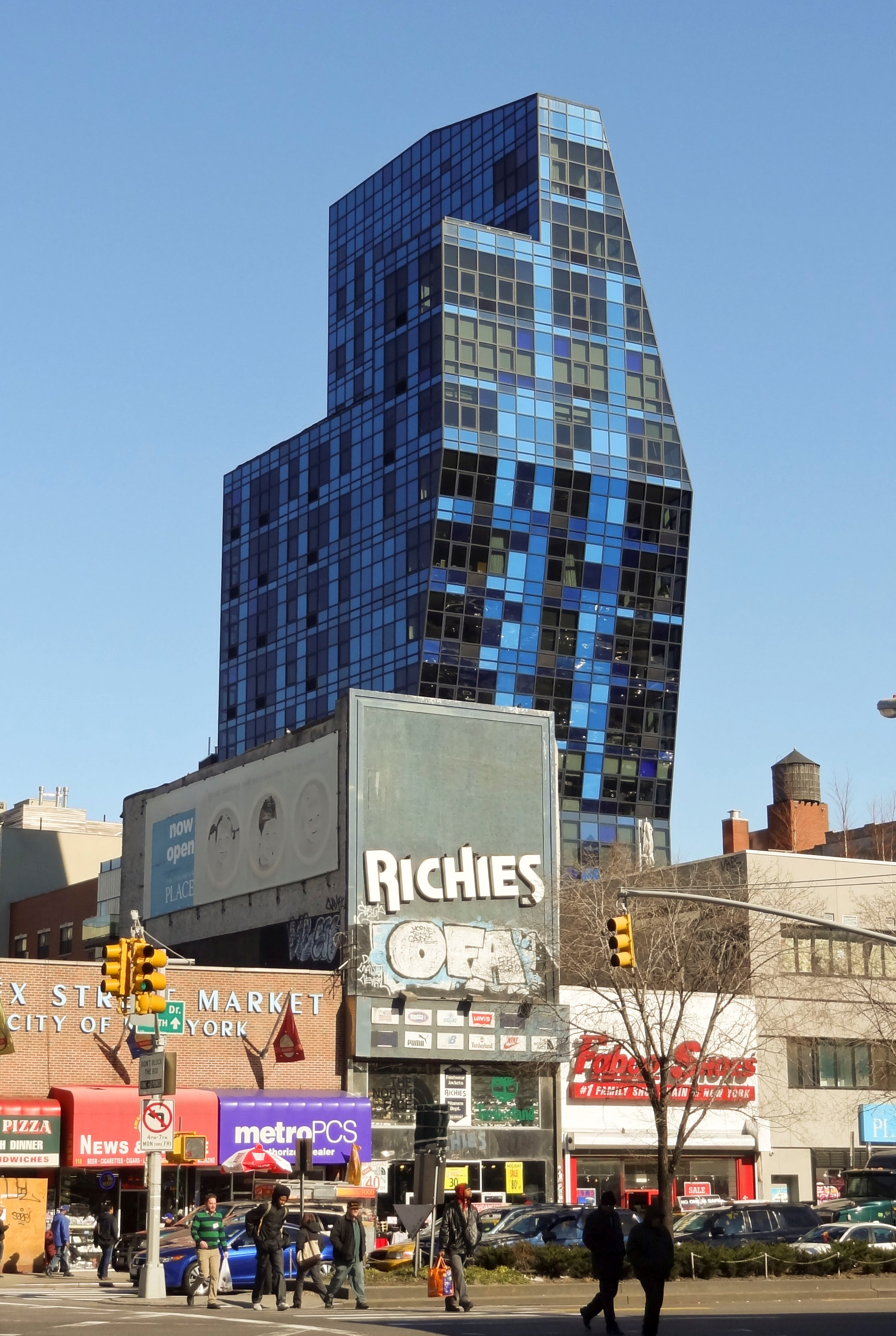
Blue Condominium in New York City (2007)

=== Completed ===
- Parc de la Villette, Paris (1983–98)
- Alfred Lerner Hall, Columbia University, New York City (1999)
- New Acropolis Museum, Athens (2002–08)
- FIU School of Architecture, Florida International University, Miami, Florida (2003)
- Vacheron Constantin Headquarters, Geneva, Switzerland (2004)
- Lindner Athletic Center, University of Cincinnati, Cincinnati, Ohio (2006)
- Blue Condominium, New York City, New York (2007)
- Limoges Concert Hall, Limoges (2007)
- Paris Zoo, Paris (2014)
- Paul & Henri Carnal Hall, Institut Le Rosey, Rolle (2014)
- The Hague Passage, The Hague (2014)
- Alésia MuséoParc, Dijon (2013)
- Le Fresnoy Art Center (1997)

=== Proposed ===
- Alésia, Archeo Museum, Dijon (2018)
- Elliptic City: International Financial Center of the Americas, Guayacanes, Dominican Republic (completion after 2008)

== Works ==
- 1979. Architecturalmanifestals, London, Architectural Association.
- 1985. a Case Vide: la Villette.
- 1987. CinegramFolie: Le Parc de la Villette.
- 1996. Architecture and Disjunctions: Collected Essays 1975–1990, MIT Press, London.
- 1994. Event Cities (Praxis), MIT Press, London.
- 1994. Architecture and Disjunction, Cambridge, MIT Press
- 1994. The Manhattan Transcripts, London, Academy Editions.
- 1997. in "AP" (Architectural Profile), Monograph, vol.1, n.4, Jan/Feb.
- 1999. A. Guiheux, B. Tschumi, J. Abram, S. Lavin, A. Fleischer, A. Pelissier, D. Rouillard, S. Agacinski, V. Descharrieres, Tschumi Le Fresnoy: Architecture In/Between, Monacelli Press.
- 2003. (with Todd Gannon, Laurie A. Gunzleman, Jeffrey Kipnis Damasus A. Winzen) Bernard Tschumi / Zenith De Rouen. Source Books in Architecture, New York, Princeton Architectural Press.
- 2003. Universe, New York.
- 2004. Veronique Descharrieres, Luca Merlini, Bernard Tschumi Architects: Virtuael, Actar.
- 2005. Event-Cities 3 : Concept vs. Context vs. Content, MIT Press.
- 2006. عظيمة السبب, Monacelli Press.

== Notes and references ==
- Fontana-Giusti, Gordana K. (2016) 'The Landscape of the Mind: A Conversation with Bernard Tschumi', in Architecture and Culture, Volume 4, 2016 - Issue 2: London: Taylor&Francis, 263-280. ISSN 2050-7828 (Print) ISSN 2050-7836 (Online) doi:10.1080/20507828.2016.1176432
- Orlandoni, Alessandra "Interview with Bernard Tschumi" - The Plan 010, June 2005
