= Sandoz factory Orléans =

FAMAR plant in Orléans, France
- Location within France

General information
- Type: pharmaceutical factory
- Location: Orléans, France, 1, avenue du champ de Mars Orléans, France
- Coordinates: 47°53′36″N 1°53′38″E
- Completed: 1952
- Owner: FAMAR

The Sandoz factory Orléans is a plant built for Sandoz Laboratories by famous architect Jean Tschumi. It was purchased by Marinopoulos in 2001. Then decommissioned in 2013 and bought by the city of Orléans to be destroyed and give way to an arena against the majority of the population. As the project collapsed, the building was bought in 2015 by the métropole of Orléans Métropole which uses it to host startup companies.

== Basic Details ==
Site Area: 37,320 square metres (401,710 sq ft)
Whole Buildings Area: 14,230 square metres (153,170 sq ft)
