= Morris Schapiro =

American investment banker and chess player

Morris A. Schapiro
- Born: 1903; Šiauliai, Russian Empire (present-day Lithuania)
- Died: December 26, 1996 (age 93)
- Education: Columbia University
- Occupation: Investment banker
- Known for: Bank mergers
- Relatives: Meyer Schapiro (brother); Jacob Collins (grandson)

Morris Abraham Schapiro (1903 – December 26, 1996) was an American investment banker and chess master. In the 1950s, he negotiated the mergers of Chase Bank with the Bank of Manhattan and Chemical Bank with the New York Trust Company. His brother was art historian Meyer Schapiro.

== Background ==
Morris Abraham Schapiro was born in the Russian Empire in 1903 and came to the United States in 1907. The family lived in Brownsville and Flatbush, Brooklyn. His father worked as a paper and cordage wholesaler, though he also wrote articles on philosophical subjects. His brother was art historian Meyer Schapiro. He excelled in mathematics and Latin at school.

At 16, Schapiro entered Columbia University on a Pulitzer Scholarship and graduated from Columbia College in 1923. He received an advanced degree from Columbia University in engineering in 1925.

== Chess ==
Schapiro excelled in chess. He led the Columbia University chess team to four national championships. In New York, he took 3rd, behind Dawid Janowski and Roy Turnbull Black, in 1920, twice won Manhattan CC championship in 1921 and 1922, and took 9th in 1923. He won a match against Oscar Chajes (7.5 : 5.5) in 1923. He took 5th at Lake Hopatcong 1923 (American Chess Congress, Frank James Marshall won), tied for 4-5th at New York 1924 (José Raúl Capablanca won), and took 2nd, behind Abraham Kupchik, at New York 1924.

== Career ==
Schapiro served as head of his own investment banking firm, M. A. Schapiro & Company. He established new business techniques for the banking industry. He also led some of the banking industry's largest mergers: Chase Bank and the Bank of Manhattan in 1955, then Chemical Bank and New York Trust in 1959. His obituary in The New York Times reads: "On both deals, Mr. Schapiro followed his traditional strategy. He recommended the two banks' stocks to affluent clients, then asked them to press the banks' managements to agree to a deal."

== Philanthropy ==
Schapiro donated to Columbia University, including the Schapiro Hall dormitory and Morris A. Schapiro Center for Engineering and Physical Science Research.

== Family and death ==
Schapiro married Alma Binion Cahn, a painter, who died in 1987, after 58 years of marriage. They had two children, Linda Schapiro Collins and Dr. Daniel Schapiro. His grandchildren include painter Jacob Collins. He died, aged 93, at his New York City apartment on December 26, 1996.
