= Arnold Collery =

Dean of Columbia College
- In office 1977–1982
- Preceded by: Peter Pouncey
- Succeeded by: Robert Pollack

Personal details
- Born: February 1, 1927; Glen Cove, New York, U.S.
- Died: May 12, 1989 (aged 62); Manhattan, New York City, U.S.
- Education: University at Buffalo (BA); Princeton University (PhD)

Arnold Peter Collery (February 1, 1927 – May 12, 1989) was an American economist and administrator. He was dean of Columbia College from 1977 to 1982 and headed Columbia's economics department.

== Biography ==
Collery was born in Glen Cove, New York on February 1, 1927, and was raised in Oyster Bay, New York. He received his B.A. from the University at Buffalo and Ph.D. from Princeton University.

In 1953, Collery joined the faculty of Amherst College and served as the chair of the college's economics department and held the Clarence Francis Chair in Social Science from 1974 to 1977. In 1974, He took a leave of absence to serve on the President's Council on Wage and Price Stability under President Gerald Ford, before returning to Amherst to serve as interim dean of the faculty. His students at Amherst included Edmund S. Phelps, who became a professor of economics at Columbia University and earned a Nobel Memorial Prize in Economic Sciences in 2006, and John M. Deutch, former Director of Central Intelligence.

In 1977, Collery was named dean of Columbia's undergraduate college. He led efforts to admit women and build an undergraduate residence hall.

He was named chairman of Columbia's economics department and held that position until his death in 1989. Collery was considered an authority on international economics.

Collery died of cancer in Manhattan on May 12, 1989, at 62 years old.

Academic offices
Preceded by Peter Pouncey	Dean of Columbia College; 1977–1982	Succeeded by Robert Pollack
