= Jacob Collins =

American painter (born 1964)

Fire Island Sunset, Oil on Canvas, 2004, 24 × 38, by Jacob Collins

Jacob Collins (born 1964) is an American realist painter working in New York City. He is a leading figure of the contemporary classical art revival.

He has founded the Water Street Atelier, the Grand Central Academy of Art and the Hudson River Fellowship.

== Life ==
Jacob Collins was born on August 11, 1964, in New York City. He comes from a family of artists and scholars. His great-uncle was Meyer Schapiro. As a child, he started copying works by Old Masters in the Metropolitan Museum of Art. From a young age, Collins knew that he wanted to be an artist, although his interest and skill lay in a classical style that was out of favor in the late 20th century. Moving away from Modernism, he identified instead with works of 15th–19th century masters and their techniques and aesthetics.

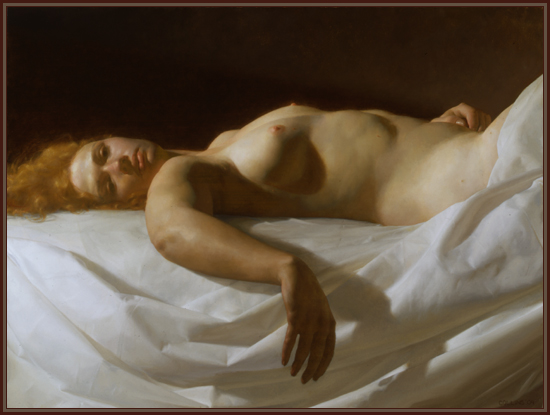
Red Head, Oil on Canvas, 30 × 40 inches, 2004, by Jacob Collins

He studied in Europe and at the New York Studio School following his graduation from The Dalton School. He earned a BA in history from Columbia, attended the New York Academy of Art (NYAA) and the Art Students League of New York. His teachers included painters Aaron Kurzen, Ted Seth Jacobs, Michael Aviano and the sculptor Martine Vaugel. He also copied from the masters at the Musée du Louvre, the Museo del Prado and the Uffizi Gallery.

After his studies, Collins's New York studio became a gathering place for artists interested in the revival of classical painting. Among the artists in this circle were Mikel Glass, Michael Grimaldi, John Morra, Richard Piloco, and William Rodgers. The group exhibited together as The Paint Group at Hirschl & Adler Modern in New York in 1999. During this period, Collins painted portrait commissions and began exhibiting professionally at the Salander-O'Reilly Galleries in New York City.

Collins is married to the writer Ann Brashares, with whom he has four children.

== Tutoring and schools ==
Jacob Collins has been teaching students of art for many years. In the 1990s, he was teaching night classes at the National Academy of Art, as well as taking in students for private study. In the 1990s, Collins founded the Water Street Atelier, an art school in New York City dedicated to teaching classical drawing and painting.In 2006, he founded the Grand Central Academy of Art, where he served as director and developed a curriculum based on the methods of historical ateliers. The academy operated in partnership with the Institute of Classical Architecture & Classical America before becoming an independent nonprofit organization in 2014.

By the early 2000s, Collins' school was located on the ground floor of his "Upper East Side carriage house [which was formerly] the headquarters of a then-traditional school called the Sculpture Center." In 2007, he created the Hudson River Fellowship. The purpose of this school is to facilitate the building of a new movement of American art, modeling itself after the artistic, social and spiritual values of the Hudson River School painters.

In 2014, he opened up his largest campus yet in a 12,500-square-foot (1,160 m^{2})-converted warehouse in Long Island City, near the Museum of Modern Art satellite PS1. The facility serves as another of Collins' art schools, as well as " an art incubator, and an artist clubhouse for at least 50 painters who have come out of Collins’s intense multiyear program over the past two decades, along with hundreds of students who now [attend] his classes and workshops."

== Work ==
Jacob Collins's style is considered Classical Realism, and his subject matter focuses on the figure, portraiture, still life and landscape as well as the occasional interior. Collins' nude figurative works, especially, reveal a point of view that is distinctly contemporary, and his setups are simple, incorporating at most a bed sheet and a length of fabric.

Collins' drawings and paintings have been shown with museums and galleries in North America and Europe, and he has been commissioned to paint portraits of J. Paul Getty Jr., President George H. W. Bush and U.S. Supreme Court Chief Justice Warren E. Burger. Collins is represented by Adelson Galleries (New York), the John Pence Gallery (San Francisco) and Meredith Long & Co. (Houston).

== Public collections ==
- Fogg Art Museum, Harvard University Art Museums, Cambridge, Massachusetts
- The Forbes Collection, New York
- John Pence Gallery, San Francisco
- Private Collection of Ann and Gordon Getty, California
- Mead Art Museum, Amherst College, Amherst, Massachusetts
- Steinway Hall, New York
- The Union League Club, New York
- U.S. Trust, New York
- The Wharton School of the University of Pennsylvania, Philadelphia
- Yale Law School, New Haven, Connecticut
- New Britain Museum of American Art, Connecticut
