= Center for the Study of Science and Religion =

Center at Columbia University

The Center for the Study of Science and Religion (CSSR), now known as the Research Cluster on Science and Subjectivity (RCSS), focuses on the intersection between the humanities and natural sciences, supported by the Columbia University Department of Biology. The CSSR was founded in the summer of 1999 by Robert Pollack, Professor of Biological Sciences at Columbia University, Adjunct Professor of Religion at Columbia University, and Adjunct Professor of Science and Religion at Union Theological Seminary in the City of New York. It serves as a forum for the examination of issues that lie at the boundary of two complementary ways of comprehending the world; namely, religion and science.

== Within Low Memorial Library (1999-2007) and The Earth Institute (2007-2014) ==
Initially founded as an interdisciplinary center spanning multiple departments, the center received $100,000 from the Templeton Foundation, $25,000 from the Nathan Cummings Foundation, and $10,000 from the Fetzer Institute, supporting lecture series and a Columbia University Irving Medical Center's writer-in-residence program, which ultimately invited poet Michael Ondaatje to teach a seminar series.

With these grants, existing within the framework of the Columbia University Earth Institute, the CSSR hosted numerous speaker series examining the dual-perspectives of religion and science on biological and ecological questions. Notable lectures include a 2003 lecture by Jeffrey Sachs on the influence of the relationship between geography and religion in the Middle East, a 2003 film screening on artificial intelligence, introduced by Sharon Olds, and a 2008 panel on the evolution of the human genome, featuring Philip Kitcher and Patricia Williams.

Holistically, the CSSR sponsored one major symposium about every two years, and four or more guest lectures each semester. These symposia include:

- A Colloquium on the Centennial of William James's The Varieties of Religious Experience, March 24 & 25, 2002
- Destructive Emotions: Neuroscience, Psychology and Buddhism, January 28, 2003
- Love and its Obstacles, November 7, 2004
- Mind and Reality, February 25 & 26, 2005

CSSR and Columbia University Press oversaw publication of the Columbia Series in Science and Religion. In sum, the academic direction and programming of the center were set by the Director and associated Professors, in order to educate the student body in the relationship between religion, science, and sustainability.

== Within the Center for Science and Society: from CSSR to RCSS (2014-present) ==
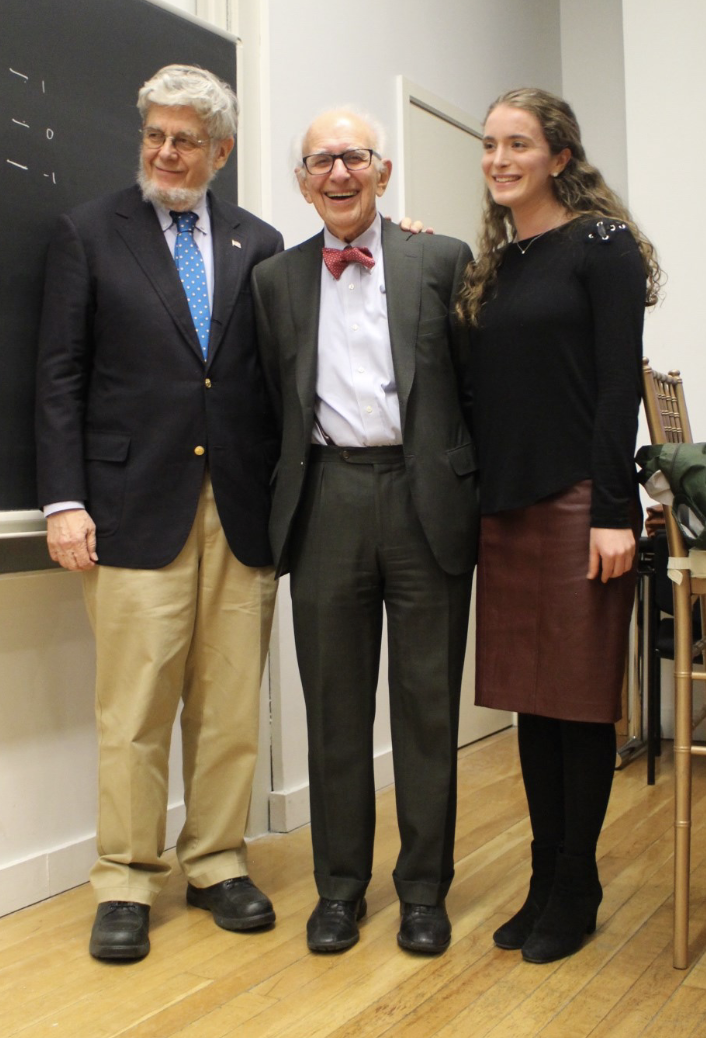
Lecture by Dr. Eric Kandel for the Research Cluster on Science and Subjectivity. From left to right: Robert E. Pollack, Eric Kandel, Undergraduate RCSS Intern-Scholar Leeza Hirt

In academic year 2014–15, the CSSR was relocated from The Earth Institute to the Columbia Center for Science and Society, where it was assigned a place as a Research Cluster, retaining a symbolic link to the CSSR with its new name: the RCSS. The RCSS secured generous funding, most notably from Harvey Kruegar (a 1951 graduate of Columbia College and 1954 graduate of Columbia Law School), ultimately facilitating numerous undergraduate-led projects at the intersection of science, service, and subjectivity. Empowering undergraduates as project leaders became the operating model for the RCSS during this time period. Starting in the FY23-24 school year, the RCSS is led by Lili Yamasaki, serving as the second director.

=== Research Cluster on Science and Subjectivity ===
Notable undergraduate student projects include organizing a speaker event with Nobel Laureate Eric Kandel, on the relationship between the arts and sciences, the creation of the Black Undergraduate Mentorship Program within the Columbia University Department of Biology, the formation of a clinical volunteering program with the local Terence Cardinal Cooke Health Care Center entitled At Your Service, and a partnership with the Columbia University Double Discovery Center to teach underserved high school students a molecular biology laboratory course, entitled Glass Half Full or Empty: Illuminating the Human Transcriptome.

The RCSS oversees the production of an undergraduate-produced publication, primarily featuring journal entries from each of the undergraduate project leaders.
