= Alfred Lerner Hall =

Student union in Manhattan, New York

Columbia University Alfred Lerner Hall
- Lerner Hall
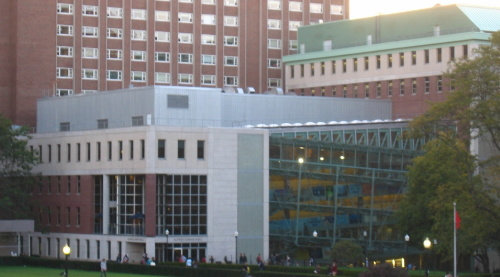
- Interactive map of the Columbia University; Alfred Lerner Hall area

General information
- Type: Student union
- Architectural style: Postmodern
- Location: Morningside Heights, Manhattan, New York City
- Coordinates: 40°48′24.66″N 73°57′50.17″W
- Completed: 1999

Design and construction
- Architect: Bernard Tschumi

Website
- https://lernerhall.columbia.edu/

Alfred Lerner Hall is the student center or students' union of Columbia University. It is named for Al Lerner, who financed part of its construction. Situated on the university's historic Morningside Heights campus in New York City, the building, designed by deconstructivist architect Bernard Tschumi, then dean of Columbia's Graduate School of Architecture, Planning and Preservation, opened in 1999, replacing the previous student center, Ferris Booth Hall, which stood from 1960 to 1996. The cafeteria in Lerner Hall still bears the name of Ferris Booth, and unlike the other large cafeteria on campus in John Jay, Ferris Booth utilizes only plastic silverware and paper plates. The building attempts to both conform to its context of neoclassical McKim, Mead, and White buildings as well as break out of their mold. In so doing, Lerner Hall features redbrick cladding and proportions that hold the street wall of university buildings along Broadway, but reveals a vast glass wall to the campus fabricated by Eiffel Constructions Metalliques, descendant of the firm that built the Eiffel Tower. Behind the wall are a series of escalating ramps that give the building a unified sense of space and are meant to act as a social meeting place much like the steps of Low Memorial Library.

Lerner Hall features both a cinema and auditorium named for Roone Arledge, a Columbia alumnus with a distinguished career in sports broadcasting and television news. The building also contains eateries, performance space, student club space, lounges, and administrative offices.

== Criticism ==
The building began receiving harsh criticism even before it was completed. The escalating ramps have never met their purpose as a social meeting place, instead taking up valuable space and slowing movement between floors. The gigantic rectangular hole in the interior of the building caused by the ramps is the main target of criticism, as it could be used for more student and study space. The hole gives Lerner Hall a doughnut shape, as one can see all the way down to the first floor from the fifth floor. Due to space constraints, few student activities have individual offices, the vast majority receiving only locker space. The layout—particularly in the administrative areas of the building—has been described as labyrinthine. Neighbors protested that the building serves to further wall off Columbia from the community. Architecture critics have lambasted the building for managing to be simultaneously dull and offensive, and failing to conform to the beaux arts style of the surrounding campus.

== Traditions ==
Lerner Hall is home to social events throughout the academic year. The most significant include the Varsity Show, an annual satirical musical about university life, and Glass House Rocks, in which Lerner (the "glass house") is transformed into a giant party space (the event takes its name from the former television series School House Rock) with performances from a Capella groups, bands, and dance groups.
