= Louis Zwahlen =

Swiss locksmith and politician

- Born: 2 April 1857; Lausanne, Switzerland
- Died: 2 June 1919 (aged 62); Le Brassus, Switzerland
- Occupations: Locksmith; politician
- Spouses: Marie Louise Henriette Girardet (m. 1881) Marie Louise Fanny Jordan, née Roussy (m. 1906)

Louis Zwahlen (2 April 1857 – 2 June 1919) was a Swiss locksmith and politician. In 1881 he founded a locksmithing and ornamental ironwork workshop in Lausanne, which he moved to Prilly in 1906 as Zwahlen & Mayr. In 1917 he was elected to the Grand Council of Vaud.

== Biography ==
Louis Zwahlen was born in Lausanne, the son of Paul Charles Rudolph Zwahlen, a typographer, and Louise Schmidhauser. He came from a modest background. He went to school in Vevey, where he also did an apprenticeship as a locksmith. After an internship in Paris, he founded a locksmithing and ornamental ironwork workshop in Lausanne in 1881. In 1906 he moved his business, Zwahlen & Mayr, to Prilly. In 1917 he was elected to the Grand Council of Vaud as an independent liberal. He sat on the boards of several industrial companies, banks and insurance companies.

In 1881 Zwahlen married Marie Louise Henriette Girardet, daughter of Ferdinand Girardet, a secretary in the cantonal administration of Vaud. In 1906 he married Marie Louise Fanny Jordan, née Roussy, daughter of Théodore Auguste Louis Roussy. He died on 2 June 1919 in Le Brassus, in the municipality of Le Chenit.

== Bibliography ==
- W. de Marco, La ferronnerie lausannoise, 2012

=== Archives ===
- Archives cantonales vaudoises: dossier of the Schweizerische Depeschenagentur (Swiss news agency)
- Stadtarchiv Lausanne (Archives de la Ville de Lausanne): documentation
