= Trustees of Columbia University in the City of New York =

Governing board of university in New York, US

Coordinates: 40°48′30″N 73°57′43″W

The Trustees of Columbia University in the City of New York is the governing board of Columbia University in New York City. Founded in 1754, it is sometimes referred to as the Columbia Corporation. The Trustees of Columbia University is a 501(c)(3) organization and the owner of the property and real assets of the university. Affiliates of the university, which include Barnard College, Jewish Theological Seminary, Teachers College, and Union Theological Seminary, are separate legal entities.

The board of trustees was originally composed of ex officio members including officials from the New York colonial government, crown officials, and various Protestant ministers from the city. Following the college's resuscitation following the American Revolutionary War, it was placed under the control of the Board of Regents of the University of the State of New York, and the university would finally come under the control of a private board of trustees in 1787. The board is notable for having administered the Pulitzer Prize from the prize's establishment until 1975.

As of 2026, the board of trustees consists of 21 members and is co-chaired by Abigail Black Elbaum and Jeh Johnson.

== Structure and function ==
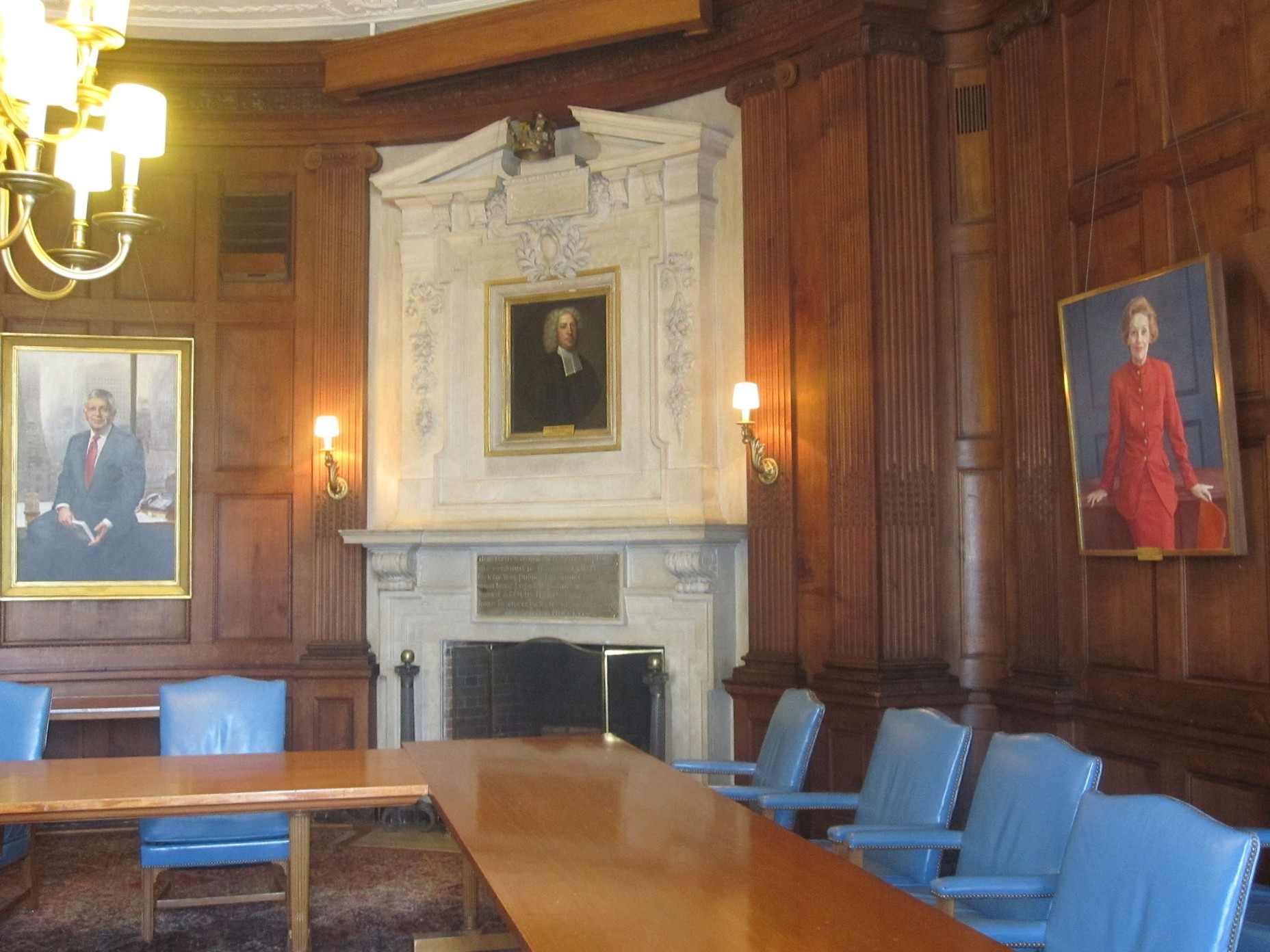
The Trustees' Room in Low Memorial Library

The board is governed by a maximum of 24 trustees, including the president of the university, who serves ex officio. Six of the 24 candidates are nominated from a pool of candidates selected by the Columbia Alumni Association. Another six are nominated by the board in consultation with the University Senate. The remaining 12 are nominated by the trustees through an internal process. The board elects its own chair; the first woman to serve as chair, and the first to chair the governing board of any Ivy League university, was Gertrude Michelson, elected in 1989. The term of office for the trustees is six years and trustees serve for no more than two consecutive terms.

The trustees have met in a dedicated room in Low Memorial Library since 1897. They select the President, oversee all faculty and senior administrative appointments, monitor the budget, supervise the endowment, and protect university property. The board of trustees holds the exclusive power to grant degrees, including, by memoranda of understanding, to the affiliated institutions of Barnard College and Teachers College. As with most governing boards of private universities, the deliberations of the trustees are confidential. The trustees also oversaw the Pulitzer Prizes until 1975, when authority over the prizes was devolved to a separate board.

== History ==
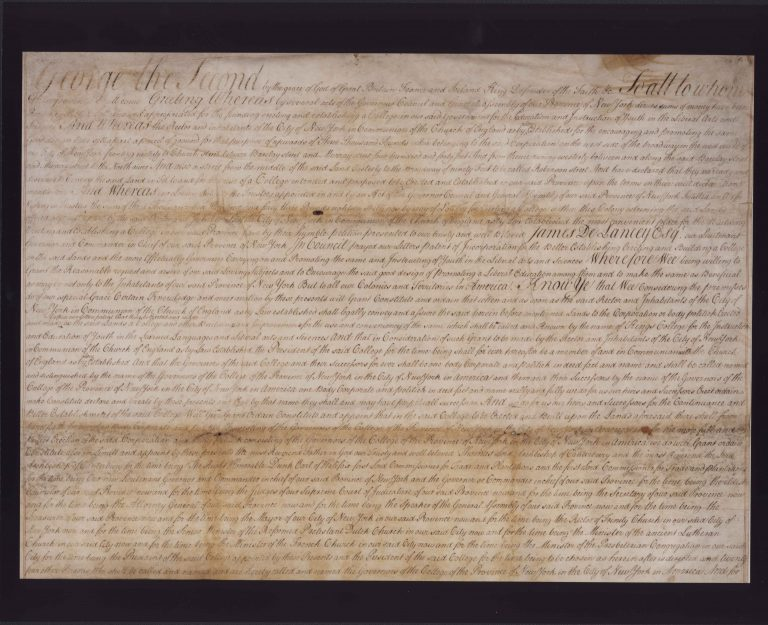
The charter of King's College, issued by George II of Great Britain in 1754

=== King's College ===
Following a decade of fundraising, primarily through interest-bearing loans made from the proceeds of public lotteries, those who had been legally entrusted with responsibility for this revenue petitioned for a royal charter to establish a new college on "a very valuable parcel of Ground on the west side of the Broadway" in the Province of New York. In 1754, King George II of Great Britain issued a charter establishing King's College as a legal corporation. The founding charter contained provisions for the government of this corporation, which consisted of a board of governors or directors, toward its formal mission: "the Instruction and Education of Youth in the Learned Languages and Liberal Arts and Sciences." According to the charter, this "body Corporate and politick" is granted final authority "to make and set down in writing, such Laws, ordinances, and orders, for the Better Government of the said College, and Students, and Ministers thereof, as they shall think best for the General Good of the same," thereby establishing the board's exclusive right to make and amend the rules governing the college, as long as they do not conflict with local, state, or federal laws.

The charter originally established the board of governors of King's College with 41 members, replacing the ten-member Lottery Commission appointed by the New York Assembly to oversee lottery funds allocated to the establishment of the college. These board members named in the charter would be replaced by successors chosen by the board when positions became vacant. The board of governors originally included several ex officio members, including, crown officials, members of the colonial government, and ministers of various Protestant denominations:

- the Archbishop of Canterbury
- the First Lord of Trade
- the Governor of the Province of New York
- the senior member of the Governor's Council
- the five justices of the Supreme Court of Judicature of the Province of New York
- the Secretary of the Province of New York
- the Attorney General of the Province of New York
- the Speaker of the General Assembly of New York
- the Treasurer of the Province of New York
- the Mayor of New York City
- the Rector of Trinity Church
- the Senior Minister of the Collegiate Reformed Protestant Dutch Church
- the Minister of the Evangelical Lutheran Church of St. Matthew
- the Minister of the Église Française du Saint-Esprit
- the Minister of the First Presbyterian Church
- the President of King's College

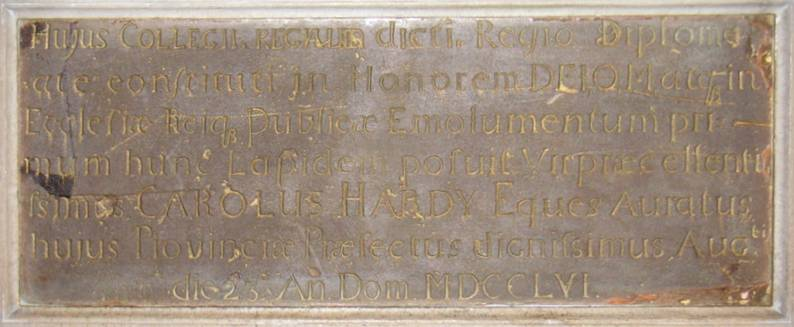
College Hall was the first building at Columbia until its demolition in 1857. Its cornerstone is installed in the Trustees' Room.

A further twenty-four individuals were named in the charter, serving without terms with their successors to be selected by subsequent governors. College faculty were not provided seats ex officio on the board of governors, at variance with contemporary practice at the Universities of Oxford and Cambridge, where the faculty was engaged in the governance of their colleges, but was very much in line with practice of other colonial colleges governed by external boards.

The charter permitted Protestants to serve as governors but excluded Roman Catholics and Jews. Only three members would be Anglicans: the Archbishop of Canterbury, the rector of Trinity Church, and the President of Columbia University, and they were offset by four ex officio members selected from New York's Dutch Reformed Church, French Protestant church, Lutheran Church, and Presbyterian Church. In practice, the board was dominated by Anglicans, members of the Trinity Church, and the Dutch Reformed Church. Of the fifty-nine men who served as governors, only three ex officio members were not from the Anglican or Dutch Reformed churches.

More than half of the fifty-nine New Yorkers who served as governor made their livings as merchants. The next most common occupation among the governors was law (20 percent), followed by ministers (16 percent), and there was only one doctor. The governors met 102 times in 22 years and most meetings were attended by around fifteen governors. A quarter of the governors attended fewer than ten meetings, and another half were absent, leaving a core of sixteen governors. Academic matters such as faculty appointments, the curriculum, and admissions requirements were overseen by degree-bearing ministers, while governors drawing from the city's mercantile and legal ranks oversaw financial matters such as construction of collegiate buildings or the salary of the college steward. This informal division of duties survived the reorganization of the King's College into Columbia College and persisted into the 1960s.

In terms of politics, the ratio of Loyalists to Patriots during the American Revolution among the governors was more than eight to one. The college was severely affected by the revolutionary war, which forced the college to shut down for eight years and a number of governors fled to Canada and the West Indies.

=== Columbia College ===
In 1784, it became the Board of Regents of Columbia College after the former King's College was reinstated. The 1784 charter also stipulated that eight of the seats on the board should be held by ranking state officials ex officio, with the remaining 24 regents to be appointed, two each, from the state's 12 counties, with only three places reserved for New York City residents. The number of regents was subsequently expanded to 33 by the New York State Legislature, with 20 of them residents of New York City, including a mix of prominent politicians and clergymen such as John Jay, Samuel Provoost, Leonard Lispenard, Gershom Mendes Seixas, and John Daniel Gros.

It was renamed in a new 1787 charter as the Trustees of Columbia College in the City of New York, and the college was relieved of its duties as a state institution, returning to earlier status as a privately governed college serving the city. None of the college's trustees were to be state officials, and all replacements were to be elected by incumbent board members. Only until 1908 did the board start accepting alumni nominations.

=== Columbia University ===
The board arrived at its final name of The Trustees of Columbia University in the City of New York by an order from the Supreme Court of New York on July 17, 1912, 16 years after Columbia College was renamed as Columbia University.

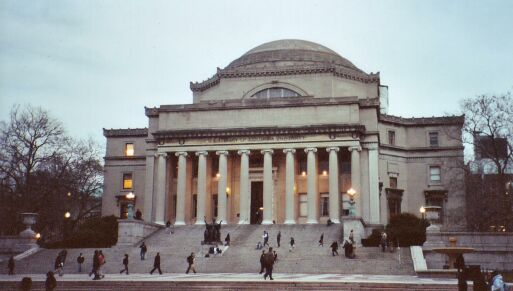
Low Memorial Library

Although the trustees usually approve faculty recommendations for hiring and dismissal of Columbia faculty, in some cases they have taken a more direct role. Notably, in 1917 they fired psychologist James McKeen Cattell for his anti-war and anti-conscription views, a case significant in the history of academic freedom.

==== 1968 protests ====
The trustees have been blamed for the violent suppression of protestors in the Columbia University protests of 1968, after they instructed the university administration to call in the police against the protestors and later lauded the police for their efforts. The 1968 Cox Commission Report—which found that the ineffective or lacking channels of communication between the university's administration, faculty, and students created the conditions for the protests—led to the establishment of the Columbia University Senate. On April 8, 1969 students and faculty overwhelmingly supported the creation of the University Senate in a campus-wide referendum. In 1973, the trustees adopted the Rules of University Conduct.

In 2001, the trustees were accused of pressuring the university to water down its sexual misconduct policy, and the director of the Office of Sexual Misconduct Prevention and Education resigned in protest, claiming that the trustees had directed her not to discuss the policy changes.

Internal disagreements do not often spill out into public, although a notable exception to this occurred in 2012, when trustee José A. Cabranes published a dissenting opinion on the status of Columbia College and its core curriculum within the university, in a column in Columbia's student newspaper, the Columbia Daily Spectator.

==== Gaza Solidarity Encampment ====
During the Gaza Solidarity Encampment (17–April 30, 2024), part of the broader protest movement demanding that Columbia disinvest from Israel during the Gaza genocide, the board of trustees announced that it "strongly" supported then-university-president Minouche Shafik days after the New York Police Department was summoned to arrest approximately 100 student demonstrators and after House Republicans Mike Johnson and Virginia Foxx called for her resignation. After students re-established the Gaza Solidarity Encampment on the opposite lawn, a group of 21 Democrats of the United States House of Representatives suggested that the trustees resign if they were unwilling to call in the NYPD to arrest student protestors again. The Barnard-Columbia chapter of the American Association of University Professors drafted a "Resolution of Censure of President Shafik, her Administration, and the Co-chairs of the Board of Trustees."

According to Timothy Kaufman-Osborn, "Columbia is legally organized as an autocratic corporation whose foremost imperative is to guarantee the security of the property held in its name" and the administration's decision to issue interim suspensions to student protesters and invite the NYPD onto campus to then arrest them en masse for trespassing was a decision made in order to maintain its "commitment to amass and secure its privatized property."

According to an October 2024 report from the Committee on Education & the Workforce of the U.S. House of Representatives, co-chairs of the board of trustees, David Greenwald and Claire Shipman, as well as chair emeritus Jonathan Lavine, were in discussion over what punishments the university should impose on student protesters. The report revealed that executive vice president for university life Dennis Mitchell "had spoken with Greenwald for 'two and a half hours,' going over the status of 'every single one of our disciplinary cases'." According to the Association of Legal Advocates and Attorneys, The Legal Aid Society, for which Greenwald also serves as treasurer and board member, shielded Greenwald and issued "an organizational response that downplayed police violence and abandoned its victims."

On May 7, 2025, hours after the student occupation of Butler Library, the trustees quietly and retroactively moved disciplinary cases since March 21 from the University Judicial Board, under the purview of the University Senate, to the office of the provost. According to The Columbia Daily Spectator, "students lost their right to request an open hearing, be granted a specific time frame for their disciplinary process, and protest inside academic buildings" and the University Senate "lost all jurisdiction over the Rules and the Rules Administrator gained the ability to launch investigations into students, even if no complaints have been filed against them."

==== Settlement with the Trump administration and review of the University Senate ====
In March 2025, the Trump administration, citing what it called widespread antisemitism at Columbia, cut $400 million in federal funding to the university and issued a list of demands it considered "preconditions for formal negotiations" to which Columbia agreed. On March 28, co-chair Claire Shipman became acting president, replacing interim president Katrina Armstrong. Three weeks later, Shipman announced that the University Senate would be subject to review following the Trump administration's demands regarding student discipline.

On July 23, 2025, the board of trustees formalized a settlement with the Trump administration in which Columbia would pay the federal government $221 million and accept various demands from the Trump administration, including adopting the IHRA definition of antisemitism; punishing student demonstrators with expulsions, degree revocations, and multi-year suspensions; and reviewing the university's Middle East studies programs. Critics of the settlement have called the government's actions "extortion" and Columbia's actions "capitulation."

In December 2025, the Columbia chapter of the American Association of University Professors proposed sweeping changes to the university's board of trustees in the service of the principle of shared governance, including disclosed nominations and provisions that half the seats of the board be chosen through "open nomination" and "competitive direct elections."

On April 23, 2026, the co-chairs of the board of trustees, David Greenwald and Jeh Johnson, released a report dated December 2025 on the review of the University Senate, which included 15 recommendations, along with four internal changes to trustee processes.

== Current trustees ==
The board consists of the following 21 members as of 2026:

Name	Columbia Degree(s)	Occupation
David Greenwald	JD 1983	Former chairman of Fried, Frank, Harris, Shriver & Jacobson
Jeh Johnson (co-chair)	JD 1982	Partner at Paul, Weiss, Rifkind, Wharton & Garrison, United States Secretary of Homeland Security from 2013 to 2017
Abigail Black Elbaum (co-chair)	BA 1992, MBA 1994	Co-founder and principal of Ogden CAP Properties
Mark Gallogly (vice chair)	MBA 1986	Co-managing partner and founder of Centerbridge Partners
Victor Mendelson (vice chair)	BA 1989	Co-president and director of HEICO
Dean Dakolias (vice chair)	BS 1989	Co-CIO of the credit funds group at Fortress Investment Group
Kathy Surace-Smith (vice chair)	JD 1984	Senior vice president at NanoString Technologies
Claire Shipman	BA 1986, MIA 1994	Journalist
Andrew F. Barth	BA 1983, MBA 1985	Former chairman of Capital Guardian Trust Company
Duchesne Drew	BA 1989	President of Minnesota Public Radio
Keith Goggin	MS 1991	Market maker on NYSE
James Gorman	MBA 1987	Former CEO of Morgan Stanley 2010-2024
Kikka Hanazawa	BA 2000	Social entrepreneur
Adam Pritzker	BA 2008	Co-founder and chairman of General Assembly
Julissa Reynoso	JD 2001	Former ambassador of the United States to Spain from 2022 to 2024
Jonathan Rosand	BA 1989, MD 1994	Professor of neurology at Harvard Medical School
James Scapa	BS 1978	CEO of Altair
Shoshana Shendelman	MA 2003, MSc 2004, PhD 2005	Founder, CEO and chair of Applied Therapeutics
Fermi Wang	MS 1989, PhD 1991	CEO and co-founder of Ambarella Inc.
Shirley Wang	MBA 1993	Founder and CEO of Plastpro Inc
Alisa Amarosa Wood	BA 2001, MBA 2008	Co-CEO of KKR Private Equity Conglomerate LLC

== Notable past trustees ==
The following people have served as trustees in the past:

Name	Columbia Degree(s)	Occupation
Rolando Acosta	BA 1979, JD 1982	presiding justice of the Appellate Division of the New York Supreme Court, First Judicial Department
A'Lelia Bundles	MS 1976	journalist, news producer, author
José A. Cabranes	BA 1961	judge of the United States Court of Appeals for the Second Circuit, former Presiding Judge of the United States Foreign Intelligence Surveillance Court of Review
William Campbell	BA 1962, MEd 1964	founder of Claris, former chairman and CEO of Intuit and director of Apple Inc.
Jerome Chazen	MBA 1950	founder of Liz Claiborne, Inc
Thomas Ludlow Chrystie II	BA 1955	former CFO of Merrill Lynch & Company
Patricia Cloherty	MS 1970	chairman and CEO of Delta Private Equity Partners
Edward N. Costikyan	BA 1947, LLB 1949	partner of Paul, Weiss, Rifkind, Wharton & Garrison and political adviser
John Curley	MS 1963	professor at Pennsylvania State University, former editor of USA Today and chairman of Gannett
Evan A. Davis	JD 1969	partner of Cleary Gottlieb Steen & Hamilton, former president of the New York City Bar Association
Marcellus Hartley Dodge Sr.	BA 1903	former chairman of the Remington Arms Company
Stephen Friedman	JD 1962	chairman of Stone Point Capital, former director of the United States National Economic Council and chairman of Goldman Sachs
Noam Gottesman	BA 1986	CEO of TOMS Capital and founder of GLG Partners
Joseph A. Greenaway Jr.	BA 1978	Judge of the United States Court of Appeals for the Third Circuit
Samuel L. Higginbottom	BS 1943	former chairman, CEO, president of Rolls-Royce North America, former CEO and president of Eastern Air Lines
Ben Horowitz	BA 1988	co-founder and general partner of Andreessen Horowitz
Ellen Kaden	JD 1977	former chief legal officer of CBS, Inc and Campbell Soup Company
Mark E. Kingdon	BA 1971	hedge fund manager and president of Kingdon Capital Management
Robert Kraft	BA 1963	chairman and CEO of The Kraft Group
Jonathan Lavine (Co-chair)	BA 1988	co-managing partner of Bain Capital
Gerry Lenfest	LLB 1958	lawyer, philanthropist
Li Lu	BA 1996, JD 1996, MBA 1996	founder and chairman of Himalaya Capital Management
Anna Kazanjian Longobardo	BS 1949, MS 1952	former executive of Unisys and co-founder of Society of Women Engineers
Donald McHenry	none	professor at Georgetown University School of Foreign Service, former United States Ambassador to the United Nations
Charles Li	JD 1991	former CEO of Hong Kong Exchanges and Clearing
Julie Menin	BA 1989	former chair of Manhattan Community Board 1, commissioner of New York City Department of Consumer and Worker Protection
Charles Miller Metzner	BA 1931, LLB 1933	former judge of the United States District Court for the Southern District of New York
Gertrude Michelson	LLB 1947	vice president of Macy's, deputy chair of Federal Reserve Bank, director of many corporations
Philip L. Milstein	BA 1971	principal of Ogden CAP Properties and former chairman of Emigrant Bank
Yuzaburo Mogi	MBA 1961	chairman and CEO of Kikkoman
Vikram Pandit	BS 1976, MS 1977, MPhil 1980, PhD 1986	chairman of The Orogen Group and former CEO of Citigroup
Lionel Pincus	MBA 1956	founder of Warburg Pincus
Edmund Prentis	BS 1906	founder of Spencer, White & Prentis, president of the American Standards Association
Warren H. Phillips	none	former CEO of Dow Jones & Company
Arnold S. Relman	MD 1946	former editor of The New England Journal of Medicine
George Erik Rupp	none	former President of Columbia University, Rice University, and the International Rescue Committee
Jonathan Schiller	BA 1969, JD 1973	co-founder of Boies Schiller Flexner LLP
Michael I. Sovern	BA 1953, LLB 1955	former President of Columbia University, chairman of Sotheby's, American Academy in Rome, and Japan Society
Jerry Speyer	BA 1962, MBA 1964	founder and chairman of Tishman Speyer
Joan E. Spero	MIA 1968	former Under Secretary of State for Economic Growth, Energy, and the Environment
David Stern	JD 1966	former Commissioner of the NBA
Arthur Hays Sulzberger	BA 1913	former publisher of The New York Times
Punch Sulzberger	BA 1951	former publisher of The New York Times and chairman of The New York Times Company and Metropolitan Museum of Art
Savio Tung	BS 1973	former CEO and co-founder of Investcorp
Lawrence Walsh	BA 1931, LLB 1935	former United States Deputy Attorney General and judge on the United States District Court for the Southern District of New York, independent counsel on the Iran–Contra affair investigations
Faye Wattleton	MSN 1967	former president of Planned Parenthood
Felix Wormser	BS 1916	former Assistant Secretary of the Interior for Mineral Resources
Sheena Wright	BA 1990, JD 1994	deputy mayor of New York City
John Eugene Zuccotti	none	real estate developer and former U.S. chairman of Brookfield Properties

== Pulitzer Prizes ==
The trustees ceded direct oversight of the Pulitzer Prizes in 1975. Before that period, the trustees occasionally overruled the awarding of prizes. An early example of this occurred in 1921, when the trustees overruled the jury recommendation and awarded the fiction prize to Edith Wharton for The Age of Innocence instead of Sinclair Lewis for Main Street. A similar controversy ensued in 1962, when the trustees overruled the jury's choice of W. A. Swanberg's Citizen Hearst, a biography of William Randolph Hearst, apparently because they thought that Hearst was not dignified enough to be the subject of the award. The trustees instead chose to give no award in that category that year.
