= Saul Horowitz Jr. =

American business executive

- Born: May 5, 1925; New York City, United States
- Died: June 24, 1975 (aged 50); John F. Kennedy International Airport, New York City
- Education: Massachusetts Institute of Technology
- Occupation: Business executive
- Known for: Chairman of HRH Construction
- Spouse: Mary Elizabeth Blakeney (m. 1950)
- Relatives: Richard Ravitch (cousin)

Saul Horowitz Jr. (May 5, 1925 – June 24, 1975) was an American construction executive who was the chairman of HRH Construction.

== Early life and military career ==
Horowitz was born in New York City on May 5, 1925 to Saul and Miriam (Ravitch) Horowitz. He graduated from Phillips Academy in 1942 and received an appointment to the United States Military Academy. He graduated in 1946 with a degree in engineering. He served in Japan with the 11th Airborne Division from 1947 to 1949 and the office of the IX Corps engineer from 1949 to 1950. In 1950, he married Mary Elizabeth Blakeney, the daughter of a United States Army colonel. They settled in Boston, where Horowitz took graduate courses in engineering at the Massachusetts Institute of Technology.

At the start of the Korean War, Horowitz was assigned Fort Belvoir, where he served in the Engineer Replacement Training Center and attended the Engineer Advanced Course. From 1953 to 1954, he served Korea as the commanding officer the 76th Engineer Battalion. His unit received the Meritorious Unit Commendation for its work on facilities in the Korean Demilitarized Zone and bridges over the Han River. Horowitz was awarded the Bronze Star Medal for "superior efficiency and leadership" and the "exemplary manner in which [he] repeatedly performed duties normally assigned to officers of field grade rank". He left the Army in 1954 with the rank of Captain.

== HRH Construction ==
In 1954, Horowitz joined his family's company, HRH Construction. He became executive vice president in 1958, president in 1965, and chairman in 1972. He led the company alongside his cousin Richard Ravitch, with Horowitz focusing on construction related issues while Ravitch, an attorney, worked on financing and government relations. Under their leadership, HRH built the Waterside Plaza, Trump International Hotel and Tower, and 945 Madison Avenue, and began work on the Citigroup Center and Manhattan Plaza. In 1975, Horowitz was awarded Engineering News-Record 's award of excellence.

== Other work ==
Horowitz was a director of Mount Sinai Hospital and Consolidated Cigar, campaign chairman for the Federation of Jewish Philanthropies, member of the Republican National Finance Committee, and president of the Associated General Contractors of America. He was a member of the Scarsdale, New York board of education from 1964 to 1965, a member of the village board of trustees from 1965 to 1969, and mayor of Scarsdale from 1969 to 1971.

== Death ==
On June 24, 1975, Horowitz was returning home from an Associated General Contractors of America meeting in New Orleans on Eastern Air Lines Flight 66, which crashed on approach at John F. Kennedy International Airport. The accident killed 113 of the 124 people on board, including Horowitz.

Business positions
Preceded by Saul Horowitz Sr.	President of HRH Construction; 1965–1972	Succeeded by Richard Ravitch
Political offices
Preceded by Malcolm A. MacIntyre	Mayor of Scarsdale, New York; 1969–1971	Succeeded by Richard W. Darrow
