= Samuel L. Higginbottom =

American businessman (1921–2016)

- Born: October 5, 1921; North Lawrence, Ohio
- Died: November 13, 2016 (aged 95); Miami, Florida
- Education: Columbia University (BS '47)
- Spouse: Fair Steinschneider (m. 1947)
- Military career
- Branch: United States Army Air Forces
- Service years: 1943–1945
- Rank: Captain
- Conflicts: World War II

Samuel Logan Higginbottom (October 5, 1921 – November 13, 2016) was an American aerospace businessman. He served as president of Eastern Air Lines and Rolls-Royce North America and was chairman of the board of trustees of Columbia University.

== Biography ==
Higginbottom was born in North Lawrence, Ohio and graduated from Columbia University with a BS in civil engineering in 1943. After graduation, Higginbottom enrolled in the U.S. Army Air Corps and served in World War II, earning a Bronze Star Medal.

After the war, Higginbottom worked for Trans World Airlines, becoming senior vice president of engineering and maintenance. He then joined Eastern Airlines, where he served as president, CEO, and a member of the board of directors from 1970 to 1973. As chief executive, he was responsible for enlarging the airlines' engine service center as well as its business operations during the early 70s.

From 1974 to his retirement in 1986, Higginbottom was chairman, President and chief executive officer of Rolls-Royce North America. In 1982, he was appointed chairman of the board of trustees of Columbia University, of which he had been a trustee since 1978, and served until 1989. As chairman of the trustees, he was criticized for refusing to divest from South Africa.

He was made an honorary Commander of the British Empire by Elizabeth II for his work with Rolls-Royce.

Higginbottom retired to Miami, where he remained active in the business world, serving as director of HEICO from 1989 until his death in 2016. He was also a director of Rolls-Royce Holdings, British Aerospace, the First National Bank of Miami, and was vice chairman of the board of trustees of St. Thomas University in Miami Gardens, Florida.

Higginbottom died on November 13, 2016, at age 95.
