= Malcolm A. MacIntyre =

American businessman (1908–1992)

- Born: January 28, 1908; Boston, Massachusetts
- Died: May 6, 1992 (aged 84); Falls Church, Virginia
- Education: Yale University (BA '29, JSD '33); Oxford University (BCL '33)
- Spouse: Clara Bishop (m. 1933)
- Military career
- Branch: United States Army Air Forces
- Service years: 1942–1946
- Rank: Colonel
- Unit: Air Transport Command
- Conflicts: World War II

Malcolm Ames MacIntyre (January 28, 1908 – May 6, 1992) was an American aviation executive, lawyer, and lacrosse player who was United States Under Secretary of the Air Force from 1957 to 1959 and president of Eastern Airlines and 1959 to 1963.

== Early life ==
MacIntyre was born on January 28, 1908 in Boston. He attended Boston Latin School from 1919 to 1924 and graduated from Newton High School in 1925. He graduated from Yale University in 1929 and received a Rhodes Scholarship. He received law degrees from Oxford University and Yale Law School. MacIntyre played four years of lacrosse while at Yale and was a first-team All-American his senior year. He continued to play at Oxford where he won three letters. In 1931, he toured the United States with an Oxford-Cambridge team which defeated both Army and Navy. While in England, he was selected three times to the All-Star English team. He coached Yale's lacrosse team when he returned for law school. In 1966, he was inducted into the National Lacrosse Hall of Fame.

On December 1, 1933, MacIntyre married Clara Bishop. They had three children. One of their daughters, Clare, had an on-again, off-again relationship with singer-songwriter Harry Chapin and was the inspiration for his 1972 song Taxi. MacIntyre, who did not approve of the relationship, was the inspiration for The Mayor of Candor Lied.

== Legal career ==
In 1933, MacIntyre began working for the firm of Sullivan & Cromwell in New York City. During World War II, he served in the United States Army Air Forces, leaving the service in 1946 with the rank of colonel. He then became a senior partner in the Washington, D.C.-based law firm Douglas, Proctor, MacIntyre, & Gates, which was counsel for American Airlines. In 1948, American Airlines moved its headquarters to New York City and MacIntyre followed, becoming a partner in Debevoise, Plimpton & McLean.

== Business career ==
In 1957, MacIntyre was appointed United States Under Secretary of the Air Force. In 1959, Eastern Airlines president Eddie Rickenbacker, with the support of the company's largest stockholder, Laurance Rockefeller, chose MacIntyre to be his successor. MacIntyre introduced the Eastern Air Lines Shuttle, dealt with multiple strikes, and worked on a proposed merger with American Airlines that was ultimately rejected by the Civil Aeronautics Board. He resigned in December 1963 and was succeeded by Floyd D. Hall. From 1964 to 1973, he was executive vice president of Martin Marietta.

== Later life ==
From 1966 to 1969, McIntyre was mayor of Scarsdale, New York. He relocated to McLean, Virginia in 1979. He died on May 6, 1992 at Fairfax Hospital.

Government offices
Preceded by James H. Douglas, Jr.	United States Under Secretary of the Air Force; June 5, 1957 – July 31, 1959	Succeeded by Dudley C. Sharp
Preceded by George H. Rutherford	Mayor of Scarsdale, New York; 1966–1969	Succeeded by Saul Horowitz Jr.
Business positions
Preceded by Eddie Rickenbacker	President of Eastern Airlines; 1959–1963	Succeeded by Floyd D. Hall
