= Gertrude Michelson =

American businessperson (1925–2015)

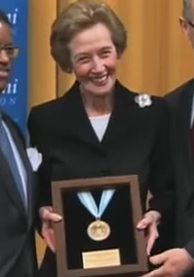
- Michelson in 2011
- Born: Gertrude Geraldine Rosen; June 3, 1925; Jamestown, New York, U.S.
- Died: January 10, 2015 (aged 89); New York City, U.S
- Education: Pennsylvania State University (BA); Columbia Law School (LLB)

Gertrude Geraldine Michelson, also known as G.G. Michelson (June 3, 1925 – January 10, 2015), was an American businesswoman. She was the first woman to head the board of trustees of an Ivy League university (Columbia), and the first woman to sit on the board of directors of Macy's and General Electric. She served as an executive of multiple Fortune 500 companies.

== Early life and education ==
Gertrude Geraldine Michelson was born Gertrude Geraldine Rosen in Jamestown, New York, on June 3, 1925, to Celia (née Cohen) and Thomas Rosen, Jewish immigrants from near Vilna in the Russian Empire. Michelson was the youngest of three children, and she was 11 years old when her mother died of tuberculosis. During her youth, the family traveled around the United States, spending time living in the Southwest in hopes that the air would heal Celia's illness, though Michelson and her siblings spent time in an orphanage while treatment was sought. After Celia died, the family moved to Upstate New York.

Michelson studied industrial psychology at Pennsylvania State University, graduating in 1945 aged nineteen, before attending Columbia Law School. She achieved her LLB as one of six women in the class of 1947. Michelson, seeking self-improvement, had been inspired to study law by men she met who talked about their ambitions to do so, though her father disapproved.

She was awarded an honorary PhD in policy analysis by Frederick S. Pardee RAND Graduate School in 2002, as well as from Adelphi University, New Rochelle College, and Marymount Manhattan College (Doctor of Laws).

== Career ==
Michelson did not want to practice law, and instead joined the executive training program at Macy's upon graduation. She was attracted to the chain because of its large female workforce. She stayed with Macy's and saw a series of promotions. She came up through human resources and in 1963 became the organization's first female vice president, as VP for employee personnel. In the 1970s she became a senior vice president and took on many national positions, including negotiations with a union representing 20,000 of the company's employees; according to The Women's Book of Records she was the only woman at the time to be working with such a major union.

Video of Michelson talking about Columbia

In 1970, she was appointed to Macy's New York Executive Committee and Board of Directors, becoming the first woman to sit on it, and in 1980 joined the Trustees of Columbia University in the City of New York before being elected its vice-chair in 1985 and chair in 1989, becoming the first woman to head the governing board of an Ivy League university. She chaired Columbia's board until 1992. During her time on the board, it decided to allow women to attend Columbia, something Michelson pushed for. She was Chair Emerita of Columbia's Board of Trustees, and was presented the Alumni Medal in 2011, having previously received the James Kent Award, Lawrence A. Wien Prize for Social Responsibility, and Frederick A. Barnard Award; she also sat on the Dean's Council.

During her career she sat on the board of directors of major companies in different industries, including Macy's; General Electric; Goodyear Tire; publisher Harper and Row; food conglomerate Quaker Oats; insurance provider Chubb; hardware manufacturer Stanley Works; investment bank Irving Trust; financial provider TIAA-CREF; mediation provider American Arbitration Association; historically black and female Spelman College; and think tank RAND Corporation. She was also a governor of the American Stock Exchange. In part due to being the first female board member of General Electric, the company awarded her the Sandra Day O'Connor Board Excellence Award in 2009. She also held roles in public service, including Deputy Chair of the Federal Reserve Bank of New York; Director of the New York City Partnership; Director of the Better Business Bureau of Metropolitan New York; and on the Emergency Financial Control Board as well as various city commissions, and for charitable organizations including the Markle Foundation; Helena Rubinstein Foundation; and Catalyst, which presented her with the Catalyst Award for Contribution to Corporate Leadership. She was also involved with the women's advocacy NOW Legal Defense and Education Fund.

A cousin of Michelson told The New York Times that among Michelson's tricks for dealing with male executives, she used her love of sports, as "it threw [the men] off so bad to talk baseball with a woman that they didn't know what to do." She was a mentor to male executives including Macy's CEOs Terry Lundgren and Edward Finkelstein, Bloomingdale's CEO Michael Gould, and General Electric CEO Jeff Immelt. Though cited as a female trailblazer who broke many glass ceilings for herself and other women, Michelson preferred to stay out of the spotlight. In 1989 she told The New York Times that "sometimes it's better to let others view what you've achieved in historical terms, while you just do the best you can as an individual."

== Personal life ==
While studying at Columbia Law, Michelson met her husband Horace Michelson, a nephew of Helen Rubinstein, whom she married in 1947 while they were still students. He introduced her to the New York Yankees, of which she became an ardent fan. Reportedly, Horace was supportive of his powerful wife and often attended events organised for wives at business events the couple attended. They had two daughters, Martha and Barbara; Martha died while a student at Goddard College, and Barbara studied at Le Cordon Bleu and became a baker. Horace (d. 2002) was a corporate lawyer, and served in the Army during World War II, receiving the Purple Heart, Bronze Star, and Silver Star.

She was a member of the Economic Club of New York, and a founding member of the International Women's Forum (originally named the Women's Forum of New York).

== Death ==
Michelson died at her home in Greenwich Village, New York City, on January 10, 2015, following a long illness. She did not have a funeral service.
