= Richard W. Darrow =

American public relations executive (1915–1976)

- Born: September 24, 1915; Champaign County, Ohio, U.S.
- Died: March 10, 1976 (aged 60); New York City, New York, U.S.
- Education: Ohio Wesleyan University
- Occupation: Public relations executive
- Known for: President, chief executive, and chairman of Hill & Knowlton
- Spouses: Nelda Darling (m. 1938; div. 1975); Suzanne Jane Tillman (m. 1975)
- Children: 2

Richard W. Darrow (September 24, 1915 – March 10, 1976) was an American public relations executive who was president, chief executive, and chairman of Hill & Knowlton.

== Early life ==
Darrow was born on September 24, 1915, in Champaign County, Ohio to Benjamin Harrison and Frances (Carter) Darrow. Benjamin Harrison Darrow was a pioneer in educational broadcasting and the founder of the Ohio School of the Air.

Darrow was a reporter for the Urbana Daily Citizen from 1933 to 1934 and the International News Service in 1935. He graduated with honors in political science from Ohio Wesleyan University in 1936. He then spent five years with The Columbus Citizen, where he was a reporter, aviation editor, and assistant city editor.

== Career ==
Darrow entered the public relations field in 1941. He was a public relations manager for Curtiss-Wright in Columbus, Ohio for two years, then worked in the company's offices in Buffalo, New York and New York City. In 1945, he became the assistant to the president of the American Meat Institute. From 1946 to 1952, he was the public relations director for Glenn L. Martin Company.

In 1952, Darrow joined Hill & Knowlton as a vice president. In 1955, he became an executive vice president. In 1966, he was promoted to president. He became the company's acting chief executive following the death of Bert C. Goss on April 1, 1971, and was named to the position later that month. Later that year, he succeeded founder John W. Hill as chairman of Hill & Knowlton while continuting to serve as chief executive officer.

== Other work ==
Darrow was a member of the Scarsdale, New York board of trustees from 1967 to 1971 and was the village's mayor from 1971 to 1973. He was a director of the Regional Plan Association.

From 1968 to 1972, Darrow was chairman of Ohio Wesleyan University's board of trustees. He was chairman of the United States Military Academy's civilian public relations advisory committee and was awarded the Outstanding Civilian Service Award for his work with the academy.

Darrow was a member of the national executive board of the Boy Scouts of America and was a member of the public relations advisory subcommittee of the World Organization of the Scout Movement. He received the Distinguished Eagle Scout, Silver Beaver, Silver Buffalo, and Bronze Wolf Awards for his service to scouting.

== Personal life and death ==
On September 17, 1938, Darrow married Nelda Darling. They had two sons – William, a doctor, and John, a United States Army officer. The Darrows were members of the Scarsdale Community Baptist Church. Their marriage ended in divorce. On September 21, 1975, he married Suzanne Jane Tillman at the Marble Collegiate Church in New York City. The ceremony was performed by Rev. Norman Vincent Peale.

Darrow died from cancer on March 10, 1976, at Roosevelt Hospital.

Political offices
| Preceded by Saul Horowitz Jr. | Mayor of Scarsdale, New York; 1969–1971 | Succeeded by Murray Steyer |
