= Floyd D. Hall =

American businessman (1916–2012)

- Born: April 4, 1916; Lamar, Colorado
- Died: April 26, 2012 (aged 96); Woodstock, Vermont
- Education: University of Colorado (BS '38)
- Spouse: Mary Feild (m. 1939)
- Military career
- Branch: United States Army Air Forces
- Service years: 1942–1946
- Rank: Lieutenant colonel
- Conflicts: World War II

Floyd D. Hall (April 4, 1916 – April 26, 2012) was an American businessman and pilot who was chief executive of Eastern Airlines from 1963 to 1975.

== Biography ==
Hall was born in Lamar, Colorado, the son of a hotel owner. He graduated from the University of Colorado Boulder in 1938, served in the United States Army Air Corps for two years, then joined Trans World Airlines (TWA) as a first officer. Upon the outbreak of World War II, he returned to the Army Air Corps, where he rose to the rank of lieutenant colonel. In 1946, he returned to Trans World Airlines, where he worked as a pilot for ten years, then in management.

In 1963, Hall joined Eastern Airlines as president and chief executive. In 1967, he became chairman, while remaining chief executive. Under his leadership, Eastern improved the quality and variety of its meals, introduced free drinks in first class, greatly improved on-time ratings, and undertook aggressive advertising campaigns. However, the airline continued to struggle, posting a $20.7 million loss in Hall's last year as CEO. He was succeeded as CEO by Frank Borman in December 1975. He resigned as chairman the following year.

He died in Woodstock, Vermont on April 26, 2012.

Business positions
Preceded by Malcolm A. MacIntyre	Chief executive of Eastern Airlines; 1963–1975	Succeeded by Frank Borman
