= Jonathan Lavine =

American businessman (born 1966)

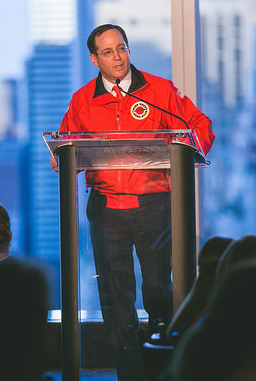
- Born: May 9, 1966 (age 60); Providence, Rhode Island, U.S.
- Education: Columbia University (BA); Harvard University (MBA)
- Occupations: Senior advisory partner at Bain Capital; Founder of Bain Capital Credit; Chair Emeritus of the Board of Trustees of Columbia University
- Spouse: Jeannie Diane Bachelor (m. 1992)
- Children: 2

Jonathan Scott Lavine (born May 9, 1966) is an American businessman and a senior advisory partner at Bain Capital. He founded Bain Capital Credit and Special Situations in 1998. He was co-managing partner of Bain Capital from 2016 to 2024. He was the co-chair of the Board of Trustees of Columbia University from 2018 to 2022. In 2022, he was chair, and in 2023, was named chair emeritus.

== Early life ==
Jonathan Lavine was born in Providence, Rhode Island to Jewish parents and graduated from Classical High School in 1984. Lavine then attended Columbia College, where he was elected to Phi Beta Kappa and earned a BA magna cum laude in 1988.

In 1992, Lavine earned an MBA from Harvard Business School.

== Personal life ==
Lavine married Jeannie Diane Bachelor in June 1992 at Temple B’nai Abraham in Livingston, New Jersey.

== Career ==
Lavine began his career as an analyst at Drexel Burnham Lambert's mergers and acquisition upon his graduation in 1988. From 1991-1993, he worked as a consultant for McKinsey & Company until moving on to Bain Capital. In 1998, Lavine founded Sankaty Advisors, LLC as the credit and special situations affiliate of Bain Capital and was managing partner and chief investment officer of the firm. Sankaty was renamed Bain Capital Credit in 2016. He is credited for creating the firm's special situations investment strategy, which provides bespoke capital solutions leveraging credit, equity, corporate and real estate expertise.

In 2016, Bain Capital named Lavine co-managing partner of the firm. Lavine continued to lead Bain Capital Credit and Special Situations after becoming co-managing partner of Bain Capital. In March 2024, Lavine became the Chair of Bain Capital.

On December 6, 2016, President Barack Obama named Lavine to be a member of the United States Holocaust Memorial Council. On May 17, 2023, President Joseph Biden reappointed Lavine to the Council.

In 2008, Lavine also became a member of the Boston Celtics ownership group, Boston Basketball Partners LLC.

== Philanthropy ==
Lavine has been on the board of several organizations and educational institutions, including City Year, Boston Children's Hospital, the Dana-Farber Cancer Institute, Columbia University, Horizons for Homeless Children, and Opportunity Nation.

In 2007, the Lavines formed the Crimson Lion Foundation, a private family foundation through which they have concentrated their philanthropic activities.

Lavine has donated to a number of organizations and institutions, including City Year, Harvard University, Harvard Business School, LIFT Communities, Equal Justice Initiative, public radio station WBUR, Columbia University, and the U.S. Holocaust Museum.
