= Eastern Air Lines =

Airline of the United States (1926–1991)

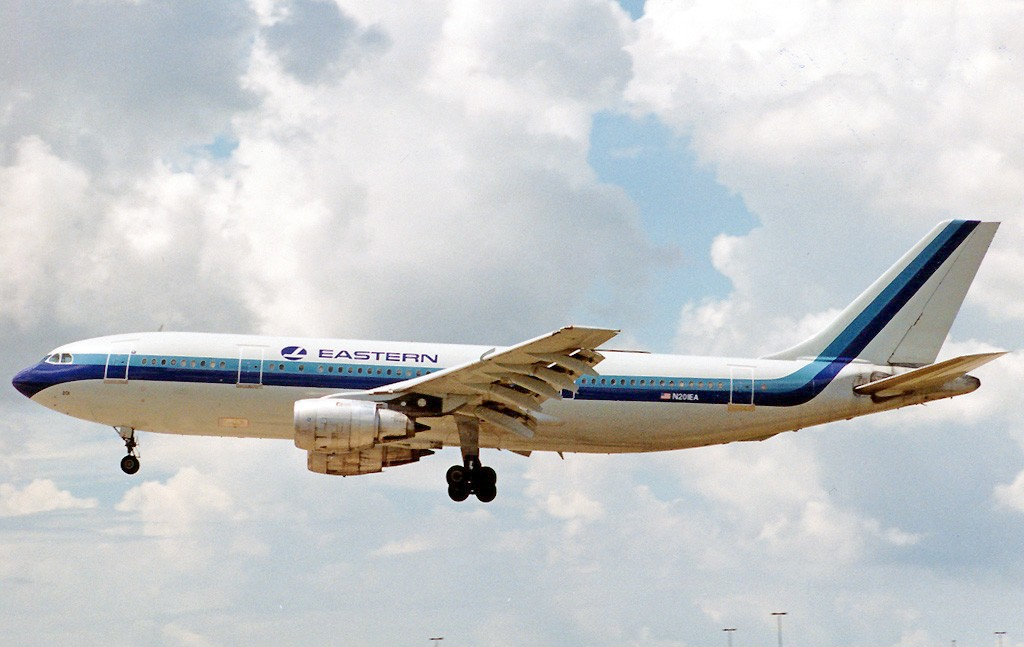
- An Airbus A300 of Eastern Air Lines
IATA	ICAO	Call sign
EA	EAL	EASTERN
- Founded: April 19, 1926 (as Pitcairn Aviation)
- Ceased operations: January 18, 1991
- Hubs: Miami
- Secondary hubs: Atlanta; Charlotte; Kansas City; New York–JFK; New York–LaGuardia; Philadelphia; San Juan; Washington–National
- Focus cities: Boston; Chicago–O'Hare; Orlando; Tampa
- Frequent-flyer program: OnePass
- Subsidiaries: Eastern Air Lines Shuttle (1961–1989)
- Parent company: Texas Air Corporation (1986–1990)
- Headquarters: Miami-Dade County, Florida, United States
- Key people: Frank Borman (president); Frank Lorenzo (Texas Air owner)
- Founder: Eddie Rickenbacker (First CEO)

Eastern Air Lines (also colloquially known as Eastern) was a trunk carrier, a scheduled airline in the United States that operated from 1926 to 1991. Before its dissolution, it was headquartered at Miami International Airport in an unincorporated area of Miami-Dade County, Florida.

Eastern was one of the "Big Four" domestic airlines created by the Spoils Conferences of 1930, and was headed in its early years by World War I flying ace Eddie Rickenbacker. It had a near monopoly in air travel between New York and Florida from the 1930s until the 1950s and dominated this market for decades afterward.

During airline deregulation in the late 1970s and early 1980s, labor disputes and high debt loads strained the company under the leadership of former astronaut Frank Borman. Frank Lorenzo acquired Eastern in 1985 and moved many of its assets to his other airlines, including Continental Airlines and Texas Air Corporation. After continued labor disputes and a crippling strike in 1989, Eastern ran out of money and was liquidated in 1991.

American Airlines obtained many of Eastern's routes from Miami International Airport to Latin America and the Caribbean. Delta Air Lines, Eastern's main competitor at Hartsfield–Jackson Atlanta International Airport, acquired many of Eastern's Lockheed L-1011 TriStar aircraft. USAir acquired 11 of Eastern's 25 Boeing 757-225 aircraft.

Eastern pioneered hourly air shuttle services between New York City, Washington, D.C., and Boston in 1961 as the Eastern Air Lines Shuttle. It took over Braniff International's South American routes following Braniff's closure in 1982 and served London Gatwick in 1985 via its McDonnell Douglas DC-10-30 "Golden Wings" service. Although Eastern announced on its March 2, 1986, timetable that it intended to initiate service to Madrid, effective May 1, 1986, it never commenced. The only scheduled transatlantic service Eastern provided was Miami to London Gatwick, commencing on July 15, 1985, and discontinuing the following year, in 1986, replaced with codeshare flights from Atlanta on British Caledonian Airways.

== History ==
=== Origins ===
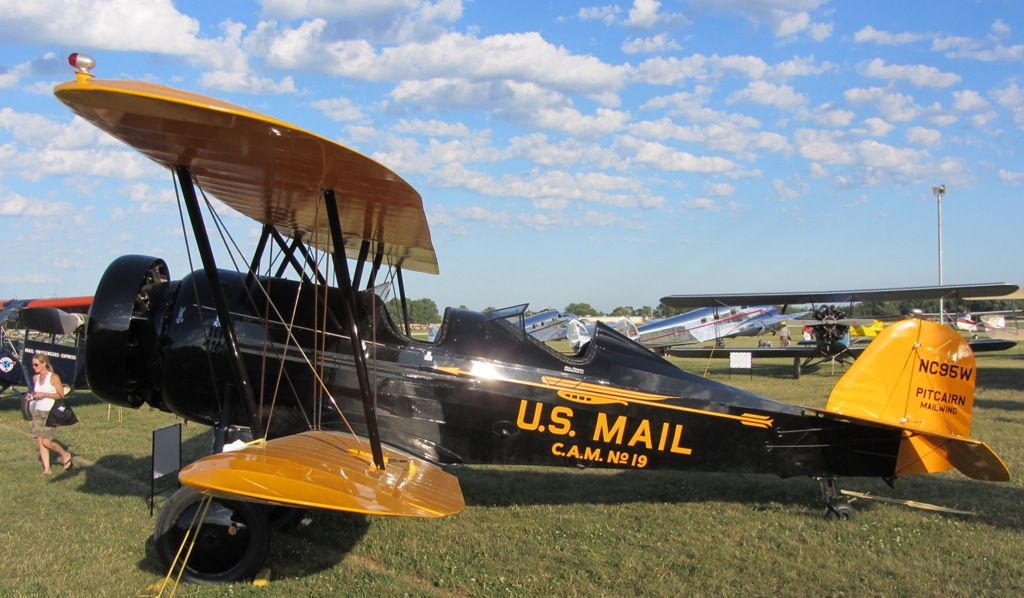
Pitcairn Aviation's PA-7S CAM-19 Route Airmail aircraft

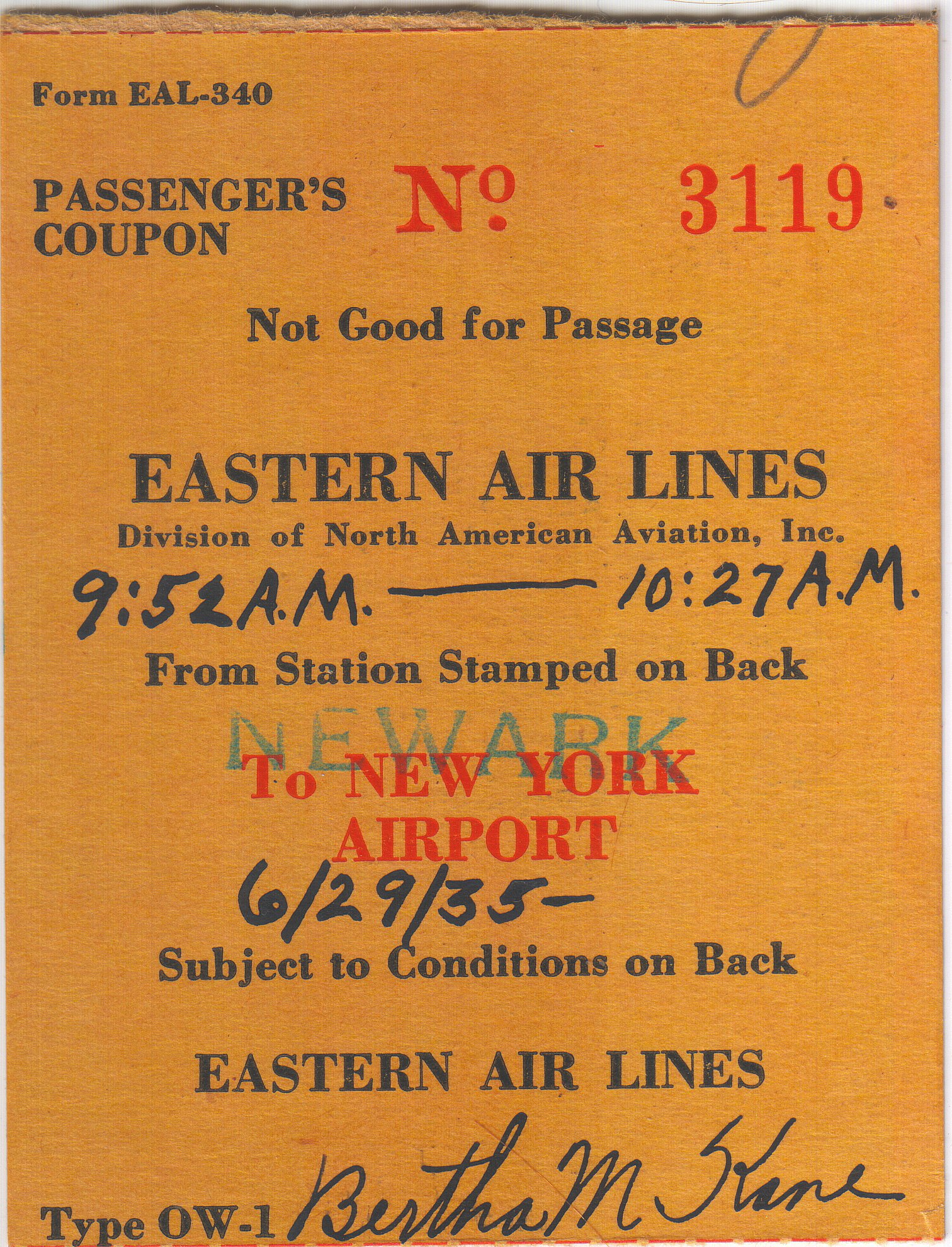
An Eastern Air Lines passenger coupon in 1935

Eastern Air Lines was a composite of assorted air travel corporations, including Florida Airways and Pitcairn Aviation. In the late 1920s, Pitcairn Aviation won a contract to fly mail between New York City and Atlanta, Georgia on Mailwing single-engine aircraft. In 1929, Clement Keys, the owner of North American Aviation, purchased Pitcairn. In 1930, Keys changed the company's name to Eastern Air Transport. After being purchased by General Motors and experiencing a change in leadership after the Airmail Act of 1934, the airline became known as Eastern Air Lines.

=== Growth under Rickenbacker ===
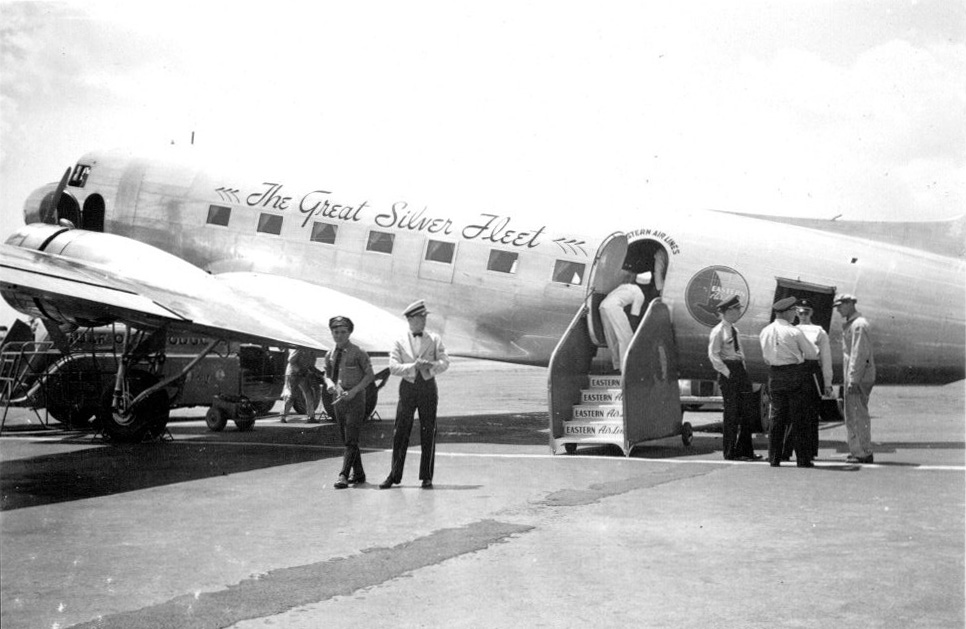
The Great Silver Fleet in 1939

By 1937, Eastern's route system stretched from New York to Washington, Atlanta, and New Orleans, and from Chicago to Miami. In the same year, it operated 20 daily flights and returns, every hour on the hour, between New York and Washington; the flight time was one hour, twenty minutes, one-way.

In 1938, World War I flying ace Eddie Rickenbacker bought Eastern from General Motors. The complex deal was concluded when Rickenbacker together with Sidney Shannon presented Alfred P. Sloan with a certified check for US$3,500,000 (equivalent to $80,050,000 in 2025).

Rickenbacker pushed Eastern into a period of growth and innovation; for a time Eastern was the most profitable airline in the post-war era, never needing state subsidy. In the late 1950s Eastern's position was eroded by subsidies to rival airlines and the arrival of the jet age. On October 1, 1959, Rickenbacker's position as CEO was taken over by Malcolm A. MacIntyre, a brilliant lawyer but a man inexperienced in airline operations.' Rickenbacker's ouster was largely due to his reluctance to acquire expensive jets as he underestimated their appeal to the public. A new management team headed by Floyd D. Hall took over on December 16, 1963, and Rickenbacker left his position as director and chairman of the board on December 31, 1963, aged 73.

In 1956, Eastern bought Colonial Airlines, giving the airline its first routes to Canada.

=== The Jet Age ===
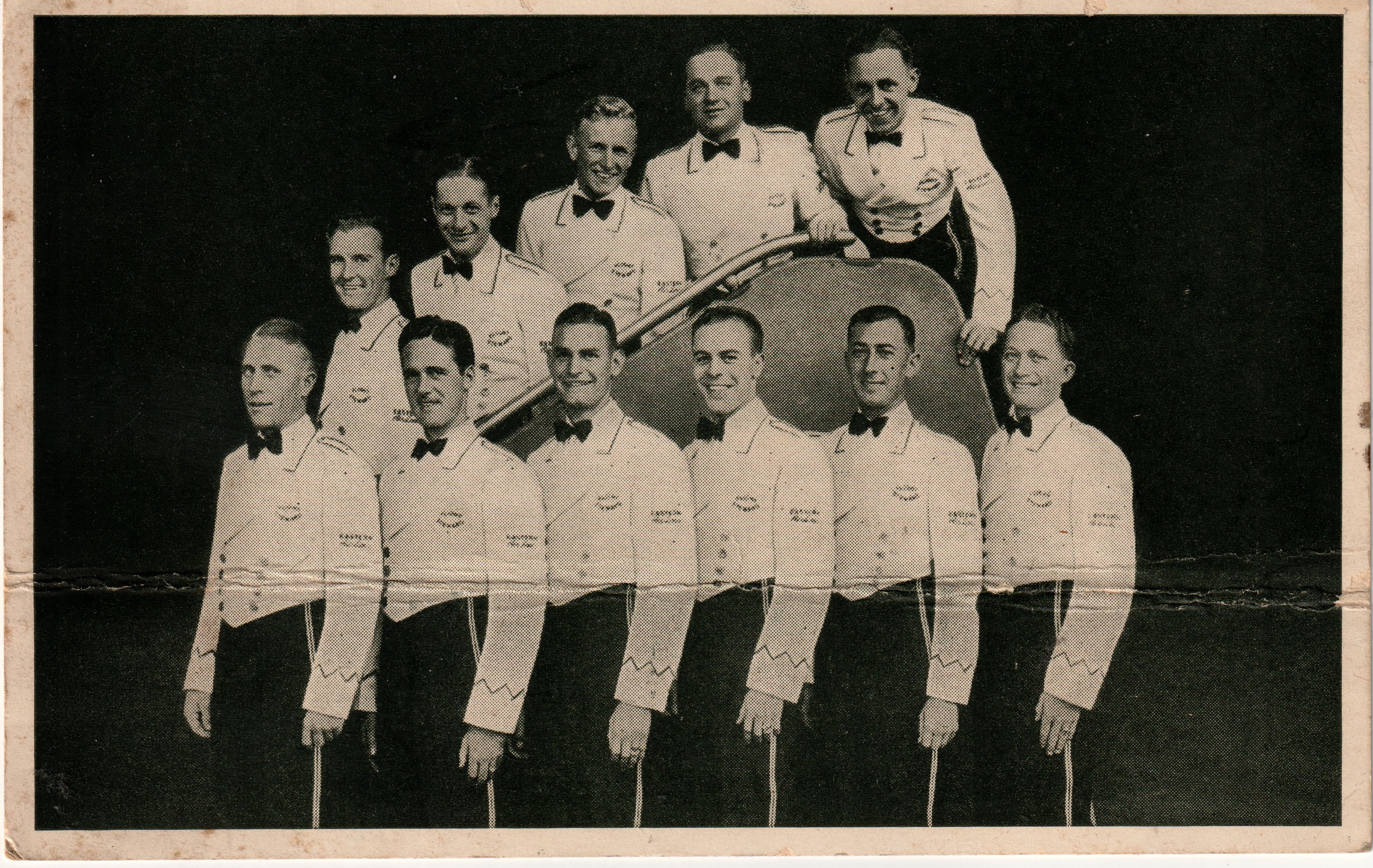
Flight crew of stewards for an Eastern Air Lines Silverliner, circa 1950s

An Eastern Air Lines DC-3 on display at the National Air and Space Museum in Washington, D.C.

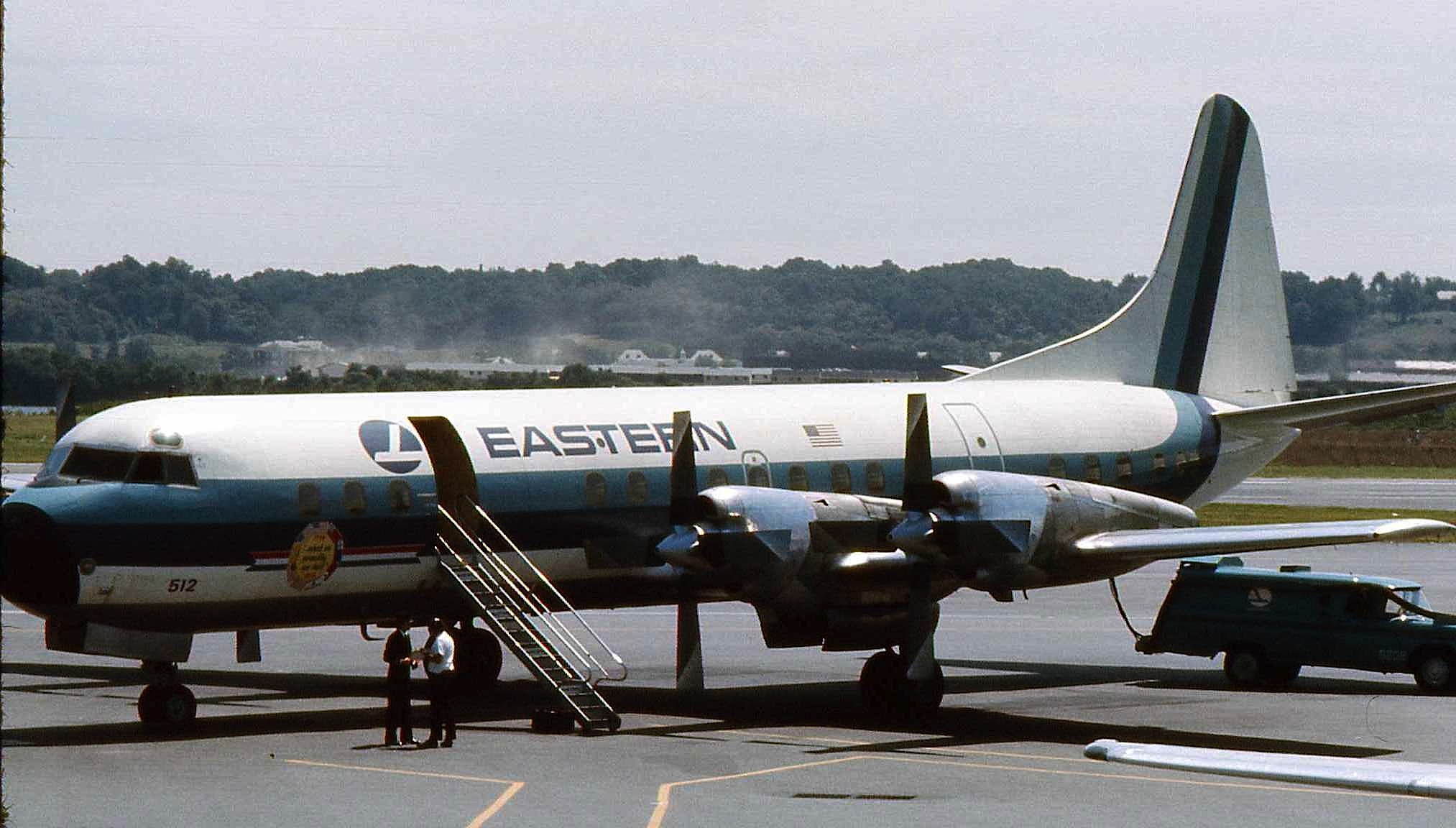
An Eastern Air Lines Electra, at Washington National Airport in 1975

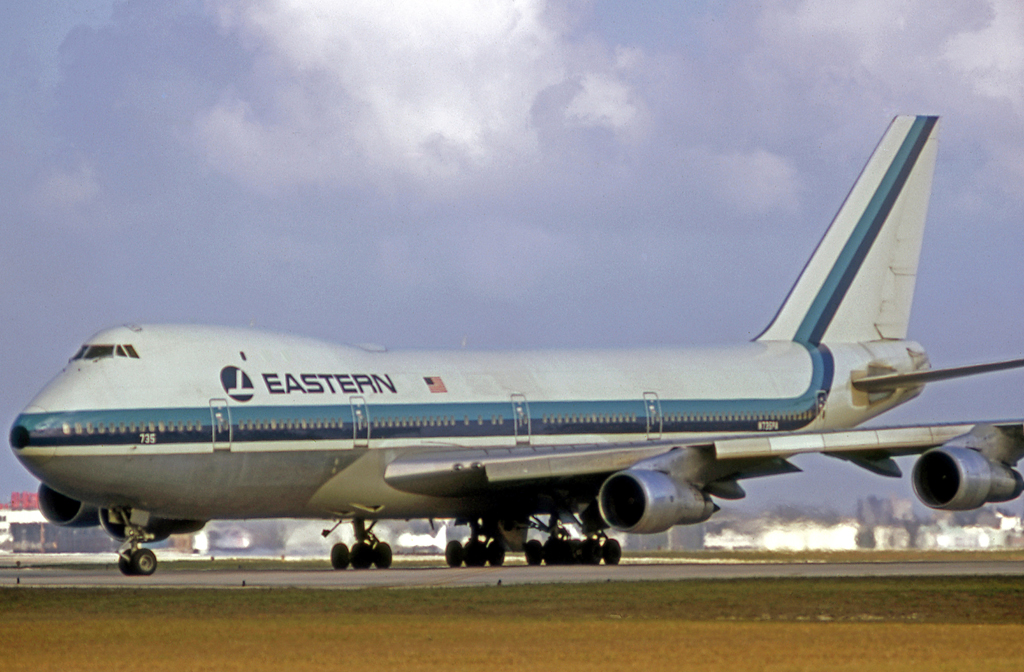
A Boeing 747 showing Eastern Airlines' longtime livery of a cheatline extended up the tail in 1971

In November 1959, Eastern Air Lines opened its Chester L. Churchill-designed Terminal 1 at New York City's Idlewild International Airport, later renamed John F. Kennedy International Airport. In 1960, Eastern's first jets, Douglas DC-8-21s, started to take over the longer flights, like the non-stops from Chicago and New York City to Miami. The DC-8s were joined in 1962 by the Boeing 720 and in 1964 by the Boeing 727-100, which Eastern (along with American Airlines and United Airlines) had helped Boeing to develop. On February 1, 1964, Eastern was the first airline to fly the 727. Shortly after that, a new image was adopted, the famous hockey stick design, officially Caribbean Blue over Ionosphere Blue. Eastern was also the first US carrier to fly the Airbus A300 and the launch customer for the Boeing 757.

On April 30, 1961, Eastern inaugurated Eastern Air Lines Shuttle. Initially 95-seat Lockheed Constellation 1049s and 1049Cs left New York-LaGuardia every two hours, 8 am to 10 pm, to Washington National and to Boston. Flights soon became hourly, 7 am to 10 pm out of each city. No reservations or tickets were required; passengers could pay their fare in cash on board the flight. If a plane filled up at departure time, another plane was rolled out to carry any extra passengers.

Internationalization began as Eastern opened routes to markets such as Santo Domingo and Nassau, Bahamas. Services from San Juan, Puerto Rico's Luis Muñoz Marín International Airport were expanded. In 1967, Eastern purchased Mackey Airlines, a small air carrier primarily operating in Florida and the Bahamas as part of this expansion. In 1973, Eastern purchased Caribair (Puerto Rico), a small airline based in Puerto Rico which operated McDonnell Douglas DC-9-30 jets in the Caribbean.

Eastern bought the Lockheed L-1011 TriStar and Airbus A300 widebody jets; the former would become known in the Caribbean as El Grandote (the huge one). Although Eastern had purchased four Boeing 747s, the delivery slots were sold to Trans World Airlines (TWA) when Eastern decided to purchase the L-1011.

Because of massive delays in the L-1011 program, mainly due to problems with the Rolls-Royce RB211 engines, Eastern leased two Boeing 747-100s from Pan Am between 1970 and 1972 and operated the aircraft between Chicago and San Juan as well as from New York to Miami and San Juan.

The RB211 programme might easily have foundered in 1971 if it had not been for the steadfast support of Eastern Airlines, one of the major launch customers for the Lockheed TriStars. The President of Eastern was Sam Higginbottom, who never wavered and thereby acquired some criticism.

— Stanley Hooker

Just before Walt Disney World opened in 1971, Eastern became its "official airline". It remained the official airline of Walt Disney World and sponsored a ride at the Magic Kingdom park (If You Had Wings in Tomorrowland where Buzz Lightyear's Space Ranger Spin is currently located) until its contracting route network forced Disney to switch to Delta shortly before Eastern's 1989 bankruptcy filing.

The famous "Wings of Man" campaign in the late 1960s was created by advertising agency Young & Rubicam, and restored Eastern's tarnished image until the late 1970s, when former astronaut Frank Borman became president and it was replaced by a new campaign, "We Have To Earn Our Wings Every Day". The new campaign, which featured Borman as a spokesperson, was used until the mid-to-late 1980s.

=== Turmoil ===
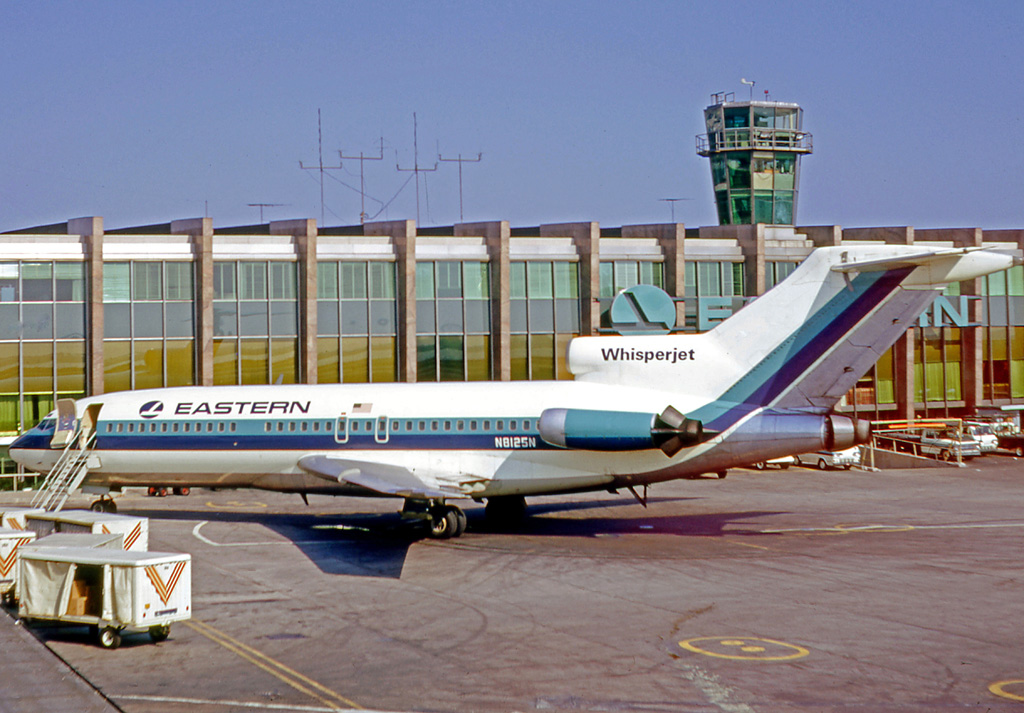
An Eastern Boeing 727-25 outside the terminal at John F Kennedy Airport in 1970

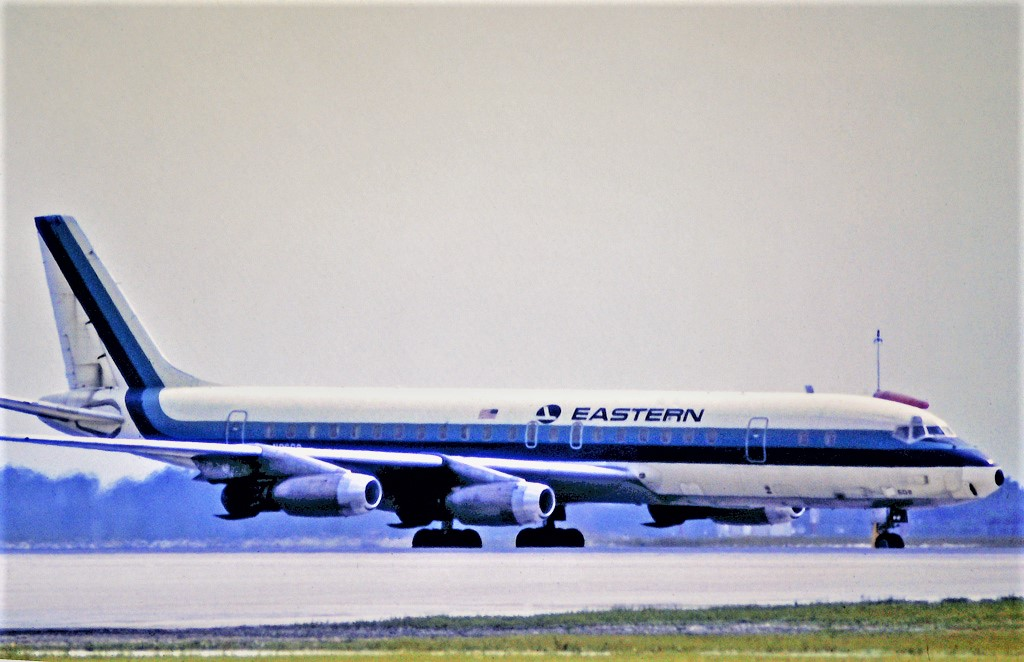
An Eastern Douglas DC-8-21 at Miami International Airport in 1970

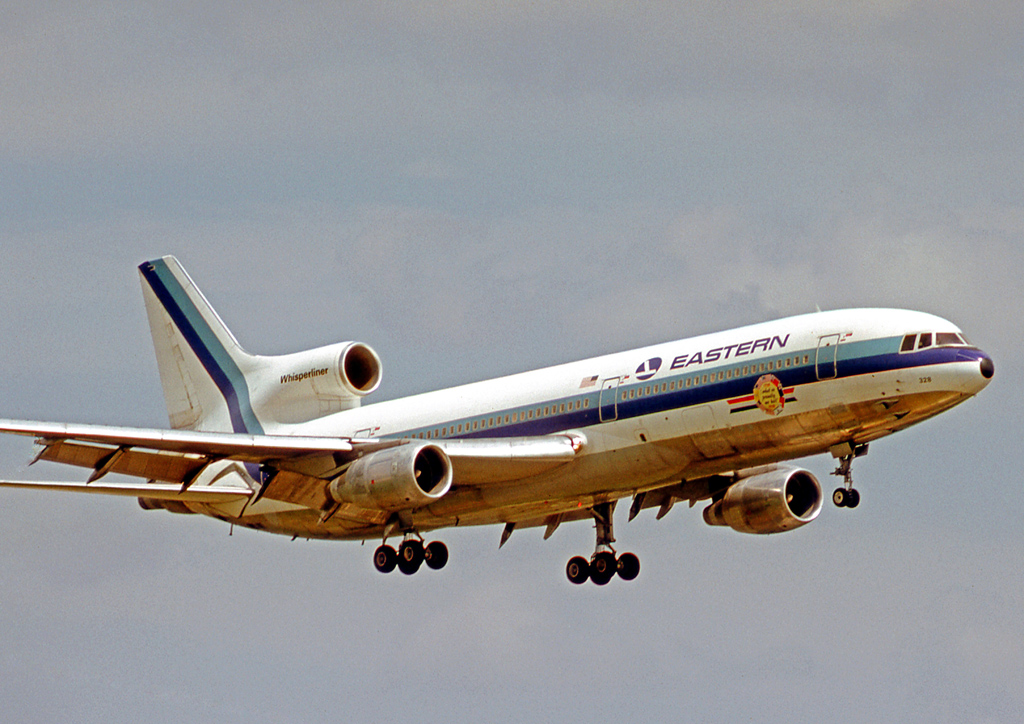
Eastern's Lockheed TriStar Whisperliner landing at Miami in 1976

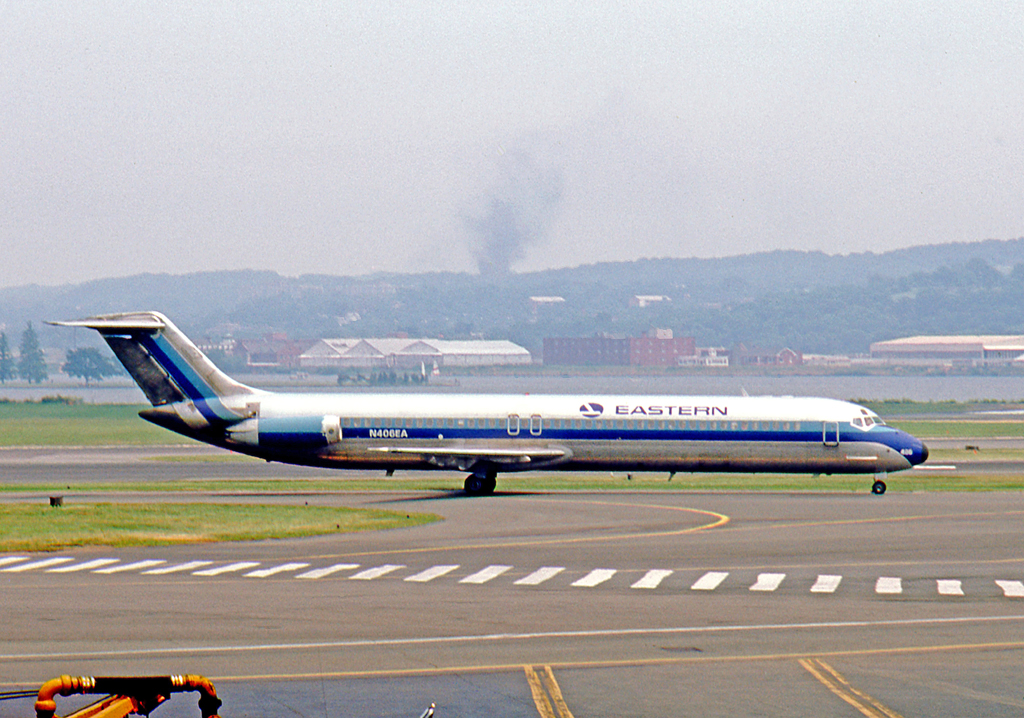
A 1982 photo of a McDonnell Douglas DC-9, a stretched DC-9-51 model, which served Eastern from 1965 until the airline's closure

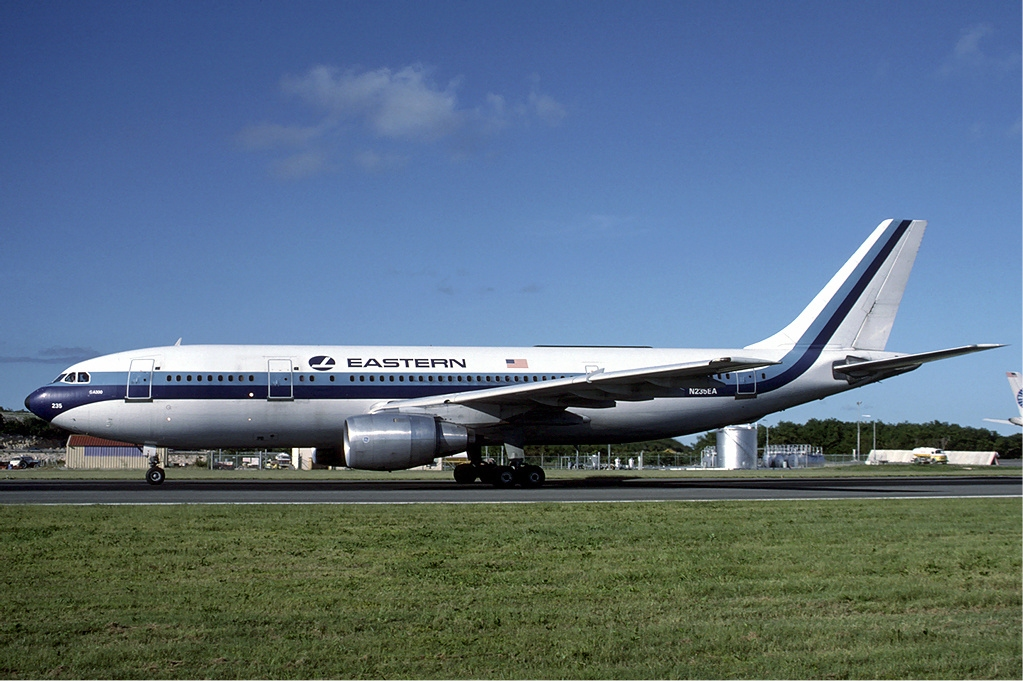
A Eastern Airbus A300 at Saint Maarten in 1986

In 1975, Eastern was headquartered at 10 Rockefeller Plaza in Manhattan. After Frank Borman became president of Eastern Air Lines in late 1975, he moved Eastern's headquarters from Rockefeller Center to Miami-Dade County, Florida.

Eastern's massive Atlanta hub was in direct competition with Delta Air Lines, where the two carriers competed heavily to neither's benefit. Delta's less-unionized work force and slowly expanding international route network helped lead it through the turbulent period following deregulation in 1978.

In 1980, a Caribbean hub was started at Luis Muñoz Marín International Airport (known at the time as "Isla Verde International Airport") near San Juan, Puerto Rico. In 1982, Eastern acquired Braniff's South American route network. By 1985, Eastern was the largest ATA airline in terms of passengers and operated in 26 countries on three continents.

During this era, Eastern's fleet was split between their "silver-colored hockey stick" livery (the lack of paint reduced weight by 100 pounds) and their "white-colored hockey stick" livery (on its Airbus-manufactured planes, which required paint to cover the aircraft's composite skin panels).

In 1983, Eastern became the launch customer of Boeing's 757, which was ordered in 1978. Borman felt that its low cost of operation would make it an invaluable asset to the airline in the years to come. Lower oil prices failed to materialize and the debt created by this purchase coupled with the Airbus A300 purchases in 1977 contributed to the February 1986 sale to Frank Lorenzo's Texas Air. At that time, Eastern was paying over $700,000 in interest each day before they sold a ticket, fueled, or boarded a single aircraft.

Starting about 1985, Eastern offered "Moonlight Specials", with passenger seats on overnight flights scheduled for cargo from thirty freight companies. The flights, which operated between midnight and 7 am, served 18 cities in the United States connecting mainly to Houston (IAH). Eric Schmitt of The New York Times said that the services were "a hybrid of late-night, red-eye flights and the barebones People Express approach to service". The holds of the aircraft were reserved for cargo such as express mail, machine tool parts, and textiles. Because of this, the airline allowed each passenger to take up to two carry-on bags. The airline charged $10 for each checked bag, which was shipped standby. The airline charged between 50 cents and $3 for beverages and snacks. An Eastern flight attendant quoted in The New York Times said that the passengers on the special flights were "a cross section of families, college kids, illegal aliens and weirdos from L.A."

Eastern began losing money as it faced competition from no-frills airlines, such as People Express, which offered lower fares. In an attempt to differentiate itself from its bargain competitors, Eastern began a marketing campaign stressing its quality of service and its rank of highly experienced pilots.

==== Sale to Texas Air ====
Unable to keep up, Borman agreed to the sale of the airline in 1986 to Texas Air, led by Frank Lorenzo, which had already purchased Continental Airlines and lost a bidding war for TWA to Carl Icahn.

In February 1987, the Federal Aviation Administration imposed a $9.5 million fine against Eastern Air Lines for safety violations, which was the largest fine assessed against an airline until American Airlines was fined $24.2 million in 2010. Eastern's FAA violations all occurred prior to the acquisition by Texas Air.

In 1988, Phil Bakes, the president of Eastern Air Lines, announced plans to lay off 4,000 employees and eliminate and reduce service to airports in the Western United States; he said that the airline was going "back to our roots" in the East. At the time, Eastern was the largest corporate employer in the Miami area and remained so after the cuts. John Nordheimer wrote in The New York Times that Eastern's prominence in the Miami area decreased as the city became a finance and trade center with a diversified local economy, instead of one based largely on tourism.

==== Liquidation ====
During Lorenzo's tenure, Eastern was crippled by severe labor unrest that began long before the acquisition. Asked to accept deep cuts in pay and benefits, on March 4, 1989, Lorenzo locked out Eastern's mechanics and ramp service employees, represented by the International Association of Machinists and Aerospace Workers (IAM). Concerned that Lorenzo's successful breaking of the IAM would do the same to the pilots' and flight attendants' unions, the pilots represented by Air Line Pilots Association (ALPA) and flight attendants represented by the Transport Workers Union (TWU) called a sympathy strike, which effectively shut down the airline's domestic operations. Non-contract employees, including airport gate and ticket counter agents and reservation sales agents, could not honor the strike. Due to the lockout and sympathy strike, cancelled flights resulted in the loss of millions of dollars in revenue.

As a result of the strike, a weakened airline structure, high fuel prices, an inability to compete after deregulation and other financial problems, Eastern filed for bankruptcy protection on March 9, which allowed Eastern to continue operating on a smaller scale. Lorenzo initially sought a sale of the entire airline, and on April 6, Eastern agreed to be acquired by former Major League Baseball commissioner Peter Ueberroth for $464 million. However, the transaction was terminated on April 12 after Lorenzo refused to give temporary control to a trustee. The sale process was then terminated on April 18, and Lorenzo proposed a sale of $1.8 million in assets that would allow the airline to continue operating independently.

In May 1989, Eastern sold its East Coast shuttle service to real estate mogul Donald Trump for $365 million. Trump continued operating the service as the Trump Shuttle. In August, Eastern signed a deal to sell sixteen DC-9 aircraft and gates in Philadelphia, Washington, and New York to Midway Airlines for $210 million. In May 1990, American Airlines acquired Eastern's Latin American routes and related assets for $471 million.

After several failed attempts at obtaining creditor approval for restructuring plans, Lorenzo lost control of Eastern in April 1990, when former Continental president Martin Shugrue was appointed as trustee to manage Eastern's reorganization. A report prepared by David Shapiro, an examiner appointed by the bankruptcy court overseeing Eastern's bankruptcy filing, concluded that Eastern was shortchanged by Texas Air in numerous transactions between the two. For example, Texas Air bought assets like System One, a computer reservation operation, from Eastern at a price far below market value. Eastern tried to remain in business in an attempt to correct its cash flow, but to no avail.

Under bankruptcy, Eastern launched a "100 Days" advertising campaign, in which it promised to "become a little bit better every day". The ads were conceived by advertising agency Ogilvy & Mather in New York, and started being broadcast on June 17, 1990, during the prime-time hours in 33 markets around the United States. The ads featured Martin Shugrue, the airline's court-appointed trustee. While the campaign helped the company increase by 73% the number of bookings, it did not stop the company from going bankrupt.

Ultimately, Eastern Airlines stopped flying at midnight on Saturday, January 19, 1991. The previous evening, company agents, unaware of the decision, continued to take reservations and told callers that the airline was not closing. Following the announcement, 5,000 of the 18,000 employees immediately lost their jobs. Of the remaining employees, reservation agents were told to report to work at their regular times, while other employees were told not to report to work unless asked to do so. The Eastern shutdown eliminated many airline industry jobs in the Miami and New York City areas.

Later that month, Delta Air Lines acquired Eastern's gates at Atlanta, and Northwest Airlines acquired Eastern's gates at Washington National.

== Company slogans ==
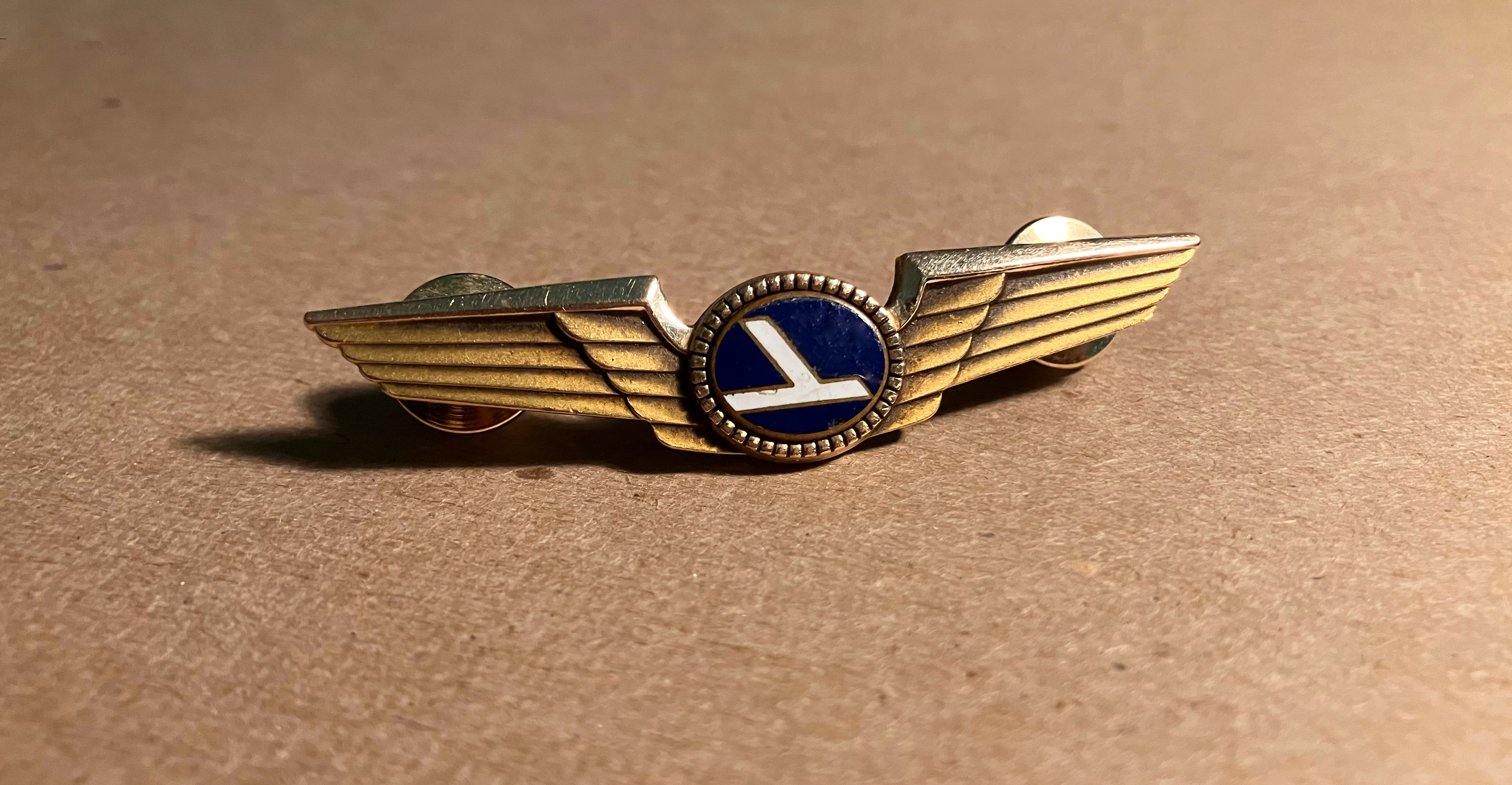
A lapel pin of Eastern Air Lines.

- First in on-time dependability (1963)
- See How Much Better An Airline Can Be (1963-late 1960s)
- We want everyone to fly (1967-late 1960s)
- Number one to the sun (late 1960s)
- Smiling faces going places (1969)
- We earn our wings every day (early 1970s-mid-1980s)
- The wings of man (1970s-mid-1980s)
- Official Airline of Walt Disney World (1971–1987)
- We Have To Earn Our Wings Every Day (1980-mid-1980s)
- We've got your sunshine (mid-1980s)
- America's Favorite way to Fly (Spanish variant: "Su forma favorita de volar") (late 1980s)
- Official Airline of the Tampa Bay Bucs (late 1980s)
- 100 Days (Early 1990–1991)
- The second largest airline in the free world
- Las Alas de America (Spanish 1980–1991)

Revenue Passenger-Miles (Millions)(Scheduled Service Only)
	Eastern	Caribair	Mackey	Midet	Colonial
1951	1630	8	-	-	94
1955	3583	11	8	1	129
1960	4764	27	22	(merged Mackey)	(merged EA)
1965	7956	74	41		
1970	14671	107	(merged EA)		
1975	18169	(merged)			
1981	26501				
1985	33086				
1989	11592				

== Fleet ==
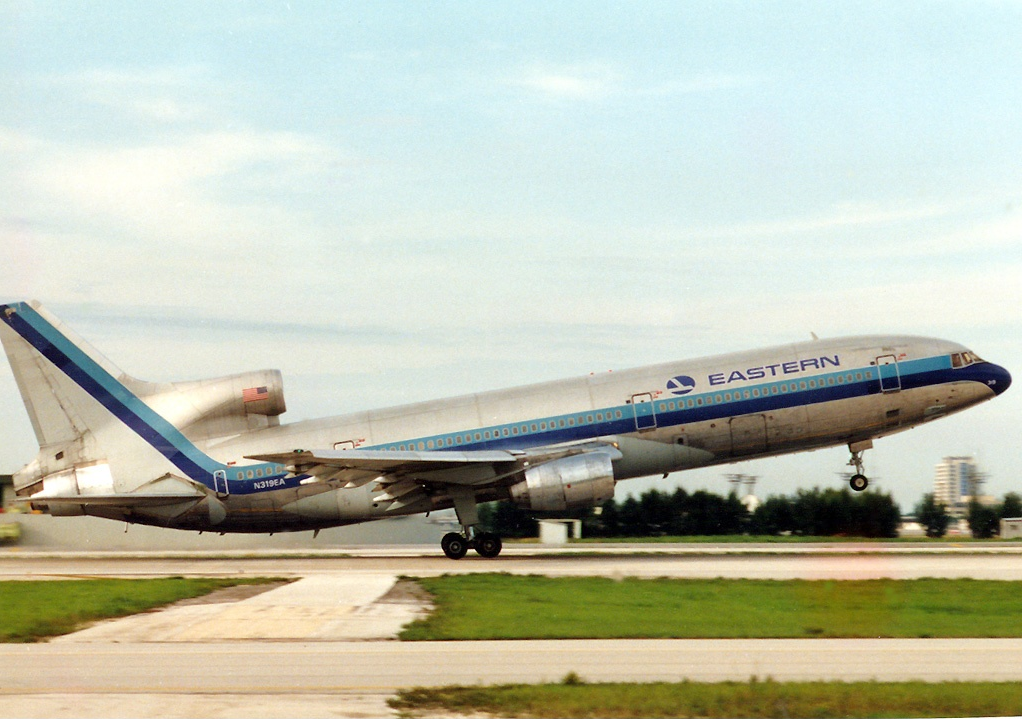
An Eastern Air Lines Lockheed L-1011-1 at Miami International Airport in 1989

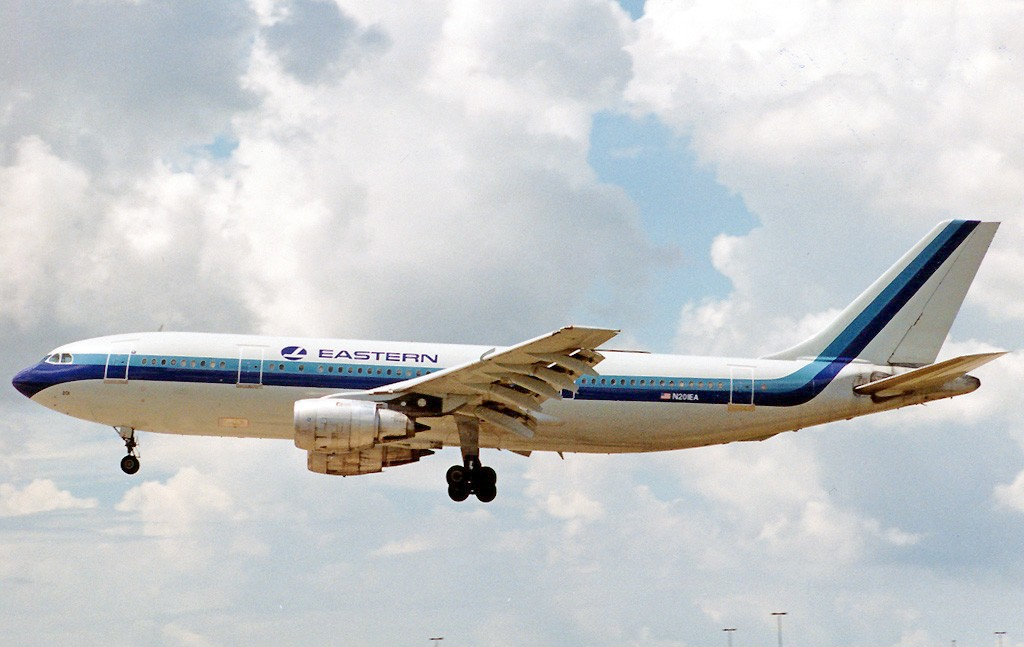
An Eastern Air Lines Airbus A300B4-100 at Miami International Airport in 1990

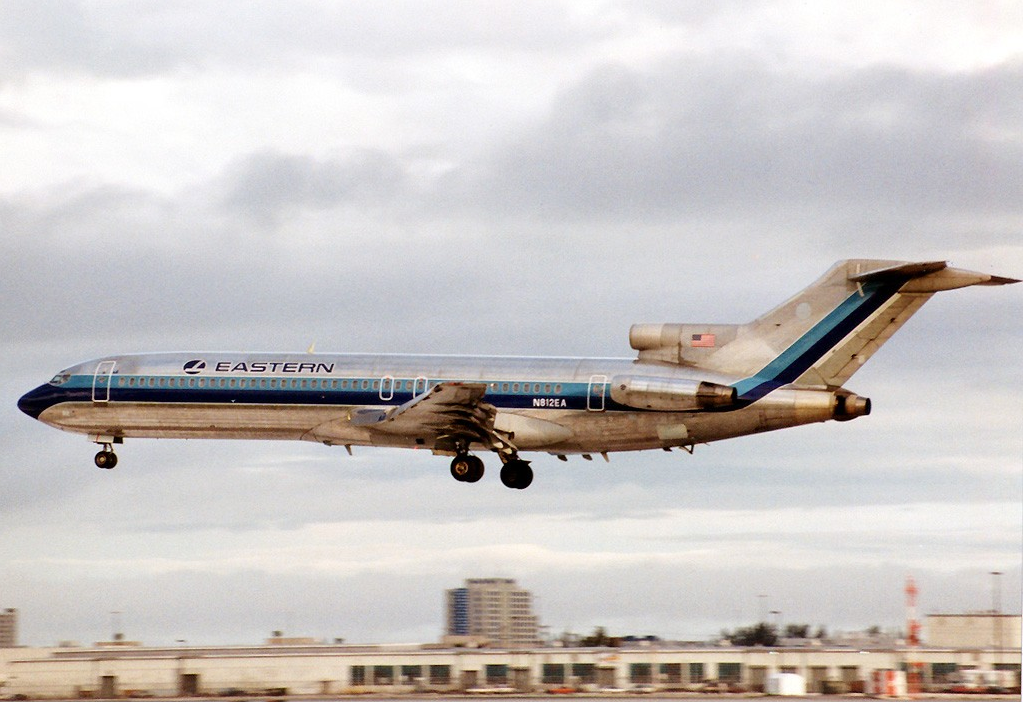
An Eastern Air Lines Boeing 727-200 Advanced at Miami International Airport in 1990

Eastern Air Lines flew many different types of aircraft throughout its history.

Eastern Air Lines historical fleet
Aircraft	Total	Introduced	Retired	Notes
Airbus A300B2	2	1980	1988	
Airbus A300B4	32	1977	1991	First U.S. airline operator of this type
Aero Commander 500B	2	1965	1975	
Boeing 720	15	1961	1970	All returned to Boeing
Boeing 727-100	75	1964	1991	Launch customer
Boeing 727-200/Adv	99	1968	1991	
Boeing 747-100	3	1971	1972	Leased from Pan Am before the L-1011 arrived
Boeing 747-200B	Unknown	Cancelled		For planned services to Europe, bought from Qantas; One aircraft painted but never delivered
Boeing 757-200	25	1983	1991	Launch customer along with British Airways
Breguet 941	1	1968	1968	Demonstration use only
Convair 340	2	1973	1974	
Convair 440	20	1957	1970	
Convair 640	6	1973	1974	
Curtiss C-46 Commando	2	1942	1943	
Curtiss Condor	6	1930	1936	
Curtiss Kingbird	14	1930	1934	
Douglas DC-2	14	1934	1941	
Douglas DC-3	76	1936	1957	
Douglas DC-4	38	1946	1960	
Douglas DC-6	6	1967	1967	
Douglas DC-6B	10	1955	1962	
Douglas DC-7B	54	1953	1966	
Douglas DC-8-21	16	1960	1979	
Douglas DC-8-51	3	1964	1972	
Douglas DC-8-54CF	2	1965	1968	Leased from Capitol Air
Douglas DC-8-61	17	1967	1976	
Douglas DC-8-63PF	6	1969	1974	
Fokker F-10	2	1931	1931	Leased from General Air Lines
Ford Tri-Motor	4	1929	1933	
Kellett KD-1	1	1939	1940	
Lockheed Model 10 Electra	6	1935	1937	
Lockheed L-049 Constellation	10	1956	1958	
Lockheed L-749 Constellation	21	1947	1961	
Lockheed L-1049 Super Constellation	76	1951	1968	
Lockheed L-188 Electra	40	1959	1978	First and only turboprop aircraft flown by Eastern in mainline operation
Lockheed L-1011-1 TriStar	66	1972	1991	Launch customer along with Trans World Airlines. One written off as Eastern Air Lines Flight 401
Lockheed JetStar	2	1970	1973	For corporate use only
Martin 4-0-4	60	1951	1962	Largest operator of the type in operation
McDonnell Douglas DC-9-14	15	1965	1980	
McDonnell Douglas DC-9-31	75	1967	1991	
McDonnell Douglas DC-9-32	7	1987	1991	
McDonnell Douglas DC-9-51	26	1978	1991	
McDonnell Douglas DC-10-30	3	1985	1990	Formerly from Alitalia. Used for long range services to Europe and South America
Pitcairn Mailwing	54	1927	1937	First aircraft to begin operations as Eastern Air Transport Inc.
Rockwell Sabreliner	1	1969	1970	
Travel Air 2000	1	Unknown	Unknown	

== Eastern Express, Eastern Metro Express, Eastern Partner and Caribair ==
Several regional and commuter airlines provided passenger feed for Eastern via code sharing agreements with their aircraft liveries reflecting the Eastern mainline paint scheme. There were a number of brandings including: Eastern Express, Eastern Atlantis Express, and Eastern Metro Express. LIAT, a Caribbean-based airline, also operated Eastern Partner service.

Eastern Express air carriers and their aircraft included:

- Air Midwest operating Fairchild Swearingen Metroliner (Metro II model) turboprops
- Atlantis Airlines operating British Aerospace BAe Jetstream 31, de Havilland Canada DHC-6 Twin Otter, and Fairchild Swearingen Metroliner turboprops
- Bar Harbor Airlines operating ATR-42, Beechcraft 1900C, Beechcraft 99, and Saab 340A turboprops
- Metro Airlines operating de Havilland Canada DHC-6 Twin Otter turboprops
- Precision Airlines operating Dornier 228 turboprops
- Provincetown-Boston Airlines (PBA) operating Douglas DC-3 prop aircraft
- Sunaire (Aviation Associates), a division of Metro Airlines operating de Havilland Canada DHC-6 Twin Otter turboprops

Eastern Atlantis Express was operated by Atlantis Airlines with BAe Jetstream 31 aircraft.

Eastern Metro Express was operated by Metro Airlines and was based at Eastern's Atlanta (ATL) hub operating British Aerospace BAe Jetstream 31 and de Havilland Canada DHC-8-100 Dash 8 turboprops.

Eastern Partner was operated by a Caribbean-based airline, Leeward Islands Air Transport, with turboprop service between Eastern's San Juan hub and Antigua, St. Kitts and St. Maarten.

Eastern also worked closely with another Caribbean-based airline, Caribair (Puerto Rico). The June 13, 1967, Eastern system timetable lists connecting flights operated by Caribair Convair 640 turboprops with service between Eastern's San Juan hub and St. Croix and St. Thomas. By 1970, San Juan-based Caribair had become an all-jet airline operating McDonnell Douglas DC-9-30 aircraft serving fourteen Caribbean islands as well as Miami with the air carrier subsequently being acquired by Eastern in 1973.

== Accidents and incidents ==
=== Fatal accidents ===
- August 10, 1937, Trip 7, a Douglas DC-2 (NC13739), crashed on takeoff at Daytona Beach Municipal Airport after it struck a utility pylon during a nighttime take off, killing four of nine on board.
- February 26, 1941, Flight 21, a Douglas DST, crashed near Atlanta in fog due to a misread altimeter, almost killing Eddie Rickenbacker, who was traveling on airline business. His recovery in the hospital received broad press coverage; during his initial recovery, several incorrect news reports claimed that he had died. Of 16 on board, 8 died, including Congressman William D. Byron. Clara Savage Littledale, editor of Parents magazine, survived. Littledale recounted her experience of the crash for Parents. Her husband, Pulitzer Prize–winning journalist Harold A. Littledale, was paralyzed as a result of the crash.
- July 12, 1945: Flight 45, a Douglas DC-3-201C (NC25647) flying from Washington, DC to Columbia, SC, collided in mid-air with USAAF A-26C Invader near Florence, South Carolina. The A-26 lost control and crashed; two crew parachuted but only one survived. The DC-3 executed a forced landing in a cornfield, killing one passenger, a two-year-old boy.
- September 7, 1945: Flight 42, a Douglas DC-3-201G (NC33631), crashed near Florence, South Carolina following an unexplained fire in the rear of the aircraft. Control was lost after the right elevator also caught fire and the aircraft crashed in a swampy, wooded area, killing all 22 on board.
- December 30, 1945: Flight 14, a Douglas DC-3-201 (NC18123), overran the runway while landing at LaGuardia Airport after approaching too high and too fast, killing one of 14 of board.
- January 18, 1946: Flight 105, a Douglas DC-3-201E (NC19970), crashed at Cheshire, Connecticut after a loss of control caused by wing separation, killing all 17 on board. A fire, caused by a fuel leak, started in the left engine and spread to the wing, causing it to collapse and fail.
- January 12, 1947: Flight 665, a Douglas C-49 (NC88872), crashed at Galax, Virginia after the pilot deviated from the flight route, killing 18 of 19 on board.
- May 30, 1947: Flight 605, a Douglas DC-4 en route from Newark to Miami, crashed near Bainbridge, Maryland, killing all 53 aboard. At the time, Flight 605 was the deadliest crash in United States aviation history. "Loss of control" was cited as the reason for the crash.
- January 13, 1948: Flight 572, a Douglas DC-3-201F (NC28384), crashed at Oxon Hill, Maryland after striking trees while on approach to Washington National Airport, killing five of nine on board; the aircraft was flying too low.
- February 7, 1948: Flight 611, a Lockheed L-649 Constellation (NC112A), suffered a propeller blade separation over the Atlantic Ocean 156 mi off Brunswick, Georgia. Three hours after takeoff, the number three propeller failed and a portion of a blade penetrated the fuselage, cutting control cables, electrical wires and engine controls and killing a crew member before exiting the fuselage on the opposite side. After this the front portion of the number three engine broke free and fell off. A rapid descent was initiated. At 12,000 feet the descent was stopped. Due to instrument failure the aircraft descended visually to 1,000 feet. On landing the number four engine was shut down and the brakes applied hard, which blew out a tire. Fires started in the landing gear and number four engine but were quickly extinguished. Despite the damage, the aircraft was repaired and returned to service.
- November 1, 1949: Flight 537, a Douglas DC-4 (N88727) on approach to Washington National Airport, collided in mid-air with a Lockheed P-38 Lightning being test-flown for acceptance by the Government of Bolivia, killing all 55 aboard the DC-4 and seriously injuring the pilot of the P-38. At the time it was the deadliest airliner crash in United States history.
- October 19, 1953: A Lockheed L-749A Constellation (N119A) from Idlewild International Airport to San Juan, Puerto Rico, crashed shortly after takeoff, killing two of 27 on board.
- December 21, 1955: A Lockheed L-749A Constellation (N112A) crashed on approach to Jacksonville's Imeson Airport arriving from Miami, with further scheduled stops at Washington, DC, New York and Boston. Twelve passengers and a crew of five were killed.
- October 4, 1960: Flight 375 (a Lockheed L-188 Electra) departing Boston's Logan International Airport for Philadelphia crashed on takeoff after striking a flock of birds. Sixty-two of the 72 passengers and crew were killed.
- November 30, 1962: Flight 512 (a Douglas DC-7) crashed during a go around after failing to land due to fog at Idlewild Airport (now JFK) in New York City. Of the 51 passengers and crew on board, 25 were killed.
- February 25, 1964: Flight 304 (a Douglas DC-8) flying from New Orleans International Airport to Washington-National Airport crashed into Lake Pontchartrain en route due to "degradation of aircraft stability characteristics in turbulence, because of abnormal longitudinal trim component positions". All 51 passengers and seven crew aboard were killed.
- February 8, 1965: Flight 663, a Douglas DC-7 departing from New York City to Richmond, Virginia, crashed at Jones Beach State Park after takeoff from JFK when it was forced to evade inbound Pan Am Flight 212. All 84 on board died. The evasive action was blamed for causing the plane to lose control.
- December 4, 1965: Flight 853, a Lockheed L-1049C Super Constellation, collided with TWA Flight 42, a Boeing 707, over Carmel, New York. The Constellation crashed on Hunt Mountain in North Salem, New York, killing four of 53 on board while the 707 landed safely with no casualties.
- December 29, 1972: Flight 401 (a brand new Lockheed L-1011) was preparing to land in Miami, when the flight crew became distracted by a non-functioning gear light. The flight crashed in the Everglades, killing 101 of 176 on board. This was the first major crash of a widebody jet aircraft.
- September 11, 1974: Flight 212, a Douglas DC-9-31 carrying 78 passengers and four crew, crashed while conducting an instrument approach in dense ground fog at Douglas Municipal Airport. The aircraft crashed just short of the runway, killing 72; three survivors subsequently died from their injuries. Killed on this flight were James, Peter, and Paul Colbert, the father and older brothers (respectively) of comedian Stephen Colbert.
- June 24, 1975: Flight 66, a Boeing 727, crashed into runway approach lights as it penetrated a thunderstorm near the ILS localizer course line at JFK in New York City, killing 113 passengers and crew. The official cause of the accident was a sudden high rate of descent, caused by severe downdrafts from the thunderstorm, and the continued use of the runway despite the hazardous weather. ABA basketball star Wendell Ladner was one of the passengers killed in the crash.
- January 1, 1985: Flight 980, a Boeing 727 struck Mount Illimani on a flight from Silvio Pettirossi International Airport in Asunción, Paraguay, to El Alto International Airport in La Paz, Bolivia. All 19 passengers and 10 crew were killed on impact.

=== Non-fatal accidents and incidents ===
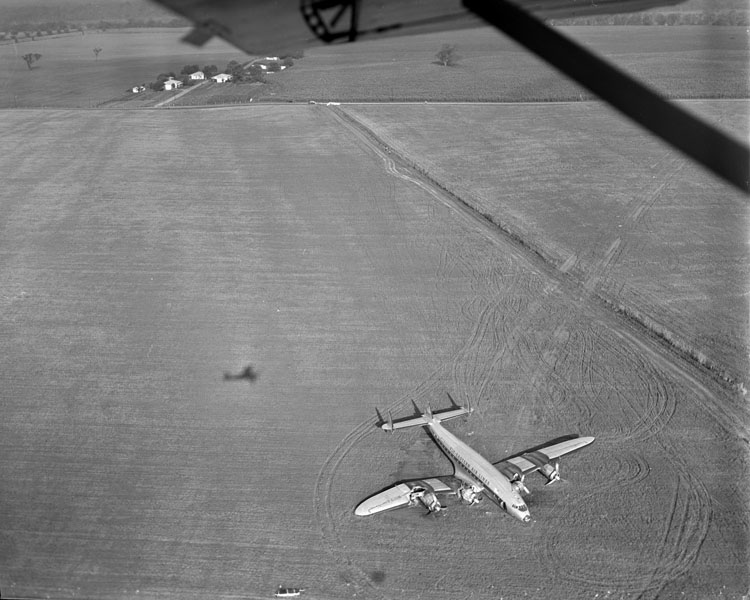
Flight 601, the subject of a July 19, 1951, incident

- December 19, 1936: A Douglas DC-2-112 (NC13732) struck trees and crashed near Milford, Connecticut due to pilot error and radio problems; all 11 on board survived. The aircraft was leased from North American Aviation.
- October 18, 1938: A Douglas DC-2-112 (NC13735) had engine failure while taking off from Montgomery, Alabama. The engine caught fire and fell from the plane. The plane struck a tree upon landing in a field just a few miles from the airport. All 13 on board, including the crew of 3, survived with only the Captain, John David Hissong, sustaining minor burns.
- April 3, 1941: A Douglas DC-3-201B (NC21727) crashed into water off Vero Beach, Florida during a storm; although all 16 on board were injured, none were killed. The aircraft was written off.
- November 19, 1943: Trip 12, a Douglas DC-3-201E (NC19968), made an emergency landing at New Orleans en route from Houston after the pilot allowed the aircraft to descend too low during the second attempt to land. The number one propeller hit the water, causing portions of the engine and cowling to break off. All 15 on board survived. The aircraft was repaired and returned to service.
- October 11, 1946: Flight 546, a Douglas C-54B (NC88729), struck a ridge near Alexandria, Virginia while on approach to Washington National Airport; all 26 on board survived. During the approach, the aircraft had descended too low.
- December 19, 1946: Flight 605, a Douglas C-54B (NC88813) collided in mid-air with Universal Air Lines Flight 7, a Douglas C-47 (NC54374), near Aberdeen, Maryland. The C-47 departed Newark for Raleigh, while the C-54 departed Newark 15 minutes later for a non-stop flight to Miami. Near Aberdeen the C-54 flew past the C-47. The C-54 co-pilot saw the lights of an aircraft close and to the left of the C-54, which turned out to be the C-47. The C-54 pilot rolled into a right bank and forcefully pulled up the nose, causing the rear of the C-54 to strike the forward top portion of the C-47. The C-47 landed safely at Philips Army Air Field while the C-54 diverted to Washington. There were no casualties on either aircraft and both aircraft were repaired and returned to service.
- January 21, 1948: Flight 604, a Lockheed L-649 Constellation (NC111A), crashed into a snow bank while landing at Logan International Airport following a loss of control due to a snow-covered runway; all 25 on board survived.
- July 19, 1951: Flight 601, a Lockheed L-749A Constellation (N119A), suffered severe buffeting after an access door opened in flight. A flapless wheels-up landing was made at Curles Neck Farm, Virginia. The aircraft was later repaired and returned to service.
- November 27, 1951: Flight 167, a Douglas DC-3-201C (N25646) collided in mid-air with Civil Air Patrol Piper L-4J 45-5151 near Ocala, Florida. The Piper was climbing after a left turn when it struck the DC-3. The DC-3's number one propeller made several cuts in the Piper's left wing, causing a loss of control and the Piper crashed, killing the pilot. The DC-3 circled the airport for a few minutes before landing safely with no casualties.
- September 6, 1953: An L-1049 Super Constellation (N6214C) crashed on landing at McChord Air Force Base due to a hydraulic failure caused by engine problems; all 32 on board survived.
- May 8, 1954: Eastern Air Lines Flight 2634W made an emergency landing at Naval Auxiliary Air Station Edenton (now Northeastern Regional Airport)in Edenton, NC. All crew and passengers survived. This is according to a letter written by chairman of the board, Eddie Rickenbacker to Marine Air Base Squadron 14.
- February 17, 1956: Eastern Air Lines Flight 156 crashed near Owensboro, Kentucky, due to pilot error; all 23 on board survived. The aircraft stalled and crashed following an improperly executed final approach.
- March 10, 1957: A Martin 4-0-4 (N453A) crashed on landing at Standiford Field due to pilot error; all 34 on board survived. A portion of the left wing separated inboard of the number one engine due to excessive sink rate caused by the pilot's landing approach technique.
- June 28, 1957: A Douglas DC-7B (N808D) had just returned from a training flight and was taxiing to the maintenance hangar at Miami International Airport when it collided with a parked Eastern Air Lines L-1049 Super Constellation (N6212C) near the hangar. Fuel leaked and both aircraft caught fire and burned out.
- March 17, 1958: A Martin 4-0-4 (N496A) (Flight # unknown) on final approach to Melbourne Municipal Airport in Melbourne, Florida, struck an unmarked pile of gravel at the approach end of the runway. During the landing roll the landing gear collapsed, and the aircraft caught fire and burned. All 10 occupants (3 crew, 7 passengers) evacuated safely.
- October 18, 1966: A Lockheed L-1049C Super Constellation (N6219C) caught fire during refueling at Miami after a fuel line ruptured, causing substantial damage to the wing. The aircraft was written off, and broken up in June 1967.
- May 18, 1972: Flight 346, a Douglas DC-9-31 (N8961E) landed hard at Fort Lauderdale International Airport, collapsing the landing gear and breaking off the tail; all ten on board survived.
- November 27, 1973: Flight 300, a McDonnell Douglas DC-9-31 inbound from Pittsburgh International Airport to Akron-Canton Airport landed too far down the runway, hydroplaned and went off the end of the runway and over an embankment in fog, low ceilings, light rain and 1.5 mile visibility. The aircraft was severely damaged and written off. All 26 on board (5 crew, 21 passengers) survived with various injuries.
- July 2, 1976: A Lockheed L-188 Electra (N5531) was blown up on the ground by a bomb at Logan International Airport.
- September 26, 1978: Eastern Air Lines Flight 75, an L-1011, overtook Air Caribbean Flight 309, a Beech 18, on approach to Isla Verde International Airport in San Juan, Puerto Rico. There were no injuries on the Eastern airplane, but all six occupants on the Air Caribbean plane were killed when it plummeted and crashed on to a local bar. Eastern Airlines and the FAA later settled with family members of the six dead people as well as injured bar clients, paying them almost $5,700,000 for damages.
- May 5, 1983: Flight 855, a Lockheed L-1011 TriStar, had all three engines shut down in flight. The pilot restarted one of the engines before returning to Miami International Airport. All 172 on board survived.
- April 21, 1984: Eastern Air Lines Flight 494, a DC-9, suffered an uncommanded deployment of reverse thrust during a flight from Hartsfield-Jackson Atlanta International Airport (ATL) to Piedmont Triad International Airport (GSO) in Greensboro, North Carolina, causing the aircraft to roll quickly to the right. The flight crew disabled the affected engine and returned safely to Atlanta. The pilots received the Air Line Pilots Association's Superior Airmanship Award for their handling of the incident.
- September 15, 1987: Flight 216, a Boeing 727 (N8857E), was seriously damaged in a hard landing in severe winds at Tulsa International Airport; the 55 passengers and 7 crew were not injured. The aircraft was inspected by mechanics at the American Airlines Tulsa maintenance base and cleared to fly; it was then flown to Kansas City and Chicago with passengers, only to be removed from service after skin wrinkles in the fuselage were noticed. A senior American Airlines official later conceded that the Tulsa mechanics "erred" in their inspection.
- December 27, 1987: Flight 573, a Douglas DC-9-31 (N8948E), landed hard at Pensacola Regional Airport. The nose gear touched down first, and the aircraft bounced and touched down again, breaking the passenger cabin aft of the wings. The plane stopped with its tail resting on the runway but all 103 passengers and 4 crew survived.
- January 18, 1990: Eastern Air Lines Flight 111, a Boeing 727 (N8867E), collided with an Epps Air Service Beechcraft King Air upon landing at Atlanta-William B. Hartsfield International Airport, Georgia. The plane received substantial damage, but all 149 passengers and 8 crew members survived unharmed. The plane was later repaired. The King Air was destroyed, with the pilot killed and the first officer seriously injured.

=== Hijackings ===
- July 24, 1961: Flight 202, a Lockheed L-188 Electra, was hijacked to Cuba. A fighter plane from Homestead AFB followed the airliner until it reached Cuban airspace.
- September 20, 1968: Flight 950, a Boeing 720, was hijacked to Cuba.
- February 3, 1969: Flight 7 was hijacked to Cuba. The presence of Candid Camera host Allen Funt on the flight led many of the passengers to conclude that the hijacking was actually a prank. Funt and others were later released after 11 hours of captivity.
- March 17, 1970: Both pilots of Eastern Air Lines Shuttle Flight 1320, a DC-9-31 carrying 68 passengers and 5 crew, were shot by a deranged hijacker. The first officer was able to take the hijacker's gun and shoot him three times before succumbing to his own wounds. Despite gunshot wounds in both arms, the captain was able to fight off the wounded hijacker and land the aircraft safely.

== Leadership ==
Presidents and chairman of Eastern were:

=== President ===
1. Edward Vernon Rickenbacker, April 18, 1938 – August 10, 1953
2. Thomas F. Armstrong, August 10, 1953 – October 1, 1959
3. Malcolm Ames MacIntyre, October 1, 1959 – December 16, 1963
4. Floyd D. Hall, December 16, 1963 – December 13, 1967
5. Arthur Dee Lewis, December 12, 1967 – March 1, 1969
6. Floyd D. Hall, March 1, 1969 – December 15, 1970
7. Samuel Logan Higginbottom, December 15, 1970 – October 1, 1973
8. Floyd D. Hall, October 1, 1973 – May 27, 1975
9. Frank Frederick Borman II, May 27, 1975 – September 24, 1985
10. Joseph B. Leonard, September 24, 1985 – October 17, 1986
11. Philip John Bakes Jr., October 17, 1986 – April 20, 1990
12. Robert L. Gould, December 11, 1990 – January 18, 1991

=== Chairman of the Board ===
1. Edward Vernon Rickenbacker, August 10, 1953 – December 29, 1963
2. Floyd D. Hall, December 13, 1967 – December 15, 1976
3. Frank Frederick Borman II, December 15, 1976 – July 1, 1986
4. Francisco Anthony Lorenzo, October 17, 1986 – April 19, 1990

== New Eastern Air Lines ==
In 2011, a group purchased the intellectual property, including trademarks, of Eastern Air Lines and formed the Eastern Air Lines Group. The group announced in early 2014 that it had filed an application with the United States Department of Transportation for a Certificate of Public Convenience and Necessity, which will be followed by certification with the Federal Aviation Administration. The new airline began service through charter and wet-lease flights out of Miami International in late 2014 with Boeing 737-800 jetliners painted in the classic Eastern "hockey stick" livery. The IATA and ICAO codes of the original airline, as well as its callsign, were used by the new iteration of Eastern Air Lines. After a sale to Swift Air, the trademarks were passed on to Eastern Airlines, LLC in 2018. On January 12, 2020, after nearly two decades of being officially defunct, the first flight of the renewed Eastern Airlines landed at JFK airport, heralding a new era for the brand name.

== See also ==
- Charles Townsend Ludington, base source of airlines
- List of defunct airlines of the United States
- John McGraw, medical director
