= Gaza war protests in the United States =

Protests relating to the Gaza war

- Part of the Gaza war protests
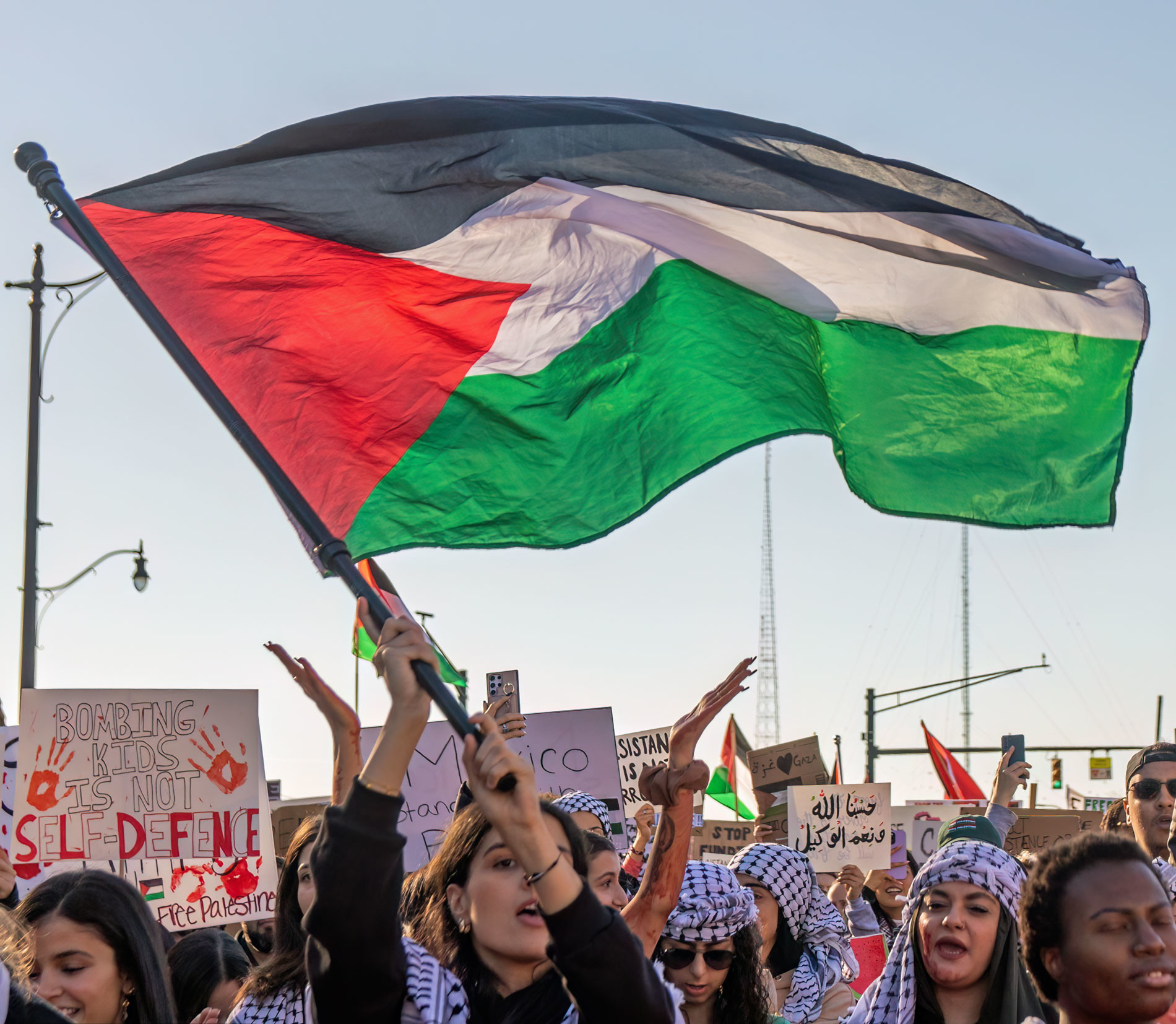
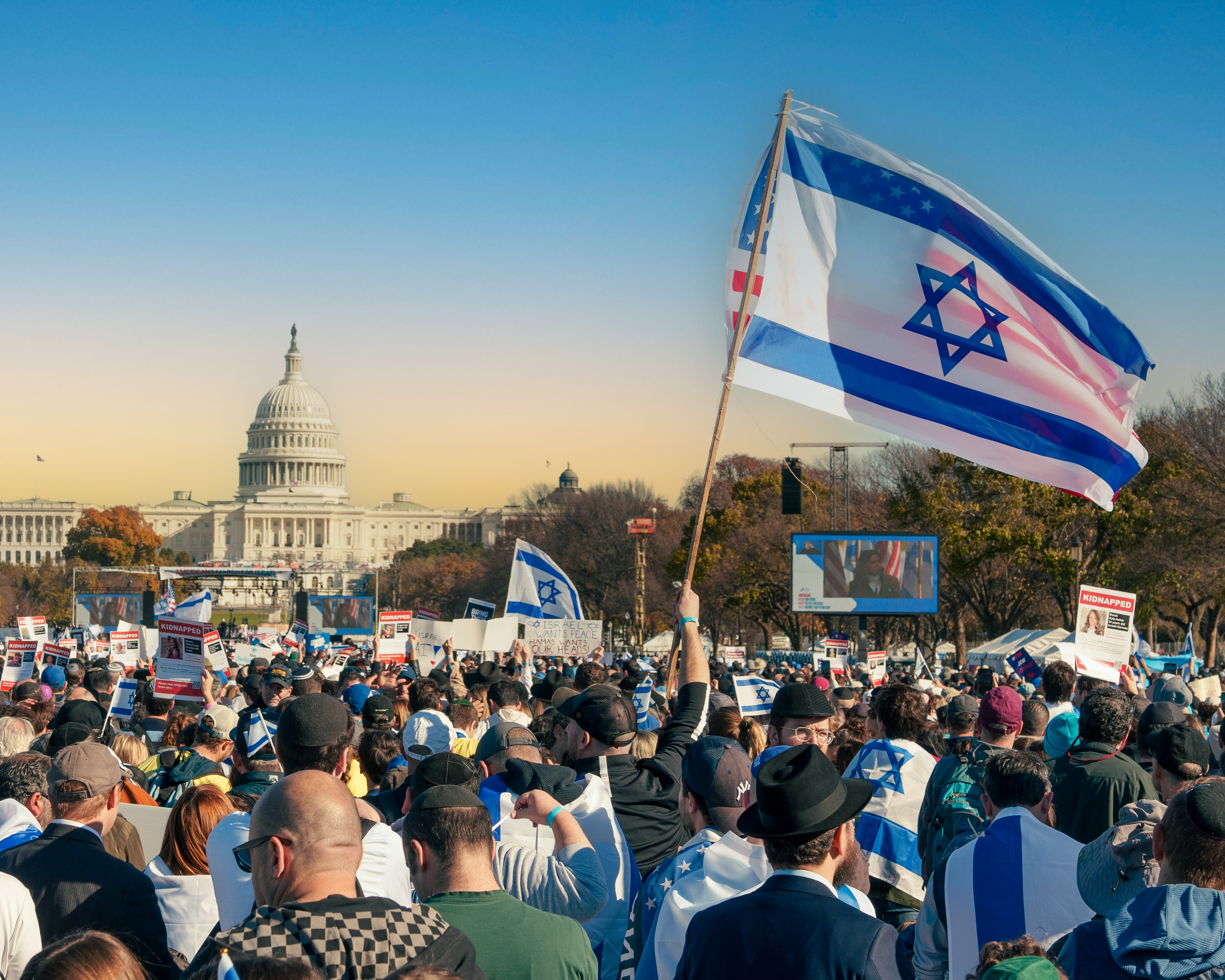
- A Gaza rally in Columbus, Ohio, in November 2023 March for Israel, held in Washington, D.C. on November 14, 2023
- Date: October 8, 2023 – present (3 years, 1 month, 1 week and 2 days)
- Location: United States
- Caused by: Gaza war
- Goals: Varied
- Methods: Protests, demonstrations, civil disobedience, civil disorder, online activism

Casualties
- Deaths: 2 pro-Palestine protesters (Aaron Bushnell and Matt Nelson); 2 pro-Israel protesters (Paul Kessler and Karen Diamond)
- Arrested: 600+

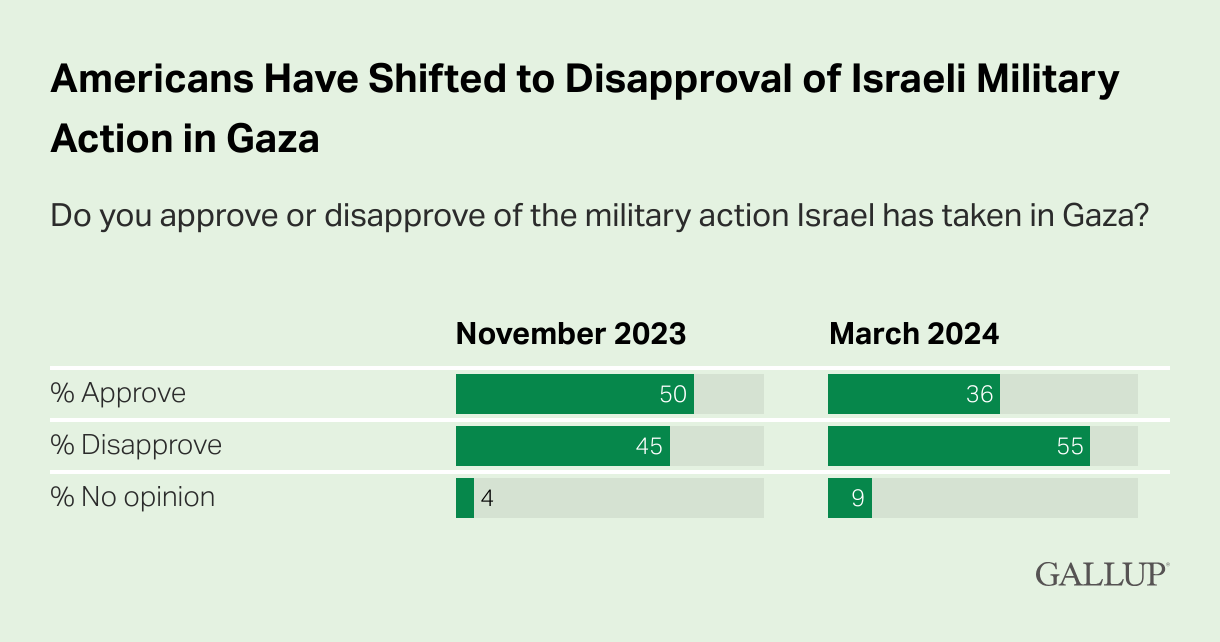
Gallup Poll showing US change from majority approval (Nov. 2023) to majority disapproval (March 2024) of Israeli military action in Gaza

Protests, including rallies, demonstrations, campaigns, and vigils, relating to the Gaza war have occurred nationwide across the United States since the conflict's start on October 7, 2023, occurring as part of a broader phenomenon of Gaza war protests around the world.

In the first ten days of the war, pro-Israeli demonstrations in support of Israel in the wake of the Hamas-led attack and focusing on the Israeli hostage crisis were most common, but they have since been outnumbered by pro-Palestinian anti-war protests calling for a ceasefire and an end to the Israeli occupation. Pro-Palestinian protestors criticized US military and diplomatic support to Israel, Israel's invasion of the Gaza Strip, Israel's genocide of Gazans, and other Israeli war crimes. These protests included Jewish groups and some US administration staffers.

By December 5, more than 1 million Americans had participated in protest over the conflict, across over 2,600 events: 442 in support of Israel, and 2,100 in support of Palestine. An escalation of pro-Palestinian protests on university campuses began on April 17, 2024, and continued into 2025.

Four people have self-immolated in protest of the war: an unidentified woman draped in a Palestinian flag on December 1, 2023, in Atlanta, Georgia, who survived with serious injures; and Aaron Bushnell, a 25-year-old serviceman of the United States Air Force, in Washington, D.C., died in hospital on February 25, 2024. The third by anti-war activist Matt Nelson occurred in Boston in September 2024. The fourth occurred in Washington, D.C., in October 2024.

== National ==
Pro-Palestine protests were held throughout the United States on Black Friday with activists calling to "shut it down" for Palestine. There were protests in Los Angeles; Chicago; Troy, Michigan; Saint Louis, Missouri; Estero, Florida; and many other cities.

As of December 5, according to Harvard's Nonviolent Action Lab and the Crowd Counting Consortium, more than 1 million Americans had participated in protests over the conflict.

"Ceasefire carols" were organized by activists throughout the United States leading up to Christmas 2023. Sarah Abbott who helped organize a carol outside Senator Amy Klobuchar's home was quoted in CBS Minnesota saying, "Our government is funding this genocide, white Christians have historically and currently played major roles in the perpetuation of Zionism, and as people of conscience, we can't stand by silently." Ceasefire carols were sung in Minneapolis, Minnesota; Louisville, Kentucky; Salt Lake City, Utah; and in at least 17 other cities.

On December 27, protesters blocked airports, including at John F. Kennedy International Airport and Los Angeles International Airport.

In February 2024, a joint report by the Center for Constitutional Rights and Palestine Legal found widespread legal attacks against pro-Palestinian activism, describing it as "a dangerous attack on constitutionally protected speech and association".

In response to actions taken by the Biden administration in support of Israeli Prime Minister Benjamin Netanyahu's approach to the war, Muslim and Arab Americans organized a campaign titled "Abandon Biden" to advocate against voting for Biden in the 2024 presidential election. Leaders from the United Electrical Workers and United Auto Workers vowed to use their electoral clout to push for a ceasefire.

On March 31, 2024, USAF airman Larry Hebert, a member of Veterans for Peace, began a hunger strike to bring attention to starving children in Gaza.

The Tax Day protests were held on Tax Day (April 15). After the police crackdown of the 2024 Columbia University pro-Palestinian campus occupation on April 18, Gaza solidarity encampments spread to multiple campuses across the US, including MIT, Washington University in St. Louis, University of Maryland, and Tufts University.

On February 9, 2025, a protester carrying a Palestinian flag interrupted Kendrick Lamar's performance during the Super Bowl LIX halftime show.

=== 2024 presidential election events ===
Following the 2023 Hamas-led attack on Israel and the Gaza humanitarian crisis, President Biden has faced sustained opposition and event disruptions from a vocal minority of progressives, Arab Americans, and Muslims over his handling of the conflict and the creation of a protest vote movement against him.

At a campaign rally in Virginia on January 23, 2024, incumbent president Joe Biden was interrupted more than a dozen times by protesters calling for a ceasefire. The following day, he was interrupted by anti-war protesters in Washington, D.C., during an endorsement rally held by the United Auto Workers. Following these protests, the Biden campaign took "extraordinary" steps to prevent pro-Palestinian protesters from interrupting the president, including avoiding college campuses, hiring private companies to vet attendees, and not disclosing his events' locations ahead of time. On March 10, a protester at a Biden campaign event interrupted his speech, stating, "You're a dictator, genocide Joe. Tens of thousands of Palestinians are dead. Children are dying." Protesters interrupted Biden speaking on healthcare in North Carolina, telling him, "Hospitals in Gaza are being bombed," to which Biden replied, "They have a point. We need to get a lot more care into Gaza."

On March 28, Biden held a fundraiser for his presidential campaign at Radio City Music Hall, accompanied by former Presidents Barack Obama and Bill Clinton, as well as other celebrities. Biden and the former presidents were repeatedly heckled during the event by pro-Palestine protesters, and a demonstration was held outside the venue to protest the Biden administration's policies in Gaza. According to Within Our Lifetime organizer Nerdeen Kiswani, about 1,000 were in attendance. In April 2024, Biden cancelled a planned Iftar due to pushback from invited Muslim American attendees. At the 2024 White House Correspondents' Dinner, protesters shouted "Shame on you!" at arriving attendees.

=== Pro-Palestinian protests on university campuses ===
Universities in the United States with Gaza War protests since April 2024. Columbia University is marked in red. Other colleges that had encampments are marked in green, and non-encampment protests are marked in blue.

By May 6, 2024, student protests had occurred in 45 of the 50 states in the United States and the District of Columbia, with encampments, occupations, walkouts or sit-ins on almost 140 campuses. Thirty-four encampments were established in the United Kingdom; across universities in Australia, beginning with the University of Sydney; and in Canada, including an encampment at McGill University. On May 7, protests spread further on European campuses after mass arrests at the University of Amsterdam campus occupation, including occupation of campus buildings at Leipzig University in Germany, Sciences Po in France, and Ghent University in Belgium. By May 8, protests had taken place in more than 25 countries, and on May 13, approximately 1,000 Dutch students and university staff took part in a national walk-out.

=== Queer pro-Palestinian Protests ===
During Pride parades throughout 2024, pro-Palestinian protesters counter-protested against celebration. Many often disrupted parades, leading to significant controversy.

== Midwest ==
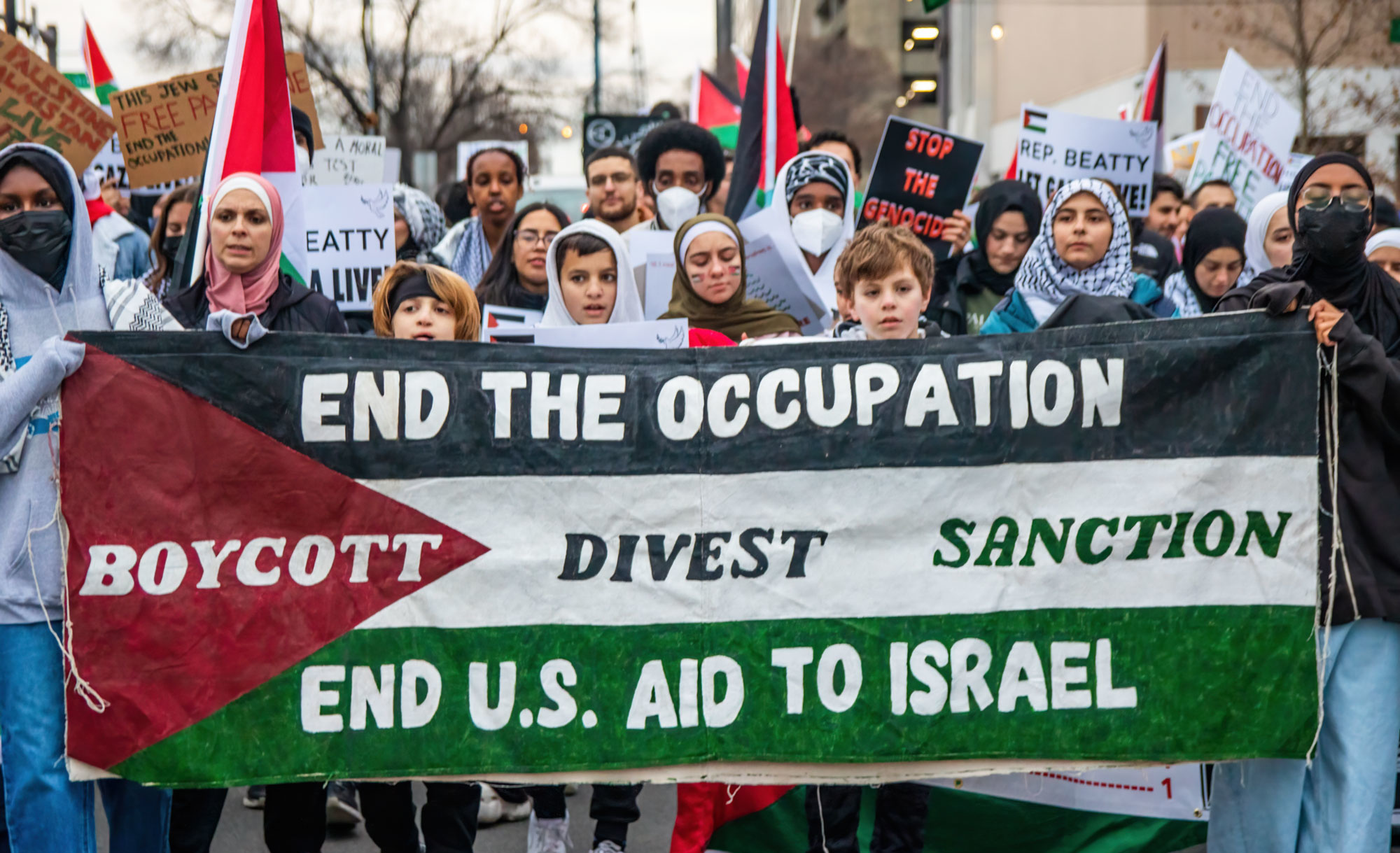
Pro-Palestine protest in Columbus, Ohio, December 22, 2023

=== Illinois ===
An October 14 protest in Chicago called for the freeing of hostages taken by Hamas, peace for Israelis and Palestinians, and an end to all killings of civilians. On October 24, two men were arrested after one shot into the air and another pepper-sprayed pro-Palestinian demonstrators at an Israel solidarity event near Chicago. On Black Friday, about 1,000 protesters marched on the Magnificent Mile retail district to condemn violence in Gaza. Police shut down streets and snowplows were used to corral the protesters. On the day before Christmas Eve, a large car caravan organized by a pro-Palestinian group blocked the I-90 near O'Hare International Airport. On New Year's Eve, hundreds of pro-Palestinian marched in Chicago, blocking the I-90 again, as well as the I-94. On January 5, 2024, protesters at Chicago Union Station demonstrated for a ceasefire.

On August 19, thousands protested near the United Center on the first day of the 2024 Democratic National Convention. Some tore down security fences while more chanted "End the occupation now!" and "The whole world is watching!" as a nod to anti-Vietnam War protesters at the 1968 Democratic National Convention in 1968.

=== Indiana ===
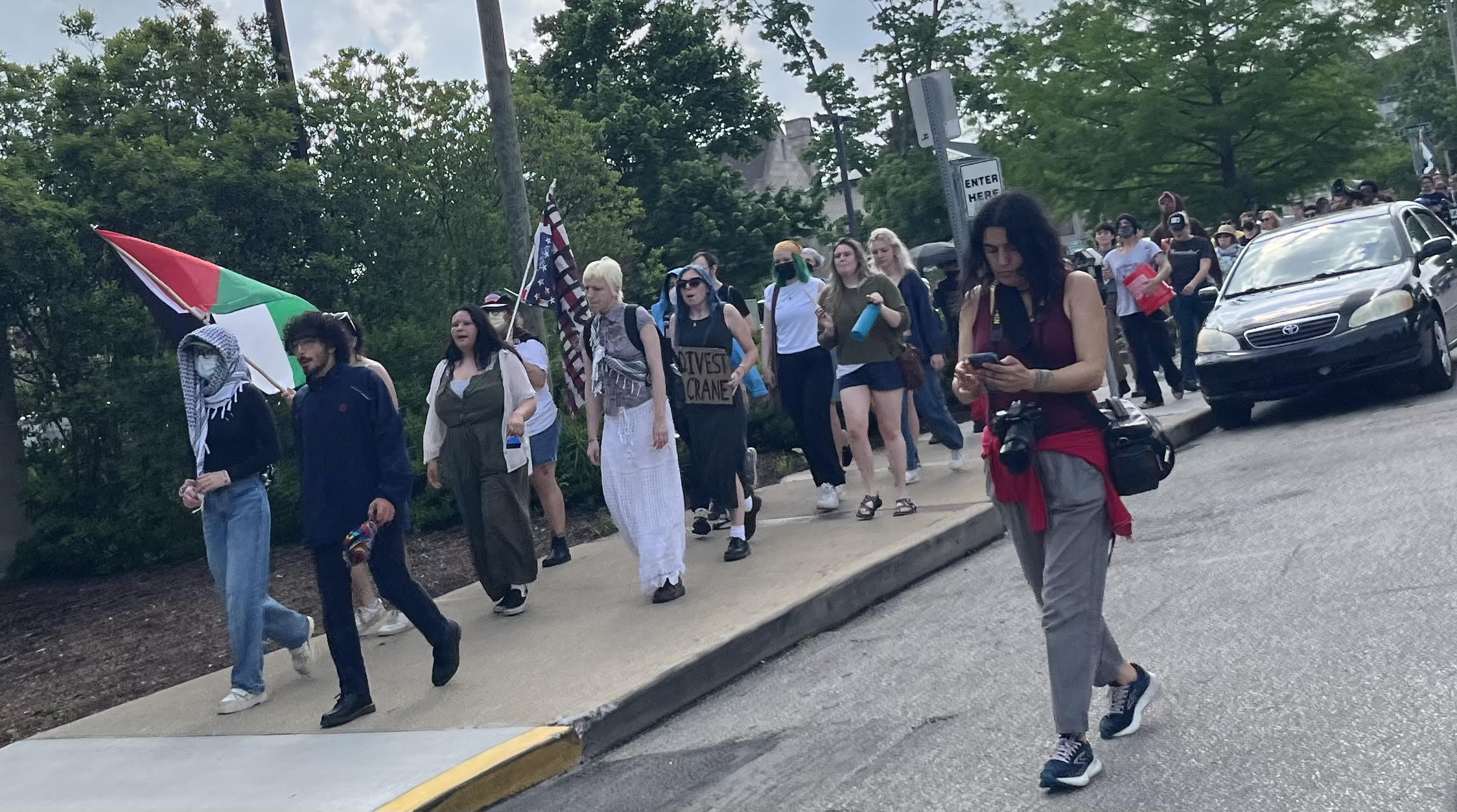
Pro-Palestinian protesters in Bloomington on May 7, 2024

Pro-Israel and pro-Palestinian protests and demonstrations occurred on each side of the Soldiers' and Sailors' Monument in Indianapolis on October 12, 2023. A pro-Palestinian protest took place on January 8, 2024, also at the Soldiers' and Sailors' Monument, where nearly 30 people attended before increasing to about 60 people, after moving to protest outside United States senator Todd Young's residence.

On April 25, a pro-Palestine protest occurred outside the residence of state governor Eric Holcomb, which resulted in the arrests of fourteen people. Additionally, protesters obstructed Meridian Street in Indianapolis on the same day, which led to the Indianapolis Metropolitan Police Department threatening arrests on them.

In September 2024, two people were charged with blocking the driveway of a Raytheon facility in Fort Wayne, giving letters to employees urging them to find a different use for their products. Charges were dropped in December.

=== Iowa ===
A pro-Palestine rally was held in Cowles Commons in downtown Des Moines on October 10 with approximately 80 people attending.

On October 25, hundreds of Grinnell College students walked out demanding that the college stop any financial support of Israel. On November 4, more than 100 University of Iowa students and community members from across Iowa gathered to rally for Palestine, calling for justice, peace and freedom from the oppression of Israel. On December 17, nearly 150 protesters gathered in two separate demonstrations in front of Terrace Hill, the official residence of the governor of Iowa, Kim Reynolds, as she was hosting a Christmas party. One demonstration was pro-Palestine, titled "No Justice No Christmas", while the other was in support of Iowa's Area Education Agencies (AEAs), with 40 people attending. Other protesters spoke out against recent anti-LGBTQ+ legislation in the state and a local drag artist performed.

=== Kansas ===
On November 14, 500 flags memorializing 10,000 Palestinians who died from October 7 to November 14 were placed on the lawn of Watson Library at the University of Kansas. The event was organized by the Muslim Student Association and Al-Hadaf KC. The Muslim Student Association and Middle Eastern Student Association organized a student walk-out for Palestine on November 20 with the goal of the chancellor of the university, Douglas Girod, releasing a statement in solidarity with Palestinian people. On November 30, pro-Palestine activists organized a sit-in at Strong Hall on the University of Kansas campus and hung banners inside and outside of the building. Protesters called again for a statement from the chancellor and criticized the university's involvement in the Defense Advanced Research Projects Agency and U.S.-Israel Binational Science Foundation. Over 100 activists marched down Massachusetts Street on March 2, 2024, calling for "hands off Rafah", for more humanitarian aid, and to vote uncommitted in the 2024 Democratic Party presidential primary.

On the first day of Chanukah, December 7, around two dozen activists from Jewish Voice for Peace sat in Sharice Davids' Overland Park, Kansas, office calling for a ceasefire and for more humanitarian aid to Gaza. Protesters carried signs saying, "Chanukah for ceasefire" and "Stop funding genocide".

=== Michigan ===
A group of pro-ceasefire activists gathered at the Gerald R. Ford Federal Building in Grand Rapids, Michigan, on November 7, resulting in three arrests for people who refused to leave the office of Representative Hillary Scholten. In Detroit, a Thanksgiving Day parade was interrupted by about 200 pro-Palestine protesters. On February 1, 2024, a group of Arab Americans protested against the arrival of Joe Biden for a campaign stop in Dearborn.

On the 2024 Quds Day (April 5), a pro-Palestine rally was organised in Dearborn (a city considered the capital of Arab Americans), where some protesters chanted "Death to America" and "Death to Israel". The Al Quds Committee Detroit, who organised the rally, posted on Facebook that the chants were "wrongful" and "a mistake", but that they will also continue to criticise the foreign policy of the United States.

Mayor Abdullah Hammoud spoke at a Dearborn rally on September 24, 2024, immediately following activist Osama Siblani. The two embraced as Hammoud joined Siblani on the stage. Siblani called to "return [Israelis] to Poland" and praised Hezbollah leader Hassan Nasrallah. Hammoud did not address the praise for the Hezbollah leader or the crowd's calls of "death to Israel", and did not respond to the media's request for comment.

=== Minnesota ===
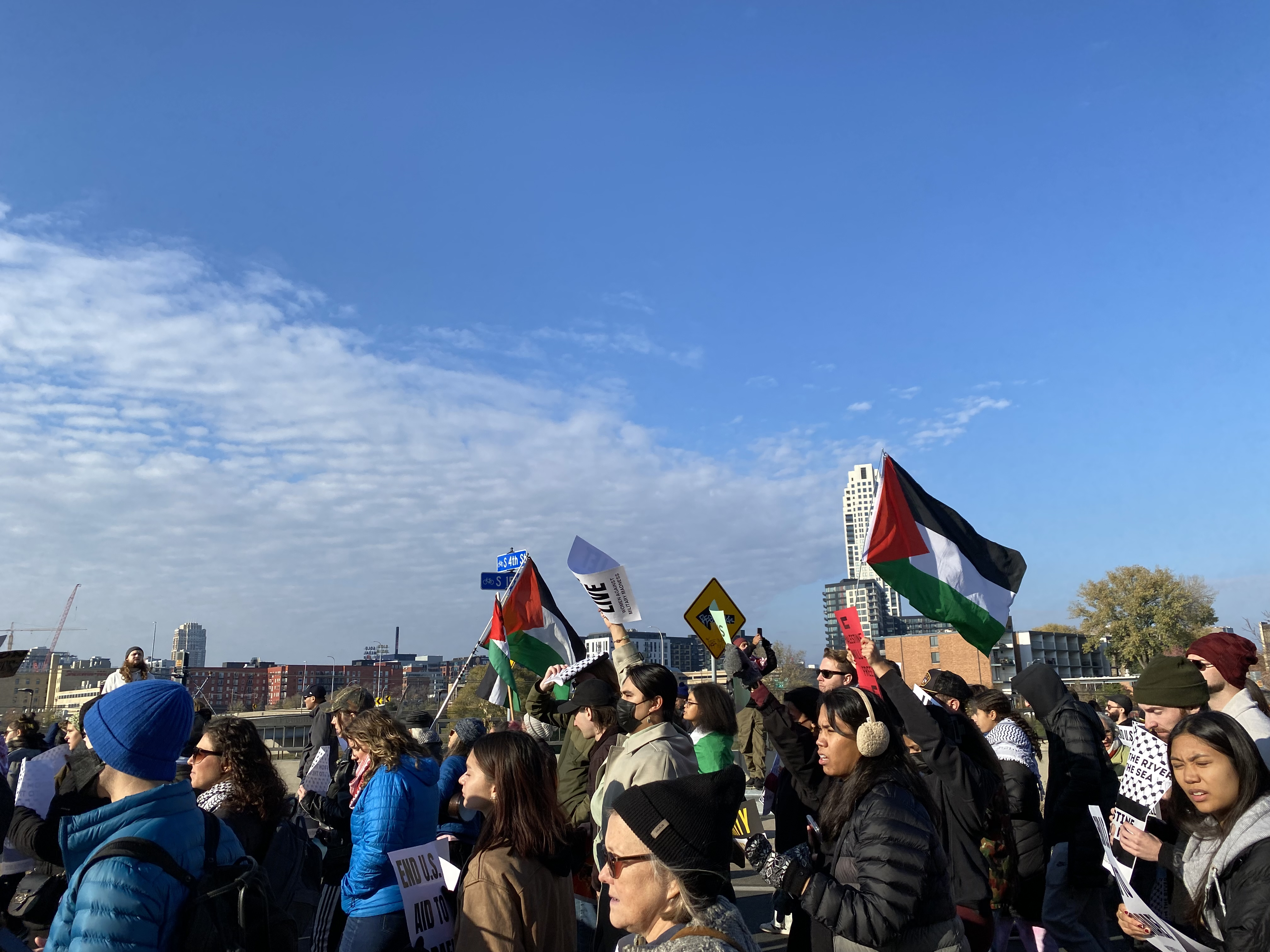
Pro-Palestinian protesters in Minneapolis on November 4, 2023

On October 10, a pro-Israel solidarity gathering took place at the Beth el Synagogue in St. Louis Park. U.S. Senator Amy Klobuchar spoke: "They are trying to destroy Israel. We will not let that happen." On October 18, a large crowd gathered outside the Minnesota State Capitol to support Palestinians in St. Paul. On October 22, in Minneapolis, a pro-Palestinian rally took place on the Irene Hixon Whitney Bridge. A car drove through the crowd in the afternoon and a confrontation occurred. A man was arrested in Minneapolis after driving through a crowd of anti-war activists. On November 1, a protester interrupted a speech by Joe Biden in Minneapolis asking him to call for a ceasefire, leading him to respond that a humanitarian "pause" was needed. On November 11, hundreds of activists marched Cathedral Hill to the state capitol demanding a cease-fire.

Seventy pro-ceasefire protesters demonstrated outside of Democratic presidential candidate and congressman Dean Phillips' office in Minnetonka on December 6. Hundreds protested for a ceasefire outside Amy Klobuchar's office on January 8.

On June 1, Twin Ports DSA held a rally outside Duluth City Hall. Speakers represented Palestinian, Indigenous, Muslim and Jewish viewpoints. They demanded a ceasefire in Gaza, repeal of the Minnesota Anti-Boycott, and Sanction Law and end of all aid to Israel. The group then marched to the Duluth Entertainment Convention Center where the Minnesota Democratic-Farmer-Labor Party (DFL) was endorsing candidates and selecting delegates for the upcoming Democratic National Convention.

=== Missouri ===
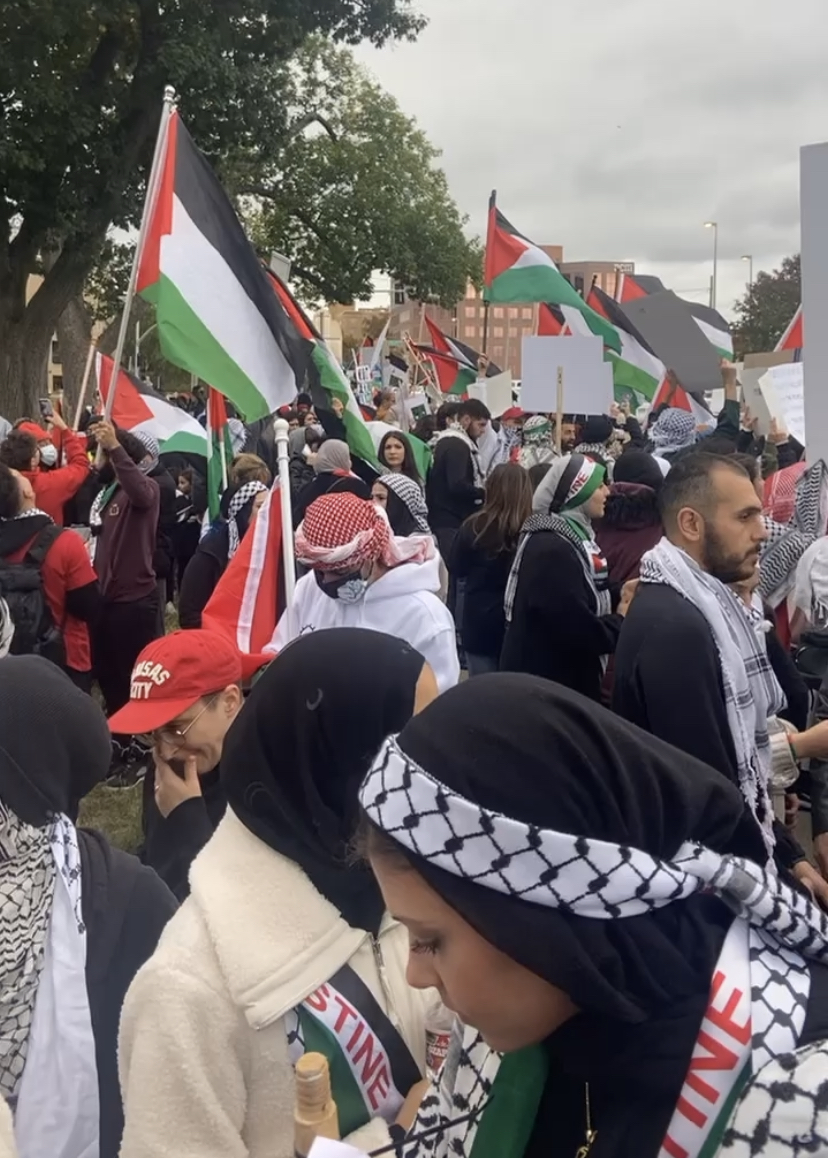
Pro-Palestine activists rally by the road at Mill Creek Park in Kansas City, Missouri, October 14, 2023

On November 6, more than 75 activists blocked the entrances to the Boeing plant in the St. Louis suburb of St. Charles, where the company manufactures bombs that have been sold to the Israeli government. About 150 activists participated in a second protest, blocking entrances again on November 21. Pro-Palestine students at Washington University in St. Louis (Washu) staged a die-in to pressure the university to cut ties with Boeing. Student activists from University of Missouri-St. Louis, Washu, and St. Louis University called for their universities to divest and disaffiliate with Boeing over the company's weapons manufacturing in a letter endorsed by seven student groups.

About 600 Kansas City residents attended a pro-Israel rally on October 9. On October 15, hundreds of people gathered for a pro-Palestine protest at Mill Creek Park. On November 8, 30 activists associated with Al-Hadaf KC and KC Tenants held a sit-in outside Representative Emanuel Cleaver II's office calling for his support for the Ceasefire Now Resolution. On November 18, Cleaver called for a ceasefire, but did not sign onto the resolution. In February 2024, the Girl Scouts threatened to sue a Missouri chapter for making bracelets for starving children in Gaza, leading the chapter to leave the national organization.

=== Ohio ===
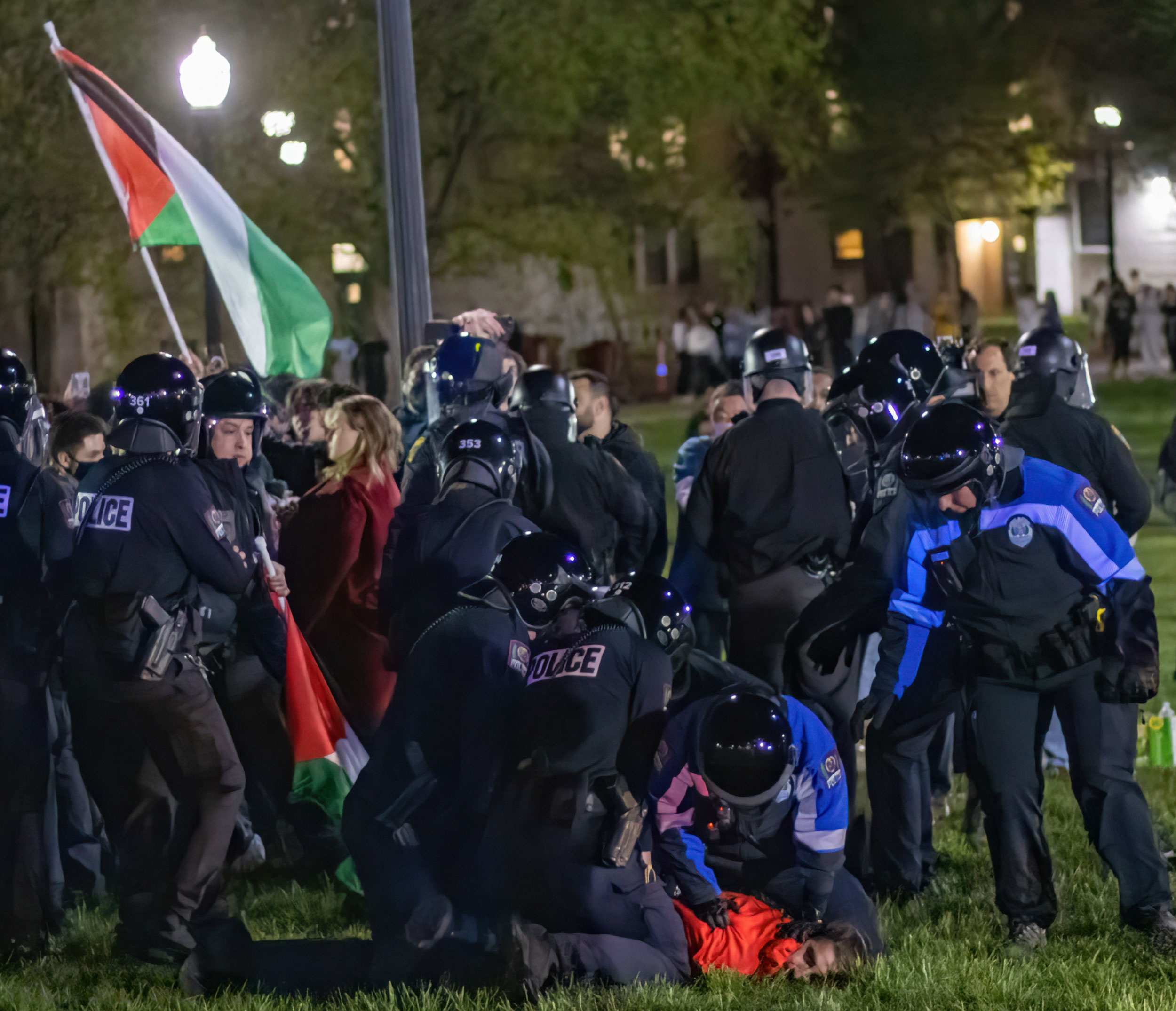
Officers arresting a pro-Palestinian protester at the OSU Gaza Solidarity Encampment, April 25, 2024

A series of protests at Ohio State University by pro-Palestinian demonstrators are ongoing and began on-campus following the outbreak of the Gaza war and genocide. A solidarity encampment was constructed on OSU's South Oval on April 25, 2024 in solidarity with the Columbia University encampment. Riot police then made 36 arrests against student protesters — the largest mass arrests in campus history since the 1969–1970 Vietnam War protests.

The protester demands of OSU include "financial divestment, academic boycott, financial disclosure, acknowledging the genocide, and ending targeted policing".

Pro-Palestinian groups have been critical of the university's responses to the protests, which have included allowing state troopers to aim sniper rifles at students during the dispersal of the Gaza Solidarity Encampment, suspending a pro-Palestinian student organization, and blocking the Undergraduate Student Government's attempts at passing legislation for financial divestment from Israel after receiving pressure from officials in Zionist organization Hillel International.

Following protests, the OSU administration coordinated multi-agency police operations, implemented a campus-wide chalking ban, and expelled pro-Palestinian social media influencer Guy Christensen; state-level officials floated invoking a 1953 anti-KKK statute against pro-Palestinian protesters who wore face coverings, suggested terminating faculty members who encourage or engage in "violence on campus", and passed the "CAMPUS" Act to formalize free speech restrictions; and officials in the Trump administration revoked the student visa of at least one pro-Palestinian protester at OSU and threatened to withdraw funding from OSU if they did not sufficiently "combat antisemitism" on campus. These actions have been met with multiple lawsuits over alleged violations of First and Fourteenth Amendment rights.

The university has insisted their actions are politically neutral, with OSU President Ted Carter stating the "university's long-standing space rules are content neutral and are enforced uniformly". Critics argue the university engages in selective enforcement of university space rules, enforcing policies disproportionately against pro-Palestinian groups and not similarly against other groups on campus.

== Northeast ==
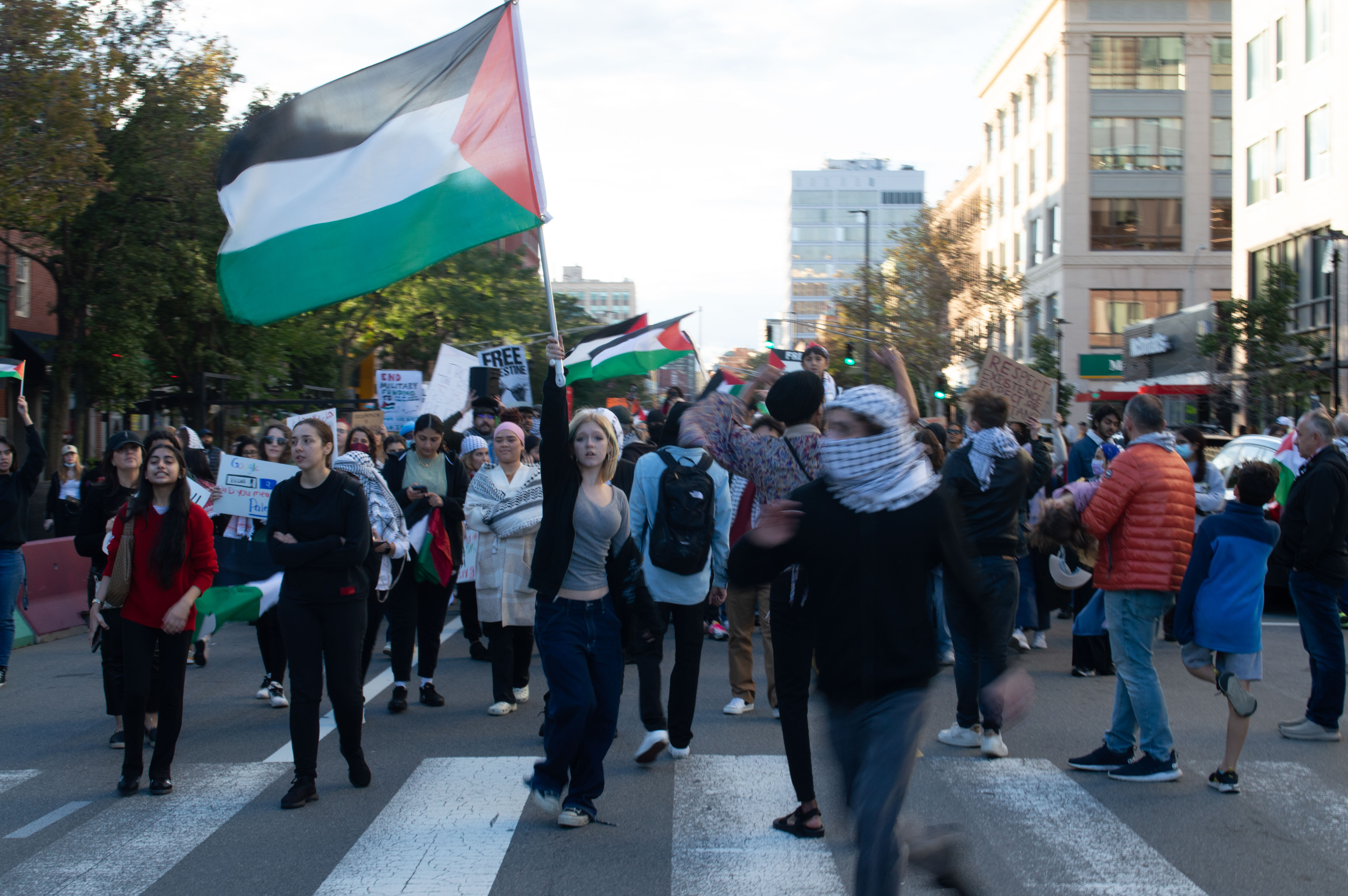
Students protesting against the war in Cambridge, Massachusetts, October 19, 2023

In Merrimack, New Hampshire, three protesters were arrested and charged with riot, sabotage, criminal mischief, criminal trespass, and disorderly conduct for a pro-Palestine protest that occurred at the offices of Elbit Systems, an Israeli "defense and homeland security business".

On November 11, pro-Palestinian protesters gathered near Biden's residence in Wilmington, Delaware, calling for a ceasefire and accusing him of genocide. On January 23, 2024, protesters outside a campaign event for Biden in Manassas, Virginia, chanted "Hey Hey, Ho Ho, Genocide Joe". The Council on American-Islamic Relations called for a federal probe into violations of international law due to a real estate event planned at a synagogue in Teaneck, New Jersey, which would sell "stolen land" taken from Palestinians in the Israeli-occupied West Bank.

On December 3, pro-Palestine demonstrators protested outside of Goldie, a falafel restaurant in Philadelphia, Pennsylvania. The Jewish shop owner was donating profits from the restaurant to Israel's Friends of United Hatzalah, an emergency medical fund established in the wake of the October 7 attacks. Dozens of demonstrators were arrested protesting against the Pennsylvania Treasury Department's investment in Israel bonds at the Pennsylvania State Capitol.

=== Connecticut ===
A protest was held at the University of Connecticut's main campus in Storrs by the UConn SJP chapter. On April 19, 2024, a pro-Palestinian protest occurred on the campus of Yale University in New Haven. Several days later, police arrested 45 protesters on the Yale campus.

A pro-Palestinian protest was held outside the Connecticut State Capitol in Hartford on April 10, 2024. In Middletown, ten protesters were arrested for blocking the entrance to the Pratt & Whitney facility on April 15.

=== District of Columbia ===
==== Rallies ====
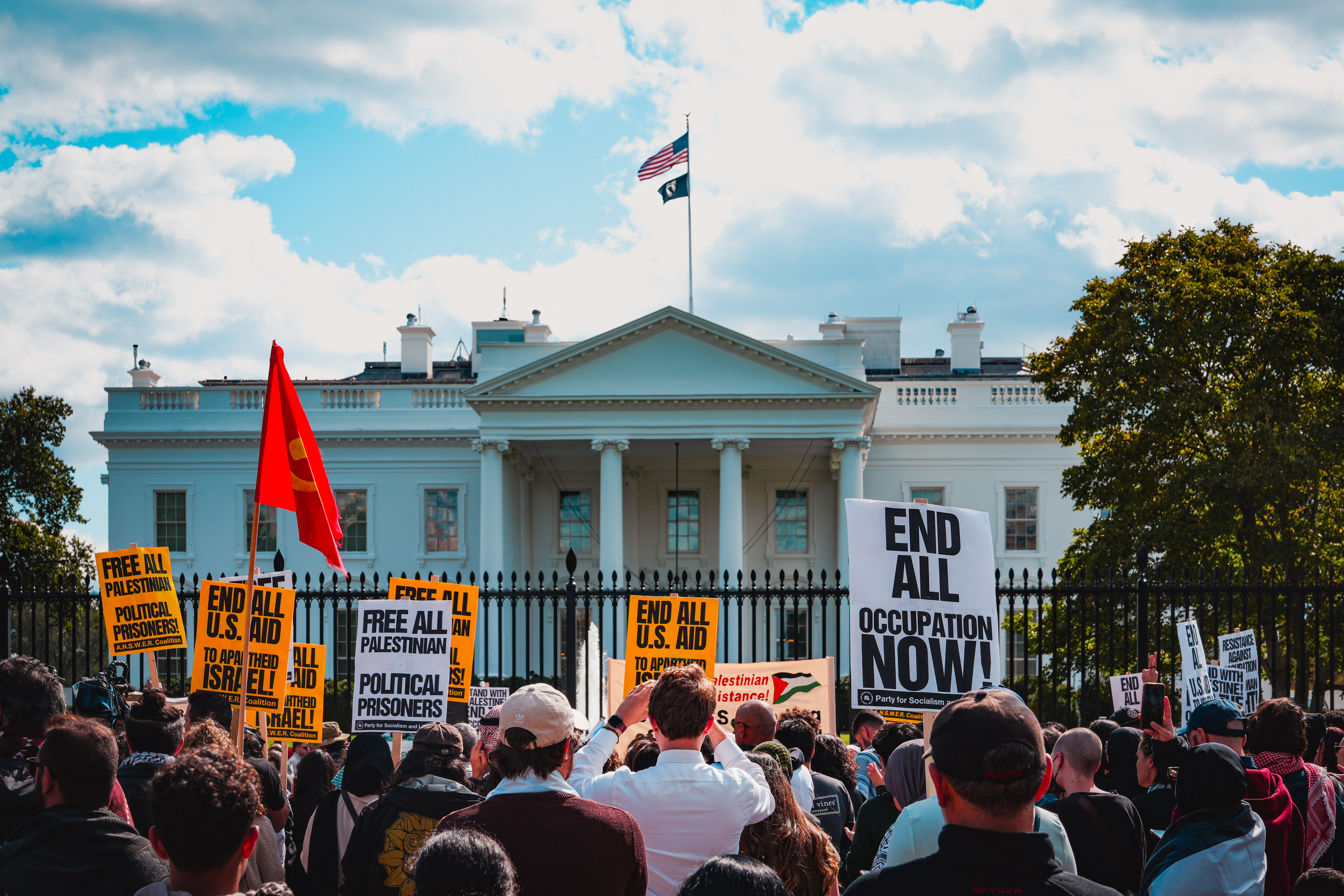
Protest against the war in Gaza at the White House, Washington, D.C., October 8, 2023

Jewish activists protested for a ceasefire on October 16 at the White House, saying Kaddish, singing Jewish songs, and chanting "Not in our name". 49 were arrested: 16 for blocking entrances and 33 for crossing safety barriers. On November 15, the headquarters of the Democratic National Committee was evacuated by the U.S. Capitol Police during a pro-Palestine rally, organized, in part, by IfNotNow, who reported that "police are being extremely violent" at the rally. Six officers were injured. On November 27, a group of more than a dozen state lawmakers and activists, including actress and former-gubernatorial candidate Cynthia Nixon, launched a hunger strike at the White House calling for a permanent ceasefire. On December 7, a group of doctors called for a ceasefire on Capitol Hill. On December 11, a group of twenty Jewish senior citizens were arrested after chaining themselves to the White House fence in protest of the war.

On November 4, 100,000 to 300,000 people participated in the "National March on Washington: Free Palestine", marking the largest pro-Palestine protest in US history. The march called for a ceasefire in Gaza, with many protesters condemning Israel's ongoing genocide in the Gaza Strip. It was organized by A.N.S.W.E.R., People's Forum, Students for Justice in Palestine, and other organizations. It saw support from over 450 organizations, including Democratic Socialists of America, Jewish Voice for Peace, IfNotNow, and the US Campaign for Palestinian Rights.

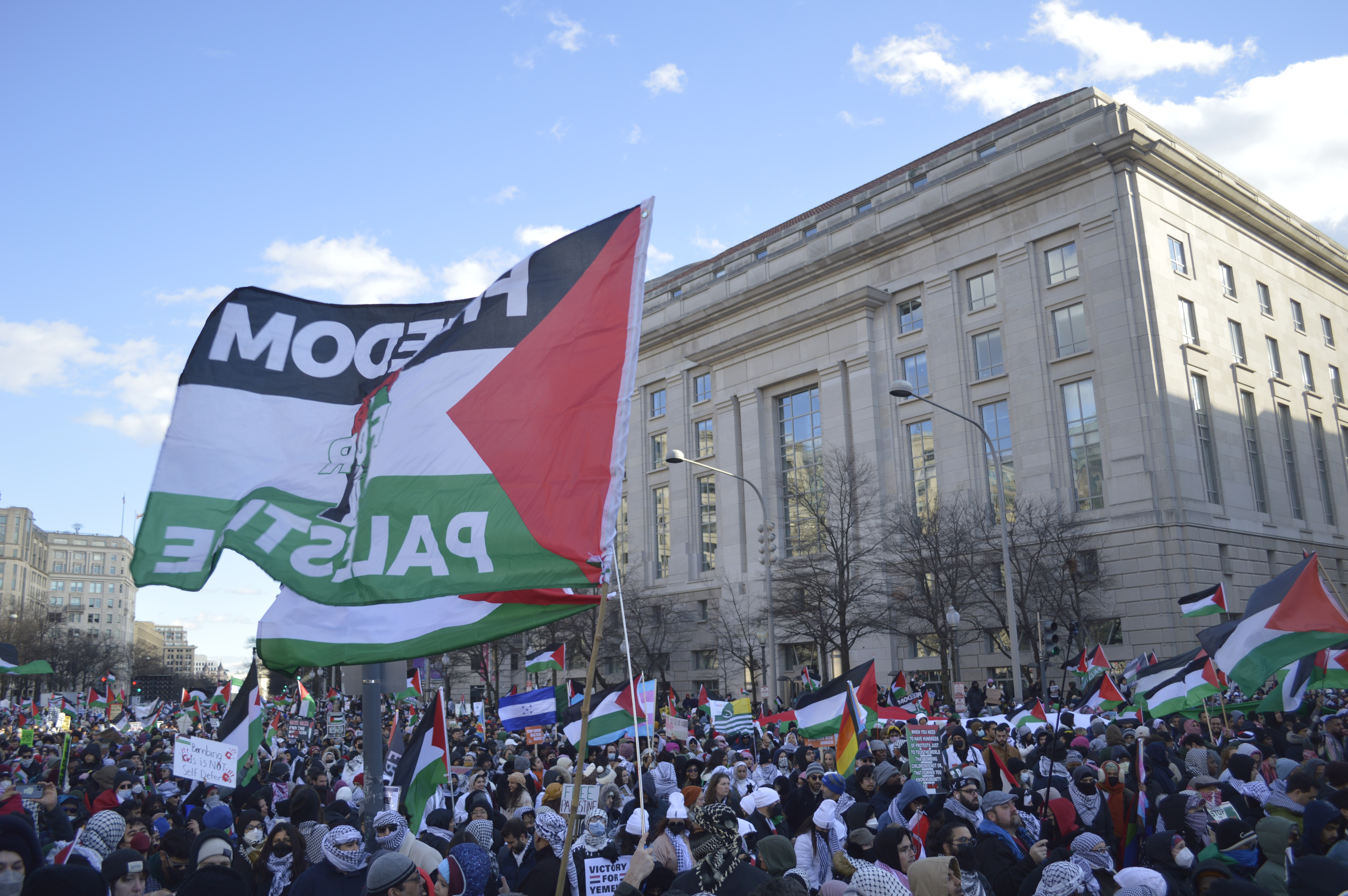
March on Washington for Gaza, January 2024

On November 14, 100,000 to 290,000 people participated in the "March for Israel" which called for the release of Israeli hostages and denouncing antisemitism. Israeli President Isaac Herzog spoke to the crowd through video feed, and the march lasted about two hours, according to organizers; the Jewish Federations of North America and the Conference of Presidents of Major American Jewish Organizations.

On January 13, 2024, thousands of Pro-Palestinian demonstrators gathered in Washington, D.C., to protest as part of a worldwide day of protests against the war.

On June 8, 2024, protesters held a "red-line" banner as thousands of people participated in a rally for ceasefire at the White House. The Biden administration slammed the "repugnant" rhetoric voiced at the rally, during which pro-Hamas and pro-Hezbollah demonstrators called for jihad and the killing of Zionists.

On October 5, 2024, more than a thousand protesters gathered in Black Lives Matter Plaza prior to the one year anniversary of October 7. During the protest, an attempted self-immolation took place when a journalist shouting about misinformation set their (Note: According to the cited WaPo source, this protester is said to go by they/them pronouns.) arm on fire.

==== Staffers ====
On November 8, more than 100 US congressional staffers staged a walk-out, demanding a ceasefire. A group of 40 White House interns sent a letter to President Biden saying they would "no longer remain silent" about the genocide occurring in Gaza. Josh Paul, a senior State Department official, resigned in protest of the US policy toward the war. On December 13, more than 100 staffers from the Department of Homeland Security stated the department leadership had "turned a blind eye to the bombing of refugee camps, hospitals, ambulances, and civilians". The same day, more than three dozen staffers in the Biden Administration held a rally outside the White House calling for a ceasefire. On January 14, ahead of reports that federal employees were planning a walkout in opposition to U.S. government policy in Israel, Speaker of the House Mike Johnson stated the House Oversight Committee would "ensure that each federal agency initiates appropriate disciplinary proceedings against any person who walks out on their job".

On May 15, Lily Greenberg Call, a special assistant to the Chief of Staff with the Interior Department became the first Jewish and fifth overall staffer to resign in protest of US support for Israel. Call alleged that Biden was using Jewish people to justify US involvement in the conflict.

==== Officials' homes ====
Protesters demonstrated outside Antony Blinken's home accusing him of participating in genocide. On December 12, hecklers interrupted a speech by vice-president Kamala Harris, demanding she call for a ceasefire. A protest was held at Lloyd Austin's home on December 25. Protesters again demonstrated outside Blinken's home, encouraging passing cars to honk their horns. In late-January 2024, protesters began camping outside of Blinken's house in protest of the war.

==== Government buildings ====
On October 18, about 300 protesters were arrested at a Jewish-led pro-ceasefire demonstration inside the Cannon House Office Building. On October 31, antiwar protesters interrupted a US Senate hearing where Secretary of State Antony Blinken and Defense Secretary Lloyd Austin requested billions of military aid for Israel. On November 3, a pro-Palestine group reported that 52 activists had been arrested for engaging in sit-ins in US Senate offices. On December 11, 51 protesters calling for a ceasefire in the Senate building were arrested. On December 19, protesters entered the US Capitol Building to protest against the war. On January 17, 150 members from Mennonites Action were arrested at a pro-ceasefire sit-in in the US Capitol. On January 14, 2024, protesters organized by Code Pink threw baby dolls covered in fake blood at the White House as part of the "National March 4 Gaza". In March 2024, protesters blocked Pennsylvania Avenue in protest of Biden's 2024 State of the Union Address, with one demonstrator stating, "No more genocide with our tax dollars". On July 23, a day before Benjamin Netanyahu was scheduled to address a joint session of Congress, the US Capitol Police announced that they had arrested about 200 protesters wearing red shirts that said "JEWS SAY STOP ARMING ISRAEL" in the Cannon House Office Building. Jewish Voice for Peace, who organized the sit-in, said that at least 400 were arrested. On March 4, 2026, former Marine Brian McGinnis interrupted a hearing in the Hart Senate Office Building with shouts of “America does not want to send its sons and daughters to war for Israel!” US senator Tim Sheehy (R-MT) attempted to assist Capitol Police in forcibly removing him, breaking his arm in the process.

==== Aaron Bushnell ====
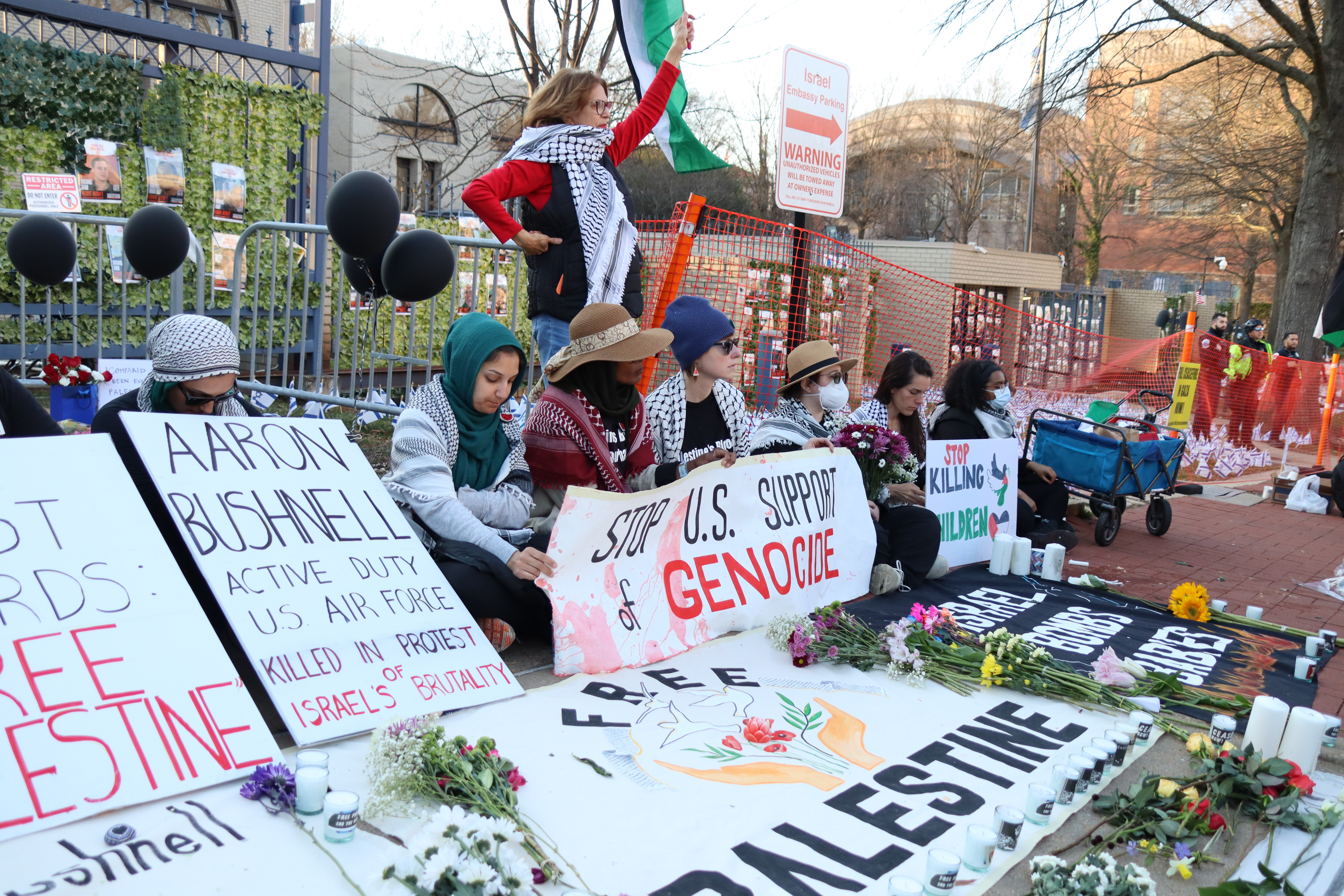
A vigil to Aaron Bushnell held outside of the Israeli embassy in Washington, D.C., February 2024

On February 25, 2024, Aaron Bushnell, an active-duty U.S. Air Force officer, self-immolated outside of the Israeli Embassy in Washington, D.C., protesting Israel's assault on Gaza during the war. Bushnell filmed the protest and livestreamed it on Twitch, and recorded as he walked up to the Israeli Embassy, saying "I am an active duty member of the United States Air Force, and I will no longer be complicit to genocide. I am about to engage in an extreme act of protest. But compared to what people have been experiencing in Palestine at their hands of their colonizers, it's not extreme at all. This is what our ruling class has decided will be normal." When Bushnell arrived at the embassy gates, he set his phone down to film himself dousing his body in a clear liquid from a metal bottle. He then lit himself on fire while shouting "Free Palestine". Multiple police officers responded to the scene and used fire extinguishers on Bushnell. He was transported by the DC Fire and EMS to a local hospital where he later died from his injuries. A vigil was held on February 27 in front of the Israeli Embassy to memorialize Bushnell.

=== Maine ===
On Black Friday 2023, the Maine Coalition for Palestine held a rally near a shopping mall in Freeport.

On July 27, 2024, at least nine protesters were arrested during a christening event for the new Arleigh Burke-class destroyer, USS Patrick Gallagher, for blocking the road outside the Bath Iron Works. Two were charged with obstructing a public way and the others were charged with criminal trespass. Police from Bath and Sagadahoc County arrested the group which had split off from a larger demonstration of about 75 people.

=== Massachusetts ===
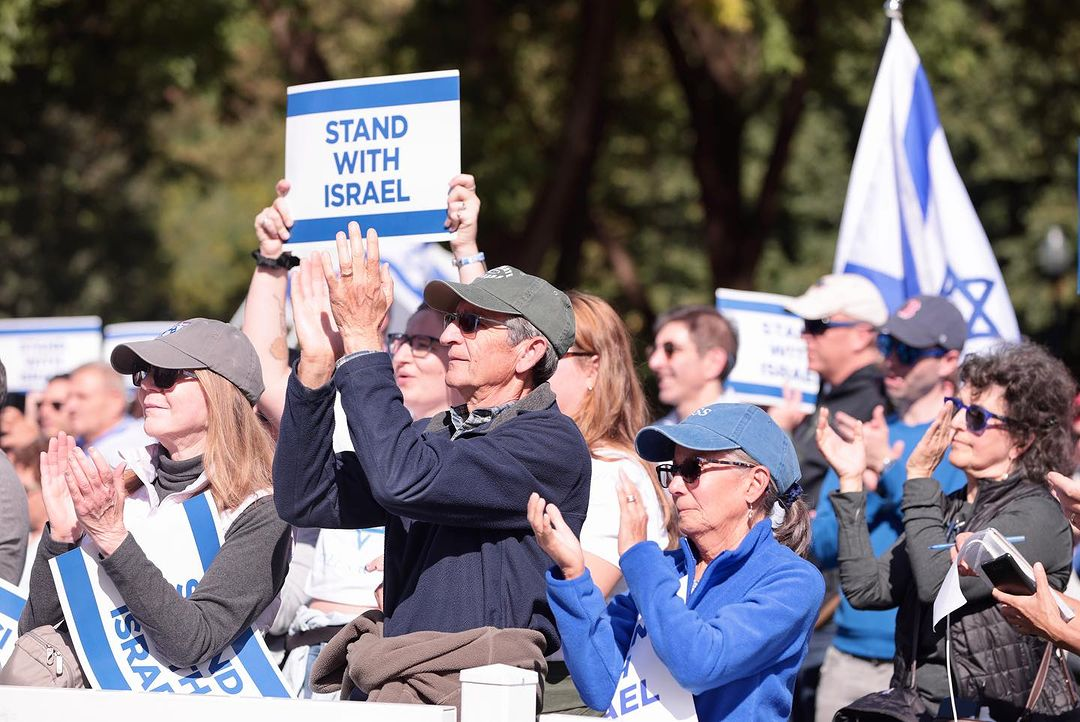
Pro-Israel rally in Boston, Massachusetts, October 9, 2023

The Students for Justice in Palestine organized a protest at Harvard University in October, several days after numerous students were doxed for publicly supporting Palestine. A pro-Palestinian die-in took place at Harvard College on October 18. A proctor in charge of overseeing freshmen was indefinitely relieved of his duties for participating. On November 9, Harvard Rabbi Hirschy Zarchi spoke at a demonstration to pay tribute to the hostages held by Hamas, saying that anyone who justified the October 7 attack was "not just an animal. You're below an animal. You're a monster". During a pro-ceasefire sit-in protest at the University of Massachusetts Amherst, 56 students and one university employee were arrested for trespassing. Students staged another die-in at the UMass Amherst on December 6. Anti-war student protesters at MIT were suspended for refusing to leave a campus building they were occupying.

On Black Friday, protesters in Somerville targeted a PUMA store because the company provides equipment to the Israeli National Sports Teams. On Thanksgiving, President Biden was heckled by pro-Palestine activists in Nantucket chanting "Free Palestine". On October 24, hundreds of pro-Palestinian protesters gathered in front of Worcester City Hall. On the same day, in Nantucket, protesters targeted a Christmas tree lighting attended by Biden and his wife. Hundreds of pro-Palestine protesters rallied outside of a fundraiser for the Biden 2024 reelection campaign on December 5 in Boston. The demonstration was organized by the Party for Socialism and Liberation.

=== New York ===
On November 9, 2023, 200 Cornell students staged a sit-in to symbolize the lives lost on both sides of the war. On December 1, 2023, students at Cornell protested outside the office of university president Martha Pollack, holding a mock trial where they charged her with genocide against Palestinian civilians. In March 2024, a group of 24 individuals, including two staff members, were arrested and charged with trespassing for staging a sit-in on the Cornell campus.

==== New York City ====
===== General protests =====
====== 2023 ======
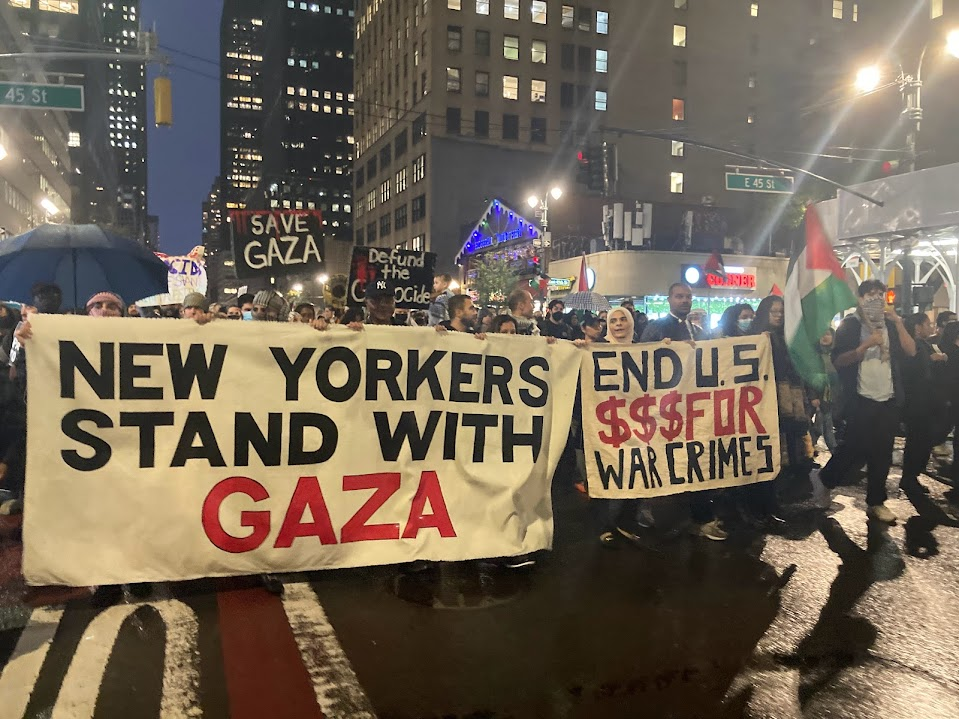
Pro-Palestine march in New York City, October 23, 2023

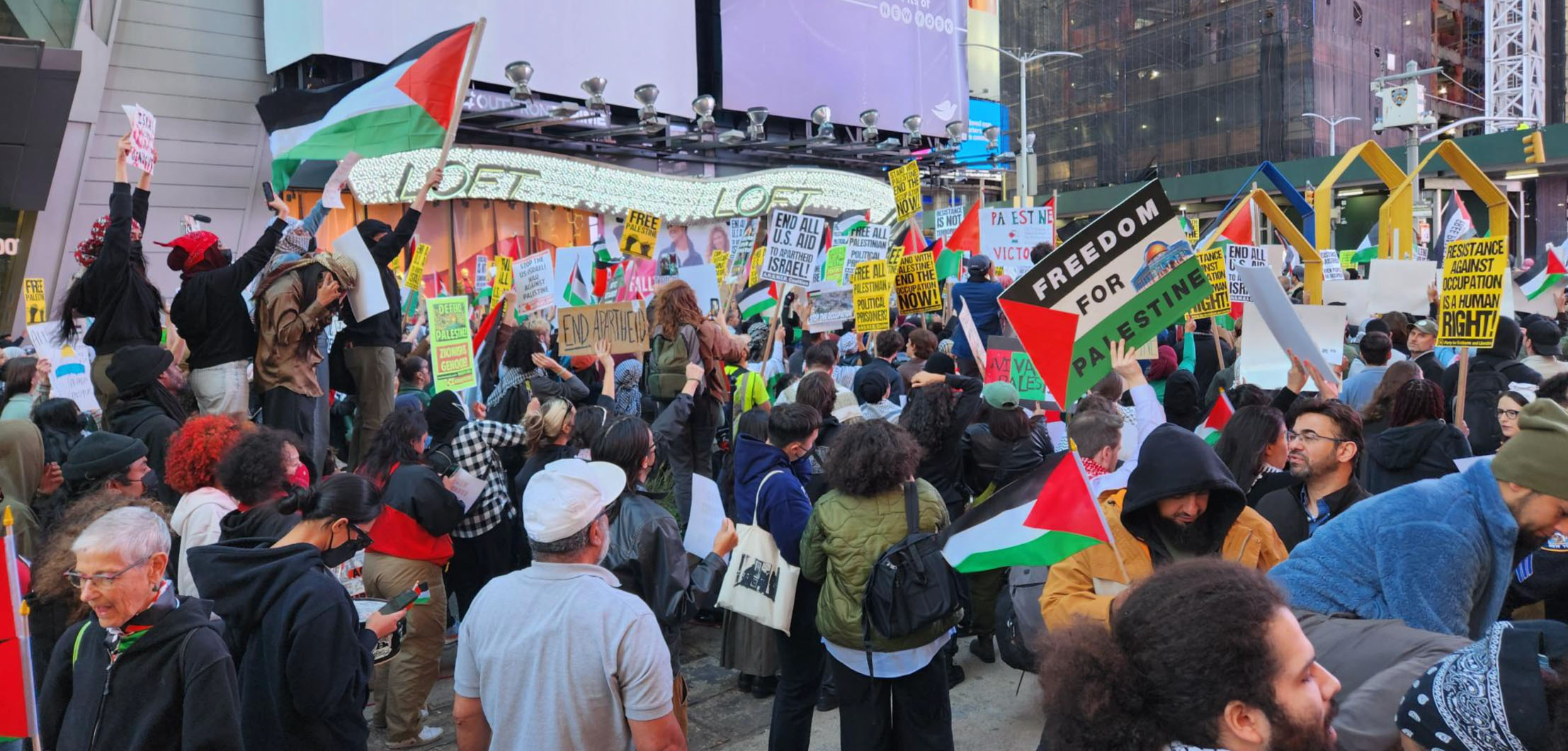
Stand with Palestine event, October 14, 2023

On October 8, 2023, one day after Hamas' attack on Israel, hundreds of pro-Palestinian demonstrators—over 1,000 according to Politico—participated in a rally in Times Square organized by socialist and Palestine liberation groups, including the Palestinian Youth Movement and Party for Socialism and Liberation. (Note: The New York City Democratic Socialists of America also endorsed the rally.) Demonstrators waved Palestinian flags and repeated chants including "free, free Palestine, long live Palestine", "Resistance is justified", "Globalize the Intifada", "From the river to the sea, Palestine will be free", "By any means necessary", "Glory to our martyrs", and "Smash the settler Zionist state". Dozens of pro-Israeli protesters also organized a counter-protest, singing Hatikvah and chanting "Never again" and "Am Yisrael Chai". Tensions were high between the 2 sides, with pro-Palestinian protesters chanting "700", referring to the confirmed number of Israeli fatalities in the attack at that moment, while the pro-Israeli protesters called them "terrorists" and "murderers".

On October 14, thousands demonstrated against the bombing in Gaza. A viral video from a pro-Israel protest showed several protesters explicitly calling for genocide against Palestinians. At Dag Hammarskjöld Plaza, about 200 rallied on October 18 to draw attention to hostages held by Hamas. Protesters included many family members of hostages and local Jewish leaders. On November 6, around 500 protesters staged a sit-in at the Statue of Liberty, calling for a ceasefire.

Protesters gathered in front of the New York Public Library on Thanksgiving Day. They clashed with police after being seen spray-painting graffiti on the building. Pro-ceasefire protesters from Jewish Voice for Peace shut down the Manhattan Bridge for hours on November 26. Protesters demonstrated at Rockefeller Plaza on December 25 to call for a ceasefire. Also on Christmas Day, pro-Palestinian protesters clashed with the NYPD and several were arrested. On December 28, a vigil for children killed in Gaza was held in Times Square. A "Flood the Bronx for Gaza" march was held in the Bronx. Protesters blocked several bridges entering Manhattan on January 8, as well as a tunnel-entrance for New Jersey-bound traffic.

====== 2024 ======
On October 14, 2024, about 500 protesters organized by Jewish Voice for Peace staged a sit-in outside the New York Stock Exchange as the market opened Monday morning. Multiple arrests were made.

====== 2025 ======
On April 24, 2025, clashes between pro-Palestinian and pro-Israeli demonstrators erupted outside the Chabad-Lubavitch headquarters in Crown Heights, Brooklyn, in response to a visit by Israeli national security minister Itamar Ben-Gvir.

====== 2026 ======
Pro-Palestine protesters in Times Square in front of a state sponsored pro-Israel ad on the day of Netanyahu's speech at the UN General Assembly, September 24, 2026

Protesters march through Manhattan on the day of Netanyahu's speech, September 24, 2026

In May 2026, pro-Palestinian protesters gathered outside Park East Synagogue in Manhattan during the “Great Israeli Real Estate Event”, a property exhibition marketing homes in Israel and Israeli settlements in the West Bank. They waved Palestinian flags and chanted “There is only one solution, intifada revolution”. They also chanted “Death to the IDF” and “It is right to resist, Israel should not exist”. The demonstration was described by organizers as opposing the sale of property in Israeli settlements, while some Jewish organizations and commentators criticized some of the slogans.

===== Elected officials =====
A group of Jewish Voice for Peace protesters, including children of Holocaust survivors, were arrested outside Senator Chuck Schumer's home for protesting against the bombings in Gaza. At Brooklyn College, Republican New York City Council member Inna Vernikov of the 48th City Council District was arrested for bringing a gun to a counterprotest at a pro-Palestine rally.

On October 24, a protest organized by the Bronx Anti-War Coalition took place outside of Rep. Ritchie Torres' office in Fordham, Bronx. Nearby, more than 500 pro-Israel protesters, including a large number of students at SAR Academy, organized at nearby Seton Park to support the Congressman's position.

On December 15, protesters gathered outside Chuck Schumer's office, chanting, "Schumer! Schumer! You can't hide. You're supporting genocide." On February 7, 2024, Jewish protesters attempted to block Biden's presidential motorcade from attending a fundraiser with donors. On February 15, protesters interrupted Tom Suozzi's victory speech, chanting, "You can't hide! You're supporting genocide!"

===== University protests =====
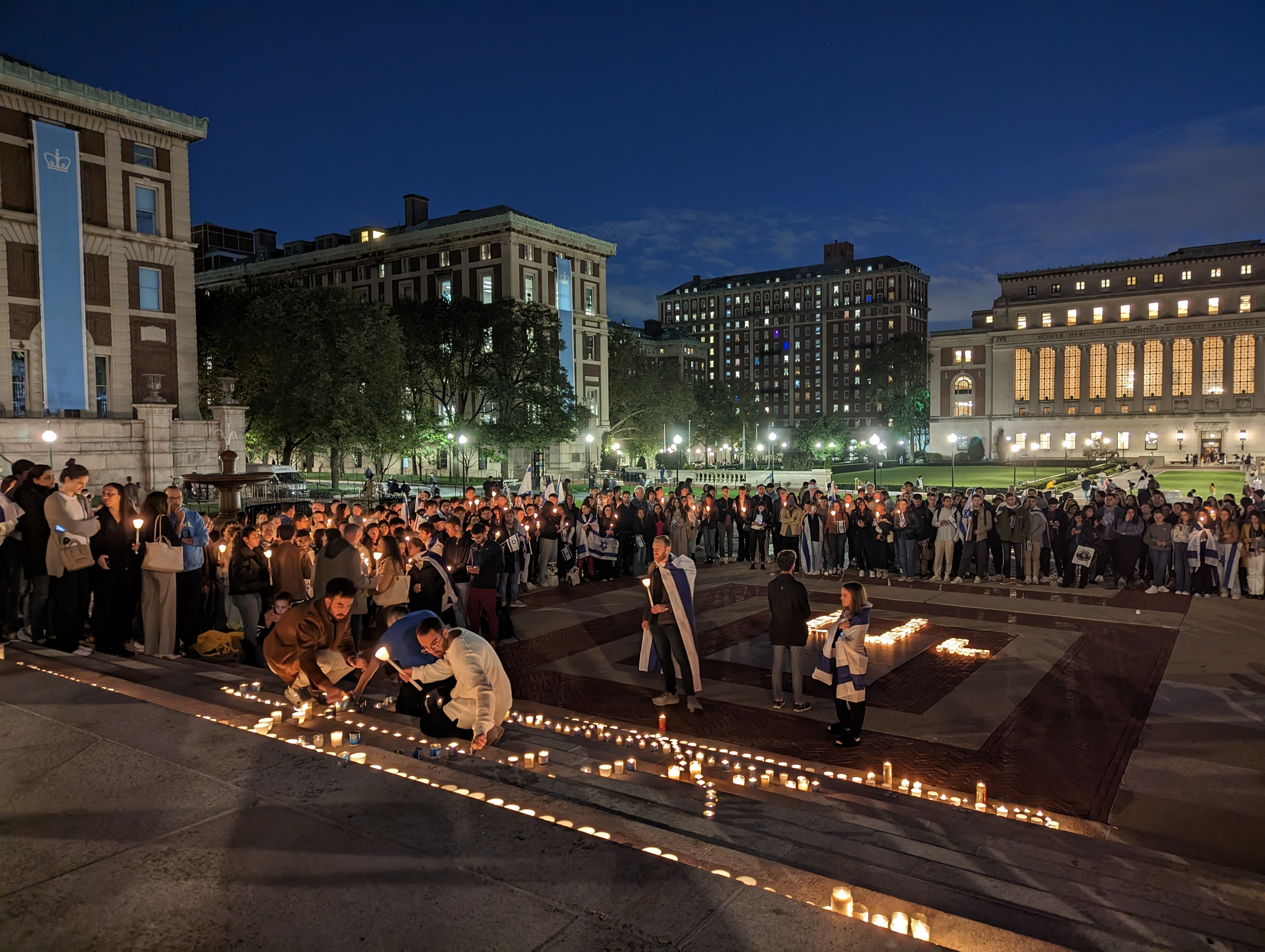
Vigil for Israel at Columbia University, October 9, 2023

On October 26, a group of anti-war students protested at Cooper Union. A group of Jewish students claimed they'd barricaded themselves in the library to hide from the "aggressive" protesters, but the New York City Police Department said that there had been "no danger" to the Jewish students. The account told by the Jewish students was repeated by elected officials and media accounts, including condemnations from the Anti-Defamation League, the American Jewish Committee, New York Governor Kathy Hochul, and Manhattan Borough President Mark Levine.

Anti-war student protesters at Columbia University reported experiencing targeted harassment. Students walked out of a class taught by Hillary Clinton in support of Palestine after her comments against a ceasefire. Pro-Palestine protesters heckled Clinton on November 29 at Columbia University's International Affairs Building and accused her of supporting genocide.

In January 2024, students at a pro-Palestine demonstration at Columbia University were attacked with Skunk. One victim, who said that Palestinian friends recognized the odor as Skunk, described it as having the smell of "poop mixed with decaying animal". Victims of the attack reported difficulty removing the odor from their clothes and other possessions, and that the effects of the spray including its odor, skin irritation, nausea, and dizziness continued days after the attack despite efforts to remove it. In response, demonstrators organized a protest outside the university. The incident was being investigated by the New York City Police Department as a potential hate crime. Students for Justice in Palestine and Jewish Voice for Peace published a report in which they stated the perpetrators were former IDF soldiers and current Columbia students.

At a pro-Palestinian rally held by students of Columbia University, protesters chanted "there is only one solution, intifada revolution", "Yemen, Yemen make us proud, turn another ship around" (a pro-Houthi slogan) and "NYPD, KKK, IDF, they're all the same".

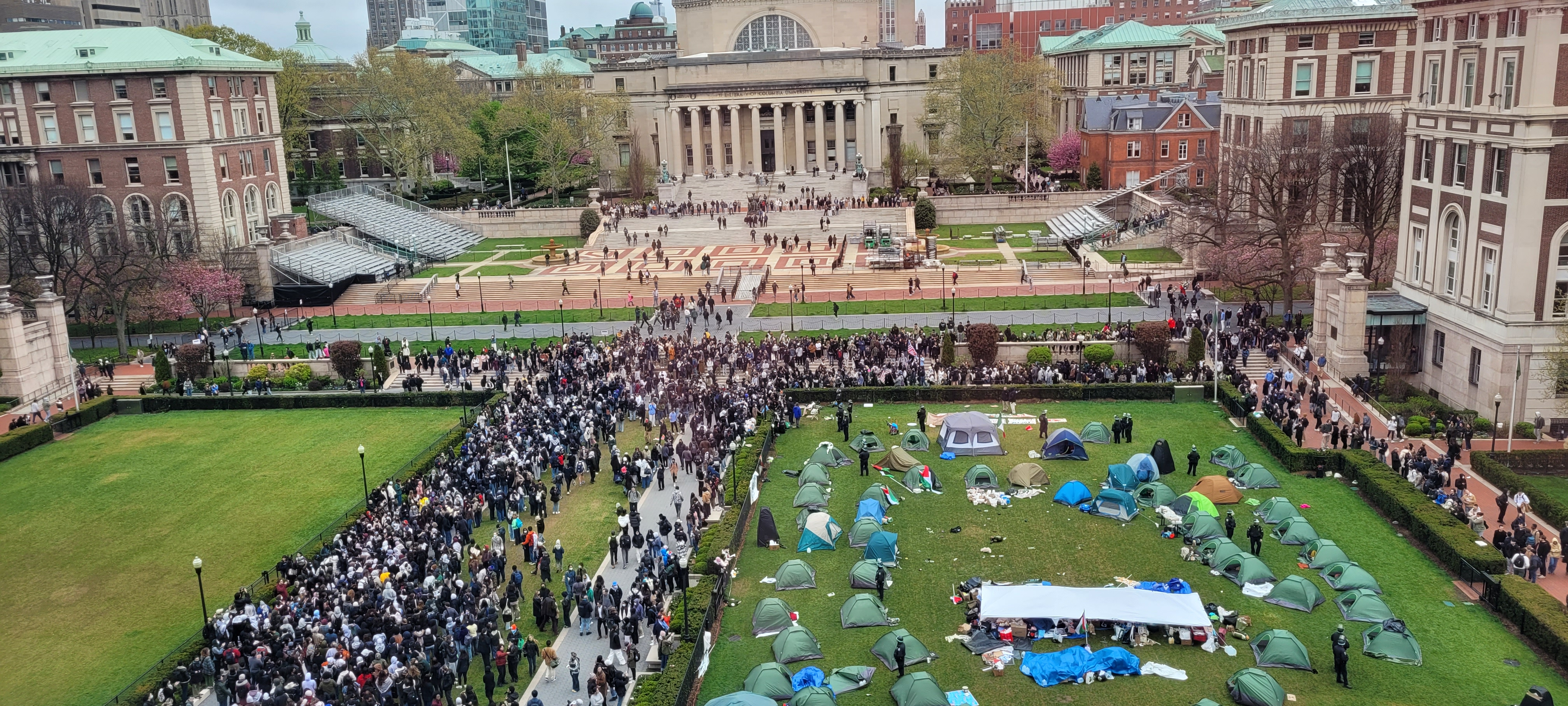
NYPD cleaning the "Gaza Solidarity Encampment", April 18, 2024

On April 17, the campus occupation by student protestors at Columbia began, with protestors establishing the "Gaza Solidarity Encampment", which was dismantled by the NYPD but later set up again on another part of campus.

Protests later spread to several other campuses, including Yale and NYU.

On April 26, a Columbia student who had emerged as a leader of the protest movement was barred after declaring in a video that "Zionists don't deserve to live". Other protests groups condemned the comments, but the New York Times said they raised the question of "How much of the movement in support of the Palestinian people in Gaza is tainted by antisemitism?" The Columbia encampment and many other encampments at American university campuses were ultimately cleared by police.

===== Institution protests =====
On November 10, protesters staged a sit-in at The New York Times, saying the newspaper was complicit in "laundering genocide". The CEO of the Legal Aid Society said a resolution by New York City public defenders to condemn the killing of Palestinian civilians was antisemitic. On December 7, Doctors Without Borders held a vigil outside United Nations headquarters in honor of the medical workers killed in Gaza. Thousands of members of US labor unions gathered on December 22 in support of a ceasefire. Rabbis for Ceasefire prayed for a ceasefire at the UN on January 9. Protesters demonstrated outside of Memorial Sloan Kettering Cancer Center for its collaborations with Israeli medical centers. On February 11, protesters at the Museum of Modern Art and Brooklyn Museum called on the institutions to cut ties with donors who had ties to Israel. Protesters demonstrated against AIPAC at the lobby's New York office on February 23. On March 14, protesters blocked The New York Times' distribution center. In April, ads on MTA subways were replaced with pro-Palestinian messages.

===== Event protests =====
On November 23, 2023, pro-Palestinian protesters disrupted the Thanksgiving Day Parade. Wearing white jumpsuits covered with fake blood, some glued themselves to the parade route along Sixth Avenue near 45th street. Protesters were reported at two other locations. Pro-Palestine demonstrators held a vigil and a rally outside the Rockefeller Center during the annual lighting of the Rockefeller Center Christmas tree. Police clashed with protesters at Sixth Street and seven people were arrested. On March 28, pro-Palestinian protests occurred outside a Biden fundraiser at Radio City Music Hall.

=== New Jersey ===
On October 22, 2023, an "emergency rally for Gaza" was held in Paterson. On October 28, a Princeton University staff member assaulted a pro-Palestinian protester at an off-campus event calling for ceasefire in Gaza.

On February 12, protesters organized by "American Muslims for Palestine" interrupted an event inside Drumthwacket, the Governor's Mansion in Trenton where Gov. Phil Murphy was hosting a celebration of the lunar new year. The group demanded that the New Jersey-Israeli State Commission be disbanded.

On October 17, 2025, protestors with Jewish Voice for Peace occupied the lobby of a high rise where an office of Cory Booker is located, in protest of his votes in favor of military aid for Israel and against funding for UNRWA.

=== Pennsylvania ===
On October 9, 2023, a pro-Israel demonstration was held outside the Kaiserman Jewish Community Center in Wynnewood.

On February 24, pro-Israel and pro-Palestine demonstrations were held simultaneously in Lower Merion. The two groups largely avoided one another, though they briefly exchanged chants.

In late April 2024, pro-Palestinian students set up protest encampments on the grounds of Swarthmore and Haverford College.

==== Philadelphia ====
In the immediate aftermath of the October 7 attacks, most of Philadelphia's major Jewish institutions made statements in support of Israel, including the Jewish Federation of Greater Philadelphia, Congregation Rodeph Shalom, and the Weitzman National Museum of American Jewish History.

Most pro-Palestinian demonstrations in Philadelphia were organized or supported by the Philly Palestine Coalition. The Coalition held its first pro-Palestinian rally since the start of the war on October 8.

On October 12, pro-Palestinian demonstrators rallied outside WHYY's Old City studio in protest of local media's coverage of the Israeli-Palestinian Conflict.

Large pro-Palestinian demonstrations were held on the Benjamin Franklin Parkway and at the Philadelphia Museum of Art on October 21 and in Center City on October 28.

Multiple pro-Palestinian protests in late October were held outside the office of Senator John Fetterman.

On November 2, around 25 pro-Palestinian protestors were arrested after blocking the entrances to several Amtrak gates during a larger demonstration at 30th Street Station.

On November 9, pro-Palestinian protestors held a die-in at City Hall. Another demonstration was held outside City Hall on November 17. Another was held on November 24.

On December 3, pro-Palestinian protestors held a citywide demonstration with several stops, including Goldie, an Israeli restaurant owned by Michael Solomonov. Chants directed at the restaurant by protestors were condemned by politicians, including the Biden administration, Governor Josh Shapiro, Senator John Fetterman, Representative Brendan Boyle, State Representative Ben Waxman, and State Senator Nikil Saval. In their statements, politicians said that the restaurant was targeted for being Jewish-owned. The Philly Palestine Coalition denied this accusation, citing Solomonov's financial support for the Friends of United Hatzalah, an emergency services organization partnered with the Israel Defense Forces, Solomonov's Israeli government-appointed role as a "culinary ambassador", and allegations by former Goldie employees that they were fired for expressing pro-Palestinian beliefs.

On December 10, a pro-Israel rally was held at Congregation Rodeph Shalom.

On December 14, pro-Palestinian protestors were arrested after blocking I-76 and the Spring Garden Street Bridge.

On February 13, a large pro-Palestinian demonstration marched through Center City.

On March 2, a pro-Palestinian protest, which began at City Hall, blocked the Benjamin Franklin Bridge for about 40 minutes. On March 3, a pro-Israel rally was held in Rittenhouse Square.

On March 9, a pro-Palestinian demonstration marched from Rittenhouse Square to the Spring Garden Street offices of Day & Zimmermann, a defense contractor manufacturing weapons used in the Israeli invasion of Gaza.

On March 30, a protest was held in Center City with hundreds in attendance. 67 people were arrested for disorderly conduct after blocking I-676.

On April 15, pro-Palestinian protestors engaged in a series of Tax Day actions intended to "block the flow of capital" and protest US taxpayer funding for Israel. Protestors slowed traffic and staged a car caravan funeral procession on I-95. They also blocked several highway ramps at Broad and Vine Streets and protested at City Hall, the IRS offices at 30th and Market Streets, and the Day & Zimmermann headquarters at 15th and Spring Garden Streets.

On April 25, after a march from Center City to West Philadelphia, which passed through the campuses of Temple University and Drexel University, pro-Palestinian protestors set up an encampment on the campus of the University of Pennsylvania. In the following days, the encampment grew in defiance of orders from the university administration to disband. Protestors vowed not to comply with ID checks by Penn police. A letter circulated by Penn Faculty for Justice in Palestine in support of the encampment collected more than 1,200 signatures.

Six people were arrested during a pro-Palestinian 4th of July demonstration at City Hall, after protestors burned flags and scuffled with police.

Several hundred protestors gathered at City Hall on the night of the 2024 presidential debate to protest the pro-Israel positions of both Donald Trump and Kamala Harris. Marching down Market Street, the protest made it to 4th Street before being hemmed in by riot police. Organizers told marchers to disperse, but a smaller number stayed behind and clashed with police.

=== Rhode Island ===
On November 9, 20 Jewish students were arrested at Brown University for occupying University Hall and demanding a ceasefire and divestment resolution. Charges against the Jewish students were dropped after a Palestinian-American Brown University student was shot and wounded in Burlington, Vermont. At a vigil for the injured student, protesters chanted “Shame! Shame! Shame!” at president Christina Paxson, leading her to leave the podium. On December 6, 41 protesters at Brown were charged with trespassing at University Hall for another sit-in protest to raise awareness about the same shooting in Burlington over Thanksgiving Break. On December 19, the university announced they would not be dropping the charges against the 41. In February 2024, students at Brown announced they would be going on a hunger strike to protest their university's complicity in the war.

=== Vermont ===
In Burlington, Vermont, large rallies were held in support of Israel and Palestine in October 2023. The Vermont chapter of the Party for Socialism and Liberation and Vermonters for Justice in Palestine held a pro-Palestinian rally. Governor Phil Scott, mayor Miro Weinberger and city council president Karen Paul attended a pro-Israel rally on Church Street organized by a coalition of local Jewish leaders.

On November 9, protestors disrupted a fundraising event for Becca Balint, demanding that she call for a ceasefire.

In April 2024, students at the University of Vermont and Middlebury College established protest encampments, urging their universities to divest from Israel.

== South ==
=== Florida ===
At the University of Florida, Jewish students held a candlelight vigil. At the University of South Florida in Tampa Bay, at least 200 marched at an Emergency Rally for Gaza following an official letter from the Chancellor of the State University System of Florida directing all SUS Presidents to terminate all pro-Palestinian groups.

=== Georgia ===
In Atlanta, protesters gathered along the presidential motorcade route to Rosalynn Carter's funeral on November 28, calling on Biden to end all aid to Israel. A woman at the Israeli consulate in Atlanta self-immolated in protest of the war and was described to be in a "critical condition" on December 1.

In late April 2024, at a protest at Emory University in Atlanta, philosophy professor Noëlle McAfee and economics professor Caroline Fohlin were arrested by police, according to CNN; after Fohlin questioned the police's use of force against people she identified as students, she was taken down to the ground by police and handcuffed.

In June, 28 Pro-Palestinian protesters rallied in Atlanta where the first 2024 presidential debate was being held between Joe Biden and Donald Trump.

=== Kentucky ===
In Kentucky, the Students for Justice in Palestine organized a protest at the University of Louisville.

=== Louisiana ===
During Kendrick Lamar's halftime show at Super Bowl LIX, held in Caesars Superdome in New Orleans, one backup dancer stood on top of a Buick that was part of the performance and raised the flags of Palestine and Sudan. The protester was tackled by security and banned from all NFL events, though he was not charged with a crime.

=== North Carolina ===
Clashes between supporters of Israel and Palestine were reported at the University of North Carolina at Chapel Hill, in front of the Wilson Library on October 12. On Black Friday in Raleigh, North Carolina, people inside Crabtree Valley Mall made a false report to 911 that shots had been fired at a pro-Palestine protest. A large police response broke up the protest.

=== South Carolina ===
On January 8, 2024, Biden was heckled with chants of "ceasefire now" during a campaign speech at Emanuel African Methodist Episcopal Church in South Carolina. Biden responded, "And I've been quietly working, I've been quietly working with the Israeli government to get them to reduce and significantly get out of Gaza using all that I can to do that. I understand the passion."

=== Tennessee ===
On March 26, students at Vanderbilt University staged a sit-in at Chancellor Daniel Diermeier's office at Kirkland Hall after the school removed an amendment to prevent student government funds from funding Israel-supporting businesses. The amendment had garnered well over the required 600 student signatures. About 30 students partook in the protest and were forcibly removed the next day, 3 were arrested, including a reporter, and multiple faced suspensions and imminent evictions from student housing.

=== Texas ===
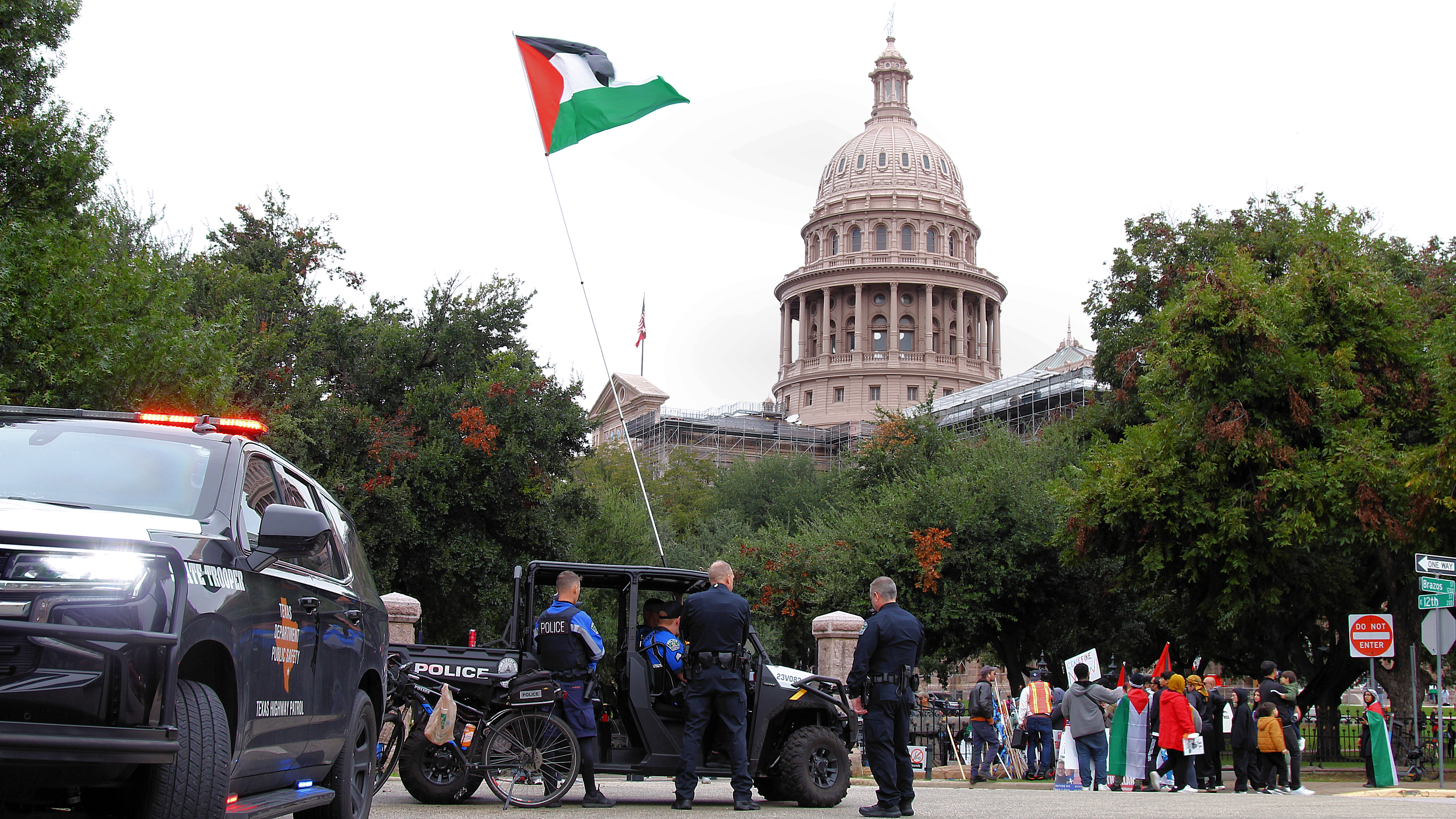
Rally in support of Palestine at the Texas State Capital in Austin, November 12, 2023

On November 12, thousands protested Texas's support of Israel in front of the State Capitol in Austin.

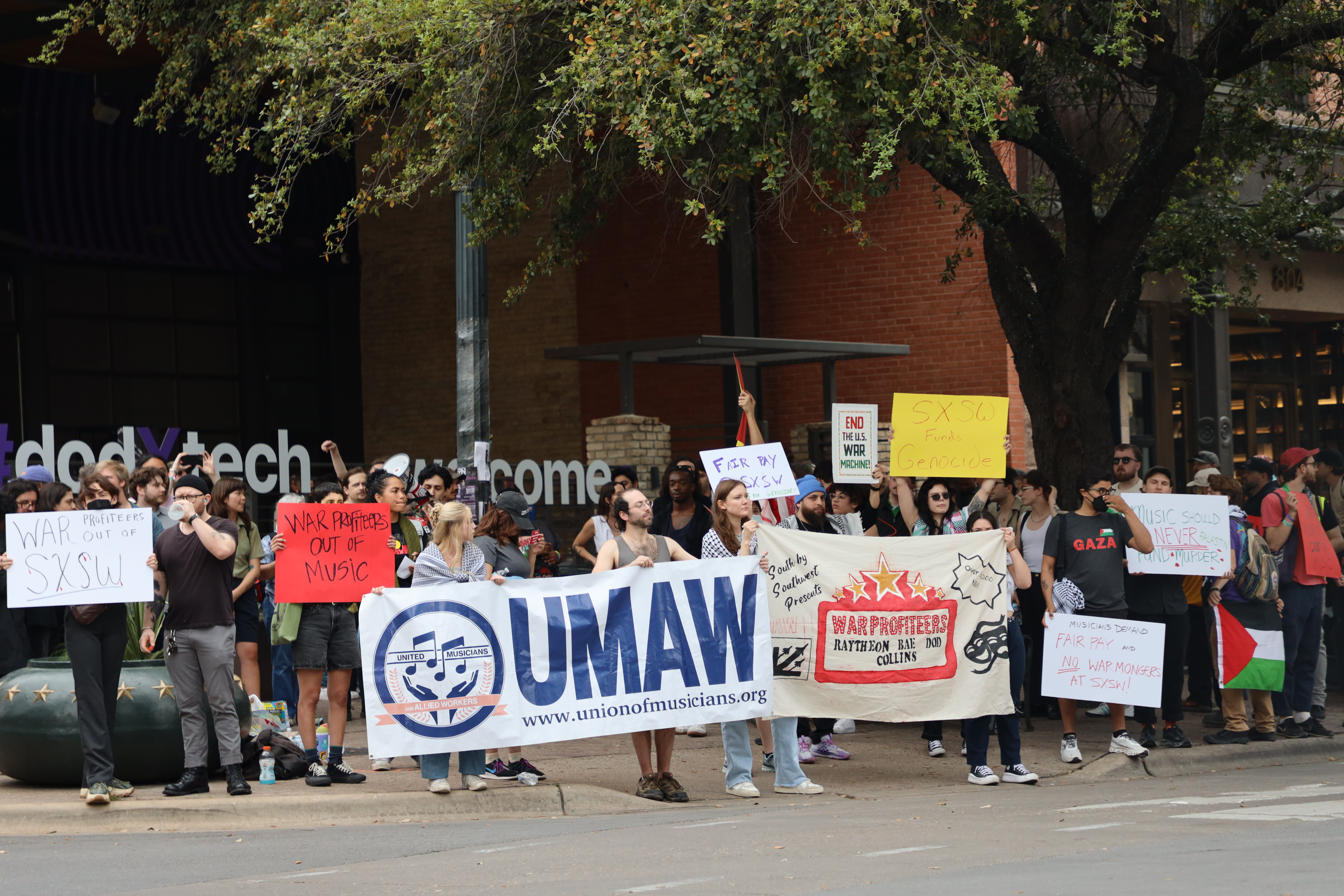
Protest against the SXSW festival in Austin, Texas, March 14, 2024

More than 80 musicians decided to boycott the 2024 SXSW music festival because of the event's partnership with the US military and major defense contractors. The festival terminated its partnership with the US Army and the defense contractor RTX Corporation for its 2025 festival.

On April 5, protesters gathered around Harris County Jail in Houston to demand the release of protesters arrested during a separate Al Quds Day demonstration.

== West ==
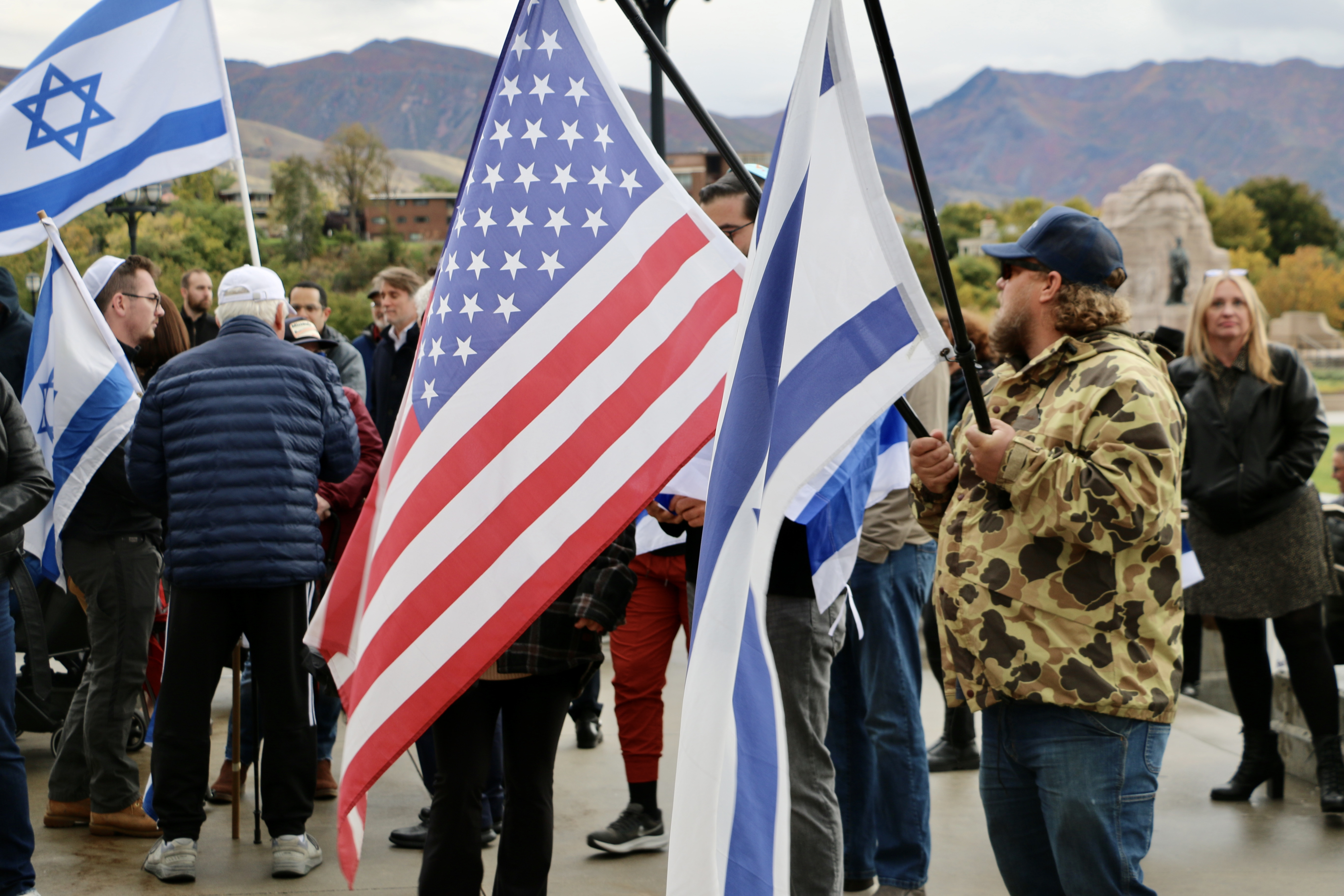
Pro-Israel protest in Salt Lake City, Utah, October 11, 2023

=== Alaska ===
On February 24, about 150 protesters calling for a ceasefire in Gaza, including indigenous elders and Juneau Assembly members Christine Woll and Paul Kelly, rallied at Marine Park in Juneau.

On May 6, the Anchorage Assembly passed a resolution (8–4) calling for "a lasting peace in the Israeli-Hamas conflict".

On May 18, about 100 protesters carrying signs calling for a ceasefire gathered for a rally outside of the Alaska State Capitol in Juneau. Governor Mike Dunleavy had recently proposed a bill that would criminalize unpermitted street protests.

=== Arizona ===
At the University of Arizona, a rally protesting against the bombing of Gaza was cancelled due to safety fears after university president Robert C. Robbins criticized its organizing group and urged them to conduct their protest "peacefully, safely, and civilly". In March 2024, a young woman was dragged out of an event by security after interrupting Jill Biden by stating, "Jill, when are you and the president going to call for a ceasefire in Gaza?"

=== California ===
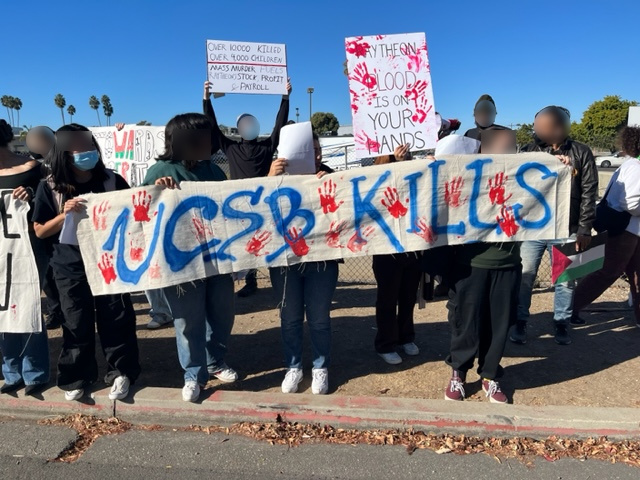
Protest outside Raytheon's office in Goleta, California, November 9, 2023

On November 18, 2023, the California Democratic Convention in Sacramento was cancelled after hundreds of pro-Palestinian protesters descended on the SAFE Credit Union Convention Center. On December 5, a Holiday tree-lighting ceremony at the California State Capitol was postponed due to a planned protest organized by the Sacramento Regional Coalition for Palestinian Rights. On January 3, 2024, hundreds of protesters from Jewish anti-war groups, including Sacramento City Councilwoman Katie Valenzuela, shut down the California State Assembly at the Capitol in Sacramento on the House's first working session of the new year. In June 2024, protesters hung a banner reading "Stop the Genocide" on El Capitan in Yosemite National Park.

==== Greater Los Angeles ====
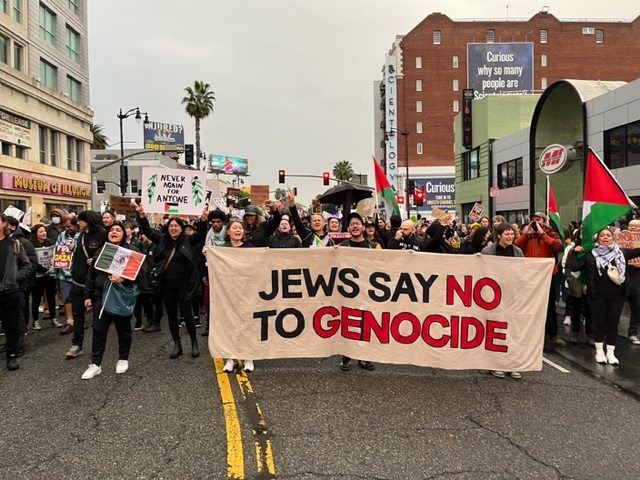
Pro-Palestinian protest in Los Angeles against the war in Gaza and Hollywood's role in dehumanizing Muslims, November 2023

On October 9, thousands of demonstrators expressed solidarity with Israel on Santa Monica Boulevard in Beverly Hills. A UCLA student demonstrating support for Palestine was reportedly threatened with a knife. On October 14, thousands protested against the bombings in Gaza in Downtown Los Angeles. On October 21, thousands of demonstrators protested Israeli airstrikes, denouncing Netanyahu as a "war criminal". On October 29, a pro-Israeli rally was held on Santa Monica Beach. On November 4, hundreds of demonstrators marched to the Israeli Consulate in West Los Angeles, calling for an immediate ceasefire. In Thousand Oaks, a 69-year-old Jewish man named Paul Kessler died after sustaining head injuries following an altercation during dueling protests on November 4. On November 16, suspect Loay Alnaji was arrested on charges of involuntary manslaughter and battery with a preliminary hearing set for December 4.

Protesters splashed red paint on the Raytheon headquarters entrance sign in El Segundo. On Black Friday, hundreds gathered at Pan Pacific Park in the Fairfax District to attend a protest organized by A.N.S.W.E.R. to demand a ceasefire in Gaza. On December 7, the UCLA chapter of Jewish Voice for Peace held a "Chanukah for Peace" event.

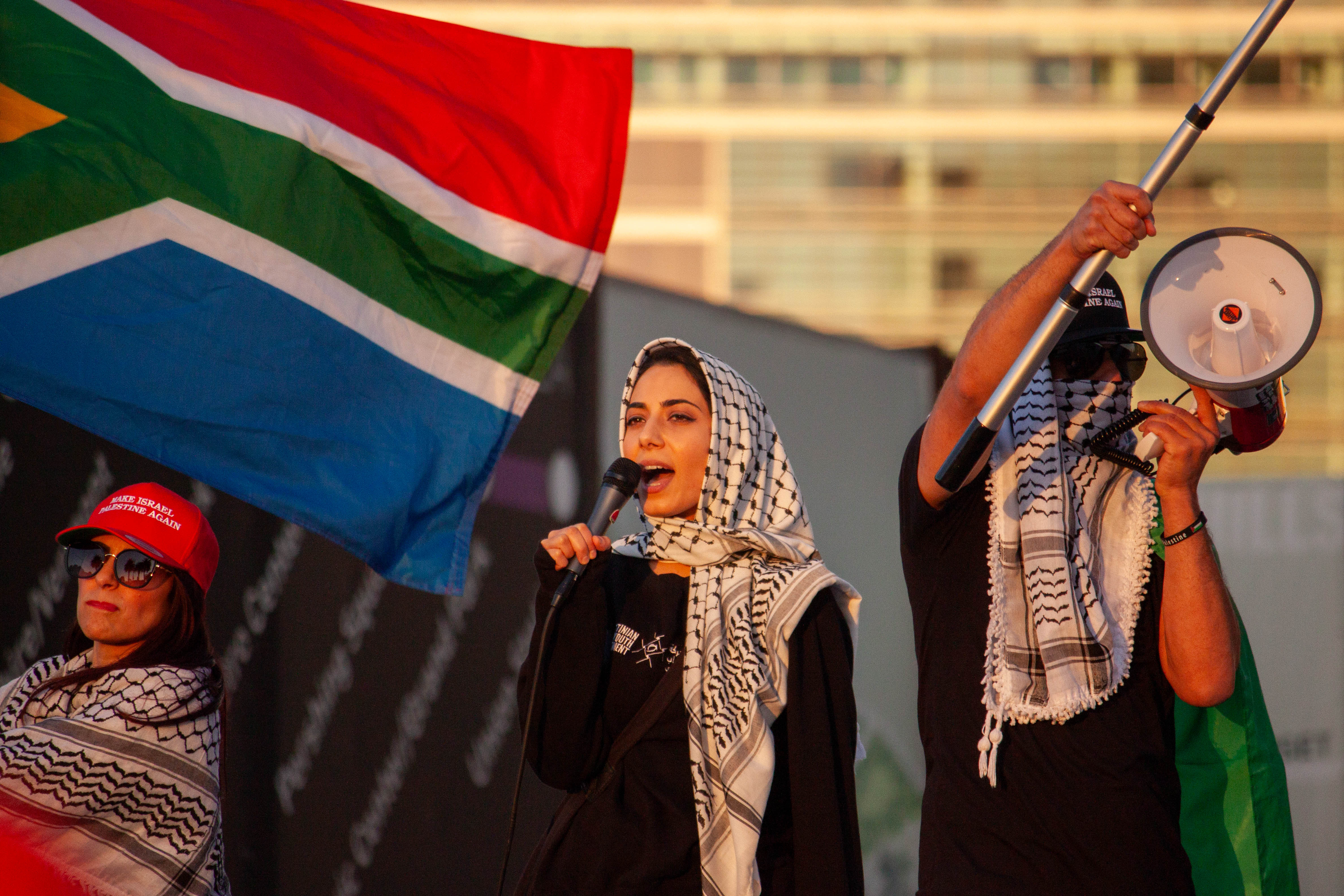
Protests against the Rafah offensive in Los Angeles at the Wilshire Federal Building in February 2024

Over a thousand pro-Palestine protesters assembled outside Biden's December 8 campaign fundraiser event. LAPD used the term "first amendment events" in regard to the protest, but declared the demonstration "unlawful" at 5:45 PM. On December 14, 75 Jewish protesters were arrested for blocking the 110 Freeway.

On January 1, 2024, about 50 protesters calling for a ceasefire and "justice for Palestine" stopped the Rose Parade in Pasadena for 10 minutes. Khalid Abdalla wore a white armband and a dove pin to the 81st Golden Globe Awards to call for a ceasefire. Hundreds protested outside the Grammy Awards calling a ceasefire, while singer Annie Lennox called for a ceasefire on stage.

On February 12, hundreds protested the treatment of Palestinians in Gaza in a "Hands off Rafah" protest outside the Wilshire Federal Building in Westwood.

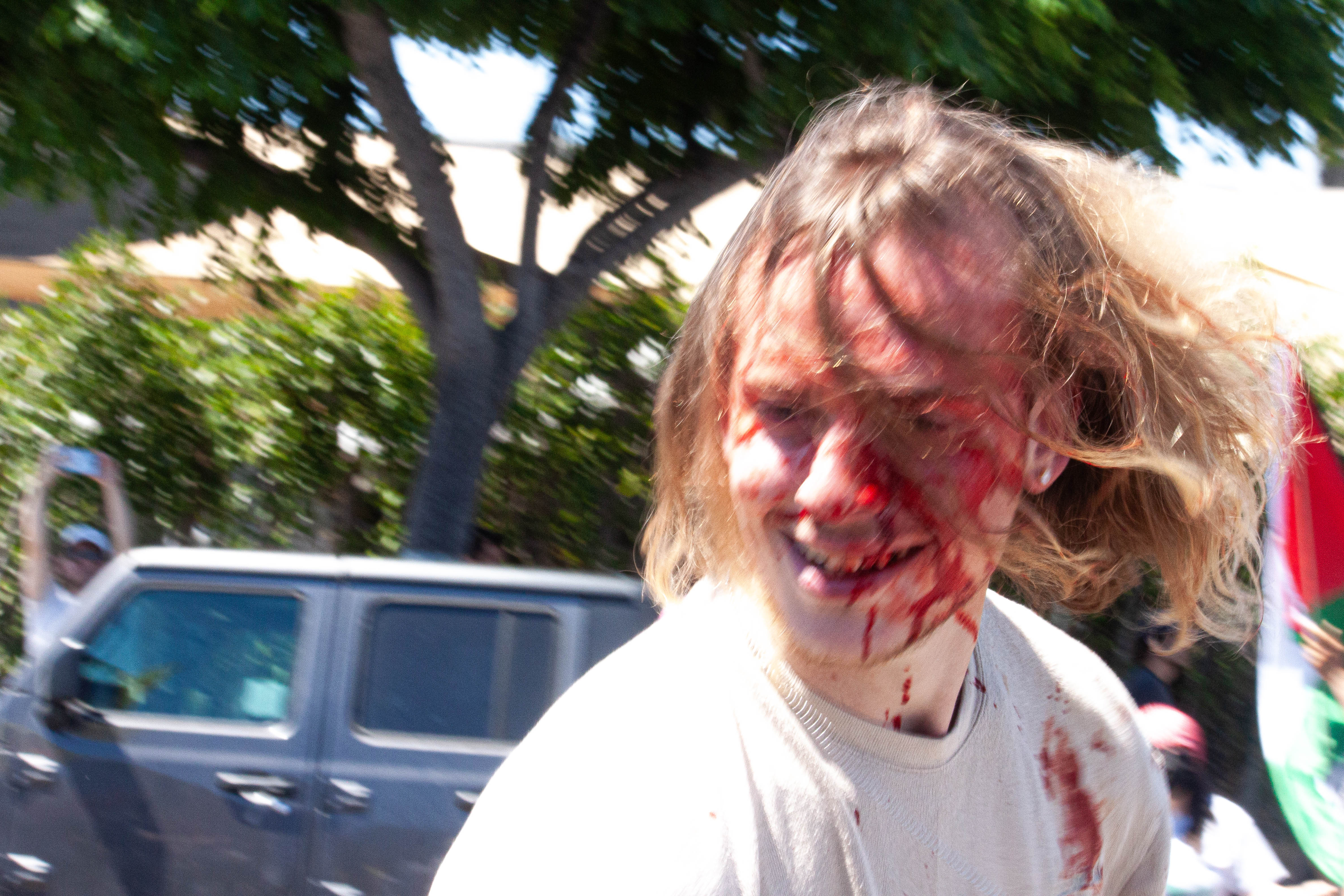
A bloodied protester at a demonstration, in front of Adas Torah synagogue in Los Angeles, which was hosting an event about real estate in Israel and occupied West Bank. There were violent clashes between the anti-Israel participants and pro-Israel counter-protesters, June 23, 2024

On March 10, about a thousand people blocked streets at the Dolby Theatre, delaying attendees' arrival at the 96th Academy Awards. The largest groups organizing the protest belonged to "Film Workers for Palestine" and "SAG-AFTRA Members for Ceasefire". Celebrities at the event, including Oscar nominees and winners, wore Palestinian flag pins and red buttons distributed by an advocacy group called Artists4Ceasefire.

On April 10, a student led group called Pomona Divest from Apartheid at Pomona College occupied an administration building.

On May 27, pro-Palestinian protesters blocked the 101 Freeway in downtown Los Angeles.

On June 23, pro-Palestinian demonstrators attempted to block people from entering the main entrance of the Adas Torah synagogue, which was hosting a seminar about real estate in Israel and the West Bank. The demonstration deteriorated into violent clashes between the anti-Israel participants and pro-Israel counter-protesters. President Biden tweeted "I'm appalled by the scenes outside of Adas Torah synagogue in Los Angeles. Intimidating Jewish congregants is dangerous, unconscionable, antisemitic, and un-American."

On October 5, hundreds protested in Pershing Square as the anniversary of October 7 approached.

==== San Diego ====
On October 15, hundreds demonstrated for Gaza outside the San Diego County Administration Building. On October 21, hundreds of protesters organized by San Diego Coalition for Palestine shut down streets downtown. On November 9, hundreds protested outside the headquarters of defense contractor Northrup Grumman demanding a ceasefire. Later that same day, medical students, staff and other workers at UC San Diego School of Medicine staged a solidarity walkout to protest the public health crisis in Gaza. Both of these protests were part of the international "Shut it Down for Palestine" event. On Black Friday, marchers participated in a die-in at a mall in Escondido. On December 2, around 125 pro-Palestinian protesters disrupted a tree-lighting ceremony in Balboa Park. On December 23, protesters calling for a ceasefire marched through Balboa Park for two and half hours. On April 24, 2024, dozens of Jewish and Palestinian American protesters rallied in Balboa Park and then delivered letters calling for a ceasefire to representative Sara Jacobs' home nearby. On October 4, about one thousand protesters marched in a pro-Palestinian rally in downtown.

==== San Francisco Bay Area ====
===== Public figures and officials =====
On October 16, District Attorney Brooke Jenkins posted and then deleted a post on X where she called the demonstration of anti-war protesters a "pro-Hamas rally". During the APEC conference, protesters demonstrated outside a fundraiser attended by Joe Biden and Kamala Harris, demanding an immediate ceasefire. Dozens of Code Pink anti-war protesters gathered outside of Nancy Pelosi's home on December 3, calling for a ceasefire. 700 staffers at mostly progressive Jewish organizations published an open-letter to Biden, calling for a ceasefire.

On January 29, 2024, Nancy Pelosi was filmed telling a protester to "Go back to China" after they asked her to a call for a ceasefire. On February 23, protesters marched inside the Fairmont Hotel, where Joe Biden was staying during a fundraising trip, chanting, "Biden, Biden you can’t hide, we charge you with genocide". Protesters also demonstrated outside his fundraising event. On May 20, about 30 protesters demonstrated outside a Harvard Club of San Francisco event that Nancy Pelosi was speaking at. One was arrested for disrupting the speech inside.

===== Schools and universities =====
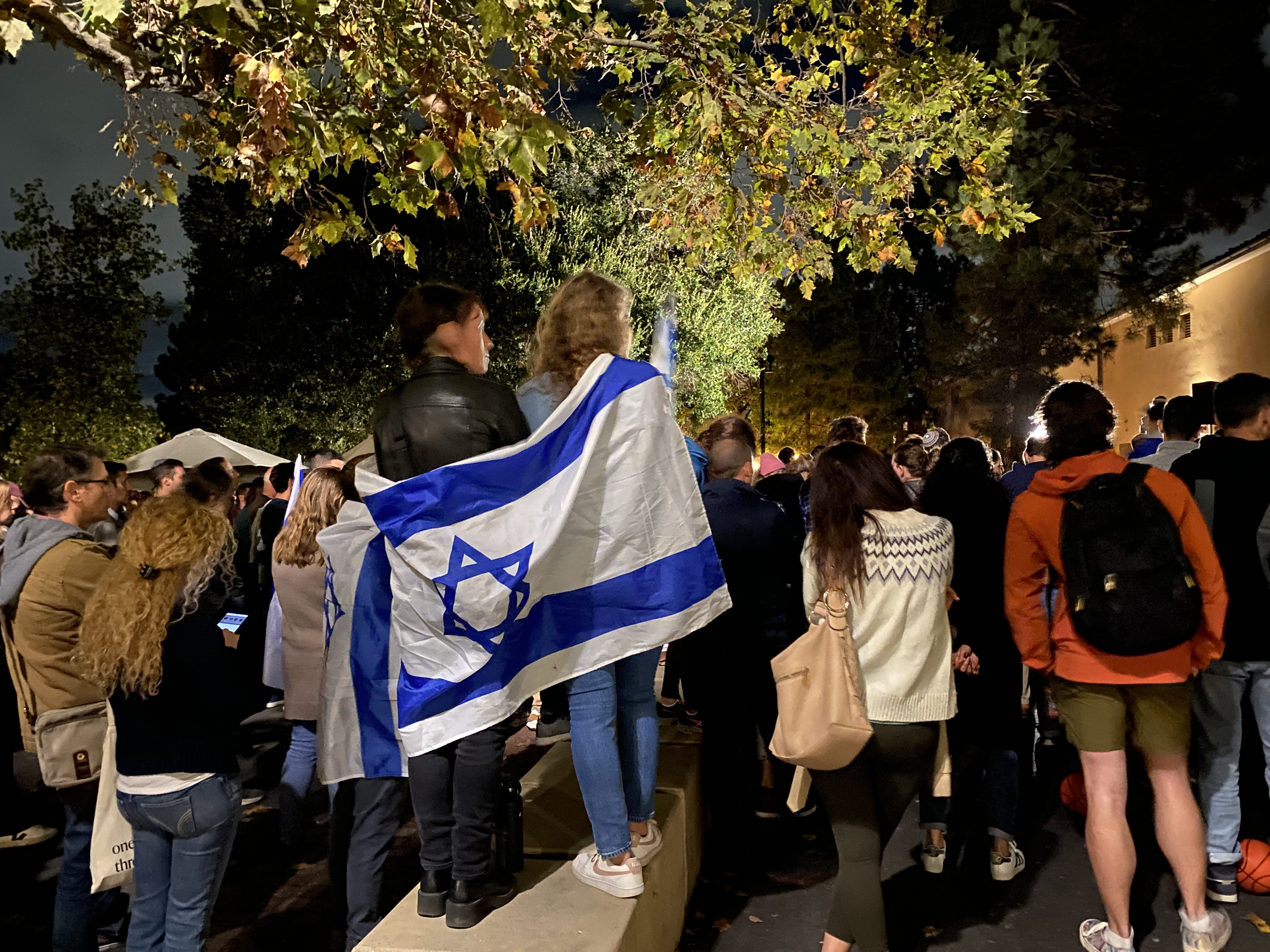
Pro-Israel rally at Stanford University, October 10, 2023

On October 18, high school students across San Francisco walked out of class in protest of the bombing of Gaza and to demand an immediate ceasefire. Fremont High School in Oakland drew headlines for raising the Palestinian flag on the campus' main flagpole. Students at UC Berkeley hung a banner with the Palestinian flag on Sather Tower in an unauthorized protest. In the Central Valley, students at Stanislaus State, UC Merced and Fresno State held protests in late October. On April 22, students at Cal Poly Humboldt occupied an administration building "in solidarity with students across the nation...for Palestine". Arcata City Councilmember Sara Schaefer called the massive police response "overkill".

===== Rallies, protests, and marches =====
In San Francisco, several hundred peaceful protesters marched on October 15 in support of Gaza. On October 19, the San Francisco chapter of Jewish Voice for Peace chained themselves to the San Francisco Federal Building in protest at Israeli actions in Gaza. On October 28, around 15,000 protesters marched in San Francisco, shutting down the Central Freeway for more than an hour. In advance of the Asia-Pacific Economic Cooperation summit, protesters marked a self-driving car with "Free Gaza". On November 5, a Jewish-led group of activists protested a gala for the Friends of the Israel Defense Forces at the Hiller Aviation Museum in San Carlos. Hundreds of anti-war protesters were arrested for occupying the Oakland Federal Building. On December 16, around 500 Google employees protested the company's $1.2 billion Project Nimbus contract with the Israeli military and government.

On April 5, 2024, a rally organized by a group called "Vigil4Gaza" protested outside of the Palo Alto City Hall. On April 17, nine Google employees were arrested on charges of trespassing after staging a sit-in at the company's Sunnyvale campus in protest against Project Nimbus. On June 3, seventy people were arrested for occupying the Israeli consulate in San Francisco.

===== Ports, roads, and bridges =====
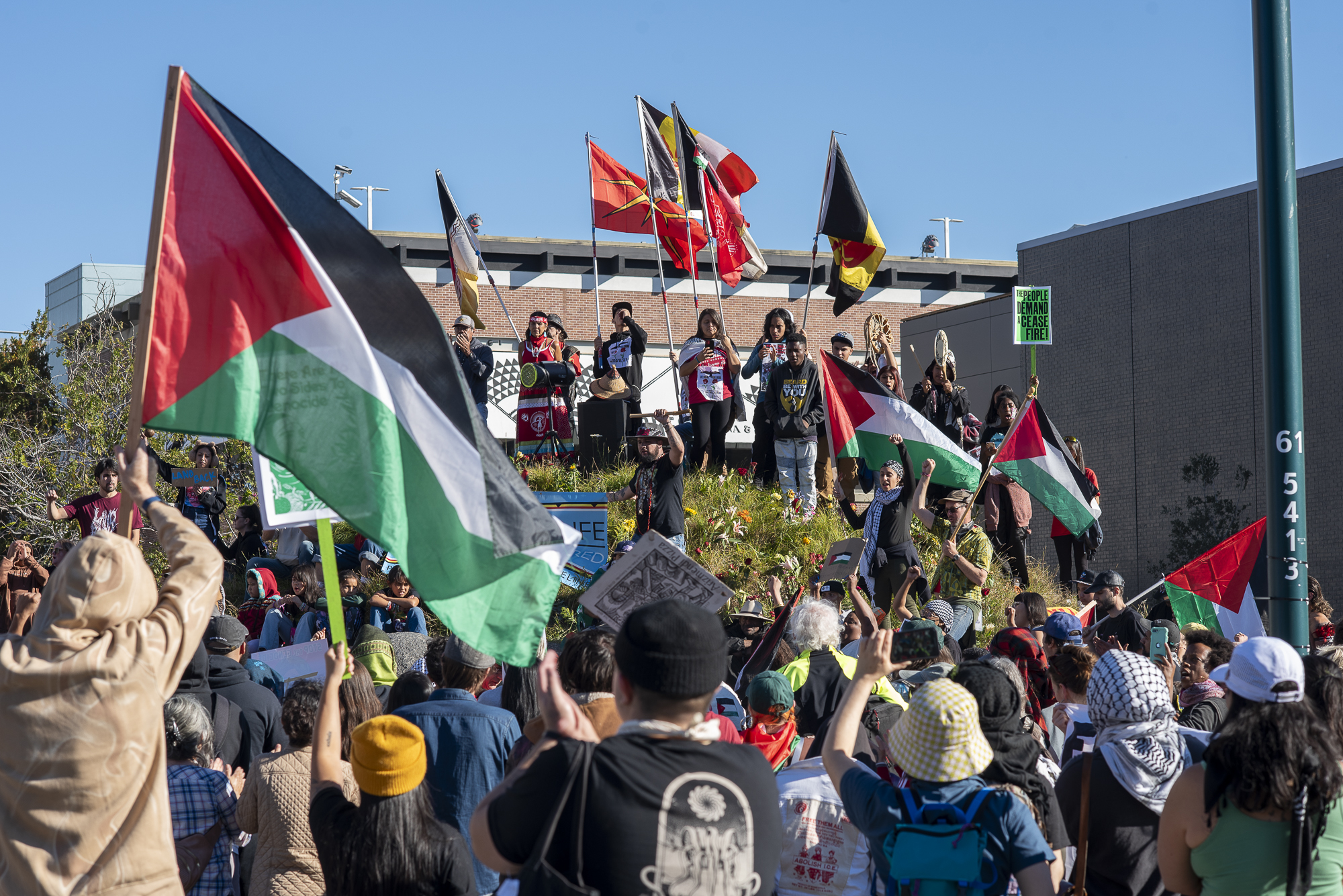
Pro-Palestine protest in Emeryville, California, November 24, 2023

On November 3, 2023, 200 protesters at the Port of Oakland chained themselves to the US military supply ship MV Cape Orlando to prevent its departure to Israel. Anti-war protesters chained themselves together, blocking all traffic on the San Francisco–Oakland Bay Bridge. On December 6, hundreds of protesters laid children's shoes outside of the Golden Gate Bridge to symbolize children killed during the conflict. Afterwards, interfaith groups marched from both ends meeting in the middle to call for a ceasefire. One protester was arrested for climbing a flagpole and putting up a Palestine flag. Protesters demonstrating against the planned Rafah offensive blocked the Golden Gate Bridge on February 16, 2024. On February 21, protesters blocked Highway 101 to demand Biden to stop arming Israel and enact an immediate ceasefire. In March 2024, a group of activists built a sign in South San Francisco visible from airplanes taking off from San Francisco International Airport (SFO) calling for an end of military aid to Israel. Protesters at SFO shut down multiple security gates and roadways leading to the airport, holding banners that read "Stop Arming Israel". On March 31, protesters chained themselves to the USNS Harvey Milk at Pier 32 in San Francisco.

=== Colorado ===
In May 2025, a pro-Palestinian protest was held in Denver against Congressman Jason Crow for repeatedly accepting campaign donations from executives of Palantir Technologies, which provides intelligence and surveillance services to the Israel Defense Forces (IDF) in the Gaza war.

=== Idaho ===
In Boise, protesters set up an encampment in front of the Idaho State Capitol in early May 2024. The encampment was removed by police several days later. On July 11, the director of the Idaho Department of Administration sued to repeal a 2014 injunction allowing "symbolic tents" at the Idaho Capitol Annex. Protesters organized by Boise to Palestine, Friends of Idaho, BSU Students for Palestine and the People’s University were named in the suit.

=== Montana ===
In Missoula, pro-Palestine protesters denounced neo-Nazis who had tried to join their demonstration at the Missoula County Courthouse and had called for Jews to be "stopped". Analysts said these actions were part of attempts of neo-Nazis and other far right groups to hijack pro-Palestine and anti-Israel events to promote anti-semitic and anti-immigrant ideals.

=== Oregon ===
On October 29, activists in Portland protested against the war, asking US Senator Jeff Merkley to call for a ceasefire. Pro-Palestine students protested at Portland State University on November 8, calling for the university to cut ties with Boeing, which sells weapons to Israel. On November 17, Portland's chapter of the Party for Socialism and Liberation organized a protest that blocked the entrance to a Boeing manufacturing plant.

On May 2, a group calling itself "Rachel Corrie's Ghost Brigade" reported that it had cut through a fence at a Portland police facility and burned 17 police cars. Rachel Corrie was an American activist who died in 2003 while protesting the IDF's destruction of Palestinian houses in Gaza; she was crushed by an Israeli bulldozer and died.

=== Washington ===
On October 29, hundreds demonstrated in Seattle's Pioneer Square to support Israel's war on Hamas. On November 3, Jewish Voice for Peace activists in Seattle demonstrated outside the Henry M. Jackson Federal Building, demanding US Senator Patty Murray to call for a ceasefire. On November 6, an estimated 300 people blocked the entrance of the Port of Tacoma to prevent longshoremen from loading suspected military equipment and weapons onto the MV Cape Orlando. On November 11, a protest organized by the Samidoun blocked streets near Westlake Center in Seattle. On November 19, hundreds called for a ceasefire at the Space Needle. The rally was organized by Jewish Voice for Peace.

On December 7, University of Washington police in Seattle detained 36 people for occupying an administration building with demands that the school stop funding Israel and Boeing. Protesters blocked and closed a highway on January 7, 2024. On March 13, protesters demonstrated outside the Aerospace and Defense Summit to oppose Boeing's military ties with Israel.

== Territories ==
On January 27, 2024, protesters gathered outside the offices of Delegate James Moylan in Hagåtña, Guam, calling for a ceasefire.

In Puerto Rico, several dozen protesters gathered to protest against Vice President Kamala Harris during her visit to San Juan on March 22, 2024.

In the United States Virgin Islands, a protest march was held on Saint Croix on November 4, 2023.

== Responses ==
=== Universities ===
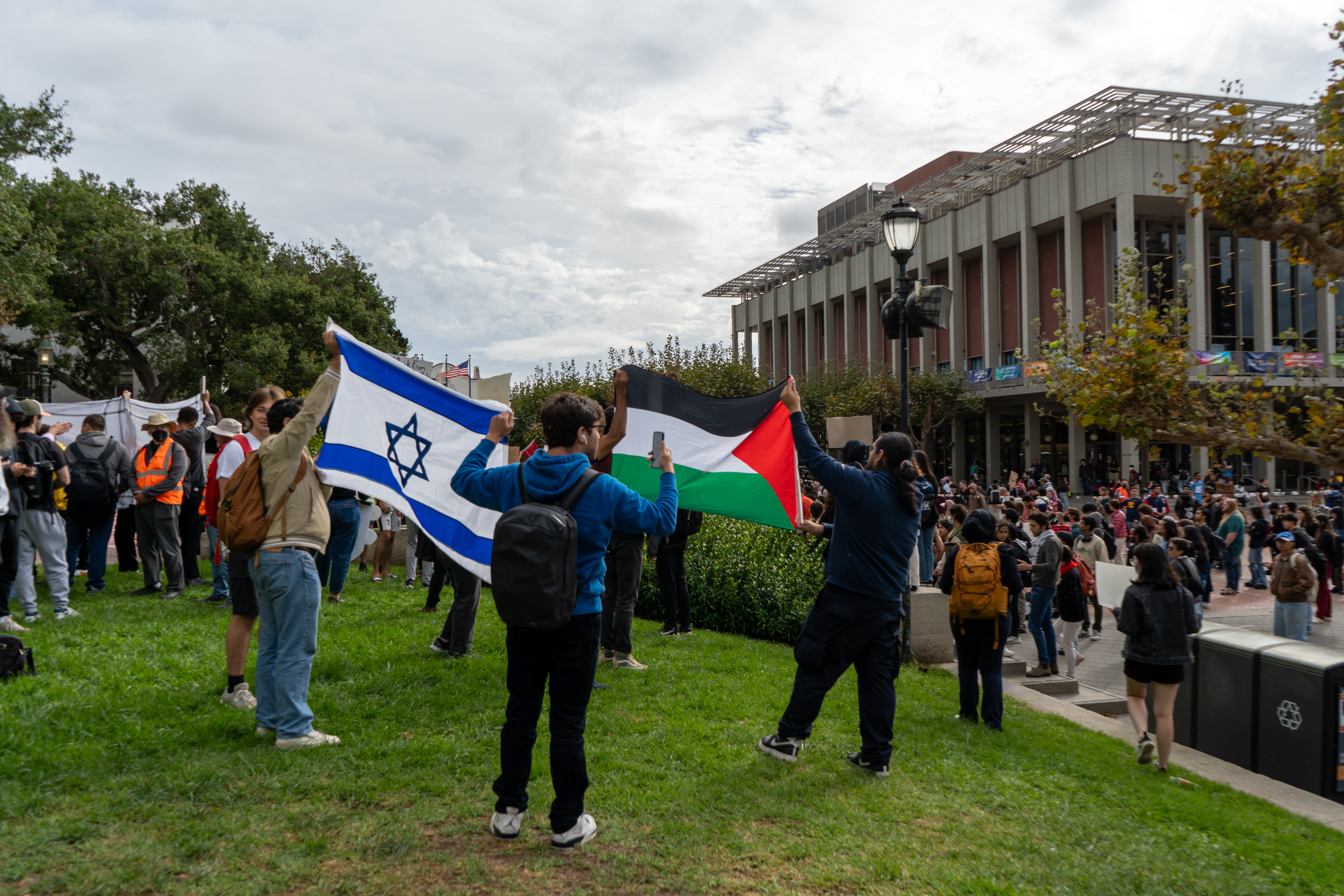
Protester and counter-protester on Sproul Plaza at UC Berkeley, October 25, 2023

On November 6, Brandeis University became the first private university in the United States to ban its student chapter of Students for Justice in Palestine, saying that the leading factor in their decision was "the SJP’s support of militant group Hamas". A student spokesperson for the SJP chapter disputed this claim, calling it "unsubstantiated" and saying "we have not received any evidence that can lead to the suppression of our right to free speech." The Foundation for Individual Rights and Expression said that "None of the chants or slogans cited by President Liebowitz come close to meeting the legal criteria for incitement or harassment," and that "Brandeis is punishing its students for nothing more than protected political advocacy." On November 10, Columbia University suspended its campus chapters of Students for Justice in Palestine and Jewish Voice for Peace for repeated violations of campus event policies, thus barring them from hosting events on campus. Columbia's decision was criticized by Naomi Klein and Noura Erakat. After Harvard University president Claudine Gay condemned the slogan "from the river to the sea", more than 100 faculty signed an open letter criticizing her censure. On December 14, Rutgers University became the first public university to suspend its campus chapter of Students for Justice in Palestine in response to complaints of disruptive behavior and vandalism. Donors to top universities in the United States withdrew millions of dollars in donations in light of the universities' responses to Hamas' offensive.

On October 24, Ray Rodrigues, the Chancellor of the State University System of Florida issued an order to disband all existing chapters of National Students for Justice in Palestine (NSJP) in the system. Chapters at University of Florida and University of South Florida have filed federal lawsuits against several parties including Rodrigues and Gov. Ron Desantis on constitutional grounds over the move. On December 5, the Louisiana Department of Education opened a civil-rights investigation against Tulane University after a fight occurred at a pro-Palestine rally on October 26. American University announced it was banning protests inside university buildings. The Muslim Legal Fund of America sued Harvard University for failing to protect Muslim and Arab students from harassment. The American Civil Liberties Union published an open letter urging colleges not to initiate "baseless investigations" into pro-Palestinian student groups.

The Israeli Ministry of Foreign Affairs announced on November 25 it was forming a task force to combat "those generating antisemitism on campuses" in the United States. In February 2024, the ACLU signed a letter to US Secretary of Education Miguel Cardona calling on him to reject redefining antisemitism to include political criticism of the government of the state of Israel, saying it would lead to First Amendment violations.

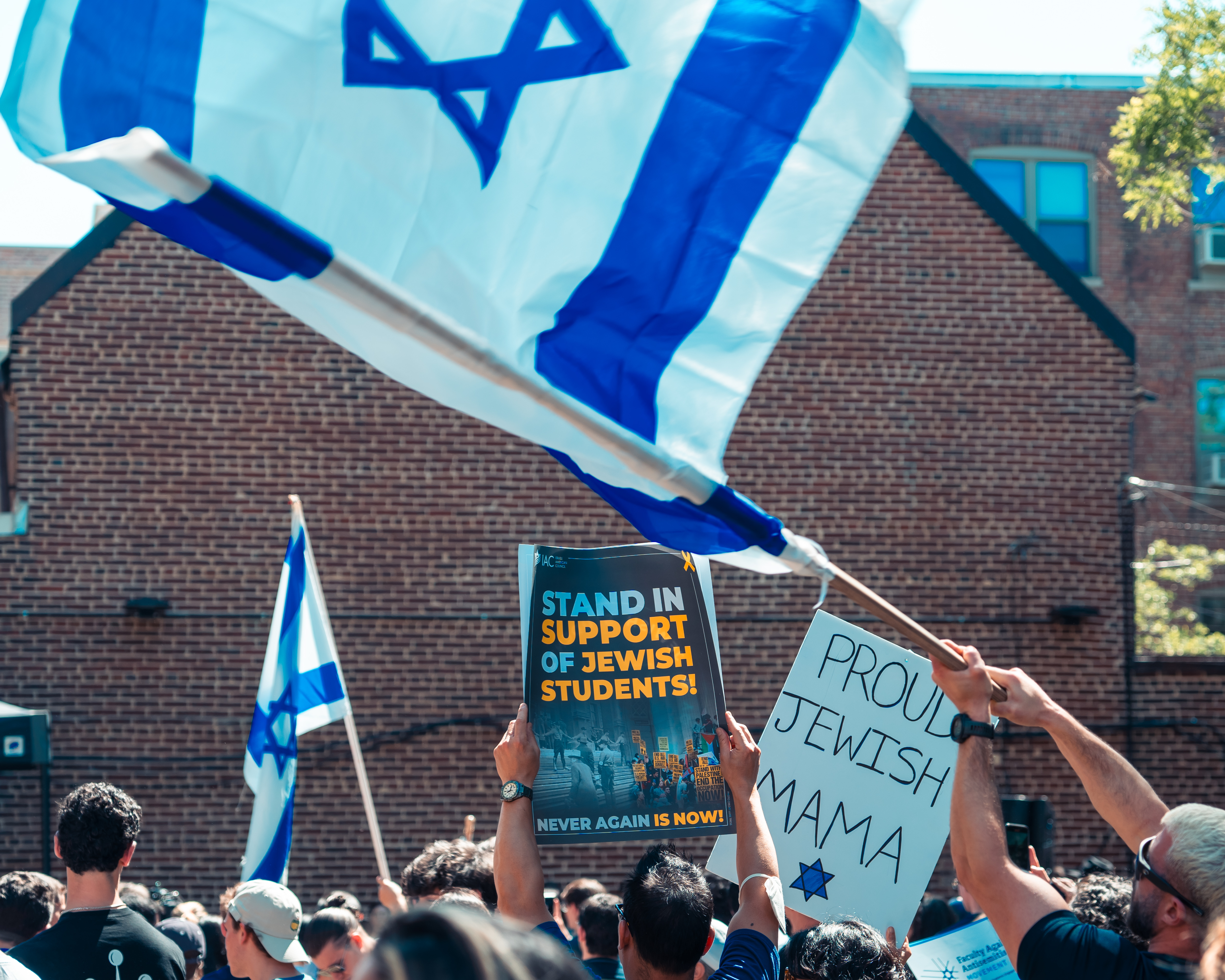
Protest against antisemitism on American campuses at George Washington University in Washington, D.C., May 2024

After Bret Gustafson, a Washu professor, posted online in support of a protest outside of the home of the president of AIPAC, the university stated that Gustafson's views do not reflect the university's, and that they would not tolerate "discrimination, harassment or threatening behavior". Jairo Fúnez-Flores, a professor at Texas Tech University, was suspended for his social media posts related to the conflict. Michel DeGraff, a professor of linguistics at the Massachusetts Institute of Technology was issued formal reprimands and denied a pay raise after he proposed to teach a course on language used to describe the Israeli-Palestinian conflict. Maura Finkelstein at Muhlenberg College was fired for reposting a post by Remi Kanazi on Instagram.

Elizabeth Magill, the president of the University of Pennsylvania, resigned on December 9 following congressional testimony in which she said that the question of whether calls for an "intifada" or uses of the phrase "from the river to the sea" violate the university's code of conduct is a "context-dependent decision". In January 2024, Indiana University fired Abdulkader Sinno, a tenured political science professor, in response to political pressure from the state's Republican legislators. Students at Northwestern University faced criminal charges for publishing a pro-Palestinian parody newspaper under a law originally used to combat the Ku Klux Klan. The New York chapter of the ACLU told Columbia University that the university must reinstate its chapters of Jewish Voice for Peace and Students for Justice in Palestine or face a legal challenge for First Amendment violations. On March 12, the New York Civil Liberties Union and Palestine Legal sued Columbia University for banning the groups.

Students in the United States have reported fears of losing future job opportunities for engaging in protests against military action in Gaza. By April 2024, hundreds of students had been arrested, suspended, put on probation, and expelled, including 50 students who had been arrested at Barnard. In June 2024, legislators in Pennsylvania introduced a bill that would block state funding for any college or university that divests from "commercial financial activity in Israel", unless it were for poor investment performance. In October 2024, the ACLU, Amnesty International, and Human Rights Watch wrote a joint statement warning that law enforcement on 20 U.S. college campuses had used potentially excessive force against pro-Palestinian protestors, in violation of international law.

In October 2025, Kent Syverud, the chancellor of Syracuse University, stated that the protests on campus seemed to have been encouraged by Iran. He said that, although there was an initially welcoming atmosphere for both pro-Israel and pro-Palestinian activities during the early months of October 2023, a noticeable shift occurred later. Syverud expressed his belief that Iran played a significant role in fostering the demonstrations, saying out that there was little to no involvement from the university's own students in the protests.

=== Doxxing ===
The Israel on Campus Coalition reportedly engaged in covert espionage against pro-Palestinian student organizations. Accuracy in Media sent doxxing trucks to Yale and Columbia, displaying the names and faces of students under a banner labeling them "leading antisemites" on campus. Canary Mission published the identities and images of Harvard students involved in the issue of an open letter, published on October 7, that held "the Israeli regime entirely responsible for all unfolding violence".

=== Firings ===
Susan Sarandon was dropped in November 2023 by United Talent Agency in response to comments she made at a pro-Palestinian rally she attended that month; Sarandon later apologized for the phrasing of her remarks. A Google employee was fired for "interfering with an official company-sponsored event" after he interrupted Barak Regev by stating, "I refuse to build technology that empowers genocide." In May 2024, a nurse at NYU Langone Health was fired for calling the war a genocide. In October 2024, Microsoft employees were fired after organizing a vigil for Palestinians killed in Gaza.

=== Political ===
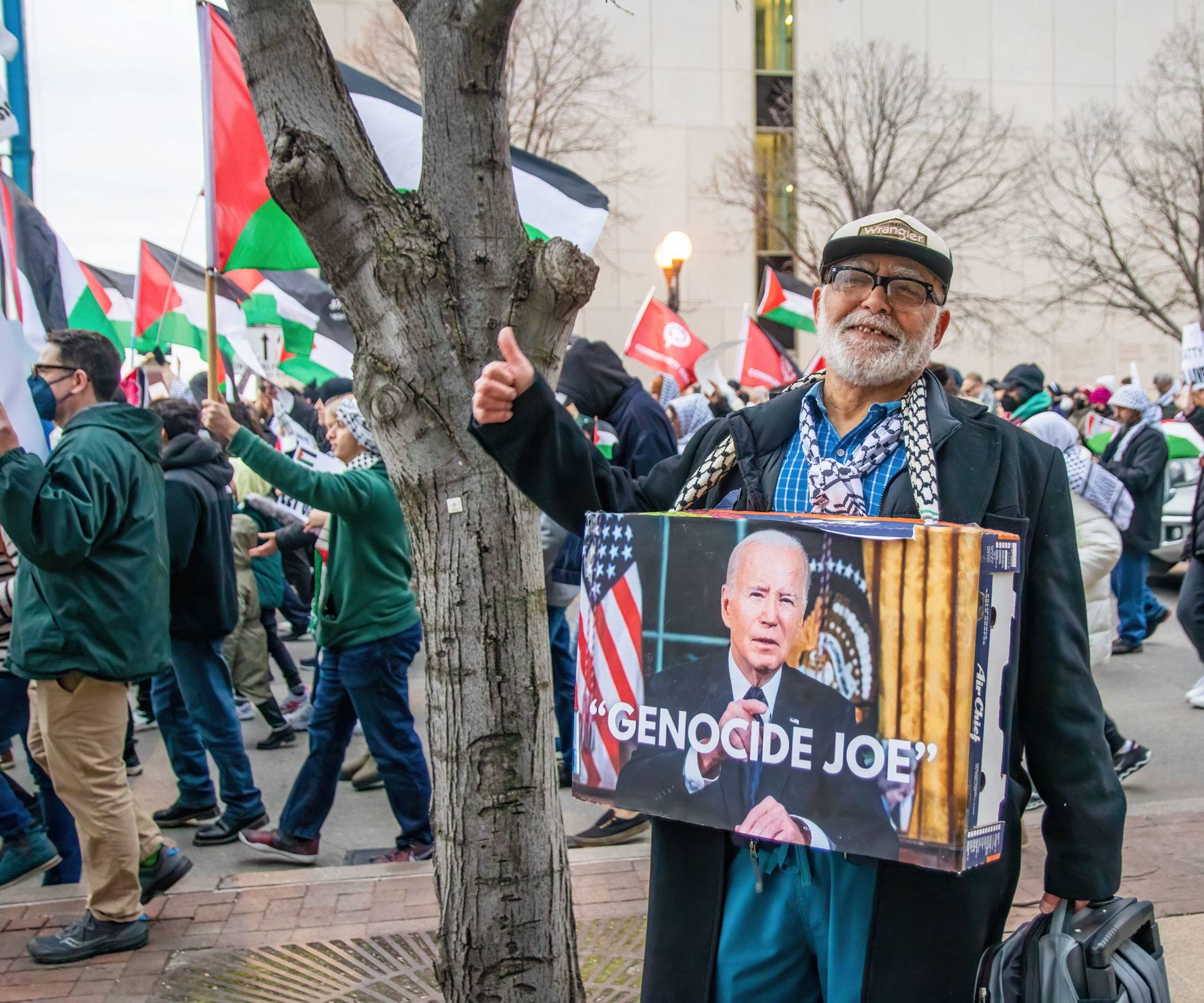
Pro-Palestinian protest in Columbus, Ohio, December 22, 2023

Nancy Pelosi drew condemnation after suggesting that some anti-war protesters were being funded by Vladimir Putin and should be investigated by the FBI. Abdullah Hammoud, the Democratic mayor of Dearborn, Michigan (a city with one of the largest Arab American communities), wrote: "So, based on Nancy Pelosi’s remarks, 76% of Democrats / 49% of Republicans / 61% of Americans are potentially paid operatives of Russia who are pushing Putin’s message of calling for a ceasefire?"

In October 2024, the Heritage Foundation released a document titled "Project Esther: A National Strategy to Combat Antisemitism", which detailed a plan to go after what it termed the "Hamas Support Network", consisting of nonprofits and activist groups such as American Muslims for Palestine, Jewish Voice for Peace, and Students for Justice in Palestine.

==== Lobbying ====
The American Israel Public Affairs Committee sent an email to its supporters asking them to email their senators in opposition to a measure introduced by US Senator Bernie Sanders to investigate Israel's human rights practices.

On January 10, 2024, The Jewish Forward reported that the Anti-Defamation League was including pro-Palestine rallies in its tallies of anti-Semitic incidents in the United States.

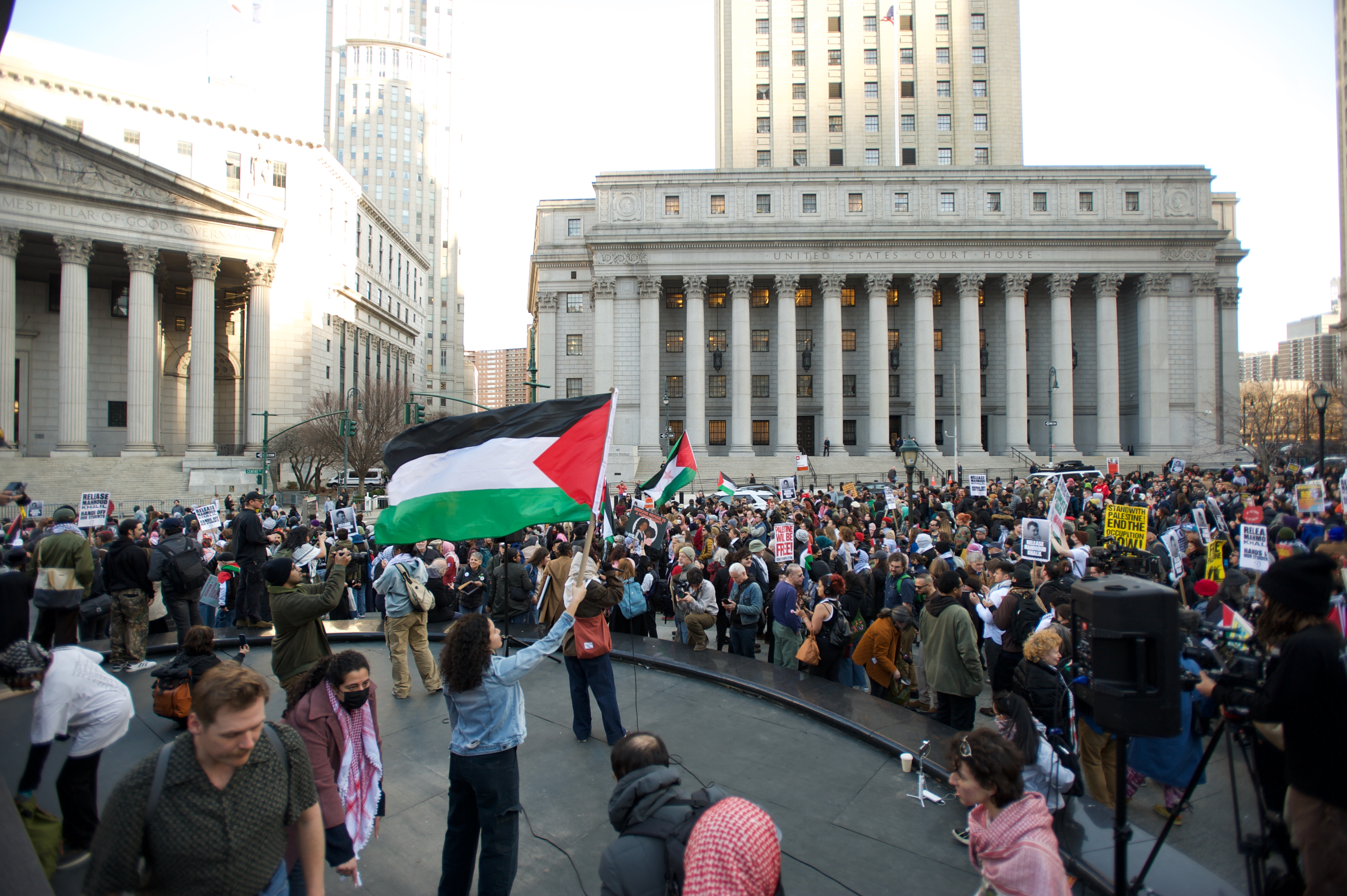
Protest against the detention of Mahmoud Khalil in New York City, March 10, 2025

Civil rights groups American-Arab Anti-Discrimination Committee and Palestine Legal described the response to criticism of Israel in the United States as "McCarthyite".

==== Legislation ====
In January 2024, Senators Thom Tillis and Marsha Blackburn introduced the Safe and Open Streets Act to make it a federal crime to block a public road or highway, as a way to criminalize pro-Palestinian protests.

In September 2024, Nassau County, New York passed a face mask ban, resulting in the arrest of a 26-year-old protester.

The "Antisemitism Awareness Act", spearheaded by the Republicans but also backed by many Democrats, passed the United States House of Representatives in a 320–91 vote on May 1, 2024, and proceeded to the Senate. The bill was intended to add the International Holocaust Remembrance Alliance's approved working definition of antisemitism to title VI of the Civil Rights Act of 1964, which prohibits "exclusion from participation in, denial of benefits of, and discrimination under federally assisted programs on ground of race, color, or national origin". Democratic Representative Sara Jacobs, who is Jewish, said she opposed the bill because "it fail[ed] to effectively address the very real rise of antisemitism, all while defunding colleges and universities across the country and punishing many, if not all, of the non-violent protestors speaking out against the Israeli military’s conduct."

The proposed legislation would have broadened the legal definition of antisemitism to include anti-Zionism, criticism of the policies of the state of Israel, and concerns about Palestinian human rights, by categorizing all of that as hate speech, and it has been criticized for conflating "Judaism with Zionism in assuming that all Jews are Zionists" and automatic citizens of Israel rather than the U.S., thereby severely undermining genuine safety for Jewish citizens. It faced strong opposition from several Democratic lawmakers, Jewish organizations, and free speech advocates, including more than 800 Jewish U.S. academics, who signed a letter calling on Biden not to sign the bill.

Pro-Israel protest in Washington, D.C. in October 2024

Jeremy Ben-Ami, president of the centrist pro-Israel group J Street, said that his organization opposed the bill because it was an "unserious" effort led by Republicans "to continually force votes that divide the Democratic caucus on an issue that shouldn't be turned into a political football".

The ACLU, in a press release on April 26, said the bill was an attack on First Amendment rights and argued that its "overbroad" definition of antisemitism "could result in colleges and universities suppressing a wide variety of speech critical of Israel or in support of Palestinian rights in an effort to avoid investigations by the Department [of Education] and the potential loss of funding". Organizations like the Anti-Defamation League and Conference of Presidents have praised the bill, and it is based on definitions by the International Holocaust Remembrance Alliance that have been criticized by 100 Israeli and international civil society organizations that wrote to the United Nations Secretary General Antonio Guterres in 2023 urging the UN not to adopt the definitions. (Note: Attributed to multiple sources:)

The bill was never voted on in the Senate, but was reintroduced in the 119th Congress by Tim Scott.

==== Investigations ====
On January 24, 2024, Palestine Legal stated it had received reports of activists who had written social media posts "criticizing Israel's genocide of Palestinians in Gaza" being visited by the FBI. In March 2024, faculty at the University of Pennsylvania sued the school to prevent it from sending documents related to pro-Palestinian protests on campus to Congress, stating they opposed the "new form of McCarthyism, in which accusations of anti-Semitism are substituted for insinuations of Communist leanings which were the tool of oppression in the 1950s".

=== Lawsuits ===
In May 2024, nine Israelis sued American pro-Palestinian advocacy organizations in federal court in Virginia for spreading "propaganda" in the United States; the plaintiffs were made up of six survivors of the October 7 attack, one sibling of a victim of the attack, and two people who were displaced from their homes in the aftermath of the attack. A lawyer for American Muslims for Palestine called it "absolutely a threat to free speech", and "a threat to free speech on any front." The lawsuit was dismissed by the court in February 2026.

=== Analysis ===
For legal scholar Shirin Sinnar, the repression of campus protests from university administrators in the 2023–24 academic year facilitated authoritarianism under the Trump administration, arguing that the "failure to rebut politicized narratives that pro-Palestine protests were rampant with violence, antisemitism, and lawlessness has made it harder for academic institutions to resist the even greater weaponization of such caricatures now." Sinnar adds:

The denunciation of these protests as violating the norms of civil disobedience, based on simplistic understandings of theories of civil disobedience, has made it easier to cast student protestors as agents of chaos and disorder without a moral message and demand on society. It is far easier to punish higher education institutions for permitting protests—and to disappear students from their dorm rooms and the streets—when campus protestors have been vilified over the course of more than a year. The new speech and protest policies that many colleges and universities adopted, even before the Trump administration returned to power, challenged the rule of law within these institutions, whether viewed in formalist, substantive, governance, or procedural terms. Having ceded so much ground already, it is a small step for some colleges and universities to acquiesce entirely to the relentless threats now levied against them. Such acquiescence will not only undermine these institutions' missions of research and teaching, but also undercut their ability to act as an independent preserve of inquiry and dissent in the face of mounting authoritarianism.

== See also ==
- Gaza war protest vote movements
- Arab Spring
- George Floyd protests
- March for Our Lives
- Occupy Wall Street
- Vietnam War protests
- List of U.S. officials who resigned over Biden's support for Israel in the Gaza war
- List of incidents of civil unrest in the United States
