= List of antisemitic incidents in the United States =

Civil rights groups in the United States, such as the Anti-Defamation League (ADL), American Jewish Committee (AJC) and Simon Wiesenthal Center (SWC), catalog antisemitic incidents, including assaults, harassment, vandalism, violence and threats of violence.

== History ==
Research has shown a rising level of antisemitism since the 2010s.

According to the FBI's 2023 statistics, antisemitic incidents accounted for 68% of all religion-based hate crimes, a 63% bump vis-à-vis 2022. The American Jewish Committee (AJC) commented that it was likely much lower than the actual number as hate crimes had been widely underreported across the country. The ADL reported an increase in antisemitic incidents in 2023, which they said was due partly to their new methodology; this methodology was disputed by some current and former staff, especially the definition of antisemitism being used.

Scholars said the rise signaled a shift in the nature and prevalence of antisemitism in United States that portended a return to the era of explicit and pervasive antisemitism. According to an August 2024 survey by the NGO Combat Antisemitism Movement, 3.5 million Jews in America have experienced antisemitism since the Gaza war. Of the 1,075 American Jews interviewed, 28% heard "Jews care too much about money", 25% heard "Jews control the world", 14% heard "American Jews care more about Israel than about the US", and 13% heard "the Holocaust did not happen" or its severity has been "exaggerated".

== List ==
Fatal incidents

Date	Reported type	Dead	Injured	Location	Details
August 16, 2026	Assault	0	1	Surfside, Florida	A local resident was arrested after assaulting a Jewish couple visiting from New York City, one of whom recorded the attack on their cellphone. During the attack, the individual made antisemitic remarks, punched the man in the head and said "Now you're going to die. Walk away before I kill you." The individual was charged with battery with prejudice and for harassment / intimidation based on the individual's religious or ethnic heritage.
August 13, 2026	Assault	0	1	Manhattan, New York City	An individual entered the Central Synagogue, attacking a congregant during Friday night Sabbath services, before being arrested by an NYPD officer serving a security detail at the congregation. The individual arrested was charged with both state and federal hate crimes, which have a maximum sentence of 20 years in prison, with Harmeet K. Dhillon, Assistant U.S. Attorney General, stating that "the Department of Justice will intervene to protect the public in the face of antisemitic and racially motivated attacks".
July 23, 2026	Stabbing	0	2	Manhattan, New York City	In the 2026 Upper West Side stabbing attack, an individual shouting "Allahu Akbar" stabbed two people with a screwdriver, including a person leaving services at a local synagogue. The person arrested was indicted on state charges in September 2026, including four counts of attempted murder as a hate crime. An assistant district attorney said that a search of his cellphone had turned up antisemitic content. He pleaded not guilty to the ten counts included in the indictment.
March 12, 2026	Vehicle ramming	1	31	West Bloomfield, Michigan	The perpetrator drove a vehicle into Temple Israel,in Oakland County, Michigan. He then opened fire, he was shot dead by security guards. 8 injured were hospitalized and 30 first responders were treated for smoke inhalation.
June 1, 2025	Firebombing	1	13	Boulder, Colorado	An Egyptian national in the U.S. on an expired visa attacked a group of mostly Jewish people in Boulder, Colorado who were gathered in support of the release of hostages held by Hamas. He attacked with a garden sprayer full of gasoline and several molotov cocktails. Mohamed Sabry Soliman pleaded guilty to 100 state-level charges in May 2026 that included a first-degree murder charge, for which he received a life sentence with no possibility of parole; in October 2026, he changed his plea to guilty for a dozen federal charges that included a hate crime resulting in the death of Karen Diamond and seven counts of hate crimes causing bodily injury with intent to kill. The United States attorney stated that Soliman admitted that he acted based on his beliefs about the Israeli nationality and Jewish religion of his victims.
May 21, 2025	Shooting	2	0	Washington, D.C.	A thirty year old male shot and killed two Jewish employees of the Israeli embassy in Washington outside an event held at the Capital Jewish Museum. The attack was widely condemned as an act of antisemitism.
April 13, 2025	Arson	0	0	Harrisburg, Pennsylvania	Jewish American governor of Pennsylvania Josh Shapiro's residence was targeted by a lone-wolf terrorist with Molotov cocktails while he and his family slept inside. The attack was widely condemned as antisemitic by opinion writers, Muslim and Jewish organizations as well as members of both parties in Congress. Shapiro had faced antisemitism before over his support of Israel. The attack left a significant portion of the governor's mansion damaged.
December 16, 2024	Vandalism	0	0	Minneapolis, Minnesota	Swastikas were spray painted on the door and a pillar at Temple Israel in Minneapolis.
May 29, 2024	Vehicle-ramming attack	0	0	Canarsie, Brooklyn, New York	Outside Mesivta Nachlas Yakov, a Jewish high school in Brooklyn, a 58-year-old man yelled antisemitic slurs and then attempted to run down five people. The suspect was arrested nearby and charged with over a dozen counts including attempted murder as a hate crime. The incident was captured on camera.
November 5, 2023	Involuntary manslaughter	1	0	Thousand Oaks, California	Jewish American man Paul Kessler was a victim of suspected involuntary manslaughter. Suspect Loay Alnaji, a Moorpark College professor, hit Kessler's head with a megaphone over disagreement at a rally. Kessler fell with another hit and died of intracerebral hemorrhage. Alnaji has pleaded not guilty. Los Angeles Mayor Karen Bass issued a condemnation, While hate speech was heard at the scene of the crime, prosecutors have not been able to tie the hate speech to the person accused of killing Kessler. The Jewish Federation of Greater Los Angeles called it an "antisemitic crime".
April 20, 2022	Assault	0	1	Manhattan, New York	Attack on Matt Greenman: Matt Greenman, a Jewish man, was assaulted in an antisemitic hate crime in New York City while watching a rally organized by the group Within Our Lifetime. Saadah Masoud, one of the group's founders, pled guilty to the assault and was sentenced to 18 months in prison in March 2023.
January 15, 2022	Hostage taking	1	0	Colleyville, Texas	Colleyville synagogue hostage crisis: Four people were taken hostage by a British Pakistani at a synagogue. After a standoff with police, the attacker was killed and all hostages escaped unharmed.
October 31, 2021	Arson	0	0	Austin, Texas	Austin synagogue arson: 18-year old Franklin Barrett Sechriest set fire to the main doors of the sanctuary of Congregation Beth Israel, causing more than $250,000 in damage. Sechriest admitted he conducted the attack due to his hatred of Jews and had written, "I set a synagogue on fire," in his personal journal.
May 20, 2021	Gang attack	0	1	Times Square, Manhattan, New York	Attack on Joseph Borgen: During the 2021 Israel–Palestine crisis, five men attacked Joseph Borgen, a visibly Jewish man, as he walked through Times Square to a pro-Israel rally. Borgen was punched, kicked, bludgeoned with flag poles and a crutch, and maced and peppered spray, resulting in his hospitalization with a concussion. The attackers also yelled antisemitic slurs. Five activists were arrested, found guilty for the attack and received sentences of up to 7 years in prison.
April–May, 2021	Public school assignment	0	0	Tenafly, New Jersey	In early April 2021, a fifth-grade teacher at Maugham Elementary School instructed a 5th grade student to dress up as Adolf Hitler and to write a first-person essay from the perspective of the Nazi leader touting his "accomplishments" as a part of a class assignment. After initially defending the teacher and the school's actions, the board of Tenafly Public Schools suspended the teacher and the principal of the school with pay and opened an investigation into the incident.
December 29, 2019	Stabbing	1	4	Monsey, New York	Main articles: Monsey Hanukkah stabbing and Black Hebrew Israelites § Extremist fringe Masked and wielding a large blade, Grafton E. Thomas invaded the home of a Hasidic rabbi celebrating Hanukkah. He began stabbing the guests, leaving five wounded, two of which were hospitalized in critical condition. 72-year-old-man Josef Neuman, who was in a coma for 59 days, succumbed to his wounds in March 2020. The rabbi's son was also among the injured.
December 10, 2019	Shooting	7	3	Jersey City, New Jersey	Main articles: 2019 Jersey City shooting and Black Hebrew Israelites § Extremist fringe David Nathaniel Anderson (age 47) and his girlfriend Francine Graham (age 50) perpetrated a shooting at a kosher grocery store. Five people were killed, including the two assailants and three civilians whom they attacked. Additionally, the assailants wounded one civilian and two police officers. Anderson had made posts on social media that were anti-police and anti-Semitic. His language was linked to that used by the Black Hebrew Israelite movement.
September 19, 2019	Vandalism	0	0	Racine, Wisconsin and Hancock, Michigan	2019 synagogue vandalism: In a campaign the group dubbed "Operation Kristallnacht", members of the neo-Nazi accelerationist paramilitary group The Base vandalized the synagogues Beth Israel Sinai Congregation and Temple Jacob. Three members of The Base were arrested and subsequently found guilty of vandalism. On June 5, 2024, 24-year-old Nathan Weeden was sentenced to 26 months in prison and 3 months of supervised release for the incident.
April 27, 2019	Shooting	1	3	Poway, California	Poway synagogue shooting: John Earnest fired shots inside the synagogue, Chabad of Poway. One woman was killed and three others were injured, including the synagogue's rabbi. In an open letter posted on 8chan shortly before the shooting and signed with Earnest's name, the author blamed Jews for the "meticulously planned genocide of the European race", a white genocide conspiracy theory.
October 27, 2018	Shooting	11	7	Pittsburgh, Pennsylvania	Pittsburgh synagogue shooting: Robert Gregory Bowers killed eleven people and wounded six in a mass shooting at the Tree of Life – Or L'Simcha Congregation. It was the deadliest attack on a local Jewish community in the United States. Bowers had earlier posted anti-Semitic posted on Gab. towards the organization HIAS. Referring to Central American migrant caravans and immigrants, he wrote that "HIAS likes to bring invaders in that kill our people. I can't sit by and watch my people get slaughtered. Screw your optics, I'm going in."
August 11–12, 2017	Riot	3	49+	Charlottesville, Virginia	Main article: Unite the Right rally In a far-right rally, attendees were filmed chanting "[the] Jews will not replace us". The rally turned deadly when James Alex Fields Jr., one of the attendees, launched a vehicle-ramming attack on an opposing group.
April 13, 2014	Shooting	3	0	Overland Park, Kansas	2014 Overland Park shootings: 73-year-old Frazier Glenn Miller Jr., a Klansman and neo-Nazi, perpetrated shootings at the Jewish Community Center of Greater Kansas City and Village Shalom, a Jewish retirement community. A total of three people were killed in the shootings, two of whom were shot at the community center and one shot at the retirement community.
June 10, 2009	Shooting	1	1	Washington, D.C.	United States Holocaust Memorial Museum shooting: At about 12:50 p.m. on June 10, 2009, 88-year-old white supremacist James Wenneker von Brunn entered the United States Holocaust Memorial Museum with a rifle and fatally shot Museum Special Police Officer Stephen Tyrone Johns. Other security guards returned fire, wounding von Brunn, who was apprehended.
July 28, 2006	Shooting	1	6	Seattle, Washington	Seattle Jewish Federation shooting: at around 4:00 p.m. Naveed Afzal Haq entered the Jewish Federation of Greater Seattle building and shot six women, one fatally. Witnesses reported that before Haq began shooting he shouted, "I'm a Muslim American; I'm angry at Israel."
August 6, 2003	Stabbing	1	0	Houston, Texas	Murder of Ariel Sellouk: Mohammed Ali Alayed had stopped socializing with his Jewish friend Ariel Sellouk after becoming a religiously strict Muslim. After not seeing each other for more than a year, Alayed invited Sellouk to a bar for drinks, and from there invited Selouk to Alayed's apartment, where he slit Sellouk's throat and nearly decapitated him. Alayed pled guilty and was sentenced to 60 years in prison on April 19, 2004.
July 4, 2002	Shooting	3	5	Los Angeles, California	2002 Los Angeles International Airport shooting: Hesham Mohamed Hadayet, a 41-year-old Egyptian national, opened fire at the airline ticket counter of El Al, Israel's national airline, at Los Angeles International Airport. Two people were killed and four others were injured before the gunman was fatally shot by an El Al security guard. In September 2002, federal investigators concluded that Hadayet hoped to influence U.S. government policy in favor of the Palestinians, and that the incident was a terrorist act.
August 10, 1999	Shooting	1	5	Los Angeles, California	Los Angeles Jewish Community Center shooting: at around 10:50 a.m. white supremacist Buford O. Furrow, Jr. walked into the lobby of the North Valley Jewish Community Center in Granada Hills and opened fire with a semi-automatic weapon, firing 70 shots into the complex. The gunfire wounded five people: three children, a teenage counselor, and an office worker. Shortly thereafter, Furrow murdered a mail carrier, fled the state, and finally surrendered to authorities.
June 18, 1999	Firebombing	0	0	Sacramento, California	Sacramento synagogue firebombings: Brothers Benjamin Matthew Williams and James Tyler Williams firebombed three synagogues throughout Sacramento.
March 1, 1994	Shooting	1	3	New York, New York	1994 Brooklyn Bridge shooting: Rashid Baz shot at a van of 15 Chabad Orthodox Jewish students who were traveling on the Brooklyn Bridge in New York City, killing one and injuring three others. Baz was arrested and found to be in possession of anti-Jewish literature, a .380-caliber semiautomatic pistol, a stun gun, a bulletproof vest, and two 50-round ammunition magazines. Initially, Baz claimed a traffic dispute led him to commit the shootings, and the Federal Bureau of Investigation initially classified the case as road rage. Witnesses testified that on the day of the shooting Baz had attended "a raging anti-Semitic sermon" by Imam Reda Shata at the Islamic Society of Bay Ridge.
August 19–21, 1991	Riot	1		New York, New York	Crown Heights riot: a race riot that took place in the Crown Heights section of Brooklyn, New York City in which black residents turned against Orthodox Jewish Chabad residents. The riots began on August 19, 1991, after two children of Guyanese immigrants were accidentally struck by one of the cars in the motorcade of Rebbe Menachem Mendel Schneerson, the leader of Chabad, a Jewish religious movement. One child died and the second was severely injured. In the wake of the fatal accident, some black youths attacked several Jews on the street, seriously injuring several and fatally injuring Yankel Rosenbaum, an Orthodox Jewish student from Australia.
April 17, 1986	Murder	1	0	Pittsburgh, Pennsylvania	Neal Rosenblum: was shot and killed because of his Jewish appearance, wearing Haredi attire. The killer, who had a swastika tattoo at the time of his trial, was released from prison on October 23, 2017, after serving 15 years of the maximum 20.
June 18, 1984	Shooting	1	0	Denver, Colorado	Members of the white nationalist group The Order murdered Jewish talk radio host Alan Berg in a shooting.
October 8, 1977	Shooting	1	2	St. Louis, Missouri	Guests who attended a bar mitzvah were leaving Brith Sholom Kneseth Israel synagogue when white supremacist Joseph Paul Franklin began shooting at them, killing Gerald Gordon, and wounding Steven Goldman and William Ash.
November 11, 1957 and October 14, 1958	Bombing	0	0	Temple Beth-El, Nashville, Tennessee. Temple Emanuel, Gastonia, North Carolina. Temple Beth-El, Miami, Florida. Jewish Community Center, Nashville, Tennessee. Jewish Community Center, Jacksonville, Florida. Temple Beth-El, Birmingham, Alabama. The Temple, Atlanta, Georgia. Temple Anshei Emeth, Peoria, Illinois.	1950s synagogue bombings: Five bombings and three attempted bombings of synagogues, seven in the Southern United States and one in the Midwest United States. There were no deaths or injuries. Some of the bombings are unsolved to this day.
August 17, 1915	Lynching	1	0	Marietta, Georgia	Lynching of Leo Frank: Leo Frank was an American factory superintendent who was wrongly convicted in 1913 of the murder of a 13-year-old employee, Mary Phagan, in Atlanta, Georgia. (Note: "The modern historical consensus, as exemplified in the Dinnerstein book, is that ... Leo Frank was an innocent man convicted at an unfair trial.") (Note: "The consensus of historians is that the Frank case was a miscarriage of justice.") His trial, conviction, and appeals attracted national attention. A mob lynched him on August 17, 1915, in response to the commutation of his death sentence.
December 17, 1862	Order			Parts of Tennessee, Mississippi, and Kentucky	General Order No. 11 was an order issued by Union Major-General Ulysses S. Grant on December 17, 1862, during the Vicksburg Campaign, that took place during the American Civil War. The order expelled all Jews from Grant's military district, comprising areas of Tennessee, Mississippi, and Kentucky. Grant issued the order in an effort to reduce Union military corruption, and stop an illicit trade of Southern cotton, which Grant thought was being run "mostly by Jews and other unprincipled traders." At Holly Springs, Mississippi, Grant's Union Army supply depot, Jewish persons were rounded up and forced to leave the city by foot. On December 20, 1862, three days after Grant's order, Confederate Major General Earl Van Dorn's Confederate Army raided Holly Springs, that prevented many Jewish persons from potential expulsion. Although delayed by Van Dorn's raid, Grant's order was fully implemented at Paducah, Kentucky. Thirty Jewish families were expelled and roughly treated from the city. Jewish community leaders protested, and there was an outcry by members of Congress and the press; President Abraham Lincoln countermanded the General Order on January 4, 1863. Grant claimed during his 1868 Presidential campaign that he had issued the order without prejudice against Jews as a way to address a problem that "certain Jews had caused".

== See also ==
- Antisemitic incidents during the Gaza War (2008–2009)
- Antisemitic tropes
- Antisemitism by country#United States
- Antisemitism during the Gaza war#United States
- Antisemitism during the 2026 Iran war
- Antisemitism in the United States
- History of antisemitism#United States
- History of antisemitism in the United States
- List of attacks on Jewish institutions
- Lynching of American Jews
- Racism in the United States#Jewish Americans
- Religious discrimination in the United States#Antisemitism
- Stereotypes of Jews
- Universities and antisemitism
