= Islamophobia during the Gaza war =

In the aftermath of the Hamas-led attack on southern Israel on 7 October 2023, an uptick in Islamophobic comments and sentiment has been observed, in both Israel itself and countries all over the world.

== Israel ==
On 9 October, Israeli Defense Minister Yoav Gallant referred to Hamas militants in the Gaza Strip as "human animals", following their massacre of 1200 Israelis, sparking controversy.

Hundreds of far-right Israelis reportedly tried to break into Palestinian students' dormitories at the Netanya Academic College in Israel while chanting "Death to Arabs". Reports of the students instigating the mob's reactions were ruled out by police. Others facing suspensions from their educational instructions after being accused of "support for terrorism" due to social media posts expressing support for civilians in Gaza.

== Asia ==
=== India ===
On 1 November 2023, during a rally, Chief Minister of Uttar Pradesh Yogi Adityanath said, "The solution to the Taliban is Bajrangbali's mace. We are seeing how Israel is currently working to crush the Talibani mentality in Gaza. They are taking the correct measures to ensure their targets are finished." In India, the term "Taliban" is largely synonymous with Islamic extremism.

== Europe ==
=== France ===
In November 2023, the French Council of the Muslim Faith stated that it had received threats in the wake of the October 7 attacks. The council also claimed that 14 mosques had been vandalized.

=== United Kingdom ===
In the United Kingdom, Member of Parliament Zarah Sultana called for a ceasefire, to which Prime Minister Rishi Sunak told her to call Hamas and the Houthis to deescalate the situation. Sultana responded shortly after that, "This is an Islamophobic trope – as if by being Muslim, I am responsible for Hamas and the Houthis." In February 2024, hate crimes against Muslims in the UK had risen by 140 percent compared to the year prior. Tell MAMA reported that anti-Muslim hate incidents had risen by 335 percent since the start of the conflict. In March 2024, the UK government pledged $150m dollars for additional security for Muslim sites following a surge of anti-Muslim attacks.

=== Germany ===
On 30 April 2024, Human Rights Watch released a report which said that the government of Germany was "falling short in protecting Muslims and people perceived to be Muslims from racism amid rising incidents of hate and discrimination" and that the "absence of a working definition of anti-Muslim racism and a lack of official data on incidents and of investment in institutional support for victims are among the impediments to an effective response."

== North America ==
=== United States ===
On 11 October, a group of pro-Israeli activists were accused of assaulting three Palestinian- and Arab-American men in Brooklyn, New York. According to the NYPD, the assailants shouted anti-Muslim slurs during the attack.

On 14 October, an Illinois man stabbed a 6-year-old Muslim Palestinian-American boy, Wadea Al-Fayoume, and his mother, Hanaan Shahin. The boy died, and his mother was hospitalized. The attack was deemed a hate crime by law enforcement and was subsequently charged as such.

On 31 October, NBC News reported that "The Council on American-Islamic Relations (CAIR) said that it received 774 requests for help and reports of bias incidents from Muslims across the United States from Oct. 7 to Oct. 24, a 182% jump from any given 16-day stretch last year." On 9 November, CAIR reported that it had received 1,283 complaints in the months time between 7 October and 7 November. On 16 February, CAIR reported that it had received 3,578 hate crime complaints in the last three months of 2023.

On 1 November 2023, the Biden Administration said it was trying to combat the increase in Islamophobia. In March 2024, the U.S. president condemned "the ugly resurgence of Islamophobia in the wake of the devastating war in Gaza".

The South Florida Muslim Federation stated the Marriott Coral Springs Hotel and Convention Center in Fort Lauderdale had abruptly cancelled their conference after receiving 100 calls baselessly claiming the organization supported anti-Semitism and terrorism.

Stuart Seldowitz, a former-Obama Administration official, was arrested and criminally charged for harassing a halal food vendor in New York City, but the charges were dropped after a judge instead offered him a 26-week anti-bias programme.

In September 2024, U.S. Senator John Neely Kennedy of Louisiana accused Maya Berry, the executive director of the Arab American Institute, of supporting Hamas, Hezbollah, and Iran, leading Berry to state, "I didn’t expect a direct racist attack". The same month, a cartoon in the Detroit News depicted Rashida Tlaib with an exploding pager following the 2024 Lebanon pager explosions. In response, Tlaib stated, "This racism will incite more hate + violence against our Arab & Muslim communities". The Council on American–Islamic Relations called on the U.S. Special Envoy to Monitor and Combat Antisemitism Ambassador Deborah Lipstadt to be fired after she joked "Do you want a beeper?" when asked about perceptions that Israel was weaker after the 7 October attacks. Ryan Girdusky, a conservative commentator, was banned from CNN after telling Mehdi Hasan "I hope your beeper doesn’t go off" after Hasan stated he supported Palestinians.

In October 2024, Ahmed Ghanim, an Arab American Democratic politician, stated that he was forcibly removed from a Kamala Harris rally in Michigan, stating, "They keep saying they want the Muslims and the Arabs, but we aren’t even welcome at an event".

In October 2024, a 23-year-old woman was indicted for second-degree assault as a hate crime, third-degree assault as a hate crime, and second-degree aggravated harassment for a unprovoked attack with pepper spray on a Muslim Uber driver on the Upper East Side in New York City.

On 22 May 2025, the Nueces Mosque in Austin, Texas was vandalised when an unknown person spray-painted symbols of the Star of David around the building.

=== Canada ===
On 28 January 2024, assailants threw rocks at a mosque in Mississauga, Ontario, leading Canadian Prime Minister Justin Trudeau to call the acts "cowardly, disturbing, and unacceptable". In February 2024, Trudeau condemned vandalism at the Islamic Centre of Cambridge in Ontario.

== Oceania ==
=== Australia ===
Between October and December 2023, Australia experienced a surge in both Islamophobia and anti-Semitism following the outbreak of hostilities between Israel and Hamas on 7 October. The Islamophobia Register Australia recorded 133 Islamophobic incidents between 7 October and 6 November 2023, including spitting attacks, threats to mosques and Muslim schools, graffiti, property damage, hate mail, verbal abuse, and online abuse. By comparison, the average number of weekly Islamophobic incidents prior to 7 October averaged 2.5 per week. Executive director of Islamophobia Register Australia, Sharara Attai, said that she believed that the number of Islamophobic incidents was higher than 133 and that Islamophobia and other hate crimes were often under-reported. In addition, the Victorian Police recorded 12 Islamophobic incidents between 7 October and 9 November, resulting in one arrest.

By 2 December, the number of Islamophobic incidents recorded by the Islamophobia Register had risen by 13-fold to 230 incidents over a period of seven weeks. Notable incidents included a young Christian boy being called a "terrorist" for his Palestinian ethnicity, Muslim women having their hijabs yanked off, and Arab and Muslim Australians being doxed, receiving death threats, and dismissed from their jobs for expressing pro-Palestinian viewpoints or attending pro-Palestine rallies.

Aftab Malik, the Special Envoy to Combat Islamophobia appointed by the Albanese government in September 2024, released his report on a national framework to combat Islamophobia in mid-September 2025. Malik's report made 54 recommendations including reviewing anti-discrimination laws, including the Racial Discrimination Act 1975, improving data collection on hate crimes, developing behavioural codes of conduct for Members of Parliament and parliamentary staff, and introducing compulsory Islamophobia courses for MPs and parliamentary staff. The Albanese government appointed an anti-Semitism envoy as well, due to an escalation of both anti-Muslim and anti-Semitic incidents following the outbreak of the Gaza war.

=== New Zealand ===
In mid November 2023, New Zealand's Department of Internal Affairs (DIA) and The Disinformation Project reported a surge in both Islamophobia and anti-Semitism in New Zealand following the 2023 Israel-Hamas war. Islamophobic content surfaced on both social media and gaming platforms. According to Disinformation Project researcher Kate Hannah, Muslims and Palestinians were often conflated with Hamas. Similarly, the DIA's digital violence research team also reported a surge in online content referencing the 2019 Christchurch mosque shootings. The Federation of Islamic Associations of New Zealand (FIANZ) chairperson Abdur Razzaq also reported a surge in online content calling for attacks on mosques following 7 October.

In mid November 2025, Stuff reported that Islamophobic offences had increased since 7 October 2023, citing Official Information Act figures. Anti-Muslim offenses rose from 131 between October 2021 and September 2022 to 157 offenses between October 2024 and September 2025. Tayabba Khan, founder of the Khadija Leadership Network, said this was part of a global trend. New Zealand Police superintendent Scott Gemmell said that Police were aware of a spike in both antisemitic and anti-Muslim offences since 7 October.

== See also ==
- Violent incidents in reaction to the Gaza war
- Anti-Palestinian racism during the Gaza war
- Antisemitism during the Gaza war
