= Anti-Palestinian racism during the Gaza war =

Following the October 7 attacks, and the outbreak of the Gaza war, there has been a surge of anti-Palestinian racism, anti-Arab racism, and Islamophobia. Palestinians have expressed concerns over increased anti-Palestinian racism in mass media and anti-Palestinian hate crimes. Human rights groups have noted an increase in anti-Palestinian hate speech and incitement to violence against Palestinians.

== Africa ==
=== South Africa ===
In June 2024, a 44-year-old man named Grayson Beare, who described himself as a former Zionist, murdered a 46-year-old woman named Halima Hoosen-Preston and critically injured her husband and her 14-year-old in Durban, South Africa. According to police, the victim's 10-year-old daughter stated at the scene that the suspect said he attacked the family due to their support for Palestine. The assault "allegedly occurred after an altercation Beare had with Hoosen-Preston during which she laughed upon hearing that his cousins had been killed in Israel." However, Beare's family stated that his act was purely criminal. Beare was later admitted to a psychiatric hospital for a mental evaluation.

== Asia ==
=== Bahrain ===
In October 2023, a doctor of Indian descent in Bahrain was fired from the Royal Bahrain Hospital for anti-Palestinian tweets that were deemed "offensive to our society" by the hospital.

=== India ===
A large amount of anti-Palestinian, Islamophobic, pro-Israeli propaganda and disinformation has emerged from India during the war, especially among Hindu nationalists. Anti-Palestinian disinformation from India often comes from supporters of Indian Prime Minister Narendra Modi.

== Europe ==
=== Belgium ===
On 11 December 2023, The Brussels Times reported that Belgium's Foreigners' Office had instructed municipalities to remove citizenship from Belgian children with Palestinian parents, though a spokesperson for the Secretary of State for Asylum and Migration denied this action was related to the ongoing war.

=== France ===
The interior minister of France ordered local authorities to ban all pro-Palestinian protests. French journalist Alain Gresh has said that Emmanuel Macron's Renaissance party has a "very strong anti-Palestinian position".

On 14 October 2023, French-Algerian journalist Taha Bouhafs was arrested while covering a pro-Palestine protest in Paris. He told +972 Magazine that people were getting "strangled by the police", and that the police fined him for participating in an "illegal demonstration" despite showing his press card. He also claimed that the police threatened to break his legs if they saw him again at a protest.

=== Germany ===
Palestinians in Germany described facing repression from authorities when they attempted to protest in support of Palestine, being subject to crackdowns, arrests and possible racial profiling. On 18 October 2023, a video of German police stomping out a candlelight vigil for dead Palestinians was seen circulating on social media. Pro-Palestinian protesters in Neukölln were faced with displays of excessive force, including the use of pepper spray and water cannons. Hanno Hauenstein of The Nation described "a climate of fear" in the country created by the Israel–Hamas war, exacerbated by "hard-line" actions from the government. One Palestinian human rights advocate called Germany's response to these protests as "McCarthyism in the purest sense", and a protester told Al Jazeera English that she was unsure "whether we actually have freedom of speech in Germany [regarding Palestine]". The Berlin senate administration has granted schools in the capital the power to ban a number of Palestinian symbols, such as the Palestinian flag and the keffiyeh.

In response to these restrictions, human rights organizations urged authorities to ensure and enable the right of all individuals to express their opinions and peacefully assemble. Germany also faced criticism from Muslim countries such as Indonesia, who argued that they were preventing peaceful protesters from publicly showing support for Palestinians.

On 10 October 2023, a teacher hit a student in Berlin for waving the Palestinian flag.

On 13 October 2023, LitProm abruptly cancelled a LiBeraturpreis for Palestinian author Adania Shibli for her book Minor Detail, a novel partly based on the true story of a rape and murder of a Palestinian girl in 1949 by Israeli soldiers; it was originally set to be given at the Frankfurt Book Fair on 20 October. Following this, more than 1,000 authors and publishers – including Colm Tóibín, Hisham Matar, Kamila Shamsie and William Dalrymple, as well as Nobel prize winners Abdulrazak Gurnah, Annie Ernaux and Olga Tokarczuk – signed an open letter criticizing this decision, saying that the Book Fair had "a responsibility to be creating spaces for Palestinian writers to share their thoughts, feelings, reflections on literature through these terrible, cruel times, not shutting them down".

On 13 November 2023, an Afrofuturism exhibition by curator Anaïs Duplan was suspended by Museum Folkwang after they expressed support for Palestine and "personally tak[ing] sides with the BDS campaign" on Instagram. The next day, Indian poet Ranjit Hoskote resigned from his position at the curator-finding committee of Documenta, after the exhibition publicly criticized him for signing a BDS India letter in 2019, calling it "explicitly anti-Semitic". The letter in question had denounced a "Zionism and Hindutva" event hosted by the Israeli consulate in Mumbai and co-organized by the Indo-Israel Friendship Association; the letter also called Israel an "apartheid state" engaging in "settler colonialism". Over the following two days, the entire committee resigned, citing the social climate created by the Israel–Hamas war in an open letter, and Documenta's "unchallenged media and public discrediting" of Hoskote in particular.

Masha Gessen (a Jewish, Russian-American journalist who lost family members in the Holocaust) wrote an essay on 9 December 2023, arguing that Germany's remembrance culture regarding the Holocaust was being used as a "cynically wielded political instrument" by the AfD to target Muslim immigrants. Gessen condemned the atrocities committed by Hamas on 7 October, but was also critical of the Israeli bombings of the Gaza Strip, which they considered to be highly destructive and comparable to an Eastern European ghetto "being liquidated" by the Nazis. Following this, the Heinrich Böll Foundation announced that they were withdrawing their support for Gessen winning the Hannah Arendt Prize, rejecting the comparison of Gaza to a Jewish ghetto as "unacceptable".

In February 2024, Palestinian Basel Adra and Israelian Yuval Abraham were awarded at the best documentary prize 74th Berlin International Film Festival for their documentary No Other Land. In their acceptance speeches, Adra called for an end of German arms export to Israel, while Abraham criticized a “situation of apartheid” leading to different rights for the two film makers. Abraham also called for a ceasefire in Gaza as well as a "political solution" for the end of the Israeli occupation. Several other film makers also expressed solidarity with the Palestinian cause at this event. The October 7 attacks were mentioned once in an opening statement by the Berlinale co-director. Multiple German politicians sharply criticized the statements at the gala as antisemitic or anti-Israelian, with Greens politician Claudia Roth calling them "shockingly one-sided and characterised by deep hatred of Israel", despite visibly clapping in footage of Adra and Abrahams speeches.

The Neukölln district council of Berlin passed a motion advocating for the use of brochures in high schools that dismissed the historical realities of the Nakba as "myth".

Nancy Fraser, a Jewish American philosopher, was appointed visiting professor at the Albertus-Magnus-Chair of the University of Cologne to deliver lectures about "Three Faces of Capitalist Labor: Uncovering the Hidden Ties among Gender, Race, and Class" in May 2024. But on 10 April 2024, the university abruptly disinvited her for signing the solidarity letter "Philosophy for Palestine". Fraser called the decision to disinvite her "philosemitic McCarthyism".

A Palestine Congress conference, scheduled on the weekend of 13–14 April 2024 at Berlin and organized by various Palestinian support groups along with the Germany Branch of European Jews for a Just Peace was prohibited. Ghassan Abu Sittah, incumbent Rector of the University of Glasgow, and Yanis Varoufakis, former finance minister of Greece, were denied entry into Germany and banned from speaking at the conference. Varoufakis commented on this: "It is clear that Germany's Staatsräson is not about protecting Jews. It is about protecting the right of Israel to commit any war crime of its choice." The International Centre of Justice for Palestinians challenged and succeeded in overturning the ban imposed by German authorities on Abu Sittah.

On 23 August 2024, in his report "Global threats to freedom of expression arising from the conflict in Gaza" (A/79/319), the United Nations Special Rapporteur on the promotion and protection of the right to freedom of opinion and expression expressed concerns over scope and gravity against protests in Germany:

In Germany, the response was among the toughest, imposing a blanket ban on all demonstrations in support of Palestinian people from 7 to 21 October 2023, and pre-emptively banning several such gatherings.

On 29 November 2024, a conference scheduled in Berlin with French historian Vincent Lemire, specialized in the history of Jerusalem, was cancelled. Lemire had come to present the German version of his comic strip "History of Jerusalem" in the Urania center together with his publisher Edmund Jacobi and literary scholar Christian Wolin. Reproaching Lemire for a tweet which criticized the French government for announcing to ignore the ICC arrest warrants for Benjamin Netanyahu, former German deputy Volker Beck refused to discuss with the historian. The Urania center canceled the event at short notice, announcing later that "a controversial debate" would not be possible without Beck.

Following pressure from politicians, public lectures by United Nations Special Rapporteur on the occupied Palestinian territories Francesca Albanese and Israeli architect Eyal Weizman planned at LMU Munich on 12 February 2025 and Free University of Berlin on 19 February 2025 were cancelled. Eventually, the Berlin event, organized by DiEM25 and the German branch of European Jews for a Just Peace was carried out in the premises of the Junge Welt newspaper despite deployment of riot police in front of and within the event.

In early 2025, several German scientists organizations signed a communiqué demanding that the "universities resist pressure from biased press coverage and politicians and defend university autonomy as well as the freedom of opinion and academic freedom of their staff and students".

In early 2025, Kamal Aljafari, a Palestinian filmmaker and visual artist, relocated from Germany, where he had been living and working in for decades and quitting Berlin for Paris, due to tightening restrictions around Palestinian discourse in the country.

On 6 April 2025, Israeli-German philosopher Omri Boehm, the grandson of a Holocaust survivor, was to deliver a speech on the 80th anniversary of the liberation of the Buchenwald concentration camp. But his participation was cancelled due to pressure from the Israeli Embassy in Germany. What Boehm wanted to say in his speech is, that the phrase never again is associated to the Lessons of the Holocaust and to all genocides as well. In this view, Boehm argues, never again applies to the "Hamas attack on Israel on 7 October 2023" and "the destruction and starvation in Gaza" as well.

Melanie Schweizer, a German lawyer, stood for election to the Bundestag with the MERA25 party in early 2025 in a Berlin constituency. Having been smeared by the tabloid BILD in December 2024 due to her solidarity with Palestine, she was dismissed from her post in the Federal Ministry of Labour and Social Affairs.

On 6 June 2025, Michael O'Flaherty, the Council of Europe Commissioner for Human Rights, in a letter to the German Federal Minister of the Interior, Alexander Dobrindt, expressed serious concerns regarding the conduct of German authorities in response to Gaza protests. O'Flaherty stated that

Since February 2025, Berlin authorities have imposed restrictions on the use of the Arabic language and cultural symbols during protests. In certain instances, such as the demonstration held on 15 May 2025 [in Berlin] to mark the anniversary of the Nakba, marches were limited to static gatherings. Additionally, protestors have reportedly been subjected to intrusive surveillance—both online and in person—and arbitrary police checks.

— Council of Europe Commissioner for Human Rights, Letter to the German Federal Minister of the Interior

On 3 July 2025, the University of Bremen cancelled a lecture of the Jewish psychoanalyst Iris Hefets about "Silence and Guilt - Psychological Mechanisms in Dealing with the Genocide in Gaza". The university argued that the advocacy group Jewish Voices for a Just Peace, of which Hefets is a board member, is designated as an extremist organisation by the Bundesamt für Verfassungsschutz. Critics described the cancelling as infringing on scientific freedom.

On 29 August 2025, an Irish activist was punched and left bloodied by a police officer at a Berlin protest against killing of Palestinian journalists in Israeli air strikes. Ireland's ambassador to Germany lodged a formal expression of concern to the German authorities.

In September 2025, German politician Uwe Becker called for a ban on the keffiyeh, arguing that it "must disappear from public spaces" because it "connects our streets with Palestinian terror" and represents "Israel hatred" and antisemitism.

On 18 November 2025, the Berlin branch of the French party La France Insoumise (LFI) planned to hold a Gaza-themed event at Die Linke's Berlin political party headquarters, including a talk by MEP Emma Fourreau. The event was cancelled by a Linke politician, citing alleged major changes in the content, as well as announced protests. LFI officials criticized the cancelling as a silencing of pro-Palestinian voices.

=== United Kingdom ===
Since the war, Islamophobic hate crimes increased by 140% in London. According to British journalists Peter Oborne and Imran Mulla, "Britain has experienced an epidemic of almost unchallenged anti-Palestinian racism and anti-Muslim bigotry" since the war began. Oborne and Mulla have accused Home Secretary Suella Braverman for being "inexcusably silent" on anti-Palestinianism and Islamophobia. Braverman stated on 11 October that some behaviours like waving Palestinian flags in public "are legitimate in some circumstances", but may not be so if they are "intended to glorify acts of terrorism" or are used aggressively in Jewish neighbourhoods or singled-out Jewish members of the public. She also described an Armistice Day 2023 protest against the war in Gaza, which was attended by 800,000 people in London, as a "hate march" and accused the Metropolitan Police of having a pro-Palestinian bias. According to a YouGov poll in November 2024, British support for the London marches stands at 33%, while those who oppose the marches account for 43%. The reverse is true of Londoners, where 45% support the marches and 36% do not.

In Manchester, the 2024 arts venue HOME cancelled an event called Voices of Resilience: A Celebration of Gazan Writing, citing security concerns after the Jewish Representative Council of Greater Manchester (JRGCM) wrote to the venue complaining that Palestinian Authority culture minister and participating author Atef Abu Saif was antisemitic and objecting to the event's use of the word "genocide". Abu Saif and publisher Comma Press, which had organized the event, denied the allegations and said they were libelous. A letter signed by 300 artists and arts professionals, including Phil Collins and Maxine Peake, wrote to HOME to request it allow the event to continue and "repair its commitment to anti-racism, including anti-Palestinian racism". After nearly 100 artists withdrew their work from HOME's exhibition space and a protest outside the venue, it reinstated the event.

In July 2024, over 750 artists signed an open letter by Artists for Palestine UK, after the Royal Academy of Arts removed a photograph of a Jewish protestor holding a placard in support of Palestine. The open letter said the Royal Academy had engaged in censorship which "colluded with the erasure of [the] Jewish contribution to solidarity with Palestinians". The Jewish Socialists' Group, which signed the letter, said the Royal Academy gave "support to a racist, anti-Palestinian campaign". In October 2024, over 270 artists signed an open letter by Artists for Palestine alleging the Royal Exchange Theatre had censored pro-Palestinian and pro-trans sentiments when it cancelled Stef O'Driscoll's production of A Midsummer Night's Dream.

== Middle East ==
=== Israel ===
Palestinian students attending the Netanya Academic College in central Israel were trapped in their dorms after a large Israeli crowd gathered in front of the building chanting "death to Arabs" and attempted to break into the building. The crowd accused them of disrupting an earlier Shabbat prayer service at a Chabad synagogue by playing loud Arabic music and hurling two eggs. The allegations had been reviewed and investigated by police who had ruled out the students' involvement. Middle East Eye reported that Palestinian students faced suspensions after receiving emails accusing them of "supporting terrorism" due to posts condemning the continued attacks of the Israeli military on Gazan citizens.

After October 27 2023, online commenters reacted to an anti-Palestinian racist and Islamophobic compilation video of Israeli influencers' contributions to a new TikTok trend, noting that Palestinians had been irrationally singled out using the Pallywood trope, an example of the ethnicity-based Islamophobia, and that it had a "revolting" nature, possibly due to "[the filmers'] kids [...] learning how to be racist from a very young age". Makeup was used both to perform the Pallywood trope and to exaggerate inherited attributes, purported and otherwise, as the ready-made explanation for the behavioral trait supposedly identified. The "users [were] applying black makeup to thicken their eyebrows and blacken their teeth".

In the weeks after the outbreak of the war in early October, thousands of Palestinians have been arrested and detained in Israel and the occupied West Bank. Many of those imprisoned alleged that they were tortured or otherwise mistreated while detained in military prison facilities, while the International Committee of the Red Cross stated they were repeatedly denied access to arrestees, who Israeli officials had classified as "enemy non-combatants". On 3 November, Israel reportedly deported 3,200 Palestinian workers into the Gaza Strip, with the UN Human Rights Office expressing their concern over the status of the deportees and indicated they were being sent into an incredible dangerous situation.

A video posted of young Israeli children drew outrage online after being posted on 19 November 2023, by the Israeli state broadcaster Kan News aired it under the title We'll annihilate everyone in Gaza. The video has since been deleted, but showed the children singing an old song written by Israeli poet Haim Gouri after the 1948 war, that had been amended to reference Gaza. While some debate has been raised about the translation of some of the words, some of the Google translated lyrics have been posted as, In another year there will be nothing left, And we will return safely to our home within a year, We will eliminate them all, And then return to plowing our Fields.

"Harbu Darbu" (Hebrew: חרבו דרבו) was released by musical duo Ness & Stilla on 14 November 2023. Ness (Nessya Levi) and Stilla (Dor Soroker) stated that they wrote the song to raise the Israeli people's morale, deciding it was "time to replace the sadness with anger". "The song celebrates soldiers of the Israel Defense Forces (IDF) and criticizes celebrities who voice anti-Israel sentiments. It also calls for revenge on everyone who planned, executed, and supported the Hamas-led attack in Israel. The rappers repeatedly use the phrase "every dog's day will come" in Arabic. This is directed at Hezbollah and Hamas leaders, along with Western celebrities such as Bella Hadid, Dua Lipa and others who have expressed support for Palestinian people and criticized Israel.

There have been ongoing protests in Israel against humanitarian aid being allowed to enter the Gaza Strip which continued after the decision in the South Africa v Israel International court case which indicated humanitarian aid should be allowed in. The protests began in December 2023 when activists attempted to block the Kerem Shalom crossing to prevent humanitarian aid from entering the Gaza Strip. The protests have continued with National Security minister Itamar Ben-Gvir called on Netanyahu to cease sending aid to Gaza in the end of January 2023 and in February 2024, Channel 12 reported that 132 aid trucks had been prevented from entering the Karem Abu Salem crossing.

According to Jonathan Ofir of MondoWeiss, between February and March 2024, mainstream Israeli television networks Channels 14 and 13 aired videos, which Ofir described as "snuff films", which show detained Palestinian prisoners being mistreated inside Israeli prisons. The videos are described as the actual interrogation sessions of prisoners, who are shown in the films were bound and blindfolded, while being made to kneel on the floor. A warden is recorded stating "They have no mattresses...They have nothing...we control them 100% — their food, their shackling, their sleep...[we] show them we are the masters of the house" Footage documented at least one area in where prisoners sleep with one room only having bare metal bunkbeds and a hole in the floor for a toilet.

During a meeting of the political-security cabinet in June 2024 during a discussion about the repatriation of the bodies of suspected and known Hamas militants from Israel, far-right Minister Bezalel Smotrich stated that the Israeli government should "place the bodies in a cart and drag them through the city center like they would do in the Bible so that they would see and be seen."

While speaking on Israeli Channel 12 news in June 2024, former far-right Israeli MK Moshe Feiglin quoted Adolf Hitler while speaking on the ongoing war. Feiglin stated that Israeli's "can't live in this land if one Islamo-Nazi remains in Gaza" and continued stating that Jews were "not guests in our own land, it is entirely ours" and that he wanted to "turn Gaza Hebrew". Feiglin has had a history of similar comments stating in 2019 that international law should not be applied to the situation as there is no Palestinian nation. In October 2024, Haaretz detailed how Israeli policies regarding Palestinians were supported by logics of anti-Palestinian racism.

In October 2026, an Israeli lecturer and professor from Bar-Ilan University was indicted after allegedly developing a plan under the name, "AIT", an acronym from the phrase, "the nation will carry out transfer" in Hebrew, with the goal to exterminate Palestinian citizens in Israel and the Israeli-occupied territories. According to prosecutors, the man planned to recruit 72 Jewish attackers, including himself, and divide them into 12 cells of six people and allegedly attempted to recruit Israeli politician Moshe Feiglin to help him find more participants.

=== Occupied Territories ===
Israeli settler violence in the West Bank escalated during the war. Shortly after the 7 October attacks, three Palestinian men in the central West Bank alleged that IDF soldiers and settlers had beaten, stripped, tied up and photographed for multiple hours, with one raising allegations that at least one individual sexually assaulted him. The United Nations have recorded 222 settler attacks in the West Bank against Palestinians since the 7 October Hamas attacks. At least six Palestinian communities have been fully abandoned due to the violence according to the West Bank Protection Consortium, which was founded by the European Union, and eight people have been killed and sixty-four injured. Settlers have also purposefully burned down ancestral olive trees, covered agricultural land with cement, attacked harvesters and built rock barriers to prevent people from returning to villages and fired upon them with live ammunition if they tried.

On 26 October 2023, a memorial in Jenin for Shireen Abu Akleh, a Palestinian-American journalist who was killed by an Israeli soldier in 2022, was bulldozed and destroyed by Israel Defense Forces. On 14 November, two monuments of PLO leader Yasser Arafat were demolished by the IDF in the West Bank's Tulkarem refugee camp.

In early November 2023, widely circulated video footage showed Palestinian detainees in reportedly the occupied West Bank being abused by IDF soldiers. Many of the detainees filmed are shown naked or shirtless with their hands tied behind their backs. At least one detainee is filmed being kicked in the stomach by troops and then spit on, while another is shown having his head stomped on by an IDF troop while laid on his back. In another case, a reported IDF member is recorded telling a detainee in Hebrew and Arabic "Good morning, whore. Good morning, whore. Spit on you, sheep fucker" before he spits on the detainee. The IDF later acknowledged some of the footage and that it was aware of some of the cases, with on going review by commanders.

Widely circulated video and images at around 7 December 2023, showed dozens of Palestinian men in Northern Gaza blindfolded, stripped partially naked, and kneeling on the ground, guarded by Israeli soldiers. Without a stated source, Israeli media reported that the images and footage showed a mass surrender of fighters. However, CNN reported that at least some of the men are civilians with no known affiliation with any armed group, with IDF spokesperson, Rear Admiral Daniel Hagari, appearing to confirm this by stating: "We arrest everyone" for interrogation. By 8 December Al Jazeera reported that some of the men shown had been released.

In mid-December 2023, multiple videos circulated online of IDF soldiers utilizing microphones and sound systems in mosques in Jenin in the occupied West Bank and in Gaza to sing traditional Jewish songs; some associated with Hanukkah that was ongoing at the time, mocking the call to prayer and reciting Jewish prayers. The IDF condemned the recorded actions, stating it was against the codes of conduct for the IDF and that any identified soldier seen were reportedly immediately removed from duty. Other videos have shown IDF troops since the start of the conflict, purposefully destroying businesses while laughing, setting goods on fire while still in a vehicle, and going through private Gazan citizens' belongings. These videos and actions were condemned by IDF officials as well.

On 15 January 2024, a group of 25 Palestinian students staged a sit-in protest against rising tuition fees at An-Najah National University, leading to Israeli police to arrest them and call them "student terrorist squads".

== North America ==
=== Canada ===
On 10 October 2023, a Tunisian woman was yelled at by another driver that she "should be raped and dragged in the street in front of her kids" for displaying a Palestinian flag on her car window. According to the victim, the other driver also rammed her car.

On 3 March 2024, a man was arrested in Vaughan on several charges including possession of weapons dangerous to the public, assault with a weapon and assault. He was identified as 27-year-old, Ilan-Reuben Abramov, and had stopped his car in front of protestors and began to shout at them, while carrying a nail gun that he reportedly discharged at protestors. In a viral video, Abramov is recorded stating "Every fucking Palestinian will die" before knocking the cell phone recording him from the hands of the protestor.

=== United States ===
According to advocates in the tri-state area, Palestinian Americans and Muslim Americans in New Jersey, New York, and Connecticut have experienced an increase in verbal and physical attacks since the war began. Council on American–Islamic Relations, a Muslim civil-rights organization, reported a 172 percent increase in anti-Palestinian and anti-Muslim incidents in the United States.

On 12 October 2023, a group of men were accused of waving Israeli flags while attacking three men in Brooklyn. The incident is being investigated as an anti-Palestinian hate crime. The incident happened several hours after a man waving a Palestinian flag was attacked in Williamsburg. Two days later, on 14 October, a six year old Palestinian-American boy named Wadea Al-Fayoume was murdered in Illinois. The boy's mother was also choked and stabbed. The attacker, the family's landlord, allegedly shouted "You Muslims must die" during the attack. The incident is being regarded by Illinois authorities as an anti-Palestinian and Islamophobic hate crime. That same day, a Jewish-American man in Farmington Hills, Michigan was arrested and charged with making a threat of terrorism after he posted on social media that he wanted to "go to Dearborn & hunt Palestinians". Dearborn is a city with large Arab and Muslim populations, and is where significant pro-Palestine protests were held in October 2023.

During a discussion in early November about a proposed cease-fire resolution in the Florida state house, Democratic state representative Angie Nixon asked, "We are at 10,000 dead Palestinians. How many will be enough?" In response, Republican Michelle Salzman responded "All of them". Salzman's comments were condemned by the Council on American–Islamic Relations in Florida (CAIR-Florida) who stated that they were a "chilling call for genocide" and had come about through "decades of dehumanization of the Palestinian people by advocates of Israeli apartheid." On 7 November at Edmonds Playground on DeKalb Avenue, a woman identified as 48-year-old Hadasa Bozakkaravani allegedly hurled hot coffee and anti-Islamic statements, calling him a terrorist, at 40-year-old Ashish Prashar who took his 18-month-old son to play. She has been charged with nine separate counts, four of them hate crimes. Bozakkaravani faces assault, reckless endangerment, aggravated harassment and assault on a person under the age of 11, all as hate crimes, according to police.

On 10 November 2023, the parents of a 13-year-old Palestinian student at the Corona del Mar High School in California reported that their son had been suspended due to "threatening remarks to another student", after telling the student who had reportedly been bullying him "Free Palestine", with a district spokesperson calling the remark hate speech. The CAIR-LA condemned the reported incident as a continued perpetuation of Islamophobia and anti-Palestinian sentiment. On 12 November, Kenneth Ballenegger, co-founder of San Francisco-based investment company Oyster Ventures, said on X that Israel must treat Gaza "like China handles Xinjiang", and advocated for a "Full surveillance state. Re education camps. Sterilizations." Ballenegger was later suspended after public backlash to these remarks, with Yashar Ali describing them as "disgusting genocidal rhetoric". Two videos depicting Stuart Seldowitz emerged showing him harassing a halal cart vendor on the Upper East Side, asking a series of racist and Islamophobic questions, including "Did you rape your daughter like Muhammad did?", "What do you think of that – people who use the Quran as a toilet?" and "If we killed 4,000 Palestinian kids, you know what? It was enough. It wasn't enough!" Seldowitz worked in the U.S. State Department's Office of Israel and Palestinian Affairs and then served as Acting Director of the National Security Council South Asia Directorate during the Obama administration. He was also the Foreign Affairs Chair at Gotham Government Relations, which ended all affiliation with him after the video emerged. The NYPD said it was aware of the videos and monitoring the situation. Seldowitz was taken into custody on 22 November, he faces one count of aggravated harassment of race or religion and four counts of stalking as a hate crime.

After actress Melissa Barrera shared multiple Instagram posts in support of Palestinians on 21 November 2023, it was announced shortly after that she had been dropped from the upcoming Scream 7 film due to the posts. A spokesperson for Spyglass Media Group, the production company for the franchise, issued a statement that their stance was "zero tolerance for antisemitism or the incitement of hate in any form, including false references to genocide, ethnic cleansing, Holocaust distortion or anything that flagrantly crosses the line into hate speech." Barrera had shared posts about the number of deceased Palestinian children as well as a Philadelphia protest calling for a cease fire, she has also shared links to donate to Doctors Without Borders and Save the Children, and had signed the Artists 4 Ceasefire open letter. About the same day United Talent Agency dropped actress Susan Sarandon as a client after she spoke out at a pro-Palestine rally, where she encouraged others to speak out in support of Palestine and said, "There are a lot of people afraid of being Jewish at this time, and [who] are getting a taste of what it feels like to be a Muslim in this country, so often subjected to violence."

On 25 November 2023, three Palestinian male students of Brown University, Haverford College, and Trinity College, wearing keffiyehs and speaking a mixture of English and Arabic were harassed and then shot while on their way to a family dinner in Burlington, Vermont. The next day, a 48-year-old male suspect was arrested in connection to the shooting near the scene of the attack.

On 14 December 2023, a 51-year-old teacher in Warner Robins, Georgia was charged with Felony Terroristic Threats and Acts and Misdemeanor Cruelty to Children. The man threatened to behead a seventh grade student who said she found the Israeli flag offensive "due to Israelis killing Palestinians."

On 4 February 2024, a 36-year-old man, named as Bert James Baker, was arrested after stabbing a 23-year-old Palestinian-American who was leaving a pro-Palestine protest he had attended with three friends at the Texas State Capitol in Austin. He was charged with aggravated assault with a deadly weapon and vehicle, and the attack was determined as "bias-motivated" by authorities.

On 31 March 2024, US House representative Tim Walberg of Michigan said that Gaza should be handled "like Nagasaki and Hiroshima" in reference to the atomic bombings in 1945.

On 9 June 2024, the University of Minnesota rescinded its offer to the Israeli-American historian of genocide Raz Segal after offering him the position of chair of the university's Center for Holocaust and Genocide Studies. Two of the center's board members resigned after Segal was selected over Segal's accusation that Israel was committing genocide in Gaza.

On 23 June 2024, a Jewish woman in Euless, Texas attempted to drown a 3 year old Muslim Palestinian child after making racist statements to the child's mother. She was out on a $25,000 bond for attempted capital murder and $15,000 for injury of the child. The representative for Euless, Salman Bhojani condemned the incident, saying "Hate has no place in Euless, District 92, or anywhere in our great state". President Joe Biden was "deeply disturbed", writing on X that "No child should ever be subjected to a violent attack, and my heart goes out to the family." She was later sentenced to five years in prison.

On 28 June 2024, in the first 2024 United States presidential debate, former President Donald Trump described Joe Biden as "a very bad Palestinian".

On 17 September 2024, the United States Senate held a hearing on rising racially motivated hate crimes in the United States, during which several Republican senators accused pro-Palestinian activists testifying of being antisemites in support of Hamas, Hezbollah, the Government of Iran, and/or UNRWA (the latter asserting unsubstantiated Israeli conspiracy theories that UNWRA is terrorist organization and participated in the October 7 attacks). Senator John Kennedy (R-LA) told Maya Berry, the executive director of the Arab American Institute and only Arab American testifying, "[she] should hide [her] head in a bag."

On 12 October 2024, The Weather Company withdrew an advertisement for The Weather Channel app featuring a woman wearing a traditional Palestinian keffiyeh and issued a public apology for it after the StopAntisemitism Twitter account falsely asserted that keffiyehs are anti-Semitic hate symbols and that the advertisement was offensive.

In November 2024, a 64-year-old woman from Downers Grove, Illinois, Alexandra Szustakiewicz, was arrested and charged with two felony hate crime counts and one count of disorderly conduct after being filmed verbally and physically attacking a Palestinian man, Wasseem Zahran, and his wife wearing a sweatshirt with Palestine inscribed on it. The man's wife recorded the attack as the women allegedly attempted to hit both of them, knock the cell phone from his wife's hands, and throw hot coffee on them, while allegedly stating "Fuck Palestine and fuck you."

In January 2025, the far-right Zionist group Betar tweeted that they would award $1800 to anyone who handed a pager to Nerdeen Kiswani, a reference to the 2024 Lebanon electronic device attacks that has been widely understood as a veiled death threat or incitement.

On February 15, 2025, a 27-year-old Jewish man, Mordechai Brafman, was arrested after he opened fire upon two Israeli tourists in Miami Beach, Florida, because he mistakenly thought they were Palestinians. According to the arrest report, Brafman made a statement in custody that he, "saw two Palestinians and shot and killed both." One of the victims posted on social media about the attack in which he stated: "Death to the Arabs".

In February 2025, Florida State Senator Randy Fine claimed in a series of tweets that there was no such thing as innocent Palestinian civilians, called them "demons that live on Earth" who "deserve death," and claimed that "Gaza must be destroyed." At a public hearing Fine chaired in March 2025, he was booed by attendees after he said "enjoy your terrorist rag" to a member of the public wearing a keffiyeh.

On April 24, 2025, a mob of Zionist Orthodox Jewish men and boys attacked pro-Palestinian protesters and chased and assaulted a woman mistakenly identified with them during a visit of Israeli far-right minister Itamar Ben-Gvir to the Chabad-Lubavitch World Headquarters in Crown Heights, Brooklyn. The mob made rape threats and chanted māwet lā-Arāvīm (Hebrew: מוות לערבים, 'Death to Arabs'). The woman had pulled up her scarf to obscure her face out of any photographs as she was passing through and was encircled by the men who began to shout at her, and threatened her. Videos posted to social media show some of the mob kicking her in the back, hurling traffic cones at her head, and pushing trash cans into her, while "This is America...We got Israel. We got an army now." could be heard in one clip.

==== Censorship of Palestinians ====
Human Rights Watch and Amnesty International have reported that the censorship of content posted by Palestinians and pro-Palestinian advocates on Meta Platforms has been systematic.

Since October 2023, different versions of Rabea Eghbariah's article Toward Nakba as a Legal Concept were the subjects of censorship controversies involving unprecedented editorial interventions. An initial short blog essay was commissioned, edited, fully prepared for publication, and ultimately spiked by the Harvard Law Review, and the directors of the Columbia Law Review shut down the entire website of the review in response to its publication.

In January 2024, Indiana University abruptly cancelled a career retrospective at the Eskenazi Museum of Art of Samia Halaby's work, planned years in advance.

== Oceania ==
=== Australia ===
In late November 2023, a Christian Palestinian Australian student at a Western Sydney primary school was called a "terrorist" due to his Palestinian ethnicity. The incident sparked a letter to Christian schools, urging prayers for all people harmed in the 2023 Israel-Hamas war whether Israelis or Palestinians. In early December, ABC News reported incidents of Arab and Muslim Australians being doxed, receiving death threats, and dismissed from their jobs for expressing pro-Palestinian viewpoints or attending pro-Palestine rallies.

In September 2025, two Palestinian Australian film makers, Shamikh and Majed Badra, were verbally assaulted on a train in Sydney by several men, telling to "take off your scarf", as well as yelling phrases such as, "If you want to fight for Palestine, go back there" and "Get the fuck out of here. We don’t want you in our country."

== Online ==
In July 2024, Palestinians living abroad stated that Microsoft had suspended their accounts after they used paid Skype subscriptions to call their families in the Gaza Strip.

== See also ==
- Antisemitism during the Gaza war
- Islamophobia during the Gaza war
- Violent incidents in reaction to the Gaza war
- Palestine exception
