= Attack on Joseph Borgen =

2021 antisemitic hate crime

On May 20, 2021, Joseph "Joey" Borgen, a 29-year old Jewish man, was assaulted and beaten in an antisemitic hate crime while heading to a pro-Israel rally in New York City. Borgen was wearing a yarmulke, a visible Jewish skullcap. Five pro-Palestinian activists were arrested and found guilty for the attack and received sentences of up to seven years in prison.

The attack took place during the 2021 Israel–Palestine crisis and drew national attention amid a rise of antisemitic assaults in the United States during the crisis. The attack drew widespread condemnation from American political leaders, including U.S. president Joe Biden and New York City mayor Bill de Blasio.

== Background ==
From May 10 to 21, 2021, there was a major outbreak of violence in the Israeli–Palestinian conflict, marked by Palestinian rocket attacks on Israel and Israeli airstrikes in Gaza. As the fighting intensified, synagogues were vandalized in Illinois, Arizona, California and Utah, and Holocaust museums were defaced in Florida and Alaska.

== Attack ==
On May 20, 2021, Upper East Side resident Joseph "Joey" Borgen, a 29-year old Jewish man, was on his way to meet friends at a pro-Israel rally in Times Square in New York City. He was wearing a yarmulke, a visible Jewish skullcap. Borgen got off the New York City Subway a few blocks from where a pro-Palestine rally was taking place.

Around 6:30pm, five individuals leaving a pro-Palestinian rally organized by Within Our Lifetime encountered Borgen on Broadway near West 49th Street in the Diamond District, which is closely associated with New York City's Jewish community. They chased him down the street, and Mohammed Said Othman threw him to the ground, when Othman began punching him. The group then pepper sprayed and kicked Borgen on the ground while shouting antisemitic slurs.

According to Borgen, he was followed from 48th street, then "I was surrounded by a crowd...making anti-Jewish comments." According to Borgen and an investigation by the New York Police Department (NYPD), the attackers called Borgen a "dirty Jew" and said "die Jew", and other antisemitic remarks. In addition, the attackers said "F--- Israel, we're going to kill you".

During the attack, Borgen was punched, kicked, pepper-sprayed, and beat with crutches, according to the NYPD. He was hospitalized at Bellevue Hospital with a concussion and bruising.

== Aftermath ==
ABC News reported the Anti-Defamation League described the attack against Borgen as part of a wider pattern of violence against American Jews during the 2021 Israel–Palestine crisis. During the 11-day crisis, antisemitic incidents in the U.S. increased 115% compared to the same time period in 2020, according to the Anti-Defamation League. The beating and subsequent prosecutions drew national attention. Borgen was one of several Jewish people attacked across the United States as violence flared during the crisis in the Middle East. Borgen was invited to the White House as part of a group hoping to call attention to rising extremism.

A Jewish security group attributed a deterrent effect to the prosecution of Borgen's attackers and effective controlling of protests by police as the reason for fewer antisemitic attacks during the Gaza war.

== Perpetrators ==
The court battles in the years following the attack led to criticism from activists that Manhattan District Attorney Alvin Bragg was too slow to prosecute the attacks and that his office was lenient on the attackers. Borgen's father Barry testified at an April 2023 hearing of the U.S. House of Representatives House Judiciary Committee about violent crime in Manhattan.

As of January 2024, Borgen was pursuing a civil case against the five assailants.

The Manhattan District Attorney's Office charged and ultimately received guilty verdicts for 6 men:

- Waseem Awawdeh. 23-year-old Awawdeh was arrested a few blocks away on the same day of the attack, still holding the crutch. He was initially released on bail. In custody, Awawdeh noted that "I would do it again." In January 2023, Bragg's office offered Awawdeh a plea deal of six months in jail and five years probation. Jewish groups and local officials such as Nassau County Executive Bruce Blakeman criticized the deal's leniency and called for its retraction. On April 26, 2023, Awawdeh pled guilty to second-degree attempted assault as a hate crime and fourth-degree criminal possession of a weapon. He was sentenced to 18 months in jail, including 12 months for the attempted assault charge, and six months for the criminal possession charge. In addition, Awawdeh was required to make a public apology.
- Faisal Elezzi. On April 24, 2023, Elezzi pled guilty to third-degree attempted assault as a hate crime. He was sentenced to 3 years of probation and was required to complete anti-bias programming and make a public apology.
- Mahmoud Musa. Musa, from Staten Island, pled guilty to one count of second-degree assault as a hate crime. On November 22, 2023, he was sentenced to 7 years in prison. Borgen dismissed Musa's apology as disingenuous, saying "If you're going to go attack me in the street because I'm wearing a yarmulke, shout antisemitic slurs at me, and then after the fact celebrate what you did, I don't think you're remorseful." In a statement after the sentencing, Bragg said, "Today Mahmoud Musa was held accountable for his role in repeatedly assaulting a Jewish man."
- Mohammed Othman. In October 2023, Othman pled guilty to second-degree assault as a hate crime. In December 2023, Othman was sentenced to five and a half years in prison and five years of post-release supervision for pepper spraying and assaulting Borgen.
- Mohammed Said Othman. In October 2023, Othman agreed to a plea deal of attempted gang assault. In January 2024, he was sentenced to 3 years in state prison for attempted gang assault and up to four years for assault as a hate crime, both felonies.
- Salem Seleiman. Seleiman was indicted and extradited from Florida to New York in June 2024. He pleaded guilty to assault in the second degree and assault in the third degree as a hate crime on September 29, 2025, and was sented to two years in New York state prison on December 4. According to the Manhattan DA, Seleiman kicked Borgen in the face during the attack and allegedly urged onlookers to leave.

Years later, Jewish advocacy groups pointed to the successful prosecution of Borgen's attackers as a deterrent to future hate crimes.

== Reactions and aftermath ==
The attack was condemned by local and national figures. Mayor of New York City Bill de Blasio said, "It's absolutely disgusting and unacceptable. We have had a man viciously beaten simply because he appeared to some individuals to be Jewish. We had folks throwing very potent fireworks and creating harm to others and burning some folk, at least one person. This is unacceptable." "What happened last night is absolutely unacceptable. There is no place for anti-Semitism in New York City. We will not tolerate it. My message is very clear. Anyone who commits such an act is going to be arrested and prosecuted." The day after the attack, De Blasio and other New York City leaders and police officials met with Jewish community leaders at New York City Hall.

New York governor Andrew Cuomo directed the New York State Police Hate Crimes Task Force to assist the NYPD with the investigation. The Anti-Defamation League also condemned the attack, saying "violence is absolutely unacceptable." In the wake of the surge of antisemitic violence, 51 Holocaust survivors who volunteered at the United States Holocaust Memorial Museum issued a statement. President Joe Biden acknowledged the antisemitism surge, vowing in a May 28 statement that the U.S. Department of Justice "will be deploying all of the tools at its disposal to combat hate crimes."

In 2025, Borgen made aliyah to Israel as part of a broader trend of American Jews seeking safety and community in Israel amid growing concerns about antisemitism.

== See also ==
- List of antisemitic incidents in the United States
- Killing of Paul Kessler
- Attack on Matt Greenman
