= 2023 Vermont shooting of Palestinian students =

Shooting of three Palestinian-American students

2023 shooting of Palestinian students in Burlington, Vermont
- Location: 44°29′15.45″N 73°13′53.34″W; Burlington, Vermont, United States
- Date: November 25, 2023; 6:25 p.m. ET
- Weapon: Ruger LCP .380 semiautomatic handgun
- Injuries: 3
- Perpetrator: Jason Eaton
- Charges: Attempted second-degree murder (3 counts)

On November 25, 2023, three 20-year-old students of Palestinian descent were shot and injured in Burlington, Vermont. The students, who were visiting Burlington for Thanksgiving break, were wearing keffiyehs to show solidarity with Palestine amid the Gaza war when they were shot near the University of Vermont. A suspect, 48-year-old Jason Eaton, was arrested two days later and charged with three counts of attempted second-degree murder. Although initially investigated as a possible hate crime, no official motive has been established and no hate crime charges were filed against him. Ahead of the trial, the judge allowed an insanity defense based on Eaton's claim that he was a CIA operative acting under orders. On September 21, 2026, Eaton was convicted in the shooting.

== Shooting ==
Three Palestinian 20-year-old male college students were returning to the home of one of their grandmothers after spending time bowling during a birthday party and were near the University of Vermont and the UVM Medical Center. They had been in Burlington since November 22, and were staying at the home of one of the student’s grandmothers. The students were reported to be speaking a mixture of Arabic and English and two of them were wearing keffiyehs when the suspect walked up to them and began to shoot at them, apparently only striking two of them when he was about 6 ft (1.8 m) away. One of the wounded was able to call 911, while the third fled to a neighbor’s home before realizing he had been shot, while asking for them to call 911.

== Victims ==
The victims were male Palestinian students at Brown University, Trinity College, and Haverford College. The three men grew up together and had all attended the Ramallah Friends School, a Quaker run kindergarten through 12th grade school, in the occupied West Bank. Two of the students were Palestinian-American US citizens, and the third was a permanent legal resident.

All three students were wounded, with one shot in the chest, another in the spine, and one through his backside. The mother of the most seriously injured victim told NPR that doctors had told the family it was unlikely her son would be able to use his legs again. In response to the news, the personal physician of King Abdullah II of Jordan reached out to the boy's family to identify his medical needs and send a specialist. In a statement, the young man said he was "one casualty in a much wider conflict." His family later confirmed that he was paralyzed from the chest down due to a bullet lodged in his spine.

In a statement following the shooting, the student who was permanently disabled said, "Had I been shot in the West Bank, where I grew up, the medical services that saved my life here would likely have been withheld by the Israeli Army. The soldier who shot me would go home and never be convicted."

== Perpetrator ==
A 48-year old white male suspect named Jason Eaton was arrested and charged with three counts of attempted murder in the second degree, with investigations into possible hate crime charges. When federal agents knocked on his door to arrest him, the suspect reportedly opened the door and told officials, "I've been waiting for you," and refused to say anything else. A subsequent search of Eaton's home revealed a pistol along with ammunition that was the same brand and caliber as shell casings found at the scene of the shooting.

== Legal ==
Eaton was arraigned via video link on November 27, pled not guilty and is being held without bail. He was charged with three felony counts and could face life in prison. Given the lack of evidence for his motive behind the crime, he was ultimately not charged with a hate crime for the shootings. On September 21, 2026, Eaton was convicted in the shooting.

== Reactions ==
U.S. Senator and former Burlington Mayor Bernie Sanders stated it was "deeply upsetting that three young Palestinians were shot here in Burlington, VT. Hate has no place here, or anywhere. I look forward to a full investigation". U.S. Attorney General Merrick Garland stated, "There is understandable fear in communities across the country". President Joe Biden condemned the attack. Vermont senator Peter Welch also condemned the attack. Vice-president Kamala Harris called the attack "senseless." Ambassador Husam Zomlot stated, "The hate crimes against Palestinians must stop." The Vermont state attorney for Chittenden County called it a "hateful act".

The American-Arab Anti-Discrimination Committee stated, "We have reason to believe that the shooting was motivated by the three [victims] being Arab." A group of Burlington-area rabbis spoke out about the shooting in a joint statement condemning the shooting and hope that the perpetrator was brought to justice, the group had also contacted the Islamic Center of Vermont to offer a message of support.

At a vigil for the students at Brown University on November 27, protestors demanded that the university divest from Israel, leading university president Christina Paxson to leave the podium while students chanted "Shame! Shame! Shame!" at her. A peaceful sit-in at University Hall took place on December 6, organized by the "Brown Divest Coalition." Forty-one students were arrested and charged with trespassing. More than 200 students protested about the arrests on December 11.

== See also ==
- Aftermath of the September 11 attacks
- Anti-Palestinian racism during the Gaza war
- Violent incidents in reaction to the Gaza war
- Islamophobia in the United States
- Murder of Wadea al-Fayoume
- Killing of Paul Kessler
- Mark Anthony Stroman
- Murder of Balbir Singh Sodhi
