= Attack on Matt Greenman =

2022 antisemitic hate crime

On April 20, 2022, Matt Greenman, a Jewish man, was assaulted and beaten in an antisemitic hate crime in New York City while counterprotesting a pro-Palestinian demonstration while wearing an Israeli flag as a cape. The demonstration was organized by pro-Palestinian group Within Our Lifetime. Saadah Masoud, one of the group's founders, pleaded guilty to the attack on Greenman and two other Jews and was sentenced to 18 months in prison in March 2023.

The attack occurred amid elevated antisemitism and extremist violence in New York and elsewhere in the aftermath of the 2022 Al-Aqsa clashes and was seen as part of a surge of hate crimes prosecutions by the U.S. Department of Justice.

== Background ==
According to the New York Times, the attack occurred amid a heightened focus by authorities on episodes of antisemitism and extremist violence in New York and elsewhere in the aftermath of the 2022 Al-Aqsa clashes.

== Attack ==
On April 20, 2022, Matt Greenman, a Jewish man, went to watch a pro-Palestinian demonstration organized by pro-Palestinian group Within Our Lifetime near 42nd Street and First Avenue in New York City. He was wearing an Israeli flag as a cape. According to Greenman, he was encircled, attacked from behind, and repeatedly kicked in the face while on the ground. Police investigators say Greenman was punched and dragged across the pavement.

According to police, Greenman had a swollen and bruised face and was taken to a hospital where he was diagnosed with a concussion. The attack was investigated by the New York Police Department Hate Crime Unit.

== Legal ==
Saadah Masoud, from Staten Island, was arrested for the attack in 2022. According to court papers, Masoud recognized the case detective and said to him: "All this for one Jew?" In June 2022, the U.S. Department of Justice charged Saadah Masoud with a federal hate crime for the attack, saying Masoud targeted Greenman because of "his perceived national origin, and actual and perceived religion." Masoud's was the first case to be charged by a newly created civil rights unit within the Southern District of New York's criminal division.

Prosecutors presented evidence from exchanges on a group chat dated to the day before the protest, where Mr. Masoud wrote: “VIOLENT!! ONLY VIOLENCE … IN PALESTINE THEY WISHHH THEY COULD SMACK A ZIONIST AND NOT GET TORTURED TO DEATH. WE CAN THO!!”

Masoud was one of three activists associated with pro-Palestinian group Within Our Lifetime to have been arrested or imprisoned for attacking Jews. Masoud was a founding member of the group. Masoud's attorney said he was "a fervent anti-Zionist".

On November 23, 2022, Masoud pleaded guilty to a federal hate crimes conspiracy charge. Masoud admitted in court that he "repeatedly punched" Greenman "because I perceived him to be an Israeli" due to Greenman wearing a Star of David necklace. According to court papers, Masoud had previously traveled to a pro-Israel rally in Manhattan in 2021, asked a man if he was Jewish, then punched him in the face. On March 2, 2023, Masoud was sentenced to 18 months in prison for the attack on Greenman and for two additional instances of attacking Jews in New York City.

== Reactions ==
In a statement, U.S. Attorney for the Southern District of New York Damian Williams said that "Saadah Masoud deliberately targeted three victims because of their religion and nation of origin. There is no place in this country for this offensive and hateful conduct."

According to the Washington Post, the case had geopolitical overtones due to the rise of antisemitic attacks in New York and other major U.S. cities. The case was part of a surge of federal hate-crime prosecutions this year under Attorney General Merrick Garland. According to the Biden administration, the increase in federal hate crime prosecutions was part of a White House effort to counter bias-fueled violence.

== See also ==
- List of antisemitic incidents in the United States
- Attack on Joseph Borgen
- Killing of Paul Kessler
