= Murder of Wadea al-Fayoume =

2023 stabbing of a child in Plainfield, Illinois

- al-Fayoume in an undated photo
- Location: Plainfield, Illinois, United States
- Date: October 14, 2023 c. 11:30 a.m. (CDT)
- Attack type: Child murder, stabbing, strangulation, hate crime
- Weapon: Military knife
- Deaths: Wadea al-Fayoume
- Injuries: Hanaan Shahin
- Perpetrator: Joseph Czuba
- Motive: Anti-Palestinianism; Islamophobia; Reaction to the Gaza War
- Verdict: Guilty on all counts
- Convictions: First degree murder; Attempted first degree murder; Aggravated battery with a deadly weapon; Hate crime (2 counts)
- Sentence: 53 years in prison

On October 14, 2023, Wadea al-Fayoume (Arabic: وديع الفيوم, romanized: Wadīʿa al-Fayyūm), a six-year-old Palestinian-American boy, was murdered by 71-year-old Joseph Czuba in Plainfield Township, Illinois, United States. His mother, Hanaan Shahin, was also stabbed and throttled, leaving her critically injured. The murder was a hate crime motivated by Islamophobia and anti-Palestinian racism in reaction to the contemporaneous Gaza war.

The murder led to several statements and condemnations from government officials and organizations. A fundraiser was organized to give Shahin safe housing, covering fees for the funeral and hospitalization, and establishing a charity in al-Fayoume's name. A vigil was held for him shortly after his death.

Czuba, who was Shahin's landlord, was arrested and charged with five counts. His trial was February 24–28, 2025. He was convicted of all charges, including murder and hate crimes. On May 2, 2025, he was sentenced to 53 years in prison. Czuba died in prison on July 24, 2025.

== Murder ==
According to the Will County Sheriff's Office, at around 11:30 a.m. on October 14, 2023, the landlord Joseph Czuba knocked on the door of 32-year-old Hanaan Shahin's home. Shahin told detectives that Czuba came to her door, angry with her about what was happening in Jerusalem. After Shahin answered the door, Czuba throttled her while yelling "You Muslims must die." After Shahin responded, "let's give peace a chance", Czuba attacked her with a military knife. Shahin scratched him, ran to the bathroom and called 9-1-1. When she came out, she found her six-year-old son Wadea al-Fayoume wounded with multiple stab wounds. Al-Fayoume and Shahin were transported to a hospital, where al-Fayoume was pronounced dead and Shahin was treated in critical condition. Law enforcement officers who arrived at the scene found Czuba sitting outside Shahin's home with a cut on his face.

== Perpetrator ==
Authorities said that the attack was motivated by anti-Muslim and anti-Palestinian extremism following the escalation of the Israeli–Palestinian conflict in October 2023. Czuba's wife said that her husband regularly listened to conservative talk radio and was very interested in current events. He was afraid that a "national day of jihad" would happen on October 13, and that his tenants would call Palestinian friends to come and harm him and his wife. He also withdrew $1,000 from his bank account in case "the grid" went down. In December 2023, it was reported that his wife had filed for divorce.

== Legal proceedings ==
=== Criminal charges ===
Prosecutors charged Czuba with first-degree murder, attempted first-degree murder, aggravated battery with a deadly weapon, and two counts of hate crimes. The United States Attorney General Merrick Garland and the United States Department of Justice opened a federal hate crime investigation into the attack on October 15. The FBI announced a separate hate crime investigation the following day.

Czuba's trial began on February 24, 2025 in Will County, with jury selection taking place; he was represented by public defender George D. Lenard. Prosecutors delivered their opening address and played a video recording of al Fayoumes mother Hanaan Shahin's 911 call on February 25. The court also heard testimony from Shahin. Czuba's defense attorneys argued that the prosecution's case was missing key pieces of evidence. The prosecution submitted crime scene evidence on February 26, which included photos of al-Fayoume's body bag, a black knife holder and police body camera footage. The court also heard testimony from Czuba's former wife Mary Connor, police officers, firefighters and medical workers including Plainfield firefighter and paramedic Brandon Vainowski and a physician's assistant with the pseudonym "Sally Smith." Czuba waived his right to testify on February 27, and both prosecution and defense rested their cases that same day.

On February 28, closing arguments were delivered, and after less than 90 minutes of deliberations, the jury convicted Czuba on all charges. On May 2, Czuba was sentenced to 53 years in prison, 30 years for first degree murder, 20 years for attempted first degree murder, and three years for the hate crimes.

=== Civil lawsuits ===
A wrongful death lawsuit was filed on November 21, 2023, by Al-Fayoume's father against Czuba, his wife and their management company, claiming they "were indifferent and failed to recognize a threat and prevent serious bodily harm". A hearing for the court case was set for March 11, 2024.

In June 2024, Shahin filed a similar wrongful death lawsuit against the same parties as well as the brother of Czuba, alleging that he worked in real estate and had introduced the rental opportunity to them despite being in a position where he ought to have known about Czuba's tendencies.

== Aftermath ==
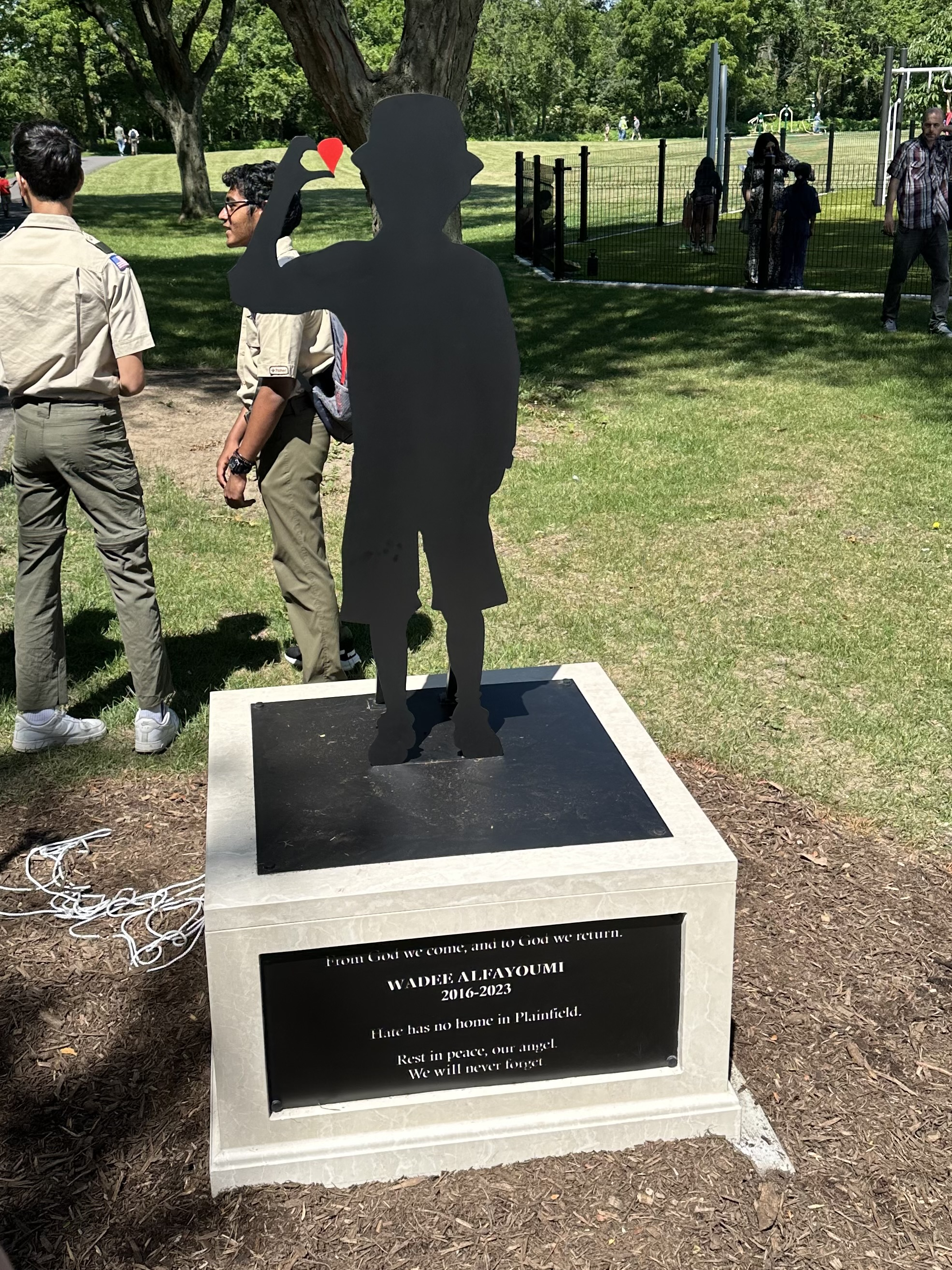
A memorial to al-Fayoume

A vigil for al-Fayoume was held shortly after his death at a local basketball court in Plainfield to mark his love for the sport. His father spoke to the crowd, calling his son an "All-American boy" who was always smiling and full of love, with other friends and family members speaking. The highest-ranking Muslim in the Biden administration, Dilawar Syed, also attended and spoke on behalf of the president.

A fundraiser was organized through LaunchGood to help cover funeral and medical expenses for al-Fayoume and his mother. A portion of the fundraiser would be sectioned off to provide safe and secure housing for Shahin, and another portion will be used to establish a charity in al-Fayoume's name.

Shahin spent weeks recovering from her stab wounds. The funeral for al-Fayoume drew a large crowd. Officials in Plainfield named a local park playground after al-Fayoume. A memorial was unveiled on June 28, 2025.

On July 24, 2025, Czuba died in prison at the age of 73. His cause of death has not been determined, but prior to his death, he had stage 4 cancer.

== Reactions ==
The attack prompted many public statements and condemnations, including from Illinois Governor J. B. Pritzker, U.S. Senators Tammy Duckworth and Dick Durbin, the Anti-Defamation League, and the Council on American–Islamic Relations. U.S. president Joe Biden also condemned the attack in a public statement, saying that he and First Lady Jill Biden felt "shocked and sickened" about the killing, adding that al-Fayoume's family "came to America seeking what we all seek—a refuge to live, learn, and pray in peace." The Roman Catholic Diocese of Joliet in Illinois, as well as the St. Mary Immaculate Parish of Plainfield, where the accused and his wife are parishioners, also made public statements condemning the event. Rabbi Rosen of Tzedek Chicago denounced the killing and expressed concern that the attack stemmed from the continued dehumanization of Palestinians and Muslims. Similar comments were echoed by a volunteer with Chicago's Jewish Voices for Peace who cautioned the continuation of anti-Semitism and Islamophobia.

The attack, along with increasing violent threats, have led many Palestinian Americans and other Muslims to cancel plans, made them monitor their speech and actions, and made them concerned about their safety and that of their family members. A similar concern was seen by Jewish Americans, and security has been increased around mosques and synagogues across the country.

== See also ==
- Aftermath of the September 11 attacks § Backlash and hate crimes
- Islamophobia in the United States
- Violent incidents in reaction to the Gaza war
- Anti-Palestinian racism during the Gaza war
- Killing of Paul Kessler
- Mark Anthony Stroman
- Murder of Balbir Singh Sodhi
- 2023 shooting of Palestinian students in Burlington, Vermont
