= Tenafly Public Schools =

School district in Bergen County, New Jersey, US

Address
- 500 Tenafly Road Tenafly, Bergen County, New Jersey, 07670; United States
- Coordinates: 40.929331°N 73.966016°W

District information
- Grades: Pre-K to 12
- Superintendent: Michael Ben-David
- Business administrator: Victor Anaya
- Schools: 6

Students and staff
- Enrollment: 3,465 (as of 2024–25)
- Faculty: 291.7 FTEs
- Student–teacher ratio: 11.9:1

Other information
- District Factor Group: I
- Website: www.tenaflyschools.org
Ind.	Per pupil	District spending	Rank (*)	K-12 average	%± vs. average
1A	Total Spending	$18,720	58	$18,891	−0.9%
1	Budgetary Cost	15,599	71	14,783	5.5%
2	Classroom Instruction	9,511	81	8,763	8.5%
6	Support Services	2,093	40	2,392	−12.5%
8	Administrative Cost	1,896	102	1,485	27.7%
10	Operations & Maintenance	1,740	60	1,783	−2.4%
13	Extracurricular Activities	349	89	268	30.2%
16	Median Teacher Salary	69,805	77	64,043
Data from NJDoE 2014 Taxpayers' Guide to Education Spending. *Of K-12 districts with more than 3,500 students. Lowest spending=1; Highest=103

The Tenafly Public Schools is a comprehensive community public school district that serves students in pre-kindergarten through twelfth grade from Tenafly, in Bergen County, in the U.S. state of New Jersey.

As of the 2024–25 school year, the district, comprised of six schools, had an enrollment of 3,465 students and 291.7 classroom teachers (on an FTE basis), for a student–teacher ratio of 11.9:1.

The district had been classified by the New Jersey Department of Education as being in District Factor Group "I", the second-highest of eight groupings. District Factor Groups organize districts statewide to allow comparison by common socioeconomic characteristics of the local districts. From lowest socioeconomic status to highest, the categories are A, B, CD, DE, FG, GH, I and J.

Students from Alpine attend Tenafly High School as part of a sending/receiving relationship.

== Awards and recognition ==
Tenafly High School was recognized with the Blue Ribbon School Award, awarded by the United States Department of Education at a special assembly to the Tenafly High School Community on September 20, 2005. Tenafly was the only high school in New Jersey and one of 38 public high schools in the U.S. to be recognized with the award that year.

The district's high school was the 17th-ranked public high school in New Jersey out of 339 schools statewide in New Jersey Monthly magazine's September 2014 cover story on the state's "Top Public High Schools", using a new ranking methodology, and had been ranked 3rd in the state of 328 schools in 2012. Tenafly High School was the 3rd-ranked public high school in New Jersey out of 322 schools statewide, in New Jersey Monthly magazine's September 2010 cover story on the state's "Top Public High Schools", after being ranked 3rd in 2008 out of 316 schools. The high school was the 2nd ranked public high school in the state out of 316 schools statewide, in New Jersey Monthly magazine's September 2006 cover story on the state's Top Public High Schools.

The Tenafly Middle School 8th grade string orchestra, conducted by Erika Boras Tesi, won first place in the American String Teachers Association's National Orchestra Festival in 2006, earning the title of number one public middle school orchestra in the United States.

== Schools ==
Schools in the district (with 2024–25 enrollment data from the National Center for Education Statistics) are:

- Malcolm S. Mackay Elementary School with 349 students in grades K–5
  - Heidi Chizzik, principal
- Ralph S. Maugham Elementary School with 358 students in grades K–5
  - Esther Loor, principal
- J. Spencer Smith Elementary School with 326 students in grades K–5
  - John Fabbo, principal
- Walter Stillman Elementary School with 315 students in grades K–5
  - Gayle Lander, principal

Middle school

- Tenafly Middle School with 916 students in grades 6–8
  - Patrick Comey, principal

High school

- Tenafly High School with 1,141 students in grades 9–12
  - James O. Morrison, principal

== Administration ==
Core members of the district's administration are:

- Michael Ben-David, superintendent of schools
- Stephen Frost, school business administrator and board secretary

== Board of education ==
The district's board of education is comprised of nine members who set policy and oversee the fiscal and educational operation of the district through its administration. As a Type II school district, the board's trustees are elected directly by voters to serve three-year terms of office on a staggered basis, with three seats up for election each year held (since 2012) as part of the November general election. The board appoints a superintendent to oversee the district's day-to-day operations and a business administrator to supervise the business functions of the district.

== Adolf Hitler assignment controversy ==
In April 2021, a fifth-grade teacher at Maugham Elementary School instructed her 5th grade students to do a presentation on famous people in the first person. After a recently immigrated Asian student asked to choose Anne Frank as a topic for her paper in order to learn more about her Jewish classmates, another student asked to choose Adolf Hitler as a topic. After consulting with her rabbi and considering the student's intent, the teacher decided to allow the student to proceed. The student dressed up as Hitler and presented an essay that she had written from the perspective of the Nazi leader touting his "accomplishments" as a part of a class assignment. The student wrote a biography of Hitler that glorified the Nazi leader, stated that Hitler's "greatest accomplishment was uniting a great mass of German and Austrian people" in his support, framed the Holocaust in a positive light, and added that Hitler was "pretty great". Subsequent to the presentation, the student reiterated her intention to the class and a substantive discussion ensued. The student's essay was displayed publicly within the school's hallway during the month of April. In May 2021, the details of the school assignment became known to the public, leading to outrage in the community, which has a substantial Jewish population. The subsequent social media maelstrom misconstrued the intentions of the student and teacher, resulting in harassment and the family's eventual departure from the district. After initially defending the teacher and the school's actions and asserting that "it is unfair to judge any student or teacher in this matter", the districts' board of education suspended the teacher and the principal of the school with pay in June 2021 and opened an investigation into the incident. Following the investigation, the teacher resigned and the principal was reinstated in July 2021.
