= Nerdeen Kiswani =

Palestinian-American activist and organizer (born 1993 or 1994)

- نردين كسواني
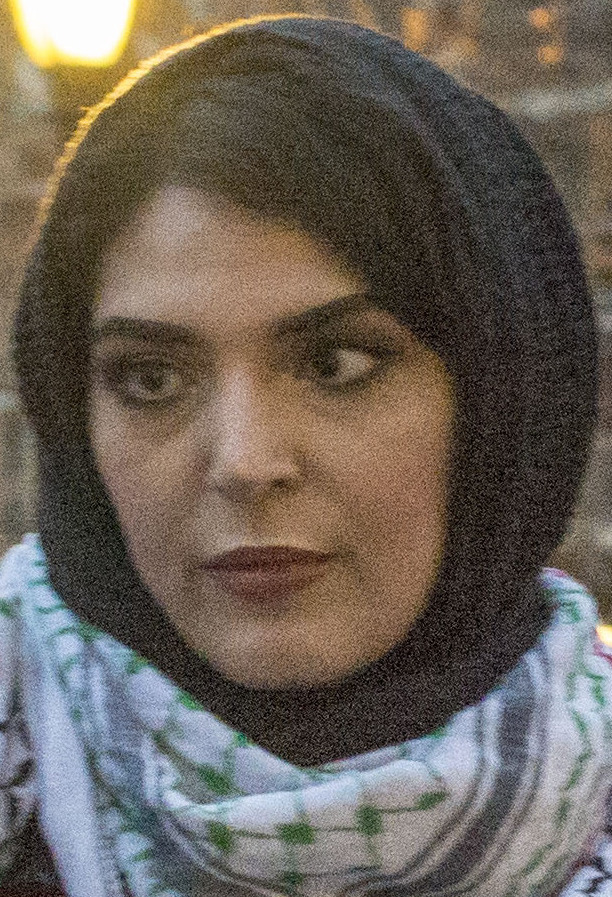
- Kiswani in December 2017
- Born: 1993 or 1994 (age 32–33); Jordan
- Education: City University of New York (BA, JD)
- Occupation: Pro-Palestine activist
- Organization: Within Our Lifetime

Nerdeen Kiswani (Arabic: نردين كسواني; born 1993 or 1994) is a Palestinian-American activist and organizer. She is a co-founder and chair of Within Our Lifetime, a pro-Palestine activist group in New York City. During the Gaza War, Kiswani has led or spoken at numerous protests in New York City, including the Columbia University student encampment and protests against the detention of Mahmoud Khalil. Considered an influential activist, she has been credited with inspiring Gaza War protests in the US, including student protests. As a student at the City University of New York (CUNY), she was also involved in pro-Palestine activism as president of the school's Students for Justice in Palestine chapter.

== Early life ==
Kiswani's family are refugees from the Palestinian town of Beit Iksa. Kiswani has recalled listening to her grandmother's stories about leaving Palestine on foot during the Nakba. Some of her family still lives in the West Bank. Kiswani was born in Jordan around 1994 but grew up in Bay Ridge, Brooklyn, which has a large Arab and Palestinian community. She studied at an Islamic school and then later at public school. According to Kiswani, she experienced Islamophobia in school, including being called a terrorist.

== Student activism at CUNY ==
=== Undergraduate ===
Kiswani studied human rights and international relations at City University of New York (CUNY), attending classes at both the College of Staten Island and Hunter College. In 2015, Kiswani co-founded NYC Students for Justice in Palestine (NYC SJP), which represented multiple CUNY schools. Due to her activism with NYC SJP, Israeli security forces prevented Kiswani from visiting her family in the West Bank in June 2015. She has credited her desire to return to Palestine as a motivation for her activism. Later that year, Kiswani and NYC SJP published an article which criticized pro-Palestinian activists for utilizing Boycott, Divestment and Sanctions (BDS) as their primary tactic and called BDS "a tool in a toolbox, not the toolbox itself". The BDS movement and the national SJP criticized the article.

At a protest against tuition increases in November 2015, Kiswani led students in chanting: "Zionists out of CUNY!" The slogan was cited in a letter to the CUNY administration from the Zionist Organization of America accusing SJP of antisemitism. According to Kiswani, the chant represented opposition to Zionism as an ideology and SJP did not condone banning any students from CUNY. In a subsequent investigation, CUNY found that SJP was not guilty of antisemitism, but Kiswani credited the investigation with undermining pro-Palestine activism at CUNY. Kiswani completed her undergraduate degree at CUNY in June 2016.

=== School of Law ===
As a student at CUNY School of Law, Kiswani was president of the SJP chapter. In conjunction with SJP and the Jewish Law Students Association, Kiswani successfully organized students to vote against a resolution supporting the IHRA definition of antisemitism. Kiswani also played a key role in organizing a BDS resolution, which was passed by the student government while she was its vice president. The resolution, which was later endorsed by the faculty, stated that CUNY was implicated in Israeli war crimes against Palestinians and urged CUNY to end all academic and financial ties with Israel. The chancellor of CUNY released a statement that opposed the resolution and cited anti-BDS rules in New York State. In response to the BDS resolutions, city councilwoman Inna Vernikov removed funding from a free CUNY legal clinic and criticized Kiswani in her announcement of the cuts. Additionally, Kiswani continued to organize protests and other activism through her group Within Our Lifetime.

Elected as graduation speaker by the class of 2022, Kiswani's speech criticized the US and Israel as well as CUNY's response to the Israeli-Palestinian conflict. An organization called SAFE CUNY criticized CUNY Law for allowing Kiswani's commencement speech, alleging that CUNY was unsafe for Jewish people. CUNY Law later removed the recording of Kiswani's speech from their website and stopped allowing the student body to elect commencement speakers.

==== Organized e-mail campaign ====
Kiswani has stated that she was subject to harassment and death threats due to her pro-Palestine activism since she enrolled at CUNY School of Law. She said that she received e-mails and phone calls from people who accused her of antisemitism. The CUNY Law administration received a very high volume of e-mails calling for her to be disciplined. The e-mails appeared to have largely been organized via Act.IL, a now defunct app that rewarded users for completing online tasks combatting what it considered antisemitism. Act.IL was created by former Israeli intelligence officers and, according to Mondoweiss, was partially funded by the Israeli government. Several organizations including Palestine Legal and the school's Jewish Law Students Association expressed their support for Kiswani. Ultimately, CUNY School of Law found that Kiswani had not violated any rules and released a statement in support of her free speech.

== Within Our Lifetime ==
In 2018, NYC Students for Justice in Palestine was renamed Within Our Lifetime (WOL). WOL organizes pro-Palestine marches, including an annual Nakba Day march in Bay Ridge, Brooklyn, and Gaza war protests that have shut down New York City traffic and transportation. The group's protest slogans include: "Globalize the intifada". Kiswani typically speaks at WOL protests and has been arrested multiple times. She has led numerous protests including demonstrations against the detention of Mahmoud Khalil. She also organized a protest at the 2023 Rockefeller Center Christmas Tree lighting in response to the cancellation of Christmas celebrations in Bethlehem, Palestine. Kiswani has been credited with influencing Gaza War protests in the US, including student protests.

Kiswani was arrested while protesting outside Columbia University in February 2024. The following month, Kiswani criticized the Israeli–Palestinian peace process and endorsed armed resistance against Israel at an event organized for Columbia University students. After her wedding in April, Kiswani visited the Columbia University student encampment in her wedding thobe to offer her support. She later spoke at the opening night for Hind’s House, an art exhibit commemorating the encampment. Columbia University has banned her from entering their campus.

At a June 2024 protest outside a Nova music festival massacre exhibit, Kiswani gave a speech in which she referred to Nova as "the place where Zionists decided to rave next to a concentration camp" and called the exhibit "Zionist propaganda to try and justify the mass murder of the Palestinian people." Additionally, she condemned the Nuseirat rescue and massacre which had taken place a week prior. The protest was criticized as antisemitic by government officials, including Representative Alexandria Ocasio-Cortez. In response to criticism of a WOL member for telling Zionists to leave a subway car, Kiswani tweeted that her group does not want Zionists "in Palestine, NYC, our schools, on the train, ANYWHERE."

Kiswani is part of a CAIR lawsuit against the NYPD for their conduct during Gaza war protests in October 2023. After the 2024 Nakba Day protests, Kiswani accused the New York City Police Department (NYPD) of police brutality, including assaults, property damage, and instigating conflict. After a June 2024 protest at the Brooklyn Museum, Hyperallergic and Democracy Now! reported that the NYPD tackled Kiswani and removed her hijab. Additionally, Kiswani criticized the NYPD's response to the 2025 pro-Israel mob attack in Brooklyn, stating that they contributed to it instead of stopping it.

=== 2026 bomb plot against Kiswani ===
On March 26, 2026, a suspected male Jewish extremist was arrested in Hoboken, New Jersey, by the Federal Bureau of Investigation and the New York City Police Department, after being accused of plotting a Molotov cocktail attack against Kiswani's Staten Island home. According to an official of the NYPD, the suspect is a member of a Jewish extremist group called the JDL 613 Brotherhood, a New Jersey-based group founded in 2024, inspired by the Jewish Defense League (a pro-Israel group designated by the FBI as a terrorist organization), with the goal of "fighting back against rising antisemitism" and describing its members as "Jewish warriors". A police department spokesperson stated that the suspect had discussed the plot in a group chat with an undercover NYPD detective in February 2026, and a criminal complaint further alleges that the suspect discussed a plan with the undercover officer to vandalize Kiswani's home and escape the US by the end of April. Mayor of New York City Zohran Mamdani stated that the suspect planned to flee to Israel following the attack. The suspect was later charged for making and possessing destructive devices, which each carry a maximum penalty of 10 years in prison.

== Political views ==
Kiswani and WOL are considered to be less moderate than other pro-Palestine activists. Kiswani believes in the Palestinian right of armed resistance, stating that it has always played a role in revolutionary movements. She uses the phrase "by any means necessary" as a reference to Malcolm X.

According to Kiswani, the two-state solution is not viable, and Israel and Palestine already function as a single state under Israeli control. In her view, all of the land in Israel and Palestine should be incorporated into a Palestinian state, and Palestinians should be able to exercise their right of return.

Kiswani has called electoral politics a "dead end". "We will not integrate into the same fascist empire we are fighting against. Even your '3rd party' candidates are just funneling our people back into the sham idea that the system works," Kiswani wrote. Kiswani has condemned Democratic politicians, including Joe Biden and Kamala Harris, due to their support for Israel. She has also condemned Donald Trump's February 2025 Gaza Strip proposal. Kiswani criticized progressive Representatives Jamaal Bowman and Alexandria Ocasio-Cortez after the two condemned a Within Our Lifetime protest where participants praised the October 7 attacks. Kiswani said that Ocasio-Cortez was "worse than any openly fascist politician. At least we know they are our enemies. Liberals like you will smile in our face as you lie to and back stab our communities." Kiswani supported a protest in June 2024 by Within Our Lifetime against Bowman during a rally for his reelection attended by Ocasio-Cortez and Bernie Sanders. Bowman, one of the most outspoken critics of the Gaza genocide in Congress, would subsequently lose his congressional primary to pro-Israel candidate George Latimer.

Kiswani criticized New York City mayor-elect Zohran Mamdani in 2025 after he responded to the vandalism of a yeshiva with a swastika by stating there was a "scourge of antisemitism" in the city. She argued that narratives of antisemitism were overemphasized to justify Zionism. Kiswani criticized praise for a video of Mamdani planting an olive tree with Palestinian families from Gaza. "Is this really how y'all are talking about a genocide? He's sending a classy message to the butcher of Gaza and that's acceptable?" Kiswani further criticized Mamdani for failing to meet his campaign promise of arresting Benjamin Netanyahu. Kiswani backed a Within Our Lifetime sponsored protest of Mamdani in 2026 while the mayor attended a vigil at Union Square for victims of the October 7 attacks on the event's third anniversary. Protesters accused Mamdani of betraying the pro-Palestinian movement and supporting the Gaza genocide. Kiswani said that Mamdani "issues so much condemnation when it comes to any slight, any perceived slight even, against folks in Jewish and Zionist communities" while he "barely says a whisper when it comes to things like this on Palestine anymore."

According to Algemeiner Journal, Kiswani believes that Ukraine is a "Western-backed project propped up for geopolitical interests & sustained by empire" and that Ukraine and Palestine "are not the same struggle."

== Reception ==
Kiswani is credited with playing a role in motivating Gaza war protests in the United States, including at university campuses. The New York Times and The Forward have referred to Kiswani as a "prominent activist", while NBC News has called her "emblematic" of the grassroots pro-Palestine movement in the US. Mondoweiss has called Kiswani's organizing "impressive" and "relentless". Sarah Schulman has stated that Kiswani's views are based on her experiences: "if this was me, and this was my family that was being brutalized and murdered, would I be doing this?"

The Instagram accounts for WOL and Kiswani were shut down in February 2024 because, according to Meta, they had violated its rules against promoting "dangerous organizations or individuals". WOL characterized the bans as censorship.

Pro-Israel organizations such as the Anti-Defamation League, Canary Mission, and StopAntisemitism have accused Kiswani of antisemitism. Kiswani has stated she is anti-Zionist, not antisemitic. According to Kiswani, accusations of antisemitism have been unfairly made against pro-Palestine activists.

In January 2025, the far-right Zionist group Betar tweeted that it would award $1800 to anyone who handed a pager to Kiswani—a reference to the 2024 Lebanon electronic device attacks that has been widely understood as a veiled death threat or incitement.
