= Congregation Beth Israel (Austin, Texas) =

Synagogue in Texas, United States

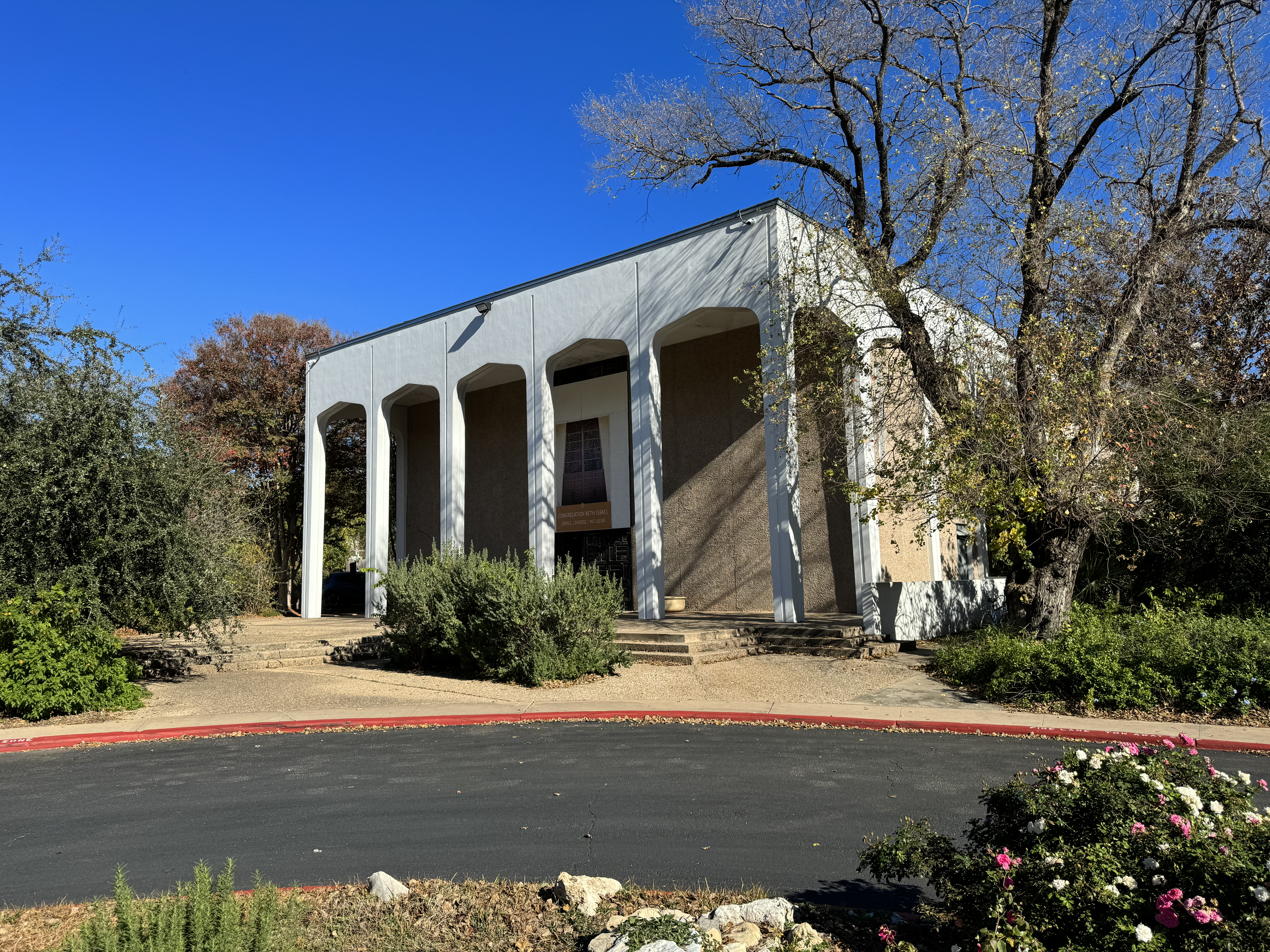
- Beth Israel synagogue in 2023

- Location in Texas

Religion
- Affiliation: Reform Judaism
- Ecclesiastical or organisational status: Synagogue
- Leadership: Rabbi Steven Folberg; Rabbi Kelly Levy (associate)
- Status: Active

Location
- Location: 3901 Shoal Creek Boulevard, Austin, Texas
- Country: United States
- Coordinates: 30°18′30″N 97°44′50″W

Architecture
- Founder: Henry Hirshfeld; Phineas de Cordova
- Established: 1876 (as a congregation)
- Completed: 1967
- Capacity: 650 worshippers

Website
- bethisrael.org

Congregation Beth Israel is a Reform Jewish synagogue located at 3901 Shoal Creek Boulevard in Austin, Texas, in the United States. Organized in 1876 and chartered by the state of Texas in 1879, it is the oldest synagogue in Austin.

== Overview ==
A synagogue was completed in 1884, near the intersection of 11th and San Jacinto Streets, and the first rabbi appointed in 1886. Following post-World War II population growth in the region, a new synagogue, located on Shoal Creek Boulevard, was completed in 1967, accommodating 650 worshippers.

The synagogue had 51 members in 1907 and was located at East 11th and Trinity. It had no rabbi at the time. Congregation Beth Israel served approximately 710 households as of 2021.

The senior rabbi is Steven Folberg.

== 2021 arson attack ==
In October 2021, the Goyim Defense League (GDL), a Neo-Nazi antisemitic group, organized a spate of antisemitic incidents in Austin. On 25 October, the GDL hung a banner from a bridge over the MoPac Expressway in Austin that read "Vax the Jews". Several days earlier, antisemitic graffiti had been found at Anderson High School.

On 31 October 2021, 18 year old Franklin Barrett Sechriest, a student at Texas State University a former member of the Texas National Guard, committed an arson attack at the synagogue, damaging its front doors and stained glass windows, causing more than $250,000 in damage. Ten days after the attack, authorities arrested Sechriest. He resigned from the national guard before conducting the arson. Stickers with Nazi propaganda and swastikas were recovered from Sechriest. According to security footage, Sechriest's vehicle was at the synagogue before the fire started, and he was seen carrying a container and toilet paper to the doors of the synagogue before being observed running away after the synagogue was ablaze.

Sechriest admitted that he conducted the attack at the synagogue because of his hatred for Jews. According to federal investigators, Sechriest wrote racist and antisemitic entries in his personal journal before committing the arson. Several days after the arson, he wrote, "I set a synagogue on fire." They also found bomb-making supplies in his car.

On 10 April 2023, Sechriest pled guilty in the Western District of Texas to two federal charges, including the destruction of religious property, which is a hate crime. As part of the plea deal, prosecutors dropped a third charge of the use of a fire to commit a felony. Prosecutors consulted the synagogue's board of directors, who voted to approve the deal. On 29 November 2023, Sechriest was sentenced to 10 years in prison, 3 years of supervised release post-prison, and ordered to pay $470,000 in restitution to Congregation Beth Israel.

According to the synagogue's rabbi, members of the interfaith community donated more than $100,000 toward the recovery efforts. Almost two years after the arson, Congregation Beth Israel held its first Shabbat services in the building on August 25, 2023. Due to damage to the main sanctuary, the synagogue converted its social hall into a temporary space for worship. It refashioned the stained glass windows into an eternal flame.

== See also ==
- List of attacks on Jewish institutions
