= Killing of Paul Kessler =

2023 death of a Jewish man in California, U.S.

Paul Kessler, on November 5, 2023, shortly before his fatal injury

Paul Kessler was a 69-year-old Jewish American man who was killed during an altercation on November 5, 2023, between dueling pro-Israel and pro-Palestine demonstrations in Thousand Oaks, California, United States. Kessler's death was ruled a homicide. On November 16, suspect Loay Alnaji was taken into custody on charges of involuntary manslaughter and battery in the death of Kessler. He pled guilty to both charges in May 2026. In July 2026, Alnaji was sentenced to one year in the county jail, followed by two years of probation.

== Victim ==
Kessler grew up in the tight-knit Jewish community of Scranton, Pennsylvania. He was known as an ardent Democrat who was passionate about progressive causes and Israel. He had worked as a medical sales person, and was married for 43 years with a son.

Prior to the protest, Kessler had been previously diagnosed with a brain tumor.

== Incident ==
At dueling pro-Israel and pro-Palestine demonstrations on the Gaza war in Thousand Oaks on November 5, 2023. About 75 to 100 people were gathered at the intersection for the two protests, which were held by two groups; "Freedom for Palestine" and "We are Pro-Israel." Police patrolling the area reported seeing no indication of violence about fifteen minutes before the altercation reportedly happened. Kessler and a pro-Palestinian supporter had reportedly been involved in an altercation, and Kessler had at some point fallen backwards and hit his head on the ground.

Reports of Kessler being struck by a pro-Palestinian supporter in the face with a megaphone were reported, and prosecutors would later submit evidence in court showing that Kessler's DNA was found on the rim of the megaphone that Alnaji is accused of holding. County medical examiner Dr. Othon Mena testified that Kessler died from blunt force trauma caused by the blow from the megaphone and the subsequent fall.

According to the lawyer of Loay Alnaji, a 50-year-old male pro-Palestinian supporter, Kessler reportedly got in the face of many of the pro-Palestinian protestors and stuck his phone in Alnaji's face.

At around 3:20PM responding deputies and EMS responded to calls and found Kessler on the ground conscious and able to speak. Alnaji stayed at the location until deputies arrived to indicate his involvement and called 911 after he fell. Bleeding from the head and mouth, Kessler was transported to the hospital, where he was responsive and conscious to speak with law enforcement at the hospital. He died early the next day, November 6, at the hospital.

== Investigation ==
The Ventura County Sheriff's Office initially stated on November 7 at a news conference that there were conflicting accounts from eyewitnesses about the events leading to Kessler's death, and urged anyone with information to come forward. Sheriff Fryhoff indicated that surveillance footage and other media collected at the scene did not provide a clear view of the encounter and many witnesses disagreed on things such as what caused the fall and who began the confrontation.

Ventura County Sheriff's Office deputies detained a suspect in Kessler's death, who had remained on the scene after calling 911, answering officers' questions. The sheriff's office released the suspect after questioning, then later searched his home. The medical examiner ruled the cause of death to be homicide, and noted non-lethal facial injuries that could have resulted from being hit. Prior to charges being filed and a suspect arrested officials reportedly reviewed over 600 pieces of evidence, which included media from the demonstration and interviewed more than 60 witnesses.

Released findings from Kesslers autopsy showed that he had suffered injuries consistent with a fall, such as skull fractures, brain swelling and bruising along with nonlethal injuries to his face. In a May 2024 judicial hearing, prosecutors presented DNA analysis showing that blood found on the megaphone matches Kessler.

== Perpetrator ==
On November 16, the Sheriff's Office announced that they had arrested a 50-year-old male suspect, Loay Alnaji, in connection to Kessler's death on the charge of involuntary manslaughter and battery with a $1 million bail. He pled not guilty in Ventura County Superior Court the next day, with bail reduced to US$50,000, and was ordered to relinquish his U.S. and Jordanian passports.

Alnaji's lawyer stated that, while they did not contest an altercation occurred, Kessler was combative toward the pro-Palestinian protesters, Alnaji had not caused Kessler to fall, and was between six and eight feet from Kessler when he fell. The prosecution has not found evidence that Alnaji had committed a hate crime, and in a May 2024 press release they stated “While antisemitic hate speech was heard at the November 5, 2023, rally, there is no evidence those words were said by Alnaji”.

Alnaji, a professor of computer science at Moorpark College, had previously expressed pro-Palestinian views on social media. Shortly after his arrest, his biography was removed from the Moorpark College website and the Ventura County Community College District placed him on administrative leave.

In June 2024, Alnaji pleaded not guilty to involuntary manslaughter, and Battery, both felonies. On May 5, 2026, one week before his scheduled jury trial, Aljani changed his plea to guilty, on felony charges of involuntary manslaughter and battery with serious bodily injury.

In July 2026, Alnaji was sentenced to a year in county jail, followed by two years of probation. The Ventura County prosecutor objected to the sentence, saying that "the circumstances of this case and the death that resulted" should have been punished with incarceration in state prison.

== Aftermath ==
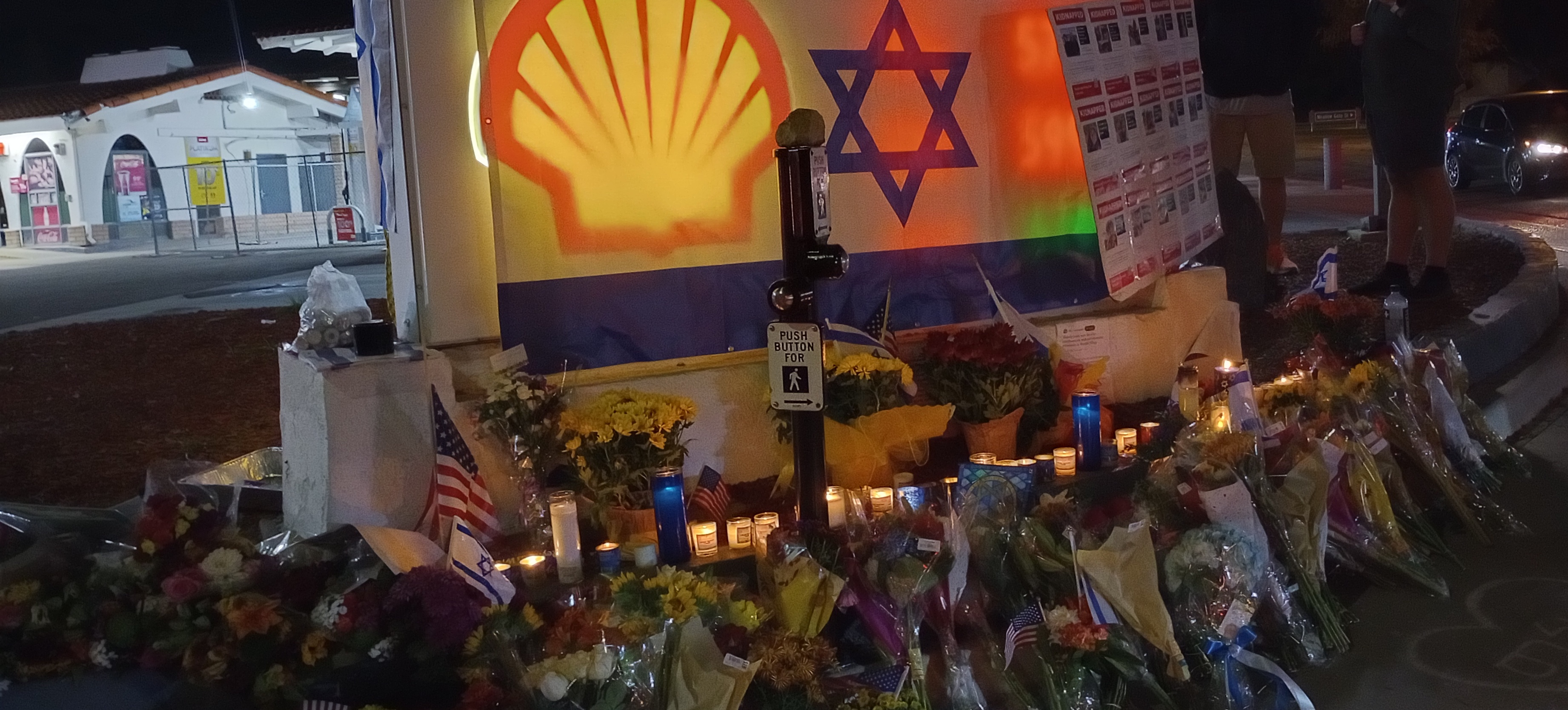
Flowers, candles, flags, and messages in chalk left at intersection where Paul Kessler fell and was mortally injured

A memorial was set up at the street corner where Kessler was fatally injured. A vigil and then a rally were held there. The family of Kessler announced that there would be a private funeral after realizing the scope of people that may want to attend and asked for privacy. After Kessler's death the Sheriff's Office increased patrols at and around Muslim and Jewish places of worship and community gathering centers.

A year after his death in 2024, a crowd gathered to honor Kessler and pay tribute to him.

== Reactions ==
Los Angeles Mayor Karen Bass said, "We mourn the death of the Jewish man who died after being injured during a protest in Thousand Oaks. As details emerge and are confirmed, we stand resolute in condemnation of violence and antisemitism."

The Jewish Federation of Greater Los Angeles called Kessler's death an "antisemitic crime" and stated that violence against the Jewish people had no place and they would not tolerate violence against the community. The Council on American-Islamic Relations denounced the alleged attack and expressed support for the Jewish community.

Joshua Burt, the Anti-Defamation League’s regional director for the Central Pacific Region, was one of several Jewish leaders who criticized the sentence. Burt called it a "slap on the wrist" that was out of line with the characteristics of the incident and stated that the sentence imposed by the judge does not give confidence to the area's Jewish community about the court's capabilities to keep them protected, amid a sharp increase in antisemitic incidents in the state.

== See also ==
- Antisemitism during the Gaza war
- Violent incidents in reaction to the Gaza war
- Murder of Wadea al-Fayoume
- 2023 shooting of Palestinian students in Burlington, Vermont
- Attack on Joseph Borgen
- Attack on Matt Greenman
