= Within Our Lifetime =

American pro-Palestinian activist group

Within Our Lifetime - United For Palestine
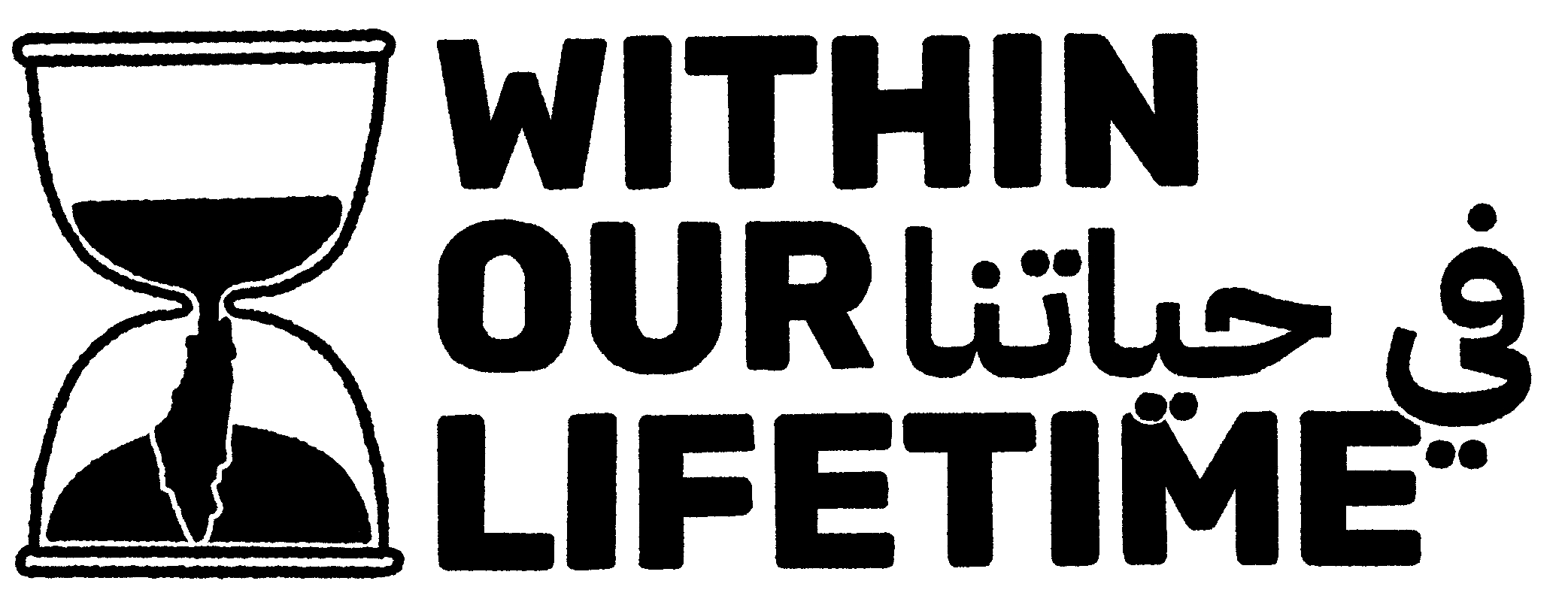
- Founder and chair: Nerdeen Kiswani
- Website: wolpalestine.com

Within Our Lifetime – United For Palestine (WOL) is an American pro-Palestinian and anti-Zionist activist organization primarily active in New York City. The organization was founded and is currently led by Nerdeen Kiswani, a Palestinian-American Muslim. They are based out of Bay Ridge, a neighborhood in Brooklyn that is home to the majority of Palestinians in New York City. The Jerusalem Post has described them as the region's leading pro-Palestinian activist group.

WOL organizes around four principles: the Palestinian right of return, anti-Zionism, the Palestinian right to resist, and internationalism. While the organization is centered around Palestinian liberation, they are also generally anti-imperialist. WOL has praised Hamas and engaged in confrontational protest tactics, attracting criticism from politicians such as Alexandria Ocasio-Cortez. A protester at a pro-Palestine march organised by WOL attacked a Jewish counterprotestor, Matt Greenman, in 2022.

== Origin and description ==
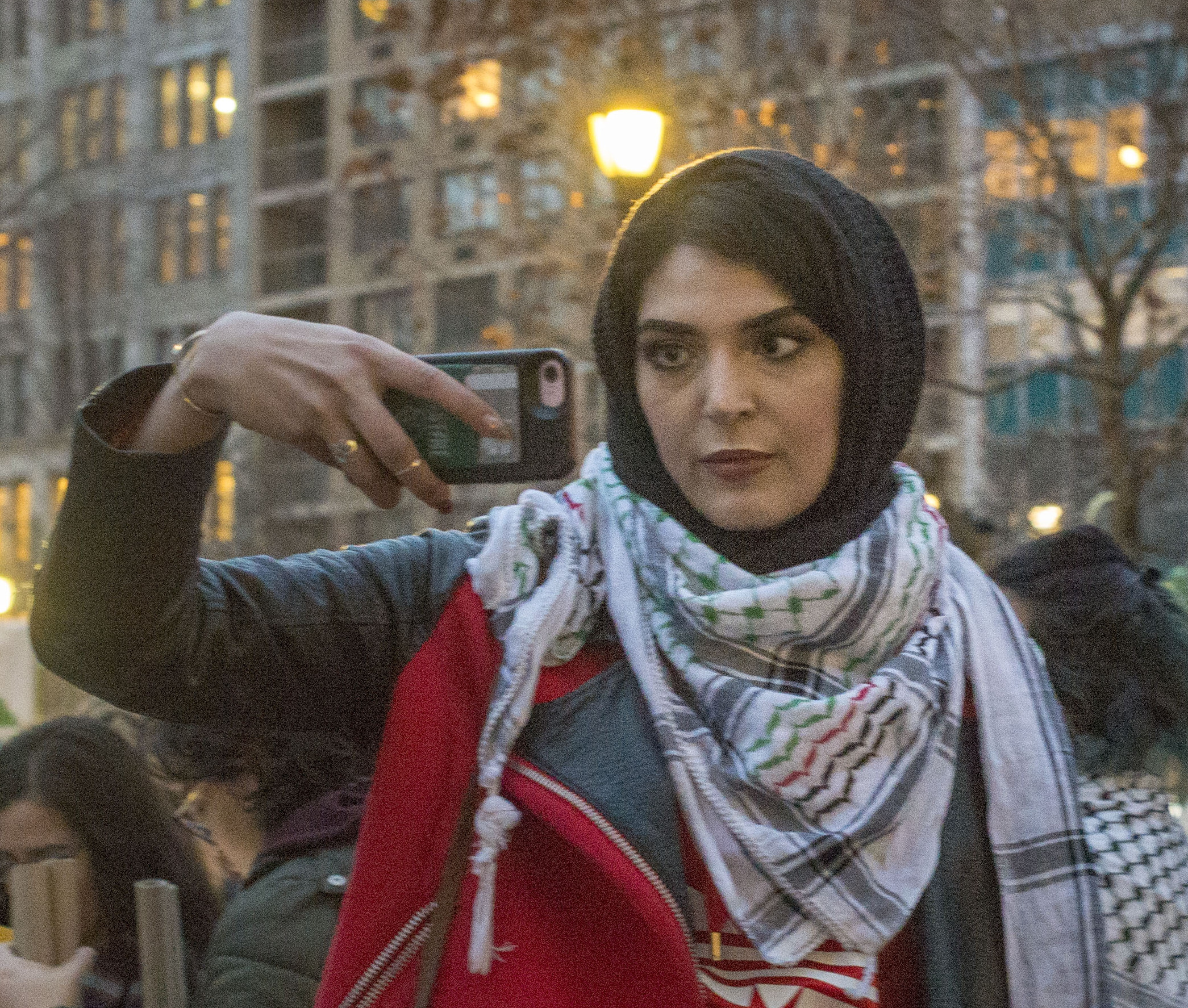
Nerdeen Kiswani in 2017

WOL was founded in 2015 as NYC Students for Justice in Palestine. It took on its current name in 2018. The name "Within Our Lifetime" was chosen as a reflection of Nerdeen Kiswani's confidence in an imminent Palestinian liberation, as reflected in one of the group's protest chants, "We will free Palestine, within our lifetime!" Kiswani is the child of Palestinian refugees from Beit Iksa. She was born in Jordan but grew up in Brooklyn, where her parents owned a restaurant. She was formerly president of the Students for Justice in Palestine (SJP) at CUNY School of Law. Besides Kiswani, other prominent organizers include Abdullah Akl and Fatima Mohammed. WOL is active on university campuses, primarily in the New York City area. Jews from the anti-Zionist Haredi sect Neturei Karta have often participated in WOL's protests. Within Our Lifetime is not legally registered as a nonprofit and has no paid staff. It has a few dozen members, and its demonstrations typically attract a few hundred participants.

== Gaza war protests ==
=== Support for Palestinian political violence ===
WOL has expressed support for Hamas and Palestinian political violence against Israel in general. After the October 7 attacks, WOL helped organize anti-Israel rallies in New York, releasing a statement supporting Palestinian violence against Israel: "Supporting Palestinian liberation is supporting whatever means necessary it takes to get there. Freedom has only ever been achieved through resistance." At the end of October, WOL's website praised the Hamas attack. It was later replaced by a denunciation of Israel's military operations in the Gaza Strip.

On June 10, 2024, WOL organized a protest at an exhibition commemorating the Nova music festival massacre on October 7. Protesters set off flares, waved flags of Hamas and Hezbollah, and displayed banners with messages such as "Long live October 7" and "The Zionists are not Jews and not humans." The protesters were recorded chanting pro-Palestinian and anti-Israel slogans. This protest was condemned by government officials including White House spokesman Andrew Bates, New York Mayor Eric Adams, and Representative Ritchie Torres. Alexandria Ocasio-Cortez and Jamaal Bowman also accused WOL of antisemitism.

=== Conflict with the Democratic Party ===
WOL expressed hostility to American president Joe Biden and New York City mayor Eric Adams on account of their pro-Israel stances, and the group diverges from other pro-Palestinian groups such as Jewish Voice for Peace and Democratic Socialists of America in that they do not wish to work with the Democratic Party.

On March 28, 2024, WOL and other groups organized protests outside a Democratic Party fundraiser for President Joe Biden at Radio City Music Hall. Biden was joined by former presidents Barack Obama and Bill Clinton at the event. Later that evening, after the fundraiser ended, WOL continued protests outside the InterContinental New York Barclay Hotel, where Biden was staying overnight.

On June 22, 2024, WOL held a protest against a joint rally held by legislators Jamaal Bowman, Alexandria Ocasio-Cortez, and Bernie Sanders. WOL said the legislators should refuse to endorse Biden as the Democratic candidate in the 2024 presidential election and stop equating anti-Zionism with antisemitism. Bowman and Ocasio-Cortez had previously condemned the WOL protest at the Nova Festival massacre exhibition as antisemitic.

=== Campus occupation at Columbia University ===
On April 17, 2024, WOL protestors arrived outside of Columbia University to support the campus occupation by pro-Palestinian student demonstrators, demanding the university cut all financial ties with Israel. WOL organized protests around the campus perimeter in support of the encampment, clashing with the NYPD. Protestors were ultimately suppressed by the NYPD, which raided campus on April 30.

=== Response by the New York City Police Department ===
WOL has routinely clashed with the NYPD, and accuses them of intensifying repression on pro-Palestinian demonstrations. The NYPD has deployed its Strategic Response Group and flown helicopters and drones at WOL protests since the start of the Gaza war on October 7, 2023 and banned the group's use of megaphones and air horns entirely. Local publication Hell Gate has referred to this as an "escalating crackdown on pro-Palestine protests". During a protest on November 10, 2023, WOL protestors clashed with the NYPD after vandalizing the New York Times building, tearing down American flags, and attempting to force their way into Grand Central Terminal.

After a WOL Nakba Day protest on May 18, 2024, videos circulated showing some demonstrators being pushed to the ground and struck repeatedly by officers. Mayor Adams defended the NYPD's response, praising it and calling WOL protestors an "unruly group of people". Kaz Daughtry, the NYPD Deputy Commissioner of Operations, argued that the demonstration was not peaceful and that protestors spit on and threw water at officers, lit "incendiary devices", and rode on the roof of an MTA bus.

== Accusations of antisemitism ==
The Times of Israel has pointed to various instances of criticism of Within Our Lifetime for its anti-Israel sentiments. It has been described by New York Jewish Week as "hardline" for "echo[ing] Hamas talking points and routinely call[ing] for Israel's destruction."

At a 2022 pro-Palestine march organised by WOL, a protester, Saadah Masoud, attacked Matt Greenman, a Jewish man wearing an Israeli flag as a cape. Masoud subsequently pled guilty to a federal hate crime, related to the Matt Greenman attack and two prior events where Masoud assaulted Jewish people. Masoud was one of three protesters at WOL marches arrested or imprisoned for attacking Jews as of November 2023.

WOL's protest outside the NOVA exhibition was condemned by local and national politicians, including White House spokesperson Andrew Bates and Alexandria Ocasio-Cortez.

The Times of Israel reported in November 2023 that the group posted maps on its social media accounts that detailed the locations of organizations that supported Israel in New York City, including Israel's consulate, the Central Fund of Israel, the Jewish Communal Fund, Blackrock, The New York Times, and Penn Station, saying they had "blood on their hands." The post ended with the phrase "From the river to the sea". The posts were condemned by elected officials and Jewish leaders, who claimed that the maps were antisemitic. Several other CUNY groups also shared the maps before they were deleted by WOL. WOL stated that "the locations were chosen for their complicity in the genocide of Palestinians and have nothing to do with Judaism or Jewish people in general."

Kiswani states that WOL opposes Zionism as an ideology, not Jews as a people, noting that the group chants "Judaism, yes, Zionism no". The anti-Zionist Jewish organization Jewish Voice for Peace has expressed its support for WOL: Playwright Sarah Schulman, a member of its advisory board, believes that Kiswani's positions stem from her experience as the daughter of Palestinian refugees whom Israel denied access to the West Bank.

== See also ==
- Together for Palestine
- Writers Against the War on Gaza
- Artists4Ceasefire
- Film Workers for Palestine
- 2024 pro-Palestinian protests on university campuses
