= Violent incidents in reaction to the Gaza war =

Since October 2023, numerous violent incidents prompted by the Hamas attack on Israel and the ensuing Gaza war and Gaza genocide have been reported worldwide. They have accompanied a sharp increase in manifestations of antisemitism and Islamophobia, as well as anti-Israeli sentiment and anti-Palestinian racism or broader anti-Arab racism around the globe. Other people and groups have also been targeted, such as Sikhs, who are sometimes mistakenly identified as Muslims or Arabs by their attackers. (Note: Misidentification has become more common in the United States since the September 11 attacks in 2001.)

== Attacks against Jews and Israelis ==
=== Europe ===
On 18 October 2023, two Molotov cocktails were thrown at a synagogue in the Mitte neighborhood of central Berlin. One person was arrested. On 21 October an explosive device was detonated near the Israeli embassy in Cyprus, four men of Syrian origin were detained.

On 4 November 2023, a Jewish woman was stabbed in Lyon, France and a swastika was graffitied on her home.

On 11 December 2023, a 16-year-old was arrested by Austrian police for planning to attack a synagogue in Vienna.

On 31 January 2024, a potentially dangerous device was found near the Israeli embassy in Stockholm, prompting a large evacuation in the surrounding area. The incident was investigated by the national bomb squad.

In France, sites vandalized include schools, nurseries, and The Wall of the Righteous, a memorial that honors individuals who saved Jews during the Nazi occupation of France. The incident was described as antisemitic by French President Emmanuel Macron, President of the Conseil Représentatif des Institutions juives de France Yonathan Arfi, and the Union of Jewish Students in France. On 17 May 2024, a synagogue in Rouen was set on fire by an Algerian arsonist who was shot dead at the scene, damaging the synagogue significantly.

On March 2, 2024, an Orthodox Jew was stabbed by a 15-year old in Zürich, Switzerland. The teen later said that he was doing the attack on behalf of Al-Aqsa, alluding to Jihadist concepts. The teenager declared his allegiance to Islamic State (ISIS) in a video manifesto.

On 3 June 2024, a suspect of foreign nationality was detained in Romania after throwing Molotov cocktail outside Israeli embassy in Bucharest which caused no damage and casualties. According to the embassy he was of Syrian origin and allegedly threatened to ignite himself.

On 4 July 2024, Greek anti-terrorism police arrest seven people, including foreign nationals, over arson attacks against an Israeli-owned hotel and a synagogue in central Athens.

On 16 February 2025, two Palestinian men attacked an Israeli couple in Athens after hearing them speak Hebrew and seeing their Star of David necklaces, resulting in one of the victims being stabbed on his forehead.

==== United Kingdom ====
On 2 October 2025, a terrorist attack took place outside the Heaton Park Hebrew Congregation in Manchester, UK, during Yom Kippur. The attacker, Jihad al-Shamie, a 35-year-old British citizen who had immigrated from Syria, rammed a car into pedestrians and stabbed worshippers before being shot dead by police. Two people were killed and three were seriously injured. Investigators later reported that one fatality and another victim may have been struck by police gunfire as officers ended the assault.

In March and April 2026, a series of attacks targeted London's Jewish community. The attacks have involved arson, explosive devices and chemicals, and targeted Jewish schools, synagogues and charities. Responsibility for the attacks was claimed by Harakat Ashab al-Yamin al-Islamia, which is believed to be a front group for Iran's Islamic Revolutionary Guard Corps, who had outsourced the acts to local criminals and used the group to create plausible deniability. This included an arson attack on four Hatzola emergency vehicles in Golders Green, London, in March 2026 and stabbings in the same area at the end of April.

=== Russia ===
In late October 2023, a wave of antisemitic attacks occurred in the North Caucasus region of Russia, including an attack by hundreds of people on airline passengers arriving in Dagestan from Israel.

=== Asia Pacific ===
==== Australia ====
On 13 December 2025, 15 people were murdered in a mass shooting at Bondi Beach, Sydney, targeting a Chabad-organised Hanukkah event. It was carried out by father and son Sajid Akram and Naveed Akram, resident in Bonnyrigg, in Western Sydney.

=== China ===
On 13 October an Israeli diplomat was stabbed in Beijing, China, for which a foreign suspect was arrested.

=== North Africa ===
On 8 October, a police officer fired his gun into a group of bus passengers in Alexandria, Egypt. The attack occurred during a trip past Pompey's Pillar. Two Israeli tourists and an Egyptian tour guide were killed, while another Israeli was moderately wounded. The suspect was subsequently taken into custody.

On 17 October the El Hamma synagogue in El Hamma, Tunisia, a historic synagogue and the burial site of 16th-century Kabbalist Rabbi Yosef Ma'aravi, was severely damaged during anti-Israel riots, with hundreds of people filmed setting fire to the building. On the same day, the Or Zaruah synagogue in Melilla, a Spanish enclave in North Africa, was attacked by a mob chanting "murderous Israel" while waving Palestinian flags.

On 7 May 2024, Israeli-Canadian businessman Ziv Kipper, head of Egyptian food exporter OK Group, was fatally shot in Alexandria by a group named "Vanguards of Liberation - the Martyr Mohammad Salah group," a reference to the Egyptian police officer who fatally shot three Israeli soldiers. The group, who described Kipper as a Mossad agent, said the murder was in retaliation to "massacres in Gaza" and the Rafah offensive.

=== North America ===
==== Canada ====
On 7 November, there was an attempted arson attack against Congregation Beth Tikvah synagogue and a Jewish Community Center in Montreal.

On 9 November in Montreal, two Jewish children's schools, Talmud Torah Elementary and Yeshiva Gedola, were targeted with gunfire overnight, leaving bullet holes. On 12 November, Yeshiva Gedola was struck with gunfire for a second time. In a press conference that day, Montreal Mayor Valerie Plante said, "The Jewish community in Montreal is currently under attack."

Shortly after midnight on 27 November, a Jewish community center belonging to the Jewish Community Council of Montreal was attacked with a Molotov cocktail.

==== United States ====
On 25 October 2023, a man broke into a Jewish family's home in Los Angeles yelling "Free Palestine" and "Kill Jews".

On 3 November 2023, CNN reported on the arrest of 20 year-old Jordanian national for plotting a terrorist attack against the Jewish community in Houston, Texas.

Paul Kessler, a 69-year-old Jewish man, was fatally injured in a dispute between pro-Israel and pro-Palestine demonstrators on November 5 in Westlake Village, Los Angeles County, California. A suspect, Loay Alnaji, was charged with involuntary manslaughter and battery, with Kessler's blood found on his megaphone. Alnaji has pled not guilty, claiming self-defense.

On 4 February 2024, a Palestinian migrant ripped two pro-Israel flags from a home in Hewlett, New York. When the homeowner confronted him and attempted to take back the flags, the man punched him and put him into a chokehold while yelling pro-Palestine phrases. When the homeowner could no longer fight back, the man stomped on the flags and stole them. The man was arrested later and charged with a hate crime.

On 10 August 2024, 22-year-old Victor Sumpter stabbed a Jewish man in his 30s near the headquarters of the Chabad Lubavitch movement in Crown Heights, Brooklyn while yelling "Free Palestine". The Jewish man was hospitalized and was expected to recover. Sumpter was arrested and charged second-degree assault as a hate crime.

On August 29, 2024, Ahmed Al Jabali attacked Jewish barber Slava Shushakov in his barbershop in Yonkers, New York, stabbing and slashing him with his own barber's shears while shouting antisemitic slurs. He was sentenced in April 2025 to six years in prison for Assault in the Second Degree as a Hate Crime, a class C violent felony.

On October 26, 2024, a man in Chicago was arrested and charged with 14 felonies after shooting a 39-year-old Jewish man who was walking to synagogue. The gunman, Sidi Mohamed Abdallahi, also shot at police and paramedics before being apprehended. Alderman Debra Silverstein called for the case to be treated as a hate crime. On November 1, authorities charged Abdallahi with terrorism and hate crime charges. Chicago mayor Brandon Johnson condemned the attack following Silverstein's criticism of his initial failure to identify the victim as "a Jewish man, wearing traditional Jewish garb, walking to a Jewish place of worship on the Jewish day of rest."

In February 2025 Noora Shalash, the former CAIR Kentucky Director, assaulted a visibly Jewish man in Manhattan while demanding Jihad and wishing ISIS to "kill all of you". When questioned on camera she cursed both Jews and Zionists. CAIR condemned the incident and noted the organization had not employed her for five years.

On April 13, 2025, police arrested Cody Balmer for an arson attack against the Pennsylvania Governor's Residence, while the Jewish Governor Josh Shapiro and his family were asleep on the first night of Passover. Dauphin County District Attorney Fran Chardo called the attack a hate crime, based on Balmer's statements of hatred for the governor over his support of Israel.

In May 2025, a shooting by a pro-Palestinian activist outside of the Capital Jewish Museum in Washington, D.C. resulted in the deaths of two Jewish people who worked as aides for the Israeli embassy.

On 1 June 2025, in Boulder, Colorado, a man used Molotov cocktails to attack participants of a march for solidarity with Israeli hostages.

=== Alleged plots in Latin America ===
On 8 November 2023, two men were arrested by Brazilian police in São Paulo following a warning from the Mossad that Hezbollah was planning an attack against the country's Jewish community. Searches were also conducted in Brasília and Minas Gerais in connection with the alleged plot.

== Attacks on people who appeared Arab or Muslim ==
On 15 February 2025 in Miami Beach, Florida, a 27-year-old Jewish man, Mordechai Brafman, was arrested after he opened fire upon a vehicle carrying two people who he mistakenly thought were Palestinians. According to the arrest report, while in custody, Brafman, a supporter of Israel, made a statement claiming, "While driving my truck, I saw two Palestinians and shot and killed both". In fact, the victims were both Israelis, and their injuries were not life-threatening.

== Attacks against Palestinians, Arabs, and Muslims ==
=== Australia ===
A homeowner in Sydney was threatened with a bomb attached to his car after flying a Palestinian flag in front of his home. The man responsible, David Maurice Wice, was charged with leaving or sending a substance/article to create false belief of danger, stalking and intimidating, entering enclosed land without lawful excuse, and using a carriage service to menace, harass or offend. He was sentenced to 12 months in jail with a non-parole period of three months, plus two years of community corrections.

=== Europe ===
==== Netherlands ====
On 6 and 7 November 2024, Israeli fans of Maccabi Tel Aviv Football Club were reported to have removed Palestinian flags from houses, made racist anti-Arab chants, assaulted people, and vandalised local property. They were later attacked by pro-Palestinian protesters and Amsterdam residents in a series of riots. In total, up to 30 people were injured, seven of whom were hospitalized, and 62 people were arrested. The Jerusalem Post and The Times of Israel described the violence as a pogrom, and the Israeli government sent emergency flights to evacuate its citizens. In a statement she has since retracted, Amsterdam mayor Femke Halsema referred to the attackers as "antisemitic hit-and-run squads". Some Israeli and Jewish figures, including US Special Envoy to Monitor and Combat Antisemitism Deborah Lipstadt, compared the event to the 1938 Kristallnacht pogrom in Nazi Germany.

=== United States ===
==== Midwest ====
Outside Chicago, Illinois, 71-year-old landlord Joseph Czuba yelled, "You Muslims must die" stabbed a 32-year-old female Palestinian-American tenant, seriously injuring her, and stabbed her six-year-old son 26 times to death. Czuba targeted the family because they were Muslim, and he was upset about the conflict. In 2025, Czuba was convicted of first degree murder, attempted first degree murder, and two hate crimes charges, and sentenced to 53 years in prison.

On October 19, a man in Dearborn, Michigan was arrested by local police after posting on Facebook a credible threat proposing acts of violence against Palestinian-Americans in Dearborn, which has the largest population of Arab Americans in the United States. The man had posted an open invitation to "hunt Palestinians" and claimed to be part of a Jewish group protecting Israel.

In October 2024, a 7-year-old Yemeni American girl was stabbed in the neck at a park in Detroit, Michigan. The alleged perpetrator's family stated they believed he was experiencing a mental health episode, and the Wayne County Prosecutor's Office stated it did not have evidence that the incident was a hate crime. The victim's mother, however, stated she believed the stabbing was a possible hate crime. According to the family, the girl and her grandmother were the only Arabs in the park at the time of the attack. The Council of American Islamic Relations and Arab-American Civil Rights League both called on the incident to be investigated as a hate crime.

==== Western United States ====
The Council on American–Islamic Relations (CAIR) in Los Angeles called for an investigation to be opened by the University of California, Los Angeles after a group of men entered a space used by students watching a webinar of an ongoing panel titled "The Crisis in Palestine". The men reportedly damaged students property, verbally assaulted them calling them "terrorists" and physically threatening them before campus security removed them from the area. One of the group was allegedly spotted later at a on-campus vigil for Israel.

On 4 November, an Arab Muslim student at Stanford University in California was hit by car driven by a white man who yelled, "fuck you and your people." The incident was investigated as a hate crime.

==== Eastern United States ====
Chapters of CAIR have reported other instances of Islamophobia since the war began with two alleged assaults' in Brooklyn, New York City and an individual who pointed a gun at pro-Palestine demonstrators outside of the Pennsylvania state capitol. On October 28, a Princeton University staff member who took issue with a message assaulted a student at a protest.

On 25 November, three Palestinian college students from Brown University, Haverford College, and Trinity College in Burlington, Vermont were confronted and shot and wounded by a white man, leaving one of the students in critical condition.

On 4 January 2024, an imam in New Jersey was killed. On 19 January 2024, Columbia University students reported that a hazardous chemical was sprayed at or near student protesters, while a pro-Palestinian divestment now rally was held. At least ten protestors reported physical symptoms with three seeking medical attention. The substance was identified by some protestors as Skunk, manufactured by the Israeli firm Odortec and has been used against demonstrators in the West Bank.

In October 2024, 23-year-old Jennifer Guilbeault was indicted for second-degree assault as a hate crime, third-degree assault as a hate crime, and second-degree aggravated harassment for a unprovoked attack with pepper spray on a Muslim Uber driver on the Upper East Side in New York City. In April 2025 Guilbeault pleaded guilty to a misdemeanor harassment charge and was sentenced to 100 hours of community service and ordered to take a bias training course. In Brooklyn, a group of unknown individuals were being investigated after they made anti-Palestinian comments toward a couple and punched them in the face multiple times.

==== Southern United States ====
In February 2024, a 23-year-old Palestinian-American man was stabbed after attending a pro-Palestinian rally in Austin, Texas. Police called the stabbing a potential "bias-motivated incident". In a statement relayed by his father, the young man stated, "Mr. President, Mr. Joe Biden, I blame you for what happened to me." The stabbing was deemed a hate crime.

On June 23, 2024, a Jewish woman named Elizabeth Wolf in Euless, Texas attempted to drown a 3-year-old Muslim Palestinian child after making racist statements to the child's mother. She is currently out on a $25,000 bond for attempted capital murder and $15,000 for injury of the child. The representative for Euless, Salman Bhojani - who is Muslim himself - condemned the incident, saying "Hate has no place in Euless, District 92, or anywhere in our great state".

== Self-inflicted violence ==
On February 25, 2024, Aaron Bushnell, a 25-year-old serviceman of the United States Air Force, died after setting himself on fire outside the front gate of the Embassy of Israel in Washington, D.C. Immediately prior to the live-streamed act, Bushnell said that he was protesting against "what people have been experiencing in Palestine at the hands of their colonizers" and declared that he "will no longer be complicit in genocide", after which he doused himself with a flammable liquid and set himself on fire. As he burned, Bushnell repeatedly shouted "Free Palestine" while one Secret Service officer pointed a gun at him and two others attempted to extinguish him.

Bushnell was not the first person in the US to use self-immolation to protest against Israel over the Palestinian humanitarian crisis. On December 1, 2023, an individual, whose identity was not revealed by Atlanta authorities, protested via self-immolation outside the Israeli consulate in Atlanta, Georgia, which resulted in the protester having critical injuries.

== See also ==
- Aftermath of the September 11 attacks
- International reactions to the Gaza war
- Massacres, hostage taking, and mass imprisonment during the Gaza war
- War crimes in the Gaza war
