= Visa and deportation controversies in the second Trump administration =

Use of immigration procedures to target political dissidents residing in the US

During the second presidency of Donald Trump, the United States has pursued a policy of targeting political dissidents, particularly pro-Palestinian international students and academics, for deportation. As of April 17, 2025, over 1,000 international students and graduates had had their visas revoked or their status terminated, and by May 15, 2025, almost 2,000 student visas had been canceled, though many had been restored by courts. Many of the visas were revoked based on minor violations such as speeding tickets, and only for a handful was national security cited as the basis for revocation. Unsealed court depositions have revealed extensive use of the website Canary Mission by the Trump administration to identify pro-Palestinian activists for deportation and the heavy involvement of Trump aide Stephen Miller.

== Background ==
The United States has long used its immigration policy as a tool for political control, particularly during the First and Second Red Scare. During the Palmer Raids, hundreds of left-wing immigrants were deported due to their political activities. Deportation was used to circumvent their constitutional rights when they could not be charged with a crime in the domestic legal system. Fear of immigrant radicalism led to the passage of the Immigration Act of 1924 and the Immigration and Nationality Act of 1952, which expanded the government's powers to investigate and deport immigrants for their political beliefs.

In August 2015, during his first presidential campaign, Trump proposed mass deportation of illegal immigrants. He proposed a "Deportation Force" to carry out this plan, modeled after the 1950s-era "Operation Wetback" program during the Dwight Eisenhower administration that ended after a congressional investigation. He returned to this idea during his third presidential campaign, and blurred the distinction between legal and illegal immigrants, promising to deport both. To achieve the goal of deporting millions per year, Trump stated his intention to expand deportations without due process, which would be accomplished by the expedited removal authorities of 8 U.S. Code § 1225; invoking the Alien Enemies Act within the Alien and Sedition Acts of 1798; and invoking the Insurrection Act of 1807 to allow the military to apprehend migrants and thus bypass the Posse Comitatus Act.

U.S. Immigration and Customs Enforcement (ICE) raids would expand to include workplace raids and sweeps in public places. Stephen Miller said that illegal immigrants would be taken to "large-scale staging grounds near the border, most likely in Texas", to be held in internment camps before deportation. In September 2024, Trump told a rally audience that the deportation effort "will be a bloody story".

== Use of social media to identify potential deportees ==
The Trump administration is reportedly using an artificial intelligence "catch and revoke" program to scrape social media posts and identify students who allegedly support Hamas. A number of detained and deported activists have been targeted by doxing campaigns before their arrest.

On March 25, 2025, the state department issued a directive stating that visa applicants would be ineligible if their social media activity indicated that they were "advocating for, sympathizing with, or persuading others to endorse or espouse terrorist activities or support a designated foreign terrorist organization", and that similar activity could result in the revocation of existing visas. On April 9, the Department of Homeland Security (DHS) announced it would screen social media accounts for anything it deems "antisemitic".

== Targeting of higher education ==
The administration has focused its catch and revoke program on foreign students who have engaged in pro-Palestinian speech, characterizing them as pro-Hamas. The government plans to use its Student and Exchange Visitor Program to review institutions of higher education that have had significant pro-Palestinian protests, suggesting that it may decertify those institutions, making them ineligible to enroll student visa holders. Revocation of student visas also threatens a revenue stream for colleges and universities, with one senior Department of Justice official saying, "That's one of their biggest cash cows, foreign students."

On April 8, 2025, in response to the large number of student visa revocations, Inside Higher Ed began tracking the number of known visa revocations for students and recent alumni and mapping the colleges and universities reporting visa revocations. As of April 9, the tracker showed 419 students and recent alumni from over 80 institutions of higher education across the U.S. In many cases, immigration authorities had not notified the institutions of the reasons for the visa revocations.

On May 28, 2025, Secretary of State Marco Rubio announced that the US would "aggressively revoke visas for Chinese students" and "revise visa criteria to enhance scrutiny of all future visa applications from the People's Republic of China and Hong Kong." China's ministry of foreign affairs formally objected to Rubio's announcement.

=== American Association of University Professors v. Rubio ===
American Association of University Professors v. Rubio
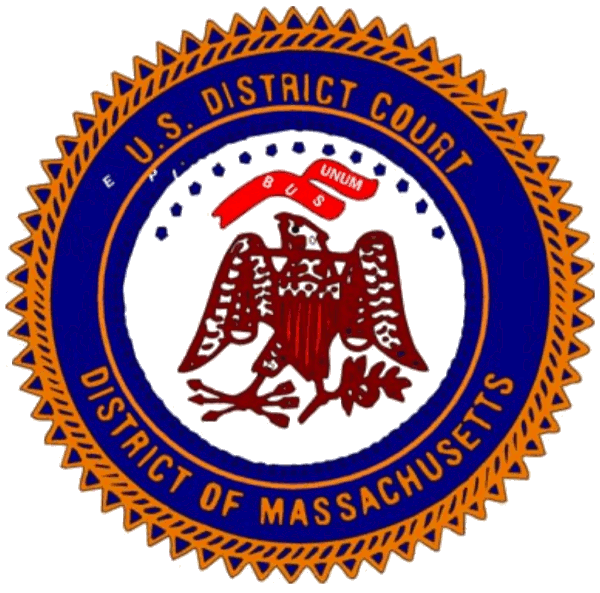
- Court: District of Massachusetts
- Started: March 25, 2025
- Docket nos.: 1:25-cv-10685

Court membership
- Judge sitting: William G. Young

On March 25, 2025, the American Association of University Professors and the Middle East Studies Association sued the Trump administration, arguing that it was promoting an "ideological-deportation policy" that harmed not only those the administration was attempting to deport but also university communities more generally, and that pursuing students and faculty on the basis of their views is unconstitutional. The plaintiffs, represented by the Knight First Amendment Institute at Columbia University, filed their suit in the District Court for the District of Massachusetts, and asserted that the policy violated the First and Fifth Amendments. The case, American Association of University Professors v. Rubio, was assigned to Judge William G. Young.

The Trump administration moved that the case be dismissed for lack of standing, and also claimed that there was no ideological-deportation policy and that the district court had no jurisdiction over immigration enforcement. On April 30, 2025, Young dismissed the Fifth Amendment challenge but ruled that the First Amendment challenge could proceed, saying, "It is well established that noncitizens have at least some First Amendment rights, and political speech is 'at the core of what the First Amendment is designed to protect.'"

On July 9, 2025, unsealed deposition transcripts by Young revealed that the Trump administration relied heavily on the website Canary Mission to identify pro-Palestinian activists for deportation, and that Trump aide Stephen Miller was deeply involved in the effort.

In September 2025, Young ruled for the plaintiffs, holding that the government had violated the First Amendment, and concluding:

[T]his Court finds by clear and convincing evidence that the Secretary of Homeland Security Kristi Noem and the Secretary of State Marco Rubio, together with the subordinate officials and agents of each of them, deliberately and with purposeful aforethought, did so concert their actions and those of their two departments intentionally to chill the rights to freedom of speech and peacefully to assemble of the non-citizen plaintiff members of the plaintiff associations.

The decision notably contained a lengthy rebuke of President Trump, saying he violated his oath of office to the Constitution and engaged in "a full-throated assault on the First Amendment".

==== January 2026 ====
April 2025 memo from Marco Rubio determining that Mahmoud Khalil is deportable on the grounds that Khalil's "presence or activities in the United States would have potentially serious adverse foreign policy consequences for the United States."

In January 2026, Young unsealed internal documents that, according to The New York Times, "indicate that in nearly all instances, the arrests of the students were recommended based on their involvement in campus protests and public writings, activities that the Trump administration routinely equated to antisemitic hate speech and support for terrorist organizations." The administration wrote of multiple students, "D.H.S. has not identified any alternative grounds for removability" other than a determination by the US Secretary of State that "the alien's presence or activities in the United States would have potentially serious adverse foreign policy consequences for the United States" on the basis of "the alien's past, current, or expected beliefs, statements, or associations that are otherwise lawful". The administration wrote that there was no evidence Öztürk had "engaged in any antisemitic activity” or made “any public statements indicating support for a terrorist organization or antisemitism generally." An official testified in 2025 that the administration reviewed lists compiled by Canary Mission and Betar US.

In January 2026, Young declared the policy unlawful under the Administrative Procedure Act. Young also gave AAUP or MESA members challenging adverse immigration status changes a presumption that the change was retribution from their protected speech. He wrote, "Relief is limited pursuant to CASA" and "Plaintiffs [...] have shown by clear and convincing evidence that Secretaries Noem and Rubio have intentionally and in concert implemented Executive Orders in 14161 and 14188 a viewpoint-discriminatory way to chill protected speech" that "violated the First Amendment." "Upon the [...] filing a complaint" by an AAUP or MESA member, "removal from the United States is automatically stayed during the pendency of the Sanction Action. The United States bears the burden affirmatively to ascertain and determine whether such person has filed a Sanction Action in the United States District Courts [...] The reason for this burden-shift is to prevent the apparent present practice of whisking non-citizens out of the district to avoid jurisdiction. The burden is minimal: all the United States need do is check the Sanction Plaintiff's name on PACER [...] This stay is akin to those temporary stays presently in effect in many district courts. See, e.g., United States v. Russell". Young also appended "two hypotheticals" that "are not of record in this case". The first is a noncitizen from Venezuela who is a member of the AAUP or MESA and whose temporary protected status is revoked. "the government's got to prove it [i.e. that the Presidential action in no way constituted retribution]. And that's part of the sanction." The second hypothetical is a noncitizen member of the AAUP or MESA who says something about the assassination of Charlie Kirk. "Well again, the government's going to have to prove that their reason was not in fact in retribution ... and in addition, my second, that it's an appropriate exercise of governmental power."

== Detention of activists ==
=== Yunseo Chung ===
Chung is a Columbia University student who came to the U.S. from South Korea at age 7 and is a lawful permanent resident with a green card. On March 5, she was among a group of protesters arrested during a sit-in at Barnard College to express solidarity with students protesting the Gaza war who had been expelled. Charges against Chung were dropped. The government characterized the protest as "pro-Hamas", a claim Chung's lawyer rejected, saying, "The idea that a valedictorian just shows some humanity to fellow people is somehow a threat to U.S. foreign policy, and it really makes you wonder what's going on with our foreign policy."

On March 10, federal law enforcement told Chung's lawyer that Chung's permanent resident status was being revoked. Agents searched for Chung at her dorm and her parents' home, though she was not there. Federal agents had searched for Chung at various Columbia residences pursuant to a federal criminal warrant for harboring out-of-status noncitizens. Chung's lawyer filed a petition for a writ of habeas corpus in the District Court for the Southern District of New York, and the case was assigned to judge Naomi Reice Buchwald, who ruled that Chung could not be detained for the time being. The stay on Chung's detention was extended in May and blocked by a federal court ruling in June.

=== Beto Coral ===
Franklin Humberto "Beto" Coral Garrido is a Colombian who had a pending asylum application to the US. He is an active supporter of former Colombian president Gustavo Petro and has expressed opposition to far-right Colombian president Abelardo de la Espriella. On June 16, 2026, ICE arrested Coral in front of his 12-year-old son and his dog. When Coral showed the officers copies of his asylum application and approved work permit, they presented a letter from US Secretary of State Marco Rubio purporting to terminate his work permit because his advocacy "undermines US foreign policy interests in Colombia's democratic processes". Days after his arrest, Coral had still not obtained legal representation because he was being moved between jurisdictions. A former ICE legal officer accused Rubio of "Castro-like heavy-handed tactics", while DHS said Coral had violated US law by overstaying a tourist visa and would remain in custody pending removal proceedings. Coral accepted voluntary departure to Colombia in July 2026. He has since left Colombia.

=== Aditya Wahyu Harsono ===
On March 27, 2025, Aditya Wahyu Harsono, an Indonesian citizen and hospital supply chain manager, had his visa revoked without notice and was arrested by ICE at his workplace and detained in the basement of a hospital in Marshall, Minnesota, before being transferred to Kandiyohi County Jail. Harsono's attorney said that ICE coerced hospital management into staging a meeting so that he could be apprehended. Harsono was fired from his job after his arrest. When he attempted to tell ICE agents that he had legal status during his arrest, he was told that the system that could verify this was "down" for the day. Harsono had participated in the Daunte Wright protests in 2021 and was arrested for violating a curfew order. He also frequently posted in support of Gaza on social media and ran a small nonprofit to raise money for aid to Gaza. The Minnesota Nurses Association denounced his arrest.

On May 14, after Harsono had been detained for 49 days, a district court judge ordered his release. The judge found that his arrest and detention were likely in retaliation for his political activities.

=== Mahmoud Khalil ===
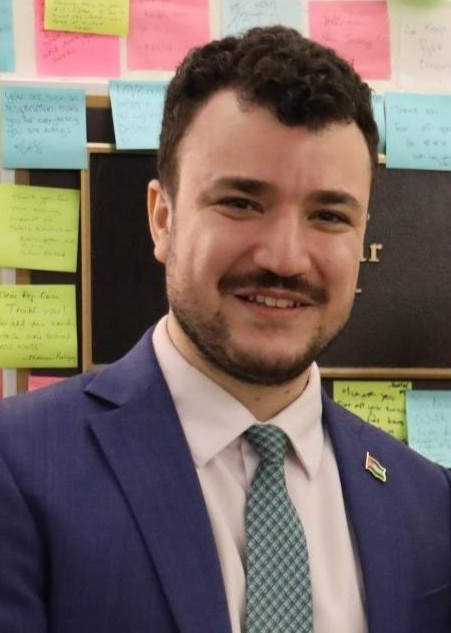
Mahmoud Khalil

The detention of Mahmoud Khalil (March 8–June 20, 2025; 104 days) was the US federal government's incarceration and attempted deportation of Mahmoud Khalil, a student at Columbia University and a lead negotiator of the Gaza Solidarity Encampment during the Gaza war and genocide. On March 8, 2025, plainclothes US Immigration and Customs Enforcement (ICE) agents took Khalil—who had not been accused of, charged with, or convicted of any crime—from his Columbia residential apartment building in the Morningside Heights neighborhood of New York City. The agents did not have a warrant and were acting on orders from the State Department to revoke Khalil's student visa. When the agents were informed that Khalil is a lawful permanent resident, they said that status would be revoked instead. By March 10, ICE had transported Khalil to its LaSalle Detention Center in Jena, Louisiana, where he was held until being released on bail on June 20.

The detention became the first publicly known deportation effort related to pro-Palestine activism during the presidency of Donald Trump, who threatened to punish students and others for allegedly engaging in activities "aligned to Hamas". Khalil's detention received widespread backlash from civil rights organizations, members of the Democratic Party, and lawyers, who argue that it was an attack on freedom of speech and the First Amendment.

There was no criminal charge against Khalil; instead, the government's argument depends on a section of the Cold War–era Immigration and Nationality Act of 1952 (INA), which provides that aliens in the U.S. may be deported if the secretary of state believes their presence will have serious negative consequences for U.S. foreign policy. Several journalists and human rights organizations have noted this law's connection to McCarthyism. Later in March, the government alleged that Khalil had lied on his green card application.

On April 1, 2025, New Jersey federal district judge Michael E. Farbiarz issued a stay on Khalil's deportation while the court considered the constitutionality of his arrest and detention. Farbiarz later ruled that the relevant section of the INA was likely unconstitutional and ordered that Khalil be released on bail. After the government appealed, the Third Circuit ruled on January 15, 2026, that Khalil must exhaust the immigration court system before resuming his case in the federal court system. On April 11, 2025, Louisiana immigration judge Jamee E. Comans ruled that Khalil was deportable under Secretary of State Marco Rubio's assertion that Khalil's continued presence posed "adverse foreign policy consequences". Comans said she had no authority to question that determination. She later ruled that Khalil was deportable to Syria or Algeria on the basis that he had omitted information about his organization memberships when he applied for his green card. Khalil is appealing to the Board of Immigration Appeals.

The targeting of Khalil has been described as an example of the Palestine exception.

=== Leqaa Kordia ===
On March 14, 2025, the Department of Homeland Security announced that it had arrested another Columbia student, Leqaa Kordia, for overstaying her student visa. Kordia is a Palestinian from the West Bank who was residing in New Jersey and had been arrested in 2024 for her involvement in a protest for Gaza. Her mother lived in Gaza, and Kordia was separated from her for 20 years. 200 of her extended family members living in Gaza had been killed since the start of the Gaza war. ICE targeted Kordia after the NYPD shared information that it had gathered on her with ICE. This information was used as evidence in her deportation case. This collaboration with ICE raised questions and concerns about New York City's adherence to sanctuary laws intended to prevent local police from assisting in federal immigration enforcement efforts. In April, a judge granted her bond, but the government invoked a rarely used provision to prevent her release while it appealed the decision. In its appeal, DHS accused Kordia of supporting Hamas. She refuted these claims in court. As of May 28, Kordia was being held at the Prairie Land Detention Center in Texas. Kordia said she was held in an overcrowded 37-person capacity cell with 86 other people for several weeks and forced to sleep on concrete. She said the bathroom was open with limited privacy. She also said she was denied halal food, accommodations for fasting, and hijab and clothing accommodations. She had a hearing scheduled for June 5 in Dallas. Her second hearing resulted in another order of her release, which was again appealed by ICE. In February 2026, Kordia was hospitalized after suffering a seizure in detention. In March, after more than a year in detention, she was released on a $100,000 bond. She still faces deportation proceedings.

=== Mohsen Mahdawi ===
On April 14, 2025, Mohsen Mahdawi, a Palestinian Columbia University student and 10-year U.S. resident who was seeking U.S. citizenship, was arrested at the ICE office in Colchester, Vermont, after what he had been told would be a naturalization interview. While at Columbia, Mahdawi was one of the leaders of the pro-Palestinian protests. He had been targeted by pro-Israel groups and individuals online since 2024, including Canary Mission and Betar. Mahdawi went into hiding after Khalil's detention and asked Columbia administrators to help him find a safe place to live, which they refused to do. He is facing a deportation order to the West Bank, which he called "a death sentence" due to the ongoing and escalating Israeli incursions into the territory which have affected several members of his family.

On April 14, 2025, Mahdawi's legal team filed a habeas corpus petition against Donald Trump and his administration, describing his detention as unlawful. His lawyers requested a temporary restraining order to prevent him from being transferred out of Vermont by federal authorities. Vermont federal judge William K. Sessions III granted the request and ordered that Mahdawi remain in Vermont. The case, in the District Court for the District of Vermont, was reassigned to Judge Geoffrey Crawford, and on April 30, Crawford granted Mahdawi's request to be released on bail, and said the case raised a "substantial claim that the government arrested him to stifle speech with which it disagrees." The Trump administration appealed to the Court of Appeals for the Second Circuit, asking the court for an emergency stay of Crawford's ruling and challenging the determination that Crawford had authority to make such a ruling. The case was assigned to judges Susan Carney, Alison Nathan, and Barrington Parker, and on May 9, they denied the appeal.

=== Rümeysa Öztürk ===
On March 25, 2025, six masked plainclothes agents from the US Department of Homeland Security (DHS) arrested 30-year-old Turkish national and Tufts University student Rümeysa Öztürk in Somerville, Massachusetts after the US State Department's revoked her F-1 student visa for co-authoring an op-ed in The Tufts Daily. She was then taken from Massachusetts to the South Louisiana ICE Processing Center and detained there.

Öztürk's arrest sparked condemnation from elected officials and others. Some accused the Trump administration of targeting students for their political views without due process, while others called it a violation of civil liberties. The incident also provoked protests at Tufts University and across Massachusetts.

As of April 17, 2026, Öztürk has returned to Turkey to continue her career as a scholar studying child development. With the help from ACLU, she and the Trump administration have jointly requested the termination of proceedings in front of the Board of Immigration Appeals.

=== Salah Sarsour ===
On March 30, 2026, ten ICE agents pulled Salah Sarsour over and detained him after following him from his Milwaukee, Wisconsin home. Sarsour is a businessman and the president of the Islamic Society of Milwaukee, the state's largest mosque. He is involved with pro-Palestinian advocacy organizations and has spoken in support of Palestinian causes. His wife, children, and grandchildren are US citizens. ICE transferred him to the Clay County, Indiana jail. He has no criminal record in the US; he is charged with being a threat to US foreign policy based on two arrests in Israel, one of which occurred when he was a teenager, before his approval for legal permanent resident status. Local elected officials and clergy members called for his immediate release. His attorneys are concerned about the lack of basic medical care for his diabetes. On June 18, Sarsour was released on a judge's order as he awaited further action on his case. In September, an immigration judge ruled that he can be deported.

=== Ranjani Srinivasan ===
Srinivasan, an Indian national and Fulbright scholar at Columbia, chose to self-deport after having her visa revoked. She had been detained during the Hamilton Hall protests, but all charges were dismissed. Her attorney said she had not participated in the protests. Srinivasan was also accused without evidence of being a supporter of Hamas.

=== Ahwar Sultan ===
In early 2025, 12 Ohio State University students' visas were revoked, including that of Ahwar Sultan, an Indian citizen and OSU graduate student who had been arrested in 2024 in connection with the OSU Gaza Solidarity Encampment. Sultan later sued the Trump administration, challenging the revocation of his visa.

On April 25, 2025, Students for Justice in Palestine and allied campus organizations held a press conference outside Thompson Library in support of Sultan, with SJP co-president Jineen Musa among the organizers. According to OSUPD and university spokesperson Chris Booker, attendees were asked to comply with campus standards restricting amplified sound before 5:30 p.m. on weekdays by not using amplified sound but did not stop after being asked.

After the event ended, police detained Sultan and Musa. Sultan was warned, but did not receive a court summons. Musa was issued a summons for criminal trespass, despite attempts by university faculty to talk down OSU police.

=== Badar Khan Suri ===
Khan Suri, a Georgetown University researcher from India with a student visa, was detained by federal immigration authorities on March 17, 2025. The government revoked his visa but did not charge him with a crime. He has no criminal record. Khan Suri's lawyer argued in his petition to the court that Khan Suri was targeted because of his U.S. citizen wife's Palestinian heritage and because the government suspects that the couple opposes U.S. foreign policy. A 2018 article about the couple in the Hindustan Times said his wife's father served as a "senior political adviser to the Hamas leadership", and a government spokesperson, Tricia McLaughlin, later accused him of "actively spreading Hamas propaganda and promoting antisemitism" and having connections to a terrorist. Khan Suri, his attorney, and his wife disputed this characterization, saying that he made social media posts "expressing support for the Palestinian people, criticizing the death toll in Gaza, affirming international law principles, and criticizing U.S. support for Israel's war in Gaza", but that he did not attend any protests, have contact with his father-in-law, or express pro-Hamas or antisemitic sentiments.

Khan Suri was held in Texas, where an immigration court hearing was scheduled for May 6. The Georgetown chapter of Faculty and Staff for Justice in Palestine organized a rally calling for his release. In an open letter printed in the university's newspaper, The Hoya, a group of over 130 Jewish students, faculty, staff and alumni, condemned his arrest and detention, writing, "President Trump is weaponizing Jewish identity, faith and fears of antisemitism as a smokescreen for his authoritarian agenda". Khan Suri petitioned a district court in Virginia to return him to that state, and on May 14, Judge Patricia Tolliver Giles ordered Khan Suri's release from ICE detention. Upon his release, Khan Suri decried the conditions of his detention, saying he was treated like a "subhuman" and as a high-security prisoner. His habeas petition said he was denied halal food, given only two hours of recreation time, and placed in a "TV room" without a bed or quiet conditions for sleeping. The government then filed a motion in the US Court of Appeals for the Fourth Circuit, asking it to stay Tolliver Giles's release order while the government appealed her ruling, but on July 1, the appeals court denied that motion.

=== Momodou Taal ===
Taal is a Cornell University graduate student with dual United Kingdom and Gambian citizenship. On March 22, 2025, he was told to surrender himself at the ICE office in Syracuse, New York. Taal's lawyers, fearing the Trump administration would target Taal, preemptively filed a lawsuit asking a New York federal judge to strike down Executive Orders 14188 and 14161 targeting student protestors. Taal's lawyers said he had been surveilled by law enforcement.

Taal faced suspension for allegedly attending a protest at Statler Hotel to shut down a career fair where representatives from Boeing and L3Harris were recruiting. Instead of a suspension, which could have affected his visa status, university officials chose to ban him from campus.

In February 2024, during a protest against the Cornell Student Assembly's rejection of a divestment resolution, Taal led chants outside Cornell's Day Hall and told the crowd, "We are in solidarity with the armed resistance in Palestine from the river to the sea". Taal elaborated on his views in an interview, saying he supported no particular Palestinian militant faction but rather "the Palestinian right to resist to colonialism, as guaranteed by international law and the principle of self-determination".

A Jewish colleague of Taal called accusations of antisemitism against him baseless, saying, "I've always seen Momodou treat everyone with the utmost respect, and I think it's truly awful that these false accusations of antisemitism are being weaponized."

On March 28, 2025, U.S. District Judge Elizabeth Coombe ruled against Taal, saying that his lawyers had neither established that she had jurisdiction to stop the deportation nor shown that there was any clear threat to his constitutional rights that the lawsuit would address.

On March 31, 2025, Taal announced that he had voluntarily left the United States citing fears for his personal safety.

=== Jeanette Vizguerra ===
Vizguerra, an activist for immigrant rights who came to the United States from Mexico in 1993, had obtained multiple stays of deportation under past administrations and gained a national profile in 2017 when she sought refuge from ICE in a Denver church. ICE detained her on March 17, 2025. Her apprehension by ICE was denounced by local politicians and organizations including Jared Polis and Mike Johnston as a political persecution and urged ICE to focus on violent offenders, and U.S. District Court Judge Nina Y. Wang blocked her deportation.

Vizguerra has called herself as a political prisoner, and she and her lawyers are contesting her deportation on the grounds that it is motivated by her protected political activities, not her immigration status. Vizguerra said that the ICE agent who arrested her had her social media pulled up on his phone. The Trump administration argued that, as a noncitizen, Vizguerra had no legal basis to argue that her detention was politically motivated. Vizguerra has also blamed the financial interests of private prison companies such as GEO Group and CCI Corporation for the Trump administration's efforts to fill detention beds.

In May 2025, Maria Hinojosa interviewed Vizguerra in the GEO Group-run Aurora detention center where she was being held. Hinojosa, who has experience conducting prison interviews, said the detention center's security and conditions were harsher than in maximum-security prisons.

In December 2025, Vizguerra was released after 9 months and 7 days in detention. Judge Wang ruled her prolonged detention unconstitutional. In her court case, the government argued that Vizguerra should have to wear an ankle bracelet, but Wang denied this request. Vizguerra is required to check in with ICE in January, and must give 48 hours notice before crossing state lines.

=== Beto Coral ===
On June 16, ICE arrested Beto Coral, a Colombian asylum seeker who had lived in the US since 2015. He was targeted by Secretary State Marco Rubio over his support for Colombian president Gustavo Petro and his criticism of Trump-backed presidential candidate Abelardo de la Espriella. He was deported to Colombia on July 16. Coral said he was beaten, deprived of food and water, and kept in solitary confinement while in ICE detention.

== Farmworkers and union organizers ==
=== Lynn-Ette & Sons farmworkers ===
On May 2, 2025, ICE agents pulled over a bus carrying immigrant workers for Lynn-Ette & Sons who had been in a multi-year battle with their employer over unionization. The employees were from Mexico and Guatemala and were employed as year-round workers. Sources in contact with the workers' families said that the raid "did not appear to be a broad sweep but rather a targeted enforcement aimed at specific people" and that the agents had a list of workers they expected to find on the bus. ICE did not identify themselves during the raid, but later confirmed they had been responsible for the arrests. As of May 5, five of the workers' locations were known while the other nine were unaccounted for. Lynn-Ette & Sons denied any prior knowledge or responsibility for the raid.

=== Vermont migrant organizers ===
In June 2025, José Ignacio "Nacho" De La Cruz and his stepdaughter Heidi Perez, both members of the farmworker-led immigrant rights group Migrant Justice, were violently arrested in Vermont by Border Patrol agents who smashed their car window and detained them. According to a spokesperson for Migrant Justice, De La Cruz called a hotline for migrant workers and remained on the phone with them while "calmly exercising his right to remain silent, requesting that border patrol explain the cause of the traffic stop." In court documents, De La Cruz said that CBP agents hurt him and Perez, and threatened to hurt them or retaliate against their families if they did not cooperate. He also alleged that an agent told them they had "no rights" and refused to allow them a phone call. De La Cruz and Perez are in custody at Richford immigration station pending removal proceedings. De La Cruz was a member of Migrant Justice's steering committee and a worker-owner in a Vermont construction cooperative. He helped pass legislation protecting the rights of farm workers and dairy workers, such as the Vermont Housing Access for Immigrant Families bill. Perez had advocated for the extension of need-based financial aid and in-state tuition to all state residents. Supporters said the pair were taking groceries to migrant workers afraid to leave their homes when CBP apprehended them. CBP later accused De La Cruz of transporting other migrants within the United States, but did not charge him with a crime. Migrant Justice spokesperson Will Lambek said that CBP's allegations "do not change the essential fact that Nacho and Heidi were detained without cause while delivering food to farmworkers" and that they were "wholly unrelated to the actual circumstances of their violent detainment." The pair's detention provoked rallies in support of their freedom at the Richford border station, the Vermont Statehouse, and a federal court in Burlington.

=== Alfredo Juarez Zeferino ===
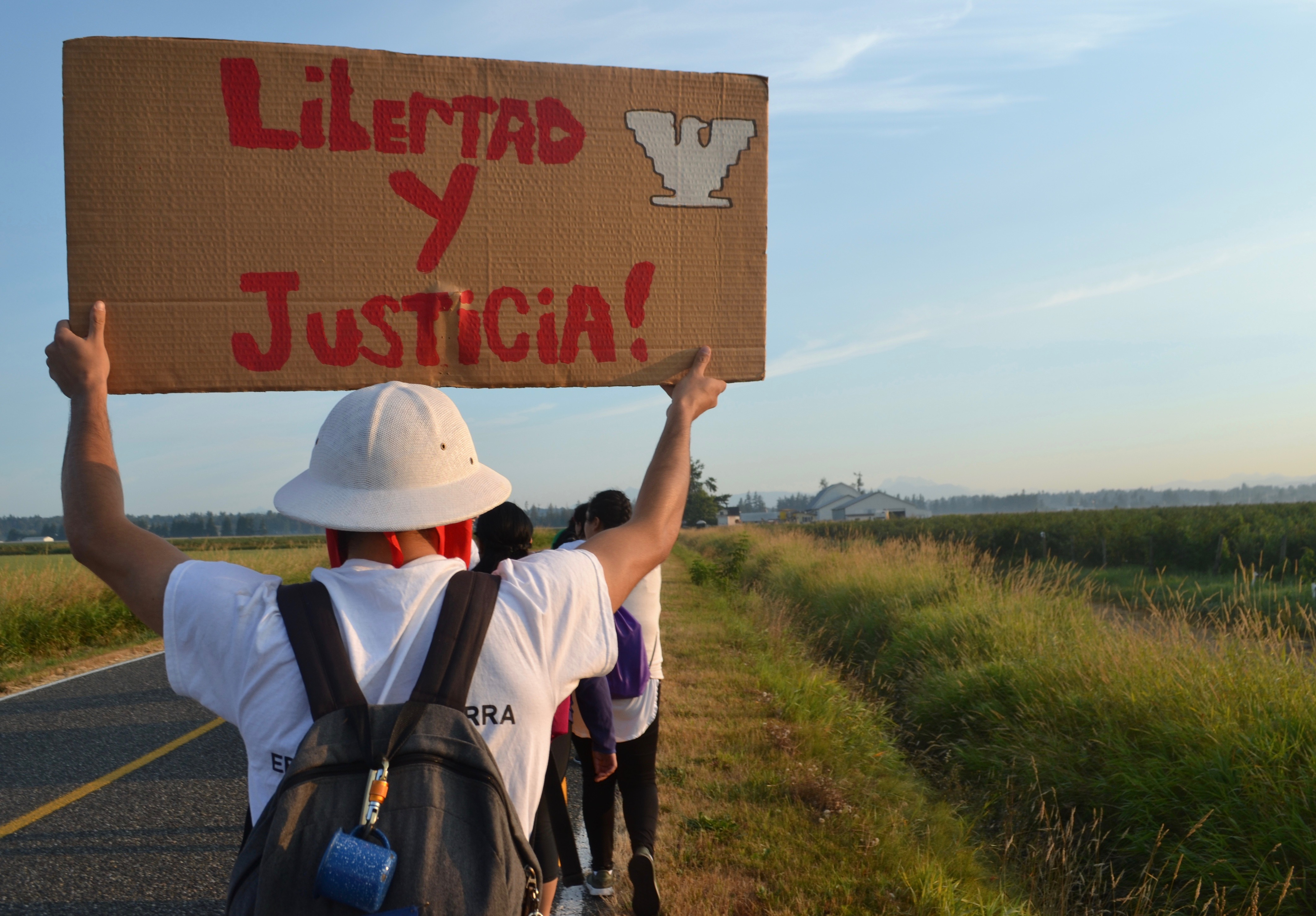
Familias Unidas por la Justicia march

Alfredo Juarez Zeferino is a farm worker and community organizer who helped found Familias Unidas por la Justicia and pass heat exposure regulation in Washington state. On March 27, 2025, ICE agents stopped his car while he was driving his wife to work, broke his window, and dragged him out of the car. Zeferino was taken to an ICE facility in Ferndale and later to ICE's Northwest Processing Center in Tacoma. His lawyers and community members said he was targeted for his activism. Local leaders including Rick Larsen and Bellingham mayor Kim Lund denounced his detention. Zeferino was detained for 3 1/2 months in a Geo Group detention facility and said he was given only six opportunities to go outside during his confinement. He also said he organized a hunger strike in response to being served unsafe chicken. In July 2025, he chose to voluntarily leave the United States for Mexico, citing the difficulties of fighting an immigration case in the US.

== Other controversies ==
=== Rasha Alawieh ===
Rasha Alawieh was born in 1990. She is a Lebanese transplant nephrologist who had worked as an assistant professor at Brown University. She is a Shia Muslim.

Alawieh obtained her medical degree from the American University of Beirut in 2015. She completed her residency at the American University of Beirut Medical Center in 2018. That year, she obtained a J-1 visa to enter the United States and completed fellowships at Ohio State University and the University of Washington. She completed the Yale Waterbury Internal Medicine Program in June 2024, the same month the U.S. government approved her petition for an H-1B visa, sponsored by Brown Medicine. This visa was issued at the Lebanese consulate on March 11, 2025, and was valid through mid-2027.

Alawieh visited Lebanon in February 2025 to see relatives. While in Lebanon, she attended the funeral of Hassan Nasrallah, the former leader of Hezbollah. Hezbollah has been deemed a designated terrorist organization by the United States Department of State. On March 14, 2025, Alawieh had returned to the U.S. on a flight landing at Logan International Airport in Boston. She was detained at the airport. In her airport re-entry interview, she said she attended the funeral because of Nasrallah's religious position in the Shia community. She said her family in Lebanon was not in Hezbollah, but supported it. Alawieh admitted during questioning that she had sent some images of Hezbollah members.

=== Charlie Kirk critics ===
In October 2025, the U.S. revoked the visas of at least six people for their comments after the assassination of Charlie Kirk. The State Department posted screenshots of social media posts by six people from Argentina, Brazil, Mexico, Germany, Paraguay, and South Africa, saying that they celebrated Kirk's killing. One of them was Nhlamulo Baloyi, a music executive whose controversial comments about white South Africans led the South African Human Rights Commission to seek an apology after they attracted Elon Musk's attention in February. Baloyi wrote that Kirk "won't be remembered as a hero" and "was used to astroturf a movement of white nationalist trailer trash!" Brazilian comedian Tiago Santineli said he did not regret making an aggressive joke on X that led to his visa's revocation. Other posts the State Department targeted drew attention to Kirk's views on race and women, and called him a fascist.

=== Mario Guevara ===
Guevara worked in El Salvador until fleeing the country with his family in 2004 due to political persecution. He then became a resident in the United States, where he mostly reported on the topic of immigration in Atlanta. He was nominated for and won multiple Southeast Emmy Awards. Guevara was ordered removed from the United States by an immigration judge in 2012. He worked for Mundo Hispánico until founding MG News in 2024.

In the past, Guevara had spoken favorably of Republican candidates and policies. In 2022, he said that then-Republican gubernatorial candidate Brian Kemp's victory over Democratic candidate Stacey Abrams would prevent what he described as the Democratic Party's plan of "eradicating" the police in the state of Georgia, even though Abrams had in reality intended to increase police funding. Guevara endorsed Republican insurance commissioner candidate John King, saying that "a lot of our Latino people are conservative" and wishing him four more years in office. In a Facebook live, Guevara said that "a lot of people talk about Republicans being racist... But frankly Georgia Republicans now aren’t the same" as before.

After working as a reporter in Atlanta for about 18 years, Guevara was arrested by Doraville police during his coverage of a No Kings protest in June 2025. Charges against him were dropped and he was taken into ICE custody in order to undergo deportation proceedings. The case was appealed and subsequently closed. Guevara held a work visa and had a pending green card application as of September 2025.

Guevara's case garnered a large number of followers on social media due to his coverage of immigration raids. He remained in detention for over 100 days. The ACLU described his detention and prosecution as political censorship. His detention was opposed by the University of Georgia's First Amendment Clinic, the Society of Professional Journalists, the Committee to Protect Journalists and other journalistic freedom organizations.

Guevara was deported to El Salvador in October 2025. As of January of the following year, he was still reporting on United States immigration issues from outside the United States.

=== Sami Hamdi ===
On October 26, 2025, the British political commentator and critic of Israel Sami Hamdi was taken into ICE detention at San Francisco International Airport while on a speaking tour of the US. ICE said Hamdi's visa had been revoked and he was being held for removal. Far-right political influencer Laura Loomer took credit for Hamdi's arrest. The Council on American-Islamic Relations called for Hamdi's release, calling his arrest "a blatant affront to free speech."

=== Ayman Soliman ===
In July 2025, ICE detained Ohio hospital chaplain and Egyptian political asylee Ayman Soliman at a regular immigration check-in. Soliman sought asylum in the U.S. after working as a freelance journalist in Egypt during the Arab Spring. He was tortured under the Mubarak regime, and abducted again after the 2013 military coup against Mohammed Morsi. Soliman's lawyers believed his detention in the U.S. was related to his work with an Egyptian charitable organization that DHS alleged was associated with the Muslim Brotherhood. Two academics cited in the government case said their work was misrepresented to justify detaining Soliman. Soliman called his experience in detention "traumatizing and dehumanizing" and said he was denied commissary, contact with his lawyer, and visitation while in isolation for five days. He lost his job while in detention, as did two other chaplains who spoke out against his detention. Soliman was released in September and is expected to have his visa status restored. Immigration officials likely concluded that they did not have a case to revoke his visa.

=== El Gamal family ===
Hayam El Gamal, the ex-wife of a 2025 Boulder fire attack suspect, and her five children were detained by ICE shortly after the attack. The Trump administration has repeatedly tried to deport the family but been blocked in the courts. The deportation attempts have kept the family in prolonged detention. The FBI's investigation found no evidence that the family had foreknowledge of the attack.

== Reactions ==
In April 2025, waves of visa revocations and SEVIS terminations sparked widespread alarm and protest from student groups across U.S. university campuses. On April 10, about 150 students and affiliates from UC San Diego marched from the UC San Diego campus in La Jolla to the San Diego Federal Courthouse to demand protections for international students, led by the Students' Civil Liberties Union. On April 12, students and faculty with the UCLA Faculty Association, Students for Justice in Palestine, and the CSU Students for Quality Education organized a rally of over 150 attendees in Downtown Los Angeles in opposition to the mass termination of SEVIS in higher education institutions.

On April 17, it was reported that at least 901 international students at 128 U.S. colleges and universities had sued the Trump administration for denial of due process in relation to these revocations.

On April 22, over 200 higher educational institutions signed a letter pledging to resist Trump's attacks on universities, including the deportation of students. The leaders of several prominent universities, including Harvard University, the University of Pennsylvania, Massachusetts Institute of Technology, and Yale University signed the letter. Columbia University was initially absent from the list, but signed after it went public.

In August 2025, the Stanford Daily sued the Trump administration over its deportation policy, saying that student journalists felt intimidated by the possibility of facing deportation "for being associated with speaking on political topics, even in a journalistic capacity." The lawsuit requested a preliminary injunction to prevent the administration from deporting students for pro-Palestinian speech and activities.

== See also ==
- Democratic backsliding in the United States
- Deportation in the second Trump administration
- Deportations of U.S. citizens in the second Trump administration
- Donald Trump and antisemitism
- Donald Trump and fascism
- Immigration policy of the second Donald Trump administration
- Reactions to the 2024 pro-Palestinian protests on university campuses
- Trumpism
- Activist deportations from Germany
