= Detention of Mahmoud Khalil =

2025 detention by US Immigration and Customs Enforcement's (ICE)

Mahmoud Khalil v. Donald J. Trump
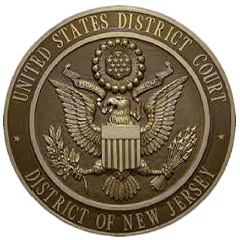
- Court: United States District Court for the District of New Jersey, transferred from United States District Court for the Southern District of New York
- Full case name: Mahmoud KHALIL, Petitioner, v. William P. JOYCE, in his official capacity as Acting Field Office Director of New York, Immigration and Customs Enforcement; Caleb VITELLO, Acting Director, U.S. Immigration and Customs Enforcement; Kristi NOEM, in her official capacity as Secretary of the United States Department of Homeland Security; and Pamela BONDI, Attorney General, U.S. Department of Justice, Respondents.
- Started: March 9, 2025
- Docket nos.: 2:25-cv-01963, having been transferred from 1:25-cv-01935

Court membership
- Judge sitting: Michael E. Farbiarz (transferred from Jesse M. Furman)

Laws applied
- U.S. Const. amend. I, Immigration and Nationality Act of 1952

Keywords
- Free speech; immigrants' rights

Mahmoud Khalil

The detention of Mahmoud Khalil (March 8–June 20, 2025; 104 days) was the US federal government's incarceration and attempted deportation of Mahmoud Khalil, a student at Columbia University and a lead negotiator of the Gaza Solidarity Encampment during the Gaza war and genocide. On March 8, 2025, plainclothes US Immigration and Customs Enforcement (ICE) agents took Khalil—who had not been accused of, charged with, or convicted of any crime—from his Columbia residential apartment building in the Morningside Heights neighborhood of New York City. The agents did not have a warrant and were acting on orders from the State Department to revoke Khalil's student visa. When the agents were informed that Khalil is a lawful permanent resident, they said that status would be revoked instead. By March 10, ICE had transported Khalil to its LaSalle Detention Center in Jena, Louisiana, where he was held until being released on bail on June 20.

The detention became the first publicly known deportation effort related to pro-Palestine activism during the presidency of Donald Trump, who threatened to punish students and others for allegedly engaging in activities "aligned to Hamas". Khalil's detention received widespread backlash from civil rights organizations, members of the Democratic Party, and lawyers, who argue that it was an attack on freedom of speech and the First Amendment.

There was no criminal charge against Khalil; instead, the government's argument depends on a section of the Cold War–era Immigration and Nationality Act of 1952 (INA), which provides that aliens in the U.S. may be deported if the secretary of state believes their presence will have serious negative consequences for U.S. foreign policy. Several journalists and human rights organizations have noted this law's connection to McCarthyism. Later in March, the government alleged that Khalil had lied on his green card application.

On April 1, 2025, New Jersey federal district judge Michael E. Farbiarz issued a stay on Khalil's deportation while the court considered the constitutionality of his arrest and detention. Farbiarz later ruled that the relevant section of the INA was likely unconstitutional and ordered that Khalil be released on bail. After the government appealed, the Third Circuit ruled on January 15, 2026, that Khalil must exhaust the immigration court system before resuming his case in the federal court system. On April 11, 2025, Louisiana immigration judge Jamee E. Comans ruled that Khalil was deportable under Secretary of State Marco Rubio's assertion that Khalil's continued presence posed "adverse foreign policy consequences". Comans said she had no authority to question that determination. She later ruled that Khalil was deportable to Syria or Algeria on the basis that he had omitted information about his organization memberships when he applied for his green card. Khalil is appealing to the Board of Immigration Appeals.

The targeting of Khalil has been described as an example of the Palestine exception.

== Background ==
=== Biography ===
Mahmoud Khalil was a graduate student at Columbia University's School of International and Public Affairs (SIPA) at the time of the 2024 Columbia University pro-Palestinian campus occupations. He is an Algerian citizen with a green card confirming his lawful permanent residency in the U.S.

Khalil's grandparents lived in Tiberias, Palestine (now Israel), before being forced to flee to Syria in the 1948 Nakba. Khalil was born in a Palestinian refugee enclave in Damascus, Syria, in 1995, to Palestinian parents. He and his family fled to Lebanon in 2012 after the onset of the Syrian civil war. Khalil has Algerian citizenship through his mother's family, who were reportedly Algerian revolutionaries displaced to the Ottoman Empire.

Journalist Lauren Bohn, who met Khalil in Beirut while reporting on the Syrian refugee crisis, said Khalil "often referred to himself as a 'double refugee' as a Palestinian in Syria and a Syrian refugee in Lebanon". Bohn reported that Khalil taught himself English while working with Syrian refugees through the Syrian-American education nonprofit Junsoor. Simultaneously, he earned a bachelor's degree in computer science from the Lebanese American University in Beirut. Khalil then spent years working for the British government's Foreign, Commonwealth and Development Office, managing the Chevening Scholarship from the British embassy in Beirut and supporting diplomats with his language skills and local knowledge.

In 2016, Khalil met Noor Abdalla when she joined a volunteer program that he was overseeing in Lebanon. They began a seven-year long-distance relationship. In 2022, Khalil immigrated to the U.S. on a student visa to attend SIPA. As a student, he interned for the United Nations Relief and Works Agency (UNRWA), a United Nations relief agency that supports Palestinian refugees. Khalil married Abdalla in New York in 2023. Abdalla is a U.S. citizen and a dentist. Khalil received his green card in 2024. He completed work on his master's degree in December 2024 and was due to graduate in May 2025.

At the time of Khalil's arrest on March 8, 2025, Abdalla was pregnant with a late April due date. Khalil's attorneys requested a temporary release so that he could be with his wife during their son's birth, but the New Orleans ICE Director denied the request. Abdalla gave birth on April 21, while Khalil was in detention in Louisiana. Khalil later called the government's refusal to let him be present at his son's birth "a clear act of cruelty just to punish me". Despite the Trump administration's opposition, a federal district judge in New Jersey approved a meeting, and on May 22, Khalil met his son and saw his wife for the first time since he was detained.

=== Khalil's participation in Columbia University protests ===
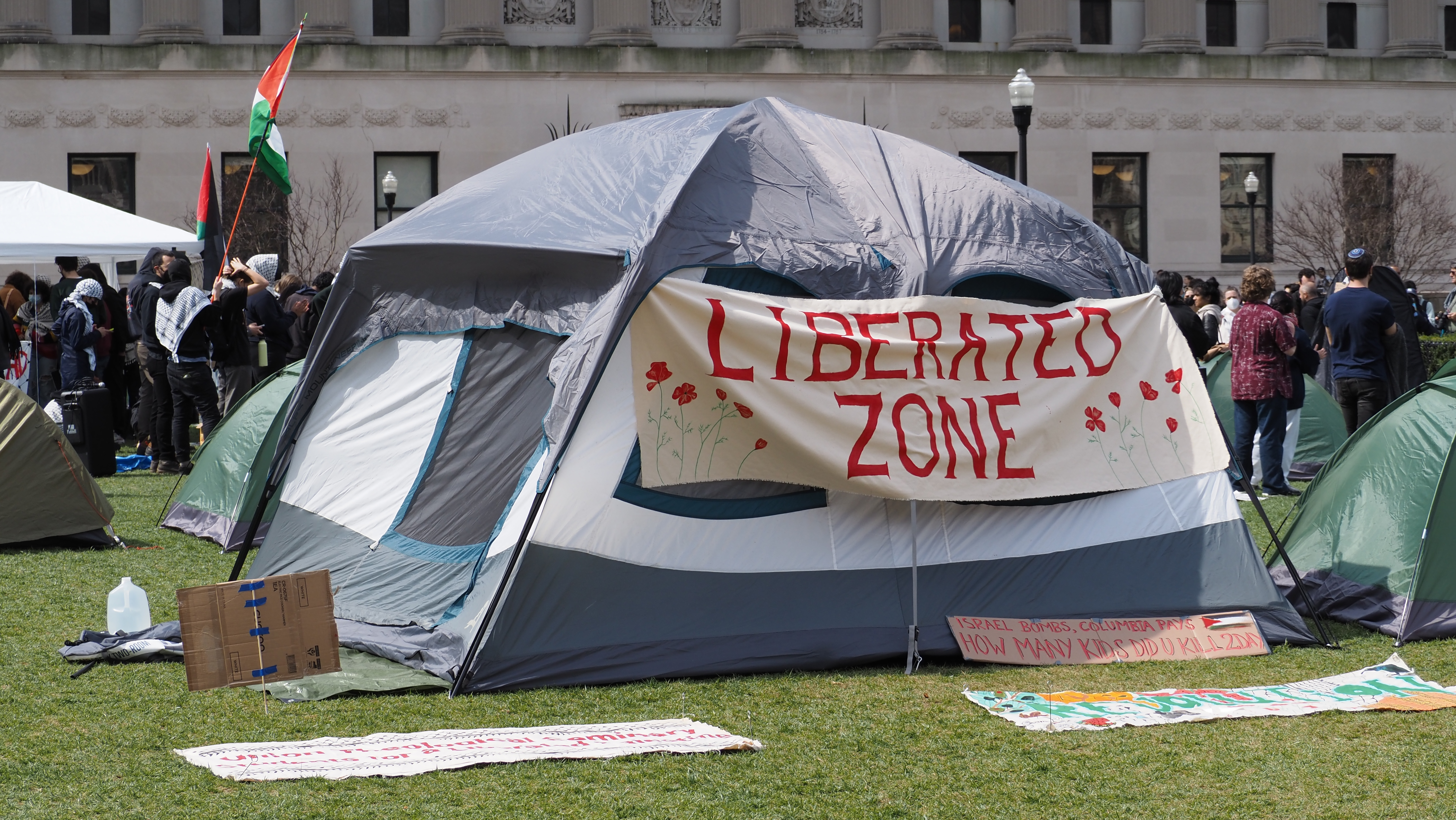
The first iteration of the Gaza Solidarity Encampment on the East Lawn (April 17–18).

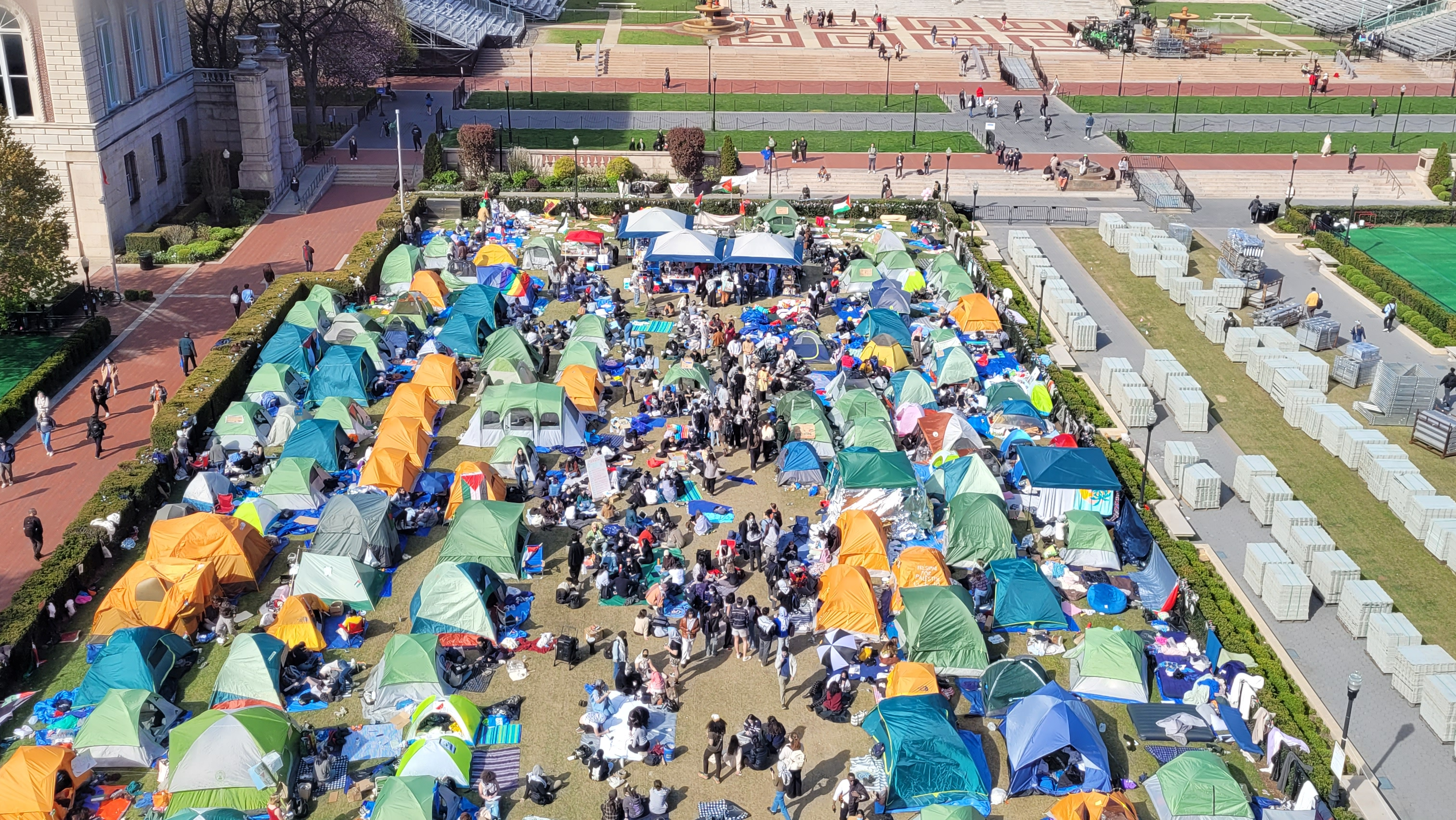
The second, autonomous iteration on the West Lawn (April 18–30), during which Khalil helped negotiate on behalf of the encampment with representatives of Columbia's administration.

As a Columbia student, Khalil was involved with activism in solidarity with Palestine during the Gaza war and genocide, often seen at protests unmasked. In April 2024, Khalil represented the Gaza Solidarity Encampment as a spokesperson and negotiator with Columbia's administration. The encampment, as well as the broader Columbia protests in solidarity with the Palestinians of Gaza, demanded that the university officially call for an end to the war and genocide and divest from Israel, especially from companies whose products, services, or infrastructure it has extensively used in its military operations in Gaza.

The negotiations went on for 10 days, from April 19 to 29. According to the Columbia Daily Spectator, Columbia's leadership did not reveal the chain of command outside the negotiation room and "positioned key administrators to be the public face for negotiations and kept others within University leadership, including the trustees, away from the conversation" so that "the protesters never came into direct dialogue with those empowered to answer their demands". On the morning of April 29, Shafik announced in a university-wide email that negotiations had ceased without having reached an agreement, and that Columbia would "not divest from Israel".

In a 2024 interview, Khalil said, "As a Palestinian student, I believe that the liberation of the Palestinian people and the Jewish people are intertwined and go hand by hand, and you cannot achieve one without the other." He characterized the movement as one "for social justice and freedom and equality for everyone". Discussing concerns about antisemitism, Khalil said: "There is, of course, no place for antisemitism. What we are witnessing is anti-Palestinian sentiment that's taking different forms, and antisemitism, Islamophobia, racism [are] some of these forms." In an interview with CNN, Khalil said Jewish activists were a key part of the pro-Palestinian movement.

At the time, Khalil was on a student visa that required full-time enrollment. He said he avoided "high-risk" protests and communicated with the university to ensure he would not create trouble, as any suspension would jeopardize his student visa. On April 30, 2024, he received an email from Columbia suspending him for alleged participation in the Columbia tent encampments, but the university retracted the suspension within a day after reviewing their evidence. The Columbia University's president's office called him to apologize for the mistake.

Columbia administrators described Khalil as a principled, good-faith negotiator who worked with them to reduce encampments. In September 2024, after new demonstrations began on campus, Khalil said students would continue to protest as long as "Columbia continues to invest and to benefit from Israeli apartheid", and that this might include further encampments or other forms of protest.

On March 6, 2025, the Associated Press reported that Columbia University's newly created Office of Institutional Equity (OIE) had opened investigations of a number of students to address allegations that they had engaged in anti-Israel or antisemitic discrimination. Amy Greer, a lawyer advising several students, said that Columbia was bowing "to governmental pressure to suppress and chill protected speech".

The university's allegations against Khalil focused on his alleged involvement in the Columbia University Apartheid Divest coalition and his alleged role in circulating social media posts critical of Zionism and organizing what the university administration called an "unauthorized marching event", in which some participants purportedly glorified the October 7 attacks. Khalil told the Associated Press, "I have around 13 allegations against me. Most of them are social media posts that I had nothing to do with". Columbia threatened to block Khalil from graduating for refusing to sign a non-disclosure agreement but withdrew the threat after Khalil appealed through a lawyer.

==== Columbia University Apartheid Divest (CUAD) ====
Columbia University Apartheid Divest (CUAD) was a coalition of over 120 student organizations at Columbia University that formed after Columbia's administration irregularly banned chapters of Students for Justice in Palestine and Jewish Voice for Peace in November 2023. CUAD demanded that Columbia stop investing its $14.8 billion endowment in companies supporting Israel's government, dismantle a university outpost in Tel Aviv, and end collaboration with Israeli universities. In referendums, the student bodies at Columbia and affiliated Barnard College voted in favor of these initiatives by large margins.

=== Online campaign against Khalil ===
Prior to his arrest, Khalil was targeted by an online campaign to have him deported. Far-right Jewish group Betar US posted on Twitter in January 2025 that it had given his information to "multiple contacts" and that ICE was "aware of his home address and whereabouts". Canary Mission, a pro-Israel doxing website, also compiled a webpage about him. According to an email Khalil sent to Columbia president Katrina Armstrong on March 7, the campaign was led by Columbia affiliates Shai Davidai and David Lederer, who had labeled him a "security threat" and called for his deportation. The New York Times said that Davidai "called on Marco Rubio to deport Mr. Khalil". Khalil urged Armstrong and Columbia to "intervene and provide the necessary protections to prevent further harm" and asked for legal support for himself and other international students threatened with deportation.

After Khalil attended a protest at Barnard in early March 2025, Ross Glick, a pro-Israel activist involved with Betar US, met with aides to United States senators John Fetterman and Ted Cruz to discuss Khalil. According to Glick, the aides promised that their respective senators would "escalate" attention to Khalil.

According to Khalil's wife, he was subject to an "intense" campaign in the week before his arrest, when false claims were spread about him. The day before his detention, Khalil privately reported to Columbia officials incendiary statements that had inspired hateful responses and calls for his deportation, saying, "I haven't been able to sleep, fearing that ICE or a dangerous individual might come to my home". Zeteo reported that these included a "threatening post by the pro-Israel organization Betar in January" in which the group claimed "he said 'Zionists don't deserve to live'—a statement Khalil 'unequivocally' denied making". The quote came from a different student, who was expelled.

=== Trump administration actions ===
While campaigning for a second term as U.S. president, Trump consistently said he would cancel the visas of international students who take part in pro-Palestinian protests. At a rally on October 16, 2023, he said, "Under the Trump administration, we will revoke the student visas of radical, anti-American and antisemitic foreigners at our colleges and universities, and we will send them straight back home".

After taking office, Trump signed Executive Order 14188 on January 29, 2025. Among other things, the order singles out institutions of higher education and calls for the deportation of students with visas who have broken laws during any anti-Israel protest since the October 7 attacks.

On March 4, 2025, Trump said federal funding would stop for any school "that allows illegal protests", that "agitators" would be imprisoned or deported, and that American students would be expelled or arrested. The U.S. State Department said it would use artificial intelligence to review thousands of student visa holders' social media accounts as well as news reports of demonstrations to identify foreign nationals allegedly engaging in antisemitism as part of the new "catch and revoke" policy.

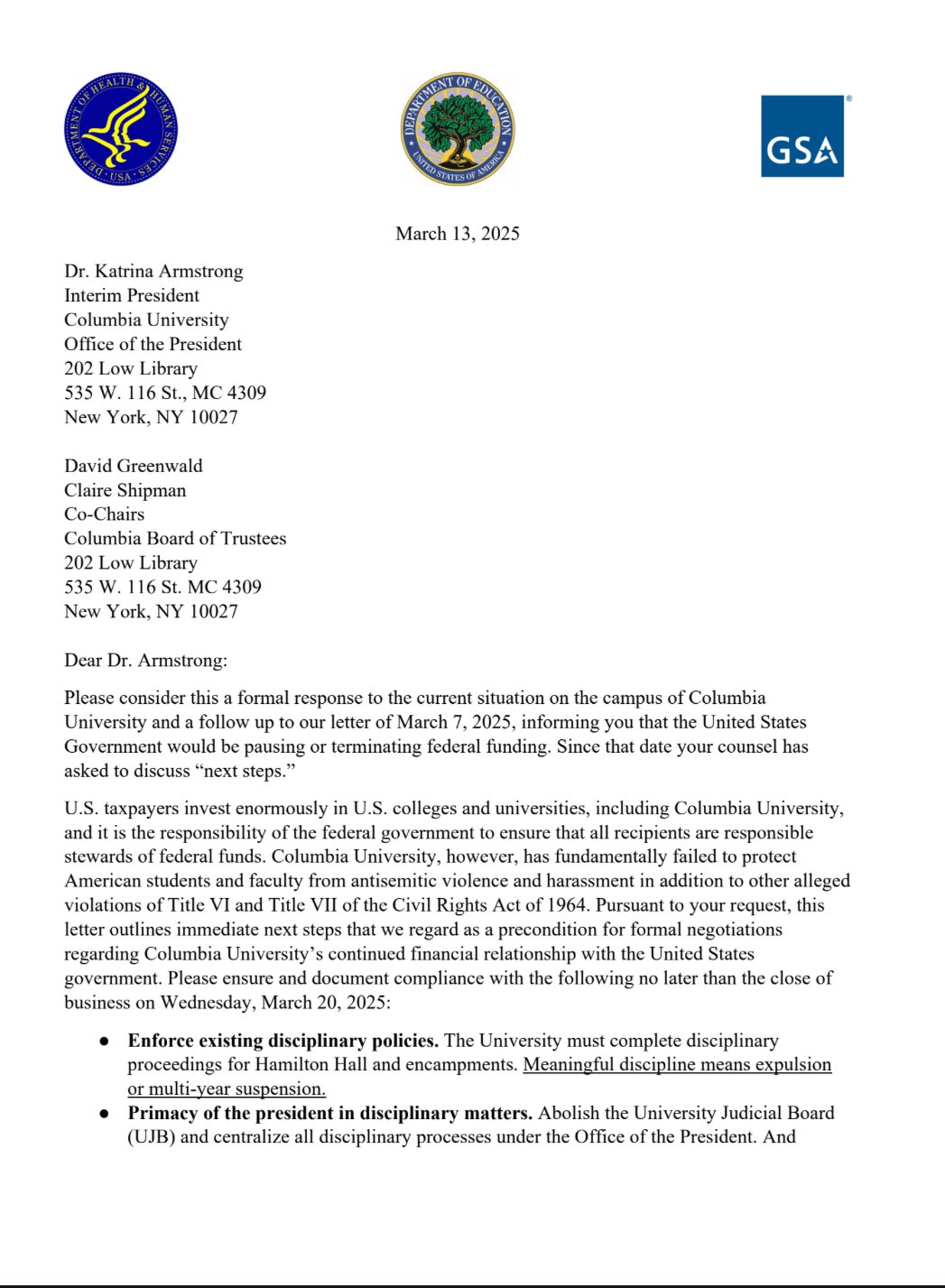
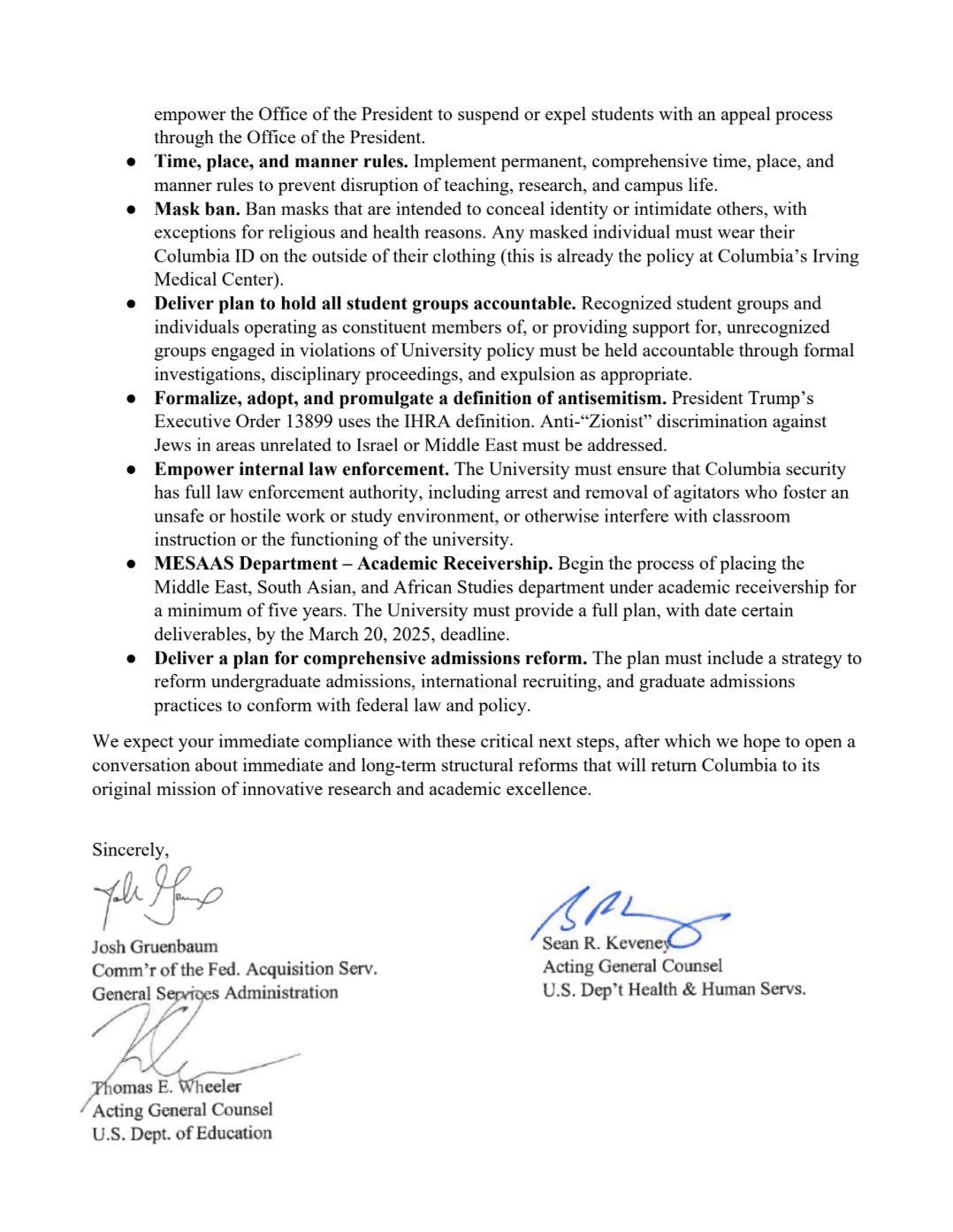
Letter dated March 13, 2025 to Columbia University interim president Katrina Armstrong and co-chairs of the board of trustees David Greenwald and Claire Shipman containing the Trump administration's list of demands.

Khalil's arrest occurred during a period of heightened federal scrutiny of Columbia University. The day before the arrest, the Trump administration canceled approximately $400 million in federal grants and contracts to Columbia, citing an alleged failure to protect Jewish students from antisemitic harassment on campus. Columbia said it was reviewing the government's actions and remained committed to combating antisemitism while ensuring its community's safety and well-being. The administration subsequently wrote to 60 other universities "under investigation for Title VI violations relating to antisemitic harassment and discrimination" to warn them of potential penalties.

On March 10, the White House's official social media accounts posted a taunting picture of Khalil with the caption "SHALOM, MAHMOUD". In a statement on March 11, Trump said of Khalil and other pro-Palestine protesters: "If you support terrorism, including the slaughtering of innocent men, women, and children, your presence is contrary to our national and foreign policy interests, and you are not welcome here", and "I think we ought to get them all out of the country. They're troublemakers, they're agitators, they don't love our country."

== Arrest and detention ==
At around 8:30 pm on March 8, multiple ICE officers took Khalil from the lobby of his apartment building in Columbia University housing. Khalil's wife, Noor Abdalla, said that when she and Khalil were returning home from an Iftar dinner, an ICE officer followed them into their building. The agent asked Khalil to confirm his identity, which he did. The officer told Khalil to give his wife the keys to their apartment so that she could go upstairs. When she refused to leave, the officer said, "I will arrest you, too". Abdalla retrieved Khalil's immigration paperwork from their apartment and gave it to an agent. She says the agent told someone on the phone, "This guy has a green card" but the person on the other end said to "bring him anyway".

Khalil called his lawyer, Amy Greer, from the building's lobby. She spoke over the phone with one of the agents, who told her they were acting on State Department orders to revoke Khalil's student visa. Greer said that when she told the agent Khalil was a permanent resident of the U.S. in possession of a green card, the agent responded that they would revoke the green card instead. Greer said the ICE agents told her they had a warrant. When Greer said she needed to see the warrant before Khalil could be detained, the agent hung up.

Abdalla said they were not shown a warrant and that "within minutes, they had handcuffed Mahmoud, took him out into the street and forced him into an unmarked car". A video of the arrest shows the agents refusing to give their names and ignoring Abdallah's requests that they identify the agency they represented or speak to Greer on the phone.

A Columbia spokesperson said law enforcement agents must produce a warrant before entering university property, but declined to say whether the university had received a warrant for the ICE agents to access Khalil's building. The spokesperson also declined to comment on the arrest.

During the trial of American Association of University Professors v. Rubio, Darren McCormack, a special agent with ICE's Homeland Security Investigations and the agent who oversaw Khalil's arrest, testified that the order to arrest him came from above, saying, "the Secretary of State and/or the White House had an interest in Mr. Khalil." McCormack added that he had been instructed to surveil Khalil before the arrest. According to Politico, "All four agents said they were never informed that the academics were being targeted for deportation due to their pro-Palestinian views, their criticism of Israel or for their political views—the central claim in the lawsuit."

=== Attempts to find Khalil after his arrest ===
On March 9, Greer said she was uncertain of Khalil's whereabouts, but that he could be as far away as Louisiana. Abdalla, who was eight months pregnant at the time, tried to find him at the immigration court at the Jacob K. Javits Federal Building in Manhattan, then at the Elizabeth Detention Center in New Jersey; according to court filings, officials would not tell her where he had been taken.

=== Transport to Louisiana ===
By the morning of March 10, ICE had transported Khalil to Louisiana, according to the ICE online system. He was detained at the LaSalle Detention Center, a private prison operated by the GEO Group in Jena, Louisiana. The decision to transport Khalil from New York to Louisiana—a state over 1,000 miles from his wife and legal team with courts seen as more conservative and friendlier to the Trump administration's deportations processes—has been criticized as forum shopping.

Khalil was kept in a large room that held about 70 men, and exchanged stories with them about their lives and how they came to be detained.

=== Rationale for detention ===
Court documents later revealed that the ICE agents did not have a warrant during Khalil's arrest, but had been notified by ICE Enforcement Removal Operations that a charge of removability "had been approved" by the Secretary of State. Attorneys for the government alleged that after Abdalla went to the apartment to retrieve his paperwork, Khalil was uncooperative and told the agents he would leave the scene. They alleged that the ICE agents thus had reason to believe he would escape, an exigent circumstance that allowed them to arrest Khalil inside the building lobby without a warrant. A Department of Homeland Security (DHS) official said, "When he tried to walk away, he was arrested. An administrative arrest warrant was executed at the time of his booking, as is the custom." A lawyer for Khalil said the government was "fatuously lying" and that there was "no reason they couldn't get a warrant".

Khalil later said he had felt like he was being kidnapped during his arrest, and that it reminded him of warrantless arrests by plainclothes officers he had seen carried out in Syria in response to political speech.

== Khalil's statements from detention ==
=== "Letter from a Palestinian Political Prisoner in Louisiana" ===
On March 18, 2025, a letter Khalil dictated to his family over the phone was released. In the letter, he identified himself as a Palestinian political prisoner. He said he was arrested because he exercised his right to free speech and "advocated for a free Palestine", and that the case against him was "part of a broader strategy to suppress dissent" by the Trump administration.

=== "A Letter to Columbia" ===
On April 4, 2025, the Columbia Daily Spectator, the university's student newspaper, published "A Letter to Columbia", an op-ed Khalil dictated over the phone from detention. In it, Khalil addresses the Columbia community, describing his detainment and the circumstances to it. He describes his detention by plainclothes officers as an abduction and the Trump administration's campaign against international students protesting in solidarity with Palestine as one of intimidation and kidnapping. He criticizes the Columbia trustees, writing: "Faced with a movement for divestment they couldn't crush, your trustees opted to set fire to the institution they're entrusted with." He encourages students and faculty who have not yet done so, or who have done so only performatively or superficially, to join the student movement and build on the momentum gained over the previous year, concluding: "History will redeem us, while those who were content to wait on the sidelines will be forever remembered for their silence."

=== "What does my detention by ICE say about America?" ===
On April 17, days after Louisiana immigration judge Jamee E. Comans declared Khalil deportable, The Washington Post published an op-ed by Khalil in which he criticized the Trump administration for eroding his rights and identified with some aspects of the experience Viktor Frankl describes in his 1946 book Man's Search for Meaning, such as "not knowing what fate awaits me; seeing resignation and defeat in my fellow detainees". Khalil criticized the "breakneck speed" with which his case is being heard and decided, saying that it is running "roughshod over due process".

=== "To my newborn son" ===
On Mother's Day, May 11, two weeks after his son was born, Khalil wrote an open letter to his son. He wrote of the government's cruelty in not allowing him to be with his wife for their son's birth, and of his love for their son. He also connected his absence to the cause of Palestinian liberation, saying that he would fight for his son and "for every Palestinian child whose life deserves safety, tenderness, and freedom".

== Legal proceedings ==
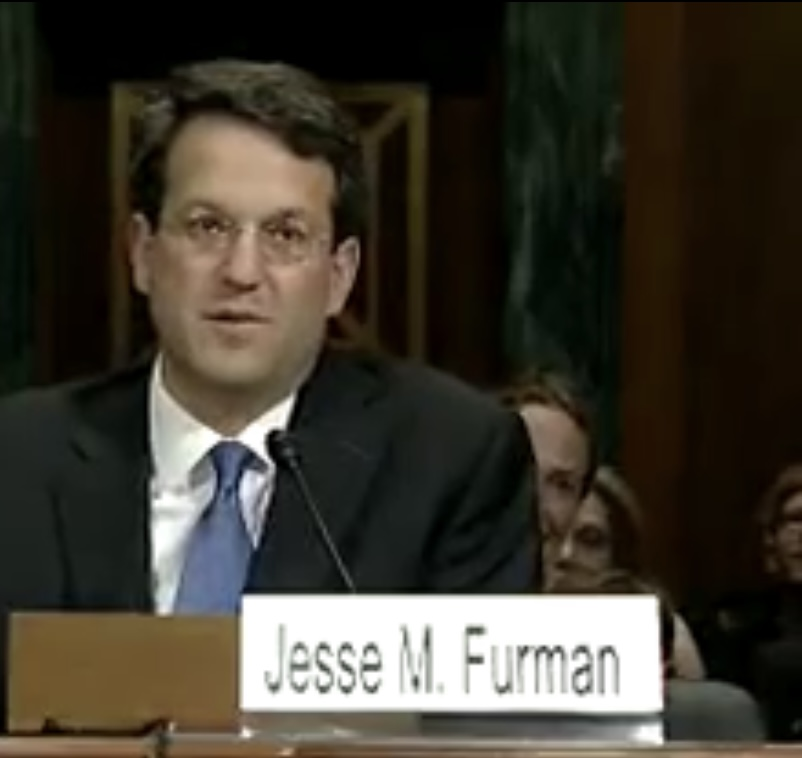
United States district judge Jesse Furman (pictured) granted a writ of habeas corpus on March 10.

Khalil has not been charged with a crime and is not alleged to have engaged in any activity legally prohibited to U.S. residents. Authorities have not alleged he provided material support to a proscribed organization. Removal procedures were initiated under section 237(a)(4)(C)(i) of the Immigration and Nationality Act of 1952, which permits deportation of aliens who are in the country legally if the Secretary of State believes their presence risks "potentially serious adverse foreign policy consequences". Khalil's attorneys have called this an "obscure" and "rarely used" section of the act. Two University of California professors analyzed public data for over 11 million immigration deportation cases, and found that this section had been used only 15 times prior to its use by the Trump administration.

=== Federal court system ===
==== Initial filings ====
According to the American Civil Liberties Union, Khalil's legal team is arguing that Khalil's "arrest and continued detention violate his constitutional rights, including rights to free speech and due process, and that they go beyond the government's legal authority."

Greer filed a petition for writ of habeas corpus in the Southern District of New York very early in the morning on March 9, and the next day Judge Jesse Furman ruled that Khalil could not be removed from the U.S. while the court assessed the case. At a March 12 hearing, the government argued for a change of venue to either New Jersey or Louisiana, where Khalil had been held in detention. His lawyers asked that he be returned to New York, but Khalil remained detained in Louisiana. After hearing that Khalil had not yet been able to have any private conversations with his attorneys, Furman ordered that he be allowed two privileged phone calls with them.

On March 13, attorneys for Khalil filed an amended petition for writ of habeas corpus, adding Trump, Rubio, and others as respondents. On March 19, Furman ruled that the case would be transferred to New Jersey, where Khalil was held in detention at the time the initial habeas corpus petition was filed. Later that day, the case was assigned to Judge Michael E. Farbiarz, who ordered sua sponte that the government not remove Khalil from the country pending further order of the court. Shortly after, the government filed additional allegations in that case, telling the court that Khalil had willfully failed to disclose material information when he applied for a green card in 2024: his internship with UNRWA, his having worked for the British embassy in Beirut beyond 2022, and his association with Columbia University Apartheid Divest.

On April 1, Farbiarz rejected the government's request to move the habeas corpus case to Louisiana or dismiss it. On April 29, Farbiarz ruled that he has jurisdiction over the motions submitted by Khalil's attorneys, including his free speech challenges and "an injunction vacating the secretary of state's determination" in his immigration court case. Khalil's attorneys said they would continue to seek bail and a preliminary injunction to release Khalil from custody while his immigration case proceeded. The next week, Farbiarz ordered the government to give him an annotated list of all previous instances in which it had used section 237(a)(4)(C)(i) or its predecessor as a basis for deportation. Meanwhile, the government petitioned the Court of Appeals for the Third Circuit for permission to appeal Farbiarz's order rejecting the government's request to move the case to Louisiana. On May 6, a three-judge panel consisting of Stephanos Bibas, Arianna Freeman, and Thomas Hardiman denied the petition.

==== Release from detention ====
On May 28, Farbiarz ruled that the section of the Immigration and Nationality Act under which the government sought to deport Khalil is likely unconstitutional, as it is too vague, and because an ordinary person probably would not know that it "could be used against him based on his speech inside the United States". He did not rule on whether the government's actions infringed on Khalil's First Amendment rights. He also rejected Khalil's request for a preliminary injunction, saying that Khalil's lawyers had not provided sufficient information in response to the government's assertion that he had failed to disclose material information when he applied for his green card. Farbiarz gave them additional time to address that charge.

On June 11, Farbiarz ruled that Khalil should be released from detention, though he paused the order for two days to enable the government to appeal his ruling. The government did not appeal, but argued against Khalil's motion for immediate release on the basis that allegations that Khalil lied on his green card application, which were not addressed by the previous ruling, authorized his continued detention. On June 13, Farbiarz ruled that there was insufficient evidence that Khalil's detention on those grounds was unlawful and suggested that the proper forum for Khalil's release was to seek bail from the immigration court in Louisiana. After a hearing on June 20, Farbiarz ordered that Khalil be released on bail. On June 21, Khalil was released and returned to New York, surrounded by supporters and Representative Alexandria Ocasio-Cortez at Newark International Airport.

The government petitioned the Third Circuit to stay the release order pending appeal. On July 30, the panel denied the request for a stay but set up a schedule for hearing the appeal. On October 16, federal judge Michael Hammer lifted Khalil's travel restrictions, allowing Khalil to travel across the U.S. for rallies and other events while released on bail. Hammer noted that Khalil was not considered a flight risk and had not violated any of his release conditions.

==== Appeals court ====
At an October 21, 2025, hearing before the Court of Appeals for the Third Circuit, the DOJ argued that the district court in New Jersey did not have the jurisdiction to order Khalil's release. In a 2–1 decision on January 15, 2026, the appeals court ruled in favor of the government. While it did not rule on the constitutionality of Khalil's deportation, the court decided that federal law required Khalil to move fully through the immigration court system before he could challenge his deportation in the federal court system. Khalil filed for an en banc rehearing in March, and on May 22, the court rejected the request in a 6–5 decision. Khalil then asked the appeals court to stay the issuance of a mandate directing Farbiarz to vacate his June ruling, to give him time to appeal to the Supreme Court.

==== Supreme Court ====
On October 19, 2026, Khalil appealed the Third Circuit's ruling to the Supreme Court.

=== Immigration court system ===
Matter of Khalil
- Court: LaSalle Immigration Court in Jena, Louisiana, Executive Office for Immigration Review
- Decided: April 11, 2025

Case history
- Appealed to: Board of Immigration Appeals

Court membership
- Judge sitting: Jamee E. Comans

Case opinions
- The United States can deport Khalil under section 237(a)(4)(C)(i) of the Immigration and Nationality Act of 1952.

April 2025 two-page memo from Marco Rubio

Page 2 of Rubio memo

Khalil also faced separate proceedings before an immigration judge in Louisiana. United States immigration judges are employees of the executive branch, not the judiciary, and thus do not address constitutional concerns. The judge, Assistant Chief Immigration Judge Jamee E. Comans, said she would focus only on whether Khalil could be removed from the United States under the law.

Khalil's first immigration court hearing was scheduled for March 27. Khalil instead appeared before the immigration judge on March 21, and at his lawyer's request, the judge postponed his hearing to April 8.

On April 8, Khalil had an immigration hearing at the LaSalle Immigration Court in Jena, Louisiana. At the hearing, Comans said she might order Khalil's release unless the government provided Khalil's lawyers with evidence that he was removable within 24 hours. She also set another hearing for April 11, giving Khalil's lawyers time to respond. During the hearing, a dozen allegations were levied against Khalil, including that he withheld information from the Department of Homeland Security about his alleged membership in CUAD, and that his "presence or activities in the United States would have serious adverse foreign policy consequences". Khalil's lawyer responded "deny" to each allegation.

On April 10, the government submitted a two-page memo from Rubio stating that Khalil's presence in the U.S. undermines "U.S. policy to combat anti-Semitism around the world and in the United States, in addition to efforts to protect Jewish students from harassment and violence in the United States". The memo did not allege that Khalil had done anything illegal. Instead, it stated that Khalil should be deported due to "past, current, or expected beliefs, statements, or associations that are otherwise lawful", citing Khalil's having taken part in "antisemitic protests and disruptive activities". Khalil's attorneys responded that he was being targeted for his speech, and said they would ask the judge to allow them to question Rubio about his claims. Comans denied the request, explaining that the court was "neither inclined or authorized" to compel such testimony.

On April 11, Comans ruled that Khalil is deportable under Rubio's assertion that his continued presence poses a risk of an "adverse foreign policy consequence". She said she had no authority to question that determination. She gave Khalil's lawyers a deadline of April 23 to file applications to stop his deportation and said she would file an order of removal to either Syria or Algeria if they failed to meet the deadline.

Khalil submitted an application for asylum as well as a motion to terminate based on Fourth Amendment violations. On April 24, the government rebutted the Fourth Amendment concerns by alleging Khalil was uncooperative and gave the ICE agents reason to believe he would escape, an exigent circumstance that allowed them to arrest Khalil at his apartment building without a warrant. A lawyer for Khalil said in a statement that it was "outrageous" the government had "tried to assert to the immigration judge—and the world—in their initial filing of the arrest report that there was an arrest warrant when there was none." On May 22, Comans ruled against the Fourth Amendment challenge and held a hearing to consider Khalil's request for asylum and for withholding of removal to Syria and Algeria. Both Khalil and expert witnesses testified that the publicity the case had received would make him a target if he were deported. His lawyer also "submitted over 600 pages of documents, declarations and expert analyses" in support of the claim. Comans set a June 2 deadline for both sides to submit written closing statements.

On September 12, Comans ruled that Khalil was deportable to Syria or Algeria on the basis that he "willfully misrepresented" information about being a member of several organizations when he applied for his green card. Khalil's attorneys appealed the decision, and his case was forwarded to the Board of Immigration Appeals. If the BIA upholds Comans's decision, Khalil may appeal once more to the Fifth Circuit.

In April 2026, the Board of Immigration Appeals issued a final administrative removal order.

=== Legal representation ===
In addition to Amy Greer, Khalil's legal representation in his habeas corpus case includes attorneys from the American Civil Liberties Union, Creating Law Enforcement Accountability & Responsibility (CLEAR), and the Center for Constitutional Rights. CLEAR is a legal aid group at the City University of New York (CUNY) School of Law. His lawyers are seeking his release while the federal and immigration court cases continue; the government opposes this. He is represented by Marc Van Der Hout and Johnny Sinodis in his immigration case in Louisiana.

=== Government statements ===
Government officials have informally accused Khalil of leading "activities aligned to Hamas". The government has not publicly provided any evidence of this claim, which Khalil denies. His attorneys have called it "false and preposterous". White House press secretary Karoline Leavitt also alleged Khalil distributed flyers with a Hamas logo; as of mid-March, neither Leavitt nor ICE had publicly provided proof of the existence of such flyers, though Leavitt said the flyers were being stored on or inside her desk. Khalil's lawyers deny that he distributed such flyers.

The Trump administration defended its actions, with Secretary of State Marco Rubio announcing plans to revoke more people's visas or green cards.

DHS deputy secretary Troy Edgar defended the detention. When asked to explain what conduct merited Khalil's removal from the U.S., and specifically how Khalil had supported Hamas, Edgar said, "I think if he would have declared he's a terrorist, we would have never let him in", repeatedly referring to Khalil as a visa-holder despite having been corrected that he is a legal permanent resident. ICE executive associate director for enforcement and removal operations Tom Homan said Khalil is a national security threat.

An NBC News analysis of documents related to the case found that the government relied on unverified tabloid journalism and made "clearly erroneous" claims about Khalil's work history.

=== Legal analysis ===
Section 237(a)(4)(C)(i) of the Cold War-era Immigration and Nationality Act of 1952 (INA) provides that a foreign national can be deported if the Secretary of State believes their presence risks "potentially serious adverse foreign policy consequences".

In Massieu v. Reno (1996), the most recent case to address this provision of the INA, U.S. district court Judge Maryanne Trump Barry found it unconstitutional. (Note: Section 237 was initially numbered 241.) She ruled that it violated due process by denying aliens a meaningful opportunity to challenge charges, was unconstitutionally vague by failing to clearly define prohibited conduct, and unconstitutionally delegated "wholly unguided and unreviewable discretion" over deportations to the Secretary of State. The Third Circuit Court of Appeals later reversed Barry's decision without addressing the constitutionality question, ruling that the alien must exhaust the immigration court process before seeking relief in district court.

In Matter of Ruiz-Massieu (1999), the U.S. Board of Immigration Appeals (BIA) ruled that the Secretary of State's determination of deportability under the statute is presumptively valid if it is "facially reasonable" and based on a bona fide foreign policy concern; as an immigration court, the board could not address the statute's constitutionality. Immigration courts are part of the Department of Justice, and BIA rulings can be appealed to a circuit court of appeals, in particular when a case raises a matter of law or constitutionality. The BIA decision noted that Congress created a higher standard for deportation if the basis for deporting the alien is "solely on the grounds of beliefs, statements, or associations which would be lawful if performed within the United States". In such cases, the Secretary must determine that the defendant's presence would damage a "compelling" U.S. foreign policy interest, a higher standard than deportation based merely on the person's presence itself.

Just Security wrote that in Bridges v. Wixon (1945), the Supreme Court protected Australian union organizer Harry Bridges from being deported for his pro-labor speech, holding that the First Amendment was applicable to aliens. In Harisiades v. Shaughnessy (1952), the Supreme Court allowed deportations of aliens involved in communist groups, though it read First Amendment protections narrowly instead of rejecting their applicability. The court has never recanted its statement that the First Amendment protects aliens. Citing these cases, Nadine Strossen said that the constitutional issues relating to immigrants' First Amendment rights are complex and not easily resolvable in cases like Khalil's. Ilya Somin argued that the First Amendment was intended to limit government's conduct rather than to grant a right to a special class (such as citizens or green card holders).

Five free speech groups—Foundation for Individual Rights and Expression, The Rutherford Institute, the First Amendment Lawyers Association, the National Coalition Against Censorship, and PEN America—filed an amicus brief arguing that the law under which the Trump administration is attempting to deport Khalil is unconstitutional and asking for a preliminary injunction. Over 150 immigration law scholars filed another amicus brief calling Rubio's use of this section of the INA "unprecedented".

Greg Chen and Amy Grenier of the American Immigration Lawyers Association have noted that use of this section of the INA requires Rubio to notify Congress of the "facially reasonable and bona fide reasons" that someone is a security threat.

=== Lawsuits involving Khalil ===
On March 13, 2025, the New York chapter of the Council on American–Islamic Relations said it was suing Columbia and the House of Representatives Committee on Education and Workforce on grounds related to Columbia's sharing of student records with the committee. The suit was filed on behalf of Khalil and several other students. On March 20, Judge Arun Subramanian enjoined Columbia from sharing any records, pending a hearing.

On March 24, 2025, several victims of the October 7 attacks filed a civil suit against four organizations associated with the pro-Palestinian protests at Columbia: Within Our Lifetime – United for Palestine, Columbia Students for Justice in Palestine, Columbia–Barnard Jewish Voice for Peace, and Columbia University Apartheid Divest. Several students described as the organizations' leaders, including Khalil, were named as defendants. The suit alleges that the defendants violated US antiterrorism law and the law of nations by coordinating with Hamas. A National Jewish Advocacy Center attorney denied that the deportation order had influenced the lawsuit's timing.

On July 7, 2025, Khalil filed a $20 million claim against the Trump administration under the Federal Tort Claims Act, alleging "false arrest and imprisonment, malicious prosecution, [and] intentional infliction of emotional distress" intended to punish his speech. The Center for Constitutional Rights, which represents him, said that if he wins the suit, he will use the money to support other immigrants against whom the administration has taken similar action and that an "official apology and abandonment of the administration's unconstitutional policy" would be an acceptable alternative. DHS Assistant Secretary Tricia McLaughlin rejected the allegations and condemned Khalil as antisemitic.

On July 14, Khalil filed suit in the District Court for the Southern District of New York alleging that, in violation of the Ku Klux Klan Act, federal officials in the Trump administration conspired with the private pro-Israel agencies Canary Mission, Betar US, and the Heritage Foundation to "single out Mr. Khalil and other non-citizen Palestinians and their supporters for arrest, detention, and deportation, as punishment for their support of Palestinian rights". The lawsuit cites Project Esther and names Secretary of State Marco Rubio, White House Deputy Chief of Staff for Policy Stephen Miller, former Secretary of Homeland Security Kristi Noem, and acting Attorney General Todd Blanche.

== Reactions ==
=== Columbia administration ===
External videos
- Columbia University students chant "Free Mahmoud" during commencement ceremony speech by Claire Shipman

Interim president of Columbia University Katrina Armstrong did not publicly name Khalil or mention his arrest. Especially after the detention of Palestinian Columbia student Mohsen Mahdawi, critics of the silence of the university's leadership pointed to Tufts University's support and backing of its doctoral student Rümeysa Öztürk, whom plainclothes DHS agents apprehended off the street in Somerville, Massachusetts. Some students called Columbia's silence an example of the Palestine exception. On April 28, 2025—51 days after federal agents apprehended Khalil—Columbia's acting president Claire Shipman, formerly co-chair of the board of trustees, first publicly acknowledged Khalil and Mahdawi by name in a university-wide email focusing on expansions to the International Students and Scholars Office.

During commencement ceremonies, Shipman was jeered and booed by the crowd, which chanted "free Mahmoud" and "free Palestine". She acknowledged that "many in our community today are mourning the absence of our graduate Mahmoud Khalil".

=== Individuals and organizations ===
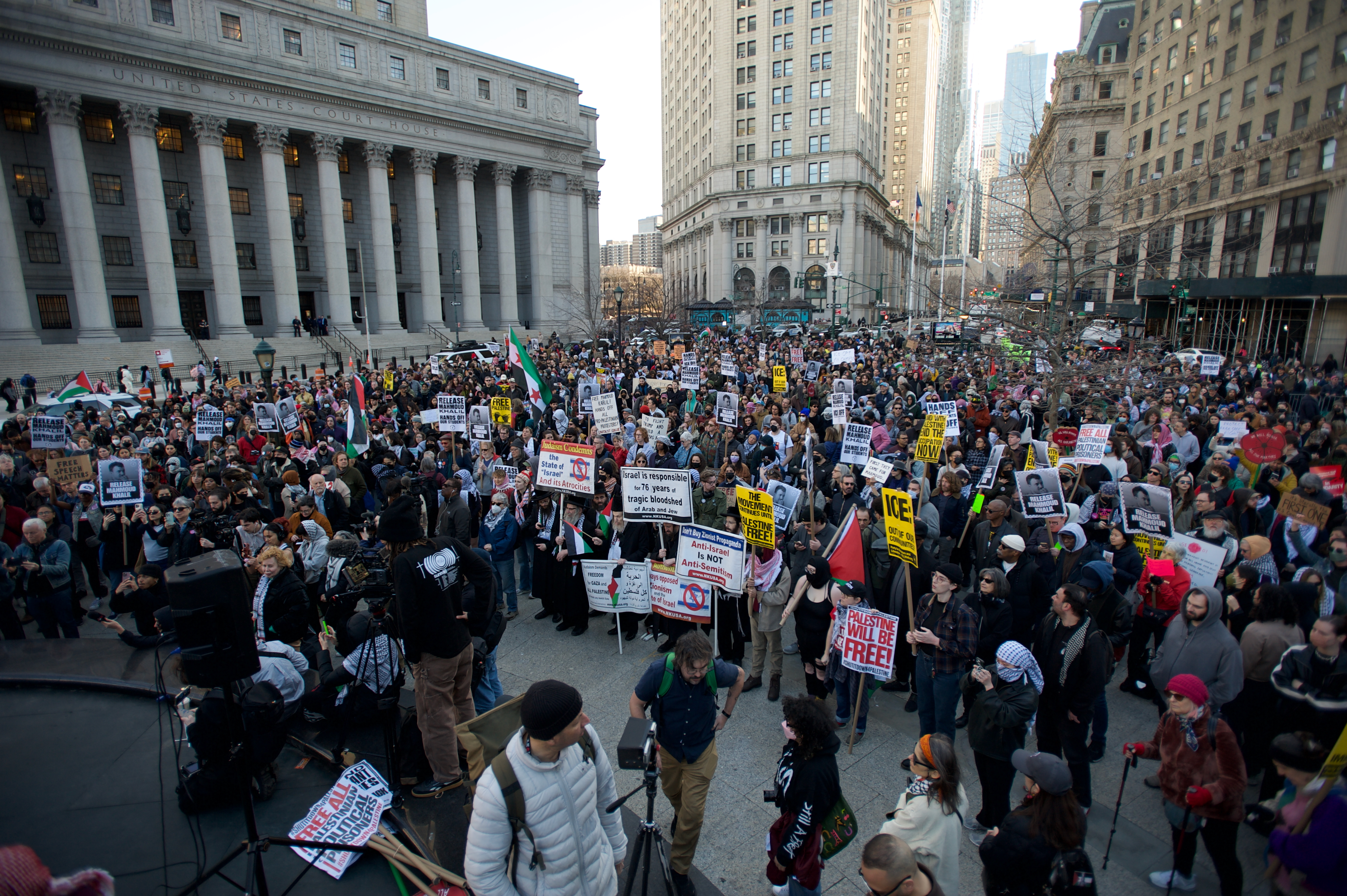
Protesters against Khalil's detention in New York City

Khalil's arrest was criticized by groups such as the Foundation for Individual Rights and Expression, Amnesty International, the American Civil Liberties Union, the California Faculty Association, the First Amendment Coalition, the Center for Constitutional Rights, and Writers Against the War on Gaza; and individuals including Michael Thaddeus, Zohran Mamdani, Brad Lander, Ben Burgis, Katherine Franke, Jameel Jaffer, Sonja West, Robby Soave, and Charlie Pierce.

Some conservatives who support the Trump administration's broader deportation plans expressed unease at Khalil's arrest. Conservative commentator Ann Coulter indicated concern about the arrest's constitutionality; Matthew Bartlett—a Republican strategist and State Department advisor during the first presidency of Donald Trump—expressed apprehension at the apparent contradiction with JD Vance's advocacy for freedom of speech; and The American Conservative editor Andrew Day wrote that, while Khalil should not have been admitted to the U.S. in the first place, upon arrival he "obtained the right to protest and express his political views". Journalist Mona Charen opined similarly. Former Trump adviser Mercedes Schlapp expressed support for Khalil's arrest and said U.S. Representative Rashida Tlaib should be deported, though Tlaib is a natural-born U.S. citizen from Detroit. Political commentator Ben Shapiro also signaled support for Khalil's deportation.

After Khalil's arrest, demonstrations protesting his detention were held in New York City, and within a few days, an online petition calling for his release had received more than three million signatures. Other rallies were held at Federal Plaza in Chicago and at Stanford University.

Foundation for Individual Rights and Expression legal director Will Creeley called DHS deputy secretary Troy Edgar's NPR interview defending Khalil's detention "stunning" and said his "conflation of protest and terrorism stopped me cold". Washington Post columnist Shadi Hamid wrote that the interview was the latest confirmation from the Trump administration that "Khalil's arrest has no basis". In The Nation, Dima Khalidi described the administration's actions as McCarthyist red-baiting that weaponize antisemitism.

=== Ethnic and religion-based organizations ===
==== Arab and Muslim Americans ====
The Council on American-Islamic Relations, the American-Arab Anti-Discrimination Committee, the Arab American Institute criticized the arrest.

==== Jewish Americans ====
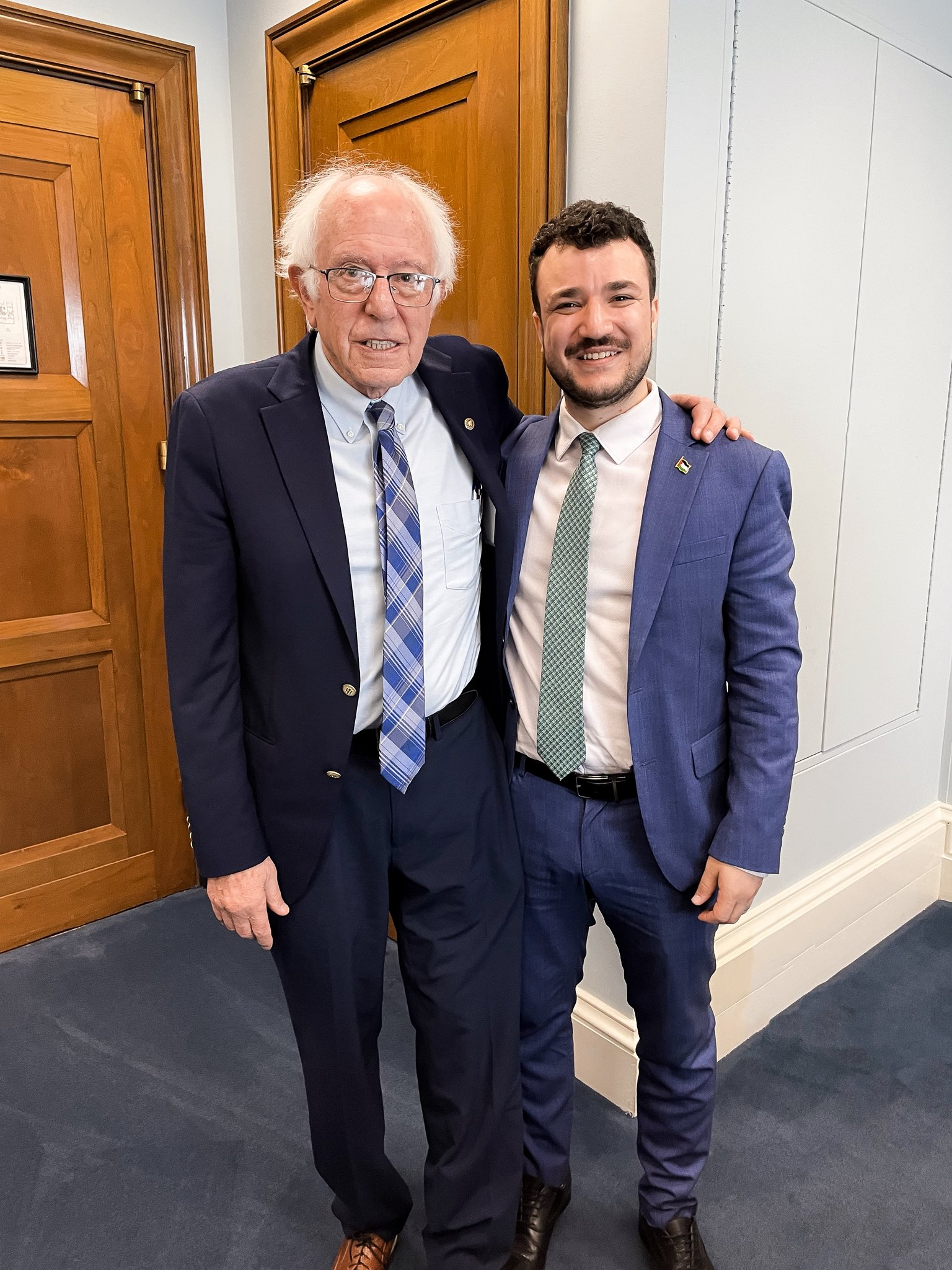
Khalil with US Senator Bernie Sanders following Khalil's release from custody, 22 July 2025.

According to the Jewish Telegraphic Agency (JTA), Khalil's detention "divided Jews"; an unscientific survey of its readers found a "slight majority" supported Khalil's deportation. Jewish Currents reported that Jewish American organizations were split on the question: "mainstream groups have remained silent, and liberal Zionist and anti-Zionist Jewish organizations have sharply condemned it".

Jewish members of the Columbia University faculty protested Khalil's arrest on campus on March 10, and several Jewish groups expressed concern about or opposition to his detention, including J Street, Jewish Voice for Peace, the Jewish Council for Public Affairs, Jews for Racial and Economic Justice, IfNotNow, and Bend the Arc. These concerns were echoed by several Jewish individuals, including Jonathan Jacoby, Erwin Chemerinsky, Noah Feldman, and Jill Stein. More than one of the groups said the Trump administration was using antisemitism as an excuse for an authoritarian agenda. Jewish Voice for Peace organized a sit-in at Trump Tower in Manhattan on March 13 during which protesters chanted "Free Mahmoud Khalil". About 300 protesters participated, and almost 100 were arrested.

In an op-ed for The Free Press, Alan Dershowitz criticized public support given to Khalil's views while also calling for civil liberty groups to "defend his First Amendment right not to be punished (in this case deported)".

The Anti-Defamation League (ADL), the Orthodox Union, and Betar US praised Khalil's arrest as an effort to stop antisemitism on college campuses. The ADL said his detention "illustrates [the Trump administration's] resolve by holding alleged perpetrators responsible for their actions", but that any immigration status actions must follow due process.

=== Elected officials ===
On March 11, 14 House Democrats wrote to Secretary of Homeland Security Kristi Noem calling Khalil's arrest and detention an "illegal abduction" and demanding his release. Other congressional Democrats spoke out individually, including Senators Dick Durbin, Chris Murphy, and Chuck Schumer and Representatives Alexandria Ocasio-Cortez, Jerry Nadler, and Jamie Raskin. On March 14, over 100 House Democrats sent Noem and Rubio a letter saying that the attempt to punish Khalil for his speech evoked McCarthyism and "is the playbook of authoritarians" and asking that the administration respond to specific questions about its use of the 1952 Immigration and Nationality Act (INA). This was followed by another letter to Noem and Rubio from eight Democratic senators on March 21, noting in part that the INA required Rubio to notify Congress of his specific reasons for believing that Khalil's lawful residency posed a serious threat to foreign policy.

Twenty congressional Republicans gave statements to the Washington Reporter, lauding the Trump administration's effort to deport people they see as terrorist sympathizers. House Speaker Mike Johnson called Khalil a "mastermind" of the protests at Columbia and encouraged the revocation of student visas.

Attorney General of New York Letitia James said she was "extremely concerned about the arrest" and her office was "monitoring the situation". New York Governor Kathy Hochul and New York City Mayor Eric Adams declined to opine on the arrests. Adams complained that the level of public support expressed for Khalil eclipsed the level of support he (Adams) received after his own arrest on bribery and wire fraud charges.

== See also ==
- Visa and deportation controversies in the second Trump administration – Use of immigration procedures to target political dissidents residing in the US
- Deportation of Kilmar Ábrego García – 2025 US extrajudicial deportation
- Deportation of Rasha Alawieh – Lebanese nephrologist deported by US CBP
- Detention of Mohsen Mahdawi – 2025 arrest of Palestinian student in U.S.
- Detention of Rümeysa Öztürk – 2025 arrest in Massachusetts
- Immigration policy of the second Trump administration
- Michel Shehadeh – Arrested in 1987 under the Immigration and Nationality Act of 1952 on the basis of alleged support for the Popular Front for the Liberation of Palestine, with charges dismissed two decades later.
- Reactions to the 2024 pro-Palestinian protests on university campuses
