= Students' Civil Liberties Union =

Student organization in California, US

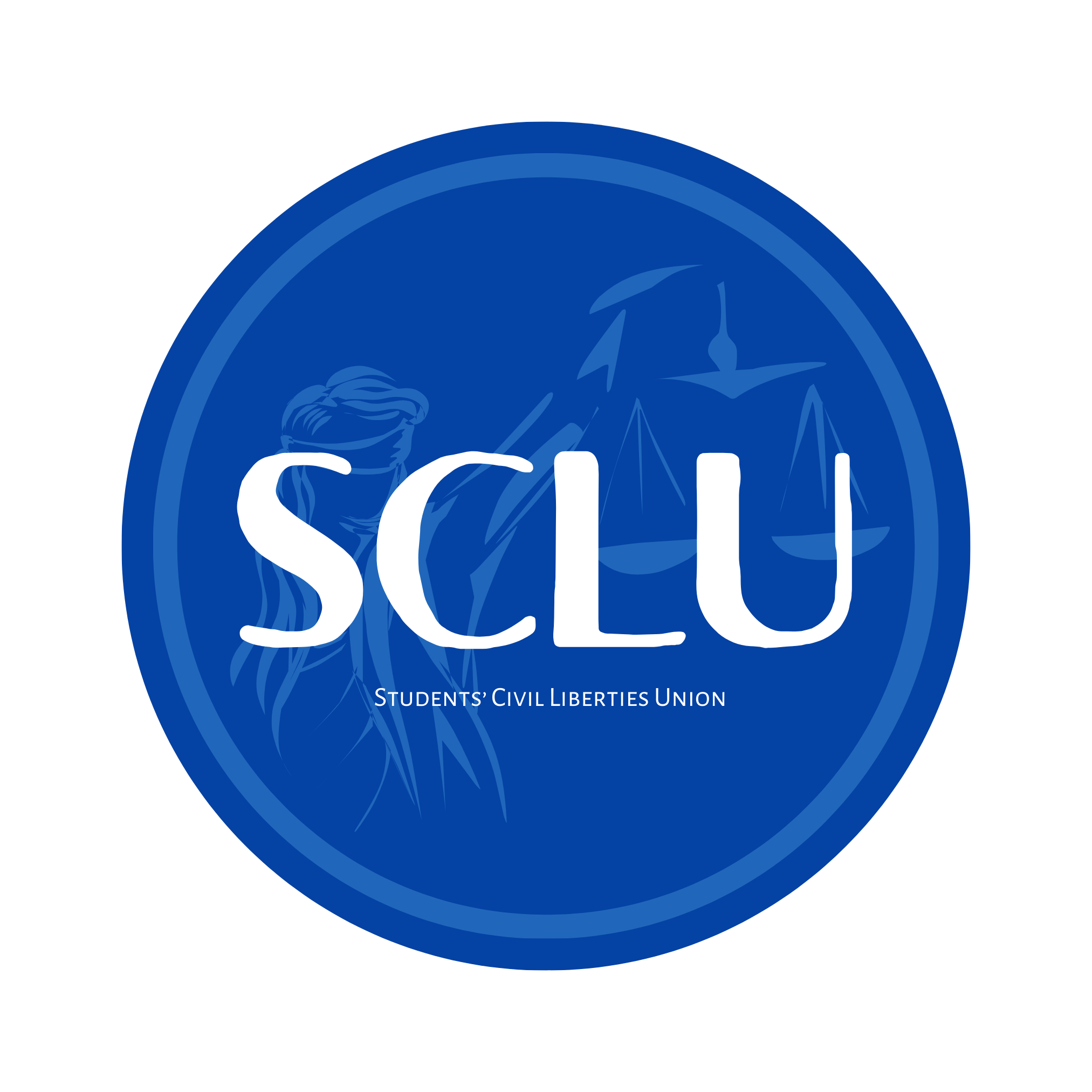
- Formation: May 6, 2024; 2 years ago
- Founders: Aryan Dixit; Daniel Alejandro Soria; Jasmine Lee; Dannie Zhu
- Type: Nonprofit
- Purpose: Youth organizing in San Diego
- Executive Director: Aryan Dixit
- Board President: Kevin Veno
- Website: sclusd.org

The Students' Civil Liberties Union (SCLU) San Diego is a student-led nonprofit and advocacy organization based out of UC San Diego, California. According to its official website, SCLU's mission is to "champion civil liberties and amplify the concerns of students," with a current emphasis on immigrant and disabled student rights. The organization is most known for its work in the San Diego region in immigrant advocacy through protests and campaigns.

== History ==
SCLU appeared in campus media in February 2025, as KPBS reported that the organization participated in a protest calling for UC San Diego to support undocumented students and to divest from corporations affiliated with immigration enforcement.

In April 2025, a wave of visa revocations for international students occurred at UC San Diego. On April 4, UC San Diego administrators announced that five international students had their F-1 visas suddenly terminated, and a sixth was detained at the border, denied entry and deported. By April 16, administrators confirmed this number had risen to 36.

Responding to these visa terminations, SCLU helped organize campus-wide actions. On April 9, students rallied in front of Geisel Library to protest these changes as well.

SCLU successfully organized for the creation of the Disability Resource Hub at UC San Diego, to be opened in late 2026.

== Immigrant Rights Advocacy ==
SCLU has worked toward stronger protections for international and undocumented students since February of 2025. The organization has organized protests, rallies and campus-wide actions at UC San Diego and in the San Diego County regarding the creation of a sanctuary campus and sanctuary spaces throughout the county of San Diego.

In October 2025, SCLU launched Detention Free San Diego at the Asian-American Pacific Islanders Democratic Club of San Diego's panel on Immigration to organize businesses and schools to designate private locations within their premises as sanctuaries. On February 27, 2026, the Civil Liberties Enforcement and Accountability Rules Ordinance went into effect after being passed by the San Diego County Board of Supervisors with pressure from groups including SCLU, which held a press conference regarding the Ordinance on Jan 13, 2026.

In February 2026, SCLU entered a protracted campaign to end UC San Diego Police Department's prolonged collaboration with the United States Customs and Border Protection under Operation Stonegarden. SCLU alongside the San Diego Chicano/Latino Concilio on Higher Education pushed the University to exit and terminate their contract which was successful.

== Disability Resource Hub ==
In 2025, the SCLU, in coalition with the Blind Snakes Co-operative, launched a campaign for the establishment of a centralized Disability Resource Hub at UC San Diego. The advocacy was part of a broader effort to move the university from a "medical model" of disability management toward a "social model" that recognizes disability as a cultural identity.

Through public testimony and legislative lobbying within the Associated Students Senate, SCLU & Blind Snakes members, identified institutional barriers such as "quarterly reverification" processes and campus infrastructure gaps. The campaign successfully secured $14,000 in transitional funding to establish a permanent space intended to maintain institutional memory for disabled student advocacy. The initiative resulted in the allocation of a permanent location for the Disability Resource Hub in Pepper Canyon Hall, scheduled to open in Fall 2026.
