= Mahmoud Khalil =

Algerian-Palestinian activist (born 1995)

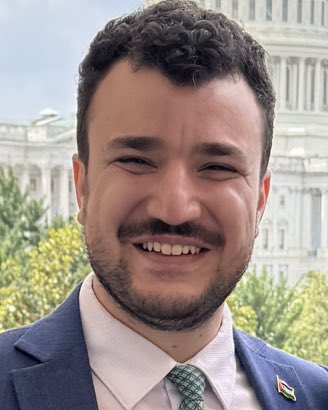
- Khalil in July 2025
- Born: 1995 (age 30–31); Damascus, Syria
- Education: Lebanese American University, Beirut (BS); Columbia University (MPA)
- Known for: Negotiating with Columbia’s administration during the Gaza Solidarity Encampment and broader protests during the Gaza war; ICE detention
- Spouse: Noor Abdalla (m. 2023)
- Children: 1

Mahmoud Khalil (Arabic: محمود خليل, romanized: Maḥmūd Khalīl; born 1995) is an Algerian-Palestinian activist known for his role as a negotiator and spokesperson in the 2024 Gaza Solidarity Encampment and broader protests in solidarity with Palestine at Columbia University during the Gaza war and genocide while he was a graduate student at Columbia's School of International and Public Affairs, and for his detention by US Immigration and Customs Enforcement (ICE) from March 8 to June 20, 2025 (104 days), under the second presidency of Donald Trump. Khalil was detained without being accused of a crime.

In September 2026, he published his memoir, No Land to Stand On: Notes from Detention.

== Early life ==
Khalil was born in 1995 to Palestinian parents in a refugee camp in Syria. His mother has Algerian ancestors who migrated to Palestine during the Ottoman Empire, which is how Khalil holds Algerian citizenship. He organized protests against the Assad regime during the Syrian revolution, but fled Syria for Lebanon in 2013 after two of his friends were detained. In his memoir No Land to Stand On, he writes that, as a teenager, he was shot in the leg by Assad's security forces. In Lebanon, he worked for the United Kingdom's Foreign Office, where he managed part of its Chevening Scholarship program.

Khalil completed his bachelor's degree in computer science at Lebanese American University in Beirut before enrolling in Columbia University's School of International and Public Affairs, where he earned his Master of Public Administration in development practice in December 2024. Earlier that year, he was granted lawful permanent resident status in the United States.

== Activism ==
In April 2024, Khalil represented the Gaza Solidarity Encampment as a negotiator and spokesperson. The encampment, as well as the broader Columbia protests in solidarity with the Palestinians of Gaza, demanded that the university officially call for an end to the Gaza war and genocide and divest from Israel, especially from companies whose products, services, or infrastructure it has extensively used in its military operations in Gaza. The negotiations lasted from April 19 to April 29, when University President Minouche Shafik announced the end of negotiations and that Columbia would "not divest from Israel". According to the Columbia Daily Spectator, Columbia's leadership did not reveal the chain of command outside the negotiation room and "positioned key administrators to be the public face for negotiations and kept others within University leadership, including the trustees, away from the conversation" so that "the protesters never came into direct dialogue with those empowered to answer their demands".

Khalil was not arrested during the protests, nor was he accused of participating in actions such as the Hind's Hall occupation of Hamilton Hall.

Khalil said Columbia accused him of misconduct in December 2024, weeks before his graduation. He said, "I have around 13 allegations against me, most of them are social media posts that I had nothing to do with." Khalil said that, when he refused to sign a non-disclosure agreement, Columbia required him to sign before he could see the case evidence, placed a hold on his transcript, and threatened to block him from graduating. He said Columbia backed down after he appealed with a lawyer.

On September 21, 2025, Khalil addressed hundreds at a Voices for Gaza fundraising event with Mosab Abu Toha, Aasif Mandvi, Hannah Lillith Assadi, Hala Alyan, and Viet Thanh Nguyen. The New York Times Book Review called his 2026 memoir, No Land to Stand On: Notes From Detention, "a frightening, important book" that includes "a measure of hope".

== Attempted deportation and litigation ==
=== Background ===
==== Online campaign against Khalil ====
Before his detention, Khalil was targeted by an online campaign seeking to have him deported. In January 2025, the far-right Zionist group Betar US posted on Twitter that it had given his information to "multiple contacts" and that ICE was "aware of his home address and whereabouts". Canary Mission, a pro-Israel doxing website, also compiled a webpage about him. According to an email Khalil sent to Columbia president Katrina Armstrong on March 7, the campaign was led by Columbia affiliates Shai Davidai and David Lederer, who had labeled him a "security threat" and called for his deportation. The New York Times said that Davidai "called on Marco Rubio to deport Mr. Khalil". Khalil urged Armstrong and Columbia to "intervene and provide the necessary protections to prevent further harm" and asked for legal support for himself and other international students threatened with deportation.

==== Federal funding cut to Columbia ====
The day before the arrest, the Trump administration canceled approximately $400 million in federal grants and contracts to Columbia, citing an alleged failure to protect Jewish students from antisemitic harassment on campus.

==== Federal surveillance ====
During the trial of American Association of University Professors v. Rubio, Darren McCormack, a special agent with ICE's Homeland Security Investigations and the agent who oversaw Khalil's arrest, testified that the order to arrest him came from above, saying, "the Secretary of State and/or the White House had an interest in Mr. Khalil." McCormack added that he had been instructed to surveil Khalil before the arrest. According to Politico, "All four agents said they were never informed that the academics were being targeted for deportation due to their pro-Palestinian views, their criticism of Israel or for their political views—the central claim in the lawsuit."

=== ICE detention and release ===
On March 8, 2025, plainclothes ICE agents apprehended Khalil at his Columbia University-owned residential building in Morningside Heights without a warrant, citing the Immigration and Nationality Act Section 287(g). The US government, via Secretary of State Marco Rubio, claimed his activism harmed US foreign policy. Khalil was not charged with a crime or alleged to have engaged in any activity legally prohibited to US residents. Later in March, the government alleged that Khalil had lied on his green card application. His wife, who was eight months pregnant, tried to find him at the immigration court at the Jacob K. Javits Federal Building in Manhattan and then at the Elizabeth Detention Center in New Jersey; according to court filings, officials would not tell her where he had been taken.

By the morning of March 10, ICE had transported Khalil to Louisiana, according to the ICE online system. He was detained for 104 days at the LaSalle Detention Center in Jena, Louisiana—over 1,000 miles (1,600 km) from his wife and legal team. His arrest sparked protests in New York City, Washington, D.C., and San Francisco, with support from figures like US Representative Alexandria Ocasio-Cortez, who called the arrest politically motivated. On April 28, Columbia first publicly acknowledged Khalil and Mohsen Mahdawi by name in a university-wide email focusing on expansions to the International Students and Scholars Office.

Khalil completed the requirements for his Columbia degree before being detained, but was incarcerated during the graduation ceremony. His wife participated in an unofficial "People's Commencement" ceremony at Church of St. Paul and St. Andrew on his behalf. At Columbia's official commencement ceremony, Claire Shipman, acting university president and former co-chair of the board of trustees, was booed and jeered during her remarks with chants of "free Mahmoud" and "free Palestine".

On June 11, 2025, federal judge Michael E. Farbiarz ruled Khalil’s detention unconstitutional, noting he was neither a flight risk nor a community threat. Khalil was released on June 20, 2025, after a court found the government’s case relied on unverified tabloid reports. His case drew attention as part of a broader Trump administration effort to deport pro-Palestinian student activists.

In July 2025, Khalil filed a claim for $20 million in damages against the Trump administration.

The second Trump administration appealed Farbiarz's ruling. It argued that such decisions should be made by immigration courts, not federal courts, and hence that Farbiarz did not have jurisdiction over the case. On January 15, 2026, a three-judge panel of the United States Court of Appeals for the Third Circuit in Philadelphia ruled 2–1 in favor of Trump and instructed the lower court to dismiss Khalil's habeas corpus petition. On October 19, 2026, Khalil appealed to the Supreme Court.

=== Deportation order from Louisiana judge ===
On September 17, 2025, Jamee Comans, an immigration judge in Louisiana, ordered Khalil to be deported to either Syria or Algeria. Khalil’s lawyers suggested intention to appeal the deportation order. 108 current and former professors at Columbia and Barnard signed an amicus brief in support of Khalil's appeal of the deportation order.

=== Khalil v. The Heritage Foundation et al. ===
On July 14, 2026 Khalil filed a lawsuit in the District Court for the Southern District of New York alleging that, in violation of the Ku Klux Klan Act, federal officials in the Trump administration entered into a conspiracy with groups including the Heritage Foundation, Canary Mission, and Betar to "single out Mr. Khalil and other non-citizen Palestinians and their supporters for arrest, detention, and deportation, as punishment for their support of Palestinian rights."

== No Land to Stand On: Notes from Detention ==
On September 29, 2026, Khalil's memoir, No Land to Stand On: Notes from Detention was published by the Metropolitan Books imprint of Henry Holt and Company.

The memoir covers his ICE detention in detail, including being taken by ICE agents from his residence in March 2025, his detention at LaSalle Detention Center in Jena, Louisiana, and his legal battles. It also covers his interactions with Columbia's administration during the Gaza Solidarity Encampment (April 17–30, 2024) and broader protests calling on Columbia to divest from Israel amid the Gaza genocide. These accounts are interspersed with stories from his personal life and background, including his upbringing under the Assad regime in Syria.

== Views ==
Khalil identified himself as a Palestinian political prisoner arrested because he exercised his right to free speech and "advocated for a free Palestine" and said the case against him was "part of a broader strategy to suppress dissent" by the Trump administration.

Of the Trump administration's attempts to deport him, Khalil said in April 2026, "The only thing I am guilty of is speaking out against the genocide in Palestine—and this administration has weaponized the immigration system to punish me for it."

In an interview with The Forward, Khalil said, "the Jewish people are part of the land and they should remain that way" and that he wanted "to liberate everyone". He also said that "a lot of Jewish people subscribe to the idea of Zionism because of the fear of persecution", that he has "a nuanced view of the Zionist project that goes beyond 'Zionism is bad'", and that "there are different layers to that project that unfortunately aren't being seen across the Arab world or among Palestinians."

In an interview with Ezra Klein for The New York Times, responding to Klein's question whether Khalil thought Hamas, with its October 7 attacks, wanted to pull Israel into "some kind of war" or whether the attacks were something that "needed to happen to break the equilibrium", Khalil said he saw it more as the latter: that it was "a desperate attempt to tell the world that Palestinians are here, that Palestinians are part of the equation", driven by the absence of a political process and the imminence of an Israel-Saudi Arabia deal. He added, "they had to do that, according to their calculations—which, it's obvious, were not right." Khalil also opposed the expectation that Palestinians should be "perfect victims after 75 years of dispossession, of killing people in Gaza, being under siege—at that point for over 17 years."

Of the conduct of Columbia University's administration in the early days of the Gaza war, Khalil said, "The narrative that Columbia pushed from the very beginning was a very pro-Israel narrative. By October 8, there were hundreds of Palestinians killed by Israel. Yet Columbia erased that from their communication." Khalil said that Palestinian students' appeals for academic accommodations and acknowledgement of Palestinian suffering were not addressed: "Our ask was very simple: Treat us equally, see us as humans. Yet that was met with opposition or just no answers whatsoever." Of antisemitism at Columbia University, Khalil said: "I wouldn't say there was none. I would say there is this manufactured hysteria about antisemitism at Columbia because of the protests."

== Personal life ==
Khalil is married to Noor Abdalla, a U.S. citizen. The couple has one son who was born while Khalil was incarcerated.
