= Canary Mission =

Israeli doxing website

- Website type: Database of student activists, professors and organizations the site considers to be anti-Israel or antisemitic
- Available in: English
- Headquarters: Beit Shemesh, Israel
- Owner: Megamot Shalom
- Website: canarymission.org
- Commercial: No
- Launched: 2014; 12 years ago
- Current status: Active

Canary Mission is an Israel-based anonymously-run doxing website established in 2014 that publishes the personal information of students, professors, and organizations that it describes as anti-Israel or antisemitic, focusing primarily on people at North American universities.

Canary Mission's published materials have been described as a blacklist and its tactics compared to McCarthyism. Critics have described it as weaponizing the accusation of antisemitism in order to delegitimize or silence opposition to Zionism or criticism of Israel.

Profiles are publicly-available online and intended for wide use, and Canary Mission may actively send them to employers. Known users of the profiles include Israeli intelligence organizations Ministry of Strategic Affairs and Shin Bet, which interrogate and deny entry to American citizens. US Immigration and Customs Enforcement and other US federal agents detained and attempted to deport multiple international students with Canary Mission profiles in March 2025.

== History ==
According to its website, Canary Mission compiles profiles of students, professors, and organizations that "promote hatred of the US, Israel and Jews on North American college campuses". Profiles are constructed using public information such as social media and often contain detailed information. According to The Forward, "The site's profiles appear to be based entirely on open source intelligence that could be gathered by anyone with a computer." Some profiles document prominent white supremacists, including Identity Evropa members and Goyim Defense League (GDL) members. Canary Mission has an "Ex-Canary" process where profiled individuals can request to have their profile removed from the website if they write an apology essay that can be published on the site.

=== 2017–2018 ===
In December 2017, Canary Mission reported on what it alleged were antisemitic tweets posted by students associated with Solidarity for Palestinian Human Rights (SPHR) at McMaster University. The tweets were written between 2011 and 2017 and contained support for Adolf Hitler as well as calls for the death of Israel and Zionists. SPHR, in response, said it "condemns all forms of anti-Semitism within our organization", and that the referenced comments were "intolerable in every sense". The university actively reviewed the "disturbing social media post", but did not publish the results of its review since "it is not our practice to provide details of any actions taken or sanctions applied with regard to individual students".

In February 2018, Twitter briefly suspended Canary Mission's account, for exposing a 2017 tweet by a pro-Palestinian activist that "modified Adele's lyrics to say 'Set Fire to the Jews'". According to Twitter, they made an error in blocking Canary.

In 2018, The Intercept reported that the website was adding students to its lists immediately following their participation in Students for Justice in Palestine activities.

In April 2018, during a Boycott, Divestment and Sanctions (BDS) campaign at George Washington University, flyers with Canary Mission's logo were strewn around the university, along with other flyers denouncing a planned student senate vote. On the day of the vote, two adult men wearing canary costumes performed a dance in the lobby of the building where the vote was taking place. In September 2018, Canary Mission released a report on the vote highlighting antisemitic and anti-Israel tactics used to promote the vote.

In May 2018, Canary Mission released a report on social media posts by Students for Justice in Palestine (SJP) chapter members at Florida State University (FSU), saying that 36% of the social media posts by SJP members were "endorsements or promotion of terror as well as calls for intifada and violence against Jews". The FSU SJP chapter subsequently released a statement writing that they "entirely condemn and denounce the racist, anti-Black, and anti-Semitic statements made by some of the individuals who were previous students and members of our SJP chapter", and commenting that some of the social media posts were "legitimate criticisms of Israeli governmental policies and practices, even though they are presented as anti-Semitic." According to Canary Mission, FSU SJP's response did not condemn social media posts that "called for intifada and violence against Jews".

=== 2019 ===
In January 2019, Lara Kollab, a medical resident at the Cleveland Clinic, was fired over antisemitic social media posts documented by Canary Mission. Kollab's posts included threats to give Jewish people the wrong medication. Kollab also called Jewish people "dogs" and said the Holocaust was "exaggerated." In 2020, the State Medical Board of Ohio permanently barred Kollab from practicing medicine.

=== 2022 ===
In June 2022, Canary Mission published a profile on Ismail Quran, a police officer in Cleveland, Ohio, who allegedly posted antisemitic hate speech to social media. Quran had been honored with a police officer of the year award before coming under investigation when news of his social media posts broke. The mayor of Cleveland Justin M. Bibb and the Cleveland chief of police Wayne Drummond released a statement in August 2022 that said "We are frustrated and disappointed that no charges can be filed against Officer Ismail Quran, despite extensive internal investigations by the Cleveland Division of Police (CDP), the City Prosecutor, and the Law Department."

=== 2024 ===
In February 2024, neo-Nazi Michael Weaver, a member of the Goyim Defense League, lost a libel lawsuit that he filed and was forced to pay the defendant $20,000 in legal fees. The defendant had reportedly written in an online review that a "neo-Nazi" and "member of the KKK" who is a "known felon of hate crimes" was denouncing her business. Weaver's antisemitic views were documented in a Canary Mission profile, and the judge ruled that the defendant's inferences were "reasonable". Weaver lost the case.

In February 2024, Canary Mission published a report showing collaboration between Within Our Lifetime and Decolonize This Place. The report alleged that Nerdeen Kiswani, the founder of WOL, and Amin Husain, the founder of DTP, were responsible for the unrest in New York City following the October 7 attacks in Israel. Examples include a protest outside of the Memorial Sloan Kettering Cancer Center and the Nova Exhibition, a memorial installation detailing the attacks at the Nova Music Festival on October 7, 2023. An attendee at the Nova Protest waved a flag with Hezbollah's logo. The report further alleged that these disruptions followed a premeditated plan that pre-dated the attacks in Israel. The report also included social media posts from Kiswani supporting the October 7, 2023 attacks on Israeli civilians.

In July 2024, the Chicago branch of the Council on American–Islamic Relations (CAIR) attempted to sue Canary Mission on behalf of Kinza Khan. Khan was the subject of a viral video where she was allegedly involved in tearing down posters of Israelis being held captive by Hamas. Canary Mission subsequently profiled Khan. Khan was the plaintiff in two lawsuits against Canary Mission but both suits were dismissed by the judge. CAIR is also representing Laila Ali who was reportedly fired after video surfaced of her tearing down Hamas hostage posters.

Former New York University professor Amin Husain said: "One of the best biographies I have is on Canary Mission. It's endless. The citations are better than I could ever imagine. And everything they cite to is true."

An article by The Intercept from 2024 interviewed a number of professors that were fired or faced disciplinary action from their universities. The article implies that Canary Mission profiles played a role in the disciplinary action, and many of the professors interviewed have profiles on the site.

=== 2025 ===
Various foreign students with Canary Mission profiles have been arrested under the Trump administration in March 2025, including Mahmoud Khalil of Columbia University and Rümeysa Öztürk of Tufts. Öztürk's name and photo were posted to Canary Mission shortly after her only known pro-Palestine activism, co-writing an op-ed in the student newspaper that criticized the administration's handling of student demands such as acknowledgement of Palestinian genocide and divestment from Israel companies. A Canary Mission's profile of Mapheze Saleh may have influenced the arrest of her husband, Georgetown University graduate student Badar Khan Suri. According to a lawyer for Suri, he had no criminal record and was arrested because his father-in-law was documented as a former adviser to a Hamas leader.

In July 2025, testimony by a senior official with ICE's Homeland Security Investigations in federal court confirmed that a Department of Homeland Security team created a target list of anti-Israeli student protestors that was largely based on the Canary Mission lists.

A lawsuit was filed by a group of Israeli citizens in March 2025 in New York against individuals it described as leaders of organizations including Within Our Lifetime, Students for Justice in Palestine at Columbia University, Jewish Voice for Peace at Columbia-Barnard, and Columbia University Apartheid Divest. The suit alleged that the defendants were guilty of "aiding and abetting Hamas' continuing acts of international terrorism." Canary Mission profiles and reports were used as evidence in the lawsuit.

=== 2026 ===
In mid-March 2026, the Council on American–Islamic Relations' Chicago chapter filed a class-action lawsuit on behalf of six plaintiffs against Canary Mission and StopAntisemitism, alleging systematic doxxing and harassment.

In late-April 2026, Drop Site News identified five American individuals who had emigrated to Israel as Megamot Shalom employees who worked as content writers, editors and consultants for Canary Mission, based on data extracted from unlisted websites that Canary Mission had used for its doxxing operations. These individuals were identified through a review of Megamot Shalom's business filings with the Israeli government between 2016 and 2024.

In July 2026, Canary Mission was named along with Betar US and The Heritage Foundation as well as top officials in the Trump administration in a lawsuit filed by Mahmoud Khalil, who negotiated with representatives of Columbia University on behalf of the Gaza Solidarity Encampment and was subsequently detained for 104 days by US Immigration and Customs Enforcement (ICE) as the Trump administration attempted to deport him. The lawsuit, which cites Project Esther and alleges that the private companies conspired with the Trump administration to deny Palestine liberation advocates their constitutional rights, was filed under the Ku Klux Klan Act of 1871.

== Use by government authorities ==
Plainclothes US federal agents apprehend Turkish student Rümeysa Öztürk off the street in Somerville, Massachusetts. The evidence in her case included Canary Mission's profile of her and an op-ed she co-authored for the The Tufts Daily.

In 2023, Haaretz reported that Israeli intelligence organizations, such as the Shin Bet, use Canary Mission profiles. The Ministry of Strategic Affairs used a Canary Mission profile during the attempted deportation proceedings against Lara Alqasem. The Israeli government has been accused of using Canary Mission data at border control. In March 2025, multiple foreign students with Canary Mission profiles were detained by the United States Immigration and Customs Enforcement for allegations of supporting terror. The FBI has targeted activists profiled by Canary Mission.

In July 2025, a senior official from the Department of Homeland Security (DHS) testified in a federal trial that his team used Canary Mission as a source to investigate a number of student protesters that were foreign nationals. Court records from a federal lawsuit revealed that senior Trump administration officials relied heavily on Canary Mission in order to identify foreign students and academics who violated the terms of their visa.

== Employment impact on listed individuals ==
Profiles hosted on Canary Mission may harm the employment opportunities of those listed, particularly students and untenured faculty, by making available their statements to potential employers in a readily available online profile. According to W. J. T. Mitchell, who has a Canary Mission profile, prospective employers see Canary Mission profiles appear at the top of Google search results for students and recent alumni who do not have a "very deep set of achievements". An article from October 2023 referenced a law graduate who had a job offer rescinded and implied that it was because of the applicant's Canary Mission profile.

Some Jewish and pro-Israeli students have said that pro-Palestinian students and faculty have suspected them of colluding with Canary Mission, blaming them even when they were not involved with Canary.

Since 2016, over 41 Cornell activists and organizers have had their personal information posted online by Canary Mission. In the words of Ibtihal Malley, a Barnard alumna who is profiled on Canary Mission, "Some members get put on Canary and decide it isn't worth it in the long run."

== Structure and funding ==
Canary Mission does not publish information about who operates or funds it. According to The Baffler, Canary Mission "receives over 99 percent of its funding from the United States" and its funding is directed from the Central Fund of Israel, which is registered in New York.

In October 2018, The Forward and Haaretz reported that Canary Mission received funding from the Hellen Diller Family Foundation, a supporting foundation of the Jewish Community Federation of San Francisco (JCFSF), and that the website's operations were headed by Jonathan Bash through an Israeli charity named Megamot Shalom. Other journalists have also tied Bash to Canary Mission and Megamot Shalom. Soon after the exposure, JCFSF announced that they would cease funding Canary Mission.

The Forward also identified the Jewish Community Federation of Los Angeles (JCFLA) as a major donor to Megamot Shalom, having donated a sum of $250,000 in 2016–2017. Soon after, JCFLA also announced that they would suspend grants to Megamot Shalom.

In April 2025, The Intercept reported a $100,000 donation to Canary Mission from the Natan and Lidia Peisach Family Foundation, a non-profit backing pro-Israel groups. The foundation's treasurer, Jaime Peisach, is married to University of Pennsylvania trustee Cheryl Peisach.

As of 2015, no organization with the name Canary Mission was registered with the IRS. Canary Mission's donors are anonymous. Multiple pro-Israel organizations have denied having any affiliation with Canary Mission.

According to Edwin Black in The Jerusalem Post, extreme antisemitic comments, as well as outright threats of violence, have been directed towards Canary Mission. Following the threats, Canary Mission became even more cautious and avoided disclosing its physical location or identity. According to Canary Mission's blog, "many of our detractors just want to know who we are so they can physically harm us", which, according to Black, has caused Canary Mission to restrict its communications with journalists. Black, who says he was able to verify Canary Mission's location and operations, says they are a group of students and ex-students working in a medium-sized office in an American city. Conversely, The Baffler wrote that the Canary Mission's staff appear to live in Israel.

Canary Mission's structure and operations have made it difficult to pursue in court.

== Reception ==
Critics including Ray Hanania have accused Canary Mission of weaponizing the accusation of antisemitism in order to silence critique of Israel. The Intercept described Canary Mission as "The most notorious anti-Palestinian campus operation."

Filmmaker Rebecca Pierce, having been profiled as "Radical of the Day" on the Canary Mission site, described Canary Mission as using "'McCarthyist tactics' and employing 'open racism'".

Writers for Le Monde Diplomatique and Jewish academics have compared Canary Mission's practice of demanding apologies from targeted individuals in exchange for amnesty to that of authoritarian regimes and McCarthyism in the United States.

The Forward reported that while some of the profiles include content that is "genuinely troubling", such as antisemitic social media posts, other accusations made by the website are misleading. One such profile accused a student of "demonizing Israel" because the student had made an announcement at a Hillel International–sponsored dinner critical of Donald Trump's decision to move the United States embassy to Jerusalem. According to Israeli attorney Emily Schaeffer Omer-Man, Canary Mission's information is "often neither reliable, nor complete, nor up to date". She said that the site should not be used by Israeli border officials as it does not meet the reliability standards mandated by Israeli law. The site has been criticized for listing both anti-Israel activists and white supremacists, seemingly grouping them together.

Canary Mission has been criticized for targeting Jewish organizations critical of Zionism, such as Jewish Voice for Peace (JVP), IfNotNow, and Mondoweiss. The site profiles Jewish students affiliated with such organizations; listing JVP as having promoted BDS. Canary has justified such profiling by stating JVP "dismisses and enables anti-Semitism." JVP has responded by condemning Canary Mission for "targeted campaigns of misinformation, bigotry and slander."

Pro-Palestinian sources have denounced Canary Mission's activities as an attempt to silence critics of Israel on American college campuses through intimidation. In response, pro-Palestinian activists announced in 2018 plans to launch a website called Against Canary Mission in order to publish profiles of people targeted by Canary Mission and portray their activism in a positive light. Some pro-Israel organizations have also criticized Canary Mission for its aggressive tactics.

Canary Mission has received support from the Algemeiner Journal, Middle East Forum, and Israel on Campus Coalition.

== Reverse Canary Mission ==
In response to Canary Mission's tactics, a website called Reverse Canary Mission was set up during the Gaza war with the stated purpose of identifying "individuals who advocate for the ethnic cleansing and genocide of the Palestinian people".

As of February 2026, the site had published the details of 5,000 people it accused of supporting Israel. That month, it doxxed Melbourne-based Jewish actress Naomi Lisner, accusing her of supporting Israel's "illegal occupation of Palestine" and promoting anti-Palestinian racism after she claimed her union, Media, Entertainment & Arts Alliance (MEAA), was supporting an "international conspiracy to murder Holocaust survivors" in her 2025 screenplay The Imbalance because of MEAA's past support for Palestinians.

The Forward criticized both Canary Mission and Reverse Canary Mission for applying an overbroad definition of antisemitism and anti-Palestinian hatred, respectively.

== See also ==
- Accuracy in Media
- Campus Reform
- Cancel culture
- Professor Watchlist
- Discover the Networks
- Myrotvorets
