= Betar US =

American right-wing Zionist organization

- Founded: 2024; 2 years ago
- Founder: Ronn Torossian
- Location: United States
- Website: betarus.org

Betar US, also known as Betar USA, is a radical right-wing pro-Israel group in the United States. Established in New York in 2024, the organization utilizes the name but is not formally connected to the historic Revisionist Zionist Betar Movement or its American chapter, which had been defunct for years. The group actively supported Israel during the Gaza genocide.

Betar US has been blacklisted by the Anti-Defamation League (ADL) for its embrace of "Islamophobia [and] harras[ing] Muslims."

Following a civil rights investigation launched in March 2025 by New York Attorney General Letitia James, the group entered into a legal settlement in January 2026 over an illegal pattern of bias-motivated harassment, trespassing, and intimidation against Arab, Muslim, Palestinian, and Jewish New Yorkers. The agreement placed the organization under a three-year compliance mandate backed by a $50,000 penalty for violations, alongside an announcement that the group would dissolve its New York organization and cease national operations.

== History ==
=== Founding and leadership ===
Ronn Torossian founded Betar US in 2024. He had previously been active in the Betar movement in the U.S. Ross Glick served as executive director for a period, until a 2019 story resurfaced of his arrest on revenge-porn charges.

According to Haaretz, it is tied to Benjamin Netanyahu's Likud party. The group has supported the neo-fascist Proud Boys, and indicated a desire to work with the extremist group.

=== During the Gaza war ===
After the October 7 attacks, Betar US gained prominence for its approach against pro-Palestinianism and antisemitism online and in real life. It encourages masked “aggressive in-person protests” and vandalism (self-describing itself as vandals), and has protested against mosques and vandalized Palestinian flags.

After the 2024 presidential elections in the United States, its newly elected president, Donald Trump, signed an executive order to deport college students who were on green cards and visas who showed support for Hamas and other organizations on the United States Department of State list of Foreign Terrorist Organizations. This led Betar US to create "Operation Wrath of Zion" which is a doxing campaign to find the personal details of college students who attended pro-Palestine protests and showed what they described as antisemitic and pro-Hamas rhetoric. They called for Jews in the United States and Israelis to report all "pro-Hamas" students to either Betar or the Federal Bureau of Investigation (FBI) so they can get deported. In late January 2025, Betar US submitted a list of students who showed pro-Palestine sentiments to Donald Trump after identifying them in order to get them arrested or deported by Immigration and Customs Enforcement (ICE).

During counter protests at the New York University, Betar US vandalized the university’s Institute for the Study of the Ancient World area with Zionist and anti-Arab slogans. In October 2024, the New York University spokesperson condemned Betar for social media posts calling for violent acts.

In 2025, Betar US started what was dubbed the "Pager Campaign" following Israel’s 2024 Lebanon electronic device attacks, where members put pagers in the pockets of or threatened to give pagers to people they perceived as anti-Israel – targeting prominent personalities like United Nations secretary-general António Guterres, Jewish writer Peter Beinart, and Jewish political scientist Norman Finkelstein. Beinart characterized it as a death threat.

Betar made a threat of a pager attack against Francesca Albanese, the UN Special Rapporteur for the occupied Palestinian territories, when she was going to visit London. In a social media post the group wrote: "Join us to give Francesca a [pager emoji] in London on Tuesday." Nerdeen Kiswani, a Palestinian-American activist, has also been targeted by Betar. The group stated in an X post: "You hate America, you hate Jews, and we are here and won’t be silent. $1,800 to anyone who hands that jihadi a beeper".

In May 2025, the leader of Betar US, Ross Glick, and members of Betar US were investigated for issuing bomb threats against students, organizers, and general protesters on campuses hosting pro-Palestinian. On May 1, 2025, Ronn Torossian was banned by the World Zionist Congress for an ongoing feud with activist Shai Davidai which violated the rule where other delegates are not allowed to talk negatively about other delegates.

In June 2025, there were leaked chats of Betar US members from WhatsApp where chat logs showed members planning counterprotests against pro-Palestinians and organizing crimes against Arabs, Muslims, and pro-Palestinians, which included Quran burnings, mass buying items such as pepper spray, lasers, and other devices.

In August 2025, the World Zionist Congress uplifted the ban against Betar US and their chief Ronn Torossian to run for the WZC slate where he was previously banned for his hateful rhetoric. After this, Betar US chief disavowed the Anti-Defamation League attempting to pursue a resolution calling the ADL "hostile to the Jewish state" due to the fact that the ADL labels Betar US an extremist organization which the chief states is "absurd and dangerous".

On February 26, 2026, Nerdeen Kiswani, founder of Within Our Lifetime, filed a lawsuit against Betar US under the Ku Klux Klan Act accusing the organization of intimidation, threatening, stalking, and depravation of her civil rights, and having a "bounty" on her by the organization.

In July 2026, Mahmoud Khalil filed a lawsuit citing the Ku Klux Klan Act and alleging that Betar US conspired with other pro-Israel groups and top officials in the Trump administration to target campus protesters and deny Palestine liberation advocates their constitutional rights.

== New York civil rights investigation and dissolution ==
In March 2025, Attorney General of New York Letitia James launched an investigation into the group for allegedly violating New York civil rights law and conducting violent harassment based on "explicit hostility" towards protected groups. The investigation found that Betar members trespassed to destroy privately-owned Palestinian flags, threatened opposing protestors with immigration enforcement and beepers, and harassed Jewish professors they viewed as disloyal. It also found that the group publicly and privately celebrated the violence in Gaza as both needed and insufficient and that it was not properly registered with the state Charities Bureau. In January 2026, a settlement required Betar to stop what the AG's office described as "widespread persecution of Muslim, Arab, Palestinian, and Jewish New Yorkers" who disagreed with it on Middle Eastern affairs and file compliance reports for three years, with a $50,000 fine if violated. Although not required by the settlement, the parties announced that it would dissolve its New York organization, which ran its national operations.

The Council on American–Islamic Relations responded to this order by Letitia James positively. The mayor of New York City Zohran Mamdani praised the order by Letitia James causing Betar US to cease operations in New York City. Due to this fact, Betar US called the order by Letitia James dangerous and stated it put "Jews and Zionists at risk". This order has been criticized by some pro-Israeli activists due to the fact that Betar US could be in a place of being singled out and that radical pro-Palestinian organizations should face the same treatment if Betar US is going to be barred from their operations.

== See also ==
- Canary Mission
- Jewish Defense League
