= LaSalle Detention Center =

Immigration detention facility in Louisiana, US

Central Louisiana ICE Processing Center
- Interactive map of Central Louisiana ICE Processing Center
- Location: Jena, Louisiana; 31°42′31″N 92°09′07″W
- Capacity: 1,160
- Opened: 2007
- Former name: LaSalle ICE Processing Center
- Managed by: GEO Group
- Website: www.ice.gov/detain/detention-facilities/central-louisiana-ipc

Central Louisiana ICE Processing Center (known as CLIPC and formerly named LaSalle ICE Processing Center) is an immigration detention facility operated by the GEO Group and located at 830 Pinehill Road, about two miles northwest of downtown Jena, LaSalle Parish, Louisiana.

The Central Louisiana ICE Processing Center has a capacity of 1,160, is constructed on approximately 100 acres, and has a size of 182,890 square feet. CLIPC began intaking immigrant detainees on October 22, 2007. Prior to being awarded their contract under U.S. Immigration and Customs Enforcement in 2007, the facility was a juvenile correction facility.

It is currently most notable for being the detention site of Mahmoud Khalil, a Pro-Palestinian activist who was detained for protesting over the past 17 months before his arrest and detention. Since released.

== History ==
=== Jena Juvenile Correction Facility ===
CLIPC operated as the Jena Juvenile Correction Facility from 1998 to 2001, until a federal investigation found the facility unfit for use and ordered it closed. The federal investigation described that mostly white guards used "cruel and humiliating punishments" and "routinely used excessive force" on the mostly black juvenile inmates.

=== Hurricane Katrina ===
In the wake of Hurricane Katrina, Jena Correctional Facility temporarily reopened to house some 450 inmates evacuated from Jefferson Parish Prison. On October 2, 2005, Human Rights Watch reported that correctional officers allegedly beat and mistreated these inmates.

Inmates at Jena claimed that officers beat, kicked, and hit them while they wore shackles. In some instances, officers ordered inmates to kneel for several hours and hit them if they fell. Officers also forced inmates to hold their faces against walls which they had covered in chemical spray. Inmates allege that, when they became ill and vomited, officers wiped their faces and hair in the vomit.

=== Immigration detention ===
Since 2007, CLIPC has functioned as a detention center for individuals accused of breaking immigration laws. Although the facility's population fluctuates, it often holds a population more than one third the size of Jena (about 3,145 people).

== Abuse and allegations of civil rights violations ==
=== Denial of due process ===
In 2016, the Southern Poverty Law Center found that, alongside Stewart and Etowah County Detention Center, detainees at CLIPC had the lowest rates of representation in the country. In 2015, only six percent of immigrants detained at CLIPC were represented by counsel and only five percent of all asylum applications were granted, compared to 37 and 48 percent nationally. In 2018, SPLC requested a preliminary injunction for CLIPC to increase attorneys' access to their detained clients. SPLC noted that the facility had only one attorney visitation room and required phones calls, which were limited to 20 minutes, to be scheduled a week in advance.

=== Sexual assault ===
In a 2017 report, the Community Initiatives for Visiting Immigrants in Confinement found that CLIPC was among the top five facilities with the most complaints about sexual assaults.

=== Use of pepper spray during COVID-19 presentations ===
On March 25, 2020, CLIPC officials sprayed pepper spray on 79 female detainees who had been attending a presentation by the GEO group on COVID-19 protocols.

== Detainee deaths ==
=== Deaths in 2016 ===
In the first half of 2016, three detainees at LaSalle Detention Facility died in custody. The detainees' ages ranged from 36 to 65 and died from heart ailments and, in one instance, liver failure after admission for possible sepsis. Another detainee who failed to receive medical care reportedly died from cancer only months after being released.

=== Roger Rayson ===
On March 13, 2017, Roger Rayson, a 47-year-old Jamaican national, died in Lafayette General Hospital after being transferred out of CLIPC on February 11. Rayson was the first person to die in immigration detention during the Trump administration.

Rayson was HIV-positive when he arrived at CLIPC and, according to internal ICE documents, had been diagnosed with Burkitt's lymphoma. Rayson never received chemotherapy during his time at CLIPC, and was placed in solitary confinement for nine days before being transferred to a hospital. Outside doctors who reviewed the records say his treatment was badly mismanaged, and that the government's failure to treat his cancer directly caused his death.

=== Ernesto Rocha-Cuadra ===
On June 23, 2023, Ernesto Rocha-Cuadra, a 42-year-old Nicaraguan national, was found unresponsive in CLIPC and taken to a local hospital. Rocha-Cuadra died that afternoon, but ICE officers did not inform his family until June 28.

Rocha-Cuadra was detained by ICE between April 17, 2022 and June 23, 2023. CLIPC officials ignored a recommendation for his release by an ICE panel in November 2022. The American Civil Liberties Union alleges that CLIPC officials subjected Rocha-Cuadra to medical neglect, physical abuse, and solitary confinement after he assisted fellow detainees with their immigration cases. Rocha-Cuadra's brother claims to have listened in on a phone call where an official beat and choked Rocha-Cuadra after he asked for pain medication. In the months leading to his death, Rocha-Cuadra submitted at least 29 grievances alleging that he was refused medical care, denied access to his personal detention records and was subject to mistreatment and negligence by guards.

ICE's "Detainee Death Report" attributes Rocha-Cuadra's passing to cardiac arrest. Rocha-Cuadra's family claims he did not have a history of health issues and that it "looked like there was a struggle, like he was beaten," when they viewed his body. During their last video call, Rocha-Cuadra was wearing a large cast and would not tell them what had happened. The government has refused to release video footage of the solitary confinement unit at CLIPC to Rocha-Cuadra's family and attorneys.
