= Temple Beth Sholom (Marquette, Michigan) =

Reform synagogue in Marquette, Michigan, United States

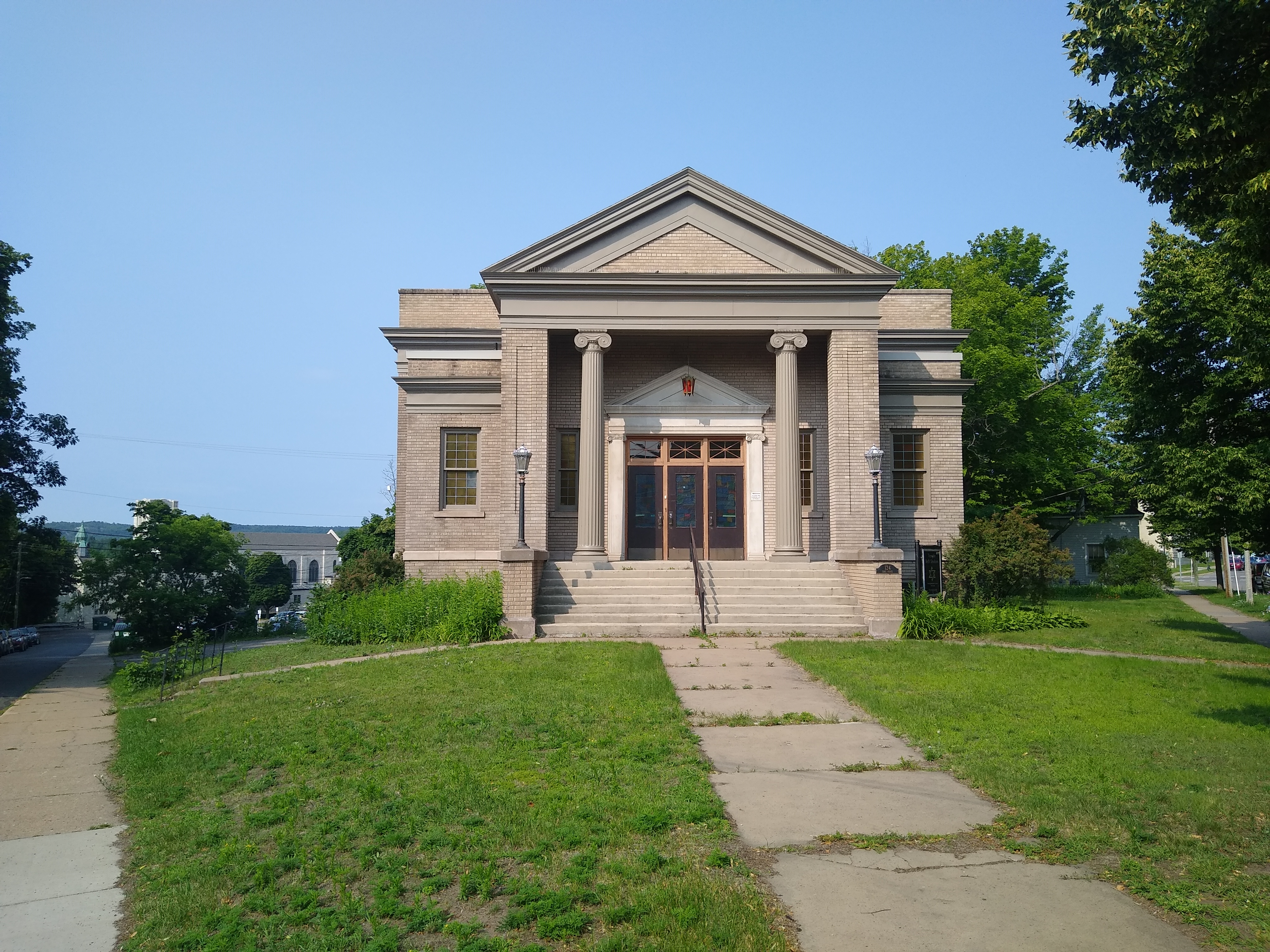

- Location in Michigan

Religion
- Affiliation: Reform Judaism
- Status: Active

Location
- Location: 233 Blaker Street, Marquette, Michigan
- Country: United States
- Interactive map of Temple Beth Sholom
- Coordinates: 46°32′42″N 87°23′28″W

Architecture
- Style: Neoclassical; Greek Revival
- Established: 1953 (as a congregation)
- Completed: 2017 (as a synagogue)
- Materials: Brick; limestone

Website
- tbsmqt.org
- First Church of Christ, Scientist
- U.S. Historic district – Contributing property
- Part of: Arch and Ridge Streets Historic District (ID80001879)
- Designated CP: June 18, 1980

Temple Beth Sholom is a Reform Jewish synagogue located at 233 Blaker Street, in Marquette, Marquette County, Michigan, in the United States. Founded in 1953 in Ishpeming, Temple Beth Sholom is the successor to multiple smaller congregations present in the Marquette area since the early 20th century. Temple Beth Sholom is one of two Jewish congregations in the Upper Peninsula, the other being Temple Jacob in Hancock.

Temple Beth Sholom has been located in the historic First Church of Christ, Scientist building in downtown Marquette since 2017. The church building, built in 1925, is a contributing property to the Arch and Ridge Streets Historic District.

== Predecessors ==
The first Jewish resident of Michigan, Ezekiel Solomon, arrived at Michilimackinac from Montreal in 1761. A century passed before Marquette had its first Jewish resident, with the arrival of merchant Samuel Kaufman in the 1860s.

Marquette and Negaunee both had organized congregations by 1907. A cemetery had been established, and together there was a Jewish community of over 30 residents. By 1912, the population of the Marquette and Ishpeming Jewish communities numbered about 75, and a Jewish Ladies' Aid Society had been founded. Rabbinical leadership arrived as early as 1920, with services in Negaunee led by an itinerant Orthodox rabbi from Chicago.

The Congregation of Israel in Hancock, predecessor to Temple Jacob, was founded in 1912. With the closure of Anshe Knesseth Israel in Iron Mountain in 2020, Temple Jacob and Beth Sholom are the only two remaining congregations in the Upper Peninsula.

== Congregation ==
The Cohodas family of Ishpeming founded a religious school in their home in the 1940s, representing the continued growth of the local Jewish community. Interest grew in a permanent home for the Jewish community in the area over the next decade, culminating in the establishment of the Beth Shalom Community Center, Inc. The initial membership was over 150, including members from as far away as Munising. The organization quickly purchased a plot of land in Ishpeming from the Cliffs company, adjacent to Al Quaal Recreation Area.

The new home of the Temple Beth Shalom, at 2100 Prairie Avenue, was formally dedicated in June 1953. The dedication was an interfaith event, led by Rabbi Richard C. Hertz of Detroit's Temple Beth El, and attended by clergy from across Marquette County. The Lowenstein and Fine families donated their family Torah scrolls, both of which were brought with the families to Michigan over 50 years earlier. The new congregation set out to find rabbinic leadership in the summer of 1953, and established a partnership with the Hebrew Union College – Jewish Institute of Religion (HUC–JIR) in Cincinnati.

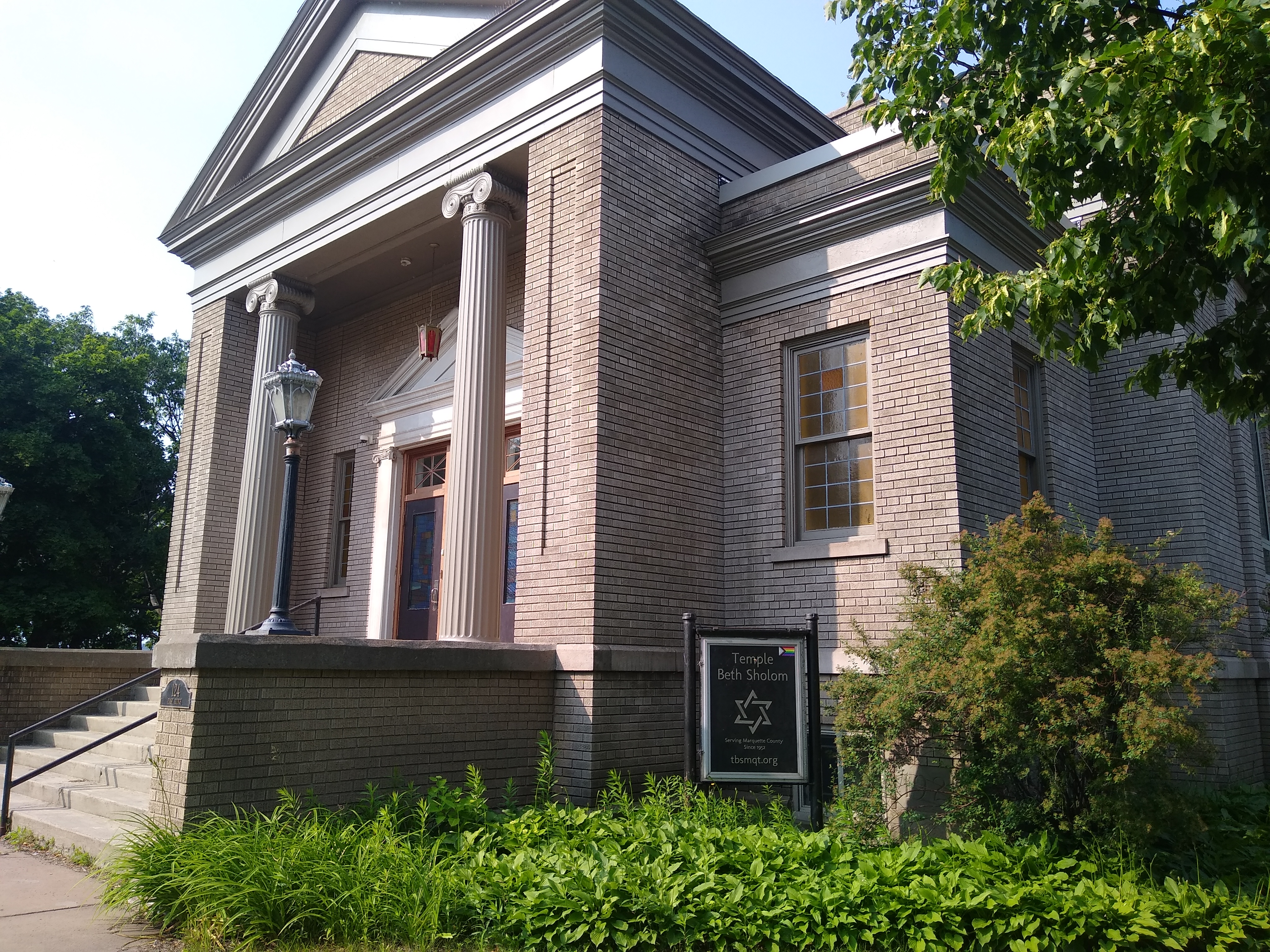
Detail view of Temple Beth Sholom's front entrance

The first High Holy Days services were held in September 1953, led by Rabbi Abraham Cronbach, who had controversially advocated for clemency for Julius and Ethel Rosenberg only months earlier. Rabbi Cronbach was referred to the congregation by the HUC–JIR, the beginning of a decades-long partnership. Services at Temple Beth Sholom are still led by rabbinical students from the Cincinnati campus of the HUC–JIR.

The congregation commissioned a series of stained-glass windows in 1962, followed by a second series in the early 1970s. The windows are some of the final designs by A. Raymond Katz, whose works in stained glass are seen in synagogues across the United States. The first series shows a symbolic interpretation of the Ten Commandments, and the second series depicts Yom Kippur and Shabbat.

== Building history ==
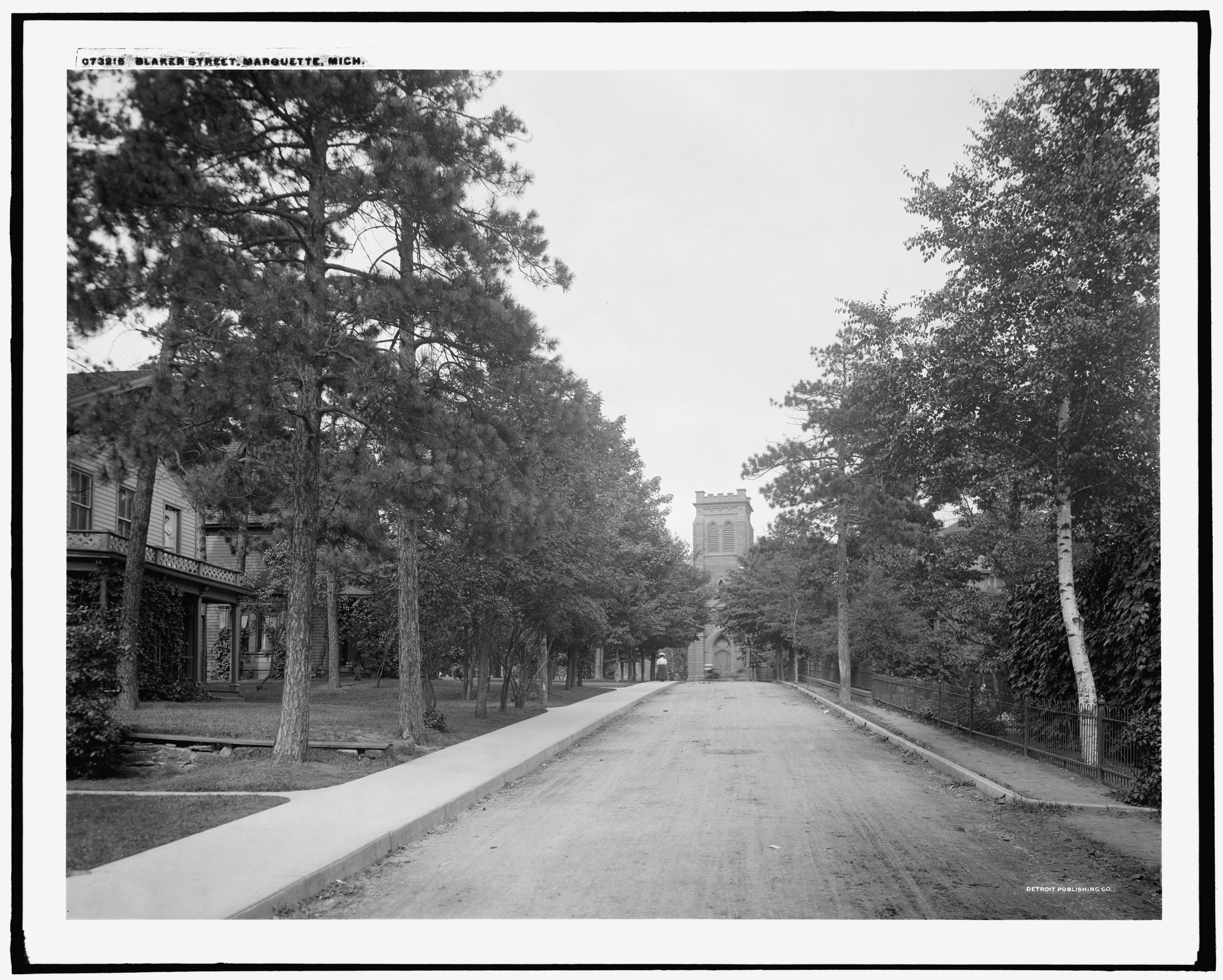
Blaker Street in 1910. The future site of the Christian Science Church is to the left, and visible at center is St. Paul's Episcopal Church

The new Temple Beth Sholom building was constructed in 1925 as the First Church of Christ, Scientist. The history of Christian Science in Marquette is intertwined with the lives of Mary Beecher Longyear and John Munro Longyear, prominent residents of Marquette in the late 19th and early 20th centuries.

The Longyears became active in Christian Science in the 1890s, and their involvement resulted in the formation of a Christian Science congregation in Marquette. The Longyears left Marquette in 1903 for Brookline, Massachusetts, but the congregation that they helped form continued. The Christian Science congregation began planning for a grand church building in 1912, but with the outbreak of World War I, the congregation faced financial challenges. Plans were scaled down, and construction of the smaller but still impressive building concluded in 1925. The church building is variously described as Neoclassical or Greek Revival style, built of gray brick with limestone accents.

The church building was listed as a contributing property in the Arch and Ridge Streets Historic District in 1978.

Marquette's Christian Science congregation faced declining membership, and sold the building in 2004. The building was renamed the Marquette Citadel, and the former sanctuary on the upper floor was converted to a ballroom. The Citadel was later renovated to include private residences on both levels.

== Move to Marquette ==
Temple Beth Sholom purchased the Citadel building in late 2016, after a 10-year search. Renovations began soon afterwards, creating a sanctuary and a library on the upper level of the building. The lower level includes a social hall and an apartment for visiting rabbis. The newly renovated building is fully accessible, with ramps and lifts for level access throughout the building.

The final service in Ishpeming was held in May 2017, and the new Marquette home of Temple Beth Sholom was dedicated in May 2018. The stained-glass windows and pews were moved from Ishpeming, along with the congregation's historic Torah scrolls. A new mezuzah for the entrance of the synagogue was created by Holocaust survivor Martin Lowenberg for the occasion.

Relocating to Marquette allows the congregation to better serve its members, many of whom are affiliated with Northern Michigan University and UP Health System - Marquette. The new building's location is in close proximity to multiple houses of worship in Marquette, supporting Temple Beth Sholom's mission of interfaith dialogue.

== See also ==
- National Register of Historic Places listings in Marquette County, Michigan
