= Call House =

Historic house in Michigan, United States

- U.S. National Register of Historic Places
- U.S. Historic district – Contributing property
- Michigan State Historic Site
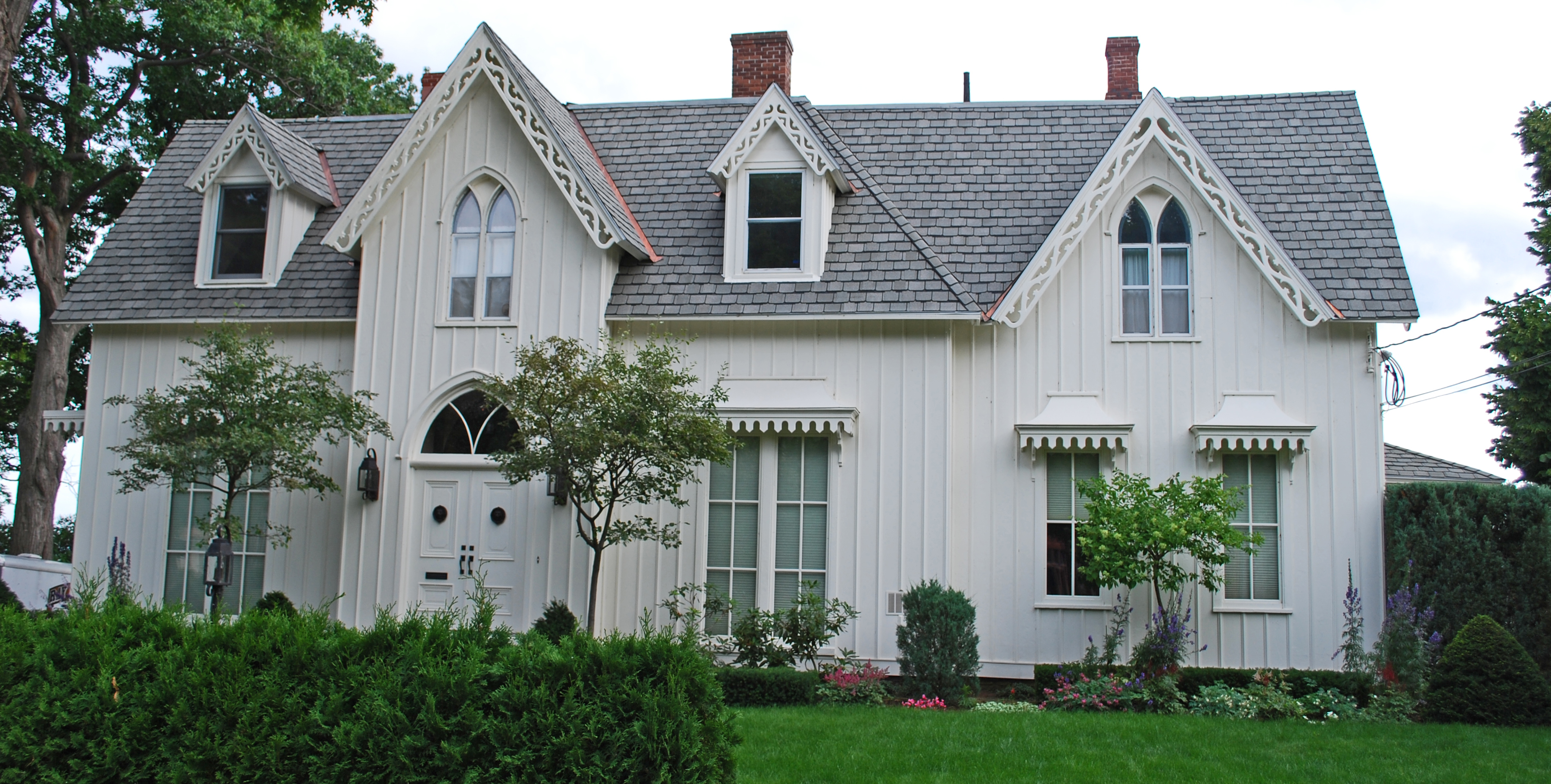
- Interactive map
- Location: 450 E. Ridge St., Marquette, Michigan
- Coordinates: 46°32′44″N 87°23′4″W
- Built: 1875
- Architect: Carl F. Struck
- Architectural style: Gothic Revival
- Part of: Arch and Ridge Streets Historic District (ID80001879)
- NRHP reference No.: 72000641

Significant dates
- Added to NRHP: January 13, 1972
- Designated CP: June 18, 1980
- Designated MSHS: May 18, 1971

The Call House is a private residence located at 450 East Ridge Street in the Arch and Ridge Streets Historic District in Marquette, Michigan. The house is also known as the Henry R. and Mary Hewitt Mather House. It was designated a Michigan State Historic Site in 1971 and listed on the National Register of Historic Places in 1972.

== History ==
The Call House was designed and built in 1867 by Carl F. Struck for Henry R. Mather. Mather was the first president of the Cleveland Iron Mining Company. The house was later used by U.S. Supreme Court Justice George Shiras Jr. as a summer home, and was used by Charles H. Call, president of the First National Bank and Marquette County Savings Bank.

== Description ==
The house is a particularly noteworthy example of Gothic Revival architecture. It is a 1 1/2-story structure, built of wood with steeply pitched gables and dormers, vertical board-and-batten siding, and arched windows. The first floor boasts tall, six-pane windows.
