= 2019 synagogue vandalism =

Antisemitic incidents in the U.S.

On September 19, 2019, members of neo-Nazi accelerationist paramilitary group The Base vandalized Beth Israel Sinai Congregation in Racine, Wisconsin, and Temple Jacob in Hancock, Michigan in the US, in a campaign the group dubbed "Operation Kristallnacht". Three members of The Base were arrested and subsequently found guilty.

== Background ==
The Base is a neo-Nazi accelerationist paramilitary group that advocates attacking African Americans and Jewish people to support the creation of a white ethnostate in the United States.

== Attacks ==
Between September 15 and September 23, 2019, members of The Base plotted to vandalize synagogues in Racine, Wisconsin, and Hancock, Michigan, as part of a campaign the group called "Operation Kristallnacht" after the Kristallnacht pogrom perpetrated by the Nazis in November 1938. The operation was coordinated and directed by 19-year-old Richard Tobin of Brooklawn, New Jersey.

Operation Kristallnacht was conducted on September 21. That evening, 22-year-old Yousef Omar Barasneh of Oak Creek, Wisconsin spray-painted swastikas, antisemitic words such as Jude, and The Base's symbol on the outside of the Beth Israel Sinai Congregation in Racine. Barasneh also plotted additional acts of vandalism. However, these plans were compromised after one of the group's ringleaders became an FBI informant.

In Hancock, Michigan, 23-year-old Nathan Weeden of Houghton, Michigan, spraypainted swastikas and The Base's symbol on the exterior of Temple Jacob.

== Aftermath ==
On January 17, 2020, Barasneh was arrested by the US Federal Bureau of Investigation (FBI) and charged with conspiring to violate citizens’ rights to use property free from threats and intimidation by the Eastern District of Wisconsin. On August 13, 2020, Barasneh pleaded guilty to a federal civil rights charge for vandalism at Beth Israel Sinai and for his involvement in Operation Kristallnacht.

On February 26, 2021, Tobin pleaded guilty to one count of conspiracy against rights in federal court. Tobin told FBI agents that he was "triggered by the state of the country". He remained on house arrest until his sentencing. On November 16, 2021, Tobin was sentenced to 1 year and a day in federal prison and 3 years of supervised release for his involvement in Operation Kristallnacht.

On June 30, 2023, Weeden was arrested by the FBI and charged with conspiracy against rights and damage to religious property by the Western District of Michigan. On January 25, 2024, a jury convicted Weeden of two counts, conspiring against rights and damaging religious property, for his role in the vandalism at Temple Jacob and for his involvement in Operational Kristallnacht. On June 5, 2024, Weeden was sentenced to 26 months in prison and 3 months of supervised release for the incident.

Barasneh's arrest came amidst a nationwide campaign of U.S. law enforcement actions against The Base. On January 16, the day before Barasneh's arrest, federal authorities arrested three members of The Base in Delaware and Maryland on firearms and immigration-related offenses. The individuals were planned to attend the 2020 VCDL Lobby Day. On January 17, 2020, three members of The Base were arrested in Georgia for allegedly planning to murder people in Antifa.

== See also ==
- List of antisemitic incidents in the United States
