= Arch and Ridge Streets Historic District =

Historic district in Michigan, United States

- U.S. National Register of Historic Places
- U.S. Historic district
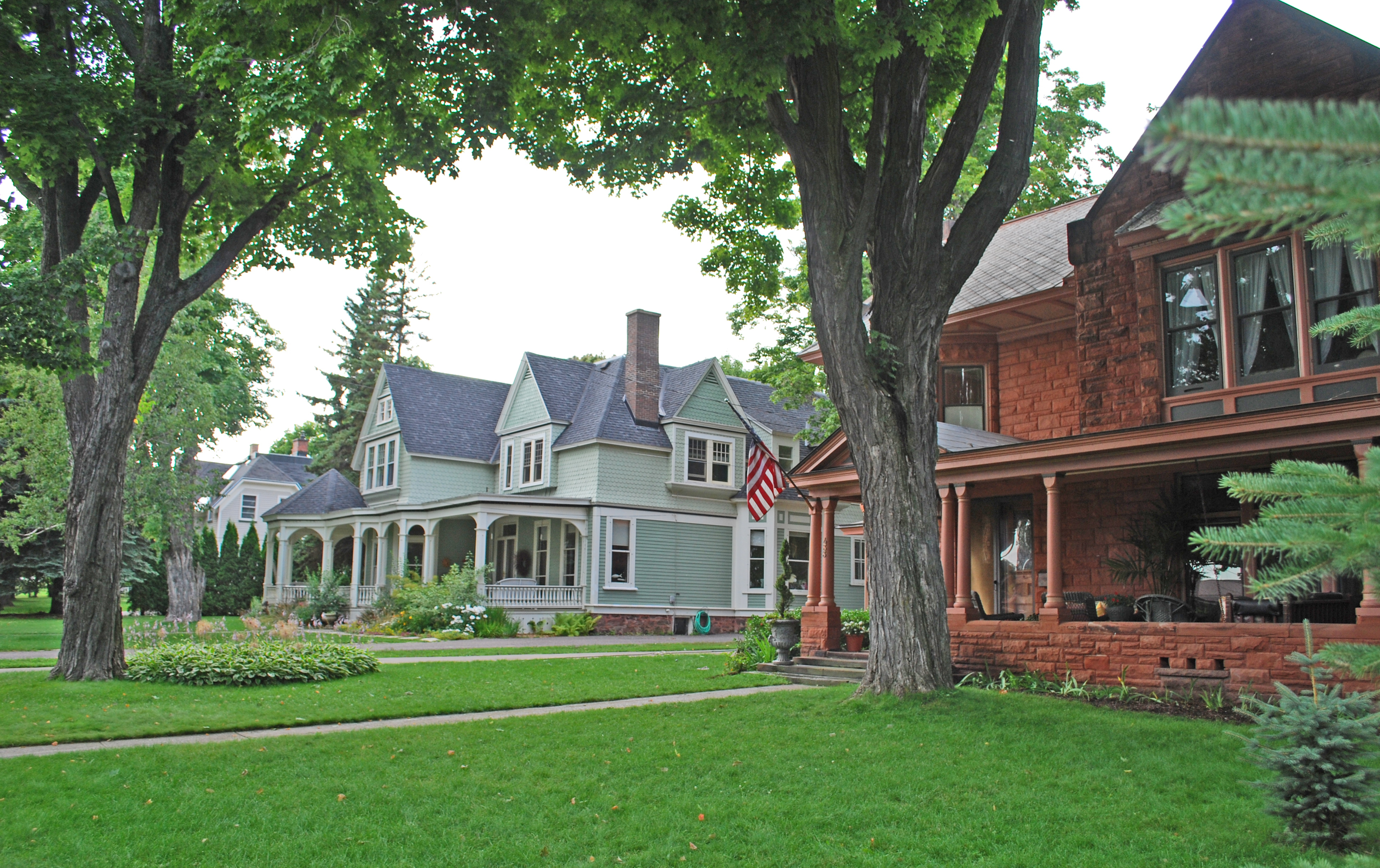
- Street scene on Ridge Street
- Interactive map
- Location: Arch and Ridge streets. from Front Street. to Lake Superior, Marquette, Michigan
- Coordinates: 46°32′43″N 87°23′6″W
- Built: 1870
- Architect: Multiple
- Architectural style: Gothic, Italianate, Romanesque
- NRHP reference No.: 80001879
- Added to NRHP: June 18, 1980

The Arch and Ridge Streets Historic District is a historic district located in Marquette, Michigan, United States, running along Arch and Ridge Streets from Front Street to Lake Superior. It was listed on the National Register of Historic Places in 1980. The district includes the Call House.

== Description ==
The residential core of the district is defined by a ridge running east-and-west (known locally as simply "the Ridge"), which gives Ridge Street its name. The district includes spectacular residences built for some of the leading citizens of Marquette, as well as more modest houses for white- and blue-collar workers. Two public structures, the Peter White Library and First United Methodist Church, are also located within the district.

Seven of these structures are built from local sandstone. These include the Daniel Merritt House and St. Paul's Episcopal Cathedral. A small cottage in the neighborhood was the inspiration for Carroll Watson Rankin's 1904 novel, The Dandelion Cottage.

== History ==
The first construction in the Arch and Ridge Streets Historic District was in 1867, when Peter White built the first house on the Ridge. Most of the construction in the district took place over the next 35 years as other leading citizens of Marquette followed White's lead, including pioneer businessman and industrialist Hiram A. Burt, Charles H. Call, Daniel Merritt, Andrew Ripka, David Murray, Josiah Reynolds, Frank Bennett Spear, and James Jopling.

== Gallery ==
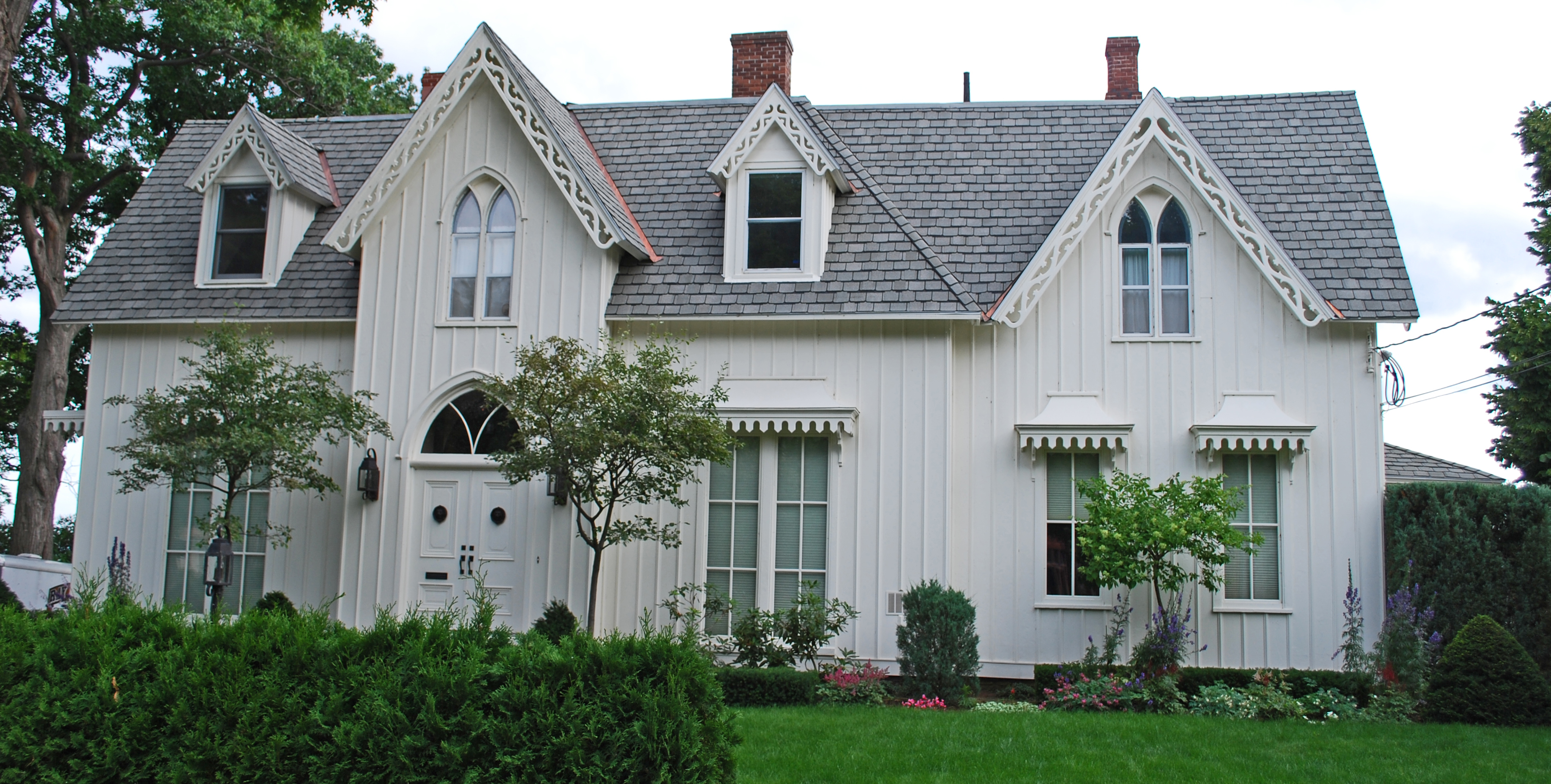
Call House at 450 E. Ridge Street

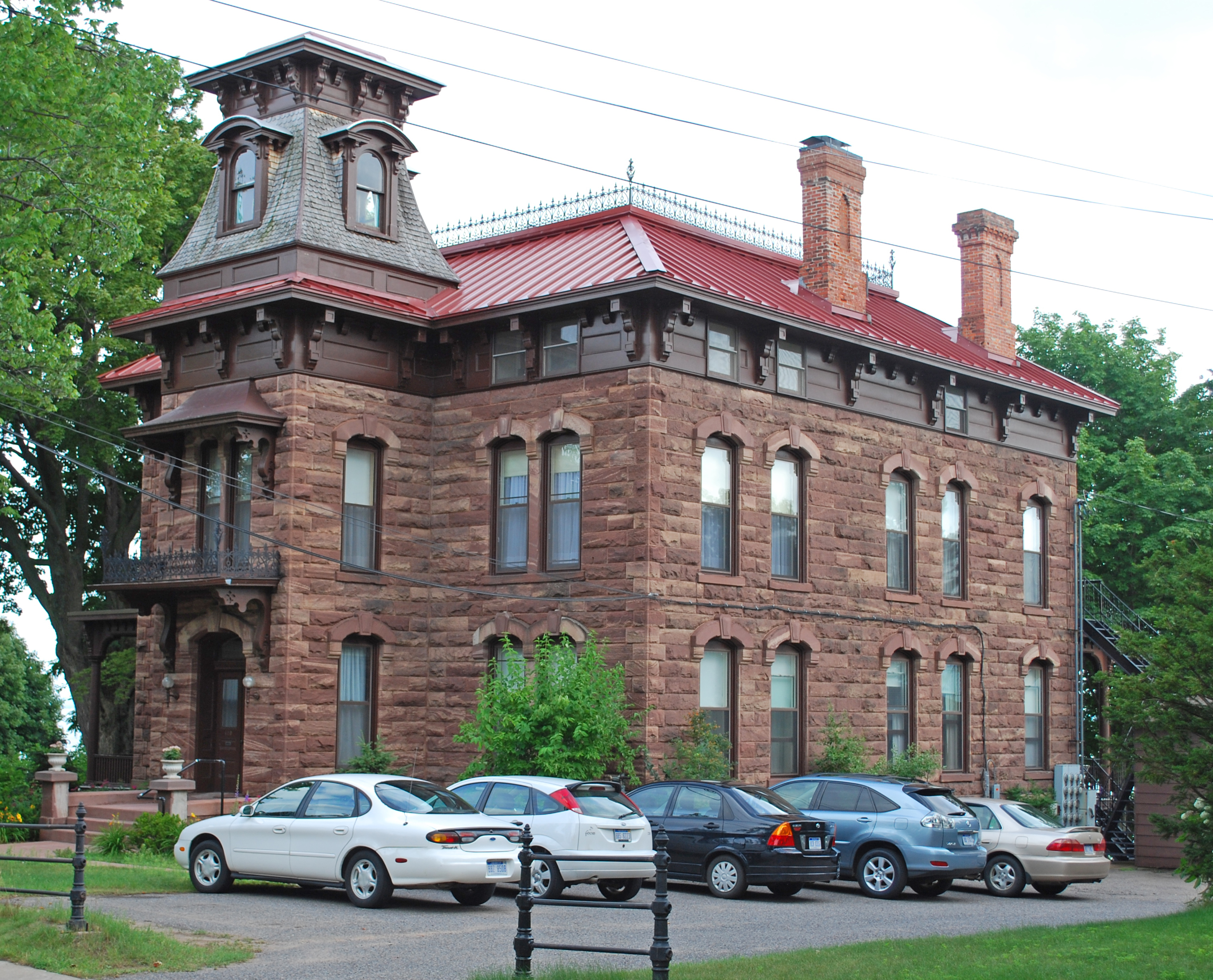
Daniel Merritt House at 410 E. Ridge Street

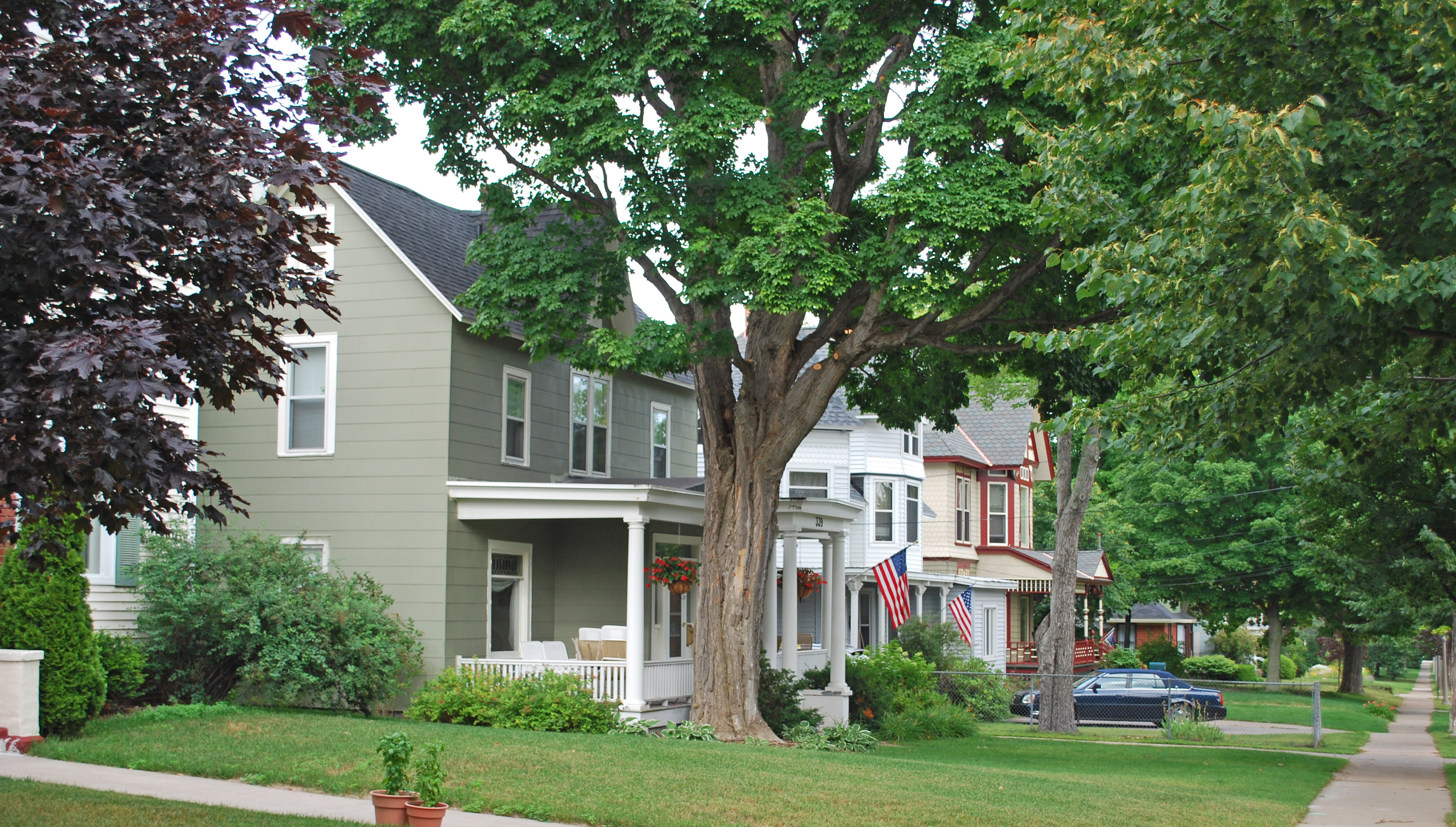
Street scene on Arch Street

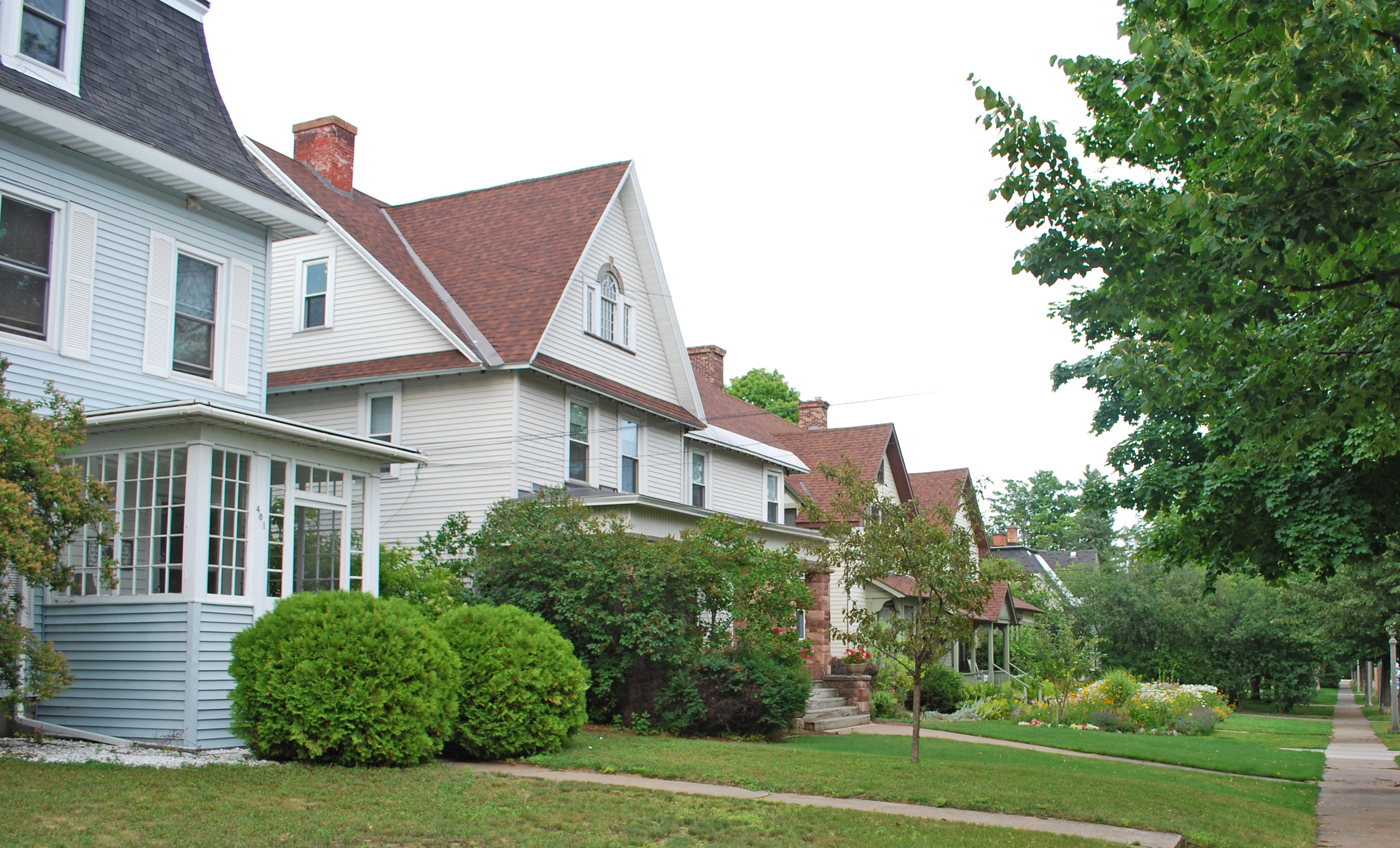
Street scene on Arch Street

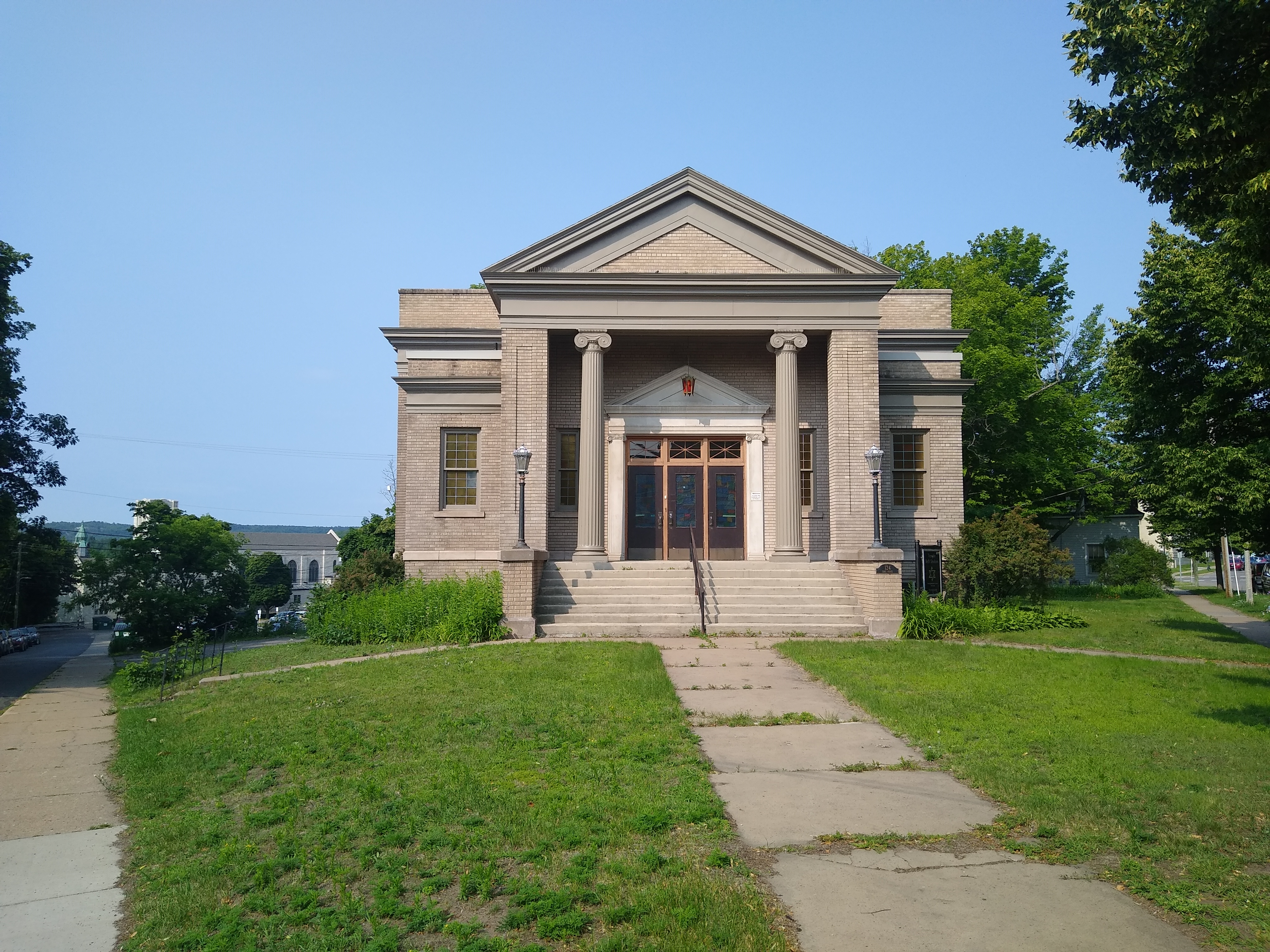
Temple Beth Sholom

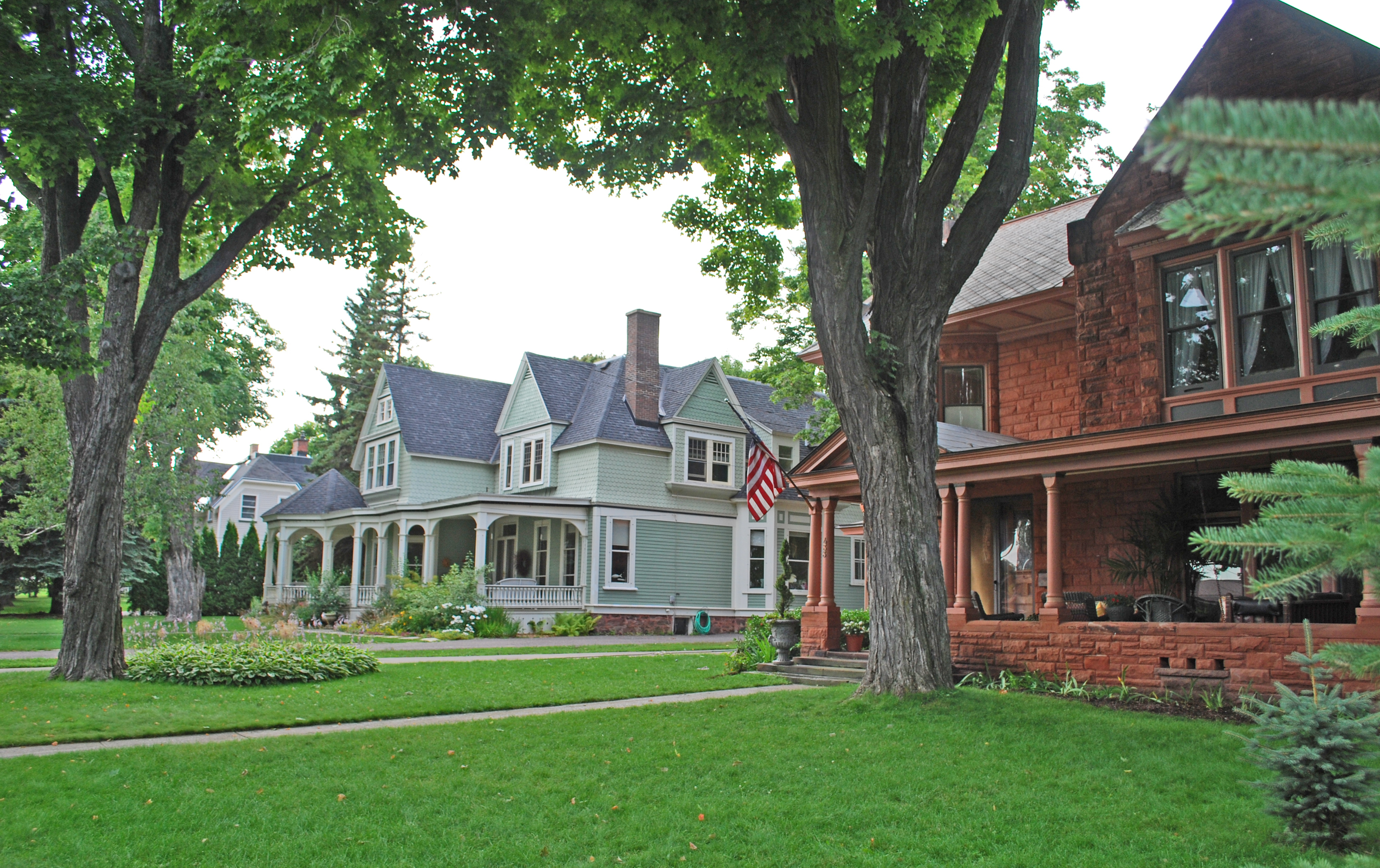
Waterworks at Lake Superior
