= Temple Jacob =

Synagogue in Michigan, U.S.

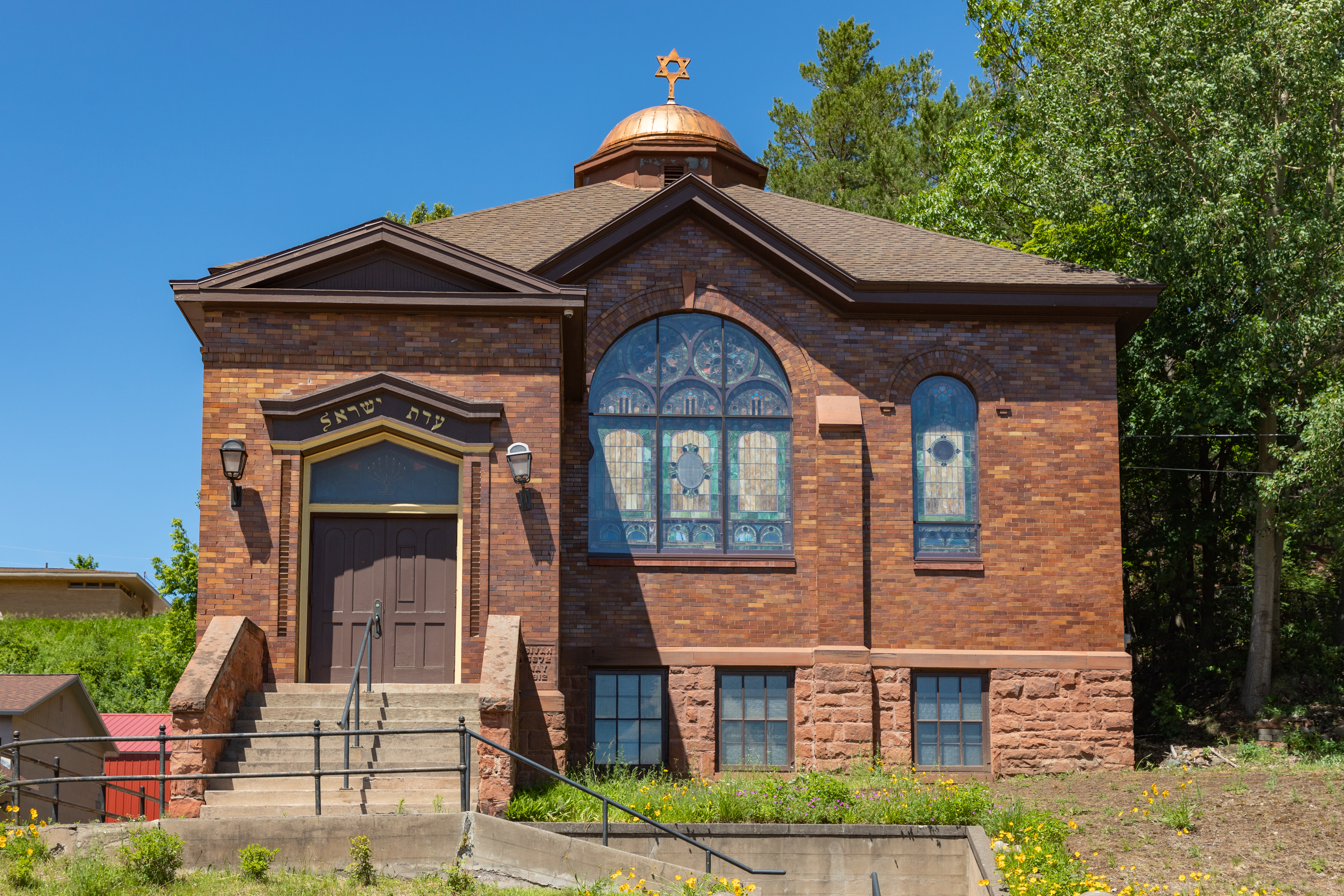
- Temple Jacob, in 2021

- Location in Michigan

Religion
- Affiliation: Reform Judaism
- Ecclesiastical or organizational status: Synagogue
- Status: Active (seasonal)

Location
- Location: 301 Front Street, Hancock, Michigan 49930
- Country: United States
- Interactive map of Temple Jacob
- Coordinates: 47°07′34″N 88°34′25″W

Architecture
- Architect: Maass Brothers
- Type: Synagogue architecture
- Style: Georgian Revival
- Established: 1889 (as a congregation)
- Completed: 1912
- Materials: Jacobsville sandstone

Temple Jacob, officially the Congregation of Israel, is an historic Reform Jewish congregation and synagogue, located at 301 Front Street, in Hancock, in the Upper Peninsula region of Michigan, in the United States.

The congregation originated out of the copper boom in the Keweenaw Peninsula in the late 19th and early 20th century. The first Jewish synagogue in the Copper Country, it is also the oldest, continuously active Jewish house of worship in the Upper Peninsula and the only active synagogue in Michigan listed on the National Historic Register as a contributing property in the East Hancock Neighborhood Historic District.

The synagogue is located near the north end of the lift bridge which connects the two towns of Houghton and Hancock. It was built on land purchased from the Quincy Mining Company and was dedicated in September 1912. The cornerstone inscribes the building in memory of Jacob, son of Israel Gartner, who was a generous contributor and fundraiser. He died shortly before the building was completed.

== Builders and structure ==
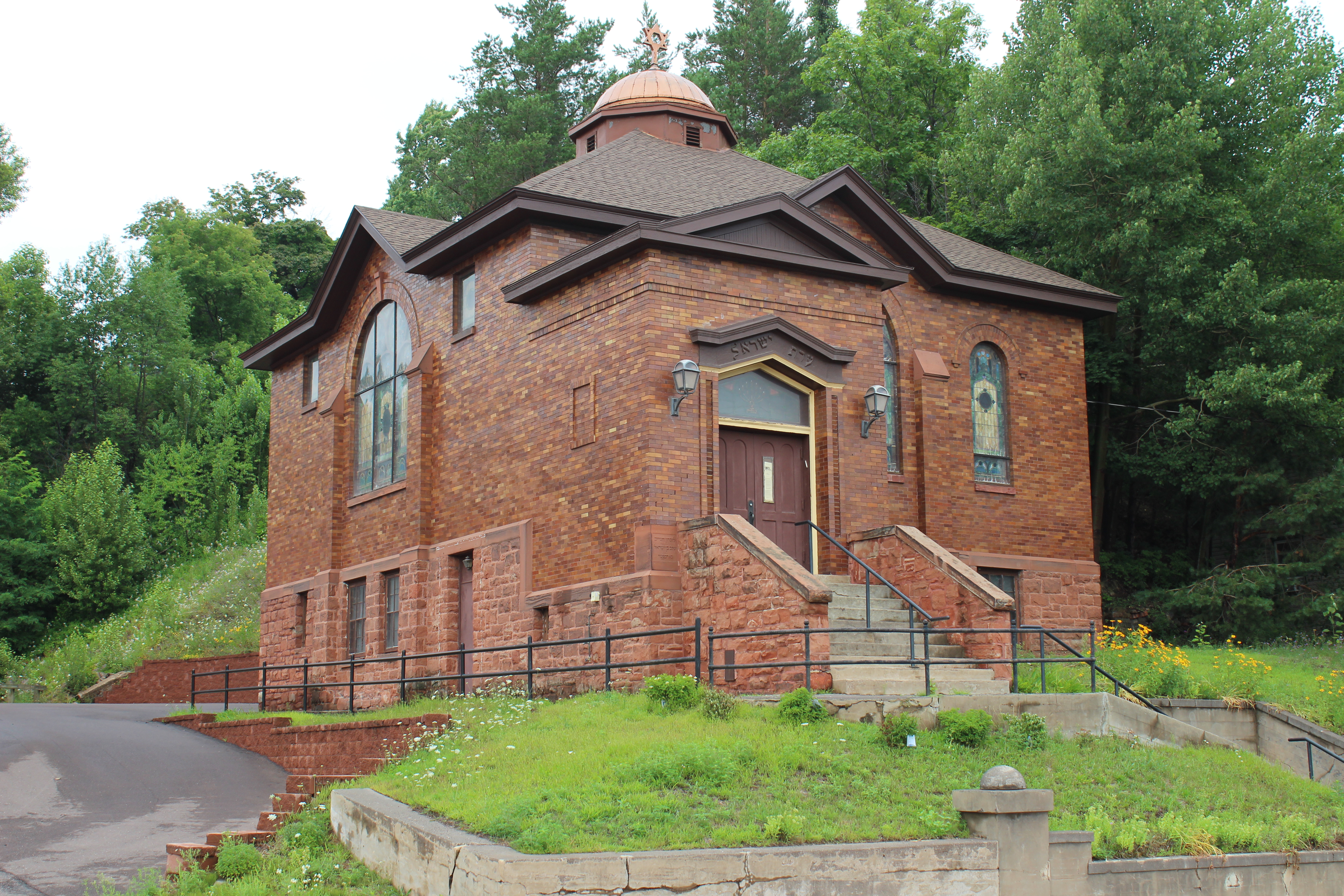
Southwest corner of the building

Maass Brothers Architects provided the plans and specifications. J. J. Kelly built the temple foundation, which is constructed of Jacobsville sandstone. A. J. Verville completed the superstructure. A vitrified glazed brick was used for the walls.

The hip-roofed structure, which measures 40 by 40 feet (12 m × 12 m) is topped by a copper dome. "Windows are round-arched, with stained glass that depicts a dove with an olive branch, shofar (ram's horn), burning bush, Noah's ark, hands in blessing, Star of David, eternal light, and the tablets of the Ten Commandments. Inside, the layout of the temple follows normal Jewish customs, with the ark on the east wall. A balcony was once used to separate the men and the women during prayers."

== History ==
The Congregation of Israel was established in 1889, at a time when the Jewish population in the Copper Country was increasing steadily in size. By 1910, at the peak of the copper boom, there were about 100 Jewish families in the Copper Country. By the time the synagogue was completed in 1912, the demand for copper had started to decline; and, with it, the population of the area, including the Jewish population.

Although initially formed as an Orthodox congregation, Temple Jacob eventually changed to become a Reform synagogue, as did many other small synagogues throughout the U.S. In the 1930s a local businessman and retailer, Norbert Kahn, who had come to the Upper Peninsula from Germany in the mid-1920s and married into the Gartner family, brought a number of his relatives from Germany to escape the hopeless situation of pre-World War II Germany.

=== Vandalism ===
On September 21, 2019, 23-year-old Nathan Weeden of Houghton, Michigan, spray painted swastikas and the symbol of The Base, a neo-Nazi group, on the exterior of Temple Jacob as part of a broader vandalism campaign the group called Operational Kristallnacht. In January 2024, Weeden was convicted of conspiring to injure, oppress, threaten or intimidate any person in the exercise of their rights and convicted of intentionally defacing, damaging or destroying religious property. His co-conspirators had previously pleaded guilty to federal crimes related to the incident.

On June 4, 2024, the US Attorney's Office for Western Michigan announced Mr. Weeden "was sentenced to 26 months for conspiring with other members of a white supremacist group, The Base, to victimize Black and Jewish people, and for defacing Temple Jacob.."

== Recent history ==
Although the Jewish population, like the local population in general, continued to decline through most of the 20th century, new families continued to arrive in small numbers. In recent years an active but small congregation of professionals, academics at Michigan Technological University, recent arrivals of summer visitors, a small continuing local Jewish population, and a group of generous friends have helped to maintain the synagogue and keep Judaism alive in the Copper Country through High Holiday services which are conducted by a visiting rabbi, Passover Seders, Torah study, Sukkot and Tu BiShvat celebrations and Jewish summer camp scholarships.

Temple Jacob is one of two Jewish congregations in the Upper Peninsula, following the closure of Anshe Knesseth Israel in Iron Mountain in 2020. The other is Temple Beth Sholom of Marquette, formerly in Ishpeming.
